= Deathwish Inc. discography =

- Studio albums: 140
- Extended plays: 53
- Live albums: 1
- Compilation albums: 11
- Singles: 22
- Video albums: 3
- Split EPs: 17

The following is a list of releases by independent record label Deathwish Inc. The label was founded by Jacob Bannon of Converge and Tre McCarthy in 2000 and began releasing albums in 2001. This list does not include releases by the sub-labels Icarus, Secret Voice or Malfunction Records, or Deathwish's sampler album series.

== Main discography ==
Catalog^{[note A]}	Artist(s)	Album	Type	Release date
DW001	Converge / Hellchild	Deeper the Wound	split EP	2001-04-23
DW002	Boysetsfire	"Suckerpunch Training"	single	2001-11-20
DW003	Various artists	Fighting Music 01	compilation	
DW004	The Dedication	Youth Murder Anthems	EP	2001-11-20
DW005	Damage	Final	studio album	2001-11-20
DW005.5	Jesuseater	Jesuseater	EP	2002-02-19
DW006	Reach the Sky	Open Roads and Broken Dreams	EP	2002
DW006.5	Hellchild	Bareskin	studio album	2001
DW007	The Promise	"My True Love"	single	2002-04-30
DW008	A Life Once Lost	The Fourth Plague: Flies (7" only; CD on Robotic Empire)	EP	
DW009	Knives Out	Heartburn	EP	2002-04-30
DW010	Jesuseater	Step Inside My Deathray	studio album	2002-09-17
DW011	Some Girls	The Rains	EP	
DW012	Horror Show	Our Design	EP	2002-09-17
DW013	The Hope Conspiracy / The Suicide File	Dead Man's Hand 01	split EP	
DW014	The Blinding Light	Glass Bullet	EP	2002-09-17
DW015	Converge	Unloved and Weeded Out	compilation	2003-01-28
DW016	I Hate You	Discography 1995 / 1998	compilation	2002-05-28
DW017	Converge	The Long Road Home	video album	2003-02-25
DW018	Ringworm	The Promise (reissue; originally on Indecision)	studio album	2003
DW019	Various artists	Fighting Music 02	compilation	2002-09-17
DW020	Cursed	I	studio album	2003-02-25
DW021	Most Precious Blood	Our Lady of Annihilation (LP only; CD on Trustkill)	studio album	
DW022	Embrace Today	Soldiers	studio album	2003-03-25
DW023	A Life Once Lost	A Great Artist	studio album	2003-06-17
DW024	The Promise	Believer (LP only; CD on Indecision)	studio album	
DW025	Integrity	To Die For	studio album	2003-09-23
DW026	Breather Resist	Only in the Morning	EP	2003-03-25
DW027	The Blinding Light	The Ascension Attempt	studio album	2003-10-14
DW028	Some Girls	The Blues	EP	
DW029	Some Girls	All My Friends Are Going Death	compilation	2003-10-14
DW030	Horror Show	The Holiday	EP	2004
DW031	Ringworm / Terror	Dead Man's Hand 02	split EP	
DW032	Blacklisted	We're Unstoppable	compilation	2005-04-26
DW033	The Power & The Glory	Call Me Armageddon	studio album	2004-06-01
DW034	Cast Aside	The Struggle	studio album	2007-07-13
DW035	100 Demons	100 Demons	studio album	2004-03-09
DW036	Holyghost	Holyghost	studio album	2007-04-03
DW037	Sex Positions	Sex Positions	studio album	2004-03-09
DW038	Blacklisted / First Blood	Dead Man's Hand 03	split EP	
DW039	Converge	You Fail Me (LP only; CD on Epitaph)	studio album	2004-09-21
DW040	Nine	Killing Angels	studio album	2003-09-15
DW041	Razor Crusade	Infinite Water	studio album	2004-07-13
DW042	So Be It	The Wrath of Skies	EP	
DW043	Embrace Today	We Are the Enemy	studio album	2005-07-12
DW044	Killing the Dream	I Rewrote It	EP	2005
DW045	Modern Life Is War	Witness	studio album	2005
DW046	Doomriders	Black Thunder	studio album	2005-08-09
DW047	Converge	Petitioning Forever	compilation	2006
DW048	Blacklisted	...The Beat Goes On	studio album	2005-11-08
DW049	Killing the Dream	In Place Apart	studio album	2005-09-13
DW050	Rise and Fall	Into Oblivion	studio album	2006-03-14
DW051	The Hope Conspiracy	Hang Your Cross	EP	2006
DW052	The Hope Conspiracy	Death Knows Your Name	studio album	2006-09-19
DW053	This Is Hell	Sundowning (LP only; CD on Trustkill)	studio album	2006
DW054	Life Long Tragedy / Final Fight	Split EP	split EP	
DW055	Modern Life Is War	My Love. My Way. (reissue; originally on Martyr)	studio album	2006
DW056	Shipwreck A.D.	Shipwreck	EP	2006
DW057	Converge	No Heroes (LP only; CD on Epitaph)	studio album	
DW058	Blacklisted	Peace on Earth, War on Stage	EP	2007
DW059	108	A New Beat from a Dead Heart	studio album	2007-06-26
DW060	The Great Deceiver	Life Is Wasted on the Living	studio album	2007-10-02
DW061	Rise and Fall	Clawing	EP	
DW062	Shipwreck A.D.	Abyss	studio album	2007-11-27
DW063	Life Long Tragedy	Runaways	studio album	2008-02-05
DW064	Killing the Dream	Fractures	studio album	2008-06-10
DW065	Cold World	Dedicated to Babies Who Came Feet First	studio album	2008-07-22
DW066	Trap Them	Séance Prime	EP	2007-10-30
DW067	Pulling Teeth	Martyr Immortal	studio album	2007-11-27
DW068	J. Bannon	"The Blood of Thine Enemies"	single	2008
DW069	Pulling Teeth / Irons	Grey Savior	split EP	2011
DW070	Blacklisted	Heavier Than Heaven, Lonelier Than God	studio album	2008-04-01
DW071	Doomriders / Disfear	Split EP	split EP	2008
DW072	Converge	Jane Doe (LP only; CD on Equal Vision)	studio album	2010
DW073	Trap Them / Extreme Noise Terror	Split EP	split EP	2008
DW074	The Carrier	No Love Can Save Me	EP	2008
DW075	Narrows	Narrows	EP	2008
DW076	Integrity	The Blackest Curse	studio album	2010
DW077	Narrows	New Distances	studio album	2009-05-12
DW078	Trap Them	Seizures in Barren Praise	studio album	2008-11-11
DW079	Carpathian	Isolation	studio album	2008-07-28
DW080	United Nations	Never Mind the Bombings, Here's Your Six Figures	EP	2010
DW081	Self Defense Family (End of a Year)	End of a Year	EP	2010
DW082	Pulling Teeth	Paranoid Delusions/Paradise Illusions	studio album	2009-03-31
DW083	Internal Affairs	Evil Egyptians	EP	2009
DW084	Wear Your Wounds	WYW	studio album	2017-04-07
DW085	Converge	Thousands of Miles Between Us	video album	2015-11-27
DW086	Ressurection	I Am Not: The Discography	compilation	2011
DW087	Victims	Killer	studio album	2008-03-14
DW088	Supermachiner	Rust	compilation	2009
DW089	Life Long Tragedy	Destined For Anything (reissue; originally on This Blessing, This Curse)	studio album	
DW090	The Hope Conspiracy	True Nihilist	EP	2009
DW091	Coliseum	"True Quiet / Last Wave"	single	2009
DW092	Reign Supreme	Testing the Limits of Infinite	studio album	2009-06-23
DW093	Lewd Acts	Black Eye Blues	studio album	2009-09-01
DW094	Victims	Lies, Lies, Lies	EP	2009
DW095	Doomriders	Darkness Come Alive	studio album	2009-09-29
DW096	Rise and Fall	Our Circle Is Vicious	studio album	2009-10-27
DW097	Acid Tiger	Acid Tiger	studio album	2010
DW098	Converge	Axe to Fall (LP only; CD on Epitaph)	studio album	2009-10-20
DW099	The Carrier	One Year Later (LP only; CD on Rock Vegas)	studio album	2010
DW100	Blacklisted	No One Deserves To Be Here More Than Me	studio album	2009
DW101	Starkweather	This Sheltering Night	studio album	2010
DW102	Trap Them	Séance Prime: The Complete Recordings	compilation	2011
DW103	Starkweather / Overmars	Split EP	split EP	2011
DW104	Self Defense Family (End of a Year)	You Are Beneath Me	studio album	2010
DW105	Carpathian	Wanderlust	EP	2010
DW106	Bitter End	Guilty As Charged	studio album	2010
DW107	Narrows / Heiress	Split EP	split EP	2010
DW108	108	18.61	studio album	2010-04-13
DW109	Horror Show	Notes from the Night That Never Ended	studio album	2010
DW110	Victims / Kylesa	Split EP (reissue; originally on La Familia)	split EP	2011
DW111	Killing the Dream	Lucky Me	studio album	2010-11-23
DW112	The Carrier	Blind to What Is Right	studio album	2011-01-18
DW113	Rot In Hell	As Pearls Before Swine	studio album	2011
DW114	American Nightmare (Give Up the Ghost)	Background Music (reissue; originally on Equal Vision)	studio album	2011
DW115	American Nightmare (Give Up the Ghost)	We're Down Til We're Underground (reissue; originally on Equal Vision)	studio album	2011
DW116	New Lows	Harvest of the Carcass	studio album	2011
DW117	Deafheaven	"Libertine Dissolves / Daedalus"	single	2011
DW118	Ceremony	Violence Violence (LP only; CD on Malfunction)	studio album	2010
DW119	Victims	A Dissident	studio album	2011-04-12
DW120	Deafheaven	Roads to Judah	studio album	2011-04-26
DW121	Touché Amoré	Parting the Sea Between Brightness and Me	studio album	2011-06-07
DW122	Oathbreaker	Mælstrøm	studio album	2011-07-05
DW123	Living Eyes	Starve for Agony	EP	2011-12-05
DW124	Self Defense Family (End of a Year)	"I'm Going Through Some Shit" / "All Fruit is Ripe"	single	2011-08-29
DW125	Rise and Fall	"Deceiver / Sinking In Sin"	single	2011-12-12
DW126	Rise and Fall	Hellmouth (reissue; originally on Surprise Attack/JTTP)	studio album	2012
DW127	Heiress	"Naysayer / Just Throats"	single	2012-03-26
DW128	Heiress	Early Frost	studio album	
DW129	Rise and Fall	Faith	studio album	2012-03-20
DW130	Punch	Nothing Lasts	EP	2011-12-05
DW131	Loma Prieta	I.V.	studio album	2012-01-17
DW132	American Nightmare (Give Up the Ghost)	Ice Age Demo (reissue; originally on Malfunction)	EP	2011
DW133	Narrows	Painted	studio album	2012-02-28
DW134	Self Defense Family (End of a Year)	"Self Immolation Family" / "World Virgins"	single	2012
DW135	Whips/Chains	Master/Slave	EP	2012-05-25
DW136	Touché Amoré	Live on BBC Radio 1	EP	2012
DW137	Birds in Row	You, Me & the Violence	studio album	2012-09-04
DW138	Living Eyes	Who Will Remain?	studio album	
DW139	Converge	All We Love We Leave Behind (LP only; CD on Epitaph)	studio album	2012-10-09
DW140	Code Orange Kids	Love Is Love/Return to Dust	studio album	2012-11-20
DW141	Touché Amoré / Pianos Become the Teeth	Split EP (co-released with Topshelf)	split EP	2013-01-08
DW142	Loma Prieta / Raein	Split EP	split EP	2013-05-20
DW143	Harm's Way	Blinded	EP	2013-06-24
DW144	Cold Cave	"Oceans with No End / People are Poison"	single	2013
DW145	AC4	Burn The World (released in partnership with Ny Våg)	studio album	2013-03-18
DW146	Deafheaven	Sunbather	studio album	2013-06-11
DW147	Oathbreaker	Eros|Anteros	studio album	2013-08-20
DW148	Doomriders	Grand Blood	studio album	2013-10-15
DW149	Harm Wülf	There's Honey in the Soil, So We Wait for the Till...	studio album	2013-11-11
DW150	Modern Life Is War	Fever Hunting	studio album	2013-09-09
DW151	Touché Amoré	Is Survived By	studio album	2013-09-24
DW152	Bossk	"Pick Up Artist / Albatross"	single	
DW153	Self Defense Family (End of a Year)	Try Me	studio album	2014-01-07
DW154	New Lows	Abhorrent Endings	EP	2014-03-03
DW155	Death of Lovers	Buried Under a World of Roses	EP	2014-02-04
DW156	Cursed	II (reissue; LP only; originally on Goodfellow)	studio album	2015-03-24
DW157	Converge	Live at the BBC	EP	2014-03-18
DW158	Cult Leader	Nothing for Us Here	EP	2014-04-15
DW159	Young and in the Way	When Life Comes to Death	studio album	2014-05-27
DW160	Wovenhand	Refractory Obdurate (released in partnership with Glitterhouse)	studio album	2014-04-29
DW161	Code Orange	I Am King	studio album	2014-09-02
DW162	Cold World	How the Gods Chill	studio album	2014-08-05
DW163	Touché Amoré	Live on BBC Radio 1: Vol 2	EP	2014-09-30
DW164	Coliseum	Coliseum (reissue; originally on Level Plane)	studio album	2014-08-19
DW165	Punch	They Don't Have to Believe	studio album	2014-08-19
DW166	Self Defense Family (End of a Year)	"Indoor Wind Chimes" / "Cottaging"	single	2014-10-14
DW167	Self Defense Family (End of a Year) / Creative Adult	Split EP (co-released by Run for Cover Records)	split EP	2015-03-10
DW168	Self Defense Family (End of a Year) / Touché Amoré	Self Love	split EP	2015-03-10
DW169	Blacklisted	When People Grow, People Go	studio album	2015-02-10
DW170	Self Defense Family (End of a Year)	Heaven Is Earth	studio album	2015-06-30
DW171	Burning Love	"Down So Long" / "Medicine Man"	single	2015-03-24
DW172	Fucked Up	"Year of the Hare"	single	2015-06-16
DW173	Coliseum	Anxiety's Kiss	studio album	2015-05-05
DW174	Harm's Way	Rust	studio album	2015-03-10
DW175	Chrome Over Brass	Chrome Over Brass	studio album	
DW176	Bitter End	Illusions of Dominance	studio album	2015-06-30
DW177	Self Defense Family (End of a Year)	"Talia" / "Taxying"	single	2015-04-18
DW178	American Nightmare (Give Up the Ghost)	Reunion Documentary	video album	
DW179	Cold Cave	Full Cold Moon (LP only; CD on Heartworm)	compilation	2015-06-16
DW180	Cult Leader	Useless Animal	EP	2015-06-16
DW181	Planes Mistaken for Stars	Mercy (reissue; originally on Abacus)	studio album	2015-07-14
DW182	Loma Prieta	Self Portrait	studio album	2015-10-02
DW183	Cult Leader	Lightless Walk	studio album	2015-10-16
DW184	Lies / White Jazz	Split EP	split EP	2015-10-30
DW185	Loma Prieta	"Love" / "Trilogy 0 (Debris)"	single	2015-07-24
DW186	Birds in Row	Personal War	EP	2015-10-30
DW187	Bossk	Audio Noir	studio album	2016-04-01
DW188	Death Index	Dream Machine	studio album	2016-02-26
DW189	Converge	You Fail Me Redux (reissue; LP only; CD on Epitaph)	studio album	2016-06-17
DW190	Frameworks	Smother	studio album	2016-07-08
DW191	Cursed	III: Architects of Troubled Sleep (reissue; LP only; originally on Goodfellow)	studio album	2016-07-22
DW192	Harm Wülf	Hijrah	studio album	2016-08-26
DW193	Planes Mistaken for Stars	Prey	studio album	2016-10-21
DW194				
DW195	Super Unison	Auto	studio album	2016-10-14
DW196	Oathbreaker	Rheia	studio album	2016-09-30
DW197	Self Defense Family (End of a Year)	BBC Session	EP	2017
DW198	Burn	Do or Die	studio album	2017-09-08
DW199	Converge	"I Can Tell You About Pain" / "Eve" (7" only; digital on Epitaph)	single	2017-09-15
DW200	Converge	The Dusk in Us (LP only; CD on Epitaph)	studio album	2017-11-03
DW201	Modern Life Is War	Tribulation Worksongs Vol. 1	EP	2018
DW202	Converge	Beautiful Ruin (7" only; digital on Epitaph)	EP	2018-06-29
DW203	Thou	Rhea Sylvia	EP	2018-07-27
DW204	Birds in Row	We Already Lost the World	studio album	2018-07-13
DW205	Super Unison	Stella	studio album	2018-10-26
DW206				
DW207	Gouge Away	Burnt Sugar	studio album	2018-09-28
DW208	Cult Leader	A Patient Man	studio album	2018-11-09
DW209	Modern Life Is War	Tribulation Worksongs Vol. 2	EP	2018
DW210	Hesitation Wounds	Chicanery	studio album	2019-08-30
DW211				
DW212	Wear Your Wounds	Rust on the Gates of Heaven	studio album	2019-07-12
DW213	HarborLights	Isolation Ritual	studio album	2019-09-13
DW214	Process Black	Countdown Failure	EP	2019-10-25
DW215	Frail Body	A Brief Memoriam	EP	2019-11-01
DW216	Greet Death	New Hell	studio album	2019-11-08
DW217	Blacklisted	Eye for an Eye	EP	2020-05-01
DW218	Oathbreaker	Ease Me & 4 Interpretations	EP	2020-05-08
DW219	Loma Prieta	"Continuum" / "Fate"	single	2020-01-10
DW220	The Hope Conspiracy	Death Knows Your Name (reissue)	studio album	2022-01-14
DW221	Bossk	Migration	studio album	2021-06-18
DW222	Umbra Vitae	Shadow of Life	studio album	2020-05-01
DW223	Gouge Away	"Stray"	single	2019
DW224	Quentin Sauvé	Whatever It Takes	studio album	2020-02-01
DW225	American Nightmare (Give Up the Ghost)	"Life Support" / "Left for Dead"	single	2020-02-14
DW226	Gouge Away	"Consider" / "Wave of Mutilation"	single	2020-03-20
DW227	Blood from the Soul	DSM-5	studio album	2020-11-13
DW228	Blunt Razors	Early Aughts	EP	2020-11-20
DW229	Planes Mistaken for Stars	Do You Still Love Me?	studio album	2024
DW230	Modern Life is War	Tribulation Worksongs Vol. 3	EP	2021-12-17
DW231	Converge	The Dusk in Us Deluxe (reissue)	studio album	2023
DW232				
DW233				
DW234	Greet Death	New Low	EP	2022-06-24
DW235				
DW236	Converge	Bloodmoon: I (LP only; CD on Epitaph)	studio album	2021-11-19
DW237	Chastity	Suffer Summer	studio album	2022-01-13
DW238	Frail Body	A Brief Memoriam (Live)	live album	2022
DW239	Loma Prieta	Last	studio album	2023
DW240	Frail Body	Artificial Bouquet	studio album	2024
DW241	Cult Leader / End	Gather & Mourn (co-released by Closed Casket Activities)	split EP	2022-09-09
DW242				
DW243	Modern Life Is War	Tribulation Worksongs	EP / compilation	2023
DW244	Bossk	.4	studio album	2024
DW245				
DW246				
DW247	Mad Honey	Satellite Aphrodite	studio album	2023
DW248	The Hope Conspiracy	Tools of Oppression / Rule by Deception	studio album	2024
DW249	Gouge Away	Deep Sage	studio album	2024
DW250	Glare	Sunset Funeral	studio album	2025
DW251	Deafheaven	Sunbather (10th Anniversary Remix / Remaster)	studio album	2023
DW252	Touché Amoré	Is Survived By: Revived (remixed and remastered)	studio album	2023
DW253	Umbra Vitae	Light of Death	studio album	2024
DW254	The Hope Conspiracy	Confusion/Chaos/Misery	EP	2023
DW255				
DW256	State Faults	Children of the Moon	studio album	2024
DW257	Chastity	Trilogy	compilation	2023
DW258	Cult Leader	"Learn to Love It"	single	2024
DW259	Eye for an Eye	Omega Drone / Who (remaster / reissue)	compilation	2024
DW260	Chastity	Chastity	studio album	2024
DW261				
DW262	Glare	"Mourning Haze"	single	2024
DW263	Mad Honey	Discordia	studio album	2024

== Sub-discographies ==
=== Limited edition album catalog ===
Catalog	Artist(s)	Album
DWLIMITED01	Various artists	Singles Collection (compilation)
DWLIMITED02	Some Girls	The Rains & The Blues (compilation)
DWLIMITED03	Doomriders	Live at the Middle East (EP)
DWLIMITED04	Converge	Petitioning Forever bonus 7" (EP)
DWLIMITED05	Cold World	Boombyebye (EP)
DWLIMITED06	Pulling Teeth	Witches Sabbath 01 (EP)
DWLIMITED07	Pulling Teeth	Witches Sabbath 05 (EP)

=== Digital live album catalog ===
Catalog	Artist(s)	Album
DWLIVE01	Blacklisted	Live On WERS 2006
DWLIVE02	Converge	Minneapolis, MN 09.21.05
DWLIVE03	Pulling Teeth	Sound & Fury 2K7
DWLIVE04	Bitter End	Sound & Fury 2K7
DWLIVE05	The Hope Conspiracy	Live In Europe
DWLIVE06	Narrows	Live at KEXP 09.26.10
DWLIVE07	Touché Amoré	Live at WERS
DWLIVE08	Deafheaven	Live at The Blacktop
DWLIVE09	New Lows	Live on WERS

== Footnotes ==
A. Two changes were made to the catalog numbers to help the table's sorting feature function in its intended fashion. First, Deathwish's catalog numbers were previously preceded by the letters "DWI", but newer releases are only preceded by "DW". All releases listed here are preceded by "DW" for uniformity. Secondly, additional zeros were added to single- and double-digit catalog numbers also with the intent of assisting the table's sorting feature.
