= George Hirsch (musician) =

American musician (born 1984)

- Also known as: Harm Wülf, Rose Clouds
- Born: 1984 (age 41–42)
- Origin: Philadelphia, Pennsylvania, U.S.
- Genres: Hardcore punk, folk rock
- Instruments: Vocals, guitar, harmonica, percussion
- Labels: Deathwish, Six Feet Under, Relapse
- Member of: Blacklisted, Staticlone, Colossal Rains

George Hirsch is an American musician who performs as a vocalist in the hardcore band Blacklisted. In the 2020s, Hirsch co-founded the bands Staticlone and Colossal Rains. He's recorded solo material in the monikers Harm Wülf and Rose Clouds. He was originally from Philadelphia, Pennsylvania but later moved to Chicago, Illinois.

== Music career ==
When his previous band broke up, George Hirsch co-founded the hardcore punk band Blacklisted in 2003.

After Blacklisted released the more experimental album No One Deserves To Be Here More Than Me in 2009, the band entered an undeclared hiatus state as each member focused on their respective new families and lives. In this downtime, Hirsch launched his solo project Harm Wülf, a stripped down semi-acoustic act that's often described as "dark folk". He released his debut album as Harm Wülf titled There's Honey In the Soil So We Wait for the Till... in November 2013 through Deathwish Inc.

Three years later, Harm Wülf released its second studio album Hijrah in August 2016 through Deathwish. Hirsch has said he felt like his debut album was more of a demo in some ways and that Hijrah felt like a more proper album. The album's cover art is a photo of the Solheimasandur plane crash in Iceland taken by Hirsch himself and chosen as the cover because it fit the theme of the album. Hirsch said: "I was torn at first because it is such a recognizable attraction. But, in the end it fit the album/feel so well. It lends itself perfectly to escape, exile, and the abandon I've felt, before ultimately learning the survival I needed. While writing the album I also had an obsession with this certain color; it's a blue, but has hints of green and purple as well."

In the early 2020s, Hirsch began releasing solo music under his home recording moniker Rose Clouds. Around this time, Hirsch also formed the hardcore band Staticlone with fellow former Blacklisted members David Walling and Jeff Ziga. Staticlone released its debut album Better Living Through Static Vision in 2025 through Relapse Records. Hirsch said the band explores the sound that the bands he grew up listening to were playing and that shaped who he is today, including Agnostic Front, Discharge, and Cro-Mags.

Shortly after forming Staticlone, Hirsch also formed the band Colossal Rains also with Walling in addition to Tyler Mullen (Scarab, Gridiron) and Jon-Michael Nean. Colossal Rains released its debut album Feral Sorrow in 2026 through Memory Music recorded with Will Yip. The band's sludge metal sound was influenced by Neurosis and Crowbar, as well as being loosely inspired by the 1982 film Blade Runner. In a press release, Hirsch elaborated: "I've had a poster of Blade Runner above my desk. Looking at the poster, I kept thinking about how badly I wanted to get on one of those ships -- climb through one of the engines or into a cargo hold and just be a stowaway headed for a new life. But I knew I couldn't."

== Discography ==
=== Harm Wülf ===
- There's Honey In the Soil So We Wait for the Till... (2013)
- Hijrah (2016)

=== Rose Clouds ===
- Doldrums Heavy Shadows (2020)
- Until The Candle Burns Down (2021)

=== Blacklisted ===
- ...The Beat Goes On (2005)
- Heavier Than Heaven, Lonelier Than God (2008)
- No One Deserves To Be Here More Than Me (2009)
- When People Grow, People Go (2015)

=== Staticlone ===
- Better Living Through Static Vision (2025)

=== Colossal Rains ===
- Feral Sorrow (2026)

=== As guest musician ===
Year	Band	Album	Track
2008	Ceremony	Still Nothing Moves You	"Entropy No Meaning Is Also An Answer"
2008	Cold World	Dedicated to Babies Who Came Feet First	"Dedicated To Babies Who Came Feet First"
2009	Converge	Axe to Fall	"Axe to Fall"
2013	Defeater	Letters Home	"No Relief"
2014	Cold World	How the Gods Chill	"Omega" (contributing lyricist)
2016	Nails	You Will Never Be One of Us	"You Will Never Be One Of Us" (contributing lyricist)
2025	Scarab	Burn After Listening	"Withdrawn"
