= Alex Garcia-Rivera =

American drummer

- Also known as: Chrome Over Brass
- Origin: Boston, Massachusetts, United States
- Occupations: Musician, recording engineer, drum technician
- Instrument: Drums

Alex Garcia-Rivera is an American rock drummer, drum-tech and recording engineer from Boston, Massachusetts. He has been the drummer for the bands Shelter, Piebald, Good Clean Fun, Bloodhorse, 454 Big Block, Saves The Day, Cold Cave, but is best known as the drummer for hardcore/punk band American Nightmare. He also performs all instruments in a solo band under the moniker Chrome Over Brass and owns and operates Mystic Valley Studio, an all-analog recording studio in Medford, Massachusetts.

== Touring band member ==
Alex Garcia-Rivera has been a touring drummer for the bands Shelter, Better Than a Thousand, Saves the Day, Piebald, Avoid One Thing, and Cold Cave.

== Discography ==
=== American Nightmare ===
- American Nightmare (2018, Rise Records)
- We're Down Til We're Underground (2003, Equal Vision Records)

=== Chrome Over Brass ===
- 16 Tracks of Feedback (EP) (2013)
- "Stukas in the Wind" (single) (2014)
- "Teenage Depression" (single) (2015)
- Chrome Over Brass (2015)
- Soulstice (single) (2016)

==== Ascend/Descend ====
- Murdock Street (2016)
- Molt (single) (2017)

==== Kingpin ====
- Holding Tomorrow (EP) (1991, Suburban Voice)

==== 454 Big Block ====
- Save Me from Myself (1998, Big Wheel Recreation)

==== Get High ====
- Get High (1999, Big Wheel Recreation)
- II (1999, self-released)

==== Piebald ====
- The Rock Revolution Will Not Be Televised (2000, Big Wheel Recreation)
- Barely Legal/All Ages (2001, Big Wheel Recreation)

==== Good Clean Fun ====
- Straight Outta Hardcore (2001, Phyte/Reflections/Defiance)

==== Never Surrender ====
- Never Surrender (EP) (2003, Fight Fire with Fire)

==== Face the Enemy ====
- These Two Words (2003, Defiance)

==== Give Up the Ghost ====
- We're Down Til We're Underground (2003, Equal Vision)

==== Bloodhorse ====
- Black Lung Rising (2006, self-released)
- Bloodhorse (EP) (2007, Translation Loss)
- Horizoner (2009, Translation Loss)
- A Malign Star (2025, Iodine)

==== Confessions ====
- Your Girl (EP) (2013, Vanya)

=== As drum technician ===
- Mutoid Man - War Moans - Sargent House
- Four Year Strong - Four Year Strong - Pure Noise Records
- Jejune – This Afternoons Malady – Big Wheel Recreation
- Madball – Look My Way – Roadrunner Records
- In My Eyes – Nothing To Hide – Revelation Records
- Converge – No Heroes – Epitaph Records
- Converge – Axe to Fall – Epitaph Records
- Converge – All We Love We Leave Behind – Epitaph Records
- Converge - The Dusk In Us - Epitaph Records, Deathwish Inc.
- The Hope Conspiracy – Death Knows Your Name – Deathwish Inc.
- Coliseum – No Salvation – Relapse Records
- Animosity – Animal – Metal Blade Records
- Piebald – Accidental Gentleman – SideOneDummy Records
- Clouds – We Are Above You – Hydra Head Records
- Cruel Hand – Prying Eyes – Bridge 9 Records
- Blacklisted – Heavier Than Heaven, Lonelier Than God – Deathwish Inc.
- Energy – Invasions of the Mind – Bridge 9 Records
- Soul Control – Cycles – Bridge 9 Records
- Verse – Aggression – Rivalry Records.
- Dead Swans – Sleepwalkers – Bridge 9 Records
- High on Fire – De Vermis Mysteriis – E1 Music
- High On Fire - Luminiferous - Entertainment One Music
- Beastmilk – Climax
- Vallenfyre – Splinters
- Mountain Man - "TWO" - No Sleep Records

=== As recording engineer/producer ===
- American Nightmare (band) - American Nightmare - Rise Records
- Vundabar - Gawk
- Ascend/Descend - Murdock Street - Dead Tank Records
- Bloodhorse – EP – Translation Loss
- Bloodhorse – Horizoner – Translation Loss
- 108 – 18.61 – Deathwish Inc.
- Covey - Haggarty
- Draize – Draize – Punks Before Profits
- One Happy Island – Split 7" – Thee Sheffield Phonographic Corporation
- Mountain Man – Grief – Think Fast! Records
- Cerce – Cerce – It's A Trap! Records / Solidarity Recordings
- Native Wildlife – A Simple Life, A Quiet Mind
- Obsidian Tongue – Volume I: Subradiant Architecture
- Obsidian Tongue – A Nest of Ravens in the Throat of Time – Hypnotic Dirge Records
- Lovechild – Demonstration
- No Flowers – EP One
- No Flowers – EP Two
- No Flowers – EP Three
- Dave Austin and the Sound – The Revival
- Wormwood – Wormwood
- CAZADOR — Broken Sun
- Covey - Haggarty
- The Oracle - Book I - End Result Productions
