= We Already Lost the World =

Studio album by Birds in Row
- Released: July 13, 2018
- Studio: The Apiary
- Genre: Hardcore punk, post-hardcore
- Length: 34:17
- Label: Deathwish (DW204)
- Producer: Amaury Sauve

Birds in Row chronology
Birds in Row / WAITC (2015)	We Already Lost the World (2018)	Gris Klein (2022)

We Already Lost the World is the second studio album by the French punk band Birds in Row. The album was released on July 13, 2018 through Deathwish Inc. The album is the first release of since 2015's split EP with WAITC, and the band's first full-length album in six years since their 2012 debut, You, Me & the Violence. The album's title and lose lyrical themes touch on the band's political and social views toward life. In an interview, they said: "We Already Lost the World means [the world is] not in our hands yet, but it could be if we worked together for the common good."

Birds in Row began promoting We Already Lost the World with an online stream of "15-38" in May 2018. Two months later in July, the band released a stream and music video for the track "I Don't Dance". The video was directed by Craig Murray and depicts two ballerinas that start off dancing, but slowly transition into martial arts. Birds in Row began touring in support of the album with a string of US shows in July–August 2018—initially as support for Converge and Neurosis, but later as a headliner with Portrayal of Guilt.

Writing for Exclaim!, Joe Smith-Engelhardt praised the album with an eight-out-of-ten rating. In his review, he wrote: "Although it took a little while to see the light of day due in part to lineup changes, We Already Lost the World is an impressive piece of melodic noise punk. The record strikes a great balance between heavy and clean tones while building the band's sound into something unexpected, further solidifying their position next to other great acts within the genre."

== Track listing ==
All music by Birds in Row.

1. "We Count So We Don't Have To Listen" – 3:11
2. "Love Is Political" – 2:47
3. "We vs. Us" – 4:52
4. "Remember Us Better Than We Are" – 5:09
5. "I Don't Dance" – 3:03
6. "15-38" – 3:19
7. "Triste Sire" – 1:38
8. "Morning" – 4:27
9. "Fossils" – 5:51

== Personnel ==
Album personnel adapted from CD liner notes.

- Birds in Row – all music
- Amaury Sauve – recording, mixing
- Thibault Chaumont – mastering
- Juliette Bates – photographs
