= Isolation (Carpathian album) =

Studio album by Carpathian
- Released: (Australia) 2 August 2008
- Recorded: The Getaway Group, Boston and Complex Studios, Melbourne
- Genre: Hardcore punk
- Length: 25:57
- Label: Resist Records; Deathwish (DWI79)
- Producer: Jay Maas & Roman Koester

Carpathian chronology
Wrecked 7" (2007)	"Isolation" (2008)	Carpathian/Shipwreck AD (2009)

Isolation is the second studio album by Australian hardcore punk band Carpathian. The album peaked at No. 19 on the Australian ARIA Charts. The song "'Permanent" takes lyrics from "Something Must Break" by Joy Division. The title track and "Ceremony" also share their names with Joy Division songs. It reached No. 1 in the ShortFastLoud top 40 countdown of the year on triple J.

== Track listing ==
No.	Title	Length
1.	"Isolation"	1:43
2.	"Cursed"	3:03
3.	"Spirals"	2:00
4.	"Insomnia"	2:33
5.	"The Cold Front"	2:58
6.	"Deadbeats..."	1:45
7.	"Sun Heights"	2:53
8.	"Seventyk"	3:09
9.	"Ceremony"	3:02
10.	"Permanent"	2:49

== Charts ==
Chart (2008)	Peak position
Australian ARIA Albums Chart	19

== Personnel ==
- Martin Kirby – vocals
- Josh Manitta – guitar
- Lloyd Carroll – guitar
- Ed Redclift – bass guitar, additional vocals on "Deadbeats..."
- David Bichard – drums
- JD of Shipwreck Ad – additional lyrics and vocals on "Cursed"
- Pat Flynn of Have Heart – additional vocals on "Ceremony"
- Roman Koester – drum recording
- Tony 'Jack The Bear' Mantz – mastering at Deluxe Mastering, Melbourne
- DFAXXX – design
