= Fractures (Killing the Dream album) =

Studio album by Killing the Dream
- Released: June 10, 2008
- Genre: Hardcore punk
- Length: 23:55
- Label: Deathwish (DWI64)
- Producer: J. Robbins

Killing the Dream chronology
In Place Apart (2005)	Fractures (2008)	Lucky Me (2010)

Professional ratings
Review scores
Source	Rating
AbsolutePunk	(79%)
Exclaim!	(favorable)
Punknews.org	3.5/5 stars

Fractures is the second studio album by the American hardcore punk band Killing the Dream. The album was released on June 10, 2008 through Deathwish Inc. Fractures was produced by J. Robbins of the 90s post-hardcore group Jawbox, and the artwork was designed by Jacob Bannon of the hardcore group Converge.

== Track listing ==
1. "(Re)acquaintance" – 0:39
2. "Part II (Motel Art)" – 2:22
3. "Fractures" – 2:45
4. "Thirty Four Seconds" – 2:37
5. "Consequence (What Comes Next)" – 2:47
6. "Everything But Everything" – 1:58
7. "Hang the Jury" – 1:34
8. "We Were" – 1:18
9. "You're All Welcome" – 1:09
10. "Thirteen Steps" – 0:38
11. "Holding the Claws" – 1:45
12. "Resolution" – 4:23
