= We're Unstoppable =

Compilation album by Blacklisted
- Released: April 26, 2005
- Genre: Hardcore punk
- Length: 17:53
- Label: Deathwish (DWI32)

Blacklisted chronology
The Dead Man's Hand 03 (2004)	We're Unstoppable (2005)	...The Beat Goes On (2005)

We're Unstoppable is a compilation album by the Philadelphia hardcore band Blacklisted. It is a compilation of their demo which was released in 2003, and their Our Youth Is Wasted EP which was released later on that year. It was rated four stars by Punknews.org.

== Track listing ==
1. "Long Way Home" – 0:56
2. "Finding Faith" – 1:57
3. "That Ain't Real Much" – 1:30
4. "Crossed Fingers" – 1:35
5. "3800 (We're Unstoppable)" – 2:40
6. "Transparent/Opaque" – 2:28
7. "My Advice" – 1:13
8. "Back And Forth" – 1:44
9. "Left Alone" – 2:01
10. "Who I Am" – 1:49
