= Grand Blood =

Studio album by Doomriders
- Released: October 15, 2013
- Recorded: February 2013
- Genre: Sludge metal
- Length: 40:18
- Label: Deathwish (DW148)
- Producer: Kurt Ballou

Doomriders chronology
Are We Not Men? (2012)	Grand Blood (2013)

Professional ratings
Aggregate scores
Source	Rating
Metacritic	75/100
Review scores
Source	Rating
Pitchfork	5.8/10
Metal Injection	6.5/10
Exclaim!	7/10

Grand Blood is the third studio album from the American rock band Doomriders. The album was released on October 15, 2013, through Deathwish Inc. Doomriders began writing material for Grand Blood as early as 2011. The Kurt Ballou-produced album will be the band's first release of original material since 2009's Darkness Come Alive, and will also be the first album with drummer Q, who is also a member of the band Clouds.

Prior to the release of Grand Blood, Doomriders released an online stream of "Dead Friends" to promote the album. Written by guitarist and vocalist Nate Newton, the song "Dead Friends" is about four of his recently deceased friends. Newton said he didn't know how to approach writing the song and had waited for a long time. He said, "I didn't want it to be sad, I wanted it to be a celebration. I'm not going to sugar coat it. It's sad. But you can't spend your whole life in grief." About the loss theme of Grand Blood, Newton said, "The record focuses on getting older and dealing with death and all the responsibilities I was shirking most of my life. It's about looking in the mirror and taking responsibility."

== Track listing ==
1. untitled – 0:24
2. "New Pyramids" – 3:44
3. "Mankind" – 2:36
4. "Grand Blood" – 3:42
5. "Bad Vibes" – 3:27
6. "Dead Friends" – 3:57
7. "Death in Heat" – 5:48
8. "We Live in the Shadows" – 4:22
9. "Gone to Hell" – 3:32
10. "Back Taxes" – 3:01
11. "Father Midnight" – 5:45
