= 100 Demons (album) =

Studio album by 100 Demons
- Released: March 9, 2004
- Genres: Hardcore punk, metalcore
- Length: 24:19
- Label: Deathwish (DWI35)
- Producer: Chris "Zeuss" Harris

100 Demons chronology
In the Eyes of the Lord (2000)	100 Demons (album) (2004)	Embrace the Black Light (2026)

Professional ratings
Review scores
Source	Rating
AllMusic	3/5 stars

100 Demons is American hardcore band 100 Demons' second album.

Again, produced by Chris "Zeuss" Harris, and released on the label Deathwish Inc. in 2004. A heavier album at times, yet employing clean singing into their sound along with their brand of hardcore on certain songs. The guitar riffs are also vastly more varied, adding metalcore to their existing hardcore punk sound featured on In the Eyes of the Lord (2000).

Track 9 is a re-recording, previously released on the compilation album A Breed Apart: Outside Looking In released in the year 2000, on NGS Records

== Track listing ==
No.	Title	Length
1.	"Time Bomb"	2:54
2.	"Destiny Never Came"	2:42
3.	"Dying in My Own Arms"	2:23
4.	"Repeat Process"	3:21
5.	"Something Terrible"	3:20
6.	"Lord Have Mercy"	2:19
7.	"Non Believer"	2:33
8.	"His Father's Son"	3:19
9.	"Never Surrender Virtue (No Desit Virtus)"	2:48

== Credits ==
- Pete Morcey - vocals
- Rick Brayall - guitar
- Jeremy Braddock - guitar
- Erik Barrett - bass
- Rich Rosa - drums

Production

- Zeuss - producer, engineering, mixing
- Alan Douches - mastering
- Jacob Bannon - design
- Lou Jacque - artwork
- Jason Hellmann - photography
