= Only in the Morning =

EP by Breather Resist
- Released: March 25, 2003
- Genre: Mathcore
- Length: 22:08
- Label: Deathwish (DWI26)

Breather Resist chronology
The Second Half (2003)	Only in the Morning (2003)	Charmer (2004)

Professional ratings
Review scores
Source	Rating
Allmusic	2/5 stars
Exclaim!	(positive)
Punknews.org	2.5/5 stars

Only in the Morning is an EP by the American rock band Breather Resist. The album was released on March 25, 2003, through Deathwish Inc.

== Track listing ==
1. "Just Do It" – 2:40
2. "The Pity Party" – 3:19
3. "Died to Be Famous" – 1:20
4. "The Best Mistake" – 1:38
5. "Pretty Like Cancer" – 2:14
6. "Cruciform Casket" – 1:59
7. "It Stops One" – 2:36
8. "It Stops Two" – 6:22
