= Lucky Me =

Lucky Me or LuckyMe may refer to:

== Music ==
- LuckyMe (record label)
- Lucky Me (album), a 2020 album by Killing the Dream
- Lucky Me, a 2001 album by Lucky Luciano
- Lucky Me (EP), a 2002 EP by Duke Special
- "Lucky Me" (Anne Murray song), 1980
- "Lucky Me" (Bachelor Girl song), 1998
- "Lucky Me", a song by Big Sean, from the album Detroit 2
- "Lucky Me", a song by Chris Brown, from the album Graffiti
- "Lucky Me", a song by Jay-Z, from the album In My Lifetime, Vol. 1
- "Lucky Me", a song by The Moments
- "Lucky Me", a song by Sarah Slean

== Other ==
- Lucky Me (film), a 1954 comedy starring Doris Day, Robert Cummings and Phil Silvers
- Lucky Me, a 2013 autobiography by Sachi Parker about her life and mother Shirley MacLaine
- Lucky Me (noodles), a brand of instant noodles owned by Monde Nissin
- "Lucky Me", an episode of the series Ruby Gloom

== See also ==
- "Lucky Me, Lucky You", a 1997 song by Lee Roy Parnell
- "Lucky, Lucky Me", a 1964 song by Marvin Gaye
- Lucky Lucky Me, a 1985 album by The LeRoi Brothers
- Lucky to Me, a 1939 British musical comedy film
