= Bloodhorse =

Bloodhorse or Blood horse may refer to:

- Horse breeding (especially Thoroughbred horse breeding)
  - The Blood-Horse and Bloodhorse.com, a magazine and website published by majority shareholder, The Jockey Club
  - Blood-Horse Publications, the publishing arm of The Jockey Club
- Hot-blooded horse, a breed of light horse with a lively temperament
- Bloodhorse (band), a metal band from Boston, Massachusetts
