= Nothing for Us Here =

EP by Cult Leader
- Released: April 15, 2014
- Genre: Hardcore punk, crust punk, grindcore
- Length: 17:42
- Label: Deathwish (DW158)
- Producer: Wes Johnson

Cult Leader chronology
Nothing for Us Here (2014)	Useless Animal (2015)

Nothing for Us Here is the debut EP by the American rock band Cult Leader. The EP was released on April 15, 2014 through Deathwish Inc. Cult Leader created Nothing for Us Here in about a week and were planning on self-releasing it. After sending a copy to their friend Jacob Bannon of Converge to see what he thought of it, Bannon suggested releasing the EP through his own label, Deathwish. The title of the EP has a few different meanings for Cult Leader. Vocalist Anthony Lucero said one meaning is about the end of his previous band Gaza and how "everything we worked for was just falling apart," and it's also a reference to "the breath of the death: the moment when there's no more life left in you and you have to face oblivion." Lucero also created the album's artwork.

Nothing for Us Here received generally positive reviews upon release. Jason Schreurs of Exclaim! have the EP an eight-out-of-ten score, and concluded his review stating: "Not nearly the frenetic headache that Gaza [a now defunct band featuring three members of Cult Leader] was, Cult Leader have found that sweet spot between early Napalm Death and later Converge. It's more punk/core than it is metal, but Nothing for Us Here should please anyone who wakes up in the morning hunting for a dizzying migraine." Dean Brown of PopMatters gave the album seven-out-of-ten stars, and concluded his review stating: "It is a mouth-whetting taster of what we could expect from a Cult Leader full-length album, if the band continues to make more music together. Let's just pray to the vacuous black hole in the sky that this band does make more music as violent and intelligently formed as that found on its first EP, Nothing for Us Here."

== Track listing ==
1. "God's Lonely Children" – 1:39
2. "Flightless Birds" – 2:19
3. "Mongrel" – 2:36
4. "Indoctrinator's Deathbed" – 2:10
5. "Skincrawler" – 2:52
6. "Driftwood" – 6:06

== Personnel ==
Nothing for Us Here personnel adapted from AllMusic.

=== Cult Leader ===
- Casey Hansen – drums
- Anthony Lucero – vocals
- Mike Mason – guitar
- Sam Richards – bass

=== Other personnel ===
- Wes Johnson – engineering, mastering
- Bryce Kresge – design, layout
- Anthony Lucero – artwork
