= Black Thunder (album) =

Studio album by Doomriders
- Released: August 9, 2005
- Recorded: February 2005
- Genre: Stoner metal
- Length: 45:37
- Label: Deathwish (DWI46)

Doomriders chronology
Black Thunder (2005)	Live from the Middle East (2006)

Professional ratings
Review scores
Source	Rating
AllMusic	3.5/5 stars
Drowned in Sound	7/10
PopMatters	7/10
Lambgoat	6/10

Black Thunder is the debut studio album by the American rock band Doomriders. The album was released on August 9, 2005 through Deathwish Inc. Geoff Summers of Noisecreep noted that the album had a "strong party vibe". The cover art for Black Thunder was painted by Doomriders' bassist Jebb Riley.

== Track listing ==
1. "Black Thunder" – 2:39
2. "The Long Walk" – 4:47
3. "Ride or Die" – 4:09
4. "Deathbox" – 2:35
5. "Listen Up!!" – 3:54
6. "Midnight Eye" – 4:41
7. "Fuck This Shit" – 1:09
8. "Worthless" – 1:50
9. "The Chase" – 4:15
10. "Voice of Fire" – 5:40
11. "Drag Them Down" – 2:43
12. "The Whipcrack" – 1:47
13. "Sirens" – 5:28
