= Unsatisfied (disambiguation) =

"Unsatisfied" is a 1984 song by American rock band the Replacements.

Unsatisfied may also refer to:

- "Unsatisfied", a song by The Copyrights from Make Sound
- "Unsatisfied", a song by Waylon Jennings from Good Hearted Woman
- "Unsatisfied", a song by Nine Black Alps from Everything Is
- "Unsatisfied", a song by Pulling Teeth from Paranoid Delusions/Paradise Illusions
