= A Patient Man =

Studio album by Cult Leader
- Released: November 9, 2018
- Studio: God City Studios, Salem, Massachusetts
- Genre: Metalcore; sludge metal
- Length: 47:52
- Label: Deathwish (DW208)
- Producer: Kurt Ballou

Cult Leader chronology
Lightless Walk (2015)	A Patient Man (2018)	Gather & Mourn (2022)

Professional ratings
Review scores
Source	Rating
Exclaim	Positive
Metal Hammer	4/5 stars
Metal Injection	8.5/10

A Patient Man is the second studio album by American hardcore punk band Cult Leader. It was released on November 9, 2018, on Deathwish, Inc.

== Track listing ==
No.	Title	Length
1.	"I Am Healed"	3:56
2.	"Curse of Satisfaction"	3:53
3.	"Isolation in the Land of Milk and Honey"	5:18
4.	"To: Achlys"	6:15
5.	"A World of Joy"	5:57
6.	"Craft of Mourning"	2:10
7.	"Share My Pain"	2:56
8.	"Aurum Reclusa"	3:23
9.	"A Patient Man"	7:32
10.	"The Broken Right Hand of God"	6:32

== Personnel ==
=== Cult Leader ===
- Michael Mason - Guitar
- Anthony Lucero - Vocals
- Casey Hansen - Drums
- Sam Richards - Bass

=== Production ===
- Kurt Ballou – engineering, mixing
- Brad Boatright – mastering
- Maxwell Kreutzelman - lyrics

=== Artwork and packaging ===
- Anthony Lucero – artwork
- Jacob Bannon – layout
