= Useless Animal =

EP by Cult Leader
- Released: June 16, 2015
- Genre: Crust punk, hardcore punk
- Length: 9:35
- Label: Deathwish (DW180)
- Producer: Andy Patterson

Cult Leader chronology
| Nothing for Us Here (2014) | Useless Animal (2015) | Lightless Walk (2015) |

Useless Animal is an extended play by the American metalcore band Cult Leader. Released through Deathwish Inc. on June 16, 2015, the EP features two exclusive tracks (the original composition "Useless Animal" and the cover song "You Are Not My Blood") and one original composition titled "Gutter Gods" that would later be released on the band's 2015 debut album, Lightless Walk. Useless Animal was recorded in late 2014 by Andy Patterson, who previously recorded the 2009 album He Is Never Coming Back by Gaza—the now-defunct band that featured three members and gave birth to Cult Leader.

== Critical reception ==
Music critics noted the first two tracks, "Useless Animal" and "Gutter Gods," sounded both familiar and exemplary of Cult Leader's signature sound. Writing for Exclaim, Denise Falzon gave the EP a nine-out-of-ten and called these two tracks: "raw, chaotic attacks of heavy, grinding noise filled with furious, tormented aggression." Writing for SLUG Magazine, Megan Kennedy praised the EP and said these two tracks, "are short tracks, like brutal slashes with rusty blades, but there is so much energy and atmosphere in their frantic, ugly rhythms." Many critics highly praised the EP's B-side "You Are Not My Blood," a cover song originally by the indie/folk collaboration between Mark Kozelek and Desertshore from their eponymous 2013 album, Mark Kozelek & Desertshore. Cult Leader was joined on the cover song by Kim Pack and Sarah Pendleton of the fellow Salt Lake City–based doom/sludge metal band SubRosa, who Falzon called "superbly talented." She elaborated that the track, "pairs surprisingly well with the jarring, distorted hostility of the first two numbers, and takes Useless Animal to another level entirely. Kennedy called the song "the stand-out track" of the EP, described Anthony Lucero's singing vocals as "an enjoyable surprise" and said the additional Subrosa members helped Cult Leader "showcase their range with this deep, brooding dirge." Michael Nelson of Stereogum described the song as, "a dirge-y, doom-y thing that pretty seamlessly combines both Cult Leader and SubRosa's sounds, actually—and pays fitting homage to Kozelek's sound, too."

== Track listing ==
1. "Useless Animal" – 1:14
2. "Gutter Gods" – 1:32
3. "You Are Not My Blood" (originally by Mark Kozelek and Desertshore) – 6:49

== Personnel ==
Useless Animal personnel adapted from 7" vinyl liner notes.

=== Cult Leader ===
- Michael Mason
- Anthony Lucero
- Casey Hansen
- Sam Richards

=== Additional musicians ===
- Kim Pack (SubRosa) – violins on "You Art Not My Blood" and "Useless Animal"
- Sarah Bendleton (SubRosa) – violins on "You Art Not My Blood" and "Useless Animal"

=== Production ===
- Andy Patterson – engineering

=== Artwork and packaging ===
- Anthony Lucero – artwork
- Metal Jeff – photos, layout
