= Lightless Walk =

Studio album by Cult Leader
- Released: October 16, 2015
- Studio: God City
- Genre: Metalcore, sludge metal
- Length: 36:42
- Label: Deathwish (DW183)
- Producer: Kurt Ballou

Cult Leader chronology
Useless Animal (2015)	Lightless Walk (2015)	A Patient Man (2018)

Professional ratings
Review scores
Source	Rating
Exclaim	10/10
Pitchfork	7.5/10.0
Revolver	4/5

Lightless Walk is the debut studio album by American metalcore band Cult Leader. The album was released on October 16, 2015 through Deathwish Inc. and produced by Kurt Ballou of Converge. The track "Gutter Gods" previously appeared on Cult Leader's 2015 EP Useless Animal.

The album's sound was heavily inspired by Cult Leader's cover of "You Are Not My Blood" found on Useless Animal, originally by the indie/folk collaboration between Mark Kozelek and Desertshore from their eponymous 2013 album, Mark Kozelek & Desertshore. Vocalist Anthony Lucero sees himself as being "in the same vocal range" as musicians such as Tom Waits, Nick Cave and Michael Gira, and the fruitful sessions that resulted in "You Are Not My Blood" encouraged Cult Leader to incorporate more of these styling into their metallic punk sound. Lucero said Lightless Walk saw Cult Leader exploring how to write songs that incorporated these two textural elements to balance each other out. He elaborated: "There has to be some sort of silver lining existing somewhere in the world to counterbalance depression. And I tend to write about that a lot." Lyrically, Lightless Walk explores ideas of depression, isolation, sadness and hope.

== Track listing ==
No.	Title	Length
1.	"Great I Am"	1:23
2.	"The Sorrower"	2:33
3.	"Sympathetic"	4:04
4.	"Suffer Louder"	2:17
5.	"Broken Blades"	2:00
6.	"A Good Life"	5:16
7.	"Walking Wastelands"	1:53
8.	"Gutter Gods"	1:33
9.	"Hate Offering"	2:55
10.	"How Deep It Runs"	5:30
11.	"Lightless Walk"	7:18

== Personnel ==
Lightless Walk personnel adapted from CD liner notes.

=== Cult Leader ===
- Michael Mason
- Anthony Lucero
- Casey Hansen
- Sam Richards

=== Production ===
- Kurt Ballou – engineering, mixing
- Brad Boatright – mastering

=== Artwork and packaging ===
- Anthony Lucero – artwork
- Jacob Bannon – layout
