= Martyr Immortal =

Studio album by Pulling Teeth
- Released: November 27, 2007
- Recorded: August 2007
- Genre: Metalcore
- Length: 25:43
- Label: Deathwish (DWI67)

Pulling Teeth chronology
| Witches Sabbath Volume I (2007) | Martyr Immortal (2007) | Witches Sabbath Volume II (2007) |

Professional ratings
Review scores
| Source | Rating |
|---|---|
| Punknews.org | 4.5/5 stars |
| Sputnikmusic | 4/5 |

Martyr Immortal is the second studio album by the American hardcore band Pulling Teeth. The album was released on November 27, 2007 through Deathwish Inc.

== Track listing ==
1. "With Avarice" – 1:30
2. "Dead Is Dead" – 0:40
3. "Clipped Wings" – 1:23
4. "Stonethrowers" – 1:23
5. "Shiteaters" – 1:50
6. "Sick and Tired" – 2:22
7. "Rains" – 0:58
8. "Basically Dead" – 1:13
9. "Martyr Immortal (Mori VincentOmnes)" – 3:49
10. "Black Skies" – 2:56
11. "Ashes and Dust" – 0:22
12. "Dismissed in Time" – 7:17
