= Self Portrait (Loma Prieta album) =

Studio album by Loma Prieta
- Released: October 2, 2015
- Studios: Atomic Garden Recording Studio (Palo Alto, California)
- Genres: Screamo, powerviolence
- Length: 31:43
- Label: Deathwish (DW182)
- Producer: Jack Shirley

Loma Prieta chronology
Loma Prieta / Raein (2013)	Self Portrait (2015)

Singles from Self Portrait
- 1. "Love" Released: July 24, 2015

Self Portrait is the fifth studio album by the American hardcore punk band Loma Prieta. The Jack Shirley-produced album was released on CD, cassette and digital platforms by Deathwish Inc. on October 2, 2015, followed by a vinyl release on November 13 also by Deathwish. In a press release, Self Portrait was described as featuring "unorthodox melodies amid a tangle of pensive, despondent vocals" inspired by the California hardcore bands Funeral Diner and Mohinder, among others.

Loma Prieta promoted Self Portrait with a 7" single of the opening track "Love" backed with the exclusive B-side "Trilogy 0 (Debris)" released on July 24, 2015, by Deathwish. The band released a music video for "Love" on September 9, 2015, directed by Kyle Camarillo. Writing for Vice magazine's music blog Noisey, John Hill said the video perfectly represented the song's build up and that "the visual starts with the band in a black and white space devoid of anything but the band playing. As the song progresses, the vision of what they're doing intensifies and distorts itself to the point where you can't really understand what's going on. It's here where the song and its strength hits its total power, visually and sonically." Loma Prieta also helped promote Self Portrait with an online stream of the song "Never Remember".

== Track listing ==
No.	Title	Length
1.	"Love"	2:43
2.	"Black Square"	2:06
3.	"Roadside Cross"	1:52
4.	"Net Gain"	2:20
5.	"More Perfect"	4:39
6.	"Nostalgia"	4:43
7.	"Never Remember"	1:59
8.	"Merciless"	2:41
9.	"Rings"	2:33
10.	"Satellite"	6:07
Total length:		31:43
