= I.V. (Loma Prieta album) =

Studio album by Loma Prieta
- Released: January 17, 2012
- Recorded: June 2011
- Genre: Screamo, powerviolence
- Length: 24:03
- Label: Deathwish (DWI131)
- Producer: Jack Shirley

Loma Prieta chronology
Life/Less (2010)	I.V. (2012)	Loma Prieta / Raein (2013)

Professional ratings
Review scores
Source	Rating
AbsolutePunk	83%
Alternative Press	4/5 stars
Sputnikmusic	4.5/5 stars

I.V. is the fourth studio album by the American hardcore punk band Loma Prieta. It was released on January 17, 2012, by Deathwish Inc. I.V. was written during an "intense and emotional" period in the lives of the band members.

== Critical reception ==
Exclaim! called the album "a constantly shifting project, seamlessly weaving together melody, pummelling riffs, melancholic contemplation and an unmistakable Bay-area attitude," writing that the album "should be essential listening for anyone wondering what the future of hardcore is going to look like."

== Track listing ==
1. "Fly By Night" – 2:40
2. "Torn Portrait" – 1:31
3. "Reproductive" – 1:17
4. "Trilogy 4 'Momentary'" – 0:56
5. "Trilogy 5 'Half Cross'" – 1:21
6. "Trilogy 6 'Forgetting'" – 3:02
7. "Untitled" – 0:43
8. "Uniform" – 2:12
9. "Uselessness" – 2:20
10. "Aside From This Distant Shadow, There Is Nothing Left" – 2:10
11. "Biography" – 2:33
12. "Diamond Tooth" – 3:18
