= In Place Apart =

Studio album by Killing the Dream
- Released: September 13, 2005
- Genre: Hardcore punk
- Length: 25:31
- Label: Deathwish (DWI49)
- Producer: Kurt Ballou

Killing the Dream chronology
I Rewrote It (2005)	In Place Apart (2005)	Fractures (2008)

Professional ratings
Review scores
Source	Rating
Exclaim!	(positive)
Punknews.org	3/5 stars

In Place Apart is the debut studio album by the American hardcore band Killing the Dream. The album was released on September 13, 2005, through Deathwish Inc. In Place Apart was produced by Kurt Ballou and features artwork designed by Jacob Bannon—both of which also play in the hardcore band Converge.

In 2013, seven years after the album's release, Deathwish posted an unreleased track from In Place Apart online titled "Ambition Deficit." The song was originally intended to be an intro song, but was ultimately scrapped.

== Track listing ==
1. "Rough Draft (An Explanation)" – 1:49
2. "Critical Thought" – 1:25
3. "Post Script" – 1:49
4. "If It Rains" – 1:41
5. "Where the Heart Is" – 2:23
6. "We're All Dead Ends" – 3:22
7. "Ante Up" – 1:36
8. "Past the Stars" – 1:47
9. "Sick of Sleeping" – 2:31
10. "Writer's Block" – 1:05
11. "39th and Glisan" – 2:25
12. "Four Years Too Late" – 3:38

== Personnel ==
Killing the Dream

- Christopher Chase – bass guitar
- Isaac Fratini – drums
- Elijah Horner – vocals
- Bart Mullis – guitars

Production and artwork

- Kurt Ballou – engineer, mixing
- Jacob Bannon – design, illustrations
- Zack Ohren – vocal engineer
- Alex Garcia Rivera – drum technician
