= Black Eye Blues =

Studio album by Lewd Acts
- Released: September 1, 2009
- Recorded: January 2009
- Genre: Hardcore punk
- Length: 28:41
- Label: Deathwish (DWI93)
- Producer: Kurt Ballou

Lewd Acts chronology
Lung Patrol (2009)	Black Eye Blues (2009)

Professional ratings
Review scores
Source	Rating
Punknews.org	4/5 stars
RVA Magazine	(positive)

Black Eye Blues is the second studio album by the American hardcore band Lewd Acts. The album was released on September 1, 2009 through Deathwish Inc. Black Eye Blues was met with generally positive reviews. NME said the song "Night-Crawlers" is "a melodic welt to be worn proudly." The illustrations for Black Eye Blues were done by Tyler Densley, and the design and packaging were done by Jacob Bannon of Converge. The album was produced by Kurt Ballou also of Converge.

== Track listing ==
1. "Know Where to Go" – 1:37
2. "Wide Black Eyes" – 1:28
3. "Night-Crawlers" – 2:16
4. "You Don't Need Me" – 0:42
5. "I Don't Need You" – 3:22
6. "Who Knew the West Coast Could Be So Cold" – 1:24
7. "Penmanship Sailed" – 5:03
8. "Young Lovers, Old Livers" – 2:30
9. "Rot Gut Charlie" – 1:19
10. "My Father Was a Locomotive" – 2:56
11. "Nowhere to Go" – 6:03
