= Darkness Come Alive =

Studio album by Doomriders
- Released: September 29, 2009
- Genre: Sludge metal
- Length: 46:18
- Label: Deathwish (DWI95)

Doomriders chronology
Long Hair and Tights (2007)	Darkness Come Alive (2009)	Grand Blood (2013)

Darkness Come Alive is the second album from Boston, Massachusetts-based metal band Doomriders. It was released September 29, 2009 on the record label Deathwish Inc. The album is available as a CD, as a 12" vinyl LP, and via download.

== Reception ==
Professional ratings
Review scores
Source	Rating
Pitchfork	(7.5/10)

Darkness Come Alive was generally praised by reviewers. Shawn Bosler of Decibel magazine lauded the band's skilled songwriting, saying that "the stellar songwriting sounds like a well-honed band working together, stretching out the tunes and getting all ninja pyrotechnic on your ass." Nick Gergesha of hearwaxmedia.com called it "nothing less than pure sensory enlightenment", noting that the album was "crafted with the utmost respect for the listener".

== Track listing ==
1. "Fade from Black" – 0:58
2. "Heavy Lies the Crown" – 3:28
3. "Bear Witness" – 2:48
4. "Knife Wound" – 1:47
5. "Come Alive" – 5:05
6. "Night Howler" - 1:01
7. "Crooked Path" – 4:47
8. "Lions" – 4:46
9. "Equalizer" – 2:32
10. "Night Lurker" – 1:12
11. "Jealous God" – 4:41
12. "Mercy" – 3:06
13. "Night Beckons" – 0:16
14. "Blood Avenger" – 3:47
15. "Bloodsuckers" – 2:22
16. "-" – 0:26
17. "Rotter" – 3:08
