= Peace on Earth, War on Stage =

EP by Blacklisted
- Released: April 3, 2007
- Genre: Hardcore punk
- Length: 5:57
- Label: Deathwish (DWI58)

Blacklisted chronology
...The Beat Goes On (2005)	Peace on Earth, War on Stage (2007)	Heavier Than Heaven, Lonelier Than God (2008)

Peace on Earth, War on Stage is a 7" vinyl E.P. released by Philadelphia hardcore band Blacklisted on Deathwish Inc. It is available on multiple colors and has a total press of 3,000 to date.

== Track listing ==
1. "Ivory Tower" – 1:20
2. "Memory Layne" – 1:43
3. "Canonized" – 1:28
4. "Setting Sun" – 1:26
