= I Am Not What I Am =

Studio album by Young and in the Way
- Released: March 24, 2011
- Recorded: 2011
- Genre: Black metal, crust punk, hardcore punk
- Length: 27:58
- Label: Self released (2011), A389 Recordings (2012)

Young and in the Way chronology
I Am Not What I Am	When Life Comes to Death

I Am Not What I Am is the first full release from Young and in the Way. It was self-released on March 24, 2011. It was rereleased in 2012 with the bands Amen EP.

== Track listing ==
1. "That Is Not Dead Which Can Eternal Lie" - 5:54
2. "And We Have Killed Him" - 1:24
3. "Leaving Nothing but the Absence of Everything" - 2:00
4. "If Only That So Many Dead Lie Round" - 1:18
5. "Death Is Eager to Hold You" - 1:37
6. "They Should Greet Me With Howls of Execration" - 2:28
7. "With Strange Aeons Even Death May Die" - 1:18
8. "I Am Not What I Am" - 2:49
9. "Love and Terror Laid the Stone" - 1:54
10. "The Chaotic and Bloody World Around Us" - 1:57
11. "Ascending the White Mountain" - 5:19
