= Birds in Row / WAITC =

EP split by Birds in Row & WAITC
- Released: October 30, 2015
- Genre: Hardcore punk
- Length: 14:53
- Label: Throatruiner
- Producer: Amaury Sauve

Birds in Row chronology
Personal War (2015)	Birds in Row / WAITC (2015)	We Already Lost the World (2018)

WAITC chronology
Vinogradska (2013)	Birds in Row / WAITC (2015)

Birds in Row / WAITC is a split EP between the French punk bands Birds in Row and WAITC (formerly known as We Are in the Country). The EP was released on October 30, 2015 through the French label Throatruiner Records, with Deathwish Inc. handling wider distribution.

In September 2015, both bands released one track each for online streaming to promote the release—Birds in Row released "Can't Leave", while WAITC released "Empty Decade/Saturnism". In October 2015, Birds in Row released a music video for the track "Can't Lie" directed by Mr Fifi. The video intersperses various clips of Birds in Row performing live with footage of a busy Asian city.

== Track listing ==
=== Birds in Row ===
1. "Can't Leave" – 2:12
2. "Can't Lie" – 2:27
3. "Can't Love" – 2:27

=== WAITC ===
4. "Empty Decade/Saturnism" – 2:18
5. "Veiled Ax" – 1:46
6. "Empty Mailbox" – 3:43
