= When Life Comes to Death =

Studio album by Young and in the Way
- Released: May 27, 2014
- Genre: Black metal, crust punk
- Length: 46:23
- Label: Deathwish (DW159)

Young and in the Way chronology
V. Eternal Depression (2011)	When Life Comes to Death (2014)	Ride Off and Die (2020)

Professional ratings
Review scores
Source	Rating
Exclaim!	7/10
Pitchfork	5.5/10.0

When Life Comes to Death is the second studio album by the American black metal band Young and in the Way. The album was released on May 27, 2014 through Deathwish Inc. To promote the album, Young and in the Way released music videos for the songs "Be My Blood" and "Final Dose". When Life Comes to Death peaked a number 11 on the Billboard 200 Top Heatseekers chart. It's their last album prior to their 2018 breakup following allegations of sexual assault.

== Track listing ==
1. "Betrayed By Light" – 3:52
2. "Fuck This Life" – 3:28
3. "Be My Blood" – 2:53
4. "Self Inflicted" – 3:59
5. "Loved and Unwanted" – 2:39
6. "We Are Nothing" – 3:14
7. "Final Dose" – 2:44
8. "Weep In My Dust" – 3:46
9. "Take My Hand" – 4:26
10. "Shadow of Murder" – 5:37
11. "Embrace Extinction" – 9:45
