= Personal War =

EP by Birds in Row
- Released: 30 October 2015
- Genre: Hardcore punk; melodic hardcore
- Length: 17:33
- Label: Deathwish, Inc.
- Producer: Amaury Sauvé

Birds in Row chronology
| You, Me & the Violence (2012) | Personal War (2015) | Birds in Row / WAITC (2015) |

Personal War is an EP by French hardcore punk band Birds in Row. It was released on 30 October 2015 through Deathwish, Inc., simultaneously with their split album Birds in Row / WAITC. The songs on both releases were recorded in 2014 with producer Amaury Sauvé.

A music video for the track "Weary" was released on 20 September 2015. The band streamed the album online a day prior to its release.

== Critical reception ==
Professional ratings
Review scores
| Source | Rating |
|---|---|
| Exclaim! | 8/10 |

Exclaim! critic Branan Ranjanathan praised the EP, describing it as "a tumultuous, brooding and visceral ride that places Birds In Row amongst artists those pushing melodic hardcore forward."

== Track listing ==
1. "Intro" — 2:10
2. "Torches" — 2:49
3. "O'Dear" — 2:49
4. "Weary" — 1:43
5. "Worried" — 2:04
6. "Snakes" — 1:43
7. "Marathon" — 4:15

== Personnel ==
- Birds in Row – performance, composition
- Amaury Sauvé – production, mixing, recording
