= You, Me & the Violence =

Studio album by Birds in Row
- Released: September 4, 2012
- Genre: Hardcore punk; melodic hardcore
- Length: 35:40
- Label: Deathwish (DW137)
- Producer: A. Sauve; S. Biguet

Birds in Row chronology
Collected (2012)	You, Me & the Violence (2012)	Personal War (2015)

You, Me & the Violence is the debut studio album by French hardcore punk band Birds in Row. It was released on September 4, 2012 through Deathwish Inc. A music video for the lead track "Pilori" was released in June 2012. Musically, the album features a screamo-influenced melodic hardcore sound.

== Critical reception ==
Professional ratings
Review scores
Source	Rating
AbsolutePunk	89%
Exclaim!	(positive)

AbsolutePunk critic Dre Okorley wrote: "The reigning allure of the twelve tracks is that they are peppered with a sort of Tragedy/From Ashes Rise hybrid, the throat-pulling melodic hardcore that Portland trademarked so well, but are still captured in the Birds In Row mystique." Okorley also concluded that the album "is in a league of its own, with hardly anything in its associated genres to be bullied by and rivaled." Exclaim!'s Bradley Zorgdrager stated: "The record ends on a high note, as "Lovers Have Their Say" swells, but never fully climaxes, giving listeners a chance to reflect on the masterpiece they just took in as the feedback takes over."

== Track listing ==
All songs composed by Birds in Row.

1. "Pilori" – 2:27
2. "There Is Only One Chair in This Room" – 2:16
3. "Cages" – 1:02
4. "Guillotine" – 1:43
5. "Walter Freeman" – 3:23
6. "Last Last Chance" – 2:34
7. "You, Me & the Violence" – 2:59
8. "Grey Hair" – 1:23
9. "Cold War Everyday" – 1:08
10. "The Illusionist" – 1:50
11. "Police & Thieves" – 2:03
12. "Lovers Have Their Say" – 12:52

== Personnel ==
You, Me & the Violence personnel adapted from CD liner notes.

- A. Sauve – recording, production
- S. Biguet – recording, production, mixing
- A. Douches – mastering
