= No One Deserves to Be Here More Than Me =

Studio album by Blacklisted
- Released: December 1, 2009
- Genre: Hardcore punk, experimental rock, grunge
- Length: 34:41
- Label: Deathwish (DWI100)

Blacklisted chronology
Heavier Than Heaven, Lonelier Than God (2008)	No One Deserves to Be Here More Than Me (2009)	When People Grow, People Go (2015)

Professional ratings
Review scores
Source	Rating
Scenepointblank.com	9.5/10 link
Punknews.com	4/5 link
Asice.net	4.5/5 link

No One Deserves to Be Here More Than Me is a full-length LP released by Philadelphia hardcore band Blacklisted on Deathwish Inc. on December 1, 2009. Initially, the record was released only on vinyl that came packaged with a download card. The LP was announced the day of its release on the Deathwish E-Store. The CD version includes three bonus tracks that can also be found on the band's Eccentrichine EP.

== Track listing ==
All tracks by Blacklisted

No.	Title	Length
1.	"Our Apartment Is Always Empty"	4:37
2.	"Everything In My Life Is For Sale"	1:49
3.	"J.M.N. (Interlude)"	0:51
4.	"No One Deserves To Be Here More Than Me"	2:40
5.	"G.E.H. (Interlude)"	0:54
6.	"The P.I.G. (Problem Is G.)"	1:56
7.	"I’m Trying To Disappear"	3:49
8.	"Palisade"	1:44
9.	"Skeletons"	2:58
10.	"I Am Extraordinary"	3:57
11.	"S.M.F. (Interlude)"	1:30
12.	"Stones Throw"	3:58
13.	"D.J.W. (Interlude)"	0:30
14.	"Eccentrichine"	3:28

== Personnel ==
- Will Yip – Engineer
- Will Yip – Mastering, Mixing
- Violin by Josh Agran on “Our Apartment Is Always Empty”
- Trumpet by Oskar Kalinowski on “G.E.H.”
- Trumpet by Oskar Kalinowski and Colin McGinnis on “I’m Trying To Disappear”
- Rainstick by David Walling on “I Am Extraordinary”
- Additional vocals by Melissa Farley on “I Am Extraordinary”
