= Lucky Me (album) =

Studio album by Killing the Dream
- Released: November 22, 2010
- Genre: Hardcore punk, melodic hardcore
- Length: 19:05
- Label: Deathwish (DWI111)
- Producer: Pat Hills, Zack Ohren

Killing the Dream chronology
Fractures (2008)	Lucky Me (2010)

Professional ratings
Review scores
Source	Rating
Decibel	(7/10)
Exclaim!	(positive)
Punknews.org	3.5/5 stars

Lucky Me is the third and final studio album by the American hardcore punk band Killing the Dream. The album was released on November 22, 2010, through Deathwish Inc.

The title of the album is said to be "sarcastic in a sense, but is really genuine in another" by vocalist Elijah Horner, who saw himself as lucky to be where he was in his life during the recording of Lucky Me.

== Track listing ==
All songs composed by Elijah Horner, except where noted.

1. "Blame the Architects" – 3:27
2. "Walking, Diseased" – 2:37
3. "Testimony" (Kurt Travis) – 3:07
4. "Past of a Saint (We Were Thieves)" – 2:35
5. "Part IV: Sinner's Future" – 1:17
6. "Hell Can Wait" (Larrah Feliciano, Horner) – 2:13
7. "Black" (Horner, Chad Roberts) – 3:49

== Personnel ==
Killing the Dream

- Chris Chase – bass
- Isaac Fratini – drums
- Pat Guild – guitar
- Elijah Horner – vocals, lyrics
- D.J. Rogers – guitar

Additional musicians

- Larrah Feliciano – composing, lyrics
- Chad Roberts (Havilland) – composing, lyrics
- Anna Stosich – violin
- Kurt Travis (ex-Dance Gavin Dance, ex-A Lot Like Birds) – vocals

Recording and packaging

- Jacob Bannon (Converge) – artwork, design
- Pat Hills – production
- Zack Ohren – production
