= ...The Beat Goes On =

Studio album by Blacklisted
- Released: August 8, 2005
- Genre: Hardcore punk
- Length: 23:27
- Label: Deathwish (DWI48)

Blacklisted chronology
We're Unstoppable (2005)	...The Beat Goes On (2005)	Peace on Earth, War on Stage (2007)

...The Beat Goes On is the first full-length album by the Philadelphia hardcore band Blacklisted.

== Track listing ==
No.	Title	Length
1.	"Tourist"	1:02
2.	"Wolves At My Door"	1:58
3.	"Bruising Serenade"	1:16
4.	"I Refuse"	2:38
5.	"Life Moves On"	1:44
6.	"What's Wrong With George?"	1:37
7.	"Old Friend"	1:54
8.	"Brightest Son"	0:47
9.	"How Quickly We Forget (Again)"	2:22
10.	"Do You Feel?"	1:16
11.	"Coming Clean"	0:47
12.	"Good Grief"	2:04
13.	"Mother Teresa"	4:02
Total length:		23:27
