= In the Eyes of the Lord =

Debut metalcore album

Studio album by 100 Demons
- Released: October 17, 2000
- Genre: Metalcore
- Length: 28:23
- Label: Good Life Recordings
- Producer: Chris "Zeuss" Harris

100 Demons chronology
| In the Eyes of the Lord (2000) | 100 Demons (2004) |

Professional ratings
Review scores
| Source | Rating |
|---|---|
| Allmusic | link |

In the Eyes of the Lord is 100 Demons' first album. Produced by Chris "Zeuss" Harris and released under the label Good Life Recordings. Drawing inspiration from Japanese aesthetics and Agnostic beliefs, In The Eyes of the Lord is a metalcore album. This album compared to its successor; 100 Demons (album) is more of a lo-fi album than what the band would have had eventually evolved into.

Some re-releases of In the Eyes of the Lord contain bonus tracks, with various demos and unreleased tracks. The re-releases are also remastered versions of the original 2000 release. Titles of tracks include Straight to Hell and Cast in Blood .

== Track listing ==
| No. | Title | Length |
|---|---|---|
| 1. | "Forsaken" | 2:43 |
| 2. | "Suffer" | 2:53 |
| 3. | "So Alone" | 2:19 |
| 4. | "Wake Up and Hate" | 2:07 |
| 5. | "While You're Praying" | 3:02 |
| 6. | "Infected" | 2:34 |
| 7. | "How Can I Regret" | 2:00 |
| 8. | "Hard Luck" | 2:34 |
| 9. | "Back Lash" | 2:31 |
| 10. | "Hard Surprise" | 2:14 |
| 11. | "Broke" | 3:26 |
