= When People Grow, People Go =

Studio album by Blacklisted
- Released: February 10, 2015
- Genre: Hardcore punk
- Length: 20:19
- Label: Deathwish (DW169)
- Producer: Will Yip

Blacklisted chronology
So, You Are A Magician? (2012)	When People Grow, People Go (2015)

When People Grow, People Go is the fourth and final studio album by American hardcore punk band Blacklisted. The album was released on February 10, 2015 through Deathwish Inc. When People Grow, People Go is the first release from Blacklisted since 2012's So, You Are A Magician? EP, and first full-length studio album since 2009's No One Deserves to Be Here More Than Me. Writing for the album began in late 2013 and sonically is described as being a mix of the band's more experimental styles and hardcore styles. In December 2014, Blacklisted previewed the track "Deeper Kind" for online streaming followed by a stream of "Burnt Palms" and a music video for "Turn in the Pike" both in January 2015.

== Track listing ==
No.	Title	Length
1.	"Insularized"	1:56
2.	"Turn in the Pike"	1:36
3.	"Riptide"	2:00
4.	"Deeper Kind"	1:20
5.	"Gossamer"	1:50
6.	"Burnt Palms"	1:51
7.	"Foreign Observer"	2:13
8.	"Calendars"	0:56
9.	"Wooder Ice"	1:48
10.	"Bottle Rockets"	1:16
11.	"When People Grow, People Go"	3:32
