= Paranoid Delusions/Paradise Illusions =

- The "nightmarish" version of the cover art.

Studio album by Pulling Teeth
- Released: March 31, 2009
- Recorded: October 2008 – January 2009
- Genre: Hardcore punk Sludge Metal
- Length: 23:30
- Label: Deathwish (DWI082)

Pulling Teeth chronology
| Witches Sabbath Volume IV (2008) | Paranoid Delusions/Paradise Illusions (2009) | Witches Sabbath Volume V (2009) |

Professional ratings
Review scores
| Source | Rating |
|---|---|
| Exclaim! | (positive) |
| Punknews.org | 4/5 stars |
| Sputnikmusic | 4/5 |

Paranoid Delusions/Paradise Illusions is the third studio album by the American rock band Pulling Teeth. The album was released on March 31, 2009 through Deathwish Inc. The cover art for the vinyl edition of Paranoid Delusions/Paradise Illusions features a lenticular image that shifts from "a serene, forested landscape populated solely by a languishing maiden" to a "nightmarish, zombiefied nuclear scenario," Jay DiNitto of Noisecreep said.

== Track listing ==
1. "Ritual" – 4:42
2. "Unsatisfied" – 2:36
3. "Bloodwolves" – 2:51
4. "Paranoid Delusions" – 3:55
5. "Paradise Illusions" – 9:26
