= Birds in Row =

French hardcore punk band

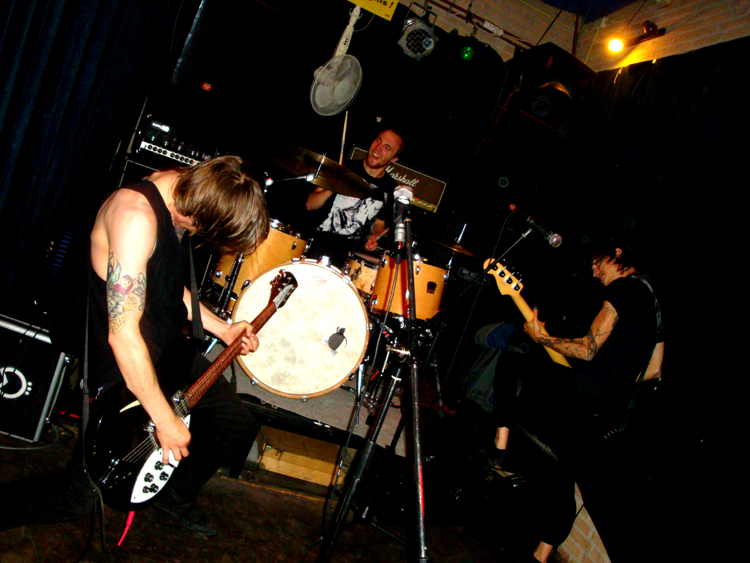
- Birds in Row performing live in April 2011

Background information
- Origin: Laval, Mayenne, France
- Genres: Post-hardcore; screamo; melodic hardcore
- Years active: 2009–present
- Labels: Deathwish; Vitriol
- Members: B.; J.; Q.
- Past members: D.; T.
- Website: wearebirdsinrow.com

Birds in Row is a French hardcore punk band that formed in 2009 in Laval and is composed of three members, "T.", "Q." and "B.". They signed to Deathwish Inc. in 2011 and released their debut album You, Me & the Violence in 2012.

== History ==
Birds in Row formed in Laval, Mayenne in 2009. Two of the members formed Birds in Row one week after their previous band split up, and recorded their first song one week later. The group chose the name because birds are able to fly around freely, however, "they very often decide to fly as a group or land on wires in a row. So, this for us represents how people could chose to be free, but always end up following their fellows to feel comfortable." They chose the name 'Birds in Row' over 'Birds in a Row' because it sounded better to the group. They also chose to sing in English because they, "wanted to be understood by most of the people." The biggest influence at this time was Modern Life Is War.

The band's earliest releases include 2009's Rise of the Phoenix and 2010's Cottbus, two EPs released through Vitriol Records. Birds in Row had begun writing their debut album in late 2011. Deathwish Inc. showed interest in reissuing their Cottbus EP, but the band offered the album they had been working on the time instead. Birds in Row's signing was announced in November 2011, and they finished recording their debut album by January 2012. Also in January 2012, Vitriol reissued the group's early EPs as a compilation titled Collected.

Birds in Row toured the United States with Loma Prieta in March 2012 and with Touché Amoré, Defeater and Code Orange Kids in April 2013. A music video for the song "Pilori" was released in June 2012, and Birds in Row's debut album You, Me & the Violence was released on September 4, 2012. Also in 2012, the band toured Europe with Converge and Rise and Fall in August, and the UK in December. In July 2013 they appeared at Fluff Fest in the Czech Republic for the first time, returning in 2015 and 2017. Along with Glass Cloud and Rebuker, Birds in Row opened for the Chariot during their final tour in October/November 2013.

In 2014, the Birds in Row posted a Facebook update explaining that the band had broken up, only to delete the post shortly after leading to confusion about the state of the band. They released a follow-up statement that explained Birds in Row was going through some changes and had not broken up. Birds in Row later elaborated that the band was going through a "pretty brutal" line-up change. Citing both an interest in learning to perform together with the new line-up and wanting to pay tribute to the people and labels who helped them achieve their level of success, the band decided to release a series of EPs and split releases in lieu of full-length follow-up to You, Me & the Violence., followed by the EP Personal War released through Deathwish and a split release with WAITC — who are also from Laval, France — to be released through the French label Throatruiner Records. According to the band, their lyrics deal with the "relationship[s] with people and how taking certain choices will affect your relationship with friends or people outside".

The band released its second full-length studio album titled We Already Lost the World through Deathwish on July 13, 2018. Coinciding with the album's official announcement in May 2018, the band released a lyric video for the track "15-38" online. Fred Pessaro of Revolver noted the track was a departure from the band's earlier material and that it was a "slow-burn emotional offering that grows deeper and darker as it progresses, eventually opening back up into the brand of heaviosity [sic] that the trio is most associated with."

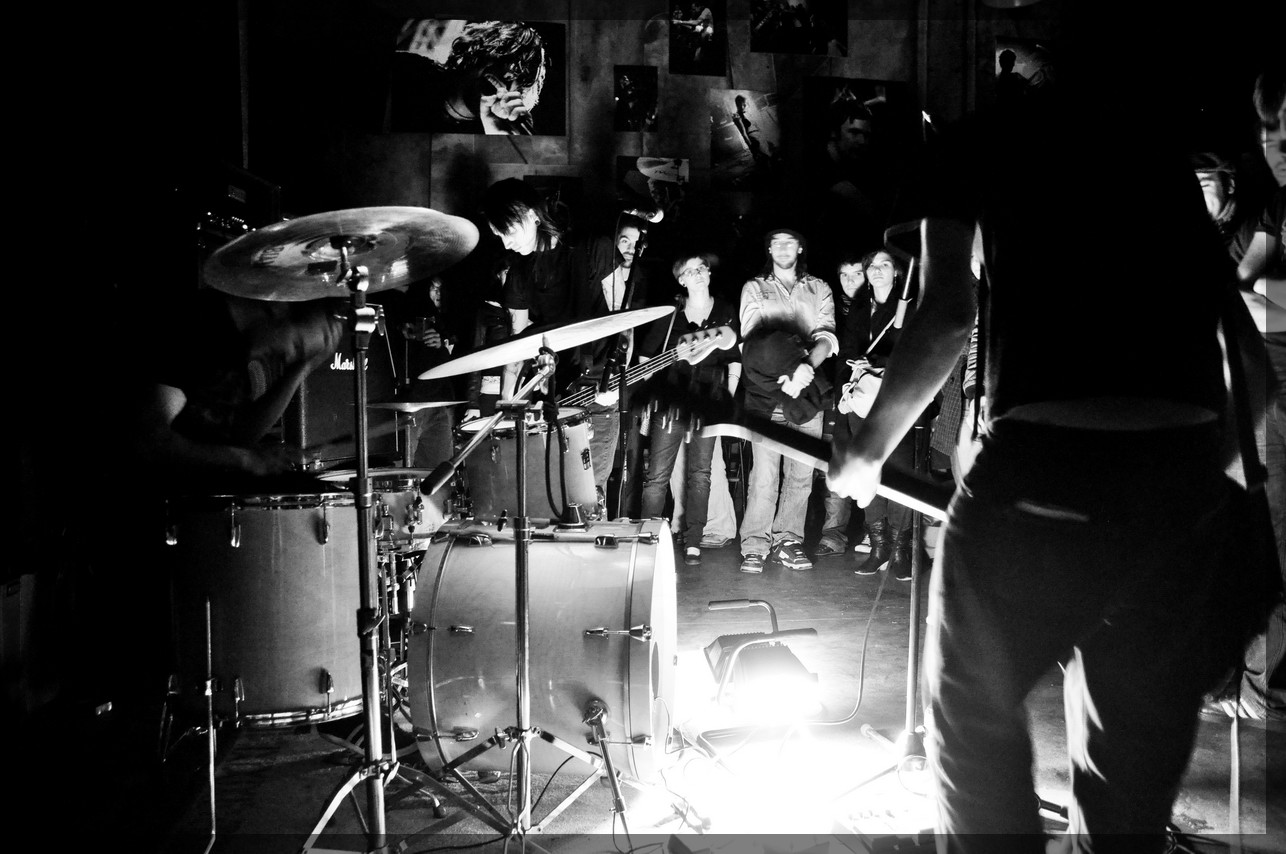
Birds in Row concert in January 2010

== Members and identity ==
Birds in Row is a three-piece band with a guitarist/vocalist, a bassist and a drummer. The faces of the members are intentionally cropped out of promotional photographs and music videos, and the original individual members were usually only referred to by the single letter initials: B, D or T. Birds in Row consciously make this effort in order to appear as a single entity rather than three individuals. The band commented, "It's not about some individuals, but songs, ideas, points of view that our three lives have in common. So as we've been asked for promo pics for several reasons, we decided to crop them so all you can see is a band." In 2014, the band went through a lineup change and D was replaced by Q.

Current Members

- Bart "B." Hirigoyen - vocals, guitar (2009–present)
- Quentin "Q" Sauvé - bass, vocals (2014–present)

== Discography ==
=== Studio albums ===
- You, Me & the Violence (2012, Deathwish)
- We Already Lost the World (2018, Deathwish)
- Gris Klein (2022, Red Creek)

=== Compilations ===
- Collected (2012, Vitriol)

=== EPs ===
- Rise of the Phoenix (2009, Vitriol)
- Cottbus (2010, Vitriol)
- Personal War (2015, Deathwish)
- Birds in Row / WAITC (split with WAITC) (2015, Throatruiner)

=== Music videos ===
- "Pilori" (2012, directed by Mr. Fifi)
- "Weary" (2015, directed by Florian Renault)
- "Can't Lie" (2015, directed by Mr. Fifi)
- "I Don't Dance" (2018, directed by Craig Murray)
