= Heavier Than Heaven, Lonelier Than God =

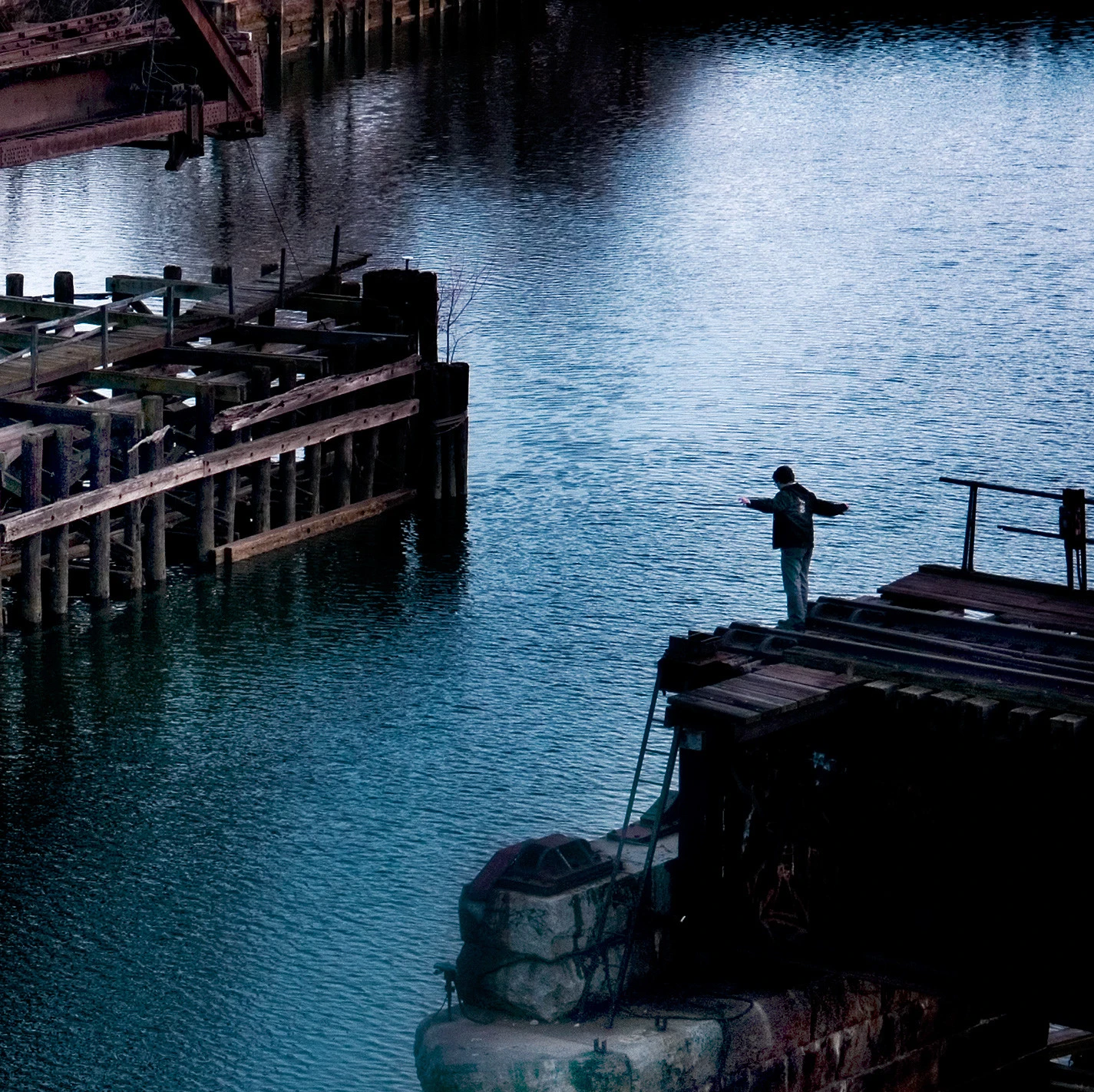

Studio album by Blacklisted
- Released: April 1, 2008
- Genre: Hardcore punk
- Length: 19:37
- Label: Deathwish (DWI70)

Blacklisted chronology
Peace on Earth, War on Stage (2007)	Heavier Than Heaven, Lonelier Than God (2008)	No One Deserves to Be Here More Than Me (2009)

Professional ratings
Review scores
Source	Rating
AbsolutePunk.net	(84%) link

Heavier Than Heaven, Lonelier Than God is the second full-length album by Philadelphia hardcore band Blacklisted, released through Deathwish Inc. on April 1, 2008, in both CD and 12" vinyl format. Blacklisted worked with producer Kurt Ballou on this album.

== Track listing ==
No.	Title	Length
1.	"Stations"	1:22
2.	"Touch Test"	1:16
3.	"I Am Weighing Me Down"	1:43
4.	"Always"	0:50
5.	"Memory Layne"	2:19
6.	"Circuit Breaker"	4:13
7.	"Matrimony"	1:05
8.	"Self Explosive"	1:07
9.	"Burning Monk"	0:49
10.	"Canonized"	1:29
11.	"Wish"	3:24
Total length:		19:37

== Personnel ==
- Kurt Ballou – engineer
- Alan Douches – mastering
- Alex Garcia Rivera – drum technician
