= Horizoner =

Studio album by Bloodhorse
- Released: May 26, 2009
- Genre: Stoner rock, Doom metal, Sludge metal
- Label: Translation Loss

Professional ratings
Review scores
Source	Rating
Allmusic	4/5 stars
Rock Sound	7/10 stars
Lambgoat	8/10 stars

Horizoner is the debut studio album by American metal band Bloodhorse.

== Track listing ==
1. "A Good Son" - 9:55
2. "A Passing Thought to the Contrary" - 4:29
3. "The Old Man" - 6:58
4. "Nonhossono" - 4:32
5. "Close, But Never So" - 2:53
6. "Aphoristic" - 2:38
7. "Morning Burial" - 7:26
8. "Paranoiac" - 3:46
9. "In Horror" - 6:49
