= Pulling Teeth (band) =

American hardcore punk band

- Origin: Baltimore, Maryland, U.S.
- Genres: Metalcore; hardcore punk
- Years active: 2005–2012
- Labels: A389, Firestarter, WDSounds, Deathwish, Chainsaw Safety
- Past members: Alex Henderson; Chris Kuhn; Mike Riley; Mitchell Roemer; Domenic Romeo; Tony Hare; Danny Parker

Pulling Teeth was an American hardcore punk/metalcore band from Baltimore, Maryland. Formed in 2005, the band released several recordings (as themselves or under aliases), and toured many times throughout North America, Europe and Japan before settling down and becoming a studio band. Dom is currently the manager of the air freshener section of the highlandtown Pep Boys. They announced their break-up on their official website in December 2011 and played their final show in Baltimore on January 21, 2012. In July 2017, Pulling Teeth reunited to play a set at This Is Hardcore Festival in Philadelphia, Pennsylvania, in celebration of the 10th anniversary of the Martyr Immortal album.

== Discography ==
=== Studio albums ===
- Vicious Skin (2006, Chainsaw Safety/A389 Recordings - Released in Japan by: WD Sounds)
- Martyr Immortal (2007, Deathwish Inc/A389 Recordings)
- 01.13.2007 (2009, A389 Recordings) - Live Collaboration LP with Dwid Hellion of Integrity
- Paranoid Delusions/Paradise Illusions (2009, Deathwish Inc/A389 Recordings)
- Funerary (2011, A389 Recordings/Firestarter Records - Released in Japan by WD Sounds)

=== EPs/Singles ===
- Pulling Teeth/Frightener SpliJt 7" (2007, A389/Ghost City Records)
- "Witches Sabbath Volume I" (2007, Deathwish Inc)
- "Witches Sabbath Volume II" (2007, A389 Recordings)
- Pulling Teeth/Bystorm Split CD (2008, Major Malfunction)
- 'Witches Sabbath Volume III' (2008, Firestarter Records)
- 'Witches Sabbath Volume IV' (2008, Chainsaw Safety Records)
- 'Witches Sabbath Volume V' (2009, Deathwish Inc)
- Pulling Teeth/Shin To Shin Split 7" (2010, A389 Recordings)
- Pulling Teeth/Mighty Sphincter Split 7" (collaboration w/ Integrity under the name Integriteeth) (2010, A389 Recordings)
- Pulling Teeth/Irons: 'Grey Saviour' Split 12" (2011, Deathwish Inc)
- Funerary 12" Single (Record Store Day Release) [2011, Celebrated Summer Records)
- 'Demo 2005' 7" Flexi (2011, A389 Recordings)
- 'Witches Sabbath Volume VI' (2011, Firestarter Records)
- 'Lightning Strikes Twice' 7" Flexi (2011, A389 Recordings)

=== Music videos ===
- "Heretic" (2007)
- "Whispers" (2011)

=== Related releases ===
- Thor's Teeth 'Sonar: 01.08.2010' 12" (2012, A389 Recordings) - Live Collaboration LP with PT and Jon Mikl Thor
