= Young and in the Way =

American blackened crust band

- Origin: Charlotte, North Carolina, United States
- Genres: Blackened crust
- Years active: 2009–2018
- Labels: Deathwish Inc.; Antithetic; A389
- Past members: Kable Lyall; Rick Contes; Randy Baucom; Chris Nolen; Max Nattsblod; Derrick Gause
- Website: yaitw.com

Young and in the Way was a blackened crust band from Charlotte, North Carolina, formed in 2009. Their music was described as "cold, hard and loud." They were formerly signed to Deathwish Inc.

== History ==
Since forming in 2009 the band have released both independently and through Antithetic Records, Headfirst Records and A389 Recordings. The band confirmed via their Facebook page that their new album When Life Comes to Death would be released worldwide by Deathwish Inc. in 2014.

In February 2018, a member of Young and in the Way was accused of multiple allegations of sexual assault. The alleged crimes were first brought to light by the Detroit, Michigan venue Trumbullplex, citing three incidents dating back to mid-2014. This revelation resulted in the band being pulled from a few then-upcoming music festivals and also being dropped by their label Deathwish, before ultimately disbanding. In response to allegations, the band stated that they did not support what happened to the victims and denied any involvement, but chose to break up because they could not provide evidence to prove their innocence. In part of a social media post, the Young and in the Way stated: "We stand by what we said when we learned about this incident – no member of our band was responsible for this crime. Let us be very clear – our response to this accusation is not an attempt to discredit the victim, we believe her, we’re sorry this happened to her, and we support her. But it was not us."

Despite their breakup in 2018, Young and in the Way released a final album in November 2020 titled Ride Off and Die. It was originally leaked shortly after their breakup in 2018.

== Band members ==
Final lineup

- Kable Lyall – vocals (2009–2018)
- Randy Baucom – drums (2009–2018)
- Rick Contes – guitar (2009–2018)
- Chris Nolen – bass (2009–2018)
- Derrick Gause - bass (live) (2013–2017)

Previous members

- Max Nattsblod (2016) – guitar (2013-2017)
- Dustin Carpenter - bass (substituted 2016-2017)

== Discography ==
=== Studio albums ===
- I Am Not What I Am (2011)
- When Life Comes to Death (2014)
- Ride Off and Die (2020)

=== EPs ===
- Newborn (2009)
- Amen (2010)
- Cloven Hoof (2010)
- V. Eternal Depression (2011)

=== Splits ===
- Split 7" w/ Torch Runner (2011)
- Split 7" w/ Moral Void (2013)
- Split 7" w/ Withdrawal (2013)
- Split 7" w/ Gatecreeper (2016)

=== Music videos ===
- "Times Are Cold" (2011)
- "The Gathering" (2012)
- "Be My Blood" (2014)
- "Final Dose" (2014)
