= Breather Resist =

- Origin: Louisville, Kentucky, U.S.
- Genres: Hardcore punk, mathcore
- Years active: 2002–2006
- Labels: Initial Records; Deathwish Inc. Jade Tree Records
- Members: Evan Patterson; Nick Thieneman; Geoff Paton; Steven Sindoni

Breather Resist was an American hardcore punk and mathcore band from Louisville, Kentucky, formed in 2002 and dissolved in 2006. They take their name from the song “Breather Resist” by Hoover.

== History ==
Breather Resist formed in 2002 and recorded 8 songs, 4 of which were on handmade demos. These 8 songs became their first EP, "Only in the Morning", released on Deathwish, Inc. Their first LP, Charmer, was released on Jade Tree Records in October 2004, having been produced by Kurt Ballou. In December 2005, lead singer Steve Sidoni left the group; guitarist Evan Patterson and bassist Nick Thieneman assumed the vocal duties. They entered the studio in early 2006 but found their sound had changed significantly, thus, changed the name from Breather Resist to Young Widows.

== Members ==
- Evan Patterson - Guitar (Young Widows, Black Cross, The National Acrobat)
- Nick Thieneman - Bass (Young Widows, Brain Banger, Black Cross, Black God)
- Geoff Paton - Drums (Young Widows, Trophy Wives)
- Steve Sindoni - Vocals (Pusher, Bowels, Shadow Snakes)

== Discography ==
- Only in the Morning (EP) (Deathwish Inc., 2003)
- The Second Half 7" (Initial Records, 2003)
- Patent Cruciform Casket 6” Shaped Picture Disc (King Of The Monsters Records, 2003)
- Charmer (Jade Tree Records, 2004)
- Breather Resist / Suicide Note (12” Split with Suicide Note) (Hawthorne St. Records, 2004)
- Breather Resist / Harkonen (Split 7” with Harkonen) (Happy Couples Never Last, 2004)
- Split Session (CD EP) (Nova Recordings, 2004)
- Full Of Tongues 7" (Auxiliary Records, 2005)
