= Greet Death =

American rock band

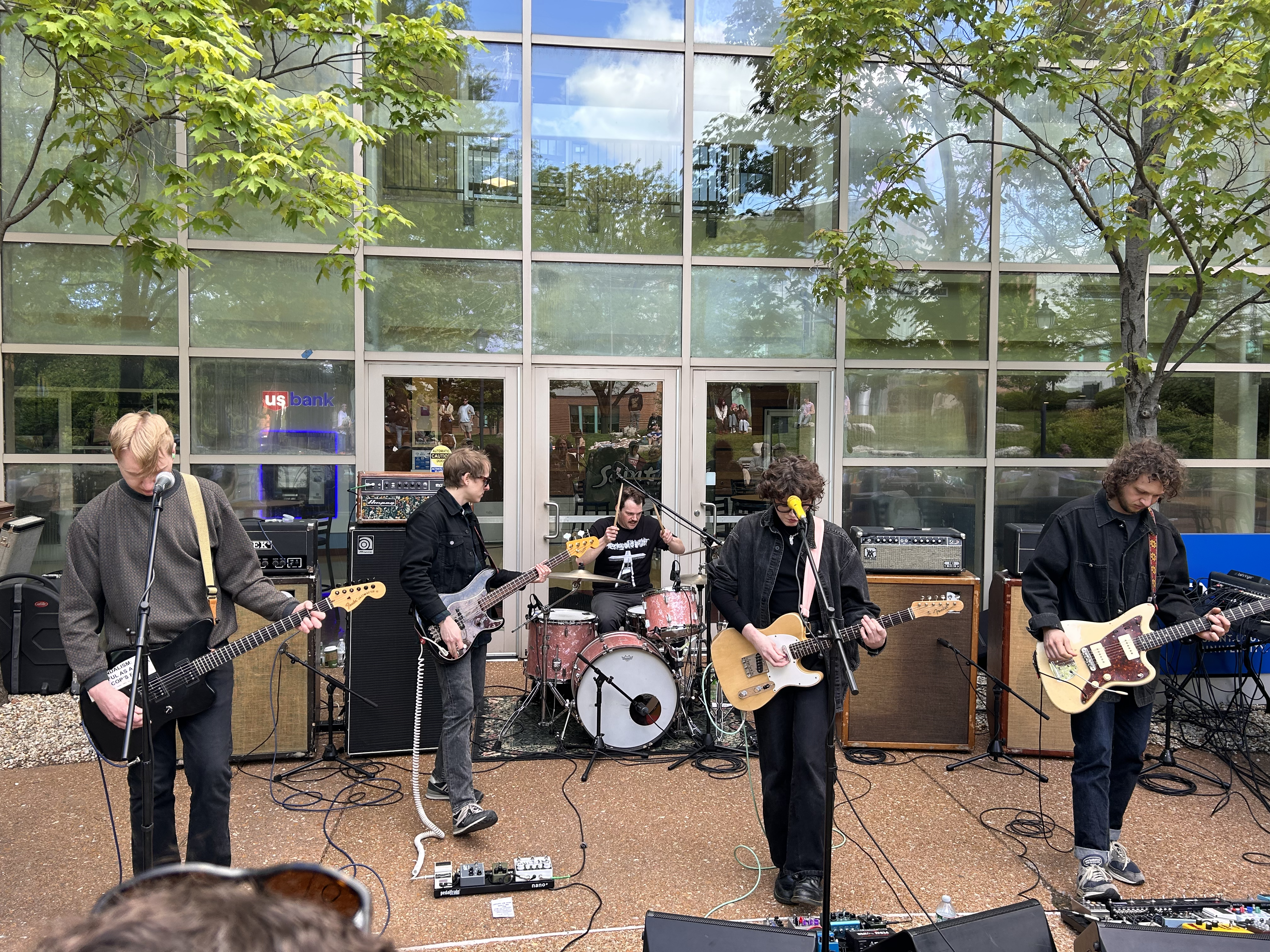
- Greet Death performs live at Saint Louis University on May 2, 2026.

Background information
- Origin: Flint, Michigan, U.S.
- Genres: Shoegaze; indie rock; slowcore
- Years active: 2011–present
- Labels: Deathwish Inc., Flesh and Bone
- Members: Harper Boyhtari; Logan Gaval; Jimmy Versluis; Seth Beck; Eric Beck
- Past members: Anthony Spak; Jackie Kalmink

Greet Death is an American rock band from Flint, Michigan. Greet Death has released three full-length albums.

== History ==
Greet Death's earliest influences included Cloakroom, True Widow and Nothing. They released their first full-length album in 2017 titled Dixieland. The album was released through Flesh and Bone Records. The band was featured as one of Alternative Press's "10 up-and-coming artists from Detroit you need to know". In 2019, Greet Death released their second full-length album titled New Hell, also through Deathwish Inc. They released a new EP, New Low, on June 24, 2022. Their third full-length album, Die In Love, was released on June 27, 2025.

== Side projects ==
In 2025, Harper Boyhtari and Seth Beck formed the band Christian Science Reading Room, together with Bristletongue members L Morgan and Andrew Smith. They released their first EP, Under the Bed and in the Eyes of Another, on October 6.

== Band members ==
- Logan Gaval – vocals, guitar
- Harper Boyhtari – vocals, guitar
- Jim Versluis – drums
- Seth Beck – bass
- Eric Beck – guitar

Former members

- Anthony Spak – drums
- Jackie Kalmink – bass

== Discography ==
=== Studio albums ===
- Dixieland (2017, Flesh and Bone)
- New Hell (2019, Deathwish Inc.)
- Die In Love (2025, Deathwish Inc.)

=== EPs ===
- In Heaven//Your Lull (2016, Flesh and Bone)
- New Low (2022, Deathwish Inc.)
