= Carpathian (band) =

Australian hardcore band

- Origin: Melbourne, Victoria, Australia
- Genres: Post-hardcore, hardcore punk, metalcore, melodic hardcore
- Years active: 2003–2011
- Labels: Resist Records, Deathwish Inc, Golf, Dead Souls Records.
- Members: Martin Kirby; Josh Manitta; Ed Redclift; David "Skan" Bichard; Lloyd Carroll
- Past members: Michael Crafter; Anthony Harris; Julian Marsh; Chris Farmer; Ben Coyte

Carpathian were an Australian hardcore band formed in Melbourne in 2003. The band disbanded in 2011, with its final line-up comprising vocalist Martin Kirby, guitarists Josh Manitta and Lloyd Carroll, bass guitarist Ed Redcliff and drummer David "Skan" Bichard. Carpathian was made up of both straight edge and non-straight edge members.

The band started out as a metalcore band, but by the time of their second album Isolation, moved into melodic hardcore territory. Isolation was their highest-charting release, reaching No. 19 on the ARIA Charts. Legendary UK post-punk band Joy Division influenced their late career work, as evidenced by the band using two Joy Division songs as track titles on Isolation ("Isolation" and "Ceremony"), and the band's cover of Joy Division's "Shadowplay" on the Wanderlust 7". The name of Kirby's label, Dead Souls Records, also references the title of another Joy Division song.

Carpathian's line-up changed numerous times over the band's history. Guitarists Anthony Harris and Julian Marsh left the band in short succession in late 2006, both leaving due to the band's heavy touring schedule. Former I Killed The Prom Queen vocalist Michael Crafter joined Carpathian in the same year and Kirby moved to guitar. However, Crafter left seven months later in February 2007 and Kirby returned to vocal duties. Former Day of Contempt vocalist Ben Coyte also played guitar in Carpathian from 2006 to 2007. Throughout the multiple lineup changes, Kirby continued to write all the band's lyrics and the majority of the music.

Carpathian played at festivals such as the 2007 Taste of Chaos and the 2008 Soundwave festival in Australia, as well as Sucks N Summer, Ieperfest Winter, Ieperfest Summer and Fluff Fest. Carpathian's final show was at The Arthouse in April 2011 and was part of the final week of The Arthouse shows before the venue closed.

In 2009 Kirby started Dead Souls Records, both as an artistic outlet and as a means to promote Australian hardcore bands. The label's roster included Carpathian, Shipwreck AD (US), Down To Nothing (US), The Broderick, The Hollow, AYS (Germany), Ghost Town and Iron Mind.

== History ==
Carpathian toured widely across Australia and internationally, playing alongside bands such as Atreyu, Have Heart, Comeback Kid, Verse, Against, Bleeding Through, Against Me!, As I Lay Dying, Killswitch Engage, Parkway Drive, Thursday and Alexisonfire.

In 2006, after the release of Nothing To Lose, they toured in the UK and Europe with Parkway Drive and On Broken Wings.

Carpathian completed their 'Isolation' tour across Australia in 2008, before another tour across Australia with Boston band and labelmates Shipwreck A.D. later that year.

The band's second tour of the European continent was in November 2008 alongside Have Heart and Cruel Hand.

=== 2009 ===
In early January, the band headlined the Boys of Summer Tour with Comeback Kid, Verse and Against.

In late January, Carpathian played a short run of shows in Japan with Death Before Dishonor, Trash Talk and Parkway Drive. They supported Have Heart's Australian tour in May (Excluding WA and QLD) followed by a string of dates with The Hollow around Australia.

In July, Carpathian played a handful of dates in Malaysia, Indonesia and Singapore followed by a full headline European and UK tour with German band Ritual and Swedish band Anchor.

=== 2010 ===
Carpathian embarked on a short Australian and South-East Asian tour to support the then upcoming Wanderlust 7" release. This tour was followed with a headline European tour with the Baltimore hardcore band, Ruiner. Carpathian finished the year by headlining the Generation 2010 Australian hardcore festival in Melbourne on 26 December.

=== 2011 ===
Carpathian announced another European tour, headlining with support provided by American hardcore band Defeater. Their planned first American tour with The Carrier was cancelled when Kirby announced the group would be disbanding indefinitely. The final show was in Melbourne on Friday, 29 April 2011. Kirby has since said he would "love to do a Carpathian reunion" and had tried to do so, but considered it unlikely "at this stage" as the band members no longer keep in touch and are busy with other activities.

== Members ==
- Martin Kirby - vocals
- Joshua Manitta - guitar
- Edward Redclift - bass guitar
- David Bichard - drums
- Lloyd Carroll - guitar

=== Former members ===
- Michael Crafter - vocals (2006–2007)
- Anthony Harris - guitar (2003–2006)
- Julian Marsh - guitar (2004–2006)
- Chris Farmer - bass guitar (2003–2007)
- Ben Coyte - guitar (2007–2008)
- Brendan Cross - guitar (2003–2004)
- Simon Dreja - Drums (2003–2004)

== Discography ==
=== Albums ===
List of albums, with Australian chart positions
Title	Album details	Peak chart positions
Title	Album details	AUS
Nothing To Lose	Released: April 2006; Format: CD; Label: Resist Records (RES050)	110
Isolation	Released: August 2008; Format: CD, LP; Label: Resist Records (RES078)	19

=== Extended plays ===
List of EPs, with selected details
Title	Details
Carpathian	Released: 2004; Format: CD; Label: Washed Up Records (WUR001)
Wrecked	Released: 2007; Format: CD; Label: Resist Records (RES072)
Wanderlust	Released: 2010; Format: CD, digital, LP; Label: Deathwish (DWI105) / Resist Records (RES101)
