= Killing the Dream =

American hardcore punk band

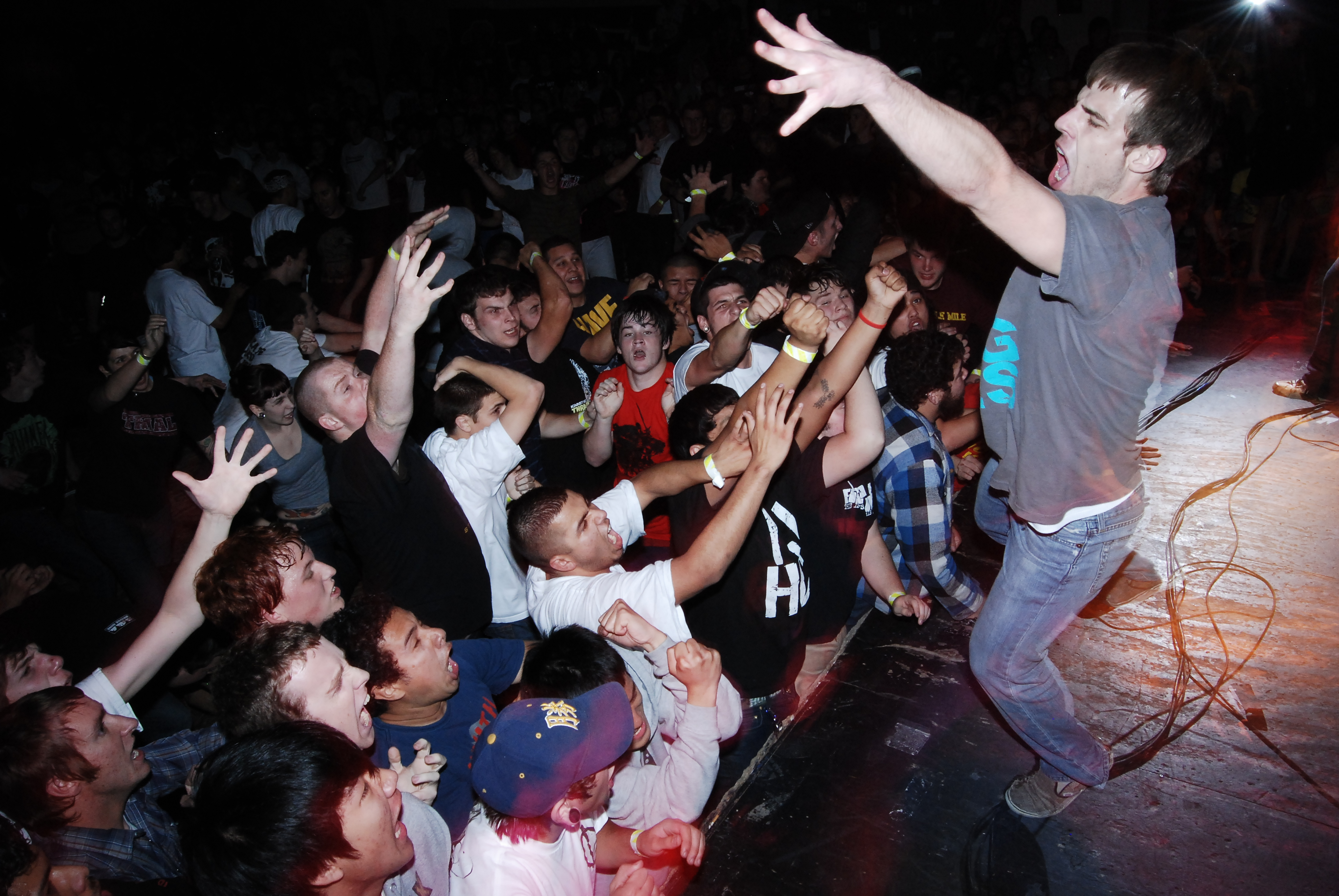
- Vocalist Elijah Horner performing live in 2007

Background information
- Origin: Sacramento, California
- Genres: Hardcore punk, melodic hardcore, emo
- Years active: 2002–2011
- Labels: Deathwish, Rivalry Records
- Past members: Chris Chase; Isaac Fratini; Pat Guild; Elijah Horner; DJ Rogers; Joel Adams; Bart Mullis; Phil Jones

Killing the Dream was an American hardcore punk band from Sacramento, California, that formed in 2002 and broke up in 2011. The group signed to Deathwish Inc. in 2004, and released three studio albums through the label: In Place Apart (2005), Fractures (2008) and Lucky Me (2010).

== History ==
Killing the Dream formed in Sacramento in 2002 with guitarist Joel Adams of Embrace the End, bassist Chris Chase, drummer Isaac Fratini and vocalist Elijah Horner. After recording a five-song demo tape in 2003, the group added second guitarist Bart Mullis—also of Embrace the End. The songs from this demo made up half of their self-titled debut album, released in 2004 through Rivalry Records.

Killing the Dream signed to Deathwish Inc. in December 2004, and first released the 7-inch EP I Rewrote It through the label in early 2005. This EP has been referred to as an "introductory" release by Isaac Fratini. Their proper full-length follow-up album, In Place Apart, was released on September 13, 2005. In Place Apart was produced by Kurt Ballou and the cover art was designed by Jacob Bannon; both of which are from the hardcore band Converge. Alternative Press magazine declared the album to be the best hardcore record of 2005. In November 2005, the band toured in support of In Place Apart with No Trigger and Crime in Stereo. Support continued into 2006 and 2007 when Killing the Dream toured internationally in Japan and Europe.

Promotional poster for Killing the Dream's final show

The band released their second studio album Fractures on June 10, 2008, through Deathwish. Killing the Dream recorded the music for the studio album in May 2007, however by August 2007 the vocal tracks had yet to be recorded. After extensive touring following part of the recordings, vocalist Elijah Horner wanted to allow his throat to rest for optimal performance in the studio causing extensive delays in the release. Fractures was produced by J. Robbins of Jawbox fame. In early 2009, Killing the Dream toured with The Carrier in Europe. They were also a part of The Great American Hardcore Fest in September 2009.

Their third and final studio album, Lucky Me, was released on November 23, 2010. The Zach Ohren and Pat Hills produced album took Killing the Dream in a more melodic direction musically, featuring more clean vocals and string arrangements along with their typical screamed vocals and hardcore stylings. The title of the album, created by vocalist Elijah Horner, is meant to be partly sarcastic and partly genuine. This idea is continued through the lyrics as Lucky Me is a reflection of Horner's life and how he feels lucky to be where he was with his band and teaching job at the time of the recording. Musically, the band wrote whatever came naturally to them without any preconceived idea of how they wanted it to turn out.

Killing the Dream performed their final show on July 2, 2011, at 924 Gilman Street in California with The Carrier, All Teeth, and DCOI. In the group's final statement Killing the Dream said, "We only ever wanted to do a 7-inch EP. The fact that we stayed a band for so long, made it all across the globe, we are truly spoiled. Thank you everyone for the support."

== Members ==
Final lineup

- Chris Chase – bass guitar
- Isaac Fratini – drums
- Pat Guild – guitars
- Elijah Horner – vocals
- DJ Rogers – guitars

Former members

- Joel Adams – guitars
- Bart Mullis – guitars
- Phil Jones – guitars

== Discography ==
Studio albums

- In Place Apart (2005)
- Fractures (2008)
- Lucky Me (2010)

EPs

- Demo (2003)
- I Rewrote It (2005)

Compilations

- Killing the Dream (2004)
