= Cult Leader =

American hardcore punk band

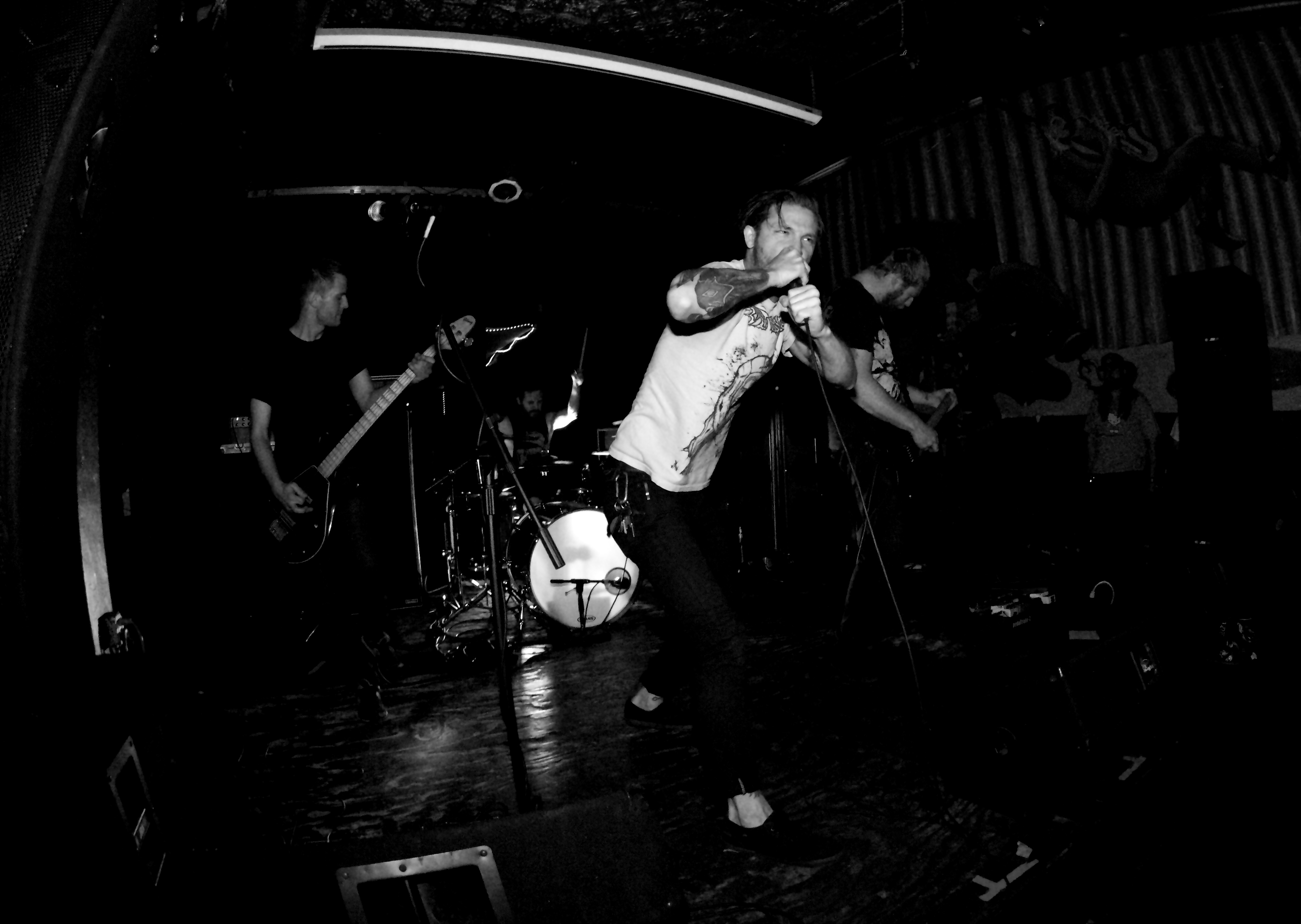
- Cult Leader performing live in May 2014

Background information
- Origin: Salt Lake City, Utah
- Genres: Metalcore; crust punk; grindcore; sludge metal
- Years active: 2013–present
- Label: Deathwish
- Spinoff of: Gaza
- Members: Casey Hansen; Anthony Lucero; Mike Mason; Sam Richards
- Website: cultleadermusic.tumblr.com

Cult Leader is an American hardcore punk band that formed in 2013 in Salt Lake City, Utah. It was founded by three members of Gaza following the band's break-up. Cult Leader signed to Jacob Bannon's record label Deathwish Inc. and have released two studio albums, Lightless Walk (2015) and A Patient Man (2018), as well two EPs through the label, showcasing a brutal sound with prominent elements of extreme metal.

== History ==
In late 2012, an unnamed woman from Idaho began posting on her social media accounts alleging that a member of the Salt Lake City band Gaza had raped her, and later identified the Gaza member as its vocalist, Jon Parkin. In January 2013, Gaza posted a status update on their Facebook account denying that the rape allegations were true, calling the claims "reckless and completely slanderous," and the matter was settled privately between the two parties. An excerpt from the woman's blog following the resolution read: "Neither of us are retracting our respective statements – instead we are deciding to not discuss it further and move on." Despite the resolution, Gaza formally announced its break up in March 2013, and their announcement also stated: "some of us will continue to make music together." In addition to the rape allegations, the other members of Gaza also cited tension between them and Parkin that had been building up over the course of two years. Gaza bassist Anthony Lucero said:

It started to become really frustrating and tours were getting cancelled and all kinds of stuff was happening, so when that stupid, horrible shit blew up on the Internet, then it had reached the point where the three of us said that we'd had enough of this, it's done, and so we decided to actually kick Jon [Parkin] out of the band. Then we sat with Gaza for awhile, trying to figure out what we were going to do, and eventually it felt like the only right thing to do was just start from scratch.

In May 2013, two months after the break-up announcement, former Gaza members guitarist Mike Mason, drummer Casey Hansen and Anthony Lucero – who was Gaza's bassist, but switched to lead vocals for this project – announced they formed a new band called Cult Leader, and recruited Sam Richards on bass. They decided on the name Cult Leader because it conjured up vivid imagery, and Lucero commented: "A friend of ours actually suggested that and my brain lit up. I loved all the references and all the meanings."

Cult Leader released its debut EP Nothing for Us Here on April 15, 2014, through Deathwish Inc. The release "came together" in about a week, and the band was considering self-releasing the album for a while. They sent a copy to their friend Jacob Bannon of Converge to see what he thought of the music, who in turn suggested that Cult Leader release the EP through his own label, Deathwish. The title of EP was, in part, a reference to Gaza's break up. Nothing for Us Here was met with generally favorable reviews upon release, and Cult Leader toured the US in April–May 2014 in support of it.

In November 2014, Cult Leader announced their plans to release a 7-inch EP and a full-length studio album in 2015. The 7-inch is a three-song EP titled Useless Animal that will be released on June 16, 2015, through Deathwish. The EP notably featured a cover of Mark Kozelek (Red House Painters, Sun Kil Moon) and Deathshore's collaboration track "You Are Not My Blood," which originally appeared on their 2013 album Mark Kozelek & Desertshore. Before the release of the EP, Cult Leader toured across the US as they traveled from Utah to producer and Converge member Kurt Ballou's GodCity Studio in Massachusetts to record their first full-length album in March 2015, and continued to tour North America through May 2015 immediately after recording was finished. The full-length album, titled Lightless Walk, was released on October 16, 2015, through Deathwish followed by an October–November 2015 supporting North American tour.

On November 9, 2018, Cult Leader released its second studio album A Patient Man through Deathwish. The band began promoting the Ballou-produced album with an online stream of "I Am Healed" in September 2018.

== Members ==
- Casey Hansen – drums (ex-Gaza)
- Anthony Lucero – vocals (ex-Gaza)
- Michael "Mike" Mason – guitar (ex-Gaza)
- Sam Richards – bass (Rile)

== Discography ==
=== Studio albums ===
- Lightless Walk (2015)
- A Patient Man (2018)

=== EPs ===
- Nothing for Us Here (2014)
- Useless Animal (2015)
- Gather & Mourn (split with End) (2022)

=== Singles ===
- Learn To Love It (2024)
