= 100 Demons =

American metalcore band

- Origin: Connecticut, U.S.
- Genres: Metalcore, beatdown hardcore
- Years active: 1998–present
- Labels: Goodlife, Dead Serious, Deathwish, Closed Casket Activities
- Members: Pete Morcey; Rich Rosa; Jeremy Braddock; Rick Brayall; Sean Martin
- Past members: Bruce Lepage; Tim Mead; Steve Karp; Nick August; Mike Livingston; Collin Reilly; Erik Barrett (died 2024)

100 Demons are an American metalcore band from Waterbury, Connecticut. Being fans of tattoos, the band derived their name from a book of traditional Japanese tattoo artwork by Horiyoshi III. The band usually incorporates their agnostic beliefs into their lyrics.

After over a decade of playing in the Connecticut hardcore scene, Deathwish Inc. announced the signing of 100 Demons to a record contract in 2003. In a press release, the label was quoted as saying "Today's 100 DEMONS encapsulate a viciousness and ravenous intensity that few could achieve." The band then found themselves at Planet Z Studios with producer Zeuss recording their self-titled album.

The video for the song "Repeat Process" was featured on Headbangers Ball.

In 2019, Pete Morcey announced his new folk-influenced side project entitled Murmur.

On August 20, 2024, Pete Morcey announced on Instagram that bassist Erik Barrett had died at the age of 48.

On April 21, 2026 the band announced their third studio album, Embrace The Black Light, to be released on June 5 of the same year via Closed Casket Activities.

== Members ==
Current

- Pete Morcey – vocals (2001-2006, 2007-present)
- Rich Rosa – drums (1998-present)
- Jeremy Braddock – guitar (1998-present); bass (2024-2025)
- Rick Brayall – guitar (1999-present); bass (2024-2025)
- Sean Martin - bass (2025-present), guitar (1998-1999)

Former

- Bruce LePage - vocals (1998-2001, 2006-2007)
- Tim Mead
- Colin Reilly
- Jay McGuire - bass (1998-1999)
- Steve Karp - bass (1999-2000)
- Erik Barrett - bass (2000-2024) (died 2024)

Timeline

== Discography ==
Album title
In the Eyes of the Lord
- Released: October 17, 2000
- Label(s): Good Life Recordings
100 Demons
- Released: March 9, 2004
- Label(s): Deathwish Inc.
Embrace the Black Light
- Released: June 5, 2026
- Label(s): Closed Casket Activities

== Music videos ==
- "Repeat Process" (2004)
