= Doomriders =

American metal band

- Origin: Boston, Massachusetts, U.S.
- Genres: Stoner metal, sludge metal
- Labels: Deathwish
- Members: Nate Newton; Chris Pupecki; Q Chris Johnson
- Past members: Chris Bevilacqua; John-Robert Conners; Jebb Riley

Doomriders is an American stoner/sludge metal band from Boston, Massachusetts. The band has released three albums on Deathwish, Inc. The band's vocalist/guitarist Nate Newton also plays bass in Converge and guitar in Old Man Gloom. Jebb Riley formerly played bass in There Were Wires. Doomriders have toured with Coliseum and Saviours. The band began work on their third studio album in 2011 with an expected release date in 2013 through Deathwish. Doomriders released Grand Blood on October 15, 2013.

In October 2014, Chris Pupecki and former Doomriders drummer Chris Bevilacqua released a self-titled EP through Magic Bullet Records under the name Wormwood.

== Band members ==
Current members

- Nate Newton – guitar, vocals
- Chris Pupecki – guitar
- Q – drums (2010–present)
- Chris Johnson – bass

Former members

- John-Robert Conners – drums
- Chris Bevilacqua – drums
- Jebb Riley – bass, vocals

== Discography ==
Studio albums

- Black Thunder (2005, Deathwish)
- Darkness Come Alive (2009, Deathwish)
- Grand Blood (2013, Deathwish)

EPs and splits

- Live at the Middle East (2005, Deathwish)
- Not of This World (split with Coliseum) (2005, Level Plane)
- Long Hair and Tights (split with Boris) (2007, Daymare)
- Doomriders / Disfear (split with Disfear) (2008, Deathwish)
- Are We Not Men? (split with Sweet Cobra) (2012, Hawthorne Street)

== Reception ==
Doomriders' 2009 release Darkness Come Alive was generally praised by reviewers. Shawn Bosler of Decibel magazine lauded the band's skilled songwriting, saying that "the stellar songwriting sounds like a well-honed band working together, stretching out the tunes and getting all ninja pyrotechnic on your ass." Nick Gergesha of hearwaxmedia.com called it "nothing less than pure sensory enlightenment", noting that the album was "crafted with the utmost respect for the listener".
