= Loma Prieta (band) =

American hardcore punk band

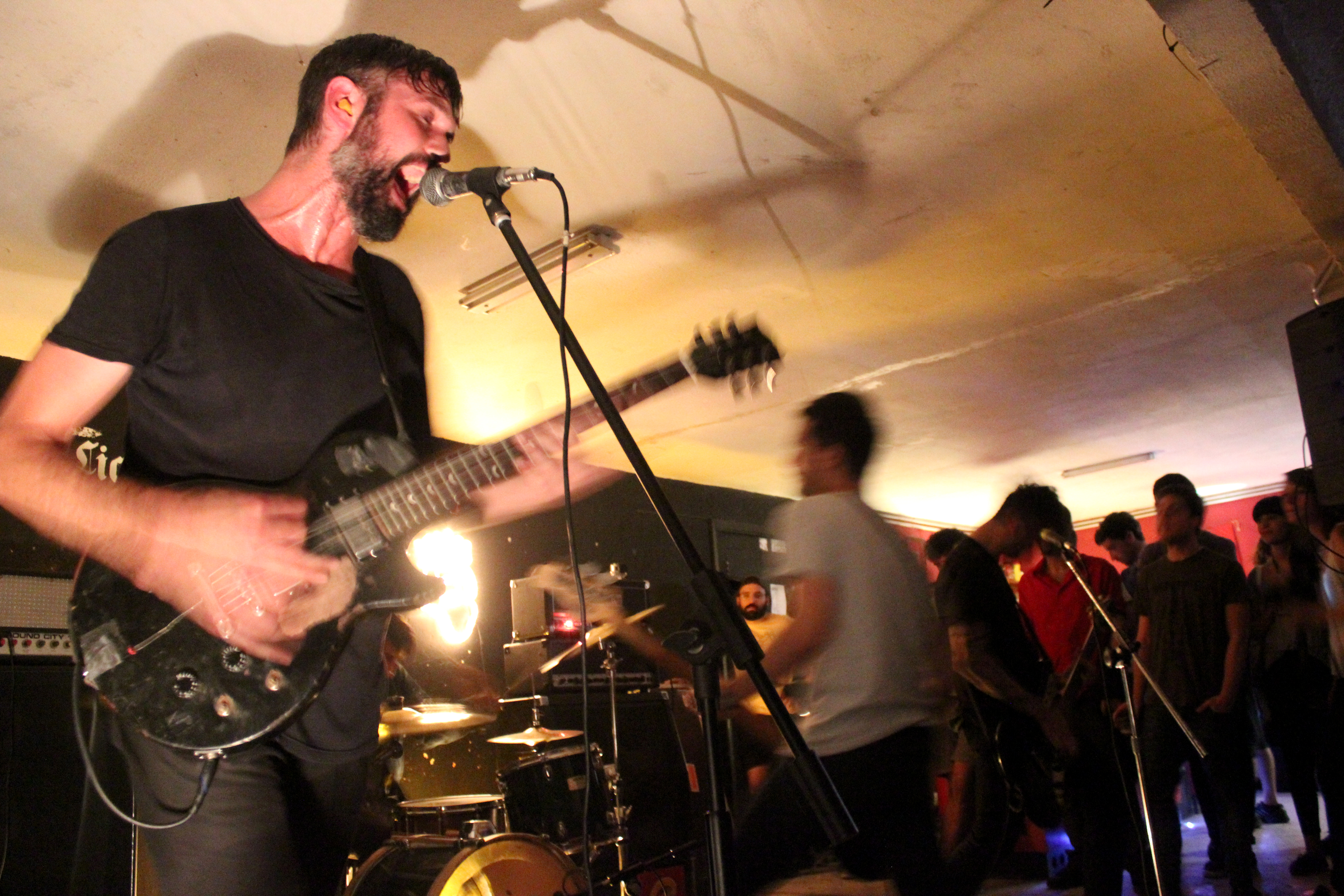
- Loma Prieta at Liceo Mutante, Pontevedra

Background information
- Origin: San Francisco, California, U.S.
- Genres: Screamo, powerviolence
- Years active: 2005–present
- Labels: Deathwish; Discos Huelga; React with Protest; Rok Lok
- Members: Sean Leary; Valeriano Saucedo; Brian Kanagaki; James Siboni
- Past members: David Fung; Derrick Chao; Jake Spek
- Website: loma-prieta.com

Loma Prieta (translates to "Dark Hill" from Spanish) is an American hardcore punk band that formed in 2005. The group is based in San Francisco, California and derived their name from the 1989 Loma Prieta earthquake. Most of the group's early material was released on their own record label named Discos Huelga. Loma Prieta has toured the US, Mexico, Canada, Europe and Japan. They share members with Punch. Their often dark and emotionally charged music blends a range of styles, most prominently screamo and powerviolence.

In June 2011, Loma Prieta recorded music for their fourth studio album with Jack Shirley. Their signing to Deathwish Inc. was announced in October 2011, and released their fourth studio album, titled I.V., through their new label on January 17, 2012. The album received positive reviews from AbsolutePunk, Alternative Press, and Exclaim!. Two music videos, for the songs "Fly by Night" and "Trilogy 4 - Momentary", have been released to promote I.V. In support of I.V., Loma Prieta toured New Zealand and Australia in January 2012, the United States with Birds in Row in March 2012 and North America with Converge and Git Some in April 2012. The band recorded and released a split with Raein in 2013.

On October 2, 2015, Loma Prieta released their fifth full-length studio album titled Self Portrait. The album was described as being a more "literal" and positive album lyrically as opposed to being more "opaque" and angry on previous albums, while sonically Loma Prieta incorporates more melody while retaining the same level of hardcore intensity. To promote the album, the band released a single for the album's opening track "Love" backed with and exclusive B-side titled "Trilogy 0 (Debris)". They also released a music video for "Love" in September 2015.

== Members ==
Current members

- Sean Leary – guitar, vocals (2005–present)
- Valeriano Saucedo – drums (2005–present)
- Brian Kanagaki – backing vocals, bass (2008–2011), guitar (2011–present)
- James Siboni – bass (2014–present)

Former members

- David Fung – vocals, guitar (2005–2007)
- Derrick Chao – guitar (2005–2009)
- Jake Spek – bass (2011–2014)

Touring members

- Josh Staples - bass, vocals (sporadically 2010–present)

== Discography ==
Studio albums

- Last City (2008)
- Dark Mountain (2009)
- Life/Less (2010)
- I.V. (2012)
- Self Portrait (2015)
- Last (2023)

Extended plays

- Our LP Is Your EP (2006)
- Matrimony (2007)
- Loma Prieta / Raein (split with Raein) (2013)

Singles

- "Love"/"Trilogy 0 (Debris)" (2015)
- "Continuum"/"Fate" (2020)

=== Music videos ===
Year	Song	Director
2011	"Trilogy 4 'Momentary'"	Evan Henkel
2012	"Fly by Night"	Evan Henkel
2015	"Love"	
