= Blacklisted (band) =

American hardcore punk band

Background information
- Origin: Philadelphia, Pennsylvania, U.S.
- Genres: Hardcore punk
- Years active: 2003–2018, 2023, 2025-
- Labels: Deathwish, Six Feet Under
- Past members: George Hirsch; Dave Walling; Shawn Foley; Jon Nean; Todd Jones; Jay Pepito; Andy Nelson; Tim Smith; Ian Vollmer

Blacklisted is an American hardcore punk band from Philadelphia, Pennsylvania, formed in 2003. They released four studio albums and toured North America, Europe, Australia, New Zealand, and Japan.

== History ==
The band formed in the early 2000s, and comprised George Hirsch (vocals), Jon Nean (guitar), Tim Smith (bass), and Zach Trotta (drums). The band self-released their debut self-titled 7-inch EP in 2003. This led to a deal with the Stillborn label and another EP, Our Youth Is Wasted. Pepito left to form Reign Supreme. The band then recorded a series of split releases for the Deathwish label, who also reissued the band's first two releases together as We're Unstoppable, described by PopMatters as "a furiously brief dose of old-school punk and hardcore dissonance". The band's release, No One Deserves to Be Here More Than Me, featured a stylistic turn to an early 90s grunge sound, abandoning most of the speed and favoring heavy, repetitive grooves.

In November 2013, Blacklisted frontman George Hirsch released an acoustic solo album titled There's Honey in the Soil So We Wait for the Till under the moniker Harm Wülf.

Blacklisted began writing a fourth studio album and follow up to 2009's No One Deserves to Be Here More Than Me in late 2013. Their fourth studio album titled When People Grow, People Go was produced by Will Yip and was released in February 2015 through Deathwish. The album's sound is a mix of Blacklisted's style on the experimental album No One Deserves to Be Here More Than Me with the style on the hardcore album Heavier Than Heaven, Lonelier Than God.

In 2023, the band announced a reunion co-headlining show with the newly reunited Unbroken at the First Unitarian Church in Philadelphia with support from Damnation A.D, Entry, and Crashing Forward. This show sold out in under a minute, therefore, a second night was added with support from Indecision, Magnitude, and Scarab..

== Members ==
=== Current members ===
- Zach Trotta – drums
- George Hirsch – vocals
- Jon Nean – guitars
- Jay Pepito - guitars
- Dave Walling – bass

=== Former members ===
- Jay Pepito – guitars (2004)
- Tim Smith – bass (2003–?)
- Zach Trotta – drums (2003–?)
- Ian Vollmer – guitars (touring) (2006–?)
- Todd Jones – guitars (2007–2008)

== Discography ==
Studio albums

- ...The Beat Goes On (Deathwish, 2005)
- Heavier Than Heaven, Lonelier Than God (Deathwish, 2008)
- No One Deserves to Be Here More Than Me (Deathwish, 2009)
- When People Grow, People Go (Deathwish, 2015)

Compilations

- We're Unstoppable (Deathwish, 2005)

Extended plays

- Demo (Walk All Night, 2003)
- Our Youth Is Wasted (Walk All Night, Stillborn), 2003)
- The Dead Man's Hand 03 [split with First Blood] (Deathwish, 2004)
- Live from Nowhere, USA (6131, 2006)
- Peace on Earth, War on Stage (Deathwish, 2007)
- Eccentrichine (Six Feet Under, 2010)
- So, You Are a Magician? (Six Feet Under, 2012)
- Live on BBC 1 (Six Feet Under, 2012)
- Dry Shaving b/w Please Go Away (Six Feet Under, 2017)
- Slow Moments b/w I Should've Been a Murderer (Six Feet Under, 2018)
- IV.MMXVIII (Control Records, 2018)

Music videos

- "I Am Weighing Me Down" (2008)
- "Turn in the Pike" (2015)

Compilation appearances

- Generations (Revelation, 2005)
