= Bloodhorse (band) =

American heavy metal band

- Origin: Boston, Massachusetts, U.S.
- Genres: Doom metal, stoner rock, sludge metal
- Years active: 2005–present
- Labels: Translation Loss Records; Iodine Recordings
- Members: Alex Garcia-Rivera; Adam Wentworth; Matt Woods

Bloodhorse is an American doom metal band from Boston, Massachusetts, United States, that formed late 2005. In 2007 they signed with Translation Loss Records, releasing their debut record "EP" in July of the same year.

== Biography ==
Bloodhorse was formed in late 2005 by bassist Matt Woods, guitarist Adam Wentworth, and drummer Alex Garcia-Rivera in Boston, Massachusetts. All three members had previously played together in the hardcore punk band Bars. The three found a musical common ground of Deep Purple and The Who at their first practices. The first four songs the band wrote were quickly recorded by the band in their practice space and self-released as a CD demo titled "Black Lung Rising" in April 2006. A year of playing shows throughout the Northeast lead to the band signing with Philadelphia-based label Translation Loss Records in 2007 to release an EP simply titled "EP". In 2009 they released the album Horizoner, while a year later Wentworth and Woods joined All Pigs Must Die. Since 2014, drummer Alex Garcia-Rivera has been releasing solo music under the moniker Chrome Over Brass and also plays in the band American Nightmare.

On March 20, 2025, the band announced their official signing to Iodine Recordings and a new album, A Malign Star, released on May 30 on the same year.

== Current members ==
- Adam Wentworth – guitar, vocals (2005–present)
- Matt Woods – bass, vocals (2005–present)
- Alex Garcia-Rivera – drums (2005–present)

== Discography ==
- Black Lung Rising CD (2006) – self-released
- EP CD (2007) – Translation Loss Records
- Horizoner CD (2009) – Transition Loss Records
- A Malign Star LP (2025) - Iodine Recordings
