= Deathwish Inc. =

American independent record label

- Founded: 2000
- Founder: Jacob Bannon, Tre McCarthy
- Distributors: The Orchard, Deathwish Direct
- Genre: Hardcore punk; extreme metal; punk rock
- Country of origin: United States
- Location: Beverly, Massachusetts
- Official website: deathwishinc.com

Deathwish Inc. is an American independent record label conceived by Jacob Bannon of Converge and Tre McCarthy in 2000. Their first release was Deeper the Wound, a split album between Converge and Japanese band Hellchild on April 23, 2001. Deathwish established itself quickly, working with a diverse group of bands and eventually becoming one of the most respected and innovative labels in contemporary hardcore punk and aggressive music in general.

After having previously worked with RED Distribution, in March 2016, Deathwish signed a global deal with Alternative Distribution Alliance (ADA), an independent distribution label under Warner Music Group that has also partnered with other punk labels including Epitaph Records, Rise Records, and Run for Cover Records.

Deathwish, Inc. has also expanded into releasing exclusive archived prints from various artists, which include Jacob Bannon.

== Related labels ==
Deathwish Inc's old circle-D logo.

Deathwish Inc's old font-style logo.

In 1999, Linas Garsys and Tru Pray founded the hardcore punk independent record label Malfunction Records. Deathwish merged with Malfunction in August 2007, and originally announced that the two labels would still exist as separate entities with Malfunction acting as an imprint label and Deathwish's staff operating both businesses. However, one of Malfunction's last releases was Bitter Ends' 2008 self-titled EP. Deathwish still distributes some of Malfunction's back catalog.

In 2012, Jeremy Bolm of Touché Amoré formed his own imprint label under Deathwish dubbed Secret Voice.

In 2014, Jami Morgan of Code Orange along with Pat Kindlon of Self Defense Family formed their own imprint under Deathwish titled Harm Reduction Records.

The label in the past has operated an imprint label Icarus Records, for more experimental and ambient sounding bands, though it has been dormant for many years and only released albums from two artists.

In 2009, Deathwish expanded into independent music distribution offering exclusive and featured distribution of other record labels. Currently, Deathwish distributes many labels including: Closed Casket Activities, ConCult (Converge self-released titles), Iodine Recordings, Discos Huelga, Grave Mistake Records, Nonbeliever, React! Records, Painkiller Records, Perfect Victim Records, Six Feet Under Records, State of Mind Recordings, and Vitriol Records.

== Deathwish Fest ==
For two nights in July 2014, Deathwish hosted back-to-back concerts in Massachusetts featuring current and formerly signed bands of the label. Both nights featured headliners Converge and Trap Them, the first show had Modern Life is War, Doomriders, Cult Leader, Self Defense Family and Harm Wülf as openers; while the second night had Young and in the Way, Code Orange, Oathbreaker, New Lows and Chrome Over Brass (Alex Garcia-Rivera of Give Up the Ghost, Bloodhorse) as openers. The label also stated that this is the first of a series of events. In May/June, the Deathwish Fest toured Europe for a 7-day gig featuring Converge, Trap Them, Harm's Way and Young and in the Way.

== Former MMA sponsorship ==
Deathwish began sponsoring several mixed martial arts UFC fighters in 2008. Among the label's sponsored fighters includes: Dan "The Outlaw" Hardy, Joe "J-Lau" Lauzon, Dan "The Upgrade" Lauzon, Toby "Tigerheart" Grear and several local Boston grapplers. Bannon is also a licensed MMA judge, and designed some of the fighters' clothing. Deathwish's sponsorship of MMA declined in the early 2010s and all references to this subject have been removed from its official website.

== Label discography ==
As of January 2025, Deathwish Inc's discography includes over 240 releases from over 120 different bands (including non-Deathwish artists featured on split releases). Its main discography most prominently features 25 releases from Converge, 13 from Self Defense Family (End of a Year) and 11 from Blacklisted.

In March 2014, Deathwish uploaded its entire catalog onto the music streaming/purchasing service, Bandcamp.

== Current artists ==
- Bitter End
- Blacklisted
- Bossk
- Burn
- Cold Cave
- Cold World
- Converge
- Cult Leader (featuring three members of Gaza)
- Doomriders
- Frail Body
- Glare
- Gouge Away
- Greet Death
- HarborLights
- HeavenlyBLue
- The Hope Conspiracy
- Loma Prieta
- Mad Honey
- Modern Life Is War
- Oathbreaker
- Planes Mistaken for Stars
- Process Black
- State Faults
- Wear Your Wounds

== Former artists ==
- 100 Demons
- 108
- AC4
- Acid Tiger
- A Life Once Lost
- American Nightmare/Give Up the Ghost
- Birds in Row
- The Blinding Light
- Boysetsfire
- Breather Resist
- Burning Love
- Carpathian
- The Carrier
- Ceremony
- Chrome Over Brass (Alex Garcia-Rivera)
- Code Orange (formerly Code Orange Kids)
- Coliseum
- Cursed
- Damage
- Deafheaven
- Death Index
- Death of Lovers
- The Dedication
- Embrace Today
- Extreme Noise Terror
- First Blood
- Frameworks
- The Great Deceiver
- Harm's Way
- Harm Wülf (George Hirsch of Blacklisted)
- Heiress
- Hellchild
- Holyghost
- Horror Show
- I Hate You
- Integrity
- Irons
- Jacob Bannon
- Jesuseater
- Killing the Dream
- Knives Out
- Life Long Tragedy
- Lies (featuring members of The Hope Conspiracy and Skin Like Iron)
- Living Eyes
- Narrows
- New Lows
- The Power and The Glory
- The Promise
- Pulling Teeth
- Punch
- Razor Crusade
- Reach the Sky
- Ringworm
- Rise and Fall
- Rot In Hell
- Quentin Sauvé (Q. of Birds in Row)
- So Be It
- Self Defense Family
- Shipwreck A.D.
- Some Girls
- Starkweather
- The Suicide File
- Super Unison (featuring Meghan O'Neil from Punch)
- Terror
- Touché Amoré
- Trap Them
- United Nations
- Victims
- Whips/Chains
- White Jazz (featuring three members of Rise and Fall)
- Wovenhand
- Young and in the Way

== Related labels artists ==
=== Malfunction artists (1999–2008) ===
- American Nightmare
- Barfight
- Cast Aside
- Ceremony
- Four Walls Falling
- Internal Affairs
- Learn
- Meltdown
- Moment of Youth
- Piece by Piece
- Rag Men
- Reign Supreme
- Right On
- Shitfit
- Time Flies
- TouchXDown
- Trash Talk
- Wheelbite
- Worn Thin

=== Icarus artists (2003–2005) ===
- Halfacre Gunroom
- Switchblade

=== Secret Voice artists (2012–present) ===
- Dangers
- Drug Church
- Hesitation Wounds
- Infant Island
- Newmoon
- Single Mothers
- Sonagi
- Andrew Thomson
- Warm Thoughts (formally Dad Punchers)

=== Harm Reduction artists (2014–present) ===
- Axis
- Drown
- Purge
- Resistance Wire
- Steel Nation
- Detain
- Unit 731
- Threat 2 Society
