= Red and Black Attack =

Red And Black Attack

EP by The Icarus Line
- Released: Late 1998
- Recorded: August–September 1998
- Genre: Noise rock, garage punk, post hardcore
- Length: 12:00
- Label: New American Dream
- Producer: The Icarus Line

The Icarus Line chronology
Highlypuncturingnoisetestingyourabilitytohate (1998)	Red And Black Attack (1998)	Mono (2001)

Professional ratings
Review scores
Source	Rating
Allmusic	4/5 stars

Red And Black Attack was the second release from the Hollywood-based rock band The Icarus Line. The EP was recorded and released very quickly after their debut 7-inch, Highlypuncturingnoisetestingyourabilitytohate on Hellcat Records. The EP was released on New American Dream. This was the band's first release to appear on CD, as well as New American Dream's debut release. The vinyl version was pressed by Slowgun Records on clear "wine" colored vinyl 7-inches.

New American Dream also released the band's split 7-inch picture disc with Ink & Dagger, and had actually originally signed Ink & Dagger to release their third, and final album on the label. However, after a car crash involving the label's owner and members of Ink & Dagger, who were on their way to visit The Icarus Line during a rehearsal, the label soon fell apart. The resulting fiasco was the prime reason The Icarus Line didn't record their debut album in 1999, as originally intended, and ended up signing instead with Crank! Records. Coincidentally, Ink & Dagger, who had also signed to the label for the release of their third and last album, ended up having Buddyhead release it instead. Other bands on the short-lived label included Discount (band) and Kind Of Like Spitting. The label's folding, resulted in this release being out of print for many years, and a highly sought after collectable.

The EP was named as a reference to the band's visual style, which involved dressing in black with red neckties. This look was abandoned years later, after a number of other bands had started dressing similarly. Some of these bands went on to much greater mainstream success. So, as not to look like the "copycats" themselves, this attire was then "retired" by The Icarus Line.

This release also coincided with yet another of the band's recurring problems of finding a suitable, and permanent drummer. This is why there is no drummer pictured on the cover of this release, something which confused people for quite some time. At the time of the EP's release, John Guerra (F-Minus, Black Fag) was filling the position. Soon after, the band recruited their fourth drummer, Mike Felix (Toys That Kill, Ex-Fork).

As an homage to their former band's drummer, Tim Childs, The Icarus Line included snippets he had recorded while playing drums at home, very briefly before his death. These were the last known recordings of Tim playing drums. The song "Separate The Sounds", was also quite obviously written about Tim, and his abrupt passing. These home recordings were spliced together during mastering by Blag Dahlia, the singer of The Dwarves.

== Track listing ==
1. "The Suicide Pact"
2. "Separate The Sounds"
3. "Last Night All My Teeth Fell Out"
4. "And The Sad Thing Is..."

== Personnel ==
- Joe Cardamone – Vocals
- Aaron North – Guitar
- Lance Arnao – Bass
- Alvin DeGuzman – Guitar
- Aaron Austin – Drums
- Tim Childs – Interlude Drums

=== Production ===
- Produced by The Icarus Line
- Recorded at Room 222 Studio in Hollywood, August - September 1998
- Recorded and Mixed by James Bennett
- Instrumental segues recorded at Tim Childs' home
- Photos by Travis Keller
- Layout by Jeff Caudill
- Mastered by Blag Dahlia
