= Super Unison =

American post-hardcore band

- Origin: Oakland, California
- Genres: Post-hardcore • hardcore punk
- Years active: 2014–2019
- Label: Deathwish
- Past members: Meghan O'Neil; Justin Renninger; Kevin DeFranco; Daniel "Cheyenne" Gutierrez
- Website: superunison.net

Super Unison was an American post-hardcore band that formed in 2014. The band is named after a song by Drive Like Jehu from their 1994 album Yank Crime. Vocalist Meghan O'Neil Pennie describes the band's early material as "a weird intersection of Dischord Records and riot grrrl." The band has self-released an EP and released their debut studio album Auto through Deathwish Inc. in 2016. The band announced their dissolution in September 2019.

== History ==
Following the release of Punch's 2014 third studio album They Don't Have to Believe, vocalist Meghan O'Neil Pennie was asked to join a new band featuring Justin Renninger of Snowing and former Dead Seeds members Danny Goot and Kevin DeFranco. Super Unison held its first practice in December 2014, recorded an EP in February 2015 then released it in May 2015. Some of the lyrics on this EP subtly referenced the end of Punch.

On October 14, 2016, Super Unison released its debut album titled Auto through Jacob Bannon of Converge's indie label Deathwish Inc. who previously released albums for Punch. Auto was produced by Jack Shirley (Deafheaven, Oathbreaker, Loma Prieta). Super Unison began promoting the album with an online stream of "Broken," which O'Neil Pennie says is about self-preservation. She elaborated: "Sometimes you have to walk away from something that's not good for you, despite the pressures of obligation and guilt. Some people may not understand, but you know your own feelings better than anyone." Super Unison toured the US in support of the album in October 2016. Michael Pementel of PopMatters gave the album eight-out-of-ten stars and stayed: "Many were upset with the break-up of Punch and Meghan O'Neil Pennie's departure, but those folks will be happy to know that Super Unison is far more than just a strong return; it's a memorable one, too. Super Unison continues to carry the torch for those who want to find their place in an art form that, on the surface, may appear to be a boy's club, but contains rage and power for everyone from all walks of life."

As a part of Adult Swim and Williams Street Records' "Single Program", Super Unison released the non-album single "Orchids" in September 2017.

Super Unison released its second studio album Stella through Deathwish on October 26, 2018. Stella was recorded by Steve Albini (Nirvana, The Jesus Lizard), produced by Don Devore (Ink & Dagger, The Icarus Line) and mastered by Jack Shirley.

== Members ==
- Meghan O'Neil – vocals, bass
- Kevin DeFranco – guitars
- Justin Renninger – drums

== Discography ==
=== Studio albums ===
- Auto (2016, Deathwish)
- Stella (2018, Deathwish)

=== EPs and singles ===
- Super Unison EP (2015, self-released)
- "Photorealism" single (2015, self-released)
- "Orchids" single (2017, Williams Street)
