= The Jimi Homeless Experience =

American comedy rock band

- Jimi Homeless live in Los Angeles, 2008. Left to right: Robin Johnson, Josh Curtis, Jason DeCorse.

Background information
- Origin: Los Angeles, California, USA
- Genres: Comedy rock; parody
- Years active: 2007–2010
- Label: MK-ULTRA RECORDS
- Past members: Josh Curtis (vocals); Jason DeCorse (guitar); Robin Johnson (bass); Tim Hogan (bass); Gary Davenport (bass); Bill Lanham (bass); Ron Pak (drums); Chad Stewart (drums); Kevin Zelch (drums); Shay Godwinn (drums); Jon Kinyon (dj)

The Jimi Homeless Experience was an American comedy rock act created, produced and managed by Jon Kinyon. The band, which included members from Faster Pussycat, John Waite, Daniel Cartier, and The Icarus Line, performed live from 2007 to 2010, mainly in and around Hollywood, CA. The band often appeared with cover bands such as The Spazmatics, Nearvana, and Knights of Monte Carlo.

A full-length parody album of Jimi Hendrix' biggest hits, featuring lyrics by Jon Kinyon, entitled Are You Homeless?, was released on August 23, 2007, the 40th anniversary of the release of Jimi Hendrix' first LP Are You Experienced. A follow-up EP entitled Band of Junkys was released July 4, 2009.

== The band ==
Musicians on record releases Are You Homeless? and Band of Junkys:

- Josh Curtis (Daniel Cartier) – vocals, bass guitar;
- Jason DeCorse (The Icarus Line) – guitar;
- Kevin Zelch – drums.

Musicians for live shows:

- Josh Curtis (Daniel Cartier) – vocals;
- Jason DeCorse (The Icarus Line) – guitar;
- Bill Lanham – bass guitar;
- Tim Hogan (John Waite) – bass guitar;
- Robin Johnson – bass guitar;
- Gary Davenport – bass guitar;
- Chad Stewart (Faster Pussycat)– drums;
- Ron Pak – drums;
- Shay Godwinn – drums;
- Jon Kinyon – dj.

== Discography ==
- 2007: Are You Homeless?
- 2009: Band of Junkys

== Related works ==
- The Jimi Homeless Experience (webcomic)
- A Jimi Homeless stop motion animation was featured on MyToons, a YouTube-styled website specifically geared for 2-D and 3-D animation, in March 2008.
