= Jon Kinyon =

American writer (born 1962)

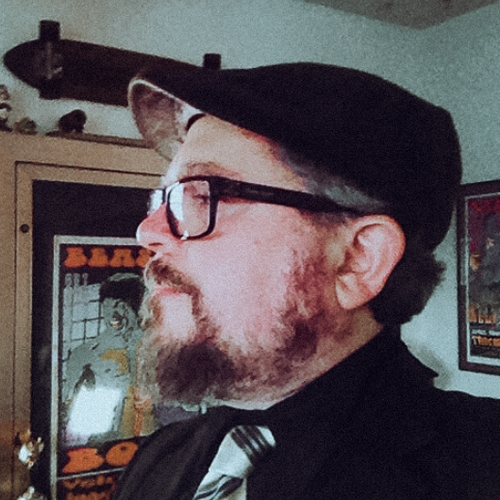
- Promotional photo
- Born: Jonathan Foster Kinyon; March 29, 1962 (age 64); Palo Alto, California, U.S.
- Other name: J.F. Kinyon
- Occupations: Writer, Filmmaker, Television editor, Music Producer, Entrepreneur
- Known for: Founder/President of Hot Rod Condoms (condom brand); Creator of The Jimi Homeless Experience; Producer, Writer & Director of the film God Squad!.
- Website: http://www.jonkinyon.com

Jon Kinyon (born March 29, 1962) is an American writer, Emmy Award-nominated TV editor, filmmaker, music producer, and entrepreneur.

== Hot Rod Condoms ==
Jon Kinyon is the founder and president of Hot Rod Condoms, a U.S. condom brand which he launched in 1994.

== God Squad! ==
In 2002 he wrote, produced and directed God Squad!, a comedy film which parodied Christian Films and 1970s Buddy Cop Films. It featured cult film actress and former Penthouse Pet of the Year (1993) Julie Strain as well as actor Al Israel who is famous for his roles in Scarface, Carlito's Way, and Body Double. Composer Bob Crail is credited with writing the film's musical score. After its premiere at the Academy Award accredited Los Angeles International Short Film Festival the film went on to screen at Tromadance 2003, the Backseat Film Festival and several other U.S. film festivals. This film is included in the European version of "The Best of Tromadance" DVD.

== The Jimi Homeless Experience ==
=== Webcomic ===
A fictional character named Jimi Homeless first appeared in a series of webcomics published as The Jimi Homeless Experience in 2006. The webcomics were written by Jon Kinyon and drawn by an underground cartoonist known as Big Tasty. The strip was primarily about a small group of social outcasts and proudly flaunted its Grotesque orientation and black humor.

=== Parody album ===
August 23, 2007, Jon released a full-length CD of parody songs he had written and produced, all inspired by the aforementioned webcomic. The first CD by The Jimi Homeless Experience was released on the exact day of the 40th anniversary of Jimi Hendrix' first album release Are You Experienced, his Are You Homeless? features "Weird Al" Yankovic-styled parodies of some of Hendrix' biggest hits.

=== Stop motion animation ===
On March 6, 2008, he became the first "Featured Animator" on the now defunct MyToons, a YouTube-styled website specifically geared for 2-D and 3-D animation, with a stop motion animation parody of Jimi Hendrix' key performance at the 1967 Monterey Pop Festival.

=== Book of jokes ===
On July 3, 2023, Jon published Street Smarts, a book containing more than 300 jokes and quotes attributed to the fictional character, Jimi Homeless. Most of the satirical and black humor jokes are one-liners that lampoon stereotypes, or offer insight into the plight of the homeless.

== Night of the Loving Dead (2014) ==
Jon Kinyon wrote and directed a parody of the classic horror film Night of the Living Dead. The short film was co-produced with his two brothers C.J. Kinyon and C.C. Kinyon, and was filmed at a long-abandoned cemetery in Half Moon Bay, CA. It premiered as an Official Selection in 2014 in the web based film festival Once a Week Online Film Festival.

== Television editor at Nickelodeon ==
Jon has worked in the film and television industry since 1988. He has been a film and TV editor in Los Angeles, California, since 1997 and has been employed at Nickelodeon Animation Studio since 2005. He served as supervising picture editor for 3 seasons of the animated TV show Pinky Malinky. Season 1 of the show was released by Netflix on January 1, 2019.

=== Daytime Emmy Award nomination ===
The 2020 Daytime Emmy nominations were announced on Thursday, May 21, live on CBS’ The Talk and later on Gold Derby. Nominated for “Outstanding Editing for an Animated Program” was the show Pinky Malinky on which Jon worked as the lead editor.

== Short stories published by OZY Magazine ==
A total of seven stories were published by OZY between August 2017 and August 2020.

- Stepdaddy Dearest: Putting The Crime Into Crime Family is a story Jon wrote about his criminal stepfather. It was published on August 29, 2017.
- Will The Real Parachuting Hijacker Please Stand Up is a story about a family friend who spent 30 years as a suspect in the D.B. Cooper hijacking case. It was published on April 19, 2018.
- Who Murdered My Father? is a story about the murder of Jon's father in 1972, as well as the subsequent lies, obfuscation, and runaround the San Francisco Police Department forced his family to endure. It was published on November 26, 2018.
- Raising Hell, Raised by Hells Angels was published on September 26, 2019. This story is about a long-time family friend who became President of the Daly City chapter of the Hells Angels.
- That Time I Was Roofied In Hong Kong is a story about a dangerous vacation experience in Wan Chai, Hong Kong. It was published on November 12, 2019.
- "The Convivial Call of Casual Racism" was published on July 22, 2020, and it details a run-in with a race-baiter at a Fourth of July party in the Hollywood Hills.
- When Jesus Freaks Go Bad was published on August 6, 2020. An accidental death leads to Jon's friend becoming a religious zealot. As time passes, his friend's religious beliefs turn more political and radical.

== Private investigation: Andy Kinyon Cold Case ==
On Sept. 10, 2021, a story about Jon Kinyon's 10+ year-long private investigation into his father's 1972 murder cold case made the front cover of his hometown weekly newspaper: Palo Alto Weekly. Suspicions of a 40-year police cover-up and continued stonewalling by the San Francisco Police Department are laid out in the article.

=== Journalism award ===
In May 2022, the story, Searching For Their Father's Killer, won First Place for Investigative Reporting in the 2021 California Journalism Awards for print weeklies with a circulation of 25,000 and over, presented by the California News Publishers Association.

== Published Novels ==
Kinyon has a growing list of novels, short stories, and poetry books published in both fiction and non-fiction genres.

- San Francisco's Hottest Cold Case is Jon Kinyon's first non-fiction novel, published in March 2023. The book details his 12-year private investigation of his father's 1972 murder cold case and exposes a cover-up by the San Francisco Police Department. Ultimately, Jon's investigation leads to the case being officially closed and the main suspect being named as "the person responsible" for his father's murder.
- Sweet Hitchhiker: The Last Resort is Jon's first fiction novel, which was also published in March 2023. This book is the first in a series about a man known as "Hippy Bob" who spent half of his life living on the road, hitchhiking up and down the west coast of the United States, Canada, and Mexico, and lucked into a career as a porn star during the Golden Age of Porn. This book is about the man's open relationship with a young woman named Virginia Voyt and their Swinging lifestyle in the early 1980s.
- God Squad! Hollywood & Divine is his second published work of fiction and it is a novella based on his 2002 short film of the same title. The book version has many additional scenes and dialog, as well as a different ending. The satirical story, as described by Doug Sakmann of Troma Entertainment, is "A hilarious and campy send-up of 70's cop shows with a strange, pseudo-reverent twist. Featuring a duo of born-again evangelists fighting the forces of Satan and Hollywood." The book was published in September, 2024 by Chapin & Wardwell Book Publishers.
- Tales of Renfield's Vampirats: Book I is a Young Adult fiction book published in August 2026. The Gothic short story reveals of the origins of a new breed of vampire: Vampire Rats, who decide to become pirate adventurers on the high seas.
- The Other Driver: A Novella is Kinyon's foray into psychological horror. Published in August 2026, this book is best described as Beat Noir: a stripped-down all-American road story with counterculture DNA that gradually mutates into psychological horror, supernatural suspense, and American Gothic.
