= Don Devore =

- Birth name: Donald Willard Devore Jr.
- Born: Philadelphia, Pennsylvania
- Genres: Alternative rock, shoegaze, hardcore punk
- Instrument(s): Guitar, bass, keyboards, vocals
- Years active: 1993-present
- Labels: Shangri-La Music, Buddyhead Records, Dim Mak Records, Cooperative Music, V2 Records, Initial Records

Donald Willard Devore Jr. is an American artist and curator, known as Don Devore, who has been a member of the bands Ink & Dagger, Frail, Rain on the Parade, The Icarus Line, Lilys, Amazing Baby, Historics, Vague Angels, and Souls She Said, among others. He is currently performing as a solo artist and as a member of the band Collapsing Scenery.

== Selected discography ==
With Collapsing Scenery

- 2015 Metaphysical Cops (Can Break Physical Bones) (12' single)
- 2016 Deep State (7-inch EP)
- 2016 God's Least Favorite (12-inch EP)
- 2016 The Cat Looks At The King (7-inch single)
- 2017 Straight World Problems (12-inch single)
- 2017 Money (Feat. Ninjaman) (12-inch single)
- 2018 Let's Burn Down the Cornfield / Modern World (7-inch single)
- 2019 Resort Beyond the Last Resort (10-inch single)
- 2019 Stress Positions (double LP)
- 2022 Acid Casual (12" EP)
- 2023 A Desert Called Peace (LP)

With Sick Feeling

- 2015 Suburban Myth

With Historics

- 2009 Strategies For Apprehension

With Amazing Baby

- 2009 Rewild

With Ghost Note

- 2008 Holy Jungle 12-inch

With Vague Angels

- 2007 Truth Loved

With Giant Drag

- 2005 Hearts and Unicorns

With The Icarus Line

- 2004 Penance Soiree
- 2007 Black Lives at the Golden Coast

With Souls She Said

- 2003 Rub The Sleep Out EP
- 2006 As Templar Nites

With Lilys

- 2000 Selected EP
- 2003 Precollection

With Ink & Dagger

- Drive This Seven-Inch Wooden Stake Through My Philadelphia Heart (Initial Records)
- Experiments In Nocturnal Sound and Energy (Revelation Records)
- Sensations EP
- The Fine art of Original Sin LP
- Ink and Dagger S/T LP

With Rain on The Parade

- 1996 Body Bag EP

With The Mandela Strikeforce

- 1995 The Sound Of The Revolution In Stereo

With Frail

- 2000 Make Your Own Noise
- 1993 Frail

=== As producer ===
- Super Unison – Stella (2018)
