= Wiretap (disambiguation) =

Wiretap, or telephone tap, is the monitoring of telephone and Internet conversations by a third party.

Wiretap may also refer to:

- Wiretap (film), a proposed remake of the film Overhead
- WireTap (magazine)
- WireTap (radio program), a weekly radio program aired by the Canadian Broadcasting Corporation
- The Wiretap EP, a 2002 album by Your Enemies Friends

== See also ==
- Wiretapper, a 1955 crime drama
