= Penance Soiree =

Studio album by the Icarus Line
- Released: May 2, 2004
- Genres: Garage rock, noise rock
- Length: 53:40
- Label: V2 Records

The Icarus Line chronology
| Mono (2001) | Penance Soiree (2004) | Black Presents (2006) |

Professional ratings
Aggregate scores
| Source | Rating |
|---|---|
| Metacritic | 81/100 |
Review scores
| Source | Rating |
| AllMusic | 4.5/5 stars |
| Alternative Press | 4/5 stars |
| Drowned in Sound | 10/10 |
| Entertainment Weekly | B+ |
| Mojo | 4.5/5 stars |
| Pitchfork | 7.8/10 |
| Q | 4/5 stars |
| Spin | A− |
| Tiny Mix Tapes | 4.5/5 stars |
| Under the Radar | 7/10 |

Penance Soiree is the second full-length album released by Los Angeles band the Icarus Line. It was one of 2004's most critically acclaimed releases, and its reputation has subsequently earned praise in various publications, including the book 1001 Albums You Must Hear Before You Die.

== Release ==
Due to infighting with the band's U.S. division of their record label at the time, V2 Records, the album, which was recorded in early 2003, was not released until May 2, 2004. Disagreements and aggravations on the band's end stemmed from the label's general lack of interest and support, a nearly non-existent promotional campaign for the album, and the group's control over its artwork. The U.S. division of the record label did not invest in even one advertisement for the release, and also made the band pay for the production of their music videos out of their own pocket. The album was produced by Michael Musmanno, and then mixed by Alan Moulder. Moulder also contributed some last minute recording and engineering to the album, while mixing it in London with Aaron North and Joe Cardamone at Eden Studios in west London. The song "On the Lash" was also re-mixed for the album's inclusion by Ken Andrews, due to the band being unhappy with the original mix after returning home. The album was mastered by Howie Weinberg in New York City.

This was the last album by the Icarus Line that featured guitarist Aaron North.

== Track listing ==
1. "Up Against the Wall Motherfuckers"
2. "Spit on It"
3. "On the Lash"
4. "Caviar"
5. "Spike Island"
6. "Kiss Like Lizards"
7. "Getting Bright at Night"
8. "Big Sleep"
9. "White Devil"
10. "Meatmaker"
11. "Virgin Velcro"
12. "Seasick"
13. "Party the Baby Off"

=== Bonus Tracks ===
1. "Feed a Cat To Your Cobra
2. "Separate the Sound
3. "You Make Me Nervous
4. "Get Paid
5. "Committed to Extinction

== Personnel ==
- Joe Cardamone – Vocals
- Jeff "The Captain" Watson - Drums
- Don Devore – Bass
- Alvin DeGuzman - Guitar
- Aaron North – Guitar

=== Guest musicians ===
- Jon Wahl – Saxophone on "White Devil"
- "Dirty Lil Louis" – "Pulse"/808 on "Meatmaker"

=== Production ===
- Produced by: Mike Mussmano and The Icarus Line
- Recorded at: Sunset Sound in Hollywood, Platinum Audio in Hollywood, Wet & Dry in Highland Park, Teri Ave. in Torrance, "The Boat" in Silverlake, and Eden Studios in London
- Engineered/Recorded by: Mike Mussmano, Francis Miranda, Anthony Ianaro, Chris Reynolds. Alan Moulder, Rick Levy, Danny Kalb, and Aaron North
- Mixed by: Alan Moulder; except "On the Lash", mixed by Ken Andrews at Extasy Studio South in Hollywood
- Editing by: Roger Lian
- Mastered by: Howie Weinberg at Masterdisk in New York
- Photography by: Jason Nocito
- Layout by: Matt Sohl

== Alternate versions ==
- In the U.S., Buddyhead Records released a double-vinyl LP version of the album. This version features the original mix of "On The Lash" by Alan Moulder, as well as the originally intended album closer, "Hold The Killer Straight".
- Alternate versions of the song "Meatmaker" were included on the various formats of the album, depending on which record label/territory it was released.
- The Japanese release of the CD is the only version that resembled the band's original vision for the artwork and layout. The concept was to have the album lyrics hidden in the "wings" inside the booklet, which could only be read when a clear red CD tray was held over it. Due to lack of communication with the Japanese label, instead the inserts were printed incorrectly, and the CD tray was clear instead of red.

== Vinyl pressing information ==
- Buddyhead released a limited pressing of 500 copies. These double LPs were all pressed on multi-colored, swirled vinyl. Colors included pink, purple, red, grey, green, and red. The track-listing on the LP labels were incorrect on many copies.
- The European pressing was released by Sweet Nothing. The double LPs were pressed on black vinyl and packaged in gatefold jackets.
