= Black Presents =

EP by The Icarus Line
- Released: November 14, 2006 (US)
- Genre: Alternative rock
- Length: 12:20
- Label: Dim Mak Records

The Icarus Line chronology
Penance Soiree (2004)	Black Presents (2006)	Black Lives at the Golden Coast (2007)

Black Presents is an EP by The Icarus Line released on November 14, 2006 in support of Black Lives at the Golden Coast. As of November 15, 2006, an alternate version of track 3 "FSHN FVR" was posted on the Icarus Line's official Myspace page.

== Track listing ==
1. "Black Presents"
2. "Cut Back the Heard"
3. "FSHN FVR"
4. "Watch Your Step"
