= Black Lives at the Golden Coast =

Black Lives At The Golden Coast

Studio album by The Icarus Line
- Released: May 14, 2007
- Genre: Garage punk, noise rock, post-punk, dance punk, psych rock, post hardcore
- Length: 43:52
- Label: Dim Mak Records
- Producer: Michael Musmanno

The Icarus Line chronology
Penance Soiree (2004)	Black Lives At The Golden Coast (2007)	Wildlife (2011)

Professional ratings
Review scores
Source	Rating
Allmusic	4/5 stars

Black Lives at the Golden Coast is the third full-length release from Los Angeles noise rock band The Icarus Line. Black Lives was also the second for major label V2 Records.

== Production ==
Shortly after the long months of touring for Penance Soiree ended, the band returned to Los Angeles, penniless and completely frayed at the ends. All members went their separate ways except Joe Cardamone and Don Devore. Both recently lost their homes while being on the road and had returned to Los Angeles with no place to live. After a few weeks of crashing on couches, V2 decided it was best to put the singer-songwriter and bass player in a hotel where they could continue writing for a new record.

Around this same time when Cardamone and Devore were working on various musical projects at the Magic Castle in Hollywood, Aaron North sent an email to The Icarus Line's management notifying that he would be leaving the group. At the time it wasn't a shock considering the amount of drugs everyone was on and the fact that there had been talk of moving Don Devore into the guitar position in favor of exploring new territory stylistically.

After a couple months, and countless 8 balls later, V2 decided that it was too costly to keep the two at such a fine establishment and decided to relocate the "Toxic Twins" to a Travelodge on Vine and Melrose. A good deal of the four-track cassette demos that would later become the blueprint for Black Lives were recorded at this motel. After five months of staying in hotels and motel in their hometown of Los Angeles they two finally secured a real place to live with help from friends Ronda Doyle and Alexis Haritakis. A three-bedroom house in Los Feliz became ground zero for both Souls She Said and The Icarus Line's upcoming records. In the house was a large dining room that was re-fashioned to become a music den. Instruments and musicians of all kinds passed through, recording and hanging around the California craftsman home. Cardamone and Don shared a bachelor pad of sorts toward the back of the large house that had a separate entrance and bathroom. The Kingswell house, as it came to be known, evolved in into a refuge for an eclectic cast of like-minded individuals including members of The Mars Volta, Need New Body, The Warlocks, G. Love, Maroon 5, Ariel Pink, Beachwood Sparks, Earl Greyhound and others.

The demos that had been sketched out on four track over the months post-Penance Soiree touring were presented to US side of the record label and were met with indifference. Cardamone refused to accept any more delays and asked to be released from the contract with V2. V2 obliged the request and band was once again without a record label. In the period that followed the band continued on, recording demos at various studios around Los Angeles wherever time was cheap or free. got a copy of the rough mixes that were floating around at the time and jumped at the chance to have the band on his label, Dim Mak Records. The Icarus Line was signed to a "one-off" US deal with the label known as much for the records they put out as the parties they threw. Around this same time V2 Records UK heard these tapes and made it known that they "had made a huge mistake" by letting the band go. The label soon re-signed the group to a contract in the UK. Jeff Watson had relocated to Portland, Oregon over the course of these months but was visited by Joe and Alvin to continue writing for the new record. Eventually Jeff returned to Los Angeles to re join the group.

Recording for Black Lives began with producer Michael Musmanno at Sunset Sound in Los Angeles and ended in various studios in New York City. The line-up consisted of Alvin Deguzman on bass, Jeff Watson on drums, Don Devore on guitar and Joe Cardamone on vocals and guitars. During the year and a half-long process of the recording it became more evident that Joe Cardamone and Don Devore had different visions of where the musical vision of the band was headed. This led to inner turmoil during the sessions and ultimately Don leaving the project before its completion. Black Lives was mixed by Dave McNair at Avatar in New York City, the same studio where David Bowie had recorded Let's Dance and favorite spot of Bob Clearmountain. The record was mastered by Howie Wienberg at Masterdisk in New York City.

Shortly after the release of Black Lives at the Golden Coast, V2 Records went under, leaving the band without financial backing. The band's album out only for a couple weeks was released by a record label that was near its end and never received a proper push. Despite this situation the band continued to tour in support of the record. Black Lives is characterized by dark, disjointed themes similar in spirit to "There's a Riot Goin' on" by Sly Stone and "Flowers of Romance" by PiL. The record documented a time of complete chaos and self-destruction for The Icarus Line. For better or worse, Black Lives at the Golden Coast brings the listener in to the disappointments and freedoms of living under the radar.

== Track listing ==
All tracks are written by The Icarus Line.

No.	Title	Length
1.	"Black Presents"	3:35
2.	"Fshn Fvr"	3:20
3.	"Gets Paid"	3:23
4.	"Slayer"	3:49
5.	"Sick Bitch"	1:47
6.	"Amber Alert"	4:10
7.	"Black Lives at the Golden Coast"	3:12
8.	"Frankfurt Smile"	3:41
9.	"Victory Gardens"	3:50
10.	"Committed to Extinction"	2:32
11.	"Golden Rush"	2:36
12.	"Kingdom"	7:57

== Personnel ==
- Joe Cardamone – Vocals
- Don Devore - Guitar
- Jeff "The Captain" Watson - Drums
- Alvin DeGuzman - Bass
- Produced & recorded by The Icarus Line & Michael Musmanno at Sunset Sound
- Mastered by Howie Wienberg at Masterdisk
- Mixed by Dave McNair at Avatar Studios
