= Lovetown =

Lovetown or Love Town may refer to

- Lovetown (album), a 1988 album by Stephen Cummings
- "Love Town", a 1983 single by Booker Newberry III
- "Lovetown" (song), a 1994 single by Peter Gabriel included in the sound-track of the film Philadelphia
- "Lovetown", a song by Sneaky Sound System from their 2011 album From Here to Anywhere
- Lovetown Tour, a 1989/1990 tour by Irish rock band U2
- Lovetown, USA, a 2012/13 American reality documentary television series

== See also ==
- Love Township, Vermilion County, Illinois
- "Love This Town"
- Lovetone
