= Hot Rod (disambiguation) =

A Hot rod is a typically American car with a large engine modified for linear speed.

Hot Rod may also refer to:

== People and characters ==
- Hot Rod (rapper) (born 1985), American rapper and recording artist from Phoenix, Arizona

=== As a nickname ===
- Hot Rod Hundley (1934–2015), American basketball player and sportscaster
- John "Hot Rod" Williams (1962–2015), American basketball player
- Roddy Piper or Hot Rod (1954–2015), professional wrestler
- Hot Rod Fuller, participant in the 2008 NHRA Powerade Drag Racing Series season
- Rodrigo Blankenship (born 1997), American football placekicker

=== Fictional characters ===
- Hot Rod (Transformers), several fictional robot superhero characters in the Transformers robot superhero franchise

== Film ==
- Hot Rod (1950 film), a 1950 American drama film
- Hot Rod (1979 film), an American film
- Hot Rod (2007 film), a film starring Andy Samberg
- Hot Rods, a 1953 animated short film

== Music ==
- Hot rod music, a subgenre of surf music
- "Hot Rod", a 2000 song by Peaches from The Teaches of Peaches

== Transportation and vehicular ==
- Hot Rod (magazine), an American car magazine
- Hot Rods (oval racing), a British motorsport

== Other uses ==
- Hot Rod (video game), a 1988 arcade game by Sega
- Bowling Green Hot Rods, the Full A team of the Tampa Bay Rays
- Hot Rod Condoms, a U.S. condom brand
- Hot Rod, a Canadian meat snack manufactured by Schneiders, a division of Maple Leaf Foods

== See also ==
- Rod (disambiguation)
- Hot (disambiguation)
