= ScienceAlert =

Science magazine

- Editor: Peter Dockrill
- Former editors: Julian Cribb (2005 – 2015)
- Categories: Popular science
- Frequency: Daily
- First issue: 2004
- Company: ScienceAlert Pty Ltd
- Country: Australia
- Based in: Canberra
- Language: English
- Website: www.sciencealert.com

ScienceAlert is an independently run online publication and news source that publishes articles featuring scientific research, discoveries, and outcomes. The site was founded in 2004 by Julian Cribb, a science writer, to aggregate research findings from Australian universities, and it expanded in 2006 when ex-Microsoft programmer Chris Cassella took on the project of developing the website. It has readership that ranges from 11.5m to 26.5m per month. Kate Mallord has been CEO since 2024. In March 2024 the site was listed by Press Gazette as one of the fastest growing news sites globally.

== History ==
Science communicator Julian Cribb founded ScienceAlert in 2004. The website was born out of his "concern at the lack of information available about what Australians and New Zealanders achieve in science". Chris Cassella, a former programmer for Microsoft, joined the site in order to develop new web tools. He took on this work as part of a master's degree thesis in science communication at Australia National University, where Cribb was a professor. Initially, the focus of ScienceAlert was twofold: "to both publicise Australasian scientific outcomes more widely and to encourage Australasian research institutions and funding agencies to share more of their achievements by providing a free outlet for them to do so". Cassella is credited with bringing the site to social media, starting the ScienceAlert Facebook page in 2007. By 2011, the page had attracted a significant following among young people, reaching one million followers by 2012. By 2020, the page had slightly more than nine million followers.

In 2012, ScienceAlert received a grant from Inspiring Australia, a government initiative aimed at engaging "people who may not have had previous access to or interest in science-communication activities". Although the website began as a project to aggregate research findings and outcomes from Australian universities, by 2019 the focus of the site had shifted toward presenting popular science to a wider audience. The shift toward mass appeal news on social media has met with some criticism. (See Controversy and criticism section, below)

In July 2019, reinforcing the site's commitment to fact-checking, ScienceAlert announced a joint partnership with Metafact. ScienceAlert republishes selected expert answers from the Metafact community across the site's multiple digital channels. ScienceAlert is owned by ScienceAlert Pty Ltd., a privately held company owned by Chris Cassella.

According to its site, ScienceAlert does not run sponsored articles nor is it affiliated with other companies or institutions. As of 2025, ScienceAlert engages more than 25 million readers per month.

== Editorial staff ==
In addition to Cassella and Mallord, ScienceAlert's editorial staff is headed by Peter Dockrill, who now manages more than half a dozen contributing science journalists to produce the site's news. Cribb concluded his role as editor at ScienceAlert in 2015. From 2017-2024, Fiona MacDonald was CEO of ScienceAlert, with Cassella acting as COO/CFO. Prior to this role, MacDonald had worked with the news site for more than a decade as an editor and then the director of content. She's now listed as a co-founder of the site. In 2024, Kate Mallord, formerly of Meta and LinkedIn, was named CEO. According to The Brilliant, the editorial team has doubled since 2017.

== Format ==
As of August 2023, ScienceAlert had the following sections: Space, Environment, Tech, Physics, Opinion, Health, Humans, Nature and Society. Readers could read the trending news or the latest news from the homepage.
