= Radio Vago =

- Origin: Los Angeles, California, US
- Genres: Post-punk
- Years active: 2002–2016
- Labels: Buddyhead

Radio Vago were a band from Los Angeles, California.

This group began mainly from the effort of Olivia Parriott, a Los Angeles native, guitarist and keyboard player in early 2000. CalArts student and vocalist Andrienne Pearson joined forces with guitarist Jen Gillaspy, a native of Indiana who relocated to the West Coast. The original drummer was Parriott's brother while the band played at frat parties and campus showcases. Jed Parriott was soon replaced by drummer Jenny Vassilatos and Radio Vago performed its first show at The Garage. Initially a noise rock group, the band added former Sweet 16 bass player Nicole Fiorentino. Learning as they went along, the band members drew influence from Devo, Joy Division, L7 and Smashing Pumpkins among others. In 2002, Radio Vago released its debut effort, a split 7-inch recording with The Kitchen Solution. Another 7-inch split with Squab was also released that year. In November 2002, Radio Vago released its debut E.P., Black And White Photo Enterprise on Buddyhead Records. In 2004 they parted ways with original singer Adrienne Pearson who was replaced by Mire Molnar. The band recorded a full-length record which was produced by Omar Rodríguez-López of experimental rock band The Mars Volta, but the band broke up prior to its release, and it was only released for download.

Radio Vago performed with various groups including The Mars Volta, Yeah Yeah Yeahs, The Distillers, The Breeders, Tracy And The Plastics, The Need, The Fallen and The Icarus Line.

== Discography ==
- Black & White Photo Enterprise (2002)
- The Kitchen/Radio Vago (2002)
- Squab/Radio Vago (2002)
- Radio Vago (2006)
