= Mono (The Icarus Line album) =

2001 studio album by the Icarus Line

Studio album by The Icarus Line
- Released: May 8, 2001
- Genre: Garage punk, noise rock, post-hardcore, hard rock
- Label: Crank!, Buddyhead

The Icarus Line chronology
Red And Black Attack (1998)	Mono (2001)	Three Jesus Songs (2003)

Professional ratings
Review scores
Source	Rating
Allmusic	3/5 stars
Kerrang!	5/5 stars
NME	7/10

Mono was the first album from The Icarus Line. It was originally released May 8, 2001 in the U.S. by Crank! Records on CD, and Buddyhead on LP.

The album was recorded throughout two separate sessions in 2000. The first of these were conducted at the studio "Rotund Rascal" on Lankershim Blvd. in North Hollywood. This initial attempt at recording the entire album with Mark Trombino as engineer, ultimately resulted in only the completion of drums, bass, Alvin's guitars, and about half of Aaron's guitar tracks. In a bold move, the band fired Trombino, and resumed work over a month later with Alex Newport at Doug Messenger's Studio in North Hollywood, on Vineland Avenue. Having recorded albums such as At The Drive-In's before at this same studio, Newport was comfortable in moving very quickly there with the band. The album, being recorded onto tape, as opposed to Pro Tools (as was customary for most bands of the time) resulted in the majority of the album being "first takes". The album was also mixed quickly by the band with Newport at Messenger's Studio. It was then mastered by Mark Chalecki in the Capitol Records building.

Upon its eventual release, the album gave the band a significant push in popularity worldwide. It was included on many "Best Albums of 2001" lists in various publications. In support of the album, the band toured with The Dillinger Escape Plan, Yeah Yeah Yeahs, and Cave In, among many others.

Alternative versions of the album were licensed and released by Sweet Nothing in Europe, Ugly Boy Records in Australia, and Victor in Japan. The Japanese CD release included "Kill Cupid With A Nail File" as a bonus track. Sweet Nothing issued two singles for the album in the UK. "Feed A Cat To Your Cobra" came first, and included tracks recorded at the band's first BBC John Peel radio session. Among these was a cover of The Stooges song, "1970". The second single, for "Love Is Happiness", included a re-recorded version of the song, as well as tracks recorded during the band's second BBC John Peel radio session. These recordings, along with a cover of the Spacemen 3 tune, "Losing Touch With My Mind", marked the appearance of the band's new drummer, Troy Petrey.

== Track listing ==
1. "Love Is Happiness"
2. "You Make Me Nervous"
3. "L.O.S.T."
4. "Enemies In High Places"
5. "In Lieu"
6. "Feed A Cat To Your Cobra"
7. "Oh Faithless"
8. "Please Fire Me"
9. "Keep Your Eyes Peeled"
10. "Best Two Out Of Three"
11. "Rape Of The Holy Mother"
12. "SPMC"

== Personnel ==
- Joe Cardamone – Vocals
- Jeff "The Captain" Watson – Drums
- Aaron North – Guitar
- Alvin DeGuzman – Guitar
- Lance Arnao – Bass

== Production ==
- Mark Trombino, Alex Newport – Engineering/Recording
- Alex Newport – Mixing
- Mark Chalecki – Mastering
- Shelby Cinca – Layout Assembly

== Vinyl pressing information ==
- The 12-inch vinyl version of “Mono” was pressed just once, in 2001. Only 1,110 copies were pressed and released by Buddyhead. The CD version was originally released by Crank! Records in the U.S., after which the album was quickly bought back by the band, and then re-pressed and re-released on Buddyhead. These second, and further CD pressings, had slightly altered artwork, including an alternate font on the cover. Seeing as how the LP was pressed at the time of the original CD release, this explains why the covers for Buddyhead's 5th release on both CD and LP don't match.

Vinyl pressing info (excluding test presses):
1 on clear red and dark purple mixed vinyl
2 on white vinyl
3 on dark purple vinyl
4 on marble vinyl
100 on clear vinyl (some of these sold as “tour editions” with different jackets)
100 on light purple vinyl
100 on clear red vinyl
400 on solid red vinyl
400 on red and black mixed vinyl
