= Jason DeCorse =

Background information
- Birth name: Jason DeCorse
- Born: 16 January 1974; Yuma, Arizona, U.S.
- Genres: Rock, metal, blues, country, new wave, alternative rock
- Occupation(s): Guitarist, Composer, Studio Musician
- Instrument(s): Guitar, Bass guitar
- Years active: 1974 - Present

Jason DeCorse (born January 16, 1974) is an American guitarist, singer, and songwriter.

== Background ==
Jason DeCorse is of the Quechan Indian nation raised in Yuma, Arizona. He started playing guitar when he was 12 the summer before 7th grade. His influences were his dad, Jimi Hendrix, and Michael Jackson. Propaganda Child was his first band in 1994.

Since the early 1990s, he's been a regular member of Greyhound Soul (fronted by Joe Pena) which has achieved critical acclaim regionally. Other members include big Duane Hollis on bass, and many drummers including Allen Anderson and Winston Watson. Simultaneously around 94-96 he was with Funky Bonz and Spacefish up until 1998.

Anything’s Good was a spinoff of Propaganda Child in Tucson when the singer Chris Kabisch and manager Scott Marconi moved to Los Angeles to meet up with their buddy Josh Atchley (Nynex, I Will Never Be The Same)

Jet Set was the updated LA version of this collection of musicians in 1998 led by Chris Kabisch on vocals, adding Steve Carlson (Stevie C.) on bass, Chad Stewart on drums, and Tim ‘Future’ McDonald on keys. Stevie C. broke his hand accidentally so Tim enlisted his fellow band member Josh Curtis to fill in on bass from the Daniel Cartier band. By this time Danny Nordahl had nicknamed Jason ‘Super J’ due to his high flying acrobatic guitar skills performing gigs for Pretty Ugly Club at the Dragonfly.

The fellas all agreed that Super J was a real talent that Jet Set practice at Hollywood Rehearsal with Loraine at the front desk. Jason showed up with a 12-string Danelectro guitar and after a few notes there were fast friends. Jason joined forces with Josh to form the band Plastic Dog in 2000. Rod Dyer created the Plastic Dog logo the same year. They are recording an album of new material from Plastic Dog in the summer of 2023.

In 2003, Arista Records signed the band Lo Mass Republic, to a recording contract. The band featured Jason on guitar, Jesse Glick as lead singer, Hoss Wright on drums, Corbin Long on keys, and Steve Corduroy on bass. Their debut album was recorded in Seattle by Rick Parashar and mixed by Jack Joseph Puig at Ocean Way but the record was never released. The band then joined forces in 2007 and hired John Travis to record and produce their independent album Poisoned Heart Machines.

From 2006-2012 Jason joined as guitarist for the LA band The Icarus Line with singer Joe Cardamone, bassist Alvin DeGuzman, guitarist James Striff, and drummers Jeff Watson and Ben Hallet. They toured the U.K., Europe, Scandinavia, and Canada supporting Wolf Mother. The band also toured with Against Me, the Cult, the Lemonheads, the Slits, and Killing Joke.

From 2007-2010, Jason also performed and recorded with The Jimi Homeless Experience, a comedy rock/parody band.

Jason has performed and recorded with many other musicians, including Kathy Valentine, Clem Burke, Abby Travis, Ian Astbury, Motochrist, Alana Sweetwater, Jet Set, and several others.

In 2014, Jason joined Godspeed McQueen, a punk/rock'n'roll tribute band located in Solana Beach CA with a deep underground following. He also joined Dark Alley Dogs on lead guitar since 2017. Currently Jason teaches music at Rockademy, a music school located in North San Diego County.

== Discography ==
=== with Greyhound Soul ===
- "Alma de Galgo" (2001) LP, CD
- "Down" (2004) LP, CD
- "Freaks" (2005) LP, CD
- "Tonight and Every Night" (2007) LP, CD

=== with Lo Mass Republic ===
- "Lo Mass Republic" (2003) LP, CD
- "Poisoned Heart Machines" (2007) LP, CD

=== with Alana Sweetwater ===
- "Alana Sweetwater" (2007) LP, CD

=== with The Jimi Homeless Experience ===
- "Are You Homeless?" (2007) LP, CD
- "Band of Junkys" (2009) CD Single

=== with Plastic Dog ===
- "Bean" (2006) LP, CD
- "High Noon" (2008) EP, CD
- "101 Hollywood Nights: Demos & Outtakes '98-'08" (2008) 6-CD box set

=== with The Icarus Line ===
- "Wildlife" (2010) LP, CD
- "Live in London" (2012) LP only
