= Your Enemies Friends =

Hardcore rock band from America

- Origin: California, United States
- Genres: Post-hardcore; Punk rock
- Years active: 2001–present
- Label: Buddyhead Records
- Members: Ronnie Washburn (vocals, guitar); Allen Watke (guitar); Jennifer Goodridge (keyboards, vocals); James C. Burton (bass); Luis Carlos-Contreras (drums)
- Past members: Aska Matsumiya (2001-2004); Dana James (2001-2004)

Your Enemies Friends is a post-hardcore rock band that formed in late 2001 in Los Angeles, California.

They have shared the stage with bands such as ...And You Will Know Us by the Trail of Dead, Blonde Redhead, The Icarus Line, TV on the Radio, The Promise Ring, and The Mars Volta.

After enlisting the help of producer Alex Newport, Your Enemies Friends immediately began recording The Wiretap EP. Picked up by Buddyhead Records a month later, The Wiretap EP was re-released to much acclaim in underground circles. Punknews.org described the EP as "brilliant" and gave it a 4.5 star rating.

"The Wiretap is one of the most stellar and impressive debuts our ears have ever experienced” – Kerrang! Magazine.

In the Spring of 2002, Your Enemies Friends began the touring schedule that would keep them out for the next 19 months. Your Enemies Friends started out by sharing the stage with the likes of Jimmy Eat World, Blonde Redhead, The Promise Ring, the Mars Volta, The Icarus Line, and Hella. Followed up by extensive tours throughout the United States, Canada and Europe with the Donnas, Pretty Girls Make Graves, and Superdrag.

"The Wiretap EP was basically a demo tape that got out of hand and kept us out on tour for a year and a half. And after touring that long off songs I wrote the first month of being in this band, we decided we were ready to make a record." – Ronnie Washburn.

Recorded in the summer of 2003 with the aid of Cameron Webb (Beck, Jimi Hendrix, Danzig) and Curtis Mathewson (Motörhead, Train), Your Enemies Friends’ self-produced full-length, You Are Being Videotaped was released in March 2004. The disc saw the band's paranoid urgency and schizophrenic dynamics further highlighted by adding string arrangements and electronic elements.

2004 started out with a full US and Canadian tour with The Dillinger Escape Plan and The Locust, followed by a US tour with Midtown and Armor for Sleep. A Scandinavian tour including the Øya Festival in Oslo, Norway and a headlining US tour with Read Yellow.

Your Enemies Friends was named the House of Blues/Sirius’ Emerging Artist of the month, nominated by the Diesel:U:Music Radio Awards as Best New Artist, and Your Enemies Friends have been on the CMJ Top 200 charts for eight weeks.

As of 2011, Your Enemies Friends are no longer touring or recording. Washburn and Goodridge play in Seaspin, and have released one EP entitled Reverser.

== Trivia ==
When they recorded their first full-length record You Are Being Videotaped they asked fans to bring dill pickles for them to their shows.

== Discography ==
=== Albums ===
- You Are Being Videotaped (2004, Buddyhead Records)

=== Singles and EPs ===
- The Wiretap EP (2002, Buddyhead Records)
