= Jubilee (band) =

American indie rock band from Hollywood, California

- Origin: Hollywood, California, United States
- Genres: Rock; Indie rock Alternative rock
- Years active: 2007–2008
- Labels: White/Grey/Black
- Past members: Aaron North; Michael Shuman; Troy "Boy" Petrey; Tony Bevilacqua; Jenni Tarma

Jubilee was an American Indie rock band from Hollywood, California. The band was formed in 2007 by Aaron North (vocals, guitar) and consisted of Tony Bevilacqua (guitar), Jenni Tarma (bass), and Troy "Boy" Petrey (drums).

According to an early press release, Jubilee's sound is "something like The Replacements, The Stone Roses, Neil Young, Blur, Jane's Addiction, Bob Dylan, Creedence Clearwater Revival, and The Verve, all sliced ‘n diced together quite nicely".

Jubilee's discography consists of two limited release singles via North's Buddyhead Records. They released the “Rebel Hiss” single on January 21, 2008 on 7-inch vinyl, CD, and a limited edition "tour-version" 7-inch. Their second single, "In With the Out Crowd", was released in Fall 2008 on 7-inch and CD. The band has stated a general dislike for both releases, as well as constant frustration stemming from people assuming that both releases are EPs, instead of, "a bunch of songs that just simply aren't as good as the ones chosen for the album. They're throwaways." There are no plans of re-pressing either release once the remaining copies are sold due to tension between members of the band and the record label.

Jubilee's next release was a collection of live recordings, all of which were recorded in North's home. These sessions took place over the course of 2009. Their subsequently solemn and casual approach to these recordings and the resulting sound had also been described by band members as a conscious effort to get the absolute furthest away that they could from how their album was created. Almost all of the music for these sessions was performed on acoustic guitars, with an absence of both drums and bass guitar. Finishing with more material than they had intended, an EP titled After the Crash ultimately released soon after and was only available to those who subscribed to the "Jubilee Digital Music Service." The 7-inch vinyl EP was released through a new label North started, White/Grey/Black, to be mailed directly to subscribers and contained directions for accessing MP3, WAV, and FLAC digital formats of the EP along with bonus tracks via Topspin.

== Discography ==
- "Rebel Hiss" (Single, 2008)
- "In With the Out Crowd" (Single, 2008)
- Live In Belfast (2009)
- After the Crash (2009)
