= Julian Cribb =

British-Australian Science writer

Julian Cribb AM FTSE
- Education: University of Western Australia
- Occupations: Science writer, author, activist
- Children: Alex, Jasmine, Olivia
- Writing career
- Language: English
- Genre: Non-fiction
- Subjects: science, agriculture, food, mining, energy, the environment
- Website: juliancribb.net

Julian Cribb is a British-Australian author and science writer, known for his extensive contributions in the fields of science, agriculture, food, mining, energy, and the environment. Cribb worked in various editorial roles, advisory positions, and leadership roles in professional bodies. He is known for his prolific output, including over 12 books and more than 9000 articles. His literary focus primarily revolves around addressing existential risks to humanity, with notable works such as "The Coming Famine," "Surviving the 21st Century," "Food or War," and "How to Fix a Broken Planet."

== Early life and education ==
Cribb grew up in the UK was educated at Radley College.

== Career ==
=== Journalism ===
In 1966, he migrated to Australia and started working as a reporter to a local newspaper.

Cribb edited six newspapers and magazines, and received over thirty journalism awards. He moved to science communication and became the director of national awareness for the Australian national scientific organisation, CSIRO.

=== Advocacy ===
Cribb is an outspoken advocate for adopting global solutions to the ten megathreats described in his books, in ways that make none of them worse. He argues these threats constitute the greatest existential emergency humans have ever faced in their million years on the planet. Attempting to solve these threats one at a time will not work, he warns.

In his books, Cribb also calls for:

1. a stewards of the earth program to rewild and repair damaged natural ecosystems globally;
2. a new human right not to be poisoned;
3. an earth standard currency;
4. a global truth commission;
5. the right of all humans to inhabit a non-poisoned world; and
6. a world plan to save humanity.

In a 2018 interview to Vision.org, Cribb said that humanity faces multiple existential threats, which require holistic solutions rather than isolated fixes. He advocated for collective action, stressing the importance of political engagement and consumer choices in shaping global outcomes. Cribb stressed the disproportionate investment in warfare over essential needs like food security and urged a shift towards prioritizing peace and sustainability. Calling for a reevaluation of societal beliefs and values, Cribb urged the exercise of both wisdom and foresight in addressing looming crises.

During the same year, Cribb gave an interview to Nora Young for her show Spark on CBC Radio One. Cribb discussed the centralized nature of the global food distribution system and highlighted how a few corporations control the food trade. He described the detrimental effects of this centralization, including poor diets, vulnerable food chains, and environmental degradation caused by unsustainable farming practices. Cribb also talked about food waste at various stages of the supply chain, from transportation to consumer habits, pointing out the inefficiencies and lost nutrients. He also outlined his vision for a sustainable food system, which includes regenerative farming, urban food production, and deep ocean aquaculture.

==== Council for the Human Future ====
In 2019 he co-founded the Council for the Human Future to raise global awareness of the growing existential crisis, comprising ten catastrophic risks, and help devise solutions to them all. He is a strong proponent of an Earth System Treaty, a universal agreement by all of humanity to act to save both our civilization and the world that sustains it.

== Bibliography ==
=== Select books ===
- Cribb, Julian. How to Fix a Broken Planet. Cambridge University Press, 2023.
- Cribb, Julian. Earth Detox: How and why we must clean up our planet. Cambridge University Press, 2021.
- Cribb, Julian. Food or War. Cambridge University Press, 2019.
- Cribb, Julian. Surviving the 21st century: Humanity's ten great challenges and how we can overcome them. Springer, 2016.
- Cribb, Julian. Poisoned planet: How constant exposure to man-made chemicals is putting your life at risk. Allen & Unwin, 2014.
- Cribb, Julian. The Coming Famine: the global food crisis and what we can do to avoid it. Univ of California Press, 2010.
- Smith, Mark Stafford, and Julian Cribb. Dry times: blueprint for a red land. CSIRO publishing, 2009.
- Hartomo, Tjempaka, and Julian Cribb. Sharing knowledge: A guide to effective science communication. CSIRO Publishing, 2002.
- Cribb, Julian, and Marie Lynch. The White Death. Sydney: Angus & Robertson, 1996.

=== Select journal articles ===
- Naidu, Ravi, Bhabananda Biswas, Ian R. Willett, Julian Cribb, Brajesh Kumar Singh, C. Paul Nathanail, Frederic Coulon et al. "Chemical pollution: A growing peril and potential catastrophic risk to humanity." Environment International 156 (2021): 106616.
- Chambers, Ian, Jeremy Russell‐Smith, Robert Costanza, Julian Cribb, Sean Kerins, Melissa George, Glenn James et al. "Australia's north, Australia's future: A vision and strategies for sustainable economic, ecological and social prosperity in northern Australia." Asia & the Pacific Policy Studies 5, no. 3 (2018): 615–640.
- Fisher, N. I., A. J. Lee, and J. H. J. Cribb. "A scientific approach to monitoring public perceptions of scientific issues." International Journal of Science Education, Part B 3, no. 1 (2013): 25–51.
- Cribb, Julian HJ. "Food security: What are the priorities?." Food security 3, no. 2 (2011): 123–125.
- Cribb, Julian. "New name needed for unwise Homo?." Nature 476, no. 7360 (2011): 282-282.
- Fisher, N. I., J. H. J. Cribb, and A. J. Peacock. "Reading the public mind: a novel approach to improving the adoption of new science and technology." Australian Journal of Experimental Agriculture 47, no. 11 (2008): 1–10.
- Cribb, Julian. "The origin of acquired immune deficiency syndrome: can science afford to ignore it?." Philosophical Transactions of the Royal Society of London. Series B: Biological Sciences 356, no. 1410 (2001): 935–938.
- Cribb, J. "Farewell to the heartland." The Australian Magazine (1994): 12–13.
- Cribb, Julian. Australian agriculture: The complete reference on rural industry. Morescope, 1991.
