= Slave Vows =

Studio album by The Icarus Line
- Released: August 6, 2013
- Genres: Garage punk, noise rock, post-hardcore, hard rock, psych rock
- Label: Agitated

The Icarus Line chronology
Wildlife (2011)	Slave Vows (2013)

Professional ratings
Aggregate scores
Source	Rating
Metacritic	83/100
Review scores
Source	Rating
Drowned in Sound	9/10
MusicOMH	4/5 stars
PopMatters	9/10
The Quietus	Positive
Slant Magazine	4.5/5 stars
Sputnikmusic	4.1/5

Slave Vows is the fifth studio album by Los-Angeles hardcore punk band The Icarus Line. It was released in August 2013 under Agitated Records.

== Track listing ==
No.	Title	Length
1.	"Dark Circles"	10:57
2.	"Don't Let Me Save Your Soul"	4:15
3.	"Marathon Man"	6:48
4.	"Dead Body"	7:51
5.	"No Money Music"	1:57
6.	"City Job"	5:04
7.	"Laying Down For The Man"	5:00
8.	"Rats Ass"	3:11
