= Are You Homeless? =

EP by The Jimi Homeless Experience
- Released: 2007
- Genre: Comedy rock; parody
- Length: 26:06
- Label: MK-ULTRA RECORDS
- Producer: Jon Kinyon

Are You Homeless? is an EP from The Jimi Homeless Experience. It contains seven tracks of parody songs written by Jon Kinyon, each one lampooning a well known Jimi Hendrix hit. The CD was officially released on August 23, 2007, the 40th anniversary of The Jimi Hendrix Experience's first LP, Are You Experienced. The album cover itself is a parody of this influential album.

== Production ==
- Produced by Jon Kinyon
- Recorded and engineered by Jeff Gross, June '07 - August '07 at Studio 144, Los Angeles, CA
- Mixed by Jon Kinyon and Jeff Gross, August '07
- Mastered by Michael Edmonds, August '07 at MK-ULTRA STUDIOS, Burbank, CA
- Art design by Jon Kinyon
- Graphics by Big Tasty

== Studio musicians ==
- Josh Curtis -- vocals, bass guitar;
- Jason DeCorse -- guitar;
- Kevin Zelch -- drums.

== Track listing ==
The track listing of parodies are as follows:

Track	Title	Length	(Style) Parody of	Description
1	"Purple Veins"	3:31	"Purple Haze"	The lament of a man hopelessly addicted to street narcotics. He knows they are a source of his misery, anger and confused state but they are also capable of providing him an escape - however short lived.
2	"Pliers"	2:56	"Fire"	In Hendrix' time, just singing about wanting to have sex with someone (see: Fire) was considered taboo. 40 years later nothing seems shocking, even this song expressing pure sexual deviancy seems tame compared to some popular hit songs today.
3	"Hey Bro"	4:20	"Hey Joe"	A man gets evicted from his apartment, beats up his landlady and winds up on the run from the cops.
4	"Boxy Lady"	3:43	"Foxy Lady"	A homeless man expresses his affection for a homeless lady who collects and lives in cardboard boxes. Though he shares his panhandled change with her she still ignores his advances. He is relentless nonetheless.
5	"The Wind Cries Larry"	3:42	"The Wind Cries Mary"	A homeless man surveys his surroundings and reveals his pessimism on love/marriage, his distrust of the police and his belief that nature is ultimately out to do him in.
6	"Hobo Child (No Deposit No Return)"	4:45	"Voodoo Child (Slight Return)"	Even deep down in the gutter, men are able to find pride of which to boast. In this case, it is the actual condition of being down and out. Hoboes (as opposed to homeless people) are traditionally romanticized in literature and sometimes even in popular culture - this label actually becomes a badge of honor to some.
7	"Are You Homeless?"	3:44	"Are You Experienced"	An unfortunate person, new to the streets, is welcomed and educated by a man who has been around for some time.
