= Punch (band) =

American punk rock band

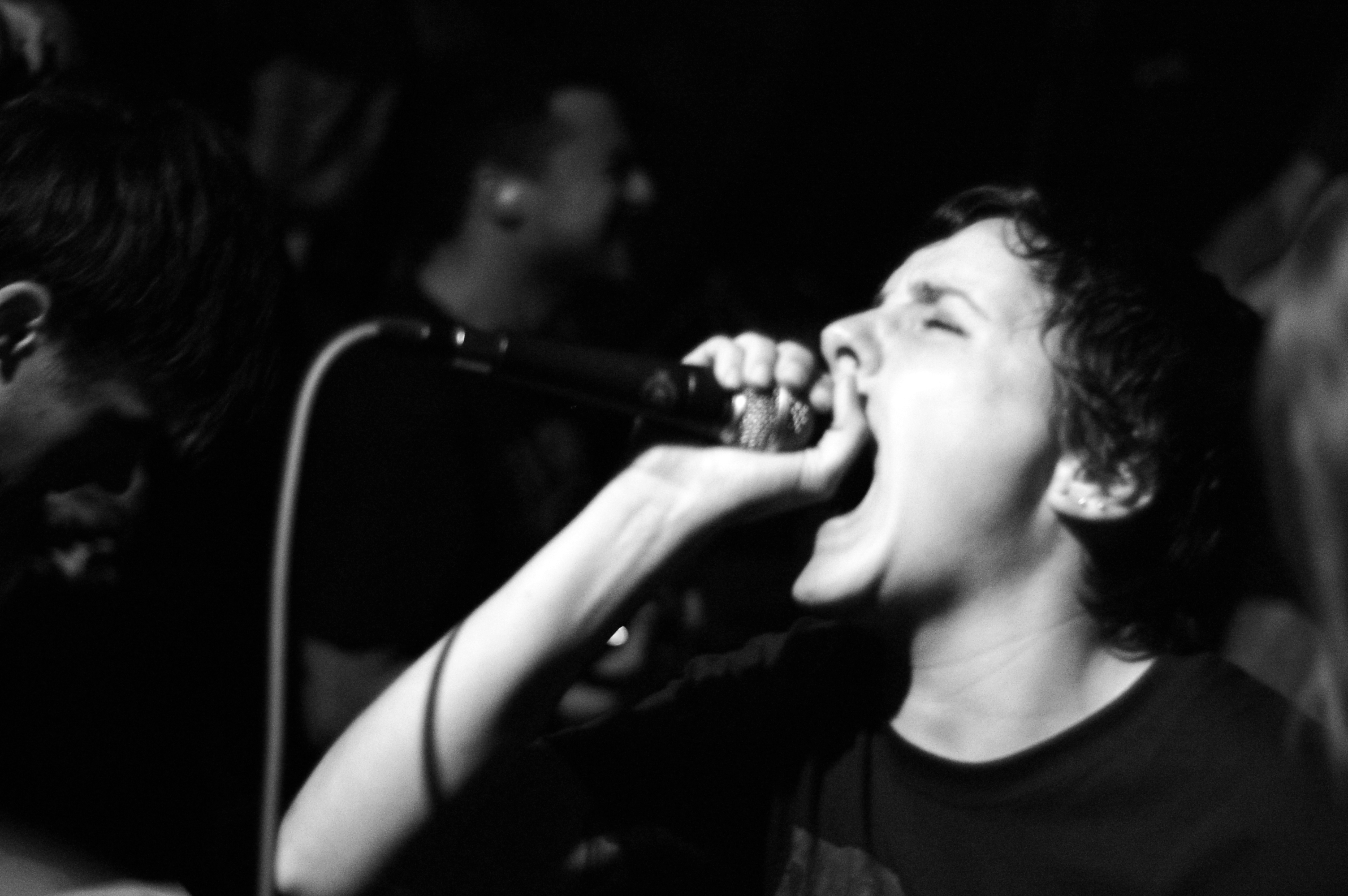
- Former vocalist Meghan O'Neil performing live in 2011

Background information
- Origin: San Francisco, California, U.S.
- Genres: Hardcore punk • thrashcore • powerviolence
- Years active: 2006–2014 (hiatus)
- Labels: Deathwish, 625 Thrashcore, Discos Huelga, Assault
- Spinoffs: Super Unison, Know Secrets
- Spinoff of: Loma Prieta, Rosenbombs, I Wrote Haikus About Cannibalism in Your Yearbook
- Members: Brian Stern; Giacomo Zatti; Keith Bartolomei; Valeriano Saucedo
- Past members: Dan Afrika; Freddie Ruíz; Jeff; Meghan O'Neil

Punch is an American punk rock band that formed in 2006. The San Francisco-based band's lyrics discuss topics such as veganism, feminism and addiction, and also shares members with the bands Loma Prieta and Living Eyes. Punch co-released several EPs and LPs through local indie labels 625 Thrashcore and Discos Huelga before signing to Jacob Bannon's (Converge, Supermachiner) label Deathwish Inc. in 2011.

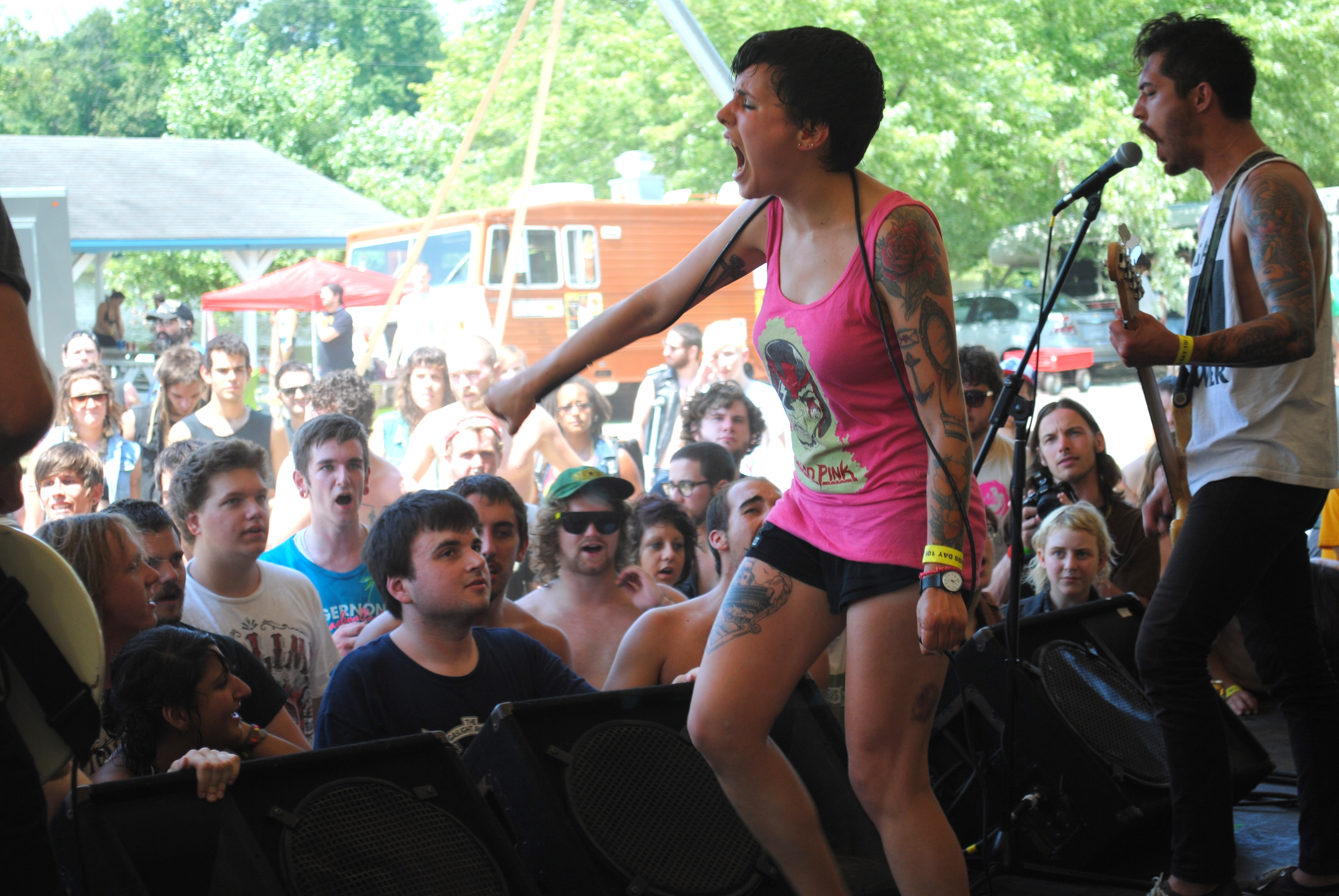
Live at Best Friends Day, 2011

Punch guitarist Keeth began writing for the band's third studio album in late 2013, and the full group came together in early 2014. Punch entered the studio with Jack Shirley (Deafheaven, Joyce Manor) and recorded a new album in three days in March/April 2014. Vocalist Meghan O'Neil described the band's mindset while writing the album: "This may sound weird, but we came into this one differently by saying to ourselves 'this is going to be our best record.' Just believing that and putting the extra time in to practice and tweak the songs. I also slightly changed my vocal approach and was happy with the results." The album, titled They Don't Have to Believe, was released on August 19, 2014, through Deathwish. O'Neil said the title was derived from Kathleen Hanna's (Bikini Kill, Le Tigre) speech at the end of the 2013 documentary film The Punk Singer. She said the title is "an ode to being unapologetically yourself," and in the film's speech, Hanna said: "she doesn't expect everyone to understand or believe in feminism or her personal battle with illness, but they should have to stay out of her way." They Don't Have to Believe was well received by music critics, and peaked at number 50 on Billboard's Top Heatseekers chart.

Only a couple of weeks after the release of They Don't Have to Believe, O'Neil left the band in September 2014. After Punch, O'Neil joined a new band called Super Unison (named after a Drive Like Jehu song) in late 2014, and released a self-titled EP in May 2015.

== Discography ==
=== Studio albums ===
- Punch (2009)
- Push Pull (2010)
- They Don't Have to Believe (2014)

=== EPs ===
- Eyeless (2008)
- Nothing Lasts (2011)
