= Mean Reds =

Arizona-based rock band

Formed in 2003 in Tucson, Arizona, United States, The Mean Reds released one full-length LP, three EPs and a split album (with DVD) with notable Los Angeles, California rock band Wires On Fire. Featuring Anthony Anzalone, Wilson Snider, Nick Letson, Byron Hambacher, and Kyle Gutiérrez, the band relocated to Silver Lake, Los Angeles, California in 2004. Known for their raucous live performances and their affinity for Disney Channel's Hilary Duff, as well as actress Audrey Hepburn (whose film Breakfast at Tiffany's spawned the band's name), the band embarked on several regional tours before breaking up on October 31, 2005.

== Discography ==
- Destination Imagination (2003)
- Some Sort Of Adventure Through History (2004)
- The Mean Reds/Wires On Fire Split (2005)
- Together At Last, And This Is Our Wedding (2005)
- Halloween LP (2005)

== Line-up ==
- Anthony Anzalone - vocals
- Byron Hambacher - guitar
- Nick Letson - keyboards/guitar
- Kyle Gutiérrez - bass
- Wilson Snider - drums
- Miles Bartlett - guitar
