= Food or War =

2019 book by Julian Cribb

- Cover
- Author: Julian Cribb
- Subject: Earth and environmental sciences, environmental policy, economics and law, politics and international relations, international relations and international organisations
- Genre: Non-fiction
- Publisher: Cambridge University Press
- Publication date: August 2019

Food or War is a 2019 book by British-Australian science writer Julian Cribb published by Cambridge University Press. The book discusses the central role of food in global stability, arguing that the modern food system, if unchecked, risks precipitating widespread conflict due to its unsustainable practices. Cribb proposes a reimagined food system that harnesses human creativity and technological innovation to secure a renewable, diverse, and safe food supply, thereby promoting global peace.

== Background ==
In a 2019 NYC Food Policy Center interview, Cribb discussed the themes of the book. He asserted that most modern wars are fundamentally driven by competition for essential resources like food, water, and land, rather than ideological differences alone. Cribb highlighted how addressing food insecurity could prevent conflicts, proposing a more sustainable and peaceful approach to global food production. He emphasized the urgency of reevaluating food security as a matter of national and international security to mitigate the risks of future wars.

== Summary ==
In 10 chapters, Cribb posits that the existing global agricultural system is unsustainable, primarily due to its contribution to resource depletion, environmental degradation, and exacerbation of climate change. The book highlights a "fearsome self-propagating cycle" where shortages in food supplies could lead to warfare, amplifying the very issues that caused the scarcity. Cribb argues that without significant transformation in food production and consumption, these crises will intensify as the global population approaches nine billion by mid-century. The narrative is supported by extensive literature review and historical evidence. In his conclusion, Cribb offers recommendations for radical changes to avert future crises, including promoting sustainable agricultural practices and rewilding efforts.

== Critical reception ==
In his review, Richard Bawden critically assessed Julian Cribb's book on the interlinked issues of global food security and warfare. The review underscored the historical context provided by Cribb, which traces the food-war nexus back through time, illustrating how food scarcity has often precipitated conflict. Despite the challenging nature of Cribb's solutions, Bawden noted that some initial steps towards these recommendations are being observed globally. The book not only serves as a warning but also as a guide for strategic thinking and action to address the complex challenges at the intersection of agriculture, environment, and human conflict.

Public health journalist Troy Farah highlighted Cribb's argument that future conflicts can potentially be mitigated through innovative agricultural practices and scientific advancements aimed at sustainable food production. Farah underscored Cribb's call for a significant redirection of resources from military spending to ecological restoration and food security initiatives as a critical strategy for fostering global peace and stability.

Alex Renton reviewed the book for The Guardian. Renton stressed Cribb’s provocative thesis that the battle to secure sufficient resources could either drive human societies into conflict or, conversely, force a more sustainable management of global resources. Renton pointed out that while Cribb's solutions, such as drastically reducing military budgets to fund eco-agriculture, are well-intentioned, they may be overly idealistic given current geopolitical realities. Despite its critical tone, the review acknowledged the importance of Cribb’s message, emphasizing the dire need for radical changes to avert a catastrophic future.

In his review of the book, Daniel Tompsett presented a mixed assessment of the book, recognizing its compelling arguments about the intrinsic link between food scarcity and global conflict. Tompsett lauded Cribb's in-depth exploration of how historical wars often stemmed more from resource scarcities than political or cultural disputes. He acknowledged the urgency of Cribb's call to address these issues proactively through sustainable practices and international cooperation. Tompsett also suggested that the book's singular focus on food as a primary cause of war may be somewhat reductive, although he admitted that the argument is well-supported and thought-provoking.
