= Wires on Fire =

American rock band

- Origin: Los Angeles, California, United States
- Genres: Rock
- Years active: 2004–present
- Labels: Psychedelic Judaism; Buddyhead Records
- Members: Evan Weiss; Michael Shuman; Jeff Lynn; Darren Weiss; Dash Hutton

Wires on Fire are a Los Angeles–based rock band, formed in 2004 by Jeff Lynn, Dash Hutton, Michael Shuman and Evan Weiss. The band has released titles such as Homewrecker EP (2004), Wires on Fire/Mean Reds split (2006) and their self-titled LP (2006), which sold particularly well in the United Kingdom. The band has toured all over the United States, sharing the stage with acts such as the Yeah Yeah Yeahs, Dillinger Escape Plan, The Icarus Line, Pretty Girls Make Graves, Cold War Kids, Black Lips, Man Man, Death From Above 1979, Pink Mountaintops and others. The band is currently involved in recording their next full length in Shabbey Road Studios.

Keith Morris with Wires on Fire

The group has performed with Keith Morris of Circle Jerks/Black Flag on two occasions. Once on October 31, 2005 at Fais Do Do in Los Angeles for the Mean Reds' last show, and again on June 11, 2006 @ The Echo in Los Angeles for the annual KXLU Fundrazor.

On June 11, 2013, Wires On Fire released a new single named "Up Your Sleeve" with another track "Born Dirty To Last Forever" available free through Psychedelic Judaism records.

== Discography ==
- God's Guest List b/w Learn To Drown (Revisited) Digital Single (2019 – Psychedelic Judaism)
- Up Your Sleeve b/w Born Dirty To Last Forever Digital Single (2013 – Psychedelic Judaism)
- Annie Carr b/w Mask 7" single (2008 – Psychedelic Judaism)
- Wires on Fire CD/LP (2006 – Buddyhead Records)
- Wires on Fire / Mean Reds Split CD+DVD (2005 – Buddyhead Records)
- V/A The Hills Have Eyes (2006 – Lakeshore Records)
- Homewrecker CD/EP (2004 – Buddyhead Records)
- V/A Golden Grouper Compilation (2004 – Gold Standard Labs)

== Sources ==
- O.C. Weekly Article
- Drowned In Sound Review
- Big Cheese Article
