= Rewild =

Studio album by Amazing Baby
- Released: June 22, 2009
- Recorded: 2008–2009
- Genre: Indie rock
- Length: 47:50
- Label: Shangri-La/Cooperative
- Producers: Amazing Baby; Claudius Mittendorfer

Singles from Rewild
- 1. "Headdress" Released: July 2009

Professional ratings
Aggregate scores
Source	Rating
Metacritic	68/100
Review scores
Source	Rating
Drowned In Sound	8/10
The Guardian	3/5 stars
Metro	2/5 stars
NME	3/5 stars
Planet Sound	7/10
Rockfeedback	link
The Skinny	3/5 stars
SPIN	3.5/5 stars
Uncut	4/5 stars

Rewild is the debut album by Amazing Baby and it was released on June 22, 2009. The album received a varied response from critics, and did not chart in either Europe or the United States.

== Track listing ==
1. "Bayonets"
2. "Invisible Palace"
3. "Kankra"
4. "Headdress"
5. "Dead Light"
6. "Deerripper"
7. "Old Tricks In Hell"
8. "The Narwhal"
9. "Roverfrenz"
10. "Smoke Bros"
11. "Pump Yr Brakes"

== Personnel ==
Amazing Baby

- Don Devore
- Matt Abeysekera
- Rob Laakso
- Simon O'Connor
- Will Roan

Additional musicians

- Tianna Kennedy
- Max Siegel
- Jesse Peterson
- Ben Goldwasser
- Gillian Rivers
- Will Berman
- Sam Decker
- Mike Shobe
- Max Decker
- Kristina Lieberson
- James Richardson
- Avery Devore
- Sam Kulik
