= Amazing Baby =

US musical group

- Origin: Brooklyn, NY, USA
- Genres: Psychedelic rock, indie rock
- Years active: 2008–2011
- Labels: Shangri-La Music, Cooperative Music
- Members: Simon O'Connor; Will Berman; Will Roan; Don Devore; Johnny Hunt; Miles Benjamin Anthony Robinson
- Past members: Gardner Allen; Matt Abeysekera; Ryan Rapsys; Leah Cary; Jane Herships; Rob Laakso

Amazing Baby was an American indie rock band based in Brooklyn, New York in 2008. The band began as an after-work collaboration between Will Roan, Will Berman and Simon O'Connor, who had known one another from the Brooklyn music scene, and who were working at the same ringtone company.

The band's debut album Rewild was released in June 2009.

O'Connor, Berman, and Roan wrote new material for their forthcoming album in 2010, tentatively titled "Ice Water", and are currently recording with the band and producer/engineer Emery Dobyns.

== Critical reception ==
The band's debut LP Rewild received a varied response from critics and failed to chart. They have been criticized for being known more for their sense of fashion and connections to popular bands than for their musical talent, The Spin reviewer wrote, "Channeling glam, metal, punk, power pop, and experimental noise, Rewild is like a tour through a psychedelic fantasyland, featuring visions, hallucinations, and glimpses of death. Roan coaxes with an almost deliriously euphoric art-rock swagger (see reggae jam "Roverfrenz" and infectious chant-along "Smoke Bros"), while O'Connor infuses every track with hedonistic energy. " Rolling Stone when describing Amazing Baby wrote, "On their stunning debut album Rewild (out this month), Amazing Baby deliver tunes that are at times thoroughly vintage and refreshingly futuristic: "The Narwhal" sounds like Led Zeppelin at their druggiest and most mystical; "Invisible Place" soars and swoops like Pink Floyd's "Echoes" and "Kankra" builds into such an anthemic frenzy, you'll be oozing serotonin for days. The crew also have a wonky sense of humor, especially on tunes like the scuzzed-out jam "Smoke Bros," which features stoner-appropriate ruminations like "She protects her animals/ We are starving cannibals.". While reviewer Christian Hoard wrote, "On their debut, the quintet spread the arty Cheez Whiz like MGMT and Yeasayer while bringing a stronger Sixties-pop influence, specifically with swirling keyboards with melodies that recall Love and the Dave Clark Five. "Roverfrenz," an airy synth fantasia with Animal Collective-ish percussion, gets by on neato textures instead of sharp tunes. In general, Rewild could use a little more of the latter, but who has time for that when you're knee-deep in giant guitars and weird ambient vocalizations?" Amazing Baby got a lot of buzz, it seemed people were jealous or angry that these kids could grow so fast and become so popular while not exactly doing things "by the book". Pitchfork wrote, "Coming straight out of Wesleyan to score a ton of SXSW buzz, bro-ing down with MGMT, getting breathless future-of-the-scene press from Interview and Rolling Stone and The Guardian, strutting around in 1971 cosplay while rolling their eyes at journalists..."

== Discography ==
=== Albums ===
- Rewild (2009)

=== EPs ===
- Infinite Fucking Cross (2008) (digital only)

=== Singles ===
- "Pump yr Brakes" (2008)
- "Bayonets" (2009)
- "Headdress" (2009)
- "Supreme Being" (2009)
