= Hot Rod Condoms =

U.S. condom brand

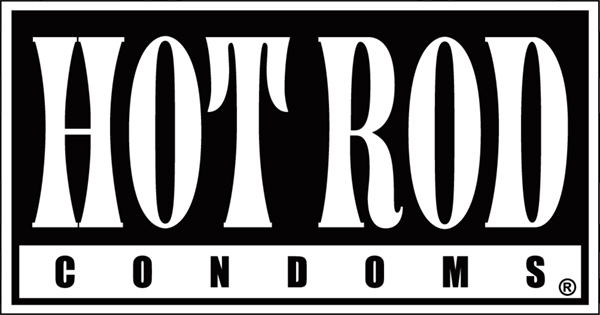
- Current owner: Kinyon Enterprises, Ltd.
- Country: United States
- Introduced: 1994; 32 years ago
- Ambassador: Jon Kinyon
- Website: hotrodcondoms.com

Hot Rod Condoms is a range of condoms manufactured and distributed by U.S.-based Kinyon Enterprises, Ltd. The brand was launched in 1994 by founder and president Jon Kinyon.

In October 2002, Hot Rod Condoms introduced its Speedstrip Applicator condom, the first condom with a built-in applicator to be marketed worldwide. The patented applicator facilitates putting a condom on quickly and easily. This was also one of the first "novelty" condoms to meet U.S. Food and Drug Administration standards for disease prevention and contraception.

In 2004, Hot Rod Condoms began sponsoring shows on Playboy TV's Spice Networks including: Spice Live, Spice Clips, The Nooner, and Unzipped. Spice Live was the first live interactive adult cable channel and was broadcast in high definition.
