= Fulltone =

American musical effects manufacturer

Fulltone USA Inc.
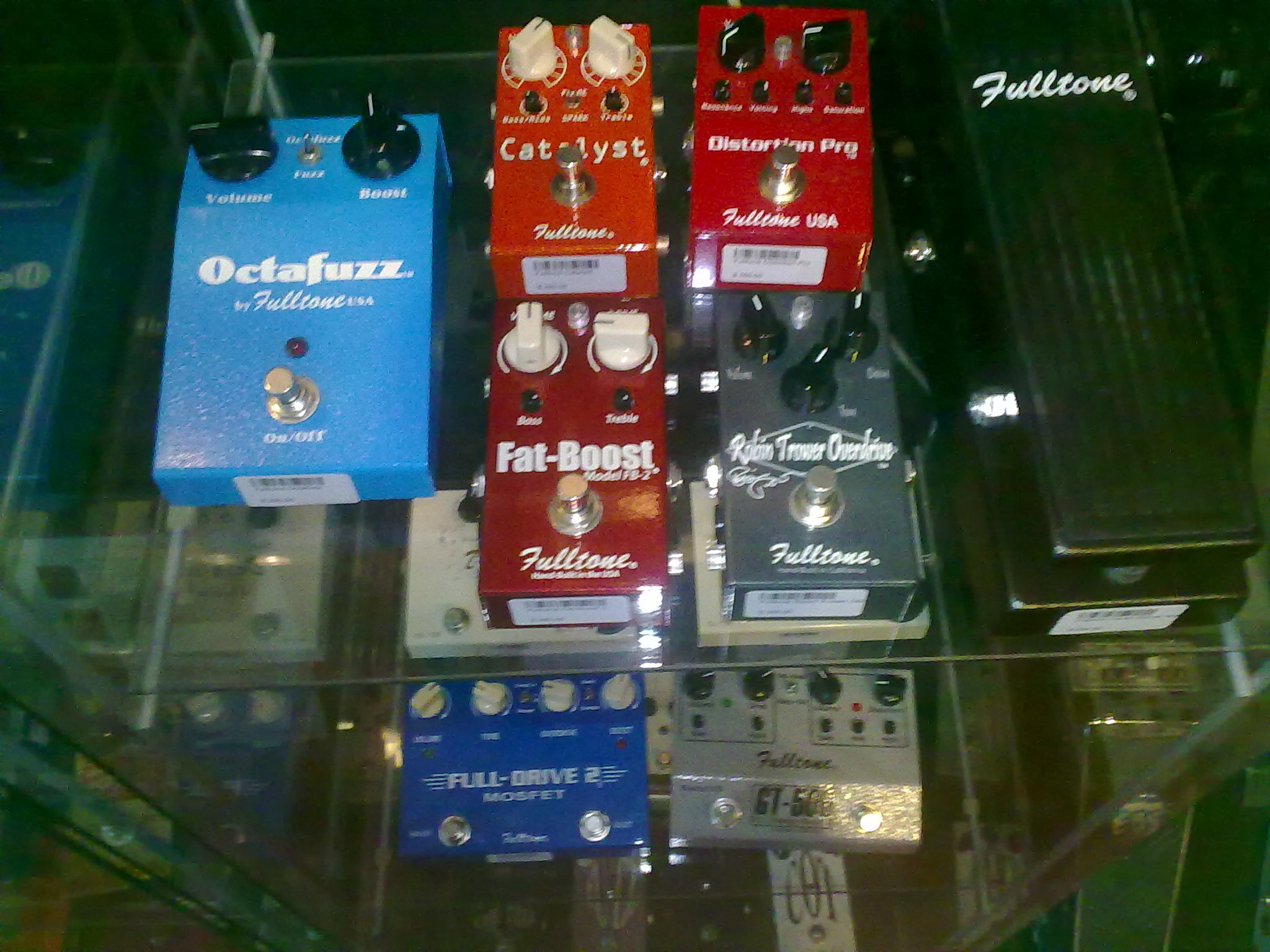
- Type: Private
- Industry: Musical instruments
- Founded: 1991; 35 years ago
- Founder: Michael Fuller
- Headquarters: Nashville, Tennessee (formerly Culver City, California)
- Products: Effects units
- Website: Fulltone USA

Fulltone USA Inc. is an American manufacturer of effects pedals for electric guitar. Founded by Michael Fuller in California in 1991, Fulltone was one of the first "boutique" pedal companies and became best known for its overdrive pedals like the Full-Drive and OCD, the latter of which Music Radar dubbed "one of the most legendary overdrives ever made."

== History ==
=== Early pedals ===
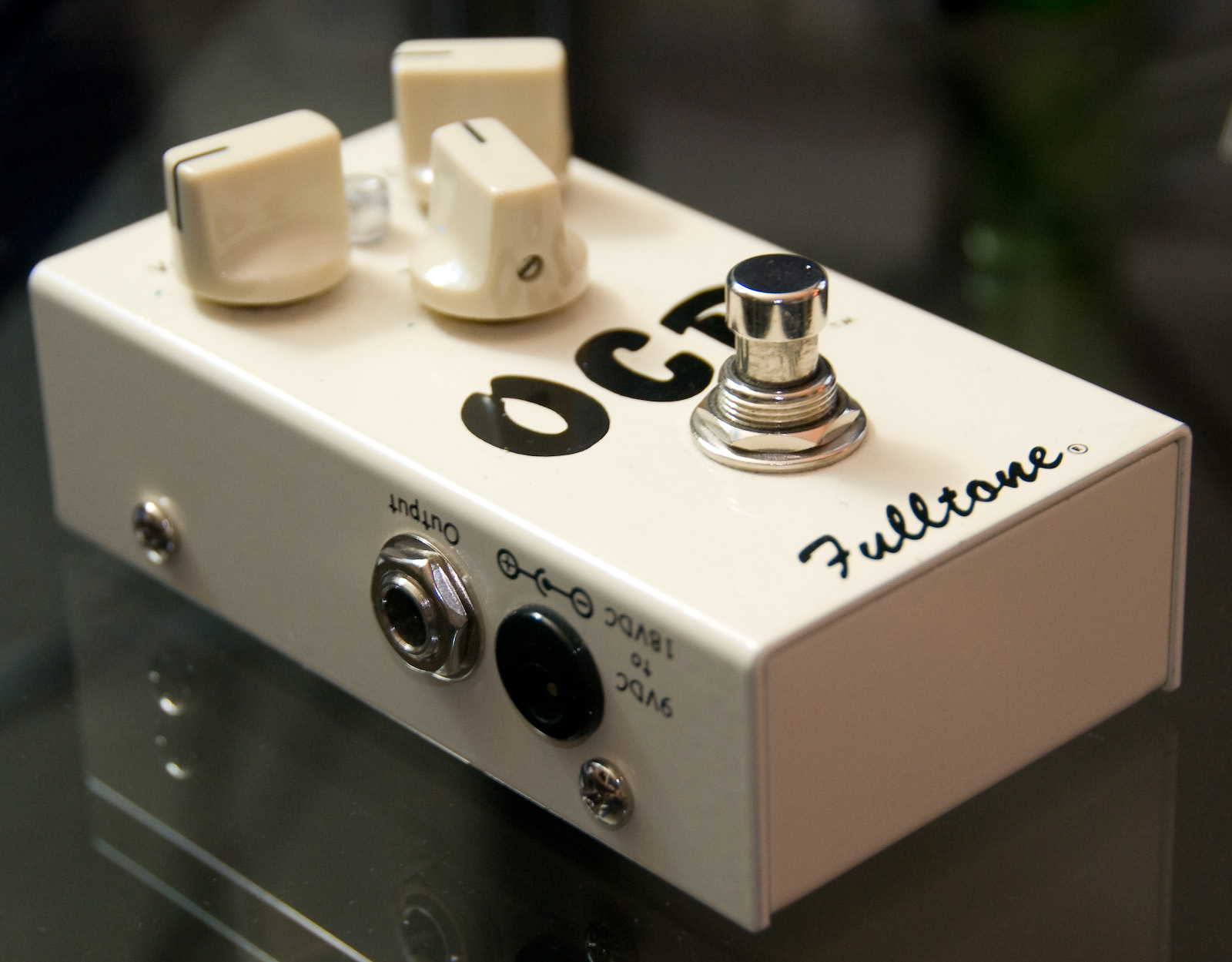
The Fulltone OCD

Fulltone found success in the 1990s, largely through print marketing, with the popularity of the brand's Full-Drive line of overdrive pedals. Fuller continued to expand his company's lineup, adding new overdrives like the Plimsoul and the Clyde wah pedal. In 2004, Fulltone released the Obsessive Compulsive Drive (OCD), the success of which further established Fulltone as a major boutique pedal-maker.

=== Controversy ===
Fuller made headlines in 2020 when he made several controversial comments on social media during the George Floyd protests. In a June 2 post, he stated, "What is this like night 4 of looting with 100% impunity. The pussy Mayor and Governor don't give a shit about small businesses, and it's never been more clear." In response to criticism, Fuller added, "Ahh I feel better, and flushed out some prissy boys who were raised to pee sitting down. Now I'll delete." Fuller deleted the posts but in an email to a customer who characterized Fuller's comments as "valuing storefronts over police brutality," Fuller replied:

I am begging you to sell your pedals because you actually don’t deserve them. You are actually so racist that you believe the Good people who are protesting are the same as the Organized gang banger criminals who are looting 'store fronts'. Those 'store fronts' are good hardworking people's lives and livelihoods. I'm [sic] fact if I see you with a Fulltone pedal I will tag it and break into your house and loot it from you, because its my free expression to do so... right?

Fuller's comments resulted in industry backlash. Guitar Center announced it would no longer sell Fulltone products in-store or online, while Reverb.com suspended sales of all new and B-stock Fulltone pedals. Artists like Mark Hoppus of Blink-182 pledged to sell their Fulltone gear and Jason Isbell called Fulltone pedals "overpriced junk" while recommending a black-owned pedal company. The brand's own fan page also condemned the comments.

Fuller subsequently apologized, stating people were "rightfully pissed off" at his comments as a "privileged white guy." He stated his comments were not made at the "good people" protesting but rather at the mayor and governor for allowing them to be unfairly arrested while criminals took advantage of the protests to loot stores. He later deleted his apology.

=== Closing ===
After 30 years, the company closed its Culver City production shop in 2022, with Fuller stating that making products entirely in the United States was no longer profitable. Prices for used Fulltone pedals increased dramatically as a result—as much as 500%. Josh Scott, founder of JHS Pedals, cited Fulltone's closing as the end of the boutique pedal era: "I think that Fulltone signifies the ending of this era. There’s really nothing left." Despite the factory closing, Fuller stated his intention to continue making pedals in smaller quantities to protect his trademarks and patents.

=== Relaunch ===
Fulltone relaunched in partnership with Jackson Audio in 2024, with a new facility in Nashville, Tennessee. Fuller will continue developing products, while Jackson Audio handles manufacturing and distribution.
