= MyToons =

Defunct online business

- Product type: Online Animation Community
- Current owner: MyToons Holdings, Inc. Co-Founders: Paul Ford, Stacey Ford, Dan Kraus
- Country: San Antonio, Texas, USA
- Introduced: 2006, launched March 2007
- Markets: Worldwide
- Website: http://www.mytoons.com

MyToons was an online business that developed a free online community for animation that supported content sharing and social networking. MyToons.com was headquartered in San Antonio, Texas.

The site was founded in 2006 by Paul Ford, Stacey Ford and Dan Kraus as a spinoff of Bauhaus Software. The Texas Emerging Technology Fund supported it with a $500,000 grant.

After four months of private beta, the site launched publicly in March 2007 during the South by Southwest festival in Austin, Texas, and began distributing member-created animation videos to Internet audiences worldwide. Three weeks after its launch, MyToons had received more than 1.5 million unique visitors.

== Milestones ==
In June 2008, MyToons.com became the first global animation community to offer users the ability to upload and view animations in High Definition. At this time, the HD animation contest Get With the Times! was also launched.

In January 2009, MyToons laid off a large part of its staff.

In April 2009, MyToons closed down completely after venture capital funding ceased.

== Affiliates ==
- Adobe – Sponsor of Get with the Times! contest, June 2008
  - Adobe Media Player (AMP) Channel Partner, March 2008
- MonsterJam Animation Contest – Co-Sponsor, May 2008
- Warner Bros., Entertainment – Contest Partner, May 2008
- The Second Annual Animation Book Look – Co-Sponsor, May 2008
- Google – Google Search Appliance (GSA), April 2008
  - YouTube Channel Partner, February 2008
- DRAW Exhibit, London – Co-Sponsor, March 2008
- IMAX – Contest Partner, February 2008
- Krispy Kreme – Contest Partner, February 2008
- 35th Annual Annie Awards, Hollywood, CA – Silver Sponsor and After-Party Entertainment Sponsor, February 2008
- Animation Army – Monthly Meetings Sponsor, 2007 – 2008
- INTERspectacular Design and Concept Studio – Bumper Blastoff! contest partner, December 2007
- Best In The Southwest Flash Animation Festival – Gold Sponsor, Albuquerque NM, October 2007
- Los Angeles Animation Festival (L.A.A.F.) – Major Sponsor, October 2007
- Animators: Andrew Gordon, Mike Wellins, Rusty Mills – Bust In and Win! contest Judges, September 2007
- Ottawa International Animation Festival – Major Sponsor and Panel Speaker, September 2007
- Anime Expo – Event, Promotions and Panel Speaker, June – July 2007
- Kalamazoo Animation Festival International (KAFI) – Bronze Sponsor, May 2007
- Limelight Networks – Flash Video Streaming Infrastructure, April 2007
- Draw/MyToons Launch – Platinum Sponsor for DRAW exhibit & Gallery Lombardi, SXSW Austin, TX, March 2007
