= Lovetone =

British manufacturer of analog effect pedals

Lovetone was a manufacturer of analog effect pedals in England in the 1990s and 2000s. The effects were created by Vlad Naslas and Daniel Coggins, and their pedals were noted for their tongue-in-cheek names like the "Big Cheese" and the "Ring Stinger".

Most Lovetone effects replicate a popular vintage analog effect in part, but usually implement the effect in ways not previously seen in smaller so-called "stompbox" effects units. Many Lovetone units are noted for the ability to control multiple parameters of the effect through the use of low frequency oscillators (LFOs), expression pedals, or control voltage (CV)—features more commonly found in analog synthesizers and synthesizer modules.
