= Ink & Dagger =

American hardcore punk band

- Origin: Philadelphia, Pennsylvania, United States
- Genres: Post-hardcore; hardcore punk; punk rock; horror punk; noise rock; emo; psychedelic hardcore
- Years active: 1995–1999, 2010–2011, 2025–present
- Labels: Initial; Buddyhead; Trust
- Spinoffs: Cut Throat Tactics
- Spinoff of: Frail, Crud is a Cult, The Mandela Strikeforce, OnXpoint
- Members: Don Devore; Jorge González; David Wagenschutz; Joshua Brown; Geoff Rickly
- Past members: Sean McCabe; For more information see Ink & Dagger#Members

Ink & Dagger is a hardcore punk band from Philadelphia that was originally active in the 1990s. The two permanent members throughout the band's career were guitarist Don Devore and vocalist Sean Patrick McCabe. Other members included Ashli State, Terry Yerves, Ryan McLaughlin, Joshua Brown, Jennifer Layne Park, Dave Wagenschutz, Derek Zglenski, and Eric Wareheim. Band members frequently incorporated references to vampires in their music, painted their faces, and played with fake blood. Some members were previously in Crud is a Cult, The Mandela Strike Force and Frail.

== History ==
The band toured Europe with Refused in 1998. Over time, Ink & Dagger wore their trademark facepaint less often, as, according to McCabe, the band felt it "very discouraging to have people only see us as 'that emo-goth-core band that wears makeup'".

=== Breakup and other projects (1999–2009) ===
In 1999, Ink & Dagger formally announced that they were disbanding. Shortly after recording what was to be the band's final album, singer Sean Patrick McCabe was found dead in a motel room in Indiana in 2000, at age 27. The final and self-titled album was released on Buddyhead Records with a picture of a young Sean in a vampire costume featured in the CD booklet.

Don Devore currently plays in the band Sick Feeling, Lilys, and Collapsing Scenery. He has also played in Amazing Baby, The Icarus Line, and others.

Joshua Brown went on to play in Lenola and Like A Fox. He currently plays bass in The Midnight Sounds.

Microsoft Xbox videogame Amped uses three songs from The Fine Art of Original Sin. In 2005, former drummer Ryan McLaughlin tried to solely sue Microsoft, claiming his band's songs were used without the band's knowledge. The suit was settled out of court in 2006, after a judge required the involvement of the rest of the band.

=== Reunion with Geoff Rickly (2010–2011) ===
In August 2010, Ink & Dagger headlined the 2010 This Is Hardcore festival. Geoff Rickly of Thursday fame sang for this show. All of Ink & Dagger's profits earned from tickets and merchandise at This Is Hardcore benefited Maks Zielanski, a child diagnosed with cancer. Maks is the son of Ed Zielanski who was a member of Crud Is a Cult and Flagman. Ink & Dagger also played a small number of additional shows in Brooklyn, LA and Philadelphia. Rickly's vocals were generally warmly received as a replacement for McCabe. Jon Reiss of New York Press commented, "The band seemed pretty tight and the choice of Rickly for a singer worked about eighty percent of the time. It's impossible to replace a front man so dynamic as McCabe." Ink & Dagger also toured the UK with Rickly in January 2011.

The brief reunion lead to the creation of a new band called Cut Throat Tactics featuring Joshua Brown, Terry Yerves, Chris Tropea, and Don Devore of Ink & Dagger, Geoff Rickly, and Ben Weinman of The Dillinger Escape Plan. Apart from a now deleted song preview that was released on SoundCloud in 2011, Cut Throat Tactics never released any music.

== On-stage antics ==
On one occasion, the band vomited on Christmas trees on stage. McCabe was also infamous for egging Hare Krishna devotees and throwing yogurt at Earth Crisis.

The band's first Halloween show in New Brunswick, NJ was one their most notorious shows. In the words of Robby Redcheeks, "Trope built a coffin to carry Jenny Jamz [Jennifer Layne Park] out to into the show. The show was PACKED. So we put Jenny in the coffin outside of the show, and me and 3 other dudes carried her in pushing through the crowd. People were like 'WHAT THE FUCK IS THAT?!' We were all in Dagger makeup also. We set the coffin down in front of the crowd. Jenny got out wearing a black leather body suit and started reciting the oath she wrote in the Drive This 7”. Reciting, im sorry, more like inciting a riot. She was pushing people and yelling in their faces. I had previously prepared a batch of Dagger blood, (this was actually the first time it was used), a mix of 1 bottle of club soda & 1 red color food dye. We made 4 bottles of it and perched on each side of the band for when Jenny was done. When she reached the end, Dagger had already been building up feedback and noise. She finished, and they started off with the beginning to 'Changeling' (if I remember correctly) . Then BLAM we covered the crowd with blood. And chaos erupted throughout. Needless to say, anyone that was at that show will remember that show forever. Including me."

== Musical style and influence ==
Ink & Dagger's lyrics dwelt in what singer Sean McCabe once described as "the dark, psychotic side of life."

An example of their influence can be seen on the record The Fine Art of Original Sin which featured several tracks breaking completely from established norms of post-hardcore, incorporating aspects of techno, or drum and bass music.

The band's influences included Heroin, Current, Policy of 3, Chino Horde, Universal Order of Armageddon, Born Against, Monorchid, My Bloody Valentine, Spacemen 3, George Crumb, Sun Ra, Fugazi, Brian Baker's work in Minor Threat and Dag Nasty, Swiz, Circus Lupus, Rollerskate Skinny, Beach Boys, and Stone Temple Pilots. Bassist Ashli State cited influences upon his word in the band as the Jesus Lizard, Dillinger Escape Plan and Converge. Additionally, the inspirations of past emocore band Frail can still be heard in the yelps and falsettos on Ink & Dagger's 7"s.

They have been cited as an influence by American Nightmare, Defeater, the Used, My Chemical Romance and Thursday.

== Members ==
Current members

- Don Devore – guitars, programming (1995–1999, 2010–2011, 2025–present)
- Jorge González – guitars (1995–1997, 2025–present)
- David Wagenschutz – drums (1995–1996, 2025–present)
- Joshua Brown – bass, backing vocals (1998–1999, 2010–2011, 2025–present)
- Geoff Rickly – lead vocals (2010–2011, 2025–present)

Former members and contributors

- Sean Patrick McCabe – lead vocals, keyboards, programming (1995–1999; died 2000)
- Jennifer Park – vocals (1996–1998)
- Chris "T-Rope" Tropea – guitars (1998–1999, 2010–2011); lights, roadie
- Dallas Bratcher – guitars
- Justin O’Hare – guitars
- Matt Cleary – bass (1995)
- Eric Wareheim – bass (1995–1996)
- Ashli State – bass (1996–1997)
- Gregg Foreman – bass (1997; died 2026)
- Terrance Yerves – drums (1996, 1998–1999; 2010–2011)
- Ryan McLaughlin – drums (1997–1998)
- Robby Redcheeks – lights, roadie

== Discography ==
Studio albums

- The Fine Art of Original Sin (1998, Initial)
- Ink & Dagger (2000, Buddyhead)

Compilations

- Drive This Seven Inch Wooden Stake Through My Philadelphia Heart (1997, Initial)
- Ink & Dagger: The Complete Works (2025, Trust Records)

EPs

- Love Is Dead (1996, Happy Days, Six Feet Under (RE))
- Drive This Seven Inch Wooden Stake Through My Philadelphia Heart (1997, Initial)
- Experiments In Nocturnal Sound and Energy (1997, Simba, Revelation)
- Sensation (1999, Music Is My Heroine)

Splits

- Split with The Icarus Line (1999, New American Dream)
- Split with Le Shok (1999, Initial)

Bootlegs

- For All The Fucked-Up Children Of This World We Give You Ink & Dagger (1998, self-released)

Compilation appearances

Year	Song	Album	Label	Format
1996	"Crawler"	Silver Five Inch Collection Vol. 1	Extent FanZine	CD
1997	"Full Circle"	CT Mailorder #1	Core Tex Records	CD
1997	"Six Feet Under"	Second Hand Citizen Records Volume One	Second Hand Citizen	7"
1998	"Vampirefastcode Ver. 1.5"	Nothing Left #8 CD Sampler	Nothing Left Zine	CD
1998	"13th Dream"	Philly Shreds	Schuylkill Records	7"/12"
1998	"The Fine Art Of Original Sin"	Double Exposure	Go-Kart Records, Black Rat Recordings	12"
1998	"The Fine Art Of Original Sin"	Catalog Sampler Disc Number One	Initial Records	CD
1998	"Vampire Fast Code"	Cooler Than Your Mom	Various	CD
1998	"Vampire Fast Code" / "Full Circle" (Demo)	Magic Weekend	Initial Records	CD
1998	"The Fine Art Of Original Sin"	Initial Extreme Music Sampler CD	Initial Records	CD
2000	"Actress"	Metroschifter - Encapsulated	Doghouse Records, I Can't Believe It's A Record Company	CD/7"
2000	"The Solo Mission"	Liberation Sucks	Liberation Records	CD
2000	"Fine Art Of Original Sin"	Sweet Deal! The Initial & Eulogy Sampler	Initial Records, Eulogy Recordings	CD
2003	"Shadowtalker" / "The History in Ecstasy" / "Creatures Like Us"	Buddyhead Suicide	Buddyhead	CD
2004	"Catch the Flashback"	Initial Records: Worst Label Ever!	Initial Records	CD
2006	"Omit (Excerpt)"	Punk Is Dead	Buddyhead	DVD
?	"Vampire Fast Code Ver. 1.5"	Sleigh Bells - Mixtape	Self-released	CD
?	"Mayor Withdrawal"	18:18	Carbon Music, Now Or Never Records	10"
