= Buddyhead Records =

U.S. music website and record label

Buddyhead
- Founded: 1998
- Founder: Aaron North and Travis Keller
- Genre: Rock
- Country of origin: United States
- Location: Hollywood, California

Buddyhead is a music website and independent record label created by Aaron North and Travis Keller in the summer of 1998, in Hollywood, California. Buddyhead engaged in pop culture and music industry criticism. Its legendary gossip column resulted in over a dozen lawsuits, filed by numerous celebrities and record labels, including Korn, Courtney Love, Fred Durst, Moby, Drive-Thru Records, and Axl Rose, as well as high profile entertainment executives such as Ari Emanuel.

== History ==
Buddyhead Records is an independent record label from Hollywood, California that originated from a website of the same name. The label began in 2000 with the pressing of a seven-inch single from The Icarus Line ("Kill Cupid With A Nail File") and is continuing over twenty years later. The label has released records by various bands, including Gayrilla Biscuits, The Cassettes, Shat, Dios (also known as (dios) Malos, Ink & Dagger, The Icarus Line, Burning Brides, The Dillinger Escape Plan, Jubilee, Your Enemies Friends, The Mean Reds, 400 Blows, TEXT (ex-Refused), At the Drive-In, Murder City Devils, Modwheelmood, Wires On Fire, Radio Vago, Pyramyd, and The Cauterizers.

Buddyhead Records also became known for its compilations. Their first compilation was released in 2003, the now out-of-print Buddyhead Suicide Sampler, which featured key tracks from each of the label's releases, rare/live tracks from each band on the label's roster, and prank calls to music-industry luminaries from an unknown caller who went by the name "Torture Device". Rumors circulated claiming that Torture Device was everyone from Bill Hicks to Sam Kinison to Chevy Chase. Buddyhead never officially commented on the matter.

In 2004, Buddyhead released the major label-funded Gimme Skelter compilation, which was paid for (and distributed by) Netwerk Records. The compilation featured cover art by Raymond Pettibon, who had previously created cover art for bands such as Black Flag, Sonic Youth, Foo Fighters and OFF!). The compilation also contained exclusive and/or rare songs from artists such as Primal Scream, Mudhoney, Iggy Pop, Yeah Yeah Yeahs, Wire, Weezer (Pinkerton B-side), Dead Meadow, and Le Tigre.

In addition to CDs, the label released a DVD compilation in 2004 entitled Buddyhead Presents: Punk Is Dead through Image Entertainment, which featured music videos from TV on the Radio, The Jesus Lizard, Singapore Sling, Yeah Yeah Yeahs, Turbonegro, The Locust, British Sea Power, The Dillinger Escape Plan, The Fiery Furnaces, and others.

Buddyhead were also part of a number of pranks, including vandalizing The Strokes' tour bus, and breaking into Fred Durst's office at Interscope Records. While in the office, Buddyhead stole three of Fred Durst's red baseball caps and took photos in front of Limp Bizkit gold records. Afterwards, the hats were auctioned off on eBay (selling for $1700 each), and the money was donated to a charity for rape victims, a stab at Durst for allegations of rape that had occurred in the mosh pit during Limp Bizkit's set at Woodstock '99.

The label recently saw releases by Pyramyd, The Cauterizers, Rathbone and Problemas' debut LP.

== Roster ==
- 400 Blows
- Burning Brides
- The Cassettes
- The Dillinger Escape Plan
- Dios, aka Dios (Malos)
- The Icarus Line
- Ink & Dagger
- Mean Reds
- Moccasin
- Modwheelmood
- Murder City Devils
- The PoPo
- Pyramyd
- Radio Vago
- Rathbone
- Shat
- TEXT
- Wires On Fire
- Your Enemies Friends
- The Cauterizers

== See also ==
- List of record labels
