= The Icarus Line =

American post-hardcore band (1998–2015)

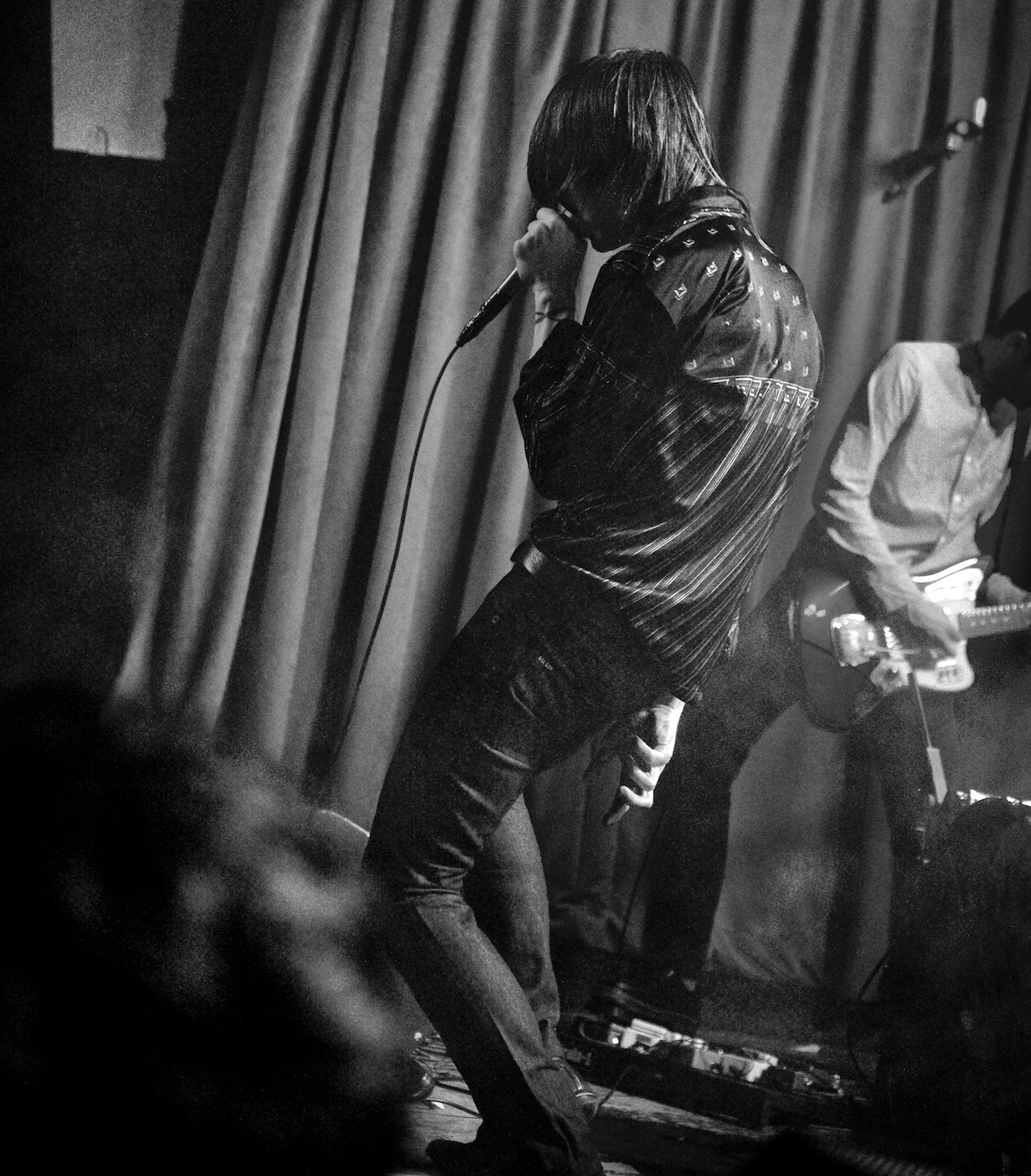
- The Icarus Line performing in London, 2013

Background information
- Origin: Los Angeles, California, U.S.
- Genres: Post-hardcore; alternative rock; screamo; garage rock; noise rock
- Years active: 1998–2015
- Labels: Buddyhead; Crank!; Hellcat; V2; Dim Mak
- Past members: Joe Cardamone; Aaron North; Lance Arnao; Alvin DeGuzman (d. 2017); Aaron Austin; John Guerra; Mike Felix; Jeff Watson; Troy Petry; Don Devore; Ben Hallet; John Bennett; Aric Bohn; James Striff; Devon Monet Ashley; Jason DeCorse
- Website: Official Myspace

The Icarus Line was an American post-hardcore band from Los Angeles, California, active from 1998 until 2015.

== Career ==
=== 1998–2003 ===
The Icarus Line's roots started from a high school rock group, Kanker Sores. Tragedy struck the band in 1997, when Tim Childs, drummer and close friend, was killed in a car crash shortly after recording their Pivot EP as Kanker Sores on Recess Records, and also songs for an aborted split 7” with Treadwell. The last Kanker Sores show was at the Che Café in San Diego, with Jenny Piccolo and The Locust.

In 1998 The Icarus Line formed with Joe Cardamone on vocals, Aaron North on guitar, Lance Arnao on bass, and Aaron Austin (formerly of Naked Aggression) on drums. Before even playing a single show, the band booked an extensive East Coast tour with Ink & Dagger. The Icarus Line played their first show at The Melody Bar in New Brunswick, New Jersey.

On this first tour they sold an untitled demo tape, which consisted of the four Kanker Sores songs recorded in 1997 for the split release with Treadwell. Shortly after the tour, the band added Alvin DeGuzman on guitar. This reunited all four surviving members from Kanker Sores, and formed the core of The Icarus Line's lineup as it existed for many years, minus the "revolving door" of drummers.

Hellcat Records issued the band's first release in 1998. The 7-inch EP, Highlypuncturingnoisetestingyourabilitytohate, consisted of older songs the group had created while still Kanker Sores. Their next release, the Red And Black Attack EP, was released that same year on the New American Dream label. 1999 saw the band release a split 7-inch with Ink & Dagger, followed shortly by the "Kill Cupid With A Nail File" single on Buddyhead. 2000 found the band finally recording their debut album, Mono, across different sessions with Mark Trombino and Alex Newport. Recording was swift, unpolished, and essentially "live".

In 2001, the band embarked on an eight-week tour of Europe, and the "Feed A Cat To Your Cobra" single was released in the UK. A further world tour from May to October followed, including dates in Europe, Japan, Australia and the US. That summer, while performing at the Hard Rock Cafe in Austin, Texas during SXSW, North smashed a guitar display case and removed one of Stevie Ray Vaughan's guitars, an incident that became infamous.

Jeff Watson quit the band soon after, and Troy Petrey from Toys That Kill replaced him. Two John Peel sessions were recorded, the first while The Icarus Line were in the UK on a two-month tour, and the second while playing the Reading Festival in the summer of 2002. At the end of the year a split 7-inch with Burning Brides was released, featuring covers of two Misfits songs.

The second single from Mono, "Love Is Happiness", was released in the UK as a limited edition EP on May 5, 2003. The Icarus Line's sixth drummer, Troy Petrey, left the band and Jeff "The Captain" Watson returned. Lance Arnao also left the band and Don Devore took his place on bass.

Penance Soiree, The Icarus Line's second full-length release and first on their new label, V2 Records, was recorded during the summer of 2003 in Hollywood, and mixed in London that autumn. There was not as much touring this year as previous ones, just a few dates supporting the likes of Primal Scream and A Perfect Circle at the beginning and end of the year.

=== 2004–2010 ===
In 2004 Penance Soiree was finally released. Radically different from their debut, the album was clearly influenced by bands such as The Birthday Party and The Stooges. The album also featured a noisy, washed-out guitar sound reminiscent of The Jesus and Mary Chain. In 2005, Aaron North quit the band and later joined Trent Reznor in Nine Inch Nails.

In 2006, the band released an EP called Black Presents. The third full-length, Black Lives At The Golden Coast, came out in May 2007. Due to personal differences, Don Devore was released from the group before the release of the record. Guitarists Jason DeCorse and James Striff joined the band pushing the band toward a more blues based sound compared to the atonal style on Black Lives. After a world tour with The Lemonheads and Wolfmother, they returned to Los Angeles to build a studio (Gang Bang Park), and start a new record with the newest touring lineup including Joe Cardamone, Jeff Watson, Alvin DeGuzman, James Striff and Jason DeCorse. In August 2011, the band released the album Wildlife, characterized by the greater prominence of frontman Joe Cardamone, who, in addition to lead singer and primary songwriter duties, further expanded his responsibilities to include producing and engineering.

Wildlife was tracked at Sunset Sound Studios in Hollywood completing the band's trilogy of albums recorded in all three studios on the premises. Greg Gordon engineered the sessions with Bradley Pike assisting. All of the songs were tracked live as a group to analog tape. Overdubs and mixing were completed at Joe Cardamone's home studio in Highland Park, California. As he had never engineered his own mixes, the final product was unpolished and exploratory. This attempt polarized critics; some criticized the record for sounding unpolished, while others applauded the album's intuitive nature.

The first single, "We Sick" was released on February 23, 2010. Annie Hardy from Giant Drag is featured on several of the tracks on Wildlife, and also appeared on organ for some of the Los Angeles live performances surrounding the record release. Ariel Pink is also credited as making "Baby Noises" in the liner notes.

=== 2011–2015 ===
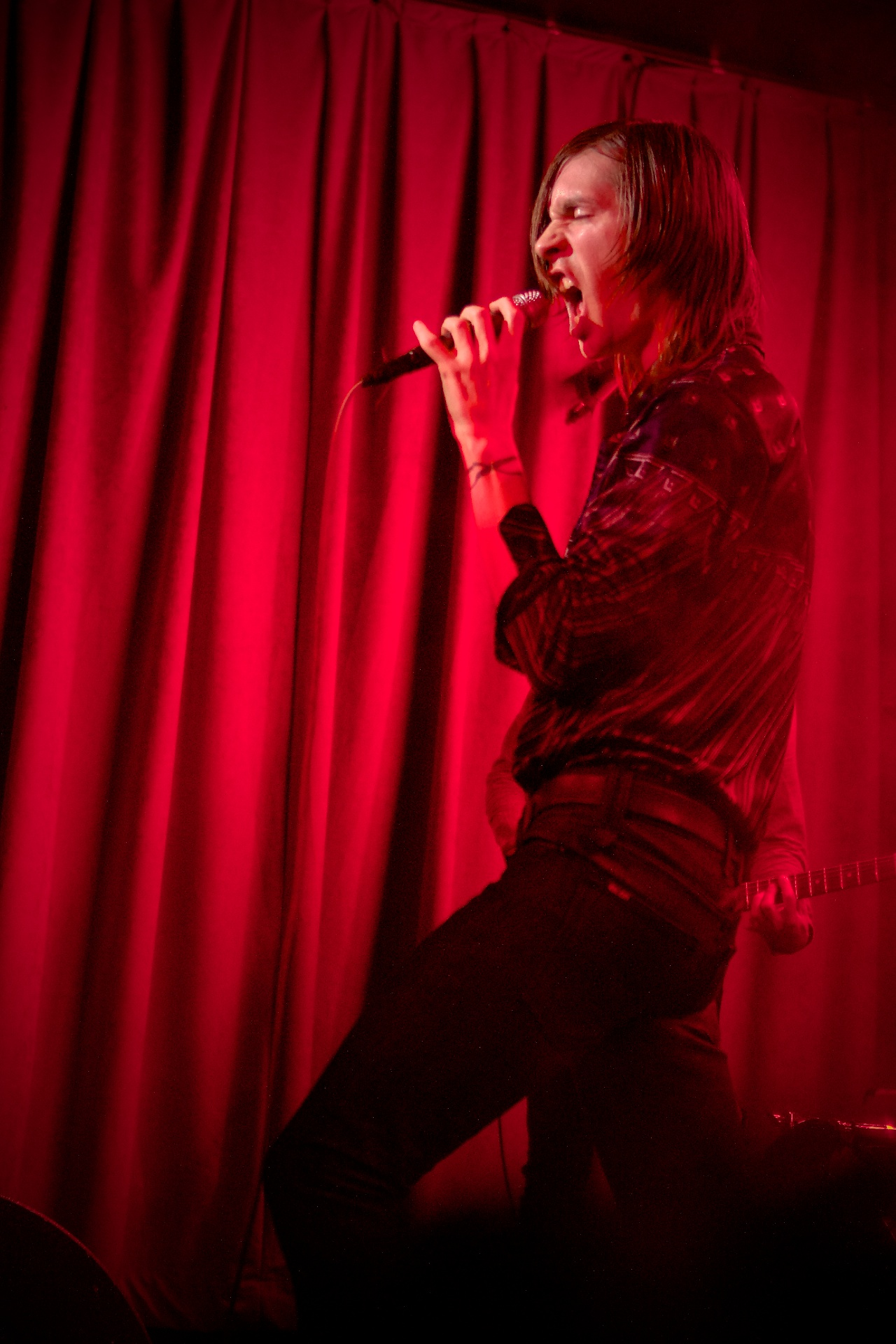
Joe Cardamone performing with The Icarus Line in London, 2013

After the release of Wildlife, the band minus James Striff and Jeff Watson embarked on a world tour for most of 2012, touring with Killing Joke. Lance Arnao, the group's original bass player, reemerged to join the group for the tours and to record what was to become the Live in London LP. Jeff Watson was also replaced with Ben Hallet on drums. Following the UK/European tours The Icarus Line returned to tour the US with The Cult, culminating in a sold-out homecoming show at the Hollywood Palladium.

In late 2012, Joe Cardamone, Alvin DeGuzman, Lance Arnao and Ben Hallet began the writing process for the next yet-to-be-titled full-length LP. New songs "Salem Slims" and "Junkadelic" were featured in the 2012 live performances.

In August 2014, the band released their seventh full-length album, Avowed Slavery.

In October 2015, the band released their eighth full-length album, All Things Under Heaven.

After DeGuzman was diagnosed with cancer, and becoming disillusioned by touring with Scott Weiland, Cardamone quietly left the group at the end of 2015, pursuing a solo career. DeGuzman died in October 2017 after a two-year-long cancer battle.

== In media ==
The Icarus Line were the subject of the 2018-released independent feature film The Icarus Line Must Die, directed by filmmaker Michael Grodner. The film, released by Dark Star Pictures, stars Cardamone as himself, and features musicians such as Keith Morris, Ariel Pink, and Annie Hardy (Giant Drag).

== Discography ==
=== EPs ===
- Highlypuncturingnoisetestingyourabilitytohate (1998)
- Red and Black Attack (1998)
- Three Jesus Songs (2003)
- Black Presents (2006)

=== Albums ===
- Mono (2001)
- Penance Soiree (2004)
- Black Lives at the Golden Coast (2007)
- Wildlife (August 2011)
- Live in London (April 2012)
- Slave Vows (August 2013)
- Avowed Slavery (August 2014)
- All Things Under Heaven (October 2015)

=== Singles ===
- "Kill Cupid With A Nail File" (2000)
- "Feed A Cat To Your Cobra" (2001)
- "Love Is Happiness" (2003)
- "Up Against The Wall, Motherfuckers" (2004)
- "Party The Baby Off" (2004)
- "On The Lash" (2004)
- "Gets Paid" (2007)
- "We Sick" / "Holy Man" (2010)
- "Bad Bloods" / "Slow Death" (2012)

=== Splits ===
- w/ Ink & Dagger ("We're Never Gonna Make It") (1998)
- w/ Burning Brides ("Angelfuck") (2002)
- w/ Pen Expers ("Raise Your Crown") (2011)
