= New Cross Inn =

Pub and music venue in Lewisham, London, England

Coordinates: 51°28′33″N 0°02′14″W

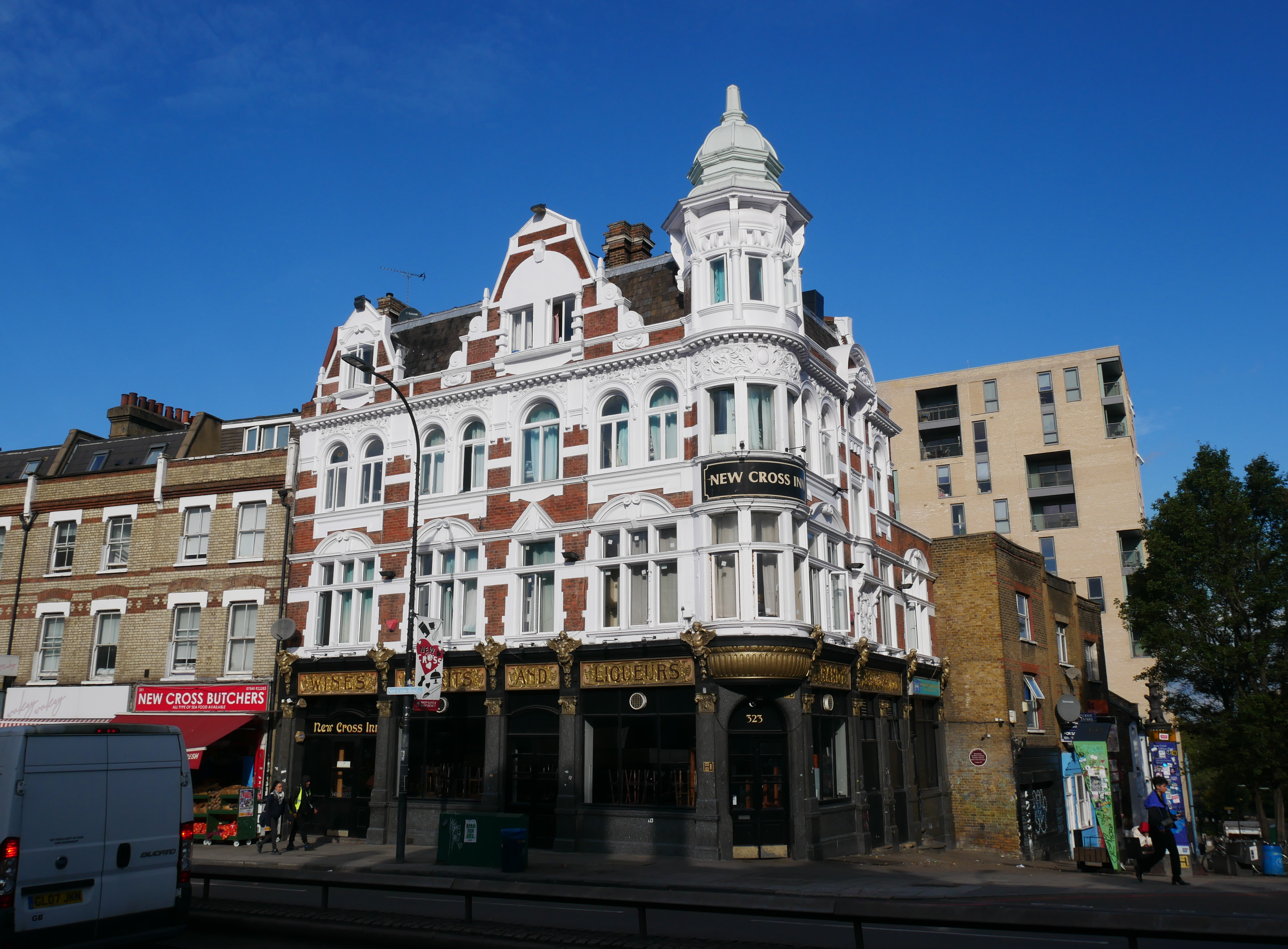
- The New Cross Inn in October 2021.
- Interactive map of New Cross Inn
- Location: 323 New Cross Rd, Lewisham, London, SE14

Construction
- Opened: 1800s

The New Cross Inn is a music venue and pub located at 323 New Cross Road, in the New Cross area of the London Borough of Lewisham, in south-east London.

== History ==
A pub with that name has existed in that area since at least the late 1700s, though the current building is estimated to be from the late 1800s. Dickens's Dictionary of the Thames from 1880 refers to an angling society based there.

In the 1890s a political group named the International Anarchist Agitator Group organised a 'Social Evening' at the pub during which songs were played on piano, followed by Anarchist declarations and speeches.

The pub was briefly called Bar Alchemy in the 2000s before reverting.

In the late 2000s, around the time of new rave's popularity in the music press and the Angular Recording Corporation bringing attention to the area, it first became known as an alternative music venue. By the 2010s it had become more known for punk rock and ska punk.

In the mid 2010s, the venue was refurbished which included the opening of a second late night bar and in-house bookings were taken over by Be Sharp Promotions and Upsurge Bookings, with both prioritising international touring bands, whilst nurturing local talent and new acts. Upsurge specialise in Hardcore punk, Heavy metal music and Hip-hop, whilst Be Sharp specialise in Punk Rock, Ska Punk and Emo

After the COVID-19 lockdowns, the pub changed exclusively into a Music venue and late night bar, hosting live music 7 days a week which includes multiple weekend festivals throughout the year and is considered a staple of underground alternative scenes in the UK

== Notable performers ==
- 88 Fingers Louie
- Adolescents (band)
- The Aggrolites
- Apologies, I Have None
- Authority Zero
- A Wilhelm Scream
- Bad Cop/Bad Cop
- Basement (band)
- The Beat
- The Bennies
- Better Lovers
- Big D and the Kids Table
- The Bombpops
- The Bronx (band)
- Cancer Bats
- Catbite
- Ceremony (punk band)
- Conflict (band)
- Consumed (band)
- The Copyrights
- Crazy Town
- Days N' Daze
- Death by Stereo
- Direct Hit!
- The Dirty Nil
- Discharge
- The Dopamines
- Drain (punk band)
- Earth Crisis
- Extreme Noise Terror
- Fiddlehead
- Fleshwater
- Fresh
- Get Dead
- Goldfinger
- Goldie Lookin Chain
- Grade 2 (band)
- Green Lung
- Hacktivist (band)
- (Hed) P.E.
- High Vis
- Jaya the Cat
- King Prawn (band)
- Koyo (band)
- Krakatoa (band)
- Kunt and the Gang
- Lightyear (band)
- Malevolence (band)
- Masked Intruder
- Mest
- Moscow Death Brigade
- Mustard Plug
- Nerf Herder
- No Fun at All
- Obie Trice
- Off with Their Heads (band)
- Origami Angel
- Pegboy
- Pete Doherty
- Petrol Girls
- Pkew pkew pkew
- The Planet Smashers
- Poison the Well (band)
- Prince Daddy & the Hyena
- Pulley (band)
- Random Hand
- Rehasher
- Red City Radio
- Salem (British punk band)
- Samiam
- Satanic Surfers
- The Selecter
- The Slackers
- Snuff (British band)
- Space (English band)
- Spanish Love Songs
- Speed (Australian band)
- Spunge
- Sonic Boom Six
- The Story So Far (band)
- The Suicide Machines
- The Supersuckers
- Strung Out
- The Toasters
- Teenage Bottlerocket
- Terror (band)
- Torche (band)
- Wargasm
- War on Women
- Vein.fm
- Voodoo Glow Skulls
- Zebrahead
- Zeke (band)
