= Jeanna Fine =

American pornographic film actress (1964–2025)

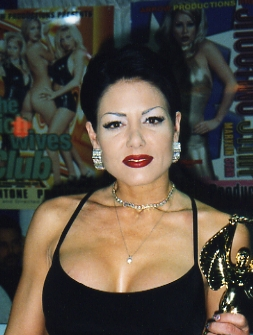
- Fine accepting an AVN Award in 2000
- Born: September 29, 1964; New York City, U.S.
- Died: October 2025 (aged 61)
- Occupations: Actress; pornographic film actress

Jeanna Fine (September 29, 1964 – October 2025) was an American pornographic film actress.

== Early life ==
Fine was born on September 29, 1964 in New York State.

== Career ==
Fine joined the adult film industry in her early 20s. She starred in the films Skin Hunger (1995), My Surrender (1996), and Cafe Flesh 2 (1997). She was inducted into the AVN Hall of Fame in 1997. She is also in the X-Rated Critic's Association's Hall of Fame.

Fine had a small role in the 1999 film The Boondock Saints as a dancer.

An interview with Fine was featured on the 2014 album Try Me by American post-hardcore band Self Defense Family. The 40-minute interview split between two tracks focuses on her childhood and early adulthood before she entered the pornography industry.

== Personal life and death ==
Fine became involved in a long-term relationship with fellow pornographic film actress Savannah. In a 1999 interview following the airing of the E! True Hollywood Story about Savannah's life and death, Fine commented, "We had an ongoing, on-again, off-again, volatile, loving relationship. At that time I was having a lot of problems myself. Between [Sikki] Nixx and Savannah pushing and pulling, I pretty much at one point ran away from them both. I couldn't take it any longer. But I feel I left her behind when she needed me most. It's very sad."

Fine died in October 2025 from heart failure, less than a week after her 61st birthday. Her death was announced by her friend and former roommate Thomas Taliaferro, who performed in pornographic films under the name Tom Byron.

== Awards ==
Year	Ceremony	Award	Work
1988	XRCO Award	Incendiary Interracial	—N/a
1991	XRCO Award	Best Actress	Steal Breeze
1992	AVN Award	Best Actress (Note: Click "select all" to read blue-on-black text on archived page)	Hothouse Rose
1992	XRCO Award	Best Actress	Brandy and Alexander
1992	XRCO Award	Female Performer of the Year	—N/a
—N/a	XRCO Award	Hall of Fame	—N/a
1996	XRCO Award	Best Actress, Single Performance	Skin Hunger
1996	AVN Award	Best Actress, Film	Skin Hunger
1996	AVN Award	Best Supporting Actress—Video	Dear Diary
1997	AVN Award	Hall of Fame	—N/a
1997	AVN Award	Best Non-Sexual Role – Bi, Gay Or Trans Video	Flesh and Blood
1997	AVN Award	Best Actress, Video	My Surrender
1997	XRCO Award	Best Actress, Single Performance	My Surrender
1997	F.O.X.E. Award	Female Fan Favorite	—N/a
1998	XRCO Award	Best Girl-Girl Sex Scene with Tiffany Mynx & Stephanie Swift	Miscreants
1998	AVN Award	Best Supporting Actress, Video	Miscreants
1998	AVN Award	Best All-Girl Sex Scene, Video	Cellar Dwellers 2
1999	AVN Award	Best Actress, Video	Cafe Flesh 2
1999	XRCO Award	Best Actress, Single Performance	Cafe Flesh 2
