= Try Me =

Try Me may refer to:

== Albums ==
- Try Me!, an album by James Brown and The Famous Flames
- Try Me (Rosie Gaines album), 1994
- Try Me (Self Defense Family album), 2014

== Songs ==
- "Try Me" (Dej Loaf song), 2014
- "Try Me" (DJ Snake song), 2019
- "Try Me" (James Brown song), 1958
- "Try Me" (Jasmine Guy song), 1990
- "Try Me" (Jason Derulo song), featuring Jennifer Lopez and Matoma, 2015
- "Try Me" (John Entwistle song), 1981
- "Try Me" (The Weeknd song), 2018
- "Try Me (Watashi wo Shinjite)", the fifth single by Namie Amuro with Super Monkey's
- "Try Me", by The Grass Roots on their album Powers of the Night, 1982
- "Try Me", by McLean
- "Try Me", by UFO on their album Lights Out, 1977
- "Try Me", by Plastic Toy and DJ Snake from the latter's album Carte Blanche, 2019

== Other ==
- Try Me Records, a record label founded by James Brown

== See also ==
- Try (disambiguation)
- "Try to Find Me", a song by Gorky Park, 1989
