= Superheaven =

American alternative rock band

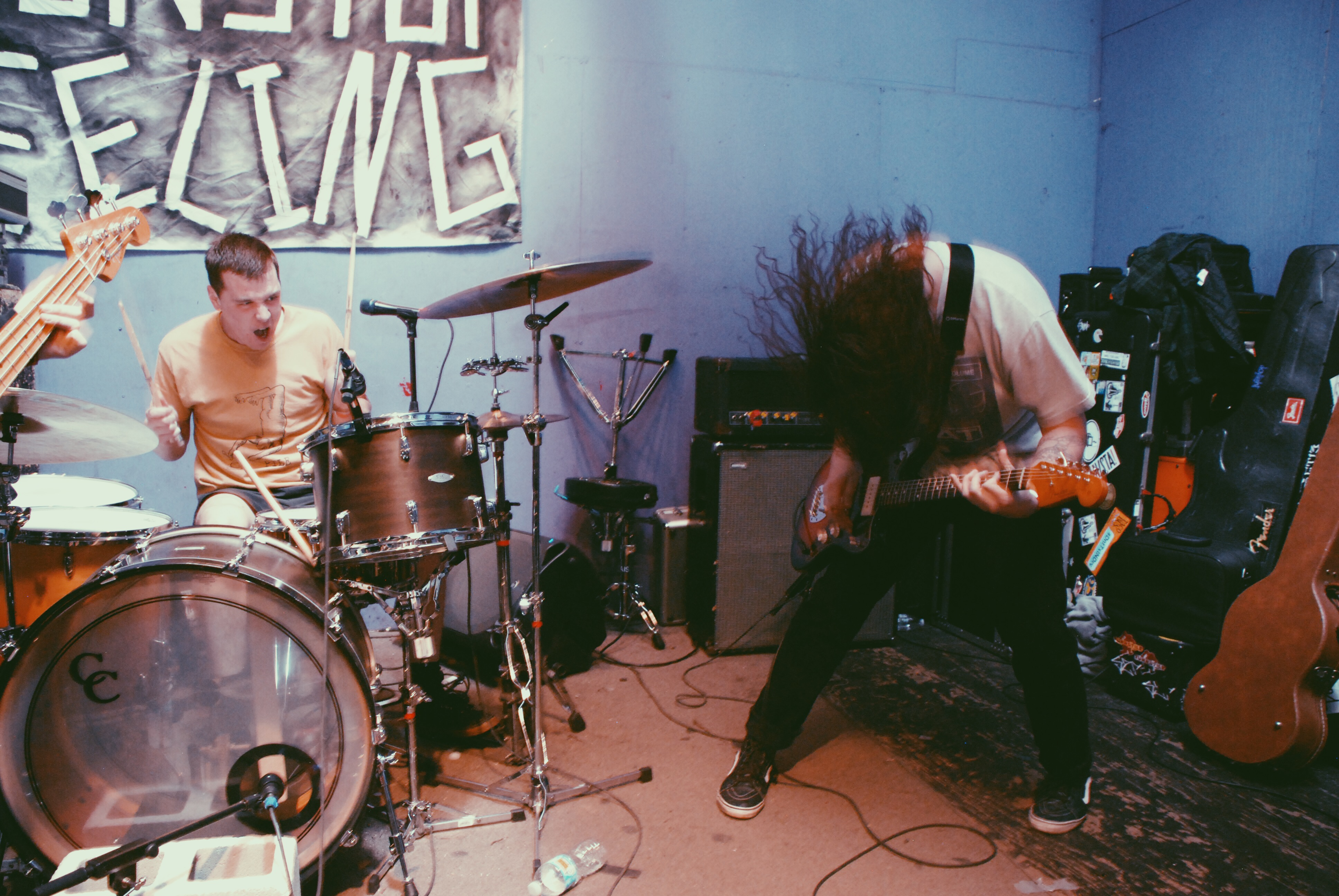
- Superheaven live in February 2015

Background information
- Also known as: Daylight (2008–2014)
- Origin: Doylestown, Pennsylvania, U.S.
- Genres: Grunge; alternative rock; post-hardcore; soft grunge; emo; grungegaze; shoegaze
- Years active: 2008–2016; 2022–present; (Reunions: 2017, 2018, 2019)
- Labels: Blue Grape Music; SideOneDummy; Run for Cover; Six Feet Under; Get This Right
- Members: Taylor Madison; Jake Clarke; Joe Kane; Zack Robbins
- Past members: John Bowes
- Website: www.superheaven.net

Superheaven, formerly known as Daylight, is an American alternative rock band from Doylestown, Pennsylvania, that formed in 2008. Their music has been described as reminiscent of 1990s grunge.

== History ==
As Daylight, the band formed early in 2008 and released their debut extended play Sinking in 2009 via Get This Right Records; the EP is a remixed and remastered version of the band's demo. They released their second EP Dispirit in 2010 via Six Feet Under Records, and their third, The Difference in Good and Bad Dreams, in 2012 via Run for Cover Records (together with an acoustic EP). Their debut studio album Jar was released in April 2013 on the same label and reached number 184 on the US Billboard 200 chart. The band was featured on Alternative Press's list of "39 up-and-coming bands you must check out before 2013 ends". Following a legal dispute with a Spanish band of the same name, Daylight changed their name to Superheaven in early 2014. Despite the change, guitarist and vocalist Taylor Madison emphasized that their musical direction and lineup remained consistent. Later the same year, the band signed to SideOneDummy Records. They released their second album Ours Is Chrome in May 2015.

In mid-2015, Superheaven embarked on a North American tour alongside Diamond Youth and Rozwell Kid, promoting Ours Is Chrome. Following the end of their tour in support of Ours is Chrome, the band ceased full-time activity. Recorded in October 2014 with producer Will Yip, Ours Is Chrome marked a period of growth for the band. Madison noted that, compared to their previous album Jar, the band had a clearer vision for their sound and songwriting during this recording. Madison and Clarke formed a new band, Webbed Wing, in 2017. Their debut album, Bike Ride Across the Moon, was released in 2019. Robbins formed DARK MTNS with Gunk's Josh Mackie, releasing their debut album Up Above This Cloud in 2017. He also played in the band Flight Habit. Kane largely retired from music and started his own carpentry business, Cliffside Carpenter.

The band did, however, play several one-off reunion shows in the following years. In December 2017, Superheaven played a secret set alongside Tigers Jaw and Turnstile for a charity event for Philabundance, put on by music producer Will Yip. A few days after, the band announced a one-off show benefitting Planned Parenthood on March 2, 2018, at The Other Side in Wilkes Barre, Pennsylvania. They also played with Balance and Composure on their final tour in 2019.

Superheaven again reunited in 2022 to play Manchester's Outbreak Fest in June – alongside Turnstile, Knocked Loose, and Basement – as well as playing at London's New Cross Inn. In November 2022, it was announced the band would play Sick New World fest in Las Vegas in May 2023. This was followed by a full tour announcement in January 2023, where the band celebrated the ten-year anniversary of Jar. During 2023, Superheaven experienced a surge in popularity through "Youngest Daughter" (2013) going viral on TikTok, reaching number three on the Billboard Hot Hard Rock Songs chart.

On November 12, 2024, Superheaven released the song "Long Gone", the band's first new release since Ours is Chrome in 2015. The follow up single "Numb to What Is Real" was released on December 10; that same day, the band announced that their third studio album will be self-titled with a release date of April 18, 2025. On February 18, 2025, Superheaven announced their 16 stop tour in North America. Their first stop of the tour is LDB Fest in Louisville, Kentucky. Their headlining dates started on April 27 in St. Louis and run through May 20 in Brooklyn, New York. After concert dates in Europe starting on June 8, they are set to come back to the U.S. to finish their 2025 tour at the three-day music festival, Louder Than Life in Louisville, Kentucky.

== Musical style and influences ==
Critics have categorized Superheaven's music as grunge, emo, alternative rock, post-hardcore, and soft grunge. They were a central band to the emo revival. Taylor Madison has particularly pushed back against the categorization of Superheaven as shoegaze, stating in a 2015 interview with The Aquarian Weekly that "it definitely confuses me that someone would call us a 'shoegaze band' or anything like that because when I think of shoegaze, I think of My Bloody Valentine, you know what I mean? I don’t think we sound like that at all." In an interview with Fuse Maddison stated:

I would never describe our music to someone as "grunge." I certainly wouldn't describe us as "shoegaze" either, but it seems like that one is getting thrown around a lot lately. I won't sit here and say certain labels don't annoy me, because it definitely gets to the point where I'll see someone call us "pop-punk," or something, and I'm left thinking "damn, really? Do we sound like that?" But in the end, I do think people get too into the label thing. When someone asks what our band sounds like, I tell them "rock 'n' roll." We are a rock band. That's it.

Superheaven have cited Bayside, Hot Water Music, Boys Night Out, Far, Hum, the Pixies and Weezer as influences. In a 2024 interview with BrooklynVegan, Madison stated "I tend to be influenced more by my friends and the things they're doing in music... I don't listen to as much music as I should".

They have been cited as an influence by Pity Sex, Milk Teeth, Glare, Split Chain, Modern Error and Quannnic.

== Band members ==
Current

- Taylor Madison – lead vocals, rhythm guitar (2008–2016, 2017, 2018, 2019, 2022–present)
- Jake Clarke – lead guitar, co-lead vocals (2008–2016, 2017, 2018, 2019, 2022–present)
- Joe Kane – bass (2008–2016, 2017, 2018, 2019, 2022–present)
- Zack Robbins – drums, backing vocals (2012–2016, 2017, 2018, 2019, 2022–present); rhythm guitar, keyboards (2024)

Former

- John Bowes – drums (2008–2012)

Timeline

== Discography ==
=== Studio albums ===
Year	Album	Label	Peak chart positions			
Year	Album	Label	US	US Alt	US Indie	US Rock
2013	Jar	Run for Cover	184	—	33	50
2015	Ours Is Chrome	Side One Dummy/Red Bull	—	16	12	25
2025	Superheaven	Blue Grape Music	—	—	—	—
"—" denotes that the recording did not chart

=== Extended plays ===
Year	Album	Label
2009	Sinking (as Daylight)	Get This Right
2010	Dispirit (as Daylight)	Six Feet Under
2011	Run for Cover Acoustic Series #3 (as Daylight)	Run for Cover
2012	The Difference in Good and Bad Dreams (as Daylight)	Run for Cover

=== Singles ===
Year	Song	Album
2011	"Damp" (as Daylight)	The Difference in Good and Bad Dreams
2013	"In on It"	Jar
2015	"I've Been Bored"	Ours Is Chrome
2015	"Next to Nothing"	Ours Is Chrome
2024	"Long Gone"	Superheaven
2024	"Numb to What Is Real"	Superheaven
2025	“Cruel Times”	Superheaven
2025	"Stare at the Void"	Superheaven

=== Other charted songs ===
Year	Song	Peak chart positions				Album
Year	Song	US Rock	US Hot Alt	US Hot Rock	Certications	Album
2013	"Youngest Daughter"	22	17	14	● RIAA: Gold● RMNZ: Gold	Jar

=== Music videos ===
Year	Song	Album
2011	"Damp" (as Daylight)	The Difference in Good and Bad Dreams
2013	"In on It"	Jar
2013	"Life in a Jar"	Jar
2013	"No One's Deserving"	Jar
2015	"I've Been Bored"	Ours Is Chrome
2015	"Next to Nothing"	Ours Is Chrome
2015	"Gushin' Blood"	Ours Is Chrome
2024	"Long Gone"	Superheaven
2025	"Cruel Times"	Superheaven
2025	"Stare at the Void"	Superheaven
