= Fear of Life =

Fear of Life may refer to:

- Fear of Life, book by Alexander Lowen 1980
- Fear of Life, album by Channel 3 (band) 1982
- Fear of Life, album by Creative Adult 2016
- "Fear of Life", song by Murray Head from Wave (Murray Head album)
