= Still Nothing Moves You =

Still, Nothing Moves You

Studio album by Ceremony
- Released: August 5, 2008
- Recorded: 2008 at Polymorph Recording Studios in Oakland, California
- Genre: Hardcore punk
- Length: 21:36 (CD)
- Label: Bridge 9
- Producer: Dan Rathbun

Ceremony chronology
Scared People (2007)	Still, Nothing Moves You (2008)	Rohnert Park (2010)

Still, Nothing Moves You is the second full-length album from the American hardcore punk band Ceremony. It was released in August 2008 through Bridge 9 Records.

== Reception ==
Professional ratings
Review scores
Source	Rating
AllMusic	3.5/5 stars
Punknews.org	3.5/5 stars
Sputnikmusic	4/5 stars

Ceremony's sophomore full-length release was received by generally favorable reviews, following high expectations set by their widely acclaimed initial releases. Critics also acknowledged the record's slight departure from the intensity of Violence Violence for a sound that was increasingly influenced by 1980s hardcore punk.

Punknews.org notes that "Ceremony have further abandoned the fuck-all, one-after-another power-violence attacks to better vary their approach, nonetheless one still indebted to rabid mid-`80s hardcore". Similarly, Sputnikmusic writes that, in comparison to Ceremony's previous releases, the songs in Still Nothing Moves You "are less spontaneous 30 second bursts of violence, and more well thought out 56 second bursts of aggression".

== Track listing ==
All tracks are written by Ceremony.

No.	Title	Length
1.	"Dead Moon California (Midnight In Solitude) / The Difference Between Looking and Seeing"	4:06
2.	"Eraser Making Its Way Its Only Job"	0:55
3.	"He - God - Has Favored Our Undertakings"	2:22
4.	"A Blight On Mental Health"	1:14
5.	"Plutocratic Swine Rake"	1:21
6.	"Vagrant"	1:20
7.	"Twenty Four Hour Fever Watch"	0:33
8.	"Entropy: No Meaning Is Also An Answer"	0:45
9.	"Carrying Flowers"	1:03
10.	"In Facile"	0:49
11.	"Overcast"	2:04
12.	"Birth. Conspire. Be. Upset"	0:59
13.	"Uneven Pavement"	0:50
14.	"Fading Sounds Of Your Life"	1:19
15.	"Learn/Without"	1:56
Total length:		21:36

== Personnel ==
- Ross Farrar – vocals
- Anthony Anzaldo – guitars
- Ryan Mattos – guitars
- Justin Davis – bass
- Jake Casarotti – drums

Technical personnel

- Dan Rathbun – producer
- Adam Rossiter – artwork
