= Spice (American band) =

SPICE
- Origin: San Francisco, California, United States
- Genres: Experimental rock; post-punk; shoegaze
- Years active: 2018–present
- Label: Dais
- Spinoff of: Ceremony; Creative Adult; No Sir; Sabertooth Zombie
- Members: Ross Farrar; Jake Casarotti; Cody Sullivan; Ian Simpson; Victoria Skudlarek
- Website: spiceispain.bandcamp.com

Spice (stylized as SPICE) is an American rock supergroup based in San Francisco, California. The band consists of Ross Farrar and Jake Casarotti of Ceremony, Ian Simpson of Creative Adult, and Cody Sullivan of Sabertooth Zombie. The band was formed in 2018, and in 2020 they released their eponymous debut album.

== Background ==
SPICE formed in 2018 with members of Ceremony, Creative Adult, Sabertooth Zombie, and No Sir. In describing the formation of the new band and their music, the band stated:

In the beginning, we were very conscious of what the shape of the record was going to be: short (thirty minutes or less), variation (a mix of short and longer songs), emotional, but not gushing, powerful, but not overt. We wanted there to be a single thread that connected everything, continuity, a sense that the record was one complete organism.

To authentically express pain can be difficult. It comes towards us every day in some shape or another, and parsing out which side to expel can prove arduous. With that, choosing what to hold that pain in, how to package it can also be hard. Then besets the question of form. In the adverse, too much sentimentality can soften form, yet too much pain — well — a good balance is due. At the onset of any artistic endeavor there is a (conscious or unconscious) search for form. Form is the vehicle’s engine, it lies beneath everything, a scaffold for content, where content stays.

— SPICE, press release

On April 29, 2020, SPICE released their debut single off of the self-titled album, called "First Feeling". The band followed up with their second single, "All My Best Shit", which came out on May 20, 2020, and later announced the debut of their album, which came out on July 17, 2020.

== Discography ==
=== Studio albums ===
- SPICE (2020)
- Viv (2022)

=== Singles ===
- "First Feeling" (2020)
- "All My Best Shit" (2020)
- "26 Dogs" (2020)
- "A Better Treatment b/w Everyone Gets In" (2021)
- "Any Day Now" (2022)
- "Bad Fade" (2022)
