= Might Be Right =

Single by White Reaper

from the album You Deserve Love
- Released: May 27, 2019
- Genre: Garage punk; power pop; indie rock
- Length: 3:56
- Label: Elektra
- Songwriters: Tony Esposito; Ryan Hater; Sam Wilkerson; Nick Wilkerson; Hunter Thompson

White Reaper singles chronology
| "The Stack" (2017) | "Might Be Right" (2019) | "Real Long Time" (2019) |

"Might Be Right" is a single by American rock band White Reaper. The single is the lead single from their third studio album, You Deserve Love. It was released on May 27, 2019, through Elektra Records.

"Might Be Right" was the first single by the band to chart. It reached number four on Billboard's Adult Alternative Airplay chart in December 2019 before topping the same publication's Alternative Airplay chart in February 2020. In February 2021, for the 25th anniversary of Adult Alternative Airplay, Billboard published a ranking of the 100 most successful songs in the chart's history; "Might Be Right" was placed at number 83.

== Music video ==
The music video for "Might Be Right" came out on May 27, 2019. The music video was directed by Daniel Ryan and produced by Jonah Mueller. The video shows the band playing in a room with a neon sign saying the band's initials "WR" in the background.

== Charts ==
=== Weekly charts ===
| Chart (2019–2020) | Peak position |
|---|---|
| Canada Rock (Billboard) | 6 |
| US Hot Rock & Alternative Songs (Billboard) | 6 |
| US Rock & Alternative Airplay (Billboard) | 2 |

=== Year-end charts ===
| Chart (2020) | Position |
|---|---|
| US Hot Rock & Alternative Songs (Billboard) | 51 |
| US Rock Airplay (Billboard) | 17 |
