= Blue Grape Music =

Independent record label Blue Grape Music

- Type: Independent
- Industry: Music
- Genre: Rock; Heavy metal; Hardcore punk; Alternative rock
- Founded: 2022
- Founders: David Rath; Cees Wessels
- Headquarters: New York City, New York, U.S. Amsterdam, Netherlands
- Area served: Worldwide
- Products: Music releases; Global distribution via The Orchard
- Website: bluegrapemusic.com

Blue Grape Music is an American independent record label specializing in rock, metal, and alternative music. Headquartered in New York City, with European operations based in Amsterdam, the company was founded in late 2022 by former Roadrunner Records executives David Rath and Cees Wessels. The label's releases are distributed globally by The Orchard, a subsidiary of Sony Music.

== History ==
The label was established by industry veterans with a “long—and loud—history” in heavy music. Co-founder Cees Wessels originally founded Roadrunner Records in the Netherlands in 1980, while David Rath served as the head of A&R at Roadrunner for over twenty years, overseeing the careers of prominent acts including Slipknot, Nickelback, Theory of a Deadman, Killswitch Engage, Gojira, and Turnstile. The name “Blue Grape" was chosen because it was "familiar to rock music fans, as it was the merchandise company also launched by Wessels,” which handled official merchandise for major Roadrunner acts.

Blue Grape Music officially launched publicly in February 2023, and announced its inaugural band signing, the two-time Grammy Award-nominated hardcore punk band Code Orange. According to co-founder Rath, the rock label’s founding vision would be to help developing bands and artists who need “more resources than a very small indie label can provide, but who are not quite ready to step up to a major,” and then provide A&R expertise to “help the signed acts record their music in the way they envision.”

In the four years since its initial launch with Code Orange, the label has steadily expanded its roster by signing independent alternative, rock, and hardcore punk acts.

== Roster ==
The following table lists some of the more prominent artists signed to Blue Grape Music, along with their signing year, key releases, and notable background information.

Artist	Year Signed	Key Label Release(s)	Notes	Ref.
Code Orange	2023	The Above (2023)	Hardcore punk / metalcore band. Inaugural label signing. Album reviewed by Kerrang and Pop Matters.	
Spiritual Cramp	2023	Spiritual Cramp (2023) Rude (2025)	Punk / post-punk band. Albums reviews in New Noise Magazine and Kerrang.	
Gel	2024	Persona (2024)	Hardcore punk band. Album reviewed by Kerrang and Pitchfork.	
Superheaven	2024	Long Gone (2024)	Alternative rock band. Single is first musical release in nine years, followed by self-titled album.	
White Reaper	2025	Only Slightly Empty (2025)	Garage rock / garage punk band. Album reviewed by SPIN and Kerrang.	
Bike Routes	2025	Prairie (2026)	Indie / alt / emo rock band. Reviewed by Hive Magazine.	
Fugitive	2025	"Spheres of Virulence" (2025)	Thrash metal / crossover thrash band. Single	
Silly Goose	2025	Keys to the City (2025)	Nu metal / rap rock band. Reviewed by New Noise Magazine	
