= Ours Is Chrome =

Studio album by Superheaven
- Released: May 4, 2015
- Recorded: October 2014
- Studios: Studio 4 Recording Studios, West Conshohocken, Pennsylvania
- Genres: Alternative rock; soft grunge; grungegaze; emo; grunge
- Length: 43:00
- Labels: Side One Dummy, Red Bull
- Producer: Will Yip

Superheaven chronology
Jar (2013)	Ours Is Chrome (2015)	Superheaven (2025)

Singles from Ours Is Chrome
- 1. "I've Been Bored" Released: March 24, 2015; 2. "Next to Nothing" Released: April 9, 2015

Professional ratings
Aggregate scores
Source	Rating
Metacritic	69/100
Review scores
Source	Rating
AllMusic	3/5 stars
Exclaim!	9/10 stars
PopMatters	3/5 stars
Punknews.org	2.5/5 stars

Ours Is Chrome is the second studio album by American alternative rock band Superheaven. Released on May 4, 2015, it was the final album released before going on a 6-year long hiatus in 2016, ending in 2022. The snake on the cover is a DeKay's brown snake (Storeria dekayi).

== Musical style ==
Ours Is Chrome has been labelled as an alternative rock, grungegaze, grunge, and emo grunge album.

== Track listing ==
All music is composed by Superheaven.

No.	Title	Length
1.	"I've Been Bored"	3:23
2.	"Next to Nothing"	4:04
3.	"Room"	3:37
4.	"All the Pain"	4:14
5.	"Leach"	3:50
6.	"Downswing"	3:41
7.	"Blur"	3:23
8.	"Gushin' Blood"	3:29
9.	"Dig Into Me"	3:35
10.	"From the Chest Down"	6:06
11.	"Poor Aileen"	4:27
Total length:		43:00

== Personnel ==
Superheaven

- Taylor Madison – lead vocals, rhythm guitar
- Jake Clarke – lead guitar, backing vocals
- Joe Kane – bass
- Zack Robbins – drums

Additional personnel

- Will Yip – production, mixing, backing vocals, additional percussion
- Matthew Bailey – additional percussion
- Vince Ratti – mixing
- Jay Preston – assisting engineering

== Charts ==
Chart (2015)	Peak position
US Top Alternative Albums (Billboard)	16
US Independent Albums (Billboard)	12
US Top Rock Albums (Billboard)	25
