= In the Spirit World Now =

Studio album by Ceremony
- Released: August 23, 2019
- Genres: Post-punk; new wave
- Length: 32:15
- Label: Relapse

Ceremony chronology
The L-Shaped Man (2015)	In the Spirit World Now (2019)	Tell me Your Dream (2026)

Professional ratings
Aggregate scores
Source	Rating
Metacritic	71/100
Review scores
Source	Rating
AllMusic	3/5 stars
Consequence of Sound	B
Exclaim!	7/10

In the Spirit World Now is the sixth studio album by American punk rock band Ceremony. It was released through Relapse Records on August 23, 2019.

== Critical reception ==
In the Spirit World Now was met with generally favorable reviews from critics. At Metacritic, which assigns a weighted average rating out of 100 to reviews from mainstream publications, this release received an average score of 71, based on 7 reviews.

== Track listing ==
No.	Title	Length
1.	"Turn Away the Bad Thing"	4:02
2.	"In the Spirit World Now"	3:14
3.	"Further I Was"	3:34
4.	"/"	0:18
5.	"Presaging the End"	4:21
6.	"Say Goodbye to Them"	2:28
7.	"We Can Be Free"	2:24
8.	"//"	0:17
9.	"Years of Love"	2:13
10.	"Never Gonna Die Now"	1:16
11.	"I Want More"	2:35
12.	"From Another Age"	2:41
13.	"///"	0:11
14.	"Calming Water"	2:42

== Charts ==
Chart (2019)	Peak position
US Heatseekers Albums (Billboard)	5
US Independent Albums (Billboard)	21
