= You Deserve Love =

Studio album by White Reaper
- Released: October 18, 2019
- Recorded: Fall 2018 – Spring 2019
- Genres: Garage rock; glam rock
- Length: 29:48
- Label: Elektra
- Producer: Jay Joyce

White Reaper chronology
The World's Best American Band (2017)	You Deserve Love (2019)	Asking for a Ride (2023)

Singles from You Deserve Love
- 1. "Might Be Right" Released: May 29, 2019; 2. "Real Long Time" Released: July 24, 2019; 3. "1F" Released: August 27, 2019

You Deserve Love is the third studio album by American rock band, White Reaper. The album was released through Elektra Records on October 18, 2019.

== Background ==
Following the conclusion of their tour with The Struts in the autumn of 2018, White Reaper began recording new material for a third studio album. On May 29, 2019, the lead-off single for You Deserve Love, called "Might Be Right" was released. The second single, "Real Long Time" came out two months later. On August 27, 2019, the album was announced with the third single, "1F". In describing the album name, bassist Sam Wilkerson said “Everyone stopped me at You Deserve Love,” he says. “I think it’s cool, because it’s true for everybody. I think it’s what everybody needs to hear.”

== Critical reception ==
Professional ratings
Aggregate scores
Source	Rating
Metacritic	77/100
Review scores
Source	Rating
AllMusic	4/5 stars
Pitchfork	6.8/10

You Deserve Love was met with "generally favorable" reviews from critics. At Metacritic, which assigns a weighted average rating out of 100 to reviews from mainstream publications, this release received an average score of 77, based on 7 reviews. Loudwire named it one of the 50 best rock albums of 2019.

== Track listing ==
Adapted from Apple Music.

No.	Title	Length
1.	"Headwind"	2:38
2.	"Real Long Time"	3:17
3.	"Saturday"	2:57
4.	"1F"	3:00
5.	"Hard Luck"	3:59
6.	"Raw"	2:35
7.	"Might Be Right"	3:57
8.	"Eggplant"	2:31
9.	"Ring"	2:17
10.	"You Deserve Love"	2:37
Total length:		29:48

== Personnel ==
Credits adapted from Tidal.

Musicians

- Tony Esposito – guitar (all tracks), vocals (all tracks)
- Nick Wilkerson – drums (all tracks), percussion (tracks 2, 3, 7, 8, 9)
- Sam Wilkerson – bass (all tracks)
- Hunter Thompson – guitar (all tracks)
- Ryan Hater – keyboard (all tracks)

Personnel

- Jay Joyce – producer, mixer (all tracks)
- Joe LaPorta – mastering
- Chris Taylor – assistant engineer (all tracks)
- Jimmy Mansfield – assistant engineer (all tracks)
- Jason Hall – engineer
