= Creative Adult =

American rock band

- Origin: North Bay, San Francisco, California, United States
- Genres: Post-hardcore, post-punk, alternative rock, punk rock
- Years active: 2012–present
- Labels: Run For Cover, Broke Hatrè
- Spinoffs: Self Defense Family; SPICE; Spiritual Cramp
- Members: Scott Phillips; RJ Phillips; James Rogers; Anthony Anzaldo
- Past members: Michael Bingham; Michael Fenton

Creative Adult is an American rock band formed in 2012 in the North Bay, California.

== History ==
Creative Adult began in 2012 with the release of their debut EP titled Dead Air via their own Broke Hatrè Records. They released their second EP titled Bulls In The Yard the following year.

In 2014, the band released the 'Deep End' single. Also in 2014, the band released their debut full-length album titled Psychic Mess via Run For Cover, having traveled to Montreal's Hotel2Tango to record with Efrim Menuck. The album received generally favorable reviews, NME citing the band's "exploratory, intense" nature.

In 2015 the band released a split 7-inch EP with Self Defense Family, both bands contributing one song. They also released a split with the band Wild Moth, as well as the Ring Around The Room EP.

The band has toured the United States with acts such as Ceremony, Self Defense Family, Japanther, Makthaverskan, Tony Molina, and Soulside.

In 2016, Michael Bingham and Michael Fenton left the band to create Spiritual Cramp.

== Members ==
- Scott Phillips
- RJ Phillips
- Michael Bingham
- James Rogers
- Michael Fenton
- Anthony Anzaldo

== Discography ==
Studio albums

- Psychic Mess (2014, Run for Cover)
- Fear of Life (2016, Run for Cover)

EPs

- Dead Air (2012, Broke Hatrè)
- Bulls in the Yard (2013, Run for Cover)
- Ring Around the Room (2015, Run for Cover)

Singles

- "Northern Exile" (2013, Broke Hatrè)
- "Deep End" (2014, Run for Cover)

Splits

- Creative Adult/Self Defense Family (2015, Deathwish Inc.)
- Creative Adult/Wild Moth (2015, Broke Hatrè)
