= Only Constant =

Studio album by Gel
- Released: March 31, 2023
- Recorded: January–June 2022
- Studio: Landmine Studios
- Genre: Hardcore punk
- Length: 16:26
- Language: English
- Label: Convulse

Gel chronology
Violent Closure (2021)	Only Constant (2023)	Persona (2024)

I wanted it to be like, fast but not fastcore, stompy and tough but not like oi! I think a lot of the bands that we were listening to when we were doing it was stuff like Hoax, which has pretty specific guitar riffs, and I didn’t know how to write stuff like that. I’m not saying I finally landed on that, but what I wanted was everything to be simple but still really catchy. A catchy riff is something that I’ve always been striving to do, and I think that’s what we did on this record. It’s rooted in [the] ’80s hardcore [approach of] most songs are two riffs, maybe a third riff, and it’s kinda just that. Two good riffs could be a whole song if they hold up, and I think that they all hold up.

—Guitarist Anthony Webster on the sound of Only Constant

Only Constant is the only studio album by American punk band Gel.

== Reception ==
Paul Dika of Exclaim! gave this album a 7 out of 10, calling it "all killer and no filler", displaying "a band with a keen sense of their sound and an understanding of what makes them so appealing to listeners". Kerrang!'s Nick Ruskell scored Only Constant a 5 out of 5, characterizing it as "exciting, exhilarating, cathartic, joyous, and impossible to resist". At Louder Than War, Jazz Hodge gave this release 5 out of 5 bombs, writing that it "is everything you want from a hardcore album. It’s chaotic, it’s full of melodic curveballs and all the songs are averaging about 1 and a half minutes long. There’s rarely a moment of peace in terms its aggression but the consistently tasteful and rage-fuelled drumming compliments all the unhinged moments with perfected structure. Redirecting their frustrations into works of punk-art, Gel are pathing the way for a new breed of hardcore." Brad Sanders of Pitchfork scored the album a 7.3 out of 10, comparing the music favorably to Slayer.

In June 2023, Alternative Press published an unranked list of the top 25 albums of the year to date and included this release, publishing that "their lyrics relay positive, personal messages of self-confidence and of the journey to sobriety, though as far as we know, they have yet to play a set that doesn’t get the sweatiest, hardest crowd really going". This was rated the sixth best hardcore album of 2023 by Stereogum. Editors at Revolver ranked this the seventh best hardcore album of 2023.

== Track listing ==
All songs written by Gel, all lyrics by Samantha Kaiser.

1. "Honed Blade" – 1:40
2. "Fortified" – 1:30
3. "Attainable" – 1:43
4. "Out of Mind" – 1:07
5. "Dicey" – 1:24
6. "Calling Card" – 1:57
7. "The Way Out" – 0:53
8. "Worn Down" – 1:27
9. "Snake Skin" – 1:29
10. "Composure" – 3:15

== Personnel ==
Gel

- Matthew Bobko – bass guitar
- Sami Kaiser – vocals
- Zachary Miller – drums, engineering, mixing
- Maddi Nave – guitar
- Anthony Webster – guitar

Additional personnel

- Trish Quigley – engineer, production
- Will Killingsworth – mastering at Dead Air Studios
- Ryan Rocha – artwork

== See also ==
- List of 2023 albums
