= Superheaven (album) =

Studio album by Superheaven
- Released: April 18, 2025
- Studio: The Metal Shop (Philadelphia)
- Genres: Alternative rock; grunge; shoegaze
- Length: 31:00
- Label: Blue Grape
- Producer: Superheaven

Superheaven chronology
Ours Is Chrome (2015)	Superheaven (2025)

Singles from Superheaven
- 1. "Long Gone" Released: November 12, 2024; 2. "Numb to What Is Real" Released: December 10, 2024; 3. "Cruel Times" Released: February 20, 2025; 4. "Stare at the Void" Released: March 20, 2025

Superheaven is the third studio album by American alternative rock band Superheaven, released on April 18, 2025. The album marks the band's return after their previous hiatus and is their first album in 10 years, following 2015's Ours Is Chrome.

== Track listing ==
All tracks are written by Taylor Madison, Jacob Clarke, Zack Robbins, and Joseph Kane.

No.	Title	Length
1.	"Humans for Toys"	2:30
2.	"Numb to What Is Real"	2:49
3.	"Cruel Times"	2:58
4.	"Sounds of Goodbyes"	3:17
5.	"Long Gone"	3:31
6.	"Hothead"	1:32
7.	"Conflicted Mood"	2:38
8.	"Stare at the Void"	3:52
9.	"Next Time"	3:57
10.	"The Curtain"	3:56
Total length:		31:00

== Personnel ==
Credits adapted from the album's liner notes.

=== Superheaven ===
- Taylor Madison – lead vocals, rhythm guitar
- Jacob Clarke – lead guitar, co-lead vocals
- Joseph Kane – bass
- Zack Robbins – drums, backing vocals, additional guitars, synthesizers

=== Additional contributors ===
- Superheaven – production
- Jacob Clarke – engineering
- Taylor Madison – layout, design
- Zack Robbins – engineering
- Rich Costey – mixing
- Jeff Citron – mixing assistance
- Will Yip – additional vocal production and engineering
- Howie Weinberg – mastering
- Simon Heller – cover
- Mike Paulshock – photos

== Charts ==
Chart performance for Superheaven
Chart (2025)	Peak position
UK Album Downloads (Official Charts)	72
UK Independent Albums (Official Charts)	39
UK Rock & Metal Albums (Official Charts)	24
