= Jar (album) =

Studio album by Superheaven
- Released: April 30, 2013
- Recorded: December 2012
- Studios: Studio 4 Recording Studios, West Conshohocken, Pennsylvania
- Genres: Grunge; soft grunge
- Length: 41:25
- Label: Run for Cover
- Producer: Will Yip

Superheaven chronology
| The Difference in Good and Bad Dreams (2012) | Jar (2013) | Ours Is Chrome (2015) |

Original Pressing
- Pre-name change artwork

Singles from Jar
- 1. "In on It" Released: March 21, 2013

Professional ratings
Review scores
| Source | Rating |
|---|---|
| AbsolutePunk | 8.0 |
| Punk News | 4.5/5 stars |
| Punk Rock Theory | 7.0/10 |

Jar is the debut studio album by American alternative rock band Superheaven, released on April 30, 2013. It was originally released under the band's prior name, Daylight, which has since been changed due to a legal dispute. The album peaked at #184 on the US Billboard 200.

On January 10, 2023, Superheaven announced that they would go on a small tour of the East and West Coasts in honor of the album's 10th anniversary.

== Background and recording ==
Superheaven formed in 2008 under the name Daylight. The group released its debut EP Sinking in 2009 through Get This Right Records. The band's second EP, Dispirit, was released in 2010 through Six Feet Under Records. The band would release a third EP, The Difference in Good and Bad Dreams, in 2012 through Run for Cover Records. Later that year, drummer John Bowes left the band was replaced by Zack Robbins.

The band would record its debut album, Jar, with producer Will Yip in December 2012.

A music video for the song "In on It" was released on March 21, 2013. A music video was released for "Life in a Jar" on April 30, the same day the album was released. The album's third video, "No One's Deserving", was released on November 21.

== Track listing ==
All music is composed by Superheaven.

| No. | Title | Length |
|---|---|---|
| 1. | "Sponge" | 4:23 |
| 2. | "Life in a Jar" | 3:42 |
| 3. | "Outside of Me" | 2:31 |
| 4. | "Sheltered" | 2:41 |
| 5. | "Crawl" | 2:33 |
| 6. | "Last October" | 3:52 |
| 7. | "Youngest Daughter" | 4:09 |
| 8. | "Knew" | 1:18 |
| 9. | "No One's Deserving" | 3:03 |
| 10. | "Hole in the Ground" | 4:31 |
| 11. | "In on It" | 3:23 |
| 12. | "Around the Railing" | 5:09 |
| Total length: | | 41:25 |

10th Anniversary Edition LP bonus tracks
| No. | Title | Length |
|---|---|---|
| 13. | "Lucky" |
| 14. | "Siblings" |

== Personnel ==
=== Superheaven ===
- Taylor Madison – lead vocals, rhythm guitar
- Jake Clarke – lead guitar, co-lead vocals
- Joe Kane – bass
- Zack Robbins – drums, backing vocals

=== Additional personnel ===
- Will Yip – production, engineering, mixing, mastering, additional percussion
- Shelly Weiss – strings
- Vince Ratti – mixing
- Jay Preston – studio assistant
- Alex Henery – artwork, layout, photography

== Charts ==
| Chart (2013) | Peak position |
|---|---|
| US Billboard 200 | 184 |
| US Heatseekers Albums (Billboard) | 3 |
| US Independent Albums (Billboard) | 33 |
| US Top Rock Albums (Billboard) | 50 |
