= Gel (band) =

American hardcore band

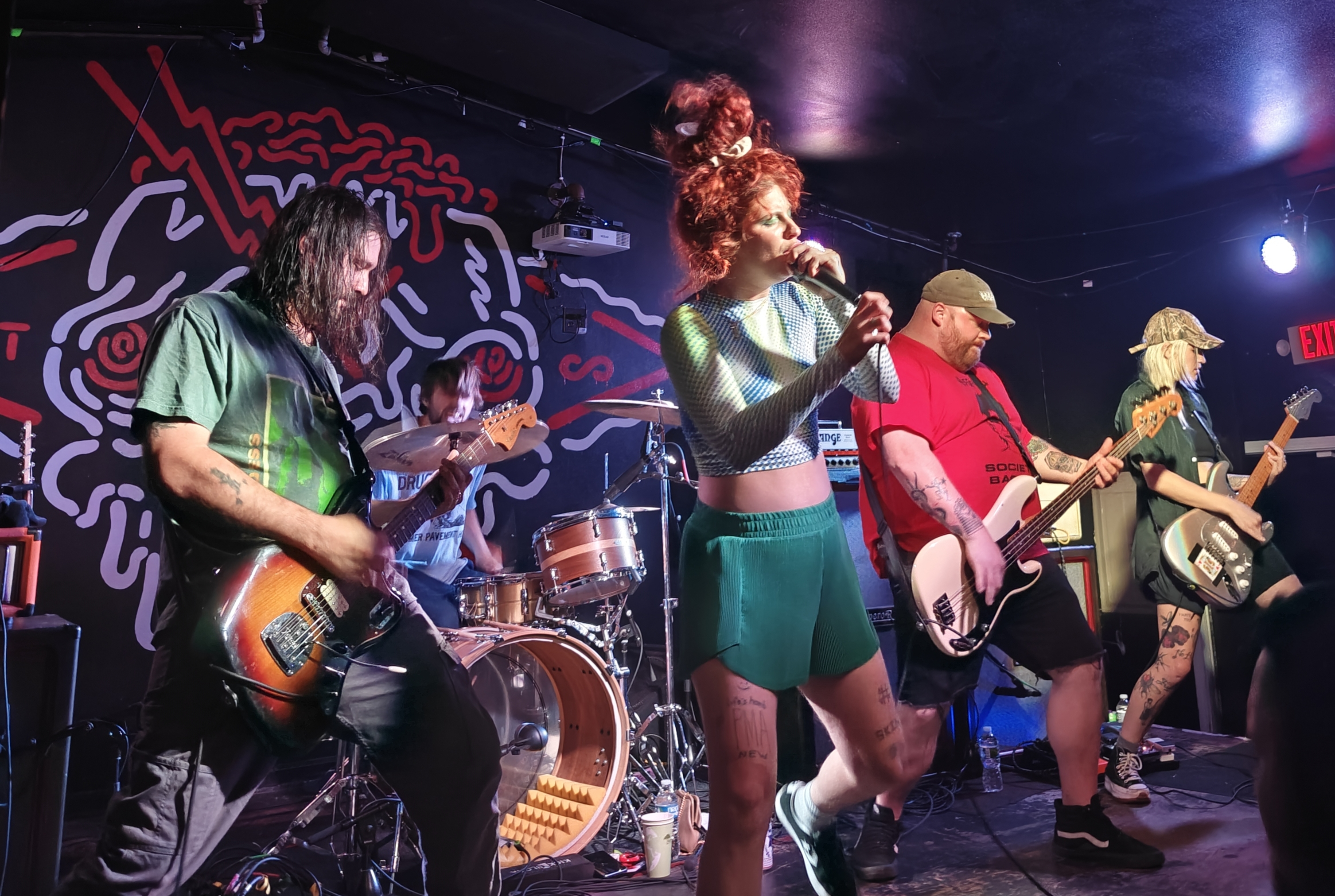
- Gel performing in 2024

Background information
- Origin: Hightstown and Forked River, New Jersey, U.S.
- Genres: Hardcore punk
- Years active: 2018–2025
- Labels: Convulse; Atomic Action; Crew Cuts; Blue Grape Music
- Spinoff of: Sick Shit
- Past members: Sami Kaiser; Matthew Bobko; Anthony Webster; Zach Miller; Maddi Nave; Alex Salter

Gel was an American hardcore punk band from New Jersey. Formed in 2018 as a side project of powerviolence band Sick Shit, Gel has released one full-length album, two EPs, one demo, and one split mini album. Huw Baines of NME credited them for "shaping the sound of hardcore in 2023".

In March 2025, the band announced their dissolution by an Instagram post, citing internal conflicts with former guitarist Anthony Webster. The band accused Webster of misusing band funds and engaging in misconduct towards the band members.

== History ==
Gel originated in Hightstown and Forked River, New Jersey, from the former New Jersey powerviolence band Sick Shit, which was founded by guitarist Matthew Bobko and drummer Zach Miller. Sami Kaiser joined soon after. When Sick Shit's bassist departed from the group, the role was filled by Anthony Webster, who soon after switched to guitar. This lineup of Sick Shit formed Gel in 2018 as a side project in order to pursue a more traditional hardcore punk style. Gel released their debut self-titled EP in 2019. That same year, the band released a tape called HC For The Freaks. The band released their second EP in 2021 titled Violent Closure. Gel also released a standalone single in 2021 called "Mental Static". In 2022, Gel released a split, Shock Therapy, with the band Cold Brats. The band's debut album, Only Constant, was released on March 31, 2023. The album received positive reviews.

On August 16, 2024, Gel released a 5-song EP titled Persona on new record label Blue Grape Music. The EP's themes were inspired by the works of Carl Jung, particularly his concept of the shadow self. Persona has been well-received by critics, with praise for its sonic evolution that incorporates a bolder production style while maintaining the band's aggressive hardcore sound.

On March 19, 2025, Gel announced the dissolution of the band through an Instagram post, citing former guitarist Anthony Webster's "heinous acts in trying to forward himself in his musical career" as having caused "irreparable damage to the band". Webster was accused of stealing the band's funds to pay for personal expenses, such as rent, food orders, and an "unbelievable number of OnlyFans purchases", leaking nudes of other band members on Reddit, and acting violent towards the rest of the band.

== Musical style ==
Gel played a style of traditional, fast hardcore punk. Their music sometimes makes use of elements of post-punk and D-beat. Unlike the predominant style in hardcore during the 2010s and 2020s, Gel's music leans heavily on the genre's punk rock roots. Revolver magazine called their "fast, noisy and uncompromisingly energetic" style as "filling the void that's been empty in the broader hardcore landscape since the early days of Trash Talk".

== Members ==
Final lineup

- Sami Kaiser – vocals (2018–2025)
- Matthew Bobko – bass (2018–2025)
- Madison Nave – guitar (2021–2025)
- Alex Salter - drums (2023–2025)

Former members

- Anthony Webster – guitar (2018–2024)
- Zach Miller – drums (2018–2023)

== Discography ==
Albums

- Only Constant (2023)

EPs

- Gel (2018)
- Violent Closure (2021)
- Persona(2024)

Splits

- Shock Therapy (with Cold Brats; 2022)

Demos

- Demo 2018 (2018)
