= White Reaper =

American garage punk band from Kentucky

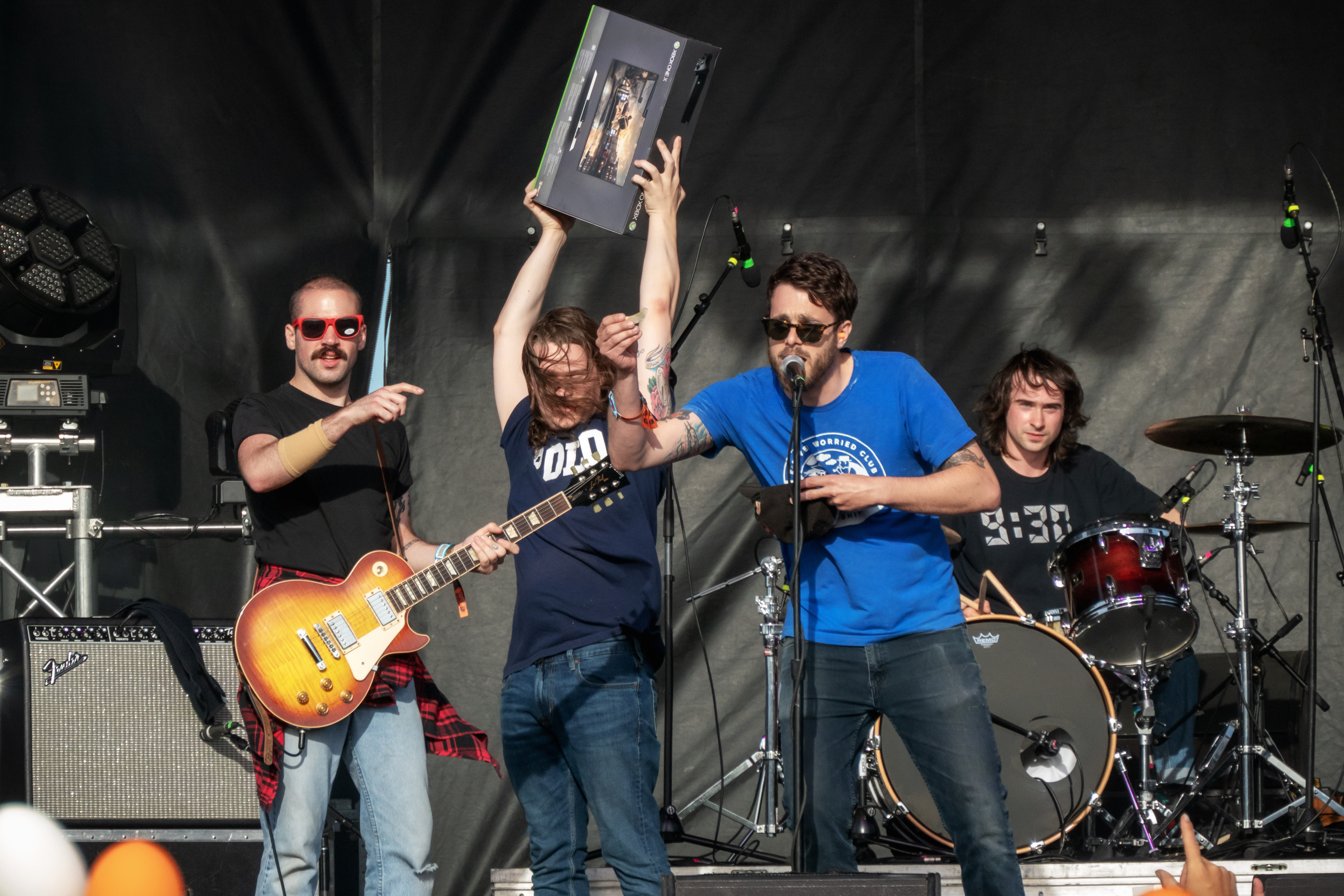
- White Reaper in May 2018

Background information
- Origin: Louisville, Kentucky, U.S.
- Genres: Hard rock, garage rock, garage punk, power pop, glam rock
- Years active: 2012–2026
- Labels: Blue Grape Music, Elektra, Polyvinyl
- Members: Tony Esposito; Ryan Hater; Hunter Thompson
- Past members: Nick Wilkerson; Sam Wilkerson
- Website: whitereaperusa.com

White Reaper was an American garage punk band based in Louisville, Kentucky. The band includes Tony Esposito (guitar/vocals), Ryan Hater and Hunter Thompson. The band has released two EPs and five full-length albums, their first album in 2015 White Reaper Does It Again, and The World's Best American Band in 2017. White Reaper released their third studio album You Deserve Love on October 18, 2019, their major label debut. Their fourth studio album, Asking for a Ride, was released on January 27, 2023.

== History ==
=== Early years (2012–2014) ===
White Reaper was formed by Tony Esposito and Nick Wilkerson while they were in high school. When they were 17 years old, they saw an entirely white Grim Reaper prop in a Halloween Express, becoming known as White Reaper thereafter. The duo then recorded two demos, DEMO 2012 and WHITE AURA in 2012. A 7-inch featuring the songs "The Cut" and "Conspirator" was released in 2013 on Earthbound Records. Wilkerson's twin brother Sam Wilkerson then joined the band as the bassist. Elementary school friend of Esposito and keyboardist Ryan Hater would also join the band.

=== Polyvinyl Records (2014–2018) ===
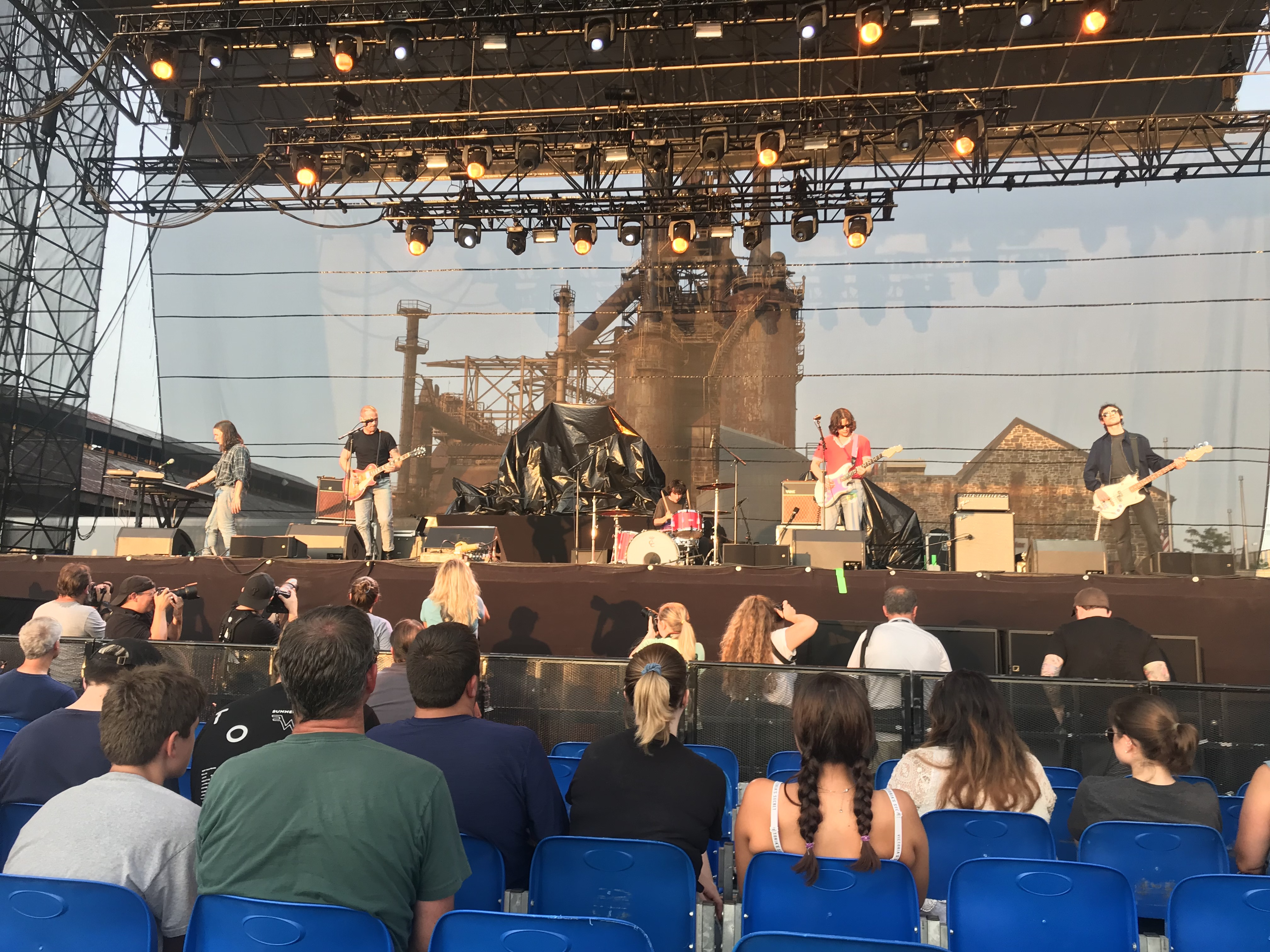
White Reaper playing Musikfest in Bethlehem, Pennsylvania in August 2019

After signing to Polyvinyl Records in early 2014, their label debut EP White Reaper was released. The band followed it with a tour with Young Widows. In 2015, White Reaper's first studio album White Reaper Does It Again was released on Polyvinyl Records and they opened for bands such as Twin Peaks and Together Pangea. Guitarist Hunter Thompson joined the band in 2016. Their second album The World's Best American Band was released in 2017. In 2018, White Reaper played at South by Southwest and toured as an opening act for Weezer and Billy Idol.

=== Elektra years (2019–2024) ===
In 2019, White Reaper would sign with Elektra Records. Three singles were released from their upcoming albums in Summer of 2019. The song "Might Be Right" became the band's highest-charting single, peaking at number six on the US Hot Rock Songs chart and atop the US Alternative Songs chart. White Reaper would play at the music festival Riot Fest and with The Killers. In October 2019, You Deserve Love was released, their major label debut. White Reaper appeared on Jimmy Kimmel Live! in December 2019, playing "Might Be Right" and "Real Long Time". White Reaper contributed a cover of the Metallica song "Sad But True" to the charity tribute album The Metallica Blacklist, released in September 2021.

White Reaper released their fourth studio album, Asking for a Ride, January 27, 2023 on Elektra Records. Later that year, a song from the album, "Getting Into Trouble w/ The Boss", was featured in an ad for Taco Bell's $5 Cravings Box, titled 'Family Reunion'. In mid-2023, they opened several shows for Weezer during their Indie Rock Road Trip tour.

In June 2024, Nick Wilkerson and Sam Wilkerson announced on Instagram their departure from the band.

=== Blue Grape Music (2025–present) ===
On June 25, 2025, the remaining members of the band released a new single "Honestly" and announced the upcoming release of their fifth studio album Only Slightly Empty, released on Blue Grape Music on September 26, 2025.

After re-releasing the latter album as Only Slightly Expanded with 3 additional songs and performing a co-headlining tour with Drug Church, the band performed their final show on May 16, 2026, at the Mercury Ballroom in Louisville, Kentucky.

== Band members ==
Former

- Tony Esposito – guitar, vocals (2012–2026)
- Ryan Hater – keyboard (2012–2026)
- Hunter Thompson – guitar, vocals (2016–2026)
- Nick Wilkerson – drums, percussion (2012–2024)
- Sam Wilkerson – bass (2012–2024)

== Discography ==
=== Studio albums ===
Title	Details	Peak chart positions	
Title	Details	US Heat	US Indie
White Reaper Does It Again	Released: July 17, 2015; Label: Polyvinyl; Formats: CD, digital download, LP, cassette	—	—
The World's Best American Band	Released: April 7, 2017; Label: Polyvinyl; Formats: CD, digital download, LP, cassette	7	34
You Deserve Love	Released: October 18, 2019; Label: Elektra; Formats: CD, digital download, LP	11	—
Asking for a Ride	Released: January 27, 2023; Label: Elektra; Formats: CD, digital download, LP, cassette	—	—
Only Slightly Empty	Released: September 26, 2025; Label: Blue Grape Music; Formats: digital download, LP	—	—
"—" denotes album that did not chart or was not released

=== EPs ===
Title	Details
Demo 2012	Released: September 17, 2012; Label: Self-released; Formats: digital download
White Aura	Released: October 31, 2012; Label: Self-released; Formats: CD-r, digital download
White Reaper	Released: June 24, 2014; Label: Polyvinyl; Formats: CD, digital download, LP, cassette

=== Singles ===
List of singles, with selected chart positions, showing year released and album name
Title	Year	Peak chart positions					Album
Title	Year	US AAA	US Alt.	US Main.	US Rock	CAN Rock	Album
"Make Me Wanna Die"	2015	—	—	—	—	—	White Reaper Does It Again
“I Don’t Think She Cares”	2015	—	—	—	—	—	White Reaper Does It Again
“Pills”	2015	—	—	—	—	—	White Reaper Does It Again
“Last 4th of July”	2015	—	—	—	—	—	White Reaper Does It Again
"Judy French"	2017	—	—	—	—	—	The World's Best American Band
"The World's Best American Band"	2017	—	—	—	—	—	The World's Best American Band
"The Stack"	2017	—	—	—	—	—	The World's Best American Band
"Might Be Right"	2019	4	1	39	6	6	You Deserve Love
"Real Long Time"	2019	19	19	—	— (Note: "Real Long Time" did not enter the Rock Songs chart, but peaked at number 30 on the Rock & Alternative Airplay chart.)	27	You Deserve Love
"1F"	2019	—	—	—	—	—	You Deserve Love
"Pages"	2022	1	4	—	— (Note: "Pages" did not enter the Rock Songs chart, but peaked at number six on the Rock & Alternative Airplay chart.)	3	Asking for a Ride
"Fog Machine"	2023	—	—	33	—	—	Asking for a Ride
"Shimmy" (feat. Spiritual Cramp)	2024	—	—	—	—	—	Non-album single
"Honestly"	2025	—	—	—	—	31	Only Slightly Empty
"—" denotes a recording that did not chart or was not released in that territory.
