= The World's Best American Band =

Studio album by White Reaper
- Released: April 7, 2017
- Genre: Blues rock, garage rock, power pop
- Length: 31:49
- Label: Polyvinyl

White Reaper chronology
White Reaper Does It Again (2015)	The World's Best American Band (2017)	You Deserve Love (2019)

Singles from The World's Best American Band
- 1. "Judy French" Released: January 26, 2017; 2. "The World's Best American Band" Released: February 27, 2017; 3. "The Stack" Released: March 23, 2017

Professional ratings
Aggregate scores
Source	Rating
Metacritic	81/100
Review scores
Source	Rating
The 405	8.5/10
The A.V. Club	B+
Pitchfork	8.0/10

The World's Best American Band is the second studio album by American band White Reaper from Kentucky. The album was released through Polyvinyl on April 7, 2017.

== Release and promotion ==
Three songs were released as singles in promotion of the album.

=== Singles ===
White Reaper announced their first single, "Judy French," through Stereogum on January 26, 2017, about a month and a half prior to the release of the album. Critics immediately noticed a more power pop-infused sound classic rock tone to the band's sound from their previous garage and lo-fi sound that dominated their previous works. Ben Kaye of Consequence of Sound, described the single as a "frills-free slice of power pop, strutting not only with confidence but unbridled glee."

Approximately a month later, the band released their second single, the title track, on February 27, 2017, through Stereogum. Stereogum beat writer James Rettig described the second single as "an energetic and dense rocker that serves as a good follow-up to lead single 'Judy French'".

In March 2017, the band released their third single, "The Stack". Pranav Trewn of Stereogum described the third track as "another fireball of Southern swagger and jingly garage-rock momentum."

== Track listing ==
No.	Title	Length
1.	"The World's Best American Band"	4:46
2.	"Judy French"	3:25
3.	"Eagle Beach"	3:40
4.	"Little Silver Cross"	4:11
5.	"The Stack"	2:45
6.	"Party Next Door"	2:15
7.	"Crystal Pistol"	2:22
8.	"Tell Me"	3:41
9.	"Daisies"	2:53
10.	"Another Day"	1:51

== Charts ==
Chart (2017)	Peak position
US Heatseekers Albums (Billboard)	7
US Independent Albums (Billboard)	34
US Vinyl Albums (Billboard)	17
