= White Reaper Does It Again =

Studio album by White Reaper
- Released: July 17, 2015
- Genres: Punk rock, garage rock, indie rock
- Length: 33:26
- Label: Polyvinyl Record Co.

White Reaper chronology
| White Reaper (2014) | White Reaper Does It Again (2015) | The World's Best American Band (2017) |

Professional ratings
Aggregate scores
| Source | Rating |
|---|---|
| Metacritic | 76/100 |
Review scores
| Source | Rating |
| AllMusic | 4/5 stars |
| The A.V. Club | B |
| Consequence of Sound | B+ |
| Exclaim | 7/10 |
| NME | 8/10 |
| Now | 3/5 Ns |
| Paste | 8.8/10 |
| Pitchfork | 6.8/10 |
| PopMatters | 6/10 stars |

White Reaper Does It Again is the debut studio album by the band White Reaper.

== Track listing ==
| No. | Title | Length |
|---|---|---|
| 1. | "Make Me Wanna Die" | 2:33 |
| 2. | "I Don't Think She Cares" | 2:00 |
| 3. | "Pills" | 3:25 |
| 4. | "On Your Mind" | 3:36 |
| 5. | "Last 4th of July" | 1:21 |
| 6. | "Alone Tonight" | 2:43 |
| 7. | "Candy" | 2:38 |
| 8. | "Sheila" | 3:33 |
| 9. | "Friday the 13th" | 2:19 |
| 10. | "Wolf Trap Hotel" | 3:20 |
| 11. | "Don't You Think I Know?" | 2:59 |
| 12. | "B.T.K." | 2:59 |
