= Ruined (EP) =

EP by Ceremony
- Released: 20 December 2005
- Genre: Hardcore punk, powerviolence
- Length: 7:17
- Label: Malfunction Records

Ceremony chronology
Ruined (2005)	Violence Violence (2006)

Ruined is a 2005 EP by San Francisco Bay Area hardcore punk band Ceremony. Released as 7" vinyl by Malfunction Records, Ruined is Ceremony's debut studio release. The seven songs in the EP are also included as bonus tracks in the CD version of 2006's Violence Violence.

== Track listing ==
All tracks are written by Ceremony.

No.	Title	Length
1.	"Kersed"	1:11
2.	"It's Going To Be A Cold Winter"	0:15
3.	"This Is My War"	0:43
4.	"You're All The Same"	0:42
5.	"Troubled Waters"	0:34
6.	"Throwing Bricks"	1:59
7.	"I Want To Put This To An End"	1:53
Total length:		7:17
