= Spiritual Cramp (album) =

Studio album by Spiritual Cramp
- Released: November 3, 2023
- Studio: Different Fur Studios, San Francisco, California, US
- Genre: Punk rock
- Length: 26:01
- Language: English
- Label: Blue Grape Music
- Producer: Michael Bingham; Michael Fenton

Spiritual Cramp chronology
Here Comes More Bad News (2021)	Spiritual Cramp (2023)	Rude (2025)

Spiritual Cramp is the debut studio album by American punk rock band Spiritual Cramp. The album was released on November 3, 2023 through Blue Grape Music.

== Background ==
The self-titled album was written and produced by band members Michael Bingham and Michael Fenton, with additional production and mixing from Carlos de la Garza. It was announced on August 23, 2023, alongside the release of "Talkin' on the Internet", a "driving and spiky old-school punk song" about instant regret. The band will embark on a UK and Ireland tour with Militarie Gun in December 2023.

Having tried to keep themselves "small" for several years, the album marks the transition to "a more refined and hi-fi version" of the band. They wrote about 50 songs for their debut and narrowed it down to 22, later selecting only ten of them. Producer De la Garza helped them "trim the fat off this record", while they made sure to stick with a "really high production value". Lead singer Bingham spent around "40 hours recording vocals", having to face his own problems with "over-analysis and self-consciousness" and eventually got stuck in his head. Then the rest of the band chimed in, making him realize that one person is "not the be all and end all" of the way things should look or sound.

== Critical reception ==
Professional ratings
Aggregate scores
Source	Rating
Metacritic	76/100
Review scores
Source	Rating
Far Out	4/5 stars
Pitchfork	7.0/10
The Line of Best Fit	8/10

Tom Breihan at Stereogum awarded Spiritual Cramp the accolade "album of the week", noting that there is "nothing mannered or overthought" on the record, but described it as "ferocious, instinctive rock 'n' roll". The "angst and anger" processed on it felt like "euphoria" and "music to feel" to Breihan. Poppy Burton of Far Out applauded the band for "cherry-picking from wide-ranging inspirations", including "post-punk, hardcore, and indie", and forging out their own unique sound with an accessible "grit of punk". Burton referred to the album as "eminently cool" with a mixture of "anthemic beats" and "universal anxieties". Reviewing the album for Pitchfork, Emma Madden wrote that what the album "might lack in blood, it makes up for with zippy efficiency. The band pulls the focus away from its propensity for carnage and toward their instinctive sense of melody, trading disorder for a methodicalness that galvanizes rather than placates", concluding that it "inspires the same kind of fist-pumping and pogo-ing as the band's unhinged live shows". Hayden Merrick of Paste characterized this album as "polished, fun and obsessed with conflict", giving it a 7.0 out of 10 for building on the band's previous sound with stronger production.

== Track listing ==
All tracks are written by Michael Bingham and Mike Fenton.

Spiritual Cramp track listing
No.	Title	Length
1.	"Blowback"	2:47
2.	"Slick Rick"	2:55
3.	"Talkin' on the Internet"	2:35
4.	"Herberts on Holiday"	2:24
5.	"City on Fire"	2:44
6.	"Better Off This Way"	2:11
7.	"Clashing at the Party"	2:37
8.	"Catch a Hot One"	3:09
9.	"Can I Borrow Your Lighter?"	2:33
10.	"Addict"	2:02
Total length:		25:57

== Personnel ==
Spiritual Cramp

- Mike "The Mayor" Bingham – production
- Jacob "Juice" Breeze
- Mike "The Boss" Fenton – production
- José "Directa" Luna
- "Big" Nate Punty
- Julian "T1000" Smith
- Sometimes Max

Additional personnel

- Grace Coleman – recording, additional production
- Dave Collins – mastering at GZ Media
- Carlos de la Garza – additional production, mixing at Music Friends
- Alex Mossa – front cover and insert photography
- Dave Rath – additional production
- True Colors Creative Group – design
- Max Wickham – back cover photography

== See also ==
- 2023 in American music
- List of 2023 albums
