= Try Me (Self Defense Family album) =

Studio album by Self Defense Family
- Released: January 7, 2014
- Genre: Post-hardcore; post-punk
- Length: 80:01
- Label: Deathwish (DW153)

Self Defense Family chronology
Least Violent Time in Human History (2013)	Try Me (2014)	Heaven is Earth (2015)

Try Me is the fourth studio album by the American rock band Self Defense Family and first under this moniker — previous studio albums were released under the name End of a Year. The album was released on January 7, 2014, through Deathwish Inc. In November 2013, the band released a lyric video for the track "Turn the Fan On." The album was available on the digital music streaming service Spotify over a month before its official release date.

== Background ==
Try Me features an approximately 40-minute-long interview with the 1980s pornographic actress Angelique Bernstein (known by industry name, Jeanna Fine), split between two tracks titled "Angelique, Pt. 1" and "Angelique, Pt. 2". The interview was conducted by Self Defense Family vocalist Patrick Kindlon and guitarist Andrew Duggan in a motel in New York City, and the original recording is over three hours long. The portion of the interview that appears on Try Me tells Bernstein's early life, including as Lukas Hodge of Noisey puts it, her "fatherless, bullied, sexually confused childhood, to living on couches and in doorways, to an abusive relationship, told in disturbing detail, in which she essentially becomes a prisoner," but ends before she can get into her porn career. About the interview Kindlon said, "She's just an interesting person. She has an amazing personal history and you don't need an interest in pornography to find her story compelling. You just need an interest in human beings."

== Critical reception ==
Professional ratings
Aggregate scores
Source	Rating
Metacritic	81/100
Review scores
Source	Rating
AbsolutePunk	9.5/10
Alternative Press	4/5 stars
Pitchfork	7.2/10
PopMatters	7/10 stars

Upon its release, Try Me received generally positive reviews from music critics. At Metacritic, which assigns a normalized rating out of 100 to reviews from critics, the album received an average score of 81, which indicates "universal acclaim", based on 4 reviews. At Alternative Press, Brian Shultz rated the album four stars out of five, and stated that "the entire thing is a cathartic art project that feels like the moment of forced calm after an exhausting sob." AbsolutePunk staff critic Drew Beringer described Try Me as "one of the most unique, reflective, darkly humorous, and brilliant records to grace ears in a while." Pitchfork's Jason Heller stated: "Although most tracks on Try Me are taut and concise, they’re built around churning, sprawling riffs that feel far larger than the songs that contain them." Chris Conaton of PopMatters wrote: "Try Me is an album that does things completely on its own rather difficult terms and succeeds on those terms."

== Track listing ==
No.	Title	Length
1.	"Tithe Pig"	2:56
2.	"Nail House Music"	4:04
3.	"Turn the Fan On"	4:15
4.	"Mistress Appears at a Funeral"	3:01
5.	"Apport Birds"	6:05
6.	"Angelique, Pt. 1"	21:02
7.	"Aletta"	5:23
8.	"Fear of Poverty in Old Age"	3:06
9.	"Weird Fingering"	2:25
10.	"Dingo Fence"	10:10
11.	"Angelique, Pt. 2"	17:34
