= Rude (album) =

Studio album by Spiritual Cramp
- Released: October 23, 2025
- Genre: Punk rock; post-punk; pop-punk; ska
- Length: 31:40
- Language: English
- Label: Blue Grape Music
- Producer: John Congleton

Spiritual Cramp chronology
Spiritual Cramp (2023)	Rude (2025)

Singles from Rude
- 1. "At My Funeral" Released: July 17, 2025; 2. "Automatic" Released: September 18, 2025; 3. "You've Got My Number" Released: October 24, 2025

Rude (stylized in all upper case) is the second studio album by American punk rock band Spiritual Cramp. The album was released on October 23, 2025, through Blue Grape Music.

== Background and recording ==
Following the release of their 2023 self-titled debut album, which was co-produced internally by vocalist Michael Bingham and bassist Michael Fenton, Spiritual Cramp approached their second album recording with a more collaborative process. Bingham stated in interviews that the band generated a large volume of material during pre-production, assembling dozens of demos which were then shared among all the band members for further development and refinement. Rather than relying primarily on Bingham's direction, as in earlier releases, the band collectively workshopped songs, with individual members contributing new arrangements, guitar parts, and sampled elements. As a result, the album lyrics focused on personal insecurities and the facade of appearing cool, rather than just being onself.

The album marked a significant shift in production approach, as Rude was the band's first project to involve an external producer. It was produced by John Congleton, known for his work with artists such as St. Vincent and Sharon Van Etten. Bingham described the experience as an adjustment from the band's previous self-produced workflow, noting that working with an outside producer required him to relinquish some creative control and "trust" external guidance in the studio.

== Critical reception ==
Professional ratings
Review scores
Source	Rating
Clash	8/10
God Is in the TV	2/5 stars
Kerrang!	4/5 stars
New Noise	4/5 stars
Paste	7.6/10

Jack Wilkie, writing for Clash magazine called the album as a "blend of punk, pop-punk, even ska, with a healthy pinch of grunge and indie thrown in for good measure – and this album perfectly portrays all those genres." He further said the album is "Wall-to-wall entertainment, ‘RUDE’ is an excellent point of introduction to Spiritual Cramp – you can’t help but become addicted."

== Track listing ==
All tracks are written by Spiritual Cramp.

Rude track listing
No.	Title	Length
1.	"I'm An Anarchist"	1:34
2.	"Go Back Home"	2:15
3.	"At My Funeral"	2:32
4.	"Automatic"	2:31
5.	"You've Got My Number" (featuring Sharon Van Etten)	3:50
6.	"I Hate the Way I Look"	2:03
7.	"Interlude"	0:21
8.	"Violence in the Supermarket"	2:24
9.	"True Love (Is Hard to Find)"	2:25
10.	"Crazy"	2:28
11.	"Young Offenders"	2:43
12.	"New Religion"	3:29
13.	"People Don't Change"	3:05
Total length:		31:40

== Personnel ==
Album credits extracted form Discogs.

Spiritual Cramp

- David Bingham – vocals
- Dave Collins — horn
- Mike Fenton – bass
- Orville Neely III – guitar
- Achilles Poloynis – guitar
- Nate Punty – drums
- Julian Smith — tambourine

Additional musicians

- Sharon Van Etten — vocals (Track 5)
- Jaake Margo – vocals (not specified)

Production and artwork

- David Bingham — engineer
- John Congleton – producer, engineer
- Sarah Davis — mixing
- Carlos De La Garza — mixing
- Mike Fenton — engineer
- Jack Florio — mastering
- José Luna — artwork
- Jack Mullin — mixing
- Julian Smith — artwork, programming

== Charts ==
Chart performance for Rude
Chart (2025)	Peak position
US Independent Albums (Billboard)	28
