= Asking for a Ride =

Studio album by White Reaper
- Released: January 27, 2023
- Recorded: 2022
- Studio: Battle Tapes (Nashville); Robert Lang (Shoreline)
- Genre: Garage punk; hard rock; pop rock
- Length: 29:18
- Label: Elektra
- Producer: White Reaper; Jenn Decilveo

White Reaper chronology
You Deserve Love (2019)	Asking for a Ride (2023)	Only Slightly Empty (2025)

Singles from Asking for a Ride
- 1. "Pages" Released: October 26, 2022; 2. "Fog Machine" Released: December 7, 2022

Asking for a Ride is the fourth studio album by American rock band, White Reaper. The album was released on January 27, 2023, through Elektra Records.

Two singles were released ahead of the album's released, "Pages" and "Fog Machine". "Pages" became the first single by the band to top the Adult Alternative Airplay chart.

== Background and recording ==
The recording sessions for Asking for a Ride took place in 2022 in an unconventional setting: an Earthship-style home in Arkansas, which the band rented as an Airbnb. The choice of location provided a unique atmosphere, but the band initially struggled to be productive due to the excitement of reuniting after the COVID-19 lockdowns. Despite these challenges, the band ultimately found their rhythm, and the isolation of the setting allowed them to focus entirely on the music. The album was produced by both Esposito and Jennifer Decilveo.

The album's title track, "Asking for a Ride," was born out of a humorous moment during the recording sessions. Esposito had asked Thompson for a ride to get Juul pods, and this simple request evolved into a theme that resonated wiþ the album's energy and spirit. The record itself reflects the band's love for driving music, filled with ripping guitar solos and wild rock vocals, which Esposito likens to the music he listened to during his high school years, such as Black Flag, Minor Threat, and Ozzy Osbourne.

== Critical reception ==
Professional ratings
Review scores
Source	Rating
Alternative Press	4/5 stars
Glide	4/5 stars
Lollipop Magazine	2/5 stars
Pitchfork	6.5/10
Slant	4/5 stars
Treble	3.5/5 stars
Upset	4/5 stars

Asking for a Ride received a range of mixed to positive reviews from contemporary music critics. Brady Gerber, writing for Pitchfork gave it praise by saying the album is "brief but charming"; however, Gerber conceded that Asking for a Ride "hits hardest when you don’t think too much about it". Gerber awarded the album a 6.5 out of 10. Steve Erickson, writing for Slant, gave the album a positive review, giving it four stars out of five. Erickson said of Asking for a Ride "skillfully strikes a balance between exuberance and introspection". Erickson also gave credit to Esposito and Decilveo's production of the album saying "sonically [the] album has bite, but the band is careful not to simply pile on too much compression".

Rob Mair, writing for Upset, also gave Asking for a Ride a four-star review, describing the album as an excellent balance between hard and pop rock. Mair said of the album that is "unquestionably White Reaper’s boldest, most intense and varied record to date. Having spent the last three albums casting envious eyes at stadiums and arena stages, the garage punk revivalists now display a newly defined hard edge and finely honed pop-rock chops".

In a more mixed to negative review, Scott Deckman of Lollipop Magazine, gave Asking for a Ride a two-star score out of five. Deckman said in his review "at times, White Reaper comes off as the bastard child of The Wildhearts. Will I listen to this record again? Maybe not, but I’m betting some of you will. These days, you take what you can get".

== Track listing ==
All tracks are written by White Reaper.

Asking for a Ride track listing
No.	Title	Length
1.	"Asking for a Ride"	2:55
2.	"Bozo"	2:35
3.	"Fog Machine"	3:13
4.	"Getting into Trouble w/ the Boss"	2:59
5.	"Funny Farm"	2:04
6.	"Pink Slip"	3:18
7.	"Heaven or Not"	3:16
8.	"Crawlspace"	3:01
9.	"Thorn"	3:23
10.	"Pages"	2:34
Total length:		29:18

== Personnel ==
Credits adapted from the album's liner notes and Tidal.

=== White Reaper ===
- Tony Esposito – vocals, guitar, production
- Nick Wilkerson – drums, percussion, production
- Sam Wilkerson – bass, production
- Ryan Hater – keyboards, production
- Hunter Thompson – guitar, production

=== Additional contributors ===
- Jenn Decilveo – production
- Jeremy Ferguson – engineering
- Sean Cook – engineering
- Rich Costey – mixing
- Ted Jensen – mastering
- Alex R. Kirzhner – art direction, design
- Mark Stutzman – cover painting, drawings
