= Spiritual Cramp =

American rock band

- Origin: San Francisco, California, United States
- Genres: Hardcore punk; post-punk; punk rock; garage rock
- Years active: 2017–present
- Label: Blue Grape Music
- Spinoff of: Creative Adult
- Members: Michael Bingham; Mike Fenton; Nate Punty; Julian Smith; José Luna; Orville Neeley
- Past members: Stewart Kuhlo; Max Wickham; Blaine Patrick; Jacob Breeze
- Website: spiritualcramp.com

Spiritual Cramp is an American punk rock band formed in San Francisco, California in 2017. The band's musical style incorporates elements of various genres, including new wave, classic punk, reggae, and 1990s alternative rock. The band features Michael Bingham on vocals, Mike Fenton on bass, Jacob Breeze on lead guitar, Nate Punty on rhythm guitar, Julian Smith on drums and José Luna on keyboards.

== History ==
Spiritual Cramp formed in late 2016 into 2017 when Michael Bingham and Mike Fenton began working on music together after leaving their previous band, Creative Adult. The band's name was inspired by a song by Christian Death. They have been considered part of the California Coast hardcore scene with other bands such as Drain, Militarie Gun, Scowl, and Zulu.

In 2017, the band released their first extended play, Mass Hysteria, which caught the attention of Blue Grape Music, which they subsequently signed with. Under this label, they released their self-titled debut album, which was co-produced by vocalist Michael Bingham and bassist Michael Fenton, with additional production by Carlos de la Garza (known for his work with Paramore and M83).

In November 2023, their self-titled debut album was released. Their sophomore LP, Rude, was announced in July 2025, later released on October 24th of that same year.

== Discography ==
=== Studio albums ===
- Spiritual Cramp (2023)
- Rude (2025)

=== EPs ===
- Mass Hysteria (2017)
- Police State (2018)
- Television (2018)
- Here Comes More Bad News (2021)

=== Singles ===
- "Nah, That Ain't It" / "Phone Lines Down" (2023)
- "Whatever You Say, Man" (feat. White Reaper) (2024)
