= The L-Shaped Man =

Studio album by Ceremony
- Released: May 19, 2015
- Genre: Post-punk
- Length: 36:13
- Label: Matador
- Producer: John Reis

Ceremony chronology
Zoo (2012)	The L-Shaped Man (2015)	In the Spirit World Now (2019)

The L-Shaped Man is the fifth album by American punk rock band Ceremony. Produced by Drive Like Jehu guitarist John Reis, the album was released on May 19, 2015 through Matador Records. It marks as a further shift to a Joy Division-influenced post-punk sound that was introduced on band's preceding album, Zoo (2012). Lyrically, the album deals with vocalist Ross Farrar's recent break-up.

A music video featuring tracks "The Separation" and "The Understanding" was released on March 26, 2015.

== Critical reception ==
Professional ratings
Aggregate scores
Source	Rating
Metacritic	65/100
Review scores
Source	Rating
AllMusic	4/5 stars
The A.V. Club	B−
Consequence of Sound	B
DIY	4/5 stars
Now	2/5 stars
Paste	9.3/10
Pitchfork	3.3/10
Rolling Stone	2/5 stars

Upon its release, The L-Shaped Man received mixed-to-positive reviews from music critics. At Metacritic, which assigns a normalized rating out of 100 to reviews from critics, the album received an average score of 65, which indicates "generally favorable reviews", based on 9 reviews. David Anthony of The A.V. Club stated that the album is "more like the best album Ian Curtis [of Joy Division] never made." AllMusic critic Timothy Monger wrote: "Whether or not they're borrowing too heavily from the Ian Curtis handbook, Ceremony have a strong handle on this style, and after nearly a decade together, these new clothes fit them quite well." Ryan Brady of Consequence of Sound described the album as "such an emotionally naked record that its bleakness is oddly invigorating."

Tom Walters of DIY was positive in his assessment of the album, stating: "They might not have returned to their hardcore roots, but Ceremony have veered off into an abyss of misery of despair again, and they’re back on track because of it." Robert Ham of Paste also praised the album, calling it "one of the boldest moves this California quintet has ever taken." Nevertheless, Now critic John Semley thought that the album "feels like a boring exercise: a band performing post-punk idolatry instead of bothering to try anything new." Rolling Stone critic Kory Grow thought that the album "is stifled by too much restraint," while Ian Cohen of Pitchfork panned the album, writing: "Maybe it's good for a laugh, but only as a defense mechanism against the cringe-inducing experience of watching artistic expression abandon a heartbroken man at his lowest moment."

== Track listing ==
All tracks written by Ceremony.

No.	Title	Length
1.	"Hibernation"	1:33
2.	"Exit Fears"	3:19
3.	"Bleeder"	4:36
4.	"Your Life in France"	3:15
5.	"Your Life in America"	3:48
6.	"The Separation"	3:31
7.	"The Pattern"	2:29
8.	"Root of the World"	3:06
9.	"The Party"	3:25
10.	"The Bridge"	3:27
11.	"The Understanding"	3:44

=== Bonus tracks ===
No.	Title	Length
12.	"Vivication"	3:38
13.	"The Hide (Pre-Order Only)"	2:28

== Personnel ==
Album personnel as adapted from Allmusic.

Ceremony

- Ross Farrar — vocals, artwork
- Anthony Anzaldo — guitar
- Andy Nelson — guitar
- Justin Davis — bass
- Jake Casarotti — drums

Other personnel

- Ceremony — art direction, layout
- John Reis — production
- Dean Reis — assistant

== Chart positions ==
Chart (2015)	Peak position
US Billboard Hard Rock Albums	20
US Billboard Heatseekers	11
