= Rohnert Park (album) =

Studio album by Ceremony
- Released: 8 June 2010
- Recorded: December 2009 – February 2010, Polymorph Recording, Oakland, California
- Genre: Hardcore punk; post-hardcore
- Length: 35:22
- Label: Bridge 9
- Producer: Dan Rathbun

Ceremony chronology
| Still Nothing Moves You (2008) | Rohnert Park (2010) | Zoo (2012) |

Singles from Rohnert Park
- 1. "Sick/Life As A War" Released: 2010

Rohnert Park is the third studio album by San Francisco Bay Area hardcore punk band Ceremony. Named after the band's hometown of Rohnert Park, California, the 13-track LP is their first full-length release after a series of high-profile tours, including their March 2009 tour with Converge and January 2010 tour with A.F.I. It was released on June 8, 2010, through Bridge 9 Records and was their last release for the label.

== Critical reception ==
Professional ratings
Review scores
| Source | Rating |
|---|---|
| Metroactive | favourable |
| Punknews.org | 4.5/5 stars |
| Redefine Magazine | favourable |
| Sputnikmusic | 4/5 stars |

The album generally received positive reviews from critics. Metroactive critic Gabe Meline wrote: "Whereas most hardcore bands push to extremes of speed, spectacle and spazz, Ceremony deal in the rare commodity of restraint and show that the original genius of punk rock—letting urgency and purpose carry technically unvarnished music—is alive and well." John Gentile of Punknews.org stated: "Throughout Rohnert Park, Ceremony keeps throwing curveballs that don't feel like curveballs at all--they drop in unusual elements, but these strange pieces feel completely natural alongside their more traditional material." Redefine magazine critic Peter Woodburn thought that "Rohnert Park is a great album that meanders a bit at times but quickly blasts itself back on track." Adam Thomas of Sputnikmusic stated that "goes beyond making a statement, it reaffirms the continued survival of punk in not only this decade, but the decade after, and the decade after that."

== Track listing ==
All tracks are written by Ceremony.

| No. | Title | Length |
|---|---|---|
| 1. | "Into the Wayside Part I/Sick" | 4:02 |
| 2. | "M.C.D.F." | 1:52 |
| 3. | "Moving Principle" | 2:33 |
| 4. | "The Doldrums (Friendly City)" | 3:02 |
| 5. | "Open Head" | 2:08 |
| 6. | "Into the Wayside Part II" | 3:31 |
| 7. | "Terminal Addiction" | 1:46 |
| 8. | "Don't Touch Me" | 2:13 |
| 9. | "Back in '84" | 1:15 |
| 10. | "All the Time" | 1:22 |
| 11. | "The Pathos" | 1:22 |
| 12. | "Nigh to Life" | 1:10 |
| 13. | "Into the Wayside Part III" (includes the hidden track In the Land of Lawmen and Lawwomen, which starts at 7:06) | 9:28 |
| Total length: | | 35:22 |

== Personnel ==
- Ross Farrar – vocals
- Anthony Anzaldo – guitars
- Ryan Mattos – guitars
- Justin Davis – bass
- Jake Casarotti – drums

Technical personnel

- Recorded, mixed, produced by Dan Rathbun
