= Koyo (band) =

American punk band

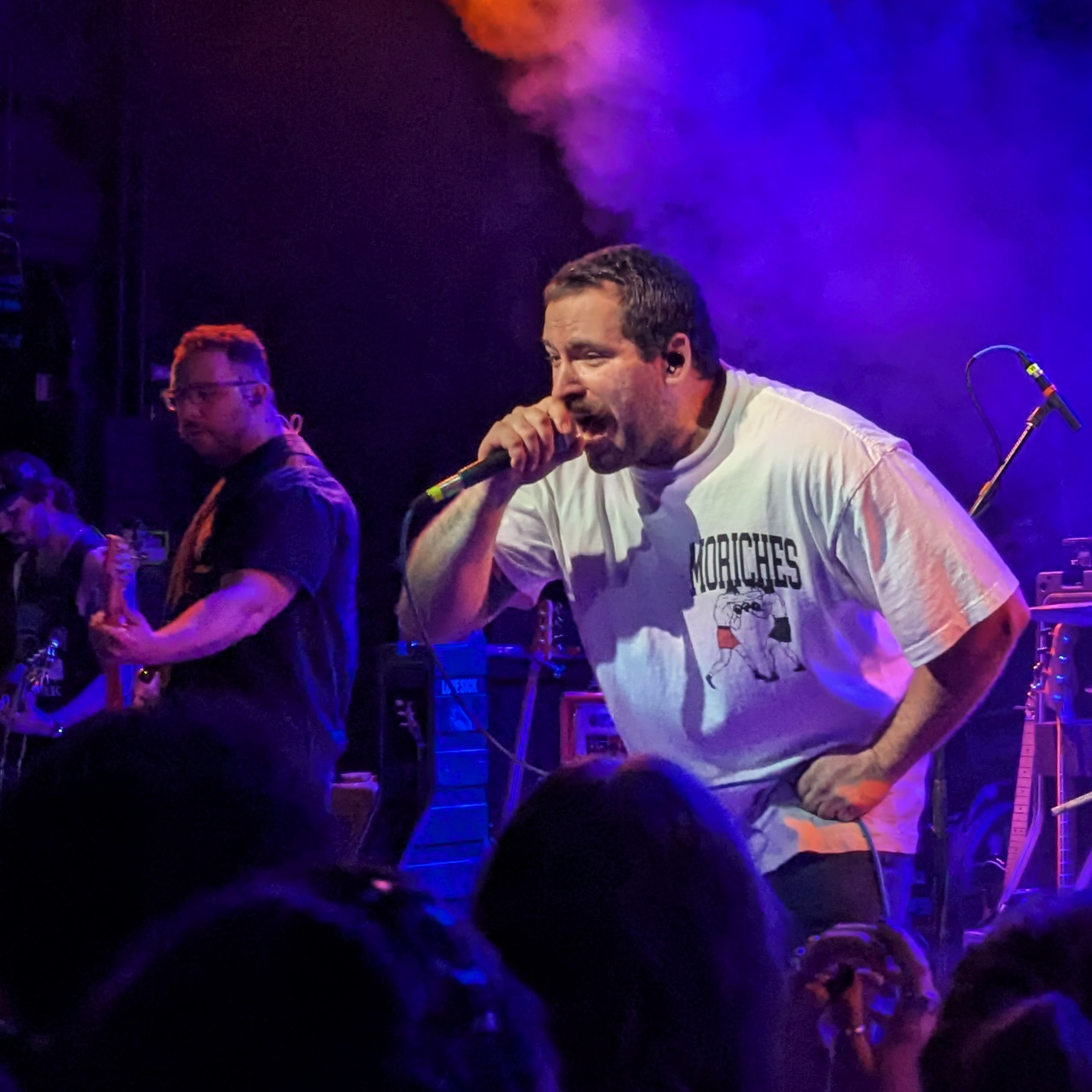
- Koyo at Toad's Place (New Haven, CT). June 7 2026.

Background information
- Origin: Stony Brook, New York, U.S.
- Genres: Emo; pop punk; melodic hardcore
- Years active: 2020–present
- Label: Pure Noise Records
- Spinoff of: SeeYouSpaceCowboy; Typecaste; Rain of Salvation; Hangman; Adrenaline
- Members: Joey Chiaramonte; TJ Rotolico; Sal Argento; Harold Griffin; Stephen Spanos
- Website: koyolihc.com

Koyo is an American punk band formed in 2020 in Stony Brook, New York. They released their debut EP Painting Words into Lines in March 2020. In 2022, Koyo signed a record deal with Pure Noise Records.

The band's music has been compared to Long Island emo, pop punk and melodic hardcore bands such as Taking Back Sunday and The Movielife.

== History ==
Koyo formed in 2020 in Stony Brook, New York; the band describes themselves as playing "Stony Brook hardcore." Most of Koyo's members played in other hardcore bands such as SeeYouSpaceCowboy, Typecaste, Rain of Salvation, Hangman and Adrenaline. As all of the members were longtime friends before deciding to record music together, the ultimate goal was to "start more bands with the same core group of friends and see what sticks," according to vocalist Joey Chiaramonte, who is also the bassist of the band Typecaste. Another band, Soul Provider, also came out of this exercise.

Originally named The L Word after the song "Taming the L Word" by Long Island melodic hardcore band Silent Majority, guitarist Mike Marazzo suggested the name "Koyo", named after the Japanese term for the colors of leaves changing in autumn.

On March 14, 2020, the band released their debut EP Painting Words Into Lines. This was followed by the EP Drives Out East on July 6, 2021. The EP's lead single "Moriches", named after Moriches Road on Long Island, came out a week earlier along with a music video.

On March 7, 2022, Koyo signed to Pure Noise Records and released a new single, "Ten Digits Away".

Koyo toured in the fall of 2021 with Anxious as a USA headliner. In the spring of 2022, the band supported Knocked Loose. They have toured in support of Stick to Your Guns. They supported Silverstein in Europe in November 2022. The band has also played a number of hardcore festivals all across the United States including LDB Fest, FYA Fest, Sound & Fury, and the Triple B Showcase, among others.

On May 18, 2023, Koyo announced that their debut LP, Would You Miss It?, released on September 29, 2023. The band also released a lead single, "You're on the List (Minus One)", along with a music video.

On February 2, 2026, the band announced their single "Irreversible", along with their second studio album, Barely Here, to be released on May 8 on the same year.

== Influences ==
Koyo has named Long Island emo and melodic hardcore bands as influences, including Brand New, Crime in Stereo, Glassjaw, Taking Back Sunday and The Movielife.

== Band members ==
Current members

- Joey Chiaramonte – lead vocals (2020–present)
- TJ Rotolico – guitar (2020–present)
- Harold Griffin – guitar, backup vocals (2020–present)
- Stephen Spanos – bass (2020–present)
- Sal Argento – drums (2020–present)

Former members

- Mike Marazzo – guitar (2020–2022)

== Discography ==
=== Studio albums ===
Year	Album	Label
2023	Would You Miss It?	Pure Noise
2026	Barely Here	Pure Noise

=== Compilation albums ===
Year	Album	Label
2022	Drives Out East Deluxe	Triple-B Records

=== Extended plays ===
Year	Album	Label
2020	Short Beach Sessions	DAZE
2020	Painting Words into Lines	The Coming Strife Records
2021	Drives Out East	Triple-B Records
2022	Ten Digits Away	Pure Noise
2024	Mile a Minute	Pure Noise

=== Music videos ===
- "Moriches" (2020)
- "Ten Digits Away" (2022)
- "Straight North" (2022)
- "Call It Off" (2022)
- "You're on the List (Minus One)" (2023)
- "Anthem" (2023)
- "Life's a Pill" (2023)
- "Crushed" (2023)
- "Ten Digits Away" (Deluxe) (2024)
- "I Might Not Get Through All of This" (2024)
- "Mile A Minute" (2024)
- "Irreversible" (2026)
- "What I'm Worth" (2026)
- "You Hate Me" (2026)
- "Barely Here" (2026)
