= Zoo (Ceremony album) =

Studio album by Ceremony
- Released: March 5, 2012
- Genre: Garage rock; punk rock
- Length: 36:29
- Label: Matador
- Producer: Dan Rathbun

Ceremony chronology
Rohnert Park (2010)	Zoo (2012)	The L-Shaped Man (2015)

Singles from Zoo
- 1. "Hysteria" Released: January 5, 2012; 2. "Adult" Released: February 17, 2012

Zoo is the fourth studio album by American punk rock band Ceremony. Zoo was released on March 5, 2012 through Matador Records.

== Track listing ==
No.	Title	Length
1.	"Hysteria"	2:34
2.	"Citizen"	2:04
3.	"Repeating the Circle"	3:13
4.	"World Blue"	1:37
5.	"Quarantine"	3:07
6.	"Brace Yourself"	4:11
7.	"Adult"	3:06
8.	"Hotel"	2:30
9.	"Ordinary People"	2:22
10.	"Nosebleed"	4:23
11.	"Community Service"	2:52
12.	"Video"	4:30
Total length:		36:29
