= Youngest Daughter (song) =

Song by Superheaven

from the album Jar
- Released: April 30, 2013
- Recorded: December 2012
- Studio: Studio 4 Recording Studios, West Conshohocken, Pennsylvania
- Genre: Grunge
- Length: 4:09
- Label: Run for Cover
- Songwriters: Taylor Madison; Jake Clarke; Joe Kane; Zack Robbins
- Producer: Will Yip

"Youngest Daughter" is a song by American rock band Superheaven, appearing on the band's debut studio album Jar. Despite not being released as a single, the song has become the band's most popular, reaching over 100 million streams on Spotify.

== Lyrics and music ==
Written collectively by the band, the lyrics to "Youngest Daughter" focus on Taylor Madison's sister and her struggles with heroin addiction.

Fred Thomas of AllMusic described the song's sound as "somewhere between Sunny Day Real Estate and Alice in Chains."

== Popularity ==
"Youngest Daughter" gained widespread popularity in the early 2020s after it was featured in several TikTok videos, with Jake Clarke commenting that it "was really exciting to see that there was still interest in the band." The song would gain further popularity after it was sampled by American rappers Yeat and Bnyx in their song "Go Again."

Thanks to its viral popularity, "Youngest Daughter" would reach 100 million streams on Spotify and chart 10 years after its initial release.

== Charts ==
Chart performance for "Youngest Daughter"
Chart (2023)	Peak position
US Hot Rock & Alternative Songs (Billboard)	22
US Hot Alternative Songs (Billboard)	17
US Hot Rock Songs (Billboard)	14

== Personnel ==
Superheaven

- Taylor Madison – lead vocals, rhythm guitar
- Jake Clarke – lead guitar, backing vocals
- Joe Kane – bass
- Zach Robbins – drums, backing vocals
