= Heaven Is Earth =

Studio album by Self Defense Family
- Released: June 30, 2015
- Studio: GodCity Studios (Salem, MA); Dead Air Studio (Amherst, MA); Miner Street Recordings (Philadelphia, PA); Sone Lab (East Hampton, MA)
- Genre: Post-punk; shoegaze
- Length: 31:21
- Label: Deathwish
- Producer: Kurt Ballou; Will Killingsworth; Jon Low; Mark Miller

Self Defense Family chronology
Self Love (2015)	Heaven Is Earth (2015)	Have You Considered Punk Music (2018)

Singles from Heaven Is Earth
- 1. "Talia" / "Taxying" Released: April 18, 2015

Heaven Is Earth is a studio album by the American rock band Self Defense Family. It's the band's fifth studio album overall, and second effort after changing its name from End of a Year to Self Defense Family. The album was released on June 30, 2015 through Deathwish Inc.

== Background ==
For Heaven Is Earth, Self Defense Family recorded two tracks with four producers in four different cities on the East Coast of the United States for a total of eight songs. The band recorded with Kurt Ballou of Converge at GodCity Studios in Salem, Massachusetts; with former Orchid and Ampere member Will Killingsworth at Dead Air Studio in Amherst, Massachusetts; with Jon Low, who previously worked with Kurt Vile and The National, at Miner Street Recordings in Philadelphia, Pennsylvania; and with Mark Miller, who previously worked with Dinosaur Jr. and Garth Brooks, at Sone Lab in Easthampton, Massachusetts.

A limited edition 7" single for the Heaven Is Earth's second track "Talia" accompanied by the B-side track "Taxying," which was an outtake from the album's sessions, was released for Record Store Day 2015 with cover art nearly identical to that of its parent album, with the exception of the person in the center of the image being absent. A release for the music video for "Talia" coincided with the album's official announcement date of May 4, 2015. On the subject of the video, Self Defense Family vocalist Patrick Kindlon said: "The video is not so much inspired by but directly ripped off from the Talk Talk 'It's My Life' music video — the best music video in human history. Eventually, we'll do one of those 'band playing in a warehouse' videos. But until then, you get stock footage of animals." On June 2, Self Defense Family released a music video for the album's closing track, "Dave Sim."

== Musical style ==
According to SLUG magazine's Kamryn Feigel, Heaven Is Earth is "a downtempo, post-punk menagerie of droning drums and screaming vocals." AllMusic critic Mark Deming wrote that, on the record, Self Defense Family "build a chain-link fence of sound, with decisive bass and drum patterns woven through guitar figures strummed or pummeled into minimal melodic structures as vocalist and first-among-equals Patrick Kindlon rants and bellows over it all." Pitchfork's Ian Cohen noted the influence of shoegazing over the album, stating: "There’s all the whammy bar abuse and tonal clusters of the genre, but it’s gone straight-edge, with none of the disorientation and gushing ambience."

== Critical reception ==
Professional ratings
Review scores
Source	Rating
AllMusic	3.5/5 stars
Pitchfork	6.3/10

The album generally received mixed-to-positive reviews from music critics. AllMusic's Mark Deming wrote: "Maybe you can't pogo or mosh to it, but Heaven Is Earth is the kind of music that will please those with a taste for aural experimentation and annoy the narrow-minded, and that is punk rock in all the best ways." Ian Cohen of Pitchfork thought that the album "finds few ways to enhance what you could gain from Kindlon’s interviews or the lyrics sheet—an album that’s literally more interesting on paper." SLUG critic Kamryn Feigel stated: "If you can get through the first few tracks, it gets easier, but Heaven is Earth isn’t anything you need to rush out and grab for your collection."

== Track listing ==
1. "In My Defens Self Me Defend" – 5:37
2. "Talia" – 2:55
3. "Prison Ring" – 2:10
4. "Ditko" – 3:35
5. "Everybody Wants a Prize For Feeling" – 3:16
6. "Heaven Is Earth" – 7:23
7. "Basic Skills" – 3:30
8. "Dave Sim" – 3:00
