= LDB Fest =

- Genre: Hardcore punk, post-hardcore, alternative rock
- Frequency: Annually
- Venue: Mellwood Art Center, Triple Crown Pavilion
- Location: Louisville, Kentucky
- Website: ldbbbfest.com

LDB Fest is an American music festival held at the Mellwood Art Center in Louisville, Kentucky. It is focused on hardcore punk music, and is one of the largest annual events related to the genre in the world, according to Stereogum. The festival began hosting bands in different styles in recent years. It has also been held at the Triple Crown Pavilion in the city. The 2025 lineup consisted of English rock band Basement and American alternative rock band Superheaven. The 2026 lineup is slated to feature Saves the Day, Terror, All Out War and On Broken Wings.
