= Self Defense Family =

American rock band, founded 2003

- Also known as: End of a Year, End of a Year Self Defense Family, Self Defense, Barf Spectrum, The Actuaries, World Shut Your Mouth, Comforter, Weird Field, Pewter Wizards
- Origin: Cohoes, New York, United States
- Genres: Post-hardcore, post-punk, indie rock, emo
- Years active: 2003–present
- Labels: Run for Cover, Deathwish, Revelation, Protagonist
- Spinoffs: Drug Church, Comfort Woman, Aficionado, Troubled Sleep, Loss Leader, Mary and the Small Omission, Twin Cisterns
- Spinoff of: Creative Adult
- Members: Patrick Kindlon; Andrew Duggan; Chris Tenerowicz; Alan Huck; Mark O'Brien; Benjamin Tate; Kaila Stone; Adam McIlwee; Caroline Corrigan; Andy Rice; E. Tobin; Mary Brulatour; Mathew Morand; Mike Fenton; Nick Warchol; Brandon Wegg; Anikke Myers; Tyler Bussey; Alex Morton; Callum Barry
- Past members: David Zeidman; Mike Brandenburg; Steve Hegner; John Van Urgent; Eric Busta; Hans Leibold; Sean Doody; Seth Sauca; Ian Shelton; Harry Bartrum
- Website: selfdefensemusic.com

Self Defense Family (shortened to Self Defense and previously known as End of a Year) are an American post-hardcore band with members from across the United States, United Kingdom, and Iceland. The band has released six full-length albums and several EPs and splits. Their sixth and latest studio album Have You Considered Punk Music was released June 29, 2018, on Run For Cover Records.

== History ==
End of a Year started as a side project for a number of musicians based in Albany, New York, already involved in full-time bands. Having spent time in heavier bands, the initial End of a Year line-up was interested in trying something more overtly melodic. Taking their name from an Embrace song, the band's original sound was highly influenced by the Revolution Summer-era DC bands.

The band recorded a boombox demo to give out at their first show, which took place at SUNY Albany. Shortly thereafter, a more formal demo entitled "Warm" was recorded. A full-length, Disappear Here, appeared on local labels Oneohfive and Losingface Records. The band later released a split 7-inch with western Massachusetts band Three Fifteen on another local label, Slave Union. It was this record that caught the attention of Revelation Records, and the band made the jump in 2006, recording their first full-length for the California label in the spring of that year.

Sincerely was recorded with Don Zientara at Inner Ear Studio, adding to the perception that the band was striving for a DC-centered sound; the actual music, however, strayed further from that model than on previous releases.

In the spring of 2009, the band released an EP for Deathwish Inc. and announced plans for a full-length release for the label. In 2010, Deathwish Inc released the band's third full-length album entitled You Are Beneath Me.

The band regularly names songs after actual people with lyrical content that, though oblique, seems to reference the person. Some people the band has given song titles to include:

- Audrey Kishline, former proponent of Moderation Management
- Micheal Ray Richardson, former NBA basketball player and current coach of the Lawton-Fort Sill Cavalry
- Michael Larson, notable for his record-breaking winnings on the American game show Press Your Luck
- William Kennedy, author and Albany, New York-area resident
- Charles Rocket, late comedian and actor
- Marissa Wendolovske, contemporary artist
- Eddie Antar, one time proprietor of Crazy Eddie Electronics
- Philip José Farmer, American sci-fi/fantasy author
- Emanuela Orlandi, teenage girl whose Vatican City disappearance remains unsolved
- Dave Sim, Canadian cartoonist and publisher

In late 2010, the band announced that they would be "reformatting" the group to officially include all touring and session musicians they had worked with up to that point as well as changing the group's name to Self Defense Family. To go along with this announcement, they posted four songs from the You Are Beneath Me LP with Patrick Kindlon's lead vocal track removed and replaced by vocals from Caroline Corrigan, including one song that was also reworked into an acoustic version. The band's tours have since been done on the basis of whoever is available at the time, with the same attitude being taken towards picking line-ups for their studio output. This format was taken to its furthest extent early on when one line-up of the band played a gig in Connecticut while another line-up traveled to Jamaica to record music for the first 7-inch in their Island Series of singles. As such, no member of Self Defense Family has played every show or played on every recording.

== Band name ==
The group formed in 2003 under the name "End of a Year" derived from an Embrace song of the same name. After the release of their 2010 album You Are Beneath Me, the group wanted to change their name to "Self Defense". As an interim name to ease the transition between names, Self Defense went by the name "End Of A Year Self Defense Family", and occasionally "Self Defense Music". Vocalist Patrick Kindlon likened the transition to Will Oldham's name changes. According to Kindlon, Oldham's band name went from "Palace Brothers to Palace Songs to Palace Music to Bonnie Prince Billy to Will Oldham." On various vinyl releases, Self Defense used several "also known as" monikers including: Barf Spectrum, Meredith Hunter, Comforter, Pewter Wizards, and Weird Field.

== Discography ==
The band is known for its high output, often releasing a full-length album and several short efforts in a single year, normally through several different labels. Among them includes 4–5 song EP sometimes with specific themes, like the relationship focused Duets and Superior which is centred on the movement to make the Upper Peninsula the 51st state.

In early 2011, the band debuted the first volume of its "Island Series" Volume One: Jamaica, and have released splits and collaborative EPs with a wide variety of bands including post-hardcore band Touché Amoré, post-punk band Creative Adult, hardcore punk band Axis, and even themselves under the pseudonym Meredith Hunter. They have likened these shorter outputs to "one night stands".

Self Defense Family discography
- Studio albums: 6
- Extended plays: 17
- Singles: 10
- Splits: 17

=== Studio albums ===
Album	Year	Label	Band name
Disappear Here	2004	Oneohfive	End of a Year
Sincerely	2006	Revelation	End of a Year
You Are Beneath Me	2010	Deathwish Inc.	End of a Year
Try Me	2014	Deathwish Inc.	Self Defense Family
Heaven Is Earth	2015	Deathwish Inc.	Self Defense Family
Have You Considered Punk Music	2018	Run for Cover Records	Self Defense Family

=== Singles and EPs ===
Album	Year	Label	Band name
Warm	2004	Self-released	End of a Year
We Understand Europeans Are a Sexual People	2007	Blacktop	End of a Year
End of a Year	2009	Deathwish Inc.	End of a Year
More Songs About Transportation and Intercourse	2010	Hex	End of a Year
The Sorrowful and Immaculate Heart of Emanuela Orlandi	2011	Disposable Culture	End of a Year
End of a Year with Caroline Corrigan	2011	Self-released	End of a Year
I Heard Crime Gets You Off	2011	Run for Cover Records	End of a Year, Self Defense Family
I'm Going Through Some Shit	2011	Deathwish Inc.	Self Defense Family
Self Immolation Family	2012	Deathwish Inc.	Self Defense Family
Live From Krazy Fest	2012	Head2Wall	Self Defense Family
The Corrections Officer In Me	2013	Family Drugs	Self Defense Family
You Are Beneath Her	2013	Iron Pier	Self Defense Family
Two Genuine Oddities From Our Distant Past	2014	Driftwood Records	Self Defense Family
I Tried To Make Something You Would Enjoy	2014	Triple-B Records	Self Defense Family
Indoor Wind Chimes	2014	Deathwish Inc.	Self Defense Family
Duets	2014	Iron Pier	Self Defense Family
Talia	2015	Deathwish Inc.	Self Defense Family
When The Barn Caves In b/w Alan	2015	Iron Pier	Self Defense Family
Superior	2016	Run For Cover Records	Self Defense Family
The Power Does Not Work In the Presence Of Nonbelievers	2016	Bad Paintings	Self Defense Family
Colicky	2016	Iron Pier	Self Defense Family
Bastard Form b/w Maybe You Could Explain It To Me	2017	Alternative Labels	Self Defense Family
BBC Session	2017	Deathwish Inc.	Self Defense Family
Wounded Masculinity	2017	Triple-B Records	Self Defense Family
Working People (Part 1)	2018	Run For Cover Records	Self Defense Family
Performative Guilt	2019	6131 Records	Self Defense Family
Kitten Beach	2020	Run For Cover Records	Self Defense Family
Jesus Of Nazareth	2020	Run For Cover Records	Self Defense Family
Leeds	2020	Run For Cover Records	Self Defense Family
Long Island	2020	Iron Pier	Self Defense Family
Make Me A Pallet Fire On Your Floor b/w Local Clerics	2020	Run For Cover Records	Self Defense Family

=== Splits ===
Album	Year	Label	Split with	Band name
We Mate for Life	2005	Slave Union	Three Fifteen	End of a Year
End of a Year / Fire Team Charlie	2006	Sticky Translucent Goo	Fire Team Charlie	End of a Year
End of a Year / Kids Explode	2007	Narshardaa	Kids Explode	End of a Year
Adorno / End of a Year	2008	Existencia	Adorno	End of a Year AKA Comforter
End of a Year / Red Tape Parade	2008	Cobra X	Red Tape Parade	End of a Year
Shook Ones / End of a Year	2008	Runner Up	Shook Ones	End of a Year
End of a Year / Segwei	2010	Alliance Trax	Segwei	End of a Year
Split Recording	2011	Trouble Monkey	Fires	Self Defense Family
Tigers Jaw / The World Is a Beautiful Place & I Am No Longer Afraid to Die / Code Orange Kids / Self Defense Family	2013	Run For Cover Records	Code Orange Kids, Tigers Jaw, The World Is a Beautiful Place & I Am No Longer Afraid to Die	Self Defense Family
Stalwart Sons / Self Defense Family	2013	Revolution Winter	Stalwart Sons	Self Defense Family
Self Defense Family / Goodtime Boys	2013	Palm Reader	Goodtime Boys	Self Defense Family
Least Violent Time In Human History	2013	Harm Reduction	Axis	Self Defense Family
Run For Cover Records - Mixed Singles Vol. 1	2013	Run For Cover Records	Creative Adult, Anne, Grey Zine	Self Defense Family
Self Defense Family / Meredith Hunter	2014	Run For Cover Records	Meredith Hunter	Self Defense Family/Meredith Hunter
Self Love	2015	Deathwish Inc.	Touché Amoré	Self Defense Family
Self Defense Family / Creative Adult	2015	Deathwish Inc.	Creative Adult	Self Defense Family
Split 7-inch	2016	Protagonist Music	Null	Self Defense Family

=== Compilation albums ===
Album	Year	Label	Band name
German Industrial Ballads	2015	Bad Paintings	Self Defense Family

=== Live albums ===
Album	Year	Label	Band name
Live From Krazy Fest	2012	Head2Wall Records	Self Defense Family
Law of Karma Live: Fake Shit Wins But Not Tonight	2023	Landland Colportage	Self Defense Family

=== Videos ===
- The Things You Like / I'm Going Through Some Shit (Split Music Video with Aficionado) (2011)
- Tithe Pig (2014)
- Talia (2015)
- Dave Sim (2015)
- The Supremacy of Pure Artistic Feeling (2018)
- Have You Considered Punk Music (2018)

=== Other ===
Title	Year	Item	Publisher	Band name
Run The Dungeon	2021	Graphic novel	Z2 Comics	Self Defense Family
