= Violence Violence =

Studio album by Ceremony
- Released: July 2006
- Recorded: April 13 & 14, 2006 at Castle Ultimate Studios, Oakland, California
- Genres: Hardcore punk; powerviolence
- Length: 13:14 (LP); 20:31 (CD)
- Labels: Malfunction; Deathwish Inc.
- Producer: Zack Ohren

Ceremony chronology
| Ruined (2005) | Violence Violence (2006) | Scared People (2007) |

Violence Violence is the debut full-length album from American hardcore punk band Ceremony. The vinyl release of the album contains the original 13 song track list, while the CD version includes the band's previous effort, 2005's Ruined EP.

While officially a full-length album, Violence Violence offers 13 songs in just over 13 minutes, with many tracks consisting of short, chaotic bursts of energy that last mere seconds. Deathwish Inc. released vinyl edition plays the album in its entirety twice, once on each side of the LP. Guitarist Anthony Anzaldo has said that he was influenced by the music of punk bands Pg. 99 and Tragedy while writing music for the album.

== Reception ==
Professional ratings
Review scores
| Source | Rating |
|---|---|
| Punknews.org | 4.5/5 stars |

As Ceremony's first full-length release, Violence Violence was met with wide acclaim from hardcore punk enthusiasts. Punknews.org named the record "a modern hardcore masterpiece". Critics and fans praised the raw energy on the record, the band's dynamism, and the songs' abilities to generate physically impassioned performances.

== Track listing ==
All tracks are written by Ceremony, except "Pressure's On" by Red C.

| No. | Title | Length |
|---|---|---|
| 1. | "Violence" | 1:15 |
| 2. | "Ghosts" | 1:09 |
| 3. | "Living Hell" | 0:32 |
| 4. | "My Hands Are Made Of Spite" | 1:24 |
| 5. | "Along" | 1:02 |
| 6. | "Nail" | 0:42 |
| 7. | "Bite Down" | 0:27 |
| 8. | "Cross Them Out" | 0:21 |
| 9. | "Violence" | 1:25 |
| 10. | "Clouds Of Fire" | 0:19 |
| 11. | "Pressure's On" | 2:00 |
| 12. | "Walking Home" | 1:45 |
| 13. | "Asleep" | 0:53 |
| Total length: | | 13:14 |

CD bonus tracks
| No. | Title | Length |
|---|---|---|
| 14. | "Kersed" | 1:11 |
| 15. | "It's Going To Be A Cold Winter" | 0:15 |
| 16. | "This Is My War" | 0:43 |
| 17. | "You're All The Same" | 0:42 |
| 18. | "Troubled Waters" | 0:34 |
| 19. | "Throwing Bricks" | 1:59 |
| 20. | "I Want To Put This To An End" | 1:53 |
| Total length: | | 20:31 |

The CD release of the album includes their debut EP release, Ruined, as seven bonus tracks.

== Personnel ==
- Ross Farrar – vocals
- Anthony Anzaldo – guitars
- Ryan Mattos – guitars
- Justin Davis – bass
- Jake Cazarotti – drums

Technical personnel

- Zack Ohren – producer
- Linas Garsys – artwork
