= Ceremony (punk band) =

American punk rock band

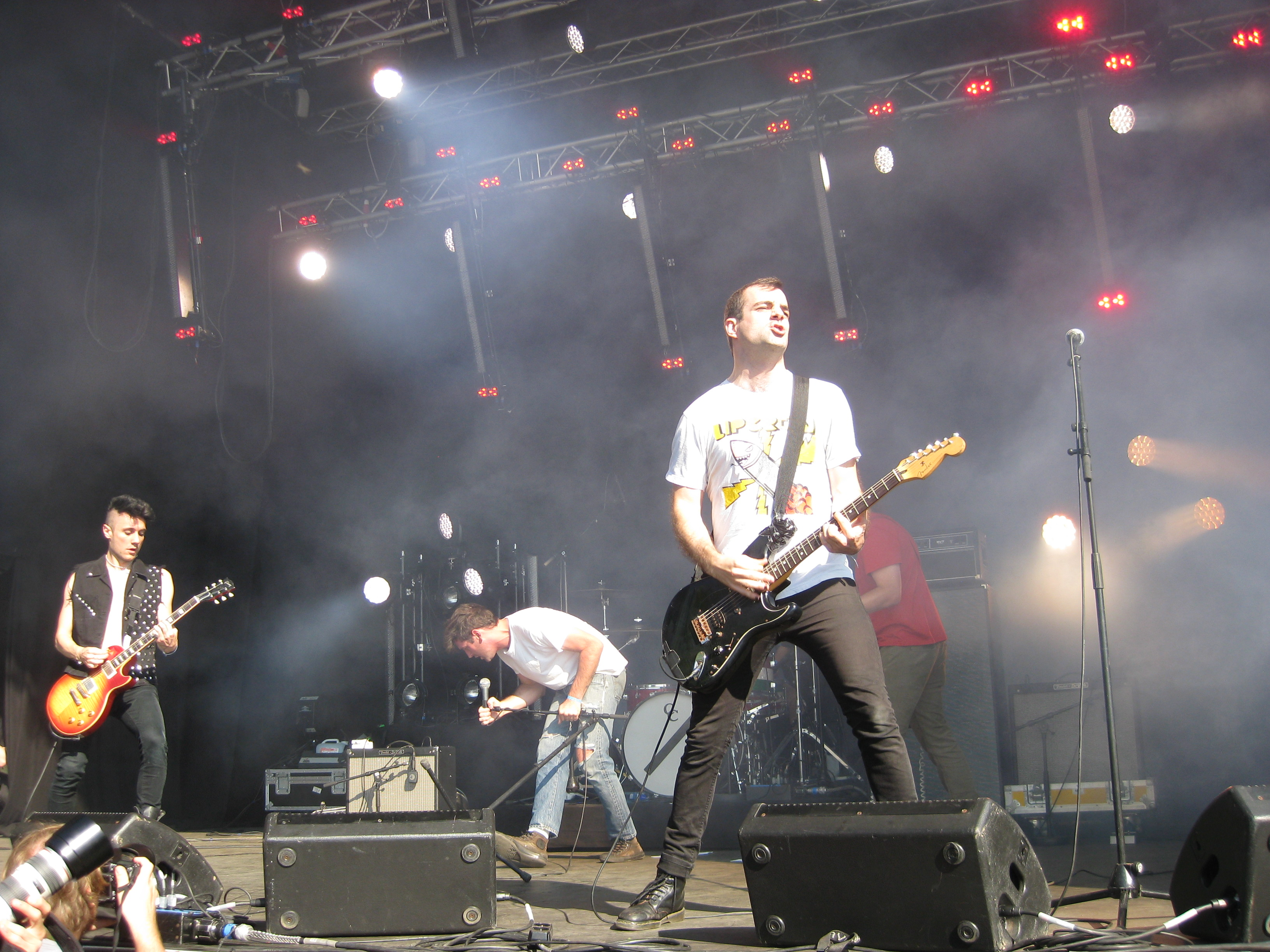
- Ceremony at Øyafestivalen in Oslo, Norway, 2012

Background information
- Origin: Rohnert Park, California, U.S.
- Genres: Punk rock; post-punk; hardcore punk; powerviolence
- Years active: 2004–present
- Labels: Relapse Records, Matador, Bridge 9, Deathwish Inc., Malfunction
- Members: Ross Farrar; Anthony Anzaldo; Andy Nelson; Jake Casarotti; Justin Davis
- Past members: Ryan Mattos
- Website: ceremonyhc.com

Ceremony is an American punk rock band from Rohnert Park, California. The band's current line-up features Ross Farrar (vocals), Anthony Anzaldo (guitar), Justin Davis (bass), Andy Nelson (guitar), and Jake Casarotti (drums). Ryan Mattos (guitar) left before the group's Matador Records signing in 2011, being replaced by Nelson. The band have released six studio albums to date, and have changed their sound considerably across their discography – ranging from elements of powerviolence, grindcore, hardcore punk, punk rock, garage rock, post-punk, indie rock and new wave. Pitchfork once wrote that "Ceremony are hell-bent on not making the same record twice", while Stereogum described the band as "a very good punk band executing old punk tricks to massive effectiveness".

== History ==
Ceremony formed in Rohnert Park, California, and recorded their first demo in December 2004. The band was originally named Violent World, before later changing to Ceremony. The name was chosen for the song of the same name by New Order.

In 2005, the band released the EP Ruined on Malfunction Records. This release was followed by their critically acclaimed first full-length album, Violence Violence, which included a re-recorded version of the Ruined EP.

2008 saw the release of Still Nothing Moves You, the band's first release on Bridge 9 Records, described by Keith Carman in Exclaim! magazine as "hardcore's equivalent of Hiroshima", which placed on Billboard's Top Internet and Top Heatseekers charts in August 2008.

After touring with bands including Blacklisted, Converge, and AFI, they released their third full-length album, Rohnert Park, in 2010.

In 2011, the band confirmed they had signed with Matador Records, and their final Bridge 9 release would be a covers-only EP, featuring the band's take on songs by Urban Waste, Pixies, Crisis, Eddie and the Subtitles, Vile and Wire.

In March 2012, the band released the album Zoo on Matador Records, which was an even bigger departure from the harder style than the Rohnert Park album was, with the new record focusing on a more proto-punk sound in the style of Wire's Pink Flag album.

On May 19, 2015, they released their second album on Matador, titled The L-Shaped Man. The record saw them move even further into the post-punk realm, with many comparing the album's sound to that of Joy Division. Three singles were released from the album: "Your Life in France" and the double-A side "The Separation"/"The Understanding".

Their sixth album, In the Spirit World Now, was released through Relapse Records on August 23, 2019. The album sported three singles: "Turn Away the Bad Thing", the title track, and "Presaging the End".

== Musical style ==
The band's main influences include The Ventures, Joy Division, T.S.O.L., Christian Death, and The Beach Boys. The band have also expressed their love of bands and artists such as Oasis, Violent Femmes, Prince, Ramones and The Cure. They are known for the consistent evolution of their sound, gradually leaving behind the powerviolence and hardcore punk style exhibited on Ruined and Violence Violence with subsequent releases, exploring elements of '80s-inspired hardcore punk (Still Nothing Moves You), post-hardcore (Rohnert Park), garage rock (Zoo), post-punk (The L-Shaped Man) and new wave (In the Spirit World Now). The band's early sound has been compared to that of Infest, Crossed Out, and No Comment, described as a "non-stop bludgeoning of sonic fury" and "fast, brutal hardcore".

== Members ==
Current

- Ross Farrar – lead vocals (2005–present)
- Anthony Anzaldo – guitar, keytar, piano, keyboards, synthesizer, backing vocals (2005–present)
- Jake Casarotti – drums (2005–present)
- Justin Davis – bass (2005–present; absent from touring 2022–2024)
- Andy Nelson – guitar, backing vocals (2011–present)

Former

- Ryan Mattos – guitar, backing vocals (2005–2011)

Touring

- Jasmine Watson – keyboards, percussion (2024–present), bass (2022–2024; substitute for Justin Davis), backing vocals (2022–present)

== Discography ==
=== Studio albums ===
- Violence Violence (Deathwish Inc./Malfunction Records, 2006)
- Still Nothing Moves You (Bridge 9 Records, 2008)
- Rohnert Park (Bridge 9 Records, 2010)
- Zoo (Matador Records, 2012)
- The L-Shaped Man (Matador Records, 2015)
- In the Spirit World Now (Relapse Records, 2019)
- Tell Me Your Dream (Relapse Records, 2026)

=== EPs ===
- Ruined (Malfunction Records, 2005)
- Scared People (Bridge 9 Records, 2007)
- Ceremony 6 Cover Songs (Bridge 9 Records, 2011)

=== Singles ===
- "He-God-Has Favored Our Undertakings" (Bridge 9 Records, 2008)
- "Sick" (Bridge 9 Records, 2010)
- "Hysteria" (Matador Records, 2012)
- "Adult" (Matador Records, 2012)
- "The Understanding" (Matador Records, 2015)
- "The Separation" (Matador Records, 2015)
- "Your Life in France" (Matador Records, 2015)
- "Turn Away the Bad Thing" (Relapse Records, 2019)
- "Vanity Spawned by Fear" b/w "California Poppy" (Relapse Records, 2022)
- "Other Hells" (Relapse Records, 2026)
- "Death Destruction Mayhem" (Relapse Records, 2026)

=== Compilation contributions ===
- "Tourette's" (originally by Nirvana; tribute album In Utero, in Tribute, in Entirety) (2014, Robotic Empire)

=== Music videos ===
- World Blue (2012)
- Adult (2012)
- The Separation + the Understanding (2015)
- Your Life in France (2015)
- Turn Away the Bad Thing (2019)
- Vanity Spawned By Fear (2022)

== See also ==
- List of bands from the San Francisco Bay Area
- List of hardcore punk bands
- List of post-punk bands
- Music of California
