= Hesitation Wounds =

American hardcore punk band

- Origin: United States
- Genres: Hardcore punk
- Years active: 2012–present
- Labels: Deathwish, Secret Voice, 6131
- Members: Jeremy Bolm; Neeraj Kane; Stephen LaCour; Thomas Cantwell
- Past members: Jay Weinberg

Hesitation Wounds is an American hardcore punk supergroup formed in 2012. The band was founded by Jeremy Bolm of Touché Amoré; guitarist Neeraj Kane of The Hope Conspiracy and formerly of The Suicide File and Holy Fever; bassist Stephen LaCour of True Cross and formerly of Trap Them; and Jay Weinberg, the son of Max Weinberg (E Street Band, The Max Weinberg 7), who previously performed with Madball and Against Me!, and eventually joined Slipknot.

In 2012, Bolm wanted to gather a group of musicians he was a fan of and quickly record some songs together. He recruited Kane and LaCour, who had met before but never recorded together, and Weinberg, who Bolm knew through Against Me! but had never met either of the other members. Under the name Hesitation Wounds, the group met in California and wrote three songs and an intro in about 5 hours in May of that year. The group felt that the songs were "awesome" and recorded them the following day. These songs comprised the band's self-titled 7" debut EP that was released nearly a year later in April 2013 through Secret Voice, an imprint of Deathwish Inc. and founded by Bolm. Hesitation Wounds only performed a small handful of live performances in support of the EP before the members grew busy with their primary bands.

Hesitation Wounds reconvened years later to record their debut studio album Awake for Everything, due out on May 27, 2016 through 6131 Records. Contrasting the impulsive nature of their EP, on Awake for Everything the band went into the writing process striving to harness the aggressive sounds of the 90s hardcore band Deadguy. The album was written in three days in mid-2015, recorded "in segments over time" with Alex Estrada and mixed by Kurt Ballou of Converge. Bolm's lyrics are said to be a mixture of personal and political themes, the latter of which he feels isn't the right fit for his primary band, Touché Amoré. Promotion for Awake for Everything began with an online stream of "Teeth", which Bolm said "reflects the musical background of each member into one short tune." The band also streamed the track "Guthrie" prior to the album's release, which was inspired by the original lyrics to Woody Guthrie's folk song "This Land Is Your Land" and current media coverage of the United States' illegal immigrant population.

Recorded in only a few days with Zach Tuch, Hesitation Wounds announced that it would release its second studio album, Chicanery, through Deathwish Inc. on August 30, 2019. For this record, Thomas Cantwell of Gouge Away replaced Weinberg on drums. Chicanery was expected to continue with the political leanings of Awake for Everything.

== Members ==
Current members

- Jeremy Bolm (Touché Amoré) – vocals (2012–present)
- Neeraj Kane (The Hope Conspiracy, The Suicide File) – guitar (2012–present)
- Stephen LaCour (True Cross, Trap Them) – bass (2012–present)
- Thomas Cantwell (Gouge Away, Axis) – drums (2019–present)

Former members

- Jay Weinberg (Slipknot, Against Me!, Madball) – drums (2012–2019)

== Discography ==
=== Studio albums ===
- Awake for Everything (2016, 6131 Records)
- Chicanery (2019, Deathwish Inc.)

=== EPs ===
- Hesitation Wounds (2013, Secret Voice)
