= Live on BBC Radio 1 =

EP (live) by Touché Amoré
- Released: 14 August 2012
- Genres: Post-hardcore; melodic hardcore; screamo
- Label: Deathwish
- Producer: Simon Askew

Touché Amoré chronology
Parting the Sea Between Brightness and Me (2011)	Live on BBC Radio 1 (2012)	Touché Amoré / The Casket Lottery (2012)

Live on BBC Radio 1 is a live EP by the American post-hardcore band Touché Amoré. The EP was recorded live at BBC Radio 1 studio with the show's host Mike Davies and engineer Simon Askew. Live on BBC Radio 1 also features guest vocals from Jordan Dreyer of La Dispute. The two bands were on tour in the UK together and recorded back-to-back sessions at BBC Radio 1. Touché Amoré vocalist Jeremy Bolm said recording with BBC was an honor and that "It's so storied there, where The Smiths and Joy Division and the Beatles—think about that. So I mean, we felt out of our element in one sense, but still got caught up in all the excitement."

== Track listing ==
1. "~"
2. "Home Away from Here"
3. "I'll Deserve Just That"
4. "Amends"
