= Waiting for Your Love (disambiguation) =

"Waiting for Your Love" is a song by Toto from Toto IV

Waiting for Your Love may also refer to:

- "Waiting for Your Love", a song by Alice Deejay from Who Needs Guitars Anyway?
- "Waiting for Your Love", a song by Alicia Keys from the UK version of As I Am
- "Waiting for Your Love", a song by Alyssa Milano from Do You See Me?
- "Waiting for Your Love", a song by Appleton from Everything's Eventual
- "Waiting for Your Love", a song by Peter Frampton from Peter Frampton
- "Waiting for Your Love", a song by the Reduction Agents from The Dance Reduction Agents
- "Waiting for Your Love", a song by Aleksander Walmann
- "Waiting for Your Love", a song by Alexandra Prince
- "Waiting for Your Love", a song by Cold War Kids
- "Waiting for Your Love", a song by Da Buzz
- "Waiting for Your Love", a song by Elena Ferretti
- "Waiting for Your Love", a song by Emma Wu
- "Waiting for Your Love", a song by Jacqueline Pang
- "Waiting for Your Love", a song by Stevie B
- "Waiting for Your Love", a song by Virginia Wolf

== See also ==
- Wait for Love
- Waiting for Love
