= Part and Parcel =

EP by Make Do and Mend
- Released: November 22, 2011
- Genre: Acoustic
- Label: Paper + Plastick
- Producer: Greg Thomas

Make Do and Mend chronology
End Measured Mile (2010)	Part and Parcel (2011)

Part and Parcel is the third extended play released by American post-hardcore band Make Do and Mend. The extended play was released on November 22, 2011 through Paper + Plastick records. The EP focuses on "stripped down" acoustic songs, including three acoustic versions of songs from their debut album 'End Measured Mile', two original songs and a cover of Touché Amoré. The record was engineered and produced by Greg Thomas at Silver Bullet Studios in Burlington, Connecticut.

== Background ==
James Carroll, Make Do and Mend's lead vocalist has stated that the extended play was something they've "talked about doing for a while." Its creation was rooted in the encouragement from fans and close friends to do acoustic versions of their songs and it became an opportunity for the band to "explore the versatility of [Make Do and Mend's] songs and also explore our boundaries as songwriters." The band also wished to add a cover onto the record, but were split between picking an iconic band or doing something different with a modern song. They then decided to cover Touché Amoré believing the choice might "throw people off". The release acted as a learning experience for the band as they were writing their second album Everything You Ever Loved. Vocalist James Carroll said that the band learned that "we're able to incorporate a little more dynamic into our songs, and that it doesn't have to be loud, hard and fast at all times."

== Release ==
Despite initially being planned to be released for November 21, 2011 it was instead released the next day on November 22. To accompany the release of both physical and digital copies of the extended play the band uploaded the entire EP onto their Facebook profile for streaming. The physical release of the EP came in both Compact Disc form and 12” vinyl. The vinyl release came in two variations; with a limited to 100 copies colour combination of yellow with black haze and the commonly distributed version transparent blue with white haze.

== Reception ==
Professional ratings
Review scores
Source	Rating
Alter The Press!	4/5 stars
Dead Press	9/10 stars
Ourzone Magazine	(9/10)
Punktastic	4/5 stars
Rock Sound	(8/10)

The album gained little attention from mainstream critics but received generally favourable reviews from others. Nick Robbins of Alter The Press gave the album a four stars out of five rating, praising the album for its stripped down reconstruction of tracks from their debut album, End Measured Mile describing them as "almost different songs that evoke completely different moods. In fact, there's a pleasure in playing the acoustic and full-blooded versions side-by-side, to see how two seemingly identical songs can be constructed so differently." Luke Davis of Dead Press gave the album nine out of ten stars spoke about the extended plays soft and melodic songs and in summary calling the ep "outstanding". Rob Watson-Lang when writing for Ourzone Magazine credetied the band for the folk-rock influences shown on the two new songs. Chris Marshman of Punktastic expressed concern for the band doing an extended play of acoustic songs, saying: "a band known for their heavier sound, an entirely acoustic EP was always going to a risky move." He did however give the album a four out of five star rating saying it "delivers on a big scale, proving that Make Do and Mend are far from a one trick pony, and also potentially on the verge of something great."

== Track listing ==
No.	Title	Length
1.	"Unknowingly Strong"	3:22
2.	"Ghostal"	3:06
3.	"Home Away From Here" (Touché Amoré cover)	3:42
4.	"Transparent Seas"	3:55
5.	"Coats"	2:44
6.	"Untitled"	4:22
