= Burnt Sugar (album) =

Studio album by Gouge Away
- Released: September 28, 2018
- Recorded: April 2018
- Studio: The Atomic Garden (East Palo Alto, California)
- Genre: Hardcore punk, post-hardcore
- Length: 26:13
- Label: Deathwish (DW207)
- Producer: Jack Shirley, Jeremy Bolm

Gouge Away chronology
, Dies (2016)	Burnt Sugar (2018)	Deep Sage (2024)

Burnt Sugar is the second studio album by the American rock band Gouge Away. The album was released on September 28, 2018 through Deathwish Inc. Burnt Sugar was co-produced by Jeremy Bolm of Touché Amoré and Jack Shirley (Deafheaven, Super Unison, Loma Prieta), and was recorded live to 2" analog recording tape at Shirley's Atomic Garden studio in April 2018. Gouge Away promoted the album with music videos for the tracks "Only Friend", "Ghost" and "Hey Mercy".

== Promotion ==
Gouge Away formally announced Burnt Sugar in July 2018, two months before the scheduled release date. Leading up to the release of Burnt Sugar, Gouge Away released three music videos. The first, for "Only Friend", depicts a man running through the band's hometown of Fort Lauderdale being chased by an "unseen force". The entire music video for the second promotional track "Ghost" shows a close-up of a dancing ballerina music box. Released the same week as the album's official release, the final promotional video for the track "Hey Mercy" features up-close and out-of-focus grey scale shots of Gouge Away performing in a garage.

To support the album, Gouge Away toured the US and Europe with Culture Abuse from September to October 2018, followed by a leg with Drug Church in the US from November to December 2018. In February 2019, Gouge Away will tour the US with Russian Circles.

== Reception ==
The album was generally well received by music critics, with many praising Christina Michelle's vocals and lyrics, the sonic evolution from their debut album and the production work from Bolm and Shirley. Writing for Bandcamp's blog Bandcamp Daily, Michael Siebert wrote: "Jeremy Bolm's production and Jack Shirley's mixing and mastering allow each instrument to be as loud as it wants to be. This results in a claustrophobic and immediate listen, with each lurching bassline and glassy guitar lead demanding equal attention." Tom Breihan of Stereogum wrote: "Michelle's voice is a strained howl, and her lyrics are heavy but considered lines, many of them about depression or anxiety" and that "she sings about things that I don’t hear addressed in song often, like the weight of social expectation." Writing for BrooklynVegan, Andrew Sacher says: "The new album's got a handful of punk rippers that pick right up where Gouge Away's debut left off, and leading the way is still Christina Michelle's scream, which sounds as throat-shredding as ever. But Burnt Sugar is not just a repeat of their debut; far from it. A good chunk of songs on this album take Gouge Away's sound into new territory." Critics often compared elements of Burnt Sugar to other music artists, including: The Jesus Lizard, The Pixies, Fugazi, Superchunk, Girls Against Boys, Slint, and Sonic Youth among others.

The A.V. Club included Burnt Sugar on its "Best Punk and Hardcore Albums of 2018" list and ranked at number 9 on Revolver's "30 Best Albums of 2018" list.

== Track listing ==
1. "Only Friend" – 1:48
2. "Fed Up" – 1:48
3. "Slow Drown" – 1:49
4. "Hey Mercy" – 1:47
5. "Subtle Thrill" – 2:18
6. "Ghost" – 3:33
7. "Dissociation" – 2:19
8. "Can't Relate" – 1:15
9. "Stray/Burnt Sugar" – 3:14
10. "Wilt (I Won't)" – 1:46
11. "Raw Blood" – 4:36

== Personnel ==
Burnt Sugar personnel adapted from CD liner notes.

=== Gouge Away ===
- Tommy Cantwell – drums, percussion
- Mick Ford – guitar, piano, organ
- Tyler Forsythe – bass
- Christina Michelle – vocals

=== Production and artwork ===
- Jeremy Bolm – production
- Jack Shirley – production, tracking, mixing, mastering
- Kat Lyons – illustrations
- Richard Vergez – layout
