= Waiting for Love =

Waiting for Love may refer to:

- "Waiting for Love" (Alias song), 1991
- "Waiting for Love" (Avicii song), 2015
- Waiting for Love (film), a 1981 Soviet romantic comedy directed by Pyotr Todorovsky
- Waiting for Love, a 2009 album by JJ Lin
- Waiting for Love, a 1999 album by Shujaat Khan
- "Waiting for Love", a 1986 song by Great White from Shot in the Dark
- "Waiting for Love", a 1986 single by Pete Shelley
- "Waiting for Love", a 1992 song by David Benoit from Letter to Evan
- "Waiting for Love", a 1997 song by Nanci Griffith from Blue Roses from the Moons
- "Waiting for Love", a 2003 song by P!nk from the album Try This
- "Waiting for Love", a 2012 song by Medina from Forever

== See also ==
- Wait for Love (disambiguation)
- Waiting for Your Love (disambiguation)
