= Deep Sage =

Studio album by Gouge Away
- Released: March 15, 2024
- Studio: The Atomic Garden Recording Studio, East Palo Alto, California, US
- Genre: Hardcore punk, post-hardcore, shoegaze
- Length: 34:30
- Language: English
- Label: Deathwish Inc.
- Producer: Jack Shirley

Gouge Away chronology
Burnt Sugar (2018)	Deep Sage (2024)

Deep sage refers to the unknown, I guess the future. I wrote these lyrics the first week that I moved to Portland. It was 2021 and everything was so confusing—the world news is so devastating and scary and upsetting. The future of our world and the climate is so scary, and everything is always overwhelming. I feel like I carry that with me everywhere and it's so heavy. The first week of moving to Portland, I went to this secret beach that no one was at and I was just like, this place is so beautiful. The world is actually so gorgeous. Why can't we just enjoy it? Why are there so many things in the way of that? It's a song about going back and forth between really wanting to enjoy the world for all the beauty that's there, but being constantly distracted by all of the problems.

—Gouge Away vocalist Christina Michelle on the meaning of "deep sage"

Deep Sage is a 2024 studio album by American punk rock band Gouge Away. It has received positive reviews from critics.

== Reception ==
Joshua Kahn of Clash Music scored this release an 8 out of 10, stating that "Deep Sage is more stylistically varied than [2018 album] Burnt Sugar but it never decays" and as "an exercise in sonic pleasures", "it is violent, gorgeous, and unafraid" and belongs "in a pocket somewhere next to your heart". Editors at Pitchfork scored this release 7.5 out of 10 and critic Colin Joyce characterized the approach as the band "fuses urgent post-hardcore with softer strains of shoegaze and grunge to unlock a new power of restraint" to "pursue new directions primarily in service of increasing their overall intensity". Deep Sage scored a 9 out of 10 from PopMatters' Brian Stout who called it the band's best and "an early contender for the best hardcore record of 2024" with "heavy hooks that recall 1990s alternative greats" and lyrics that are "more introspective, resulting from self-care and self-reflection". Steve Erickson of Slant Magazine found the lyrics to be the weakest part of the album along with the production by Jack Shirley, but the instrumentation displays strong arrangements "with curlicue guitar riffs and vocal fluctuations intended to disrupt a song's mood", resulting in 3 out of 5 stars. This appeared on Stereogum's mid-year list of the best albums at second place, where Danielle Chelosky called it "one of the best hardcore albums in recent memory" with "a riveting balance of macabre and rambunctious, standing as a perfect portrait of malaise".

== Track listing ==
All songs written by Tommy Cantwell, Dylan Downey, Mick Ford, Tyler Forsythe, and Christina Michelle

1. "Stuck in a Dream" – 2:40
2. "Maybe Blue" – 3:14
3. "Idealized" – 3:41
4. "Deep Sage" – 2:54
5. "A Welcome Change" – 3:34
6. "Overwatering" – 2:12
7. "No Release" – 1:48
8. "The Sharpening" – 2:57
9. "Spaced Out" – 1:44
10. "Newtau" – 3:44
11. "Dallas" – 6:02

== Personnel ==
Gouge Away

- Tommy Cantwell – drums, maracas, tambourine, percussion, arrangement, photography
- Dylan Downey – guitar, arrangement
- Mick Ford – guitar, arrangement
- Tyler Forsythe – bass guitar, arrangement
- Christina Michelle – vocals, arrangement, artwork, layout

Additional personnel

- Brian Butler – artwork
- Haley Butters – backing vocals on "Spaced Out"
- Meghan O'Neil – backing vocals on "Spaced Out"
- Jack Shirley – tracking, mixing, production, audio mastering
- Jasmine Watson – backing vocals on "Spaced Out"

== See also ==
- 2024 in American music
- 2024 in rock music
- List of 2024 albums
