= ...To the Beat of a Dead Horse =

Studio album by Touché Amoré
- Released: August 4, 2009
- Genre: Post-hardcore; melodic hardcore; screamo
- Length: 18:26
- Label: 6131
- Producer: Alex Estrada

Touché Amoré chronology
Touché Amoré (2008)	...To the Beat of a Dead Horse (2009)	Searching for a Pulse/The Worth of the World (2010)

Professional ratings
Review scores
Source	Rating
Punknews.org	4/5 stars
Rock Sound	9/10

...To the Beat of a Dead Horse is the debut studio album by American post-hardcore band Touché Amoré, released on August 4, 2009, through 6131 Records. It was produced by Alex Estrada, while the album artwork was created by guitarist Nick Steinhardt. The album features guest appearances from Thursday vocalist Geoff Rickly and Modern Life is War vocalist Jeff Eaton. The songs "Broken Records" and "Honest Sleep" were rerecorded from the band's self-titled demo that was released in 2008.

To celebrate the tenth anniversary of the album, the band re-recorded it in its entirety and released it on August 9, 2019 under the name of Dead Horse X.

== Track listing ==
No.	Title	Length
1.	"And Now It's Happening in Mine"	1:37
2.	"Honest Sleep"	2:33
3.	"Cadence"	1:47
4.	"Throwing Copper"	2:21
5.	"Swimming with Sharks"	1:03
6.	"History Reshits Itself"	1:33
7.	"Suckerfish"	1:38
8.	"Broken Records"	1:34
9.	"Nine"	0:44
10.	"Always Running, Never Looking Back"	2:11
11.	"Adieux"	1:25

== Personnel ==
...To the Beat of a Dead Horse personnel adapted from CD liner notes.

Touché Amoré

- Elliot Babin – drums
- Jeremy Bolm – vocals
- Nick Steinhardt – bass
- Clayton Stevens – guitar
- Tyson White – guitar

Additional musicians

- Jeff Eaton (Modern Life Is War) – guest vocals on "Always Running, Never Looking Back"
- Geoff Rickly (Thursday) – guest vocals on "History Reshits Itself"

Production

- Alex Estrada – engineering
- Paul Miner – mastering
- Jeremy Zsupnik – drum tracking

Artwork

- Nick Steinhardt – design, illustration
