= Stage Four =

Studio album by Touché Amoré
- Released: September 16, 2016
- Genre: Post-hardcore; melodic hardcore; screamo
- Length: 32:27
- Label: Epitaph
- Producer: Brad Wood

Touché Amoré chronology
Is Survived By (2013)	Stage Four (2016)	Lament (2020)

Singles from Stage Four
- 1. "Palm Dreams" Released: June 20, 2016; 2. "Displacement" Released: July 18, 2016; 3. "Skyscraper" Released: August 23, 2016; 4. "Rapture" Released: September 13, 2016

Stage Four is the fourth studio album by the American post-hardcore band Touché Amoré. The album was released in the United States and Europe on September 24, 2016, by Epitaph Records. The album's title is in reference to it being the band's fourth album, and due to the central inspiration for most of the album's lyrics being singer Jeremy Bolm's mother, who died of cancer.

== Critical reception ==
Professional ratings
Aggregate scores
Source	Rating
AnyDecentMusic?	7.9/10
Metacritic	84/100
Review scores
Source	Rating
AllMusic	4/5 stars
Alternative Press	4/5 stars
The A.V. Club	A−
Consequence of Sound	B−
Exclaim!	9/10
Kerrang!	4/5
Metal Hammer	4/5 stars
Pitchfork	8.1/10
Revolver	4/5 stars
Rock Sound	8/10

On its release, Stage Four received favorable reviews from music critics. At Metacritic, which assigns a normalized rating out of 100 to reviews from mainstream publications, the album received an average score of 84, based on 13 reviews. The aggregator AnyDecentMusic? gave it 7.9 out of 10, based on their assessment of the critical consensus.

In a positive review for AllMusic, James Christopher Monger remarked that Stage Four "delivers a near constant barrage of gut punches, both sonic and lyrical, but tempers the fallout with a healthy dose of empathy". At Drowned in Sound, Adam Turner-Heffer wrote, "Stage Four is quite possibly Touché Amoré’s best album yet. They have once again one–upped themselves into crafting a fierce record which would do all their families proud." Adam Feibel also praised the record in a review for Exclaim!: "The album is a passionately written and deeply moving meditation on loss, and Touché Amoré have never been better as a band."

Writing for Metal Hammer, Stephen Hill highlighted Bolm's vocals, writing, "His pain and anger are all too real and evident, and his band deserve credit for channelling his words and turning them into a musical canvas.". At Pitchfork, Zoe Camp focused on the band's sound, writing that the album's "vivid imagery, anthemic arrangements, and unsuspecting listenability position it as hardcore's Carrie & Lowell: an autobiographical tragedy that soars in spite of an overwhelming urge to succumb". Reviewing the album for Rock Sound, Gareth Pierce called it "intimate, impressive, and ultimately cathartic", while The A.V. Club's Kevin Warwick deemed it "a monumental record of melodic hardcore".

== Track listing ==
No.	Title	Length
1.	"Flowers and You"	3:34
2.	"New Halloween"	3:27
3.	"Rapture"	3:11
4.	"Displacement"	2:11
5.	"Benediction"	3:39
6.	"Eight Seconds"	1:32
7.	"Palm Dreams"	2:26
8.	"Softer Spoken"	1:55
9.	"Posing Holy"	2:47
10.	"Water Damage"	3:52
11.	"Skyscraper" (featuring Julien Baker)	3:53
12.	"Gather" (bonus track)	2:34
Total length:		35:01

== Personnel ==
Stage Four personnel adapted from AllMusic.

Touché Amoré

- Elliot Babin – drums, piano
- Jeremy Bolm – vocals
- Tyler Kirby – bass guitar, vocals
- Nick Steinhardt – guitar
- Clayton Stevens – guitar

Guest musicians

- Julien Baker – additional vocals on "Skyscraper"

Production

- Brad Wood – production, engineering, mixing
- Emily Lazar – mastering
- Chris Allgood – assistant engineer

== Charts ==
Chart (2016)	Peak position
US Billboard 200	168
US Independent Albums (Billboard)	18
US Top Alternative Albums (Billboard)	16
US Top Hard Rock Albums (Billboard)	6
US Top Rock Albums (Billboard)	21
US Indie Store Album Sales (Billboard)	9
US Top Vinyl Albums (Billboard)	3
