= Lament (Touché Amoré album) =

Studio album by Touché Amoré
- Released: October 9, 2020
- Studios: The Bunker Studio (Brooklyn, New York); Favorite Gentlemen Studios (Alpharetta, Georgia)
- Genres: Post-hardcore; melodic hardcore; screamo
- Length: 35:56
- Label: Epitaph
- Producer: Ross Robinson

Touché Amoré chronology
Stage Four (2016)	Lament (2020)	Spiral in a Straight Line (2024)

Lament is the fifth studio album by American post-hardcore band Touché Amoré. The album was released on October 9, 2020, through Epitaph Records. Recording sessions took place at the Bunker Studio in Brooklyn featuring Andy Hull's additional vocals recorded at Favorite Gentlemen Studios in Alpharetta, Georgia. It is their first album to be produced by Ross Robinson.

On October 1, 2021, the band released Lament (Demos), an album of demos of songs that would appear on Lament, as well as an unreleased song Persist.

== Critical reception ==
Professional ratings
Aggregate scores
Source	Rating
AnyDecentMusic?	8.1/10
Metacritic	83/100
Review scores
Source	Rating
Beats Per Minute	76%
DIY	4.5/5 stars
Exclaim!	8/10
Gigwise	8/10 stars
God Is in the TV	6/10
Kerrang!	4/5
NME	4/5 stars
Pitchfork	8.2/10
PopMatters	7/10
The Line of Best Fit	8.5/10

Lament was met with universal acclaim from music critics. At Metacritic, which assigns a normalized rating out of 100 to reviews from mainstream publications, the album received an average score of 83 based on nine reviews. The aggregator AnyDecentMusic? has the critical consensus of the album at an 8.1 out of 10, based on fourteen reviews. The aggregator Album of the Year assessed the critical consensus as 78 out of 100, based on fifteen reviews.

=== Accolades ===
Accolades for Lament
Publication	Accolade	Rank	Ref.
Metal Hammer	The 50 Best Metal Albums of 2020	21	
Stereogum	The 50 Best Albums of 2020	8	

== Track listing ==
All tracks are written by Jeremy Bolm, Clayton Stevens, Nick Steinhardt, Elliot Babin and Tyler Kirby, except for track 5 (written with Andy Hull).

No.	Title	Length
1.	"Come Heroine"	2:50
2.	"Lament"	3:21
3.	"Feign"	2:48
4.	"Reminders"	3:03
5.	"Limelight" (featuring Manchester Orchestra)	5:03
6.	"Exit Row"	2:17
7.	"Savoring"	2:56
8.	"A Broadcast"	3:02
9.	"I'll Be Your Host"	3:27
10.	"Deflector"	3:31
11.	"A Forecast"	3:38
Total length:		35:56

== Personnel ==
Touché Amoré

- Jeremy Bolm – vocals
- Clayton Stevens – electric guitar, acoustic guitar, 12-string guitar
- Nick Steinhardt – electric guitar, pedal steel guitar, lap steel guitar, 12-string acoustic guitar, art direction, design
- Elliot Babin – drums, keyboards, piano
- Tyler Kirby – bass, additional guitar

Guest musicians

- Justice Tripp – backing vocals (track 1)
- Julien Baker – backing vocals (track 4)
- John Andrew Hull – additional vocals (track 5)
- Ross Robinson – keyboards (tracks: 2, 6, 9), producer, additional engineering
- Jason Schimmel – keyboards (tracks: 3, 7), piano (tracks: 5, 8), additional engineering

Technical

- Mike Balboa – engineering
- Steve Evetts – mixing
- Robert McDowell – additional recording (track 5)
- Alan Douches – mastering
- George L Clarke – photography

== Charts ==
Chart (2020)	Peak position
US Top Rock Albums (Billboard)	45
US Top Alternative Albums (Billboard)	21
US Top Hard Rock Albums (Billboard)	15
US Top Album Sales (Billboard)	16
US Vinyl Albums (Billboard)	5
US Independent Albums (Billboard)	48
