= Touché Amoré / The Casket Lottery =

EP (split) by Touché Amoré & The Casket Lottery
- Released: October 12, 2012
- Genre: Post-hardcore
- Length: 12:23
- Label: No Sleep (NSR081)

Touché Amoré chronology
Live on BBC Radio 1 (2012)	Touché Amoré / The Casket Lottery (2012)	Touché Amoré / Pianos Become the Teeth (2013)

The Casket Lottery chronology
Possiblies and Maybes (2003)	Touché Amoré / The Casket Lottery (2012)	Real Fear (2012)

Professional ratings
Review scores
Source	Rating
AbsolutePunk	81%
Punknews.org	5/5 stars

Touché Amoré / The Casket Lottery is a split EP between the American bands Touché Amoré and The Casket Lottery. The album was released on October 2, 2012 through No Sleep Records. Each of the bands contributed one new song and one cover song. This EP marks the first release of new material from The Casket Lottery since 2003.

== Track listing ==
Touché Amoré

1. "Whale Belly" – 1:58
2. "Unsatisfied" (originally by The Replacements) – 3:11

The Casket Lottery

1. "White Lies" – 3:04
2. "Myth" (originally by Beach House) – 4:10
