= Pianos Become the Teeth =

Musical group from Baltimore, United States

- Origin: Baltimore, Maryland, U.S.
- Genres: Emo; screamo; post-hardcore; post-rock
- Years active: 2006–present
- Labels: Epitaph, Topshelf, Doomed by Dawn, Blackjaw
- Members: Kyle Durfey; David Haik; Chad McDonald; Zac Sewell; Mike York
- Past members: Josh Regensburg; Matt Williams; Matt Gardner; Jay Kapadia

Pianos Become the Teeth are an American band from Baltimore, Maryland, formed in 2006. Their early musical style was inspired by post-rock and early screamo acts, and they were a part of the post-hardcore music movement, also represented by Touché Amoré, La Dispute, Defeater, and Make Do and Mend. The group reissued their well-received debut album Old Pride in 2010 through Topshelf Records.

== History ==
=== Early years and Old Pride (2006–2010) ===
Pianos Become The Teeth formed in late 2006 in Baltimore, Maryland. Their first release, the Saltwater EP, was released in 2008 through Doomed by Dawn Records. In early 2009 Pianos Become The Teeth released a split EP with Ezra Joyce. Their contributed track, "Creatures of Habit," was a darker song similar to the material that was recorded for their follow-up first full-length.

Pianos Become The Teeth released their debut album, Old Pride in 2009 through Blackjaw Records. They subsequently signed to Topshelf Recordings in October 2009, and reissued their debut album in January 2010 through digital media outlets and on CD. The Topshelf version of Old Pride saw a much wider release that was met with much acclaim. Andrew Kelham of Rock Sound gave the album a nine out of ten, and wrote that "With a why-just-write-a-song-when-you-can-write-an-epic attitude, the eight songs on their second record are distinguished, articulate and immersive as their juddering post-hardcore clashes with moments of Explosions in the Sky rivalling tenderness and Mogwai-esque grandeur." Writing for Alternative Press, Brian Shultz gave the album four out of five stars and said that the group has, "quietly refined their craft over the last few years into an incredibly cathartic and sporadically chilling mode. Their screamo peers--past or present--should be more than envious." In January 2010, the band went on an East Coast tour with In the Hollows. Old Pride was released on vinyl in June 2010 as a joint release through Topshelf Records and Mayfly Records. In support of the album, Pianos Become The Teeth toured the US with Touché Amoré and Lemuria.

In October 2010, Pianos Become The Teeth released a split EP with the Saddest Landscape through Just Say No! Records.

=== The Lack Long After (2011–2013) ===
In January 2011, the Pianos Become The Teeth had begun writing a new album, and described the new songs as being "darker and heavier" than previous material, and that they would not become "Old Pride part 2," alluding to new musical direction. Recording began on August 1, 2011, at Developing Nations Studio with producer Kevin Bernsten. In October and November, the group supported Title Fight on their headlining US tour. Topshelf Records released the LP The Lack Long After, a concept album about vocalist Kyle Durfey's father's death from multiple sclerosis, on November 1, 2011, with a supporting tour with Touché Amoré and Seahaven following shortly after.

=== Signing to Epitaph and Keep You (2014) ===
Pianos Become the Teeth signed with Epitaph Records in 2014; the band released their third studio album, Keep You, on October 28 of that year. The Will Yip-produced album is noted for its stylistic departure from earlier releases, featuring a less aggressive sound and no screamed vocals from Kyle Durfey. The band promoted the album with an online stream of "Repine" in August 2014.

=== Wait for Love (2018) ===
On November 8, 2017, Pianos Become the Teeth announced that their new album would release on February 16, 2018. They also released the first single and music video off the album, "Charisma".

The band subsequently released music videos for "Bitter Red" and "Love On Repeat" ahead of the album release, completing a trilogy of music videos directed by Michael Parks Randa. After the album's release, Pianos Become The Teeth announced an August 2018 UK co-headline tour with Foxing to celebrate the release and coincide with their appearance at ArcTanGent festival.

=== Drift (2022) ===
On June 8, 2022, Pianos Become the Teeth announced their fifth studio album Drift which was released on August 26, 2022, through Epitaph Records. They also released the first single and music video from the album "Genevieve."

== Musical style and lyrics ==
Pianos Become The Teeth is a prominent band in "the wave," a new generation of post-hardcore bands. Other figures in The Wave include La Dispute, Touché Amoré, Defeater and Make Do and Mend. The bands in this movement perform with "emotionally-centered lyrical content, dual musical emphasis on both melody and distorted intensity."

Musically, Pianos Become The Teeth write songs influenced by emo and screamo acts such as Who Calls So Loud and Planes Mistaken for Stars, melodic hardcore bands including Modern Life is War and Have Heart and also post-rock bands like This Will Destroy You. In an interview with Staircase Thoughts, the band described being labeled as screamo as "flattering in some respects;" ultimately, however, they did not want to be pigeonholed as a "screamo band."

Vocalist Kyle Durfey writes very personal lyrics that often discuss events in his life, or about dwelling on the future and growing up. Specifically on their album Old Pride, Durfey wrote about, "how you have this 'young fire' when you're younger and you have to have an 'old pride' to feel right about your life." The track "Cripples Can't Shiver" outlines Durfey's father, and how his struggles with multiple sclerosis impacted his life. In an interview with Hearwax, Kyle Durfey commented on writing dark lyrics, stating "I feel like most of us and most bands we are into tend to write about darker things. It's hard to write when you're happy. This doesn't mean we aren't happy as people."

== Members ==
=== Current members ===
- Kyle Durfey – lead vocals, lyrics, piano, programming
- Chad McDonald – guitars
- Mike York – guitars
  - York also produces and DJs electronic music under the name SUAHN.
- Zac Sewell – bass, backing vocals
- David Haik – drums, percussion

=== Former members ===
- Josh Regensburg – bass
- Matt Williams – keyboards, synthesizers, backing vocals
- Brian Bukszar – drums
- Matt Gardner – bass
- Jay Kapadia – guitar

== Discography ==
=== Studio albums ===
- Old Pride (2009)
- The Lack Long After (2011)
- Keep You (2014)
- Wait for Love (2018)
- Drift (2022)

=== Demos/EPs ===
- Demo (2007)
- Saltwater (2008)
- Close (2015)

=== Split EPs ===
- Pianos Become The Teeth / Ezra Joyce (2009)
- Pianos Become The Teeth / The Saddest Landscape (2010)
- Touché Amoré / Pianos Become the Teeth (2013)

=== Music videos ===
- "Houses We Die In" (2009)
- "I'll Be Damned" (2011)
- "I'll Get By" (2012)
- "Repine" (2014)
- "Late Lives" (2014)
- "895" (2015)
- "Ripple Water Shine" (2015)
- "Charisma" (2017)
- "Bitter Red" (2018)
- "Love On Repeat" (2018)
- "Genevieve" (2022)
- “Skiv” (2022)
- “Buckley” (2022)
