= Touché Amoré / Pianos Become the Teeth =

- Touché Amoré's side of the split.

EP (split) by Touché Amoré & Pianos Become the Teeth
- Released: January 8, 2013
- Genre: Screamo, post-hardcore
- Length: 9:35
- Label: Topshelf; Deathwish (DWI141)

Touché Amoré chronology
| Touché Amoré / The Casket Lottery (2012) | Touché Amoré / Pianos Become the Teeth (2013) | Touché Amoré / Title Fight (2013) |

Pianos Become the Teeth chronology
| The Lack Long After (2011) | Touché Amoré / Pianos Become the Teeth (2013) | Keep You (2014) |

Professional ratings
Review scores
| Source | Rating |
|---|---|
| AbsolutePunk | 95% |

Touché Amoré / Pianos Become the Teeth is a split EP between the American bands Touché Amoré and Pianos Become the Teeth. The EP was co-released digitally on January 8, 2013, through Topshelf Records and Deathwish Inc. A physical 7" vinyl version of the split was released on January 22, 2013.

Pianos Become the Teeth's track "Hiding" is noted for vocalist Kyle Durfey's softer, singing vocals in addition to his traditional screamed vocals. Touché Amoré's track "Gravity, Metaphorically" marked the band's first song to exceed a longer time length, clocking in at roughly four minutes. A music video for "Gravity, Metaphorically", directed by Max Moore, premiered on the day of the EP's digital release.

== Track listing ==
Touché Amoré

| No. | Title | Length |
|---|---|---|
| 1. | "Gravity, Metaphorically" | 4:07 |

Pianos Become the Teeth

| No. | Title | Length |
|---|---|---|
| 2. | "Hiding" | 5:28 |
