= Is Survived By =

Studio album by Touché Amoré
- Released: September 24, 2013
- Genres: Post-hardcore; melodic hardcore; screamo
- Length: 29:35
- Label: Deathwish
- Producer: Brad Wood

Touché Amoré chronology
Touché Amoré / Title Fight (2013)	Is Survived By (2013)	Stage Four (2016)

Singles from Is Survived By
- 1. "Just Exist" Released: July 30, 2013

Is Survived By is the third studio album by American post-hardcore band Touché Amoré. The album was released on September 24, 2013 through Deathwish. The full track listing and artwork was revealed on July 17, 2013. The album's first single, "Just Exist", was released on July 30, 2013, and a music video for the song "Harbor" was released on September 25 the same year. It was produced by Brad Wood and feature guest vocal appearances by Jon Simmons of Balance and Composure, and Julia Blake of synth-pop band Vow.

== Critical reception ==
Professional ratings
Aggregate scores
Source	Rating
Metacritic	87/100
Review scores
Source	Rating
AllMusic	3.5/5 stars
Absolute Punk	98%
Alternative Press	5/5 stars
The A.V. Club	A−
Drowned in Sound	7/10
Exclaim!	9/10
Pitchfork Media	8/10
PopMatters	8/10 stars
The Skinny	4/5 stars
Sputnikmusic	4.1/5

On its release, Is Survived By received favorable reviews from music critics, with an 87/100 from review aggregate metacritic indicating universal acclaim. Citing the album's mature and personal lyrics and vocalist Jeremy Bolm performance as the album highlights, it also received praise for the more ambitious approach to the band's songwriting, noting the expanding song lengths and musical variation as a sign of Touché Amorés growth as musicians.

Writing for Alternative Press, Scott Heisel wrote that "Is Survived By feels claustrophobic in the best way possible", and that "These breakdowns aren't musical; they're psychological.". David Anthony of the AV Club noting the band's musical evolution "Is Survived By is a transitory record for Touché Amoré, but it doesn’t suffer from this designation. As the band inches toward hardcore’s ceiling, it’s not abandoning the style. Rather, it’s merely embracing the malleable aspects"

== Track listing ==
No.	Title	Length
1.	"Just Exist"	2:17
2.	"To Write Content"	2:57
3.	"Praise / Love"	1:01
4.	"Anyone / Anything"	2:39
5.	"DNA"	2:08
6.	"Harbor"	3:04
7.	"Kerosene"	1:42
8.	"Blue Angels"	1:31
9.	"Social Caterpillar"	3:03
10.	"Non Fiction"	3:05
11.	"Steps"	2:38
12.	"Is Survived By"	3:30

== Personnel ==
Is Survived By personnel adapted from liner notes.

Touché Amoré

- Elliot Babin – drums, piano
- Jeremy Bolm – vocals
- Tyler Kirby – bass, vocals
- Nick Steinhardt – guitar
- Clayton Stevens – guitar

Guest musicians

- Julia Blake (Vow) – additional vocals on "Blue Angels"
- Jon Simmons (Balance and Composure) – additional vocals on "Steps"

Production

- Brad Wood – production, engineering, mixing
- Hans DeKline – mastering

Artwork

- Nick Steinhardt – art direction, design
- Ryan Aylsworth – photography
