= Old Pride =

Studio album by Pianos Become the Teeth
- Released: July 1, 2009
- Genre: Post-hardcore; post-rock; emo
- Length: 36:08
- Label: Blackjaw; Topshelf
- Producer: Kevin Bernsten

Pianos Become the Teeth chronology
Saltwater (2008)	Old Pride (2009)	The Lack Long After (2011)

Old Pride is the debut studio album by American rock band, Pianos Become the Teeth. The album was released on July 1, 2009 through Blackjaw Records and reissued by Topshelf Records on January 26, 2010.

== Composition and lyrics ==
Musically Old Pride is a screamo record heavily influenced by post-rock acts.

The lyrics of Old Pride are written by Kyle Durfey and seem mostly open-ended. "Cripples Can't Shiver" is a song-story about a disease-ridden family member, consisting of archival audio of an anonymous woman talking about her husband experiencing chronic aggressive multiple sclerosis.

== Critical reception ==
Professional ratings
Review scores
Source	Rating
AllMusic	4.5/5 stars
Sputnikmusic	4/5 stars

Andrew Kelham of Rock Sound gave the album a nine out of ten, writing that "With a why-just-write-a-song-when-you-can-write-an-epic attitude, the eight songs on their second record are distinguished, articulate and immersive as their juddering post-hardcore clashes with moments of Explosions in the Sky rivalling tenderness and Mogwai-esque grandeur." In its review, Alternative Press concludes "Pianos Become The Teeth's screamo peers–past or present–should be more than envious."

== Track listing ==
No.	Title	Length
1.	"Fillial"	5:15
2.	"Quit Benifit"	2:55
3.	"Sleepshaker"	3:08
4.	"Prev"	2:11
5.	"Pensive"	4:33
6.	"Cripples Can't Shiver"	6:57
7.	"Jess And Charlie"	3:17
8.	"Young Fire"	7:49
Total length:		36:08

== Personnel ==
Pianos Become the Teeth

- Kyle Durfey – vocals
- Mike York – guitar
- Chad McDonald – guitar
- Zac Sewell – bass
- David Haik – drums

Additional personnel

- Kevin Bernsten – production
- August Schwartz – artwork design and concept
- Danielle Yurchinkonis – photography
