= Gouge Away =

American hardcore punk band

- Origin: Fort Lauderdale, Florida, US
- Genres: Hardcore punk, punk rock, post-hardcore, noise rock
- Years active: 2012–present
- Labels: Deathwish, Secret Voice, Eighty-Sixed
- Members: Christina Michelle; Thomas Cantwell; Mick Ford; Tyler Forsythe; Dylan Downey
- Past members: Victor Skamiera; Kotu Bajaj; Peter Allen; Zack Rogers
- Website: gougeaway.com

Gouge Away is an American hardcore punk band based in Florida that formed in 2012. The band is influenced by post-hardcore and noise rock bands such as Pixies, The Jesus Lizard, Fugazi, Unwound, the Plot to Blow Up the Eiffel Tower and Nirvana. Gouge Away released its debut album , Dies in 2016 to underground acclaim, and released its second album Burnt Sugar through Deathwish Inc. in 2018.

== History ==
Gouge Away formed in Fort Lauderdale, Florida in 2012. The following year, the band self-released a pair of EPs (Still Bored and Focus Your Anger) and toured in support of local charities and activist groups.

The band released its debut album titled , Dies on February 13, 2016, through Eighty-Sixed Records. Jeremy Bolm of Touché Amoré personally invited Gouge Away to tour with them and Ceremony. During this time, the band also toured with G.L.O.S.S. and Paint It Black. BrooklynVegan ranked , Dies at number 17 on their "The 20 Best Emo/Punk Albums of 2016" list, while Vice magazine's music blog Noisey called it one of the "37 Best Overlooked Albums of 2016". In his write-up about Gouge Away for the article, Noisey journalist Dan Ozzi said the album, "wears its politics proudly on its sleeve, with Michelle's lyrics staunchly taking a stand against animal testing, police brutality, and social injustice. The type of hardcore that Gouge Away plays might not be en vogue these days, but it damn well should be."

In April 2017, Gouge Away released the single "Swallow" b/w "Sweat". It was released through Bolm's own Secret Voice Records, itself an imprint of Deathwish Inc. Michelle has said this was the release that helped define the band's personality. Gouge Away opened for Touché Amoré and Single Mothers for a September–October 2017 US tour.

Gouge Away announced its signing to Deathwish in March 2018. Label co-founder Tre McCarthy made the decision to sign the band after seeing them perform with Touché Amoré in Philadelphia. The band's second studio album, Burnt Sugar, was released on September 28, 2018, and was co-produced by Bolm with mixing by Jack Shirley (Deafheaven, Comadre, Punch). Michelle says they made music that was more dynamic with this release. Gouge Away began promoting Burnt Sugar with a pair of music videos for the tracks "Only Friend" and "Ghost" in August 2018. About the track "Ghost", John Hill of Revolver wrote: "It's the band's catchiest work to date, showing they have just as much of a talent for anthemic Nineties-harkening alt-rock as they do total rippers." To support the album, Gouge Away toured the US and Europe with Culture Abuse from September to October 2018, followed by a leg with Drug Church in the US from November to December 2018.

== Personnel ==
- Christina Michelle – vocals
- Thomas Cantwell – drums
- Mick Ford – guitar
- Tyler Forsythe – bass
- Dylan Downey – guitar

== Discography ==
=== Studio albums ===
- , Dies (2016, Eighty-Sixed)
- Burnt Sugar (2018, Deathwish)
- Deep Sage (2024, Deathwish)

=== EPs ===
- Still Bored (2013, self-released)
- Focus Your Anger (2013, self-released)

=== Singles ===
- "Swallow"/"Sweat" (2017, Secret Voice)
- "Consider"/"Wave of Mutilation" (2020, Deathwish)

=== Music videos ===
- "Only Friend" (2018)
- "Ghost" (2018)
- "Hey Mercy" (2018)
- "Stuck in a Dream" (2024)
- "Dallas" (2024)
- "Figurine" (2026)
