= Make Do and Mend (band) =

American post-hardcore band

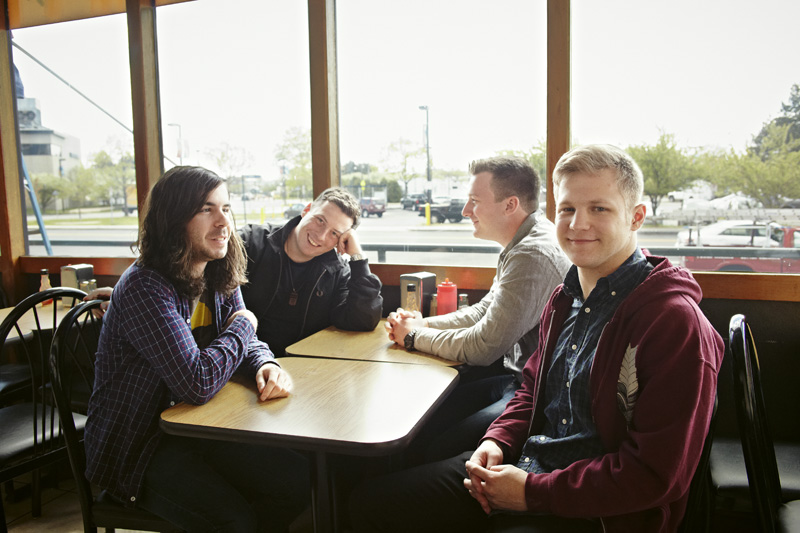

Background information
- Origin: West Hartford, Connecticut, United States
- Genres: Punk rock; post-hardcore; emo
- Years active: 2003–2016; 2026–present
- Labels: Stay Close; Rise; Panic; Paper + Plastick; Holy Roar
- Members: James Carroll; Mike O'Toole; Matt Carroll
- Past members: Luke Schwartz; Mike Poulin; Pat Kelliher; Tim Casey; Kevin Ayotte; Jack Barrett
- Website: www.makedoandmend.me

Make Do and Mend is an American post-hardcore band from West Hartford, Connecticut, that formed in 2006, who relocated to Boston. They released 2 EPs on Panic Records, a split with Touché Amoré and three full-length albums. While technically members of "the wave", along with La Dispute, Touché Amoré, Pianos Become the Teeth, and Defeater, the band has since clarified that "The Wave" was merely an inside joke between those bands and does not represent a particular movement or subgenre in post-hardcore.

== History ==
Formed in West Hartford in 2006, the band would later relocate to Boston. In 2007, they self-released their EP We're All Just Living (which was later re-released on Panic Records). This release was followed up by another EP entitled Bodies of Water, which was also released on Panic in 2009. They have cited influences including Hot Water Music, Seaweed, Jimmy Eat World, Foo Fighters and the National.

In 2010, after a year of touring with the likes of The Wonder Years, Set Your Goals, Shook Ones, Comeback Kid and Title Fight they released their debut LP, End Measured Mile, which was met with critical acclaim. The album featured guest vocals by Jordan Dreyer of fellow Wave band, La Dispute. The band later signed with Paper + Plastick to release the album on vinyl. Later in 2011, they released a split 7-inch with another fellow Wave band, Touché Amoré.

They made their first trip to Australia in September–October 2011 as part of the Soundwave Revolution Festival. They also embarked on the 'Clash Battle Guilt Pride' album release tour with Polar Bear Club, Fireworks, Balance and Composure and Such Gold.

On November 22, 2011, they released through Paper + Plastick a new EP called Part and Parcel. It includes three acoustic versions of songs from their debut album 'End Measured Mile', one original song, a song from the Mixed Signals compilation on Run For Cover Records, and a cover of Touché Amoré.

It was announced in July 2011, that UK-based independent record label, Holy Roar Records, would release Make Do and Mend's discography on a double LP. It includes the Bodies of Water and We're All Just Living EPs and End Measured Mile.

The band announced they had signed with Rise Records and were to be recording a new album in February 2012, titled "Everything You Ever Loved" with an expected release in Summer 2012. The record was recorded with Matt Bayles, who has worked with Mastodon, Minus the Bear, and Botch. In April 2012, the release was set on June 19.

In January 2012, Luke Schwartz joined the band replacing Mike Poulin on bass.

In June 2012, the band released their new album, Everything You Ever Loved on Rise Records to critical acclaim The band entered a hiatus in mid-2013, only playing a select amount of shows.

The band's final studio album, Don't Be Long, was released on February 24, 2015.

The band announced a reunion and a new album titled On Going on March 8th, 2026.

== Members ==
Final lineup

- James Carroll – lead vocals, rhythm guitar
- Mike O'Toole – lead guitar
- Luke Schwartz – bass guitar, backing vocals
- Matt Carroll – drums

Former members

- Mike Poulin – bass guitar
- Pat Kelliher – bass guitar
- Tim Casey – bass guitar
- Kevin Ayotte – bass guitar
- Jack Barrett – guitar

== Discography ==
=== Studio albums ===
- End Measured Mile (Paper + Plastick, Panic Records, 2010)
- Everything You Ever Loved (Rise Records, 2012)
- Don't Be Long (Rise, 2015)
- On Going (2026)

=== EPs ===
- "Intensity in Ten Cities" (self-released, 2006)
- We're All Just Living (self-released, Panic, 2007)
- Bodies of Water (Panic, 2009)
- Part and Parcel (Paper + Plastick, 2011)

=== Splits ===
- Make Do and Mend/Touché Amoré Split (Panic, 2010)
- Make Do and Mend/The Flatliners Split (Rise, 2013)

=== Music videos ===
- "Bitter Work" (2008)
- "Oak Square" (2010)
- "Transparent Seas" (2011)
- "Unknowingly Strong" [Acoustic] (2012)
- "Lucky" (2012)
- "Disassemble" (2012)

=== Compilations ===
- Carry The Torch: A Tribute to Kid Dynamite (Get Outta Town Records, 2009)
- Vans Warped Tour 2012 Compilation (SideOneDummy Records, 2012)
