= Spiral in a Straight Line =

Studio album by Touché Amoré
- Released: October 11, 2024
- Studio: The Peaky Barnacle (Los Angeles)
- Genres: Post-hardcore; melodic hardcore; screamo; emo; indie rock
- Length: 31:49
- Label: Rise
- Producer: Ross Robinson

Touché Amoré chronology
Lament (2020)	Spiral in a Straight Line (2024)

Spiral in a Straight Line is the sixth studio album by American post-hardcore band Touché Amoré. It was released on October 11, 2024, through Rise Records. Production was handled by Ross Robinson. It features guest appearances from Julien Baker and Lou Barlow.

== Critical reception ==
Professional ratings
Aggregate scores
Source	Rating
Metacritic	79/100
Review scores
Source	Rating
DIY	4.5/5 stars
Dork	5/5 stars
Exclaim!	7/10
God Is in the TV	9/10
Kerrang!	3/5
laut.de	4/5 stars
Metal Hammer	4/5 stars
Pitchfork	7.9/10
Sputnikmusic	3.8/5
The Line of Best Fit	8/10

Spiral in a Straight Line was met with generally favorable reviews from music critics. At Metacritic, which assigns a normalized rating out of 100 to reviews from mainstream publications, the album received an average score of 79 based on seven reviews.

Ben Tipple of DIY praised the album, stating: "the shifts are subtle but notable, providing another brilliant backdrop for Jeremy's largely pained candour". Will Yarbrough of The Line of Best Fit resumed: "it's not their best album, but by sticking closely to this pattern, Spiral in a Straight Line is their most cohesive". Ellie Kovach of Pitchfork wrote: "the band has lost none of the adventurousness of Lament, but the songs are more direct and immediate, weaponizing Bolm's hoarse roar in service of the strongest and most surprising hooks of their career to date". Sputnikmusic staff member found "Spiral in a Straight Line strives to strike a balance. It's a collection of great songs, varies in pace, and is recognisably Touché". Paul Dika of Exclaim! wrote: "Spiral in a Straight Line is an album that represents the logical next step for a band who have honed in on what works — not reinventing the wheel but finding subtle ways to improve on what Touché Amoré is and what they can be".

In a mixed review, Mischa Pearlman of Kerrang! stated: "there are a couple of marvellous moments – namely the shapeshifting "Mezzanine" and the agonising regret of "Finalist" – but often Spiral In A Straight Line settles into itself too much".

== Track listing ==
All tracks are written by Touché Amoré; "Altitude" written with Ioanna Gika, "Subversion (Brand New Love)" written with Lou Barlow, and "Goodbye for Now" written with Julien Baker.

No.	Title	Length
1.	"Nobody's"	2:15
2.	"Disasters"	2:53
3.	"Hal Ashby"	2:55
4.	"Force of Habit"	2:55
5.	"Mezzanine"	2:07
6.	"Altitude"	3:26
7.	"This Routine"	2:35
8.	"Finalist"	2:13
9.	"Subversion (Brand New Love)" (featuring Lou Barlow)	3:17
10.	"The Glue"	2:53
11.	"Goodbye for Now" (featuring Julien Baker)	4:20
Total length:		31:49

== Personnel ==
Touché Amoré

- Jeremy Bolm – vocals
- Clayton Stevens – guitars, keyboards
- Nick Steinhardt – guitars, pedal steel, art direction, design
- Elliot Babin – drums
- Tyler Kirby – bass

Additional contributors

- Ross Robinson – production, additional engineering
- Alan Douches – mastering
- Steve Evetts – mixing
- Mike Balboa – engineering
- Matt DeLisi – cover art
- Sean F. Stout – principal photography
- Jordan Divers – design

== Charts ==
Chart (2024)	Peak position
UK Album Downloads (Official Charts)	58
UK Rock & Metal Albums (Official Charts)	22
