= Parting the Sea Between Brightness and Me =

Studio album by Touché Amoré
- Released: June 7, 2011
- Recorded: February 2011 at Black Lodge Recording in Eudora, Kansas
- Genres: Post-hardcore; melodic hardcore; screamo
- Length: 20:47
- Label: Deathwish
- Producer: Ed Rose

Touché Amoré chronology
Searching for a Pulse/The Worth of the World (2010)	Parting the Sea Between Brightness and Me (2011)	Live on BBC Radio 1 (2012)

Professional ratings
Aggregate scores
Source	Rating
Metacritic	(81/100)
Review scores
Source	Rating
Alternative Press	4.5/5 stars
Drowned In Sound	(8/10)
Rock Sound	(9/10)
Sputnikmusic	(3.5/5)

Parting the Sea Between Brightness and Me is the second studio album by the American post-hardcore band Touché Amoré. The album was released on June 7, 2011, through Deathwish Inc. It was recorded and produced in five days with Ed Rose at his own Black Lodge Recording studio in Eudora, Kansas. The band was recorded live to give the album a more "honest/raw" feel. The band said they chose to work with Rose because of the work he had done with The Casket Lottery.

To promote Parting the Sea Between Brightness and Me, Touché Amoré released one part of the album cover per week through the guitarist Nick Steinhardt's blog. The group also made "Amends", "Home Away from Here" and "~" available for online streaming before the official release of the album. On its release, the album received generally positive reviews from music critics. At Metacritic, which assigns a normalized rating out of 100 to reviews from mainstream critics, the album received an average score of 81, based on 7 reviews, which indicates "universal acclaim".

== Track listing ==
No.	Title	Length
1.	"~"	1:29
2.	"Pathfinder"	1:06
3.	"The Great Repetition"	1:48
4.	"Art Official"	1:38
5.	"Uppers/Downers"	1:06
6.	"Crutch"	1:11
7.	"Method Act"	1:53
8.	"Face Ghost"	2:20
9.	"Sesame"	1:06
10.	"Wants/Needs"	1:49
11.	"Condolences"	1:47
12.	"Home Away from Here"	1:50
13.	"Amends"	1:44

== Personnel ==
Parting the Sea Between Brightness and Me personnel adapted from CD liner notes.

Touché Amoré

- Elliot Babin – drums, piano
- Jeremy Bolm – vocals, lyrics
- Tyler Kirby – bass guitar, backing vocals
- Nick Steinhardt – guitar
- Clayton Stevens – guitar

Production

- Ed Rose – production, engineering, mixing
- Carl Saff – mastering

Artwork

- Ryan Aylsworth – photography
- Nick Steinhardt – art direction, design
