= Wait for Love (album) =

Studio album by Pianos Become the Teeth
- Released: February 16, 2018
- Genres: Post-hardcore; post-rock; emo
- Length: 46:11
- Label: Epitaph
- Producer: Will Yip

Pianos Become the Teeth chronology
Keep You (2014)	Wait for Love (2018)	Drift (2022)

Wait for Love is the fourth studio album by American rock band Pianos Become the Teeth. The album was released on February 16, 2018, through Epitaph Records.

== Critical reception ==
Professional ratings
Aggregate scores
Source	Rating
Metacritic	75/100
Review scores
Source	Rating
AllMusic	3/5 stars
Kerrang!	3/5 stars
Magnet	4.5/5 stars
Pitchfork	7.7/10
The Line of Best Fit	6.5/10

Wait for Love has received generally positive reviews from music critics. At review aggregator site Metacritic, which assigns a normalized rating out of 100 to reviews from critics, the album received a score of 75 out of 100, indicating "generally favorable reviews based on seven critics."

== Track listing ==
No.	Title	Length
1.	"Fake Lighting"	4:24
2.	"Charisma"	4:08
3.	"Bitter Red"	4:43
4.	"Dry Spells"	5:35
5.	"Bay of Dreams"	4:21
6.	"Forever Sound"	4:00
7.	"Bloody Sweet"	5:04
8.	"Manilla"	4:11
9.	"Love on Repeat"	4:18
10.	"Blue"	5:31
Total length:		46:11
