= Jeremy Bolm =

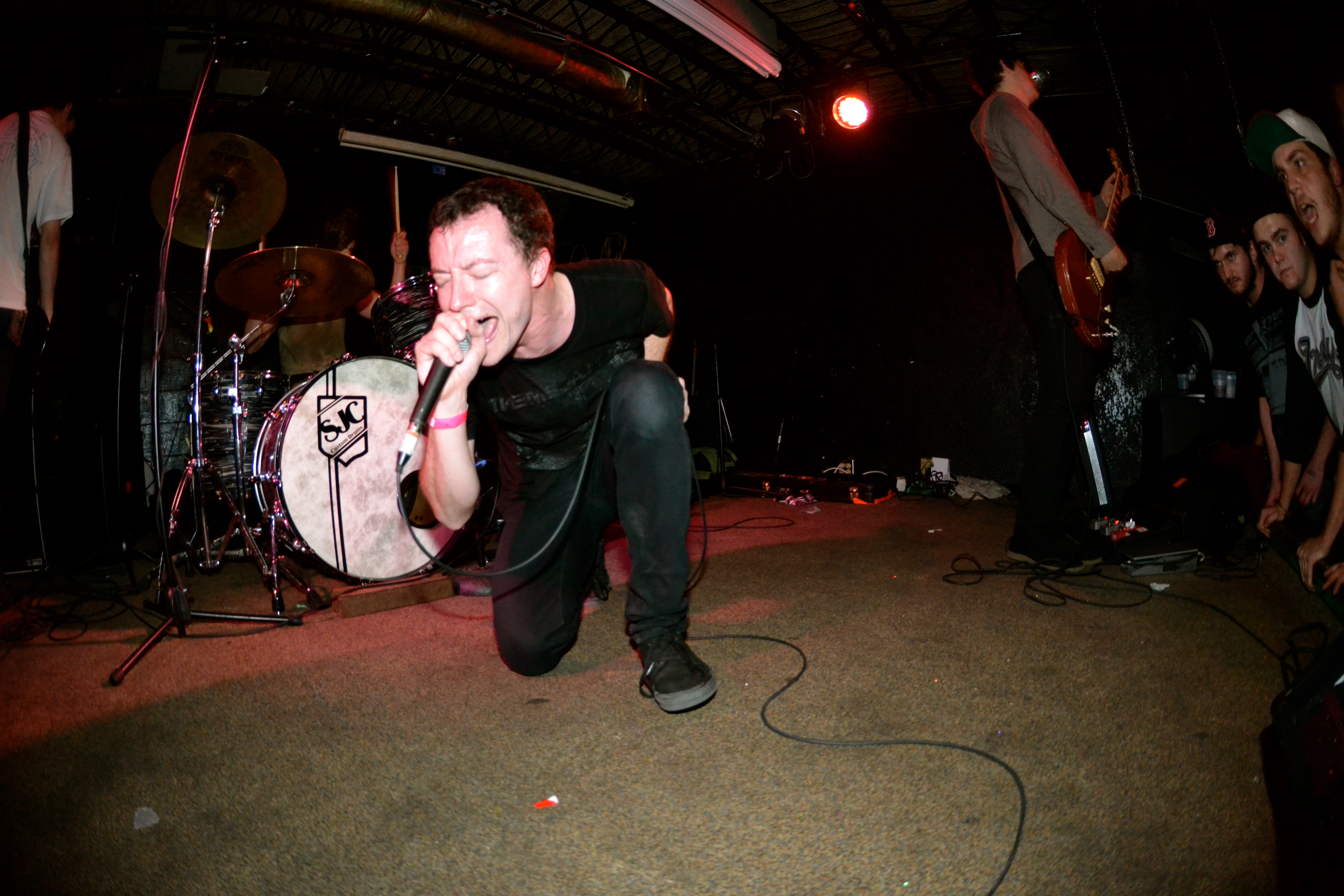
- Jeremy Bolm performing live with Touché Amoré in 2012.

Background information
- Born: April 6, 1983 (age 43)
- Origin: Los Angeles, California
- Genres: Post-hardcore, melodic hardcore, hardcore punk
- Occupations: Musician, writer, music producer, record label owner
- Instruments: Vocals, guitar
- Years active: 2006–present
- Labels: Epitaph, Deathwish, Secret Voice, 6131

Jeremy X. Bolm is an American vocalist, record label owner, music producer and writer. In his music career, he is most known for being the full-time vocalist of the post-hardcore band Touché Amoré. He has also performed with the part-time bands Thriller, Deadhead and Hesitation Wounds. Outside of performing, Bolm runs the indie record label Secret Voice and self-publishes his own poetry zines.

== Personal life ==
Before deciding to be a member of Touché Amoré full-time, Bolm worked various jobs in the music and entertainment industry. He worked at a local record store and did freelance work for multiple publications including LA Weekly. At Visual Data, he was the head of the shipping and receiving department, in which he was responsible for delivering episodes of The Bernie Mac Show and Malcolm in the Middle to Fox Broadcasting Company. His final full-time job was working for the film and media distribution company Revolt.

Bolm adheres to a straight edge lifestyle, which he was inspired to adopt after discovering and learning about the straight edge band Earth Crisis through a 1996 Ozzfest VHS compilation.

Bolm has a functional voice disorder known as puberphonia, which contributes to the raspy, breathy quality and relatively low volume of his speaking voice. Despite this, he is capable of speaking in a much deeper bass vocal register, which he has referred to as his “secret voice”.

== Music career ==
Jeremy Bolm began playing music when he was in middle school, initially as a guitarist.

His first band Thriller formed while he was in high school, which created music that he compared to Every Time I Die and The Bronx. He described Thriller as a "bootcamp band" where he "learned everything to do and not to do" when being a part of a band.

Bolm's primary and longest-running band is Touché Amoré. He has also been a member of Deadhead and the supergroup Hesitation Wounds.

With Gouge Away's 2018 album Burnt Sugar, Bolm produced his first record in collaboration with Jack Shirley.

== Musical influences ==
Jeremy Bolm described himself as being a "metalhead" (or a fan of metal) throughout middle school and most of high school. The first live concert Bolm ever saw was David Bowie with Nine Inch Nails in 1995. Growing up in California in the 1990s, he saw local nu metal bands such as Linkin Park, Papa Roach, System of a Down and Static-X perform live before the genre saw mainstream success.

His interest in hardcore music grew after discovering Victory Records in the 1990s. Early Victory artists he recalls enjoying include Inner Strength, Earth Crisis, Snapcase, Bloodlet, Deadguy and Strife.

== Other endeavors ==
=== Secret Voice ===
In 2012, Jeremy Bolm launched his own independent record label titled Secret Voice. The label is an imprint under Jacob Bannon of Converge's own label, Deathwish Inc. Secret Voice's debut release was the self-titled 7-inch EP by the Canadian punk band Single Mothers. The name of the label is a reference to Bolm’s “secret voice,” a deeper vocal register he has said he is capable of using but does not normally speak in.

=== Zines ===
Between recording Touché Amoré's third album Is Survived By and waiting for its release later in 2013, Bolm was looking for ways to fill his time. He had always wanted his label Secret Voice to release things other than music, and decided to test that idea out with a personal zine. That year, he released Down Time which included tour stories, poems, advice for hosting basement shows and a transcript of his first interview ever with Jacob Bannon in 2004. The first edition of 500 copies sold out in 12 hours.

In 2018, Bolm released two more zines. For Words From a Porch he compiled various writings between 2016 and 2018, while for October he compiled 31 daily poems he wrote in October 2018.

=== Podcasting ===
In 2020, Bolm launched The First Ever Podcast. Each week, Bolm discusses a series of firsts with his guest – be they a musician, a cartoonist, a photographer, a comic book creator or some other type of creative. Guests so far have included Reba Meyers of Code Orange, The New Yorker cartoonist Madeleine Horvath and record producer Will Yip.

=== Acting ===
Bolm played the role of Jeremy Barf, guitarist of a fictional punk rock band, in the 2022 biographical parody film Weird: The Al Yankovic Story. Other members of the fictional band are bassist and singer Johnny Barf, played by Johnny Pemberton, and drummer Jonah Barf, played by Jonah Ray.

== Discography ==
=== Thriller ===
- Hamburger Safari EP (2006)
- Thriller EP (2007)

=== Touché Amoré ===
- ...To the Beat of a Dead Horse (2009)
- Parting the Sea Between Brightness and Me (2011)
- Is Survived By (2013)
- Stage Four (2016)
- Lament (2020)
- Spiral in a Straight Line (2024)

=== Deadhead ===
- A State of Punk EP (2009)
- Deadhead EP (2010)
- Cathedrals / Deadhead split EP (2010)

=== Hesitation Wounds ===
- Hesitation Wounds EP (2013)
- Awake for Everything (2016)
- Chicanery (2019)

=== As guest ===
Year	Artist	Album	Track
2010	Loma Prieta	Life/Less	
2011	O'Brother	Garden Window	"Cleanse Me"
2012	Drug Church	Drug Church	"Mohawk"
2012	Circa Survive	Violent Waves – Live at the Shrine (bonus DVD)	"Glass Arrows" (live)
2014	Say Anything	Hebrews	"Lost My Touch"
2019	Swain	Negative Space	"Same Things"
2025	Boneflower	Reveries	"Pomegranate"
2026	Light Once Lost	What Doesn't Steal You	"Exit Clause"

=== As producer ===
- Gouge Away – Burnt Sugar (2018)

== Publications ==
- Down Time (2013)
- Words From a Porch (2018)
- October (2018)
