= Wait for Love =

Wait for Love may refer to:

- Wait for Love (song), a 1985 song by Luther Vandross
- Wait for Love (album), a 2018 album by Pianos Become the Teeth
- "Wait for Love", a single by Lindy Layton 1991
- "Wait for Love", a single by John Dahlbäck 2004
