= Touché Amoré =

American post-hardcore band

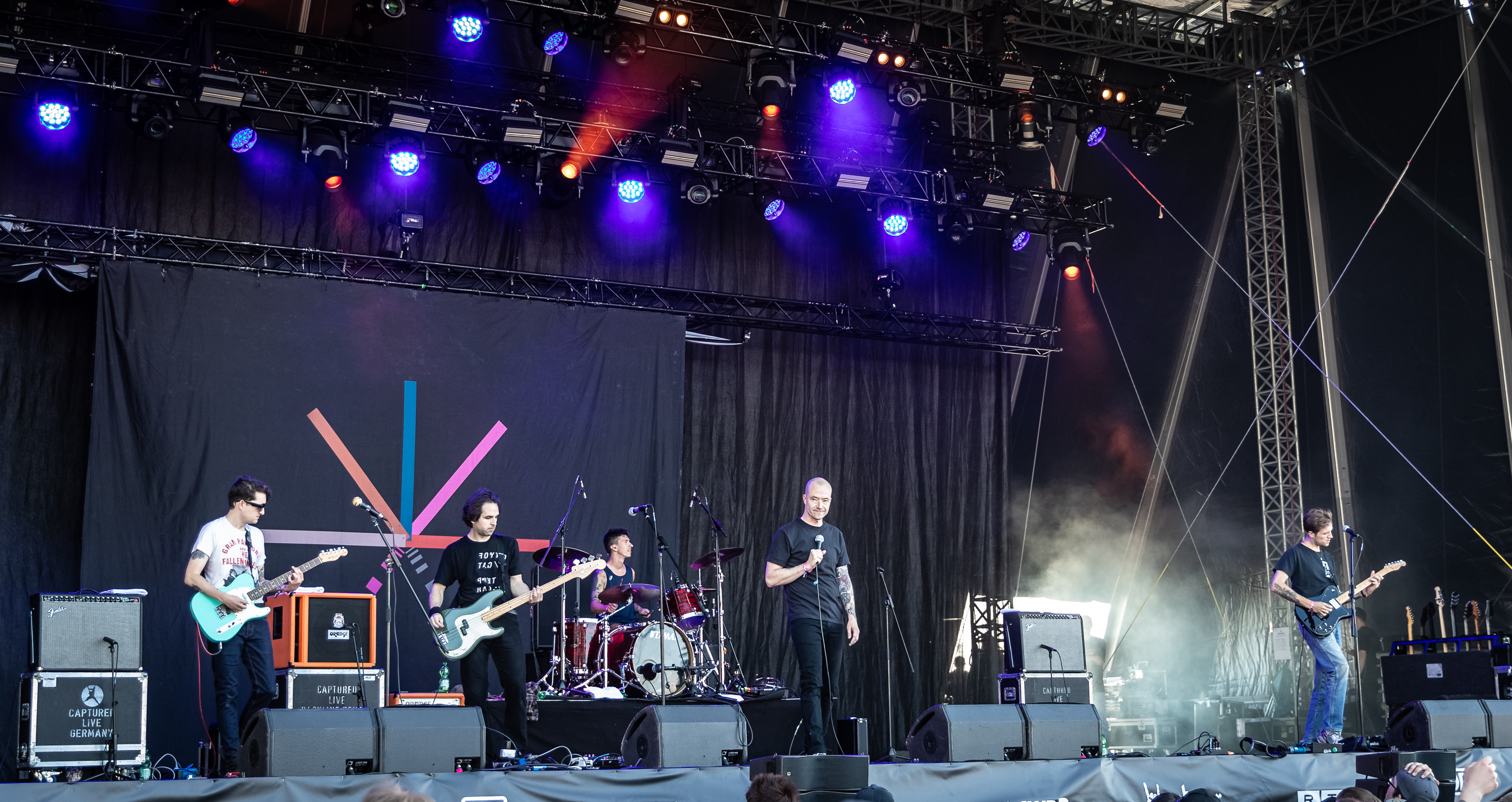
- Touché Amoré live at Rock am Ring 2023 in Nürburg, Germany

Background information
- Origin: Los Angeles, California, U.S.
- Genres: Post-hardcore; screamo; melodic hardcore
- Years active: 2007–present
- Labels: No Sleep; 6131; Deathwish; Epitaph; Rise
- Members: Jeremy Bolm; Nick Steinhardt; Clayton Stevens; Elliot Babin; Tyler Kirby
- Past members: Jeremy Zsupnik; Tyson White
- Website: toucheamore.com

Touché Amoré is an American post-hardcore band from Los Angeles formed in 2007. Since 2010, the band has consisted of vocalist Jeremy Bolm, guitarists Clayton Stevens and Nick Steinhardt, bassist Tyler Kirby, and drummer Elliot Babin. To date, Touché Amoré has released six studio albums: ...To the Beat of a Dead Horse in 2009, Parting the Sea Between Brightness and Me in 2011, Is Survived By in 2013, Stage Four in 2016, Lament in 2020, and Spiral in a Straight Line in 2024.

The band is considered part of the musical movement known as "the wave", consisting of American post-hardcore bands that emerged from the late 2000s through early 2010s – among them La Dispute, Defeater, Pianos Become the Teeth, and Make Do and Mend. Pitchfork said the band is "reliably cathartic and anthemic melodic post-hardcore", while Stereogum remarked in 2016 of the band's style: "If arena hardcore existed, this is how it might sound."

== History ==
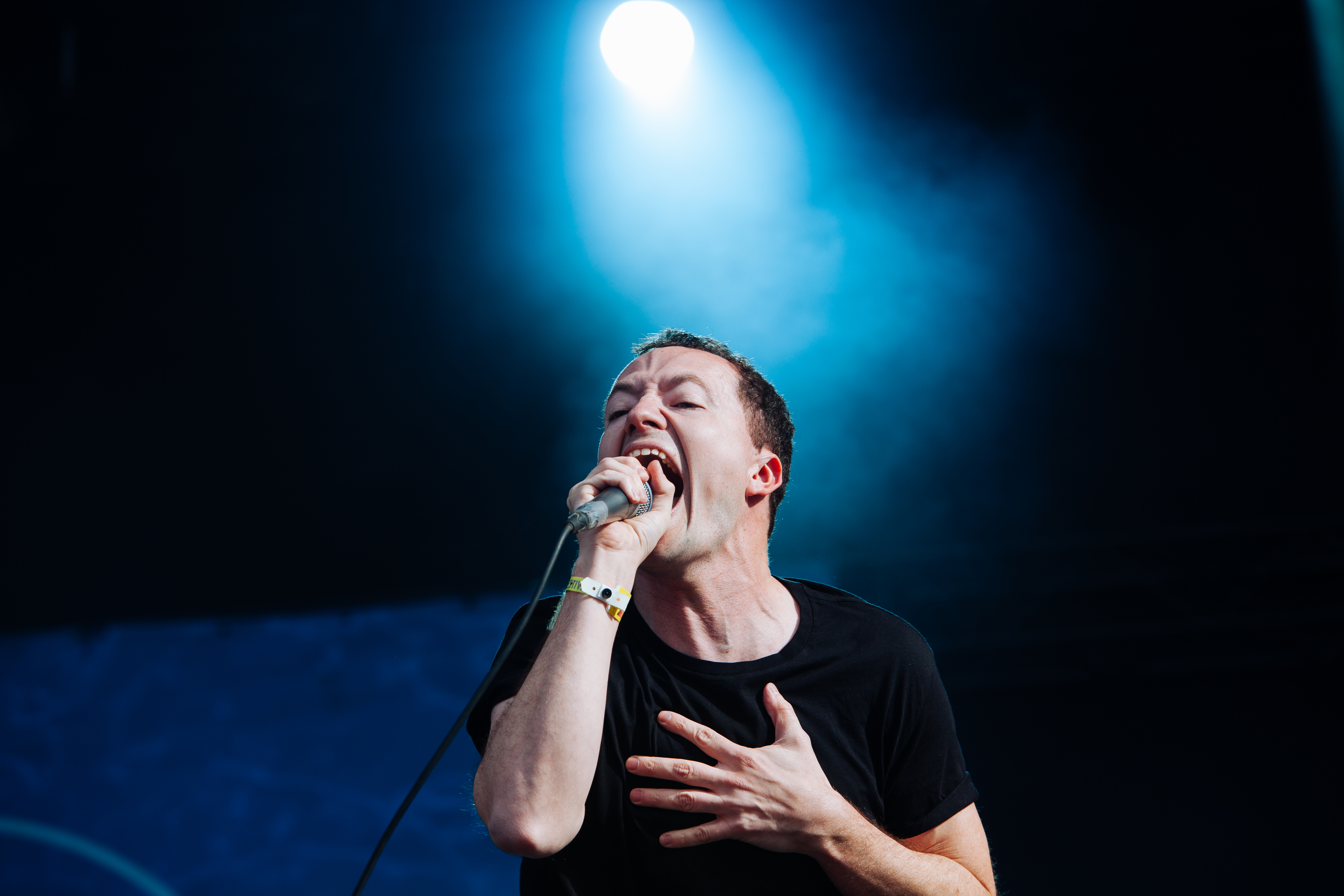
Jeremy Bolm performing with Touché Amoré at Highfield Festival 2014 in Leipzig, Germany

=== Formation and debut album (2007–2009) ===
The band released their debut 7-inch demo on No Sleep Records in September 2008. After a few West Coast tours, the band recorded an album entitled ...To the Beat of a Dead Horse at Earth Capital studios in January 2009 and the LP was released in June 2009 through 6131 Records and Geoff Rickly of Thursday's Collect Records, both of whom were in a partnership during the release. The album was released only on LP format and digital and was met with generally positive reviews from critics including Sputnikmusic, Punknews.org, and Alternative Press. It made its way onto multiple "Best Albums of 2009" lists.

=== Parting the Sea Between Brightness and Me (2010–2012) ===
Touché Amoré's second studio album, Parting the Sea Between Brightness and Me, was released on June 7, 2011, through independent record label Deathwish Inc. The band worked with producer and engineer Ed Rose at his Black Lodge Recording Studio in Eudora, Kansas. Bolm considers the album to be lyrically centered around the deterioration of relationships and finding comfort in the distance from home while touring, saying "It [the album] became relative to everything that was going on at that moment."

The album received praise from multiple reviewers, as well as being placed No. 6 on Rock Sound's annual "Album of the Year" chart at the end of 2011. Immediate promotion for the album's release in Europe led to being the main support band for La Dispute, with Death Is Not Glamorous, a Norwegian hardcore punk band supporting. The tour began on July 27, 2011 and finished August 12, coinciding with both La Dispute's and Touché Amoré's appearances at Hevy Festival in the United Kingdom, Fluff Fest in the Czech Republic, and Ieperfest in Belgium. During late February and March 2012, Touché Amoré toured the United Kingdom with Pianos Become the Teeth and Basement. Basement supported Touché Amoré for the first half of the tour, while Pianos Become the Teeth opened for them during the latter half. In between the headlined February and March dates, the band supported Rise Against and Architects on a European tour. In May 2012, Touché Amoré recorded and a released a live extended play called Live on BBC Radio 1. The EP contains four recorded tracks and features Jordan Dreyer of La Dispute as guest vocals on a song.

The band toured in support of Circa Survive in late 2012, and toured Europe and the UK with Converge in November/December 2012.

=== Is Survived By (2013–2015) ===
After returning home from their first tour in Japan with Loma Prieta, the band went into the studio to record a new album in Los Angeles at the Seagrass Studio with producer Brad Wood (Sunny Day Real Estate, MewithoutYou, the Smashing Pumpkins ). On June 27, 2013, the band unveiled their album title and the September 24, 2013 release date. Is Survived By was released on Deathwish Inc. The opening track of the album, "Just Exist," premiered on July 30.

The first tour after this new album was a direct support slot for AFI, followed by a European headlining tour with Self Defense Family and Dad Punchers (now Warm Thoughts). While in Europe, the band recorded a second BBC Live on Radio 1 session, featuring three songs from Is Survived By and "Gravity, Metaphorically" from the Pianos Become the Teeth 7-inch split. The recording was released as Live on BBC Radio 1 Vol 2 on 7-inch September 2014 by Deathwish Inc. In 2014 the band toured the U.S., co-headlining with mewithoutYou, performed at SXSW 2014, returned to Europe with Birds in Row supporting, headlined a Summer U.S. tour with Tigers Jaw and Dads in support, and returned to UK / Europe to perform at festivals in Reading and Leeds in the U.K. as well as Pukkelpop in Belgium. The band played in Russia for the first time in August. In the Fall of 2014 the band did one final US tour in support of Is Survived By with Rise Against. They returned to Japan to tour with ENVY in October, then finished out the year at The Fest in Gainesville, Florida on Halloween Night.

In 2015 the band limited touring but returned to Australia with Every Time I Die, then toured Europe with Loma Prieta, Dangers, and Newmoon, after performing at the 2015 Coachella Festival. A collaborative split with Self Defense Family, Self Love, was released in 2015 and contains songs which the bands wrote and recorded together with producer Will Yip.

=== Stage Four (2016–2018) ===
Touché Amoré released their fourth studio album with Epitaph Records, titled Stage Four, which debuted on September 16, 2016. The title of the album takes on a double meaning, hinting at both the fact that it's the band's fourth full-length album, and also the highest level of cancer staging—a reference to the fact that Bolm's mother died of cancer in 2014. Coinciding with the album's announcement in June 2016, the band released the track "Palm Dreams" for online streaming. The track is about Bolm realizing he will never fully understand why his mom moved to California in the 1970s. He said, "I assume that because she was from a small town, her eyes were wide with the concept of Hollywood. I'm sure someone else in my family could tell me, but it wouldn't be her answer. If this song inspires anyone to ask the questions they've never asked their loved ones, I'd call it a success."

After releasing Stage Four, the band spent the next several months touring and playing festivals to help promote their new album, which included shows with Balance and Composure and Hum, a U.S. tour with Tiny Moving Parts and Culture Abuse, and festival performances at Sound on Sound Fest in Austin, Texas and The Wrecking Ball festival in Atlanta. On October 5, 2016, the band announced that they will be doing a U.K./European tour with Angel Du$t in early 2017. The band went on a US tour with Thursday and Basement in Spring of 2017. On April 19, 2018, the band released a new single titled "Green", via Epitaph Records.

=== Dead Horse X, Lament and Spiral in a Straight Line (2019–present) ===
Celebrating the tenth anniversary of their debut album, ...To The Beat Of A Dead Horse, the band re-recorded the entirety of the album and released it on August 9, 2019, under the name of Dead Horse X. On September 10, 2019, the band released a new single titled "Deflector", via Epitaph Records. It was produced by Ross Robinson. On February 17, 2020, the band returned to Robinson to record their upcoming fifth album.

In late July 2020, the band started mailing out flexi discs with a new song Limelight to fans, the song featuring singer Andy Hull from the band Manchester Orchestra. On July 29, the band officially released Limelight as a single and announced their 5th studio album, Lament, to be released on October 9, 2020. The band released 3 subsequent singles for the album, Deflector on September 11, 2019, I'll Be Your Host on September 2, 2020, and Reminders on September 30, 2020. They also released two music videos, one for Limelight and another one for Reminders, the latter of which consisted of clips of friends of the band with their pets, and featured such people as Jason Aalon Butler, Skrillex, Frank Iero, Keith Buckley, and Andy Hull.

Lament has been described by Bolm as a companion piece to Stage Four, whilst being a departure from the topic of the earlier record. When asked about the record and its relation to Stage Four, Bolm said “I knew I didn't want to write any more songs about that subject matter, because: a) I've done it already, b) I don't really want to keep living in that headspace, and c) I need to move on from that, as a human. I could literally write five more albums about it, but that's not good for me or anybody.” Lament was released to positive critical reviews, amassing a Metascore of 83.

At Outbreak Fest 2024 in Manchester, U.K. the band shared they'd been working "tirelessly" on a new album and debuted a new song live from it called "Nobody's". The studio version of "Nobody's" debuted on July 24, along with the official announcement of their forthcoming record Spiral in a Straight Line, which was released on October 11 via Rise Records. On April 23, 2025, the band announced via Instagram that they would be playing at Riot Fest in Chicago in September 2025.

== Musical style and influences ==
Critics have categorised Touché Amoré's music as post-hardcore, screamo and melodic hardcore.

The band have cited influences including Daïtro, Raein, La Quiete, Thursday, Comadre, Saetia, Majority Rule, Orchid, the Hope Conspiracy, Modern Life Is War, Cursive, American Nightmare, Pg.99, the Replacements, the Nerve Agents, Isis, Sonic Youth, the National, Moss Icon, R.E.M., Deftones, Leonard Cohen, Emmylou Harris, Envy, Jimmy Eat World, Death Cab for Cutie, Converge, Galaxie 500, Arab Strap, Talking Heads, Christian Lee Hutson, and Rancid.

== Members ==
=== Current ===
- Jeremy Bolm – vocals (2007–present), occasional live guitar (2016–present)
- Clayton Stevens – lead guitar, keyboards (2007–present)
- Nick Steinhardt – bass (2007–2010), rhythm guitar (2010–present)
- Elliot Babin – drums, piano (2009–present)
- Tyler Kirby – bass (2010–present)

Current touring musicians

- Daniel Pouliot – drums (2025–present; substitute for Elliot Babin)
- David Haik - drums (2026–present; substitute for Elliot Babin)

=== Former ===
- Jeremy Zsupnik – drums (2007–2009)
- Tyson White – rhythm guitar (2007–2010)

== Discography ==
=== Studio albums ===
List of studio albums, with selected chart positions
Title	Album details	Peak chart positions
Title	Album details	US
...To the Beat of a Dead Horse	Released: August 4, 2009; Label: 6131 Records	—
Parting the Sea Between Brightness and Me	Released: June 7, 2011; Label: Deathwish Inc.	—
Is Survived By	Released: September 24, 2013; Label: Deathwish Inc.	85
Stage Four	Released: September 16, 2016; Label: Epitaph Records	168
Lament	Released: October 9, 2020; Label: Epitaph	—
Spiral in a Straight Line	Released: October 11, 2024; Label: Rise Records	—

=== Live albums ===
- 10 Years / 1000 Shows: Live at the Regent Theater (2018)

=== Extended plays and splits ===
- Demo (2008, No Sleep)
- Searching for a Pulse/The Worth of the World (split with La Dispute) (2010, No Sleep)
- Touché Amoré / Make Do and Mend (split with Make Do and Mend) (2010, 6131/Panic)
- Touché Amoré / The Casket Lottery (split with The Casket Lottery) (2012, No Sleep)
- Touché Amoré / Pianos Become the Teeth (split with Pianos Become the Teeth) (2013, Deathwish/Topshelf)
- Touché Amoré / Title Fight (split with Title Fight) (2013, Sea Legs)
- Self Love (split with Self Defense Family) (2015, Deathwish Inc.)
- Covers Vol. 1 (2021)
- Touché Amoré / Circa Survive (2022, split with Circa Survive)

=== Live EPs ===
- Live at WERS (2010, Condolences)
- Live on BBC Radio 1 (2012, Deathwish)
- Live on BBC Radio 1: Vol 2 (2014, Deathwish)
- Live on BBC Radio 1: Vol 3 (2017, Epitaph)
- Live on BBC Radio 1: Vol 4 (2025, Rise Records)
- Live on BBC Radio 1: Vol 5 (2025, Rise Records)

=== Singles ===
- "Gravity, Metaphorically" (2013)
- "Condolences"/"Available Flexi" (2015)
- "Green" (2018)
- "Deflector" (2019)
- Nobody's (2024)
- Hal Ashby (2024)
- Diamond Keys (2026)
- ''(I Can't Get Out Of) My Own Way'' (2026)

=== Music videos ===
- "Home Away from Here" (2011)
- "Gravity, Metaphorically" (2013)
- "Harbor" (2013)
- "Palm Dreams" (2016)
- "Skyscraper" (2016)
- "Benediction" (2017)
- "Green" (2018)
- "Limelight" (2020)
- "Reminders" (2020)
- "Lament" (2020)

=== Compilation contributions ===
- "Available" (The National cover; compilation album A Comp for Mom) (2014, No Sleep Records)
- "Lounge Act" (Nirvana cover; tribute album Whatever Nevermind) (2015, Robotic Empire)
- The Apollo Programme Was A Hoax (Refused cover; tribute album The Shape of Punk to Come Obliterated (2024, Epitaph Records )
