= Nyah Fearties =

Scottish music band

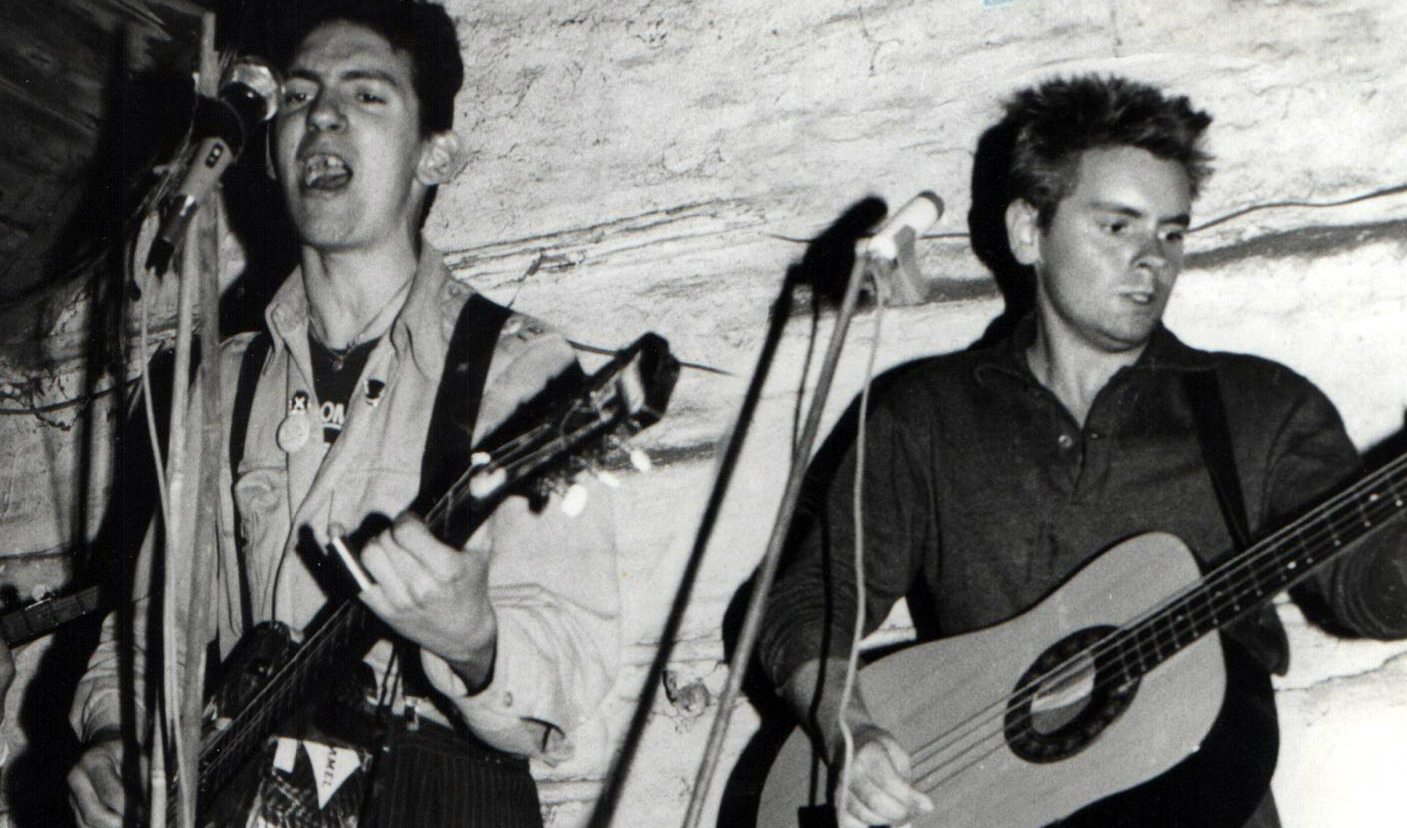
- Nyah Fearties

Background information
- Origin: Lugton, Scotland
- Genres: Post-punk, industrial, alternative rock, Celtic punk, folk punk
- Years active: 1986–1999
- Labels: Atypeek Music
- Members: Davy Wiseman, Stephen Wiseman

Nyah Fearties were a Scottish music band from the village of Lugton, Scotland, that created a near-unique brand of anarchic modern folk between 1982 and 1995.

Combining the rich traditional music and storytelling culture of its native Ayrshire, with a jarring punk ethos, madcap humour and improvised acoustic instrumentation (though usually amplified), the band made a significant contribution to the British folk-punk scene of the 1980s and 1990s.

It often tested live audiences with a feedback-laced aural assault, more akin to experimental rock groups like Velvet Underground or The Jesus and Mary Chain, than an acoustic folk act. In addition, Nyah Fearties were known for utilising all manner of improvised and imaginative musical paraphernalia.

Examples of the latter included bashing upturned metal dustbins to create percussion, and the use of an archaic gramophone upon which Andy Stewart records were 'scratched' in the style of a hip-hop DJ.

Nyah Fearties have been described as a kind of hybrid between Celtic folk-punk outfit The Pogues, and Glasgow-based industrial music band Test Dept. Yet this is a somewhat misleading analogy. As Stuart Cosgrove noted in the NME (March 14, 1987): "The Fearties are more critical than The Pogues, their Scotland is not a place to be eulogised… it's a home whose myths are savagely demolished…they use found percussion but stripped of Test Dept's artiness…"

Nyah Fearties had at its core the brothers Stephen Wiseman and David Wiseman, although the pair were often joined - both in recorded and live performance - by a wide and varying ad hoc circle of guest musicians, friends and acquaintances.

The band were championed by, among others, The Pogues whom they supported on a tour of France after an impromptu 1986 pavement audition outside the Devonshire Arms pub in Camden Town, London. In addition, Pogues drummer Andrew Ranken made a cameo vocal appearance on Nyah Fearties debut album A Tasty Heidfu' recorded that same year.

During a 13-year career Nyah Fearties barely emerged from its underground roots, enjoying little or no commercial success while maintaining a loyal cult following. The band did, however, make a live appearance on primetime British television music programme The Tube and hosted a one-off Lugton Loonie Show for BBC Radio Scotland.

Following Nyah Fearties demise, David Wiseman went on to help found a new band Dub Skelper, while more recently the Wiseman brothers were reunited in yet another musical project, Junkman's Choir.

== Discography ==
Albums

- A Tasty Heidfu' (1986)
- Desperation o' a Dyin' Culture (1990)
- A Keech in a Poke (1994)
- Skud (1994)
- Grandpa Craw (1995)

EPs

- Good, Bad and Alkies (1987)
- Red Kola (1993)
