= Atypeek Music =

International digital label

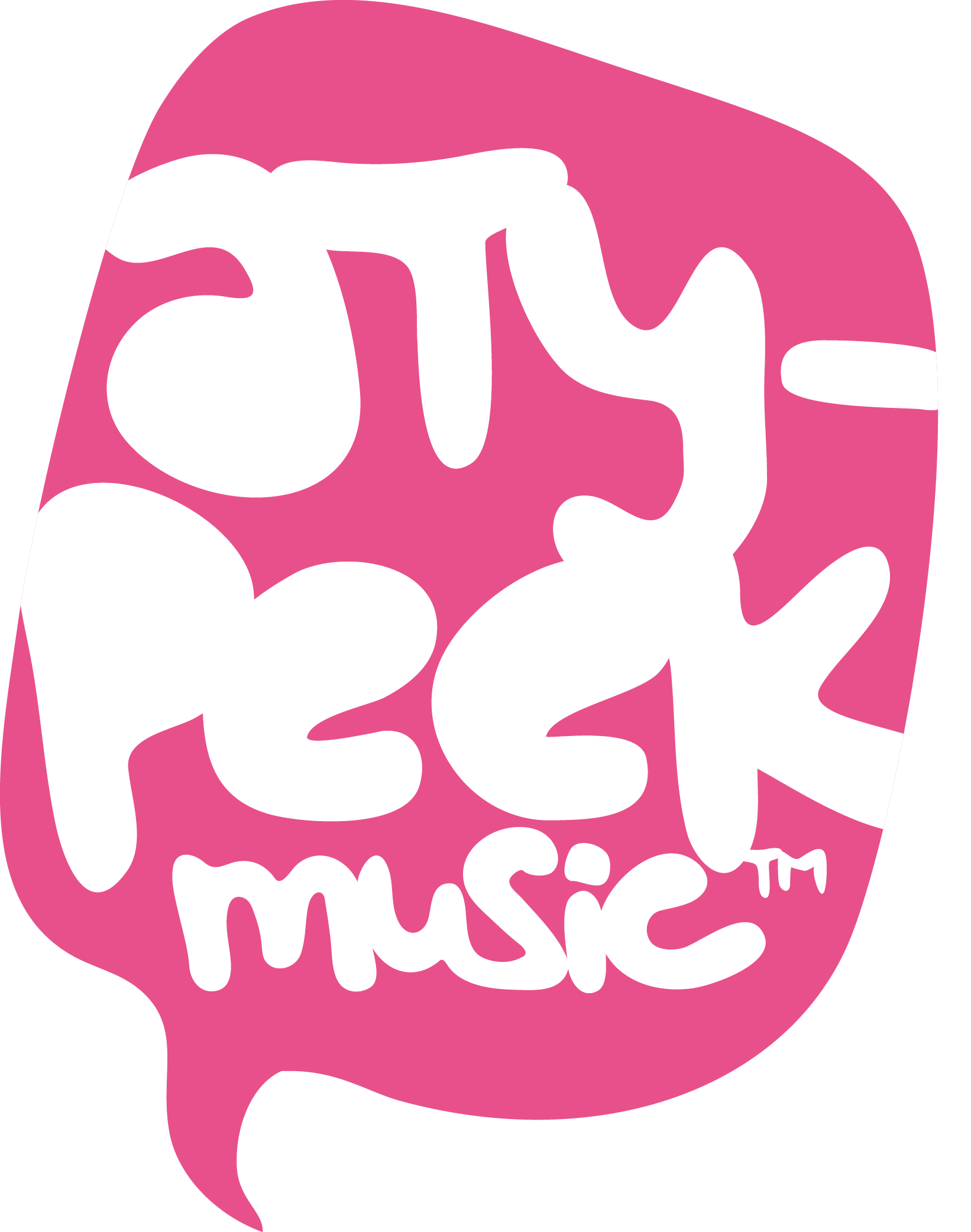
- Founded: 1988
- Founder: Christophe Féray
- Distributor: The Orchard United States
- Genre: Noise rock Post-punk; Avant-garde music Free improvisation Alternative rock Experimental music Noise music Ambient music Industrial music Punk rock Post-rock; Free jazz Post-metal; Stoner rock Avant-garde jazz Jazz; Electronic music Drone music Psychedelic music Sludge metal Math rock Hip hop music Trap music Spoken word Minimal music
- Country of origin: France
- Location: Lyon
- Official website: www.atypeekmusic.com/

Atypeek Music is an international digital label, which resulted from the association of Go Get Organized (GGO) and Agony. GGO is one of the last French alternative labels (1988 – 1993). The name of the label, Go Get Organized, comes from a song by the Redskins; it enhances the commitment of this generation's independent labels. It was founded in 1988 by a group of artists and musicians. The label explored a surprisingly large panel of genres at the time, going through garage rock, hard-core, stoner rock, grunge, noise music, no wave, jazz-core, noise rap and industrial music. The label soon stands out from other French labels and the alternative music stage by looking for unusual artists, taking a particular interest in grunge music, American noise rock, experimental and minimalist music such as the work of the very controversial Patrick Dorobisz, Witches Valley, Lucrate Milk, Moodie Black, Dookoom, Genghis Khan, Les Vulves Assassines, The Rogues or Schlaasss and Little Annie (Annie Anxiety). Founded in 1988, the same year as Sub Pop, the label entered into negotiations with the Seattle-based independent label for the European licensing of the album that would follow Bleach, by a then little-known young band called Nirvana. The deal was reportedly agreed in principle when, one evening, the label’s fax machine delivered unexpected news: Nirvana had signed a major-label deal, putting the proposed European licensing agreement into question. The opportunity was ultimately lost, a major disappointment for the label at the time. Other projects, however, were already underway. In 1991, the label secured a European licensing agreement with Primo Scree for Spine of God, the debut studio album by Monster Magnet. The release became another major commercial success for the label, further establishing its position in the independent music market. In 1993, the label changed its name and became Agony (Agony and the Ecstasy). Agony (1993 – 2012) then became GGO, turning more toward noise rock with bands such as Enablers, Kim Gordon, Loren Connors, Davy Jones Locker, Hint, Condense, Heliogabale and Kill the Thrill before becoming Atypeek Music in 2013. It is also during this year that its previous productions and new artists are shared on digital platforms. Artists released on Atypeek Music: Monster Magnet, Arto Lindsay, Fred Frith, Cop Shoot Cop, The Legendary Pink Dots, Caspar Brötzmann, William Hooker, Ted Milton, Chloé Delaume, Oddateee, Krackhouse, DOPPLeR, Paloalto, Les Vulves Assassines, Anarchist Republic Of Bzzz, Geins't Naït, Ben Sharpa, Chris Conde, Barbara Panther, Arne Vinzon, Anne Horel, Oto, Ivy Crystal, The Rogues, Sirabella... Atypeek Music stays under the artistic direction of Christophe Féray. Atypeek Music has taken in artists from partner labels like Disques Futura et Marge (Futura Marge), Noise Product, Dokidoki, Solar Flare, Permis de Construire Deutschland (PDCD), micr0lab and RecRec Music. Atypeek Music was distributed on iTunes and all the major digital music distribution stores. In 2016, the structure published the first issue of the magazine "Atypeek Mag", a collaborative music and generalist magazine. In 2018, following the death of founder Gérard Terronès, Christophe Féray assumed the management of the Futura Marge label. In 2021, Atypeek Music and the label Jarring Effects joined forces to create a new label called Daaganda Records (Daisy Mortem, UltraMoule, 100 guitares sur un bateau ivre, Mauvais Sang...).

== Associated labels ==
Atypeek Music operates and collaborates with several associated labels, including Futura Marge and Daaganda Records.

== Artists ==
=== Current artists ===
- 10PUTE
- 300
- (The True) Scorpio Rising
- Abandon
- Abrams
- Achwghâ Ney Wodeï
- Across The Waves
- Ada Peel
- Adrien Kessler
- Aghostino
- Alfie Ryner
- Allister Sinclair
- Al'Tarba
- Amantra
- Anarchist Republic of Bzzz
- Angle Mort & Clignotant
- Anne Horel
- Apollonius Abraham Schwarz
- April Fishes
- Arne Vinzon
- Arto Lindsay
- A Shape
- Biollante
- Black Ink Stain
- Blair
- Blast
- Brice et sa Pute
- Ça
- Cable Regime
- Cantenac Dagar
- Caspar Brötzmann (Caspar Brötzmann-Massaker)
- Chaman Chômeur
- Chantal Morte
- Chevo Légé
- Chewbacca
- Chromb!
- Clara Clara
- Claude Favre / Nicolas Dick
- Chloé Delaume
- Coax Orchestra
- Condense
- Cop Shoot Cop
- Cosmic Wurst
- Çub
- Cut The Navel String
- Davy Jones Locker
- DAiKiRi
- Dark Radish
- Dead Hippies
- Dead Oldman (dědъ)
- Deborah Kant
- Derby Derby
- Deux Boules Vanille
- Devilish Piranhas
- Dookoom
- DOPPLeR
- Double Nelson
- Dum Dum Boys
- Eliogabal
- Emboe
- Enablers
- Enob
- Fall Of Because
- Faro
- F.A.T.
- FAT32
- Fisherman
- Fragile Figures
- Fragment.
- Fred Frith
- Gabriel Hibert
- Geins't Naït
- Genghis Khan
- Gerard Jugno 106
- Gift Of Blindness
- G.I. Love
- Gin Palace
- Gore / Hoer*
- Goz of Kermeur
- Greyfell
- Grill
- Grosso Gadgetto
- Hal
- Have The Moskovik
- Heliogabale
- Hems
- Herr Geisha And The Boobs
- Hint
- Hippie Diktat
- HoaxHoax
- Icsis
- In Love With
- Infecticide
- ISaAC
- I, Useless
- Ivy Crystal
- June Bug
- Kabbel
- Kaschalot
- Kai Reznik
- Kaosis
- Karaba F.C.
- Kill the Thrill
- Kim Gordon
- Kouma
- Krackhouse
- La Phaze
- Laurent Pernice
- Lèche Moi
- L'Effondras
- Lucrate Milk
- Loki Lonestar
- Loren Connors
- Louis Minus XVI
- Les Vulves Assassines
- Lynhood
- Mad River
- Manikineter
- Mank Down
- Marteau Mu
- Margaret Catcher
- Marvin
- Massicot
- Mata
- Melaine Dalibert
- Membrane
- Mia Vita Violenta
- Microfilm
- MilesDavisQuintet!
- Miles Oliver
- Milkilo
- Mismerizer
- Moaan Exis
- Moodie Black
- Moonya
- Moist
- Mortar (Various Artists) - Cable Regime - Cop Shoot Cop - Nox - Caspar Brötzmann-Massaker - Gore / Hoer - Fall Of Because - Grill
- Namoro
- Ned
- Neige Morte
- Ni
- Nicolas Dick
- Noise Gate
- Nox
- Noyades
- Nyah Fearties
- Oblik
- Oddateee
- Oto
- Owls Are Not
- Owun
- Palo Alto
- Pam Risourié
- Patrick Dorobisz
- Penthouse
- Philippe Petit
- Phurpa
- PointPointVirgulePointvirguleCrochetParenthèse
- Polymorphie
- Pore
- Postcoïtum
- Princesse Näpalm
- Projet O - Nà
- Projet O - Marmalade
- Pù
- Queen Elephantine
- Rature
- Red City Noise
- $afia Bahmed-Schwartz
- Sathönay
- Scarlatti Goes Electro
- Schlaasss
- Sébastien Guérive
- Sheik Anorak
- Shotgun Babies
- Simiam Lucis
- Sirabella
- Sisygambis
- Sliding Words
- Snap
- Sofy Major
- Spectrum Orchestrum
- Spook
- Stoned Diplodocus
- Suzanne'Silver
- Table
- Tapso II
- Ted Milton meets Goz of Kermeur
- Théo Ceccaldi
- Télépagaille
- Térébenthine
- Terminal Cheesecake
- The Automatists
- The Crooner Of Doom
- The Dirteez
- The Glad Husbands
- The Legendary Pink Dots
- The Rogues
- Thierry Arnal
- This Is Daddy Long Legs
- This Side of Jordan
- Thompson Rollets
- The Wøøøh
- Tim
- Time to Burn
- Tombouctou
- Tout de Suite
- Toy Killers
- Toys'R'Noise
- Traître Câlin
- Tripes
- Ueno Park - Manuel Adnot solo
- uKanDanZ
- Ultra Panda
- Untitled With Drums
- Valse Noot
- Vesicatoria
- Videoiid
- Watertank
- Waveland
- William Hooker Quartet
- Witches Valley
- WRISTS
- Xavier Saïki
- YN
- You Freud, Me Jane
- Zarboth

== Discography ==
- Thompson Rollets - Crazy Soldier / Never Be Like You + Bitch - Digital publishing (2013) (Atypeek Music) - Record producer: Brett Myers
- Witches Valley - Do You Like It? + Here's To You - Digital publishing (2013) (Atypeek Music)
- Witches Valley -Extreme Return To The Source - Digital publishing (2013) (Atypeek Music) - (ADFR)
- Dum Dum Boys - In A Cotton Candy World - Digital publishing (2013) (Atypeek Music)
- G.I. Love - Chemical Gardens - Digital publishing (2013) (Atypeek Music)- Record producer: Cecil English
- Davy Jones Locker - Palpable - Digital publishing (2013) (Atypeek Music)
- Sisygambis - Four Stages Of Cruelty - Digital publishing (2013) (Atypeek Music)
- The Automatists - Bad Queen Ep - Digital publishing (2013) (Atypeek Music)
- Pore - Rotation - Digital publishing (2013) (Atypeek Music) - (PDCD)
- Kill the Thrill - Dig - Digital publishing (2013) (Atypeek Music) - (Noise Product)
- Nicolas Dick - Une Belle Journée - Digital publishing (2013) (Atypeek Music)
- Time To Burn - Is.Land - Digital publishing (2013) (Atypeek Music)
- The Dirteez - The Wild Side Of Love - Digital publishing (2013) (Atypeek Music)
- Davy Jones Locker - Green Album - Digital publishing (2013) (Atypeek Music)- Record producer: Kramer
- Noise Gate - Peace & Work - Digital publishing (2013) (Atypeek Music) - (Noise Product)
- Heliogabale - Yolk - Digital publishing (2013) (Atypeek Music)
- (The True) Scorpio Rising - Phallus Imperator - Digital publishing (2013) (Atypeek Music)
- Goz Of Kermeur - Irondelles - Digital publishing (2013) (Atypeek Music) - (Noise Product)
- Davy Jones Locker - I Shake My Head (EP) - Digital publishing (2013) (Atypeek Music)
- Time To Burn - Starting Point - Digital publishing (2013) (Atypeek Music)
- Time To Burn - Burn the lie down - Digital publishing (2013) (Atypeek Music)
- Heliogabale - To Pee - Digital publishing (2013) (Atypeek Music)
- (The True) Scorpio Rising - I Know You But You don’t Know Me - Digital publishing (2013) (Atypeek Music)
- ISaAC - Herpès Maker - Digital publishing (2013) (Atypeek Music)
- Patrick Dorobisz - Sneeuw - Digital publishing (2013) (Atypeek Music)
- Patrick Dorobisz - Couleurs et lumière - Digital publishing (2013) (Atypeek Music)
- Noise Gate - Illusion of Victory - Digital publishing (2013) (Atypeek Music) - (Noise Product)
- Davy Jones Locker - S/T - Digital publishing (2013) (Atypeek Music)
- Sisygambis - Interficias te Ipsum - Digital publishing (2013) (Atypeek Music)
- Ted Milton Meets Goz Of Kermeur - Inflated Edge - Digital publishing (2013) (Atypeek Music) - (Noise Product)
- Kill the Thrill - Low - Digital publishing (2013) (Atypeek Music) - (Noise Product)
- Time To Burn - B Sides - Digital publishing (2013) (Atypeek Music)
- Pore - Dorsale - Digital publishing (2013) (Atypeek Music) - (PDCD)
- Claude Favre & Nicolas Dick - Autopsies - Digital publishing (2013) (Atypeek Music)
- Sisygambis (feat. Gérard Giachi) - Pour en finir - EP - Digital publishing (2013) (Atypeek Music)
- Davy Jones Locker - Ultimate - Digital publishing (2013) (Atypeek Music)
- Abandon - Tunnels - Digital publishing (2013) (Atypeek Music)
- Térébenthine - Terebenthine - Digital publishing (2013) (Atypeek Music)
- (The True) Scorpio Rising - Brain Catalogue - Digital publishing (2013) (Atypeek Music)
- Davy Jones Locker - Single - Digital publishing (2013) (Atypeek Music)
- Goz of Kermeur - Goz of Kermeur - Digital publishing (2013) (Atypeek Music) - (Noise Product)
- ISaAC / Térébenthine - IT - (SPL)IT Vinyle (Atypeek Music - Poutrage Records - Ocinatas Industries) - Digital publishing (2014) (Atypeek Music)
- Witches Valley - Rien Résiste Aux Racines - Digital publishing (2014) (Atypeek Music)
- Abandon - House of Cards - Digital publishing (2014) (Atypeek Music)
- (The True) Scorpio Rising - The Invisible Society - Digital publishing (2013) (Atypeek Music)
- Abandon - Monsters - Digital publishing (2014) (Atypeek Music)
- Mortar - Various Artists - Cable Regime - Cop Shoot Cop - Nox - Caspar Brötzmann-Massaker - Gore / Hoer - Fall Of Because - Grill - Digital publishing (2014) (Atypeek Music) (PDCD)
- Hems - Lourd comme l’air - Digital publishing (2014) (Atypeek Music)
- Grill - Light - Digital publishing (2014) (Atypeek Music) - (PDCD)
- Hal - Gorilla Conspiration - Digital publishing (2014) (Atypeek Music) - (PDCD)
- Lucrate Milk - I Love You Fuck Off - Digital publishing (2014) (Atypeek Music)
- Fragment. - Temporary Enlightenment - Digital publishing (2014) (Atypeek Music)
- Nyah Fearties - A Tasty Heidfu' - Digital publishing (2014) (Atypeek Music)
- Witches Valley - Extrem Return To The Source - Digital publishing (2014) (Atypeek Music) (Auto Da Fé)
- Mad River - Face To The Sea - Digital publishing (2014) (Atypeek Music)
- Laurent Pernice - Détails - Digital publishing (2014) (Atypeek Music) (PDCD)
- (The True) Scorpio Rising - The Blues Resurrection Project - Digital publishing (2014) (Atypeek Music)
- Mad River - Shining - Digital publishing (2014) (Atypeek Music)
- Red City Noise - Rmx - Digital publishing (2014) (Atypeek Music)
- Kouma - Brazilian Blowout - Digital publishing (2014) (Atypeek Music)
- Deborah Kant - Terminal Rail / Route - Digital publishing (2014) (Atypeek Music)
- uKanDanZ - Lantchi Biyé / Endè Iyèrusalém - Single - Digital publishing (2014) (Atypeek Music)
- Red City Noise - Black Lodge - Digital publishing (2014) (Atypeek Music)
- Hippie Diktat - Black Peplum - Digital publishing (2014) (Atypeek Music)
- Heliogabale - Mobile Home - Digital publishing (2014) (Atypeek Music)
- Snap - Bras - Digital publishing (2014) (Atypeek Music)
- Kouma - Kouma - Digital publishing (2014) (Atypeek Music)
- Sheik Anorak - Keep your hands low - Digital publishing (2014) (Atypeek Music)
- Alfie Ryner - Brain Surgery - Digital publishing (2014) (Atypeek Music)
- Zarboth - Zarboth - Digital publishing (2014) (Atypeek Music)
- Polymorphie - Voix - Digital publishing (2014) (Atypeek Music)
- Zarboth - Kwakiutls - Digital publishing (2014) (Atypeek Music)
- Devilish Piranhas - Greetings from the Voodoo Island of Lust! - Digital publishing (2014) (Atypeek Music)
- Heliogabale - Diving Rooms - Digital publishing (2014) (Atypeek Music)
- Coax Orchestra - Lent et sexuel - Digital publishing (2014) (Atypeek Music)
- Moist - Face Pack - Digital publishing (2014) (Atypeek Music)
- Goz of Kermeur - Mythoman - Digital publishing (2014) (Atypeek Music)
- Heliogabale - Mystery Trains - Xquisite - EP - Digital publishing (2014) (Atypeek Music)
- Laurent Pernice - Axident - Digital publishing (2014) (Atypeek Music)
- WRISTS - The Censorship Trap - Digital publishing (2015) (Atypeek Music)
- L'Effondras - L'effondras - Digital publishing (2015) (Atypeek Music)
- This Side Of Jordan - Set the Record Straight - Digital publishing (2015) (Atypeek Music)
- L'Effondras - Ferrum Movendo / Helleboros - Single - Digital publishing (2015) (Atypeek Music)
- Enablers - The Rightful Pivot - Digital publishing (2015) (Atypeek Music)
- Heliogabale - Blood - Digital publishing (2015) (Atypeek Music)
- Eliogabal - Mo - Digital publishing (2015) (Atypeek Music)
- Laurent Pernice - Exit to the City (Sortie Vers La Ville) - Digital publishing (2015) (Atypeek Music)
- Marteau Mu - Philitosa - Digital publishing (2015) (Atypeek Music)
- Owls Are Not - 2 - Digital publishing (2015) (Atypeek Music)
- Xavier Saïki - Moraine - Digital publishing (2015) (Atypeek Music)
- Shotgun Babies - Private Games - Digital publishing (2015) (Atypeek Music)
- Aghostino - Collarbones Full of Cocoons - Digital publishing (2015) (Atypeek Music)
- Membrane - Membrane - Digital publishing (2015) (Atypeek Music)
- Ni - Les insurgés de Romilly - Digital publishing (2015) (Atypeek Music)
- Gift of Blindness - Gift of Blindness - Digital publishing (2015) (Atypeek Music)
- Schlaasss - Slaasssch - Digital publishing (2015) (Atypeek Music)
- WRISTS - STSIRW - Digital publishing (2015) (Atypeek Music)
- WRISTS - Mountain of Skulls - EP - Digital publishing (2015) (Atypeek Music)
- Sathönay - Gaziosmanpasa - Digital publishing (2015) (Atypeek Music)
- Massicot - Morse - Digital publishing (2015) (Atypeek Music)
- Queen Elephantine - Omen - Digital publishing (2015) (Atypeek Music)
- Toy Killers - My Name Is Dirtier - Digital publishing (2015) (Atypeek Music)
- Jacques Barbéri & Laurent Pernice - L'apocalypse des oiseaux - Digital publishing (2015) (Atypeek Music)
- Laurent Pernice - Sept autres créatures - Digital publishing (2015) (Atypeek Music)
- Krackhouse - Comes Alive - Digital publishing (2015) (Atypeek Music)
- Ça - 24615 - Digital publishing (2015) (Atypeek Music)
- Sheik Anorak - Or - Digital publishing (2015) (Atypeek Music)
- HoaxHoax - Shot Revolver - Digital publishing (2015) (Atypeek Music)
- Kill the Thrill - 203 Barriers - Digital publishing (2015) (Atypeek Music)
- Enablers - Berlinesque - Digital publishing (2015) (Atypeek Music)
- Herr Geisha and The Boobs - Book of Mutations - Digital publishing (2015) (Atypeek Music)
- L'Effondras - Lemures / Je reste avec vous - Single - Digital publishing (2015) (Atypeek Music)
- Kill the Thrill - Tellurique - Digital publishing (2015) (Atypeek Music)
- Cut The Navel String - Takis - Digital publishing (2015) (Atypeek Music)
- Infecticide - Chansons tristes - Digital publishing (2015) (Atypeek Music)
- Condense - Bacteria / Ode to a Boss - Digital publishing (2015) (Atypeek Music)
- Vesicatoria - Awakening - Digital publishing (2015) (Atypeek Music)
- Laurent Pernice - Yppah - Digital publishing (2015) (Atypeek Music)
- Double Nelson - Un sentiment étrange - Digital publishing (2015) (Atypeek Music)
- Chantal Morte - No More - Digital publishing (2015) (Atypeek Music)
- Chantal Morte - Short Allemand - Digital publishing (2015) (Atypeek Music)
- Sheik Anorak - Let's Just Bullshit Our Way Through - Digital publishing (2016) (Atypeek Music)
- uKanDanZ - Awo - Digital publishing (2016) (Atypeek Music)
- Heliogabale - Mobile Home - Digital publishing (2016) (Atypeek Music)
- Spook - Blurred Head and Scrambled Eggs - Digital publishing (2016) (Atypeek Music)
- Dookoom - No! - Digital publishing (2016) (Atypeek Music)
- Chaman Chômeur - 18759 - Digital publishing (2016) (Atypeek Music)
- Ultra Panda - The New Bear - Digital publishing (2016) (Atypeek Music)
- Brice et sa Pute - Célibataires - Digital publishing (2016) (Atypeek Music)
- In Love With - Axel Erotic - Digital publishing (2016) (Atypeek Music)
- Enablers - The Achievement - Digital publishing (2016) (Atypeek Music)
- 10PUTE - Poupée russe - Digital publishing (2016) (Atypeek Music)
- Suzanne'Silver - Like Lazarus - Digital publishing (2016) (Atypeek Music)
- Laurent Pernice - Infrajazz - Digital publishing (2016) (Atypeek Music)
- April Fishes - Carpe d'or - Digital publishing (2016) (Atypeek Music)
- F.A.T. - Animal - Digital publishing (2016) (Atypeek Music)
- Margaret Catcher - We Want More - Digital publishing (2016) (Atypeek Music)
- Enablers - Now You Can Answer My Prayers - Digital publishing (2016) (Atypeek Music)
- Fragment. - Nothing Will Ever Be the Same - Single - Digital publishing (2016) (Atypeek Music)
- G.I. Love - 16 Hardcore Romances, Far out Experiments, Fuzzy Sounds and Off-Limit Overdrive - Digital publishing (2016) (Atypeek Music)
- Tapso II - Close Distances - Digital publishing (2016) (Atypeek Music)
- Double Nelson - Pousser la voiture - Digital publishing (2016) (Atypeek Music)
- Fragment. - Nothing Will Ever Be the Same - Digital publishing (2016) (Atypeek Music)
- ICSIS - Pierre Vide Eau - Digital publishing (2016) (Atypeek Music)
- WRISTS - Eye Adjust EP - Digital publishing (2016) (Atypeek Music)
- Condense - Placebo - Digital publishing (2016) (Atypeek Music)
- Fragment. - Home - Digital publishing (2016) (Atypeek Music)
- Condense - Genuflex - Digital publishing (2016) (Atypeek Music)
- WRISTS - Power Comes in Many Forms - Digital publishing (2016) (Atypeek Music)
- Mank Down - Thred EP - Digital publishing (2016) (Atypeek Music)

== See also ==
- List of record labels
- No wave
- Industrial music
- Grunge
- Noise rock
- Post-rock
- Minimal music
- Hip hop music
- Ambient music
- Shoegazing
