= Schlaasss =

French rap-rave group

- Origin: France
- Genres: Alternative hip hop; electronic dance; rave; Hip hop; Trap music; punk rock
- Years active: 2012–present
- Labels: Jarring Effects; Atypeek Music
- Members: Charlie Dirty Duran; Daddy Schwartz; Kiki (Bonetrip's)
- Website: schlaasss.fr

Schlaasss (French: [/chlɑs/]) is a music group from Saint-Étienne, France, formed in 2012. The band consists of Charlie Dirty Duran (vocals), Daddy Schwartz (vocals), Kiki (music production), and Mekki (videos). Schlaasss' musical style blends punk, rap and electronic music.

The group has appeared on Canal+, Vice, Télérama, Hétéroclite, Gonzaï, Noisey, Technikart, France Inter, Europe 1, as well as on the show "Ce soir ou jamais!" hosted by Frédéric Taddeï. Author Virginie Despentes mentioned Schlaasss in Vanity Fair magazine, as part of the soundtrack for "Vernon Subutex" and by including them in her editorial carte blanche for Les Inrockuptibles, where the band was interviewed.

Schlaasss has also collaborated with artists such as Masto (Lucrate Milk, Bérurier Noir) and the collective Dragones.

After touring in Japan (2017) and performing in New Caledonia (2018), Schlaasss continues to perform live.

== Style and influences ==
Schlaasss' music combines punk, rap, and electronic music, and draws from influences including trap music, and musicians like Divine, Tupac, M.I.A., Peaches and Bérurier Noir.

== Discography ==
=== Studio albums ===
- 2015 : Slaasssch
- 2017 : Casa Plaisance
- 2025 : Elégance

=== EPs ===
- 2014 : Tapin Ovlov
- 2018 : YOGA

=== Singles ===
- 2018 : ENVY
- 2023 : Biboonitz
- 2024 : Travail Famille Connasse
- 2025 : Tutu Toulemonde
- 2025 : Jurassique Parc
- 2025 : HAPPINESS
