= Overmars (band) =

French post-metal band

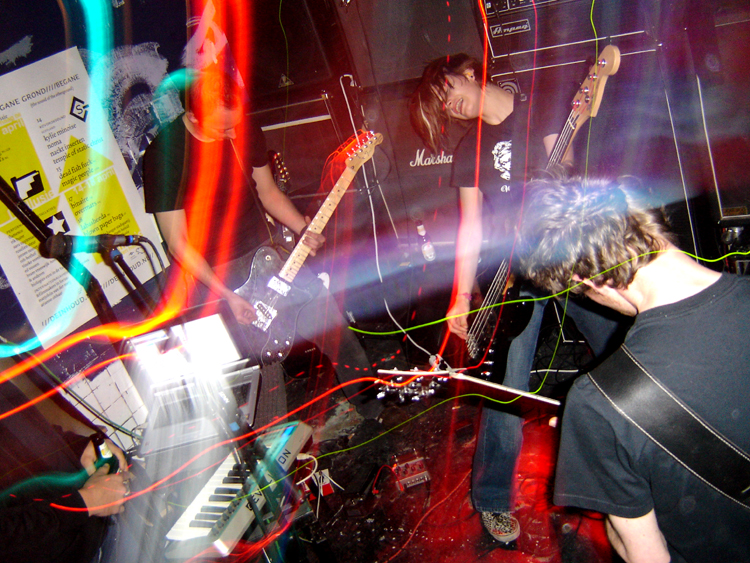
- Overmars in 2006

Background information
- Origin: Lyon, France
- Genres: Post-metal
- Years active: 2001–2011
- Labels: Candlelight; Appease Me
- Past members: Xavier Théret; Antoine; Pierrick; Marion; Ben; Bruno

Overmars is a French post-metal band, formed in 2001 in Lyon. Consisting of Xavier Théret (vocals), Antoine (guitar), Pierrick (guitar), Marion (bass), Ben (drums) and Bruno (keyboards), the band released its debut album, Affliction, Endocrine... Vertigo in 2005. Overmars released its follow-up, Born Again in 2007. The following year saw the release of another split EP with the band Icos and an EP entitled Büccolision with Kill the Thrill.

Compared to the band Swans, Overmars is noted for its "oppressive, droning, oftentimes sludgy interpretation of the post-metal genre. The band's debut album has been labeled as alternative metal with elements of doom metal, industrial, gothic rock, death metal and black metal. The band's second album, Born Again, is composed of a single 40-minute song and featured on NME's list of "The Twenty Heaviest (Metal) Records of All Time".

== Band members ==
- Xavier Théret – vocals
- Antoine – guitar
- Pierrick – guitar
- Marion – bass
- Ben – drums
- Bruno – keyboards

== Discography ==
Studio albums

- Affliction, Endocrine... Vertigo (2005)
- Born Again (2007)

Split albums

- In the Arms of Octopus (2002, with Donefor)
- Fugue / Overmars (2003, with Fugue)
- Starkweather / Overmars (2010, with Starkweather)

EPs

- Overmars / Iscariote (2002, with Iscariote)
- The Road to Awe / Far from Home (2008, with Icos)
- Le Complexe Du Choix (2009)
- Büccolision (2008, with Kill the Thrill)
