= Kill the Thrill =

French industrial rock band

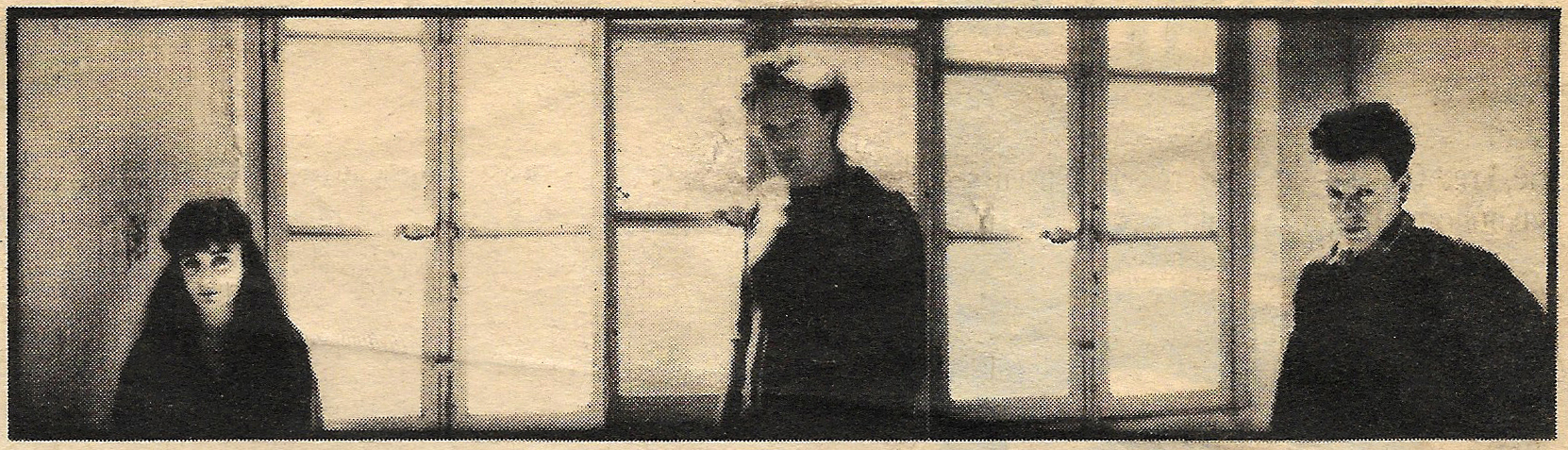
- Kill the Thrill in 1995

Background information
- Origin: Marseille, France
- Genres: Industrial rock; industrial metal
- Years active: 1989–present
- Labels: Atypeek Music; Season of Mist
- Members: Marylin Tognolli; Nicolas Dick; Frédéric De Benedetti
- Past members: Thierry Ringelstein; Patrick Allard; Erikm; Leon
- Website: killthethrill.free.fr

Kill the Thrill is a French industrial rock/metal band formed in Marseille in 1989. The band consists of Nicolas Dick (lead vocals, guitar, programming), Marylin Tognolli (bass, programming, vocals), and Frédéric De Benedetti (guitar, vocals).

Generally associated with the industrial music movement, the band has dabbled with a variety of sounds during its career, ranging from alternative rock, to ambient goth, to darker new wave, and heavy metal. The band's musical eclecticism led to a cult following among its selective audience. The band has cited Killing Joke, Godflesh, Swans and The Young Gods as influences. During its career, Kill the Thrill has also released records sporadically, including Dig (1993), Low (1996), 203 Barriers (2003), and Tellurique (2005). Their third album, 203 Barriers, featured contributions from Michael Gira of Swans. The band's first studio album in 19 years, Autophagie, was released on January 26, 2024.

Kill the Thrill also performed as a supporting act for bands such as Killing Joke, The Young Gods, Einstürzende Neubauten and Treponem Pal.

== Members ==
Current members

- Nicolas Dick – lead vocals, guitar, programming
- Marylin Tognolli – bass, programming, vocals
- Frédéric De Benedetti – guitar, vocals

Past members

- Thierry Ringelstein – guitar
- Patrick Allard – guitar
- ERikm – guitar
- Leon – guitar

== Discography ==
=== Studio albums ===
- Dig (1993)
- Low (1996)
- 203 Barriers (2001)
- Tellurique (2005)
- Autophagie (2024)

=== EPs ===
- Pit (1993)

=== Splits ===
- Les Enfants du Mistral (1990, E.P.) Taktik Mag
- Untitled (1997, with Münch)
- "Büccolision" (2008, with Overmars)

=== Covers ===
- 2005 : "Us and Them" (Godflesh) Tellurique CD
- 2008 : "A Strange Day" (The Cure) "Feardrop" released

=== Demos ===
- 1989 (2015)
