= Les Goodson =

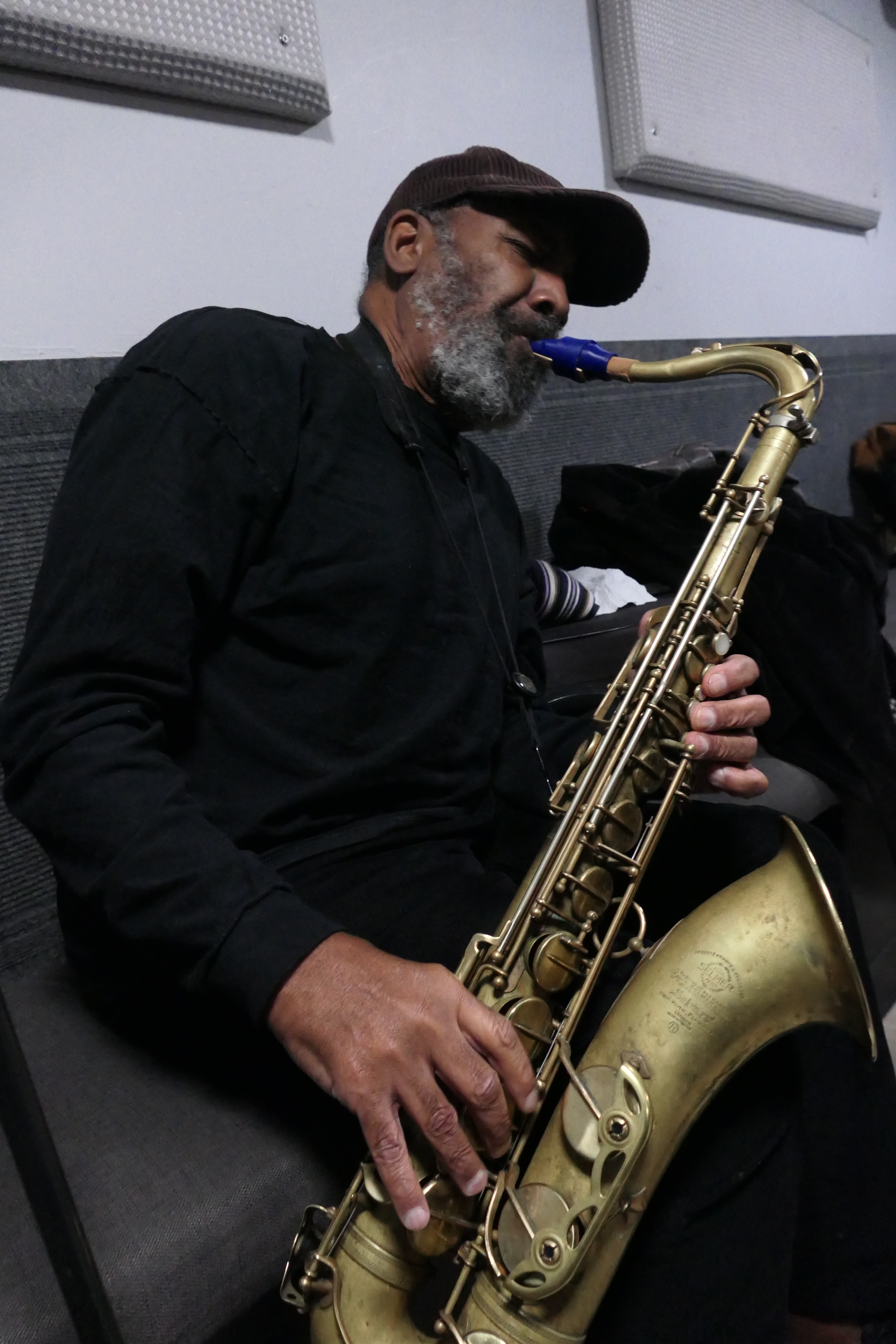
- Goodson in March 2025

Les Goodson (born Ervin Lester Goodson) is a New York City based saxophone player. He has played with William Hooker and Sun Ra. He is also known for his involvement with the civil rights movement.

Goodson was admitted to Columbia University in 1969 as part of a record number of black students that year. He graduated in 1973. As of 2019, he supports himself using many sources of income, including busking and playing gigs. He played on William Hooker’s first album.
