= Starkweather (band) =

American metal band

- Origin: Philadelphia, Pennsylvania, U.S.
- Genres: Metalcore; avant-garde metal
- Years active: 1989–present
- Labels: Candlelight, Deathwish, Inc.
- Members: Rennie Resmini; Todd Forkin; Harry Rosa; Vincent Rosa; Sean Jacobs; Bill Molchanow
- Past members: Michelle Eddison; Sean Roberts; Jim Winters; Liam Wilson

Starkweather is an American heavy metal band from Philadelphia formed in 1989. They have a complex experimental metal sound often including use of dissonance, intricate tempo changes and avant-garde sensibilities. Starkweather helped pioneer the hardcore punk/heavy metal crossover sound that would later be known as "metalcore", as well as being a major influence on the mathcore subgenre. They have influenced many of today's top selling hardcore/metal bands such as Converge, The Dillinger Escape Plan, Mastodon and Coalesce among many others.

The name Starkweather is taken from Charles Starkweather, a late-1950s spree killer.

== Biography ==
After recording a demo at Why Me? Recording (Turning Point, Edgewise, Brody), the band was quickly signed to Harvcore Records and released the Crossbearer LP in 1992. Starkweather made an impression with a succession of 7-inch single releases. These were followed by their first EP, Starkweather, for Inner Rage Records (1993); the Crossbearer re-issue, for Too Damn Hype (1994); their second full-length effort, Into the Wire, on Edison Recordings (1995); and the 1996 Bitter Frost / Bee Stings and Poison Eggs split with Season to Risk through Supermodel Records.

Starkweather released their third album, Croatoan, in late 2005. It was produced by Pierre Remillard (mainly known for producing Canadian death metal bands Cryptopsy and Gorguts), and was released only on vinyl through Hypertension Records. In that year, the band went on their first international European tour, visiting the Netherlands, Germany, Belgium, England and France. 2006 saw the CD release of Croatoan on Candlelight Records. Croatoan features session work from bass player Liam Wilson (The Dillinger Escape Plan and Burnside) and guitarist Jim Winters (Believer, Earth Crisis, Turmoil, and The Promise) and the cover art was done by artist Paul Romano, who also worked with Mastodon, The Red Chord, Trivium, Earth, and Godflesh. After a period of inactivity, Starkweather's fourth LP This Sheltering Night was released in 2010, followed by a split LP with French band Overmars in 2011. Both recordings were produced by Alap Momin (Dälek). Following those releases the band had some line-up changes, with founding guitarist Todd Forkin and longtime drummer Harry Rosa leaving the band. The last recordings with Forkin and Rosa were released in 2018 as a split LP with Portuguese band Concealment.

== Style and influences ==
Starkweather songs do not follow traditional verse-chorus-verse structure. Songs tend to have "narrative or cinematic flow", the compositions tend to emphasize an ongoing development of themes and motifs. Alex Henderson of Allmusic has described their music as "dissonant, jagged, angular, and discordant as well as abrasive, noisy, violent, claustrophobic, and dense" and an "extreme sensory assault". The band has an unusual and eclectic panel of influences; tapping into the more experimental, angular sides of hardcore and metal spheres as well as other genres. Singer Rennie Resmini's main vocal influences are Sinéad O'Connor, Diamanda Galas, Björk, Michael Gira (Swans), Nick Cave (The Birthday Party), Rob 'The Baron' Miller (Amebix), and Jaz Coleman (Killing Joke) among others. The band have acknowledged that some of their primary musical influences include Voivod, Celtic Frost, Gorguts, Articles of Faith, Watchtower, Metallica, Atheist, Minor Threat, Confessor, Morbid Angel, Prong, Fates Warning and Iron Maiden; and have also shown appreciation for avant-garde composers such as Xenakis and Penderecki.

Along with bands like Rorschach, Earth Crisis, Merauder and Integrity, Starkweather is often credited as an early pioneer of the metalcore genre; although the band members do not consider themselves a metalcore band and have shown discontentment with the term. In an interview with Noisecreep, guitarist Todd Forkin commented negatively on the genre, stating, "I've heard the tag on a number of occasions that we, along with a handful of other bands, are responsible for metalcore, but to me that's like being told you're responsible for spreading cancer. You just pray that it's not true." Forkin continued in the interview that he does not hear "a direct take on what we've done" in modern metalcore bands.

In a review for Starkweather's This Sheltering Night, Cosmo Lee of Decibel wrote, "If one had to assign a context for Starkweather, it would be the late '80s/early '90s, where bands like Only Living Witness and Prong were smashing together metal and hardcore—but not quite making 'metalcore.' 'Metalcore' now implies the worst of both worlds. We're talking about the best of both worlds."

Starkweather's musical contemporaries include a handful of 1990s hardcore groups that fused dissonant and melodic elements in an unorthodox, complex manner (Stigmata, Only Living Witness and Sam Black Church); as well as bands like Rorschach, Deadguy, Bloodlet and Converge, who played a similarly angular and unusual style of metallic hardcore.

== Members ==
Current members

- Rennie Resmini – vocals (1989–present)
- Vincent Rosa – bass guitar (2005–present)
- Jim Winters – guitar (2002-2005, 2014–present)
- Drew Juergens-Soto – drums (2016–present)
- Sean Jacobs – bass guitar (2014–present)
- Bill Molchanow – guitar (2016–present)

Former members

- Todd Forkin – guitar (1989-2014)
- Harry Rosa – drums (1990-2014)
- Michelle Eddison – bass guitar (1990–1999)
- Sean Roberts – guitar (?)
- Dan McGinnis – guitar (1990)
- Liam Wilson – bass guitar (2002-2005)
- Leonard Emerick – drums (1989-1990)

== Discography ==
- Crossbearer (LP) (1992) Harvcore Records
- Starkweather (7-inch EP) (1993) Inner Rage Records, France
- Philly Dust Krew compilation cd (1993) Too Damn Hype Records
- Crossbearer (studio album, 1994) re-issue of vinyl with bonus tracks on Too Damn Hype Records
- A Food Not Bombs Benefit compilation LP (1994) Inchworm Records
- Into The Wire (studio album, 1995) Edison Records
- Bitter Frost/Bee Stings and Poison Eggs (split with Season to Risk, 1996)
- Definitely Not the Majors compilation CD (1997) Bush League
- Croatoan (studio, 2005) vinyl by Hypertension CD released by Candlelight Records in 2006
- This Sheltering Night (studio, 2010) CD LP released by Deathwish Inc.
- "Split" Starkweather & Overmars LP released by Deathwish Inc.
- Starkweather / Concealment split (2018, Translation Loss Records)
