= This Sheltering Night =

Studio album by Starkweather
- Released: May 25, 2010
- Recorded: 2007
- Genre: Avant-garde metal, metalcore
- Length: 62:26
- Label: Deathwish (DWI101)
- Producer: Alap Momim

Starkweather chronology
Croatoan (2005)	This Sheltering Night (2010)

This Sheltering Night is the fourth studio album released by experimental metal band Starkweather. The album was released on May 25, 2010 through Deathwish Inc.

The album is the result of several studio sessions, featuring some reworked tracks from Starkweather's recording sessions for their 2005 album Croatoan. The opening track "Epiphany" dates back to live performances in the late 1990s. This Sheltering Night was completed in 2008, however Starkweather had to wait til 2010 to terminate their contract with Candlelight Records before they could switch to their current label Deathwish Inc and finally release the album. This album is the first Starkweather recording with bassist Vincent Rosa, and features extensive lead guitar work by frequent collaborator Bill Molchanow as well as soundscape interludes by producer Oktopus (Alap Momin from Dälek) and Liz Jacobs (Sophia Perennis).

Professional ratings
Review scores
Source	Rating
Bring on Mixed Reviews	(4.75/5)
Decibel	(9/10)
Decoy Music	4.5/5 stars
Hearwax	(9.2/10)
LambGoat	(8/10)
Scene Point Blank	(8/10)

== Track listing ==
1. "Epiphany" – 7:20
2. "Swarm" – 3:37
3. "Broken From Inside" – 9:50
4. "Transmit" – 1:52
5. "All Creatures Damned and Divine (Inducing Motion Sickness)" – 8:43
6. "One Among Vermin" – 7:57
7. "Receive" – 2:55
8. "Bustuari" – 5:54
9. "Proliferate" – 2:25
10. "Martyring" – 7:53
11. "The End of All Things" – 4:00

== Personnel ==
Starkweather

- Todd Forkin – guitar
- Rennie Resmini – vocals
- Harry Rosa – drums, percussion
- Vince Rosa – bass guitar

Artwork and design

- Mikio Murakami – artwork

Additional musicians

- Bill Molchanow – lead guitars
- Forbes Graham (Kayo Dot) – trumpet, euphonium
- Oktopus (Dälek) – soundscapes
- Elizabeth Jacobs (Sophia Perennis) – soundscapes

Production and recording

- Alan Douches – mastering
- Alap Momin – recording, engineer, mixing
