= William Hooker (musician) =

American drummer and composer (born 1946)

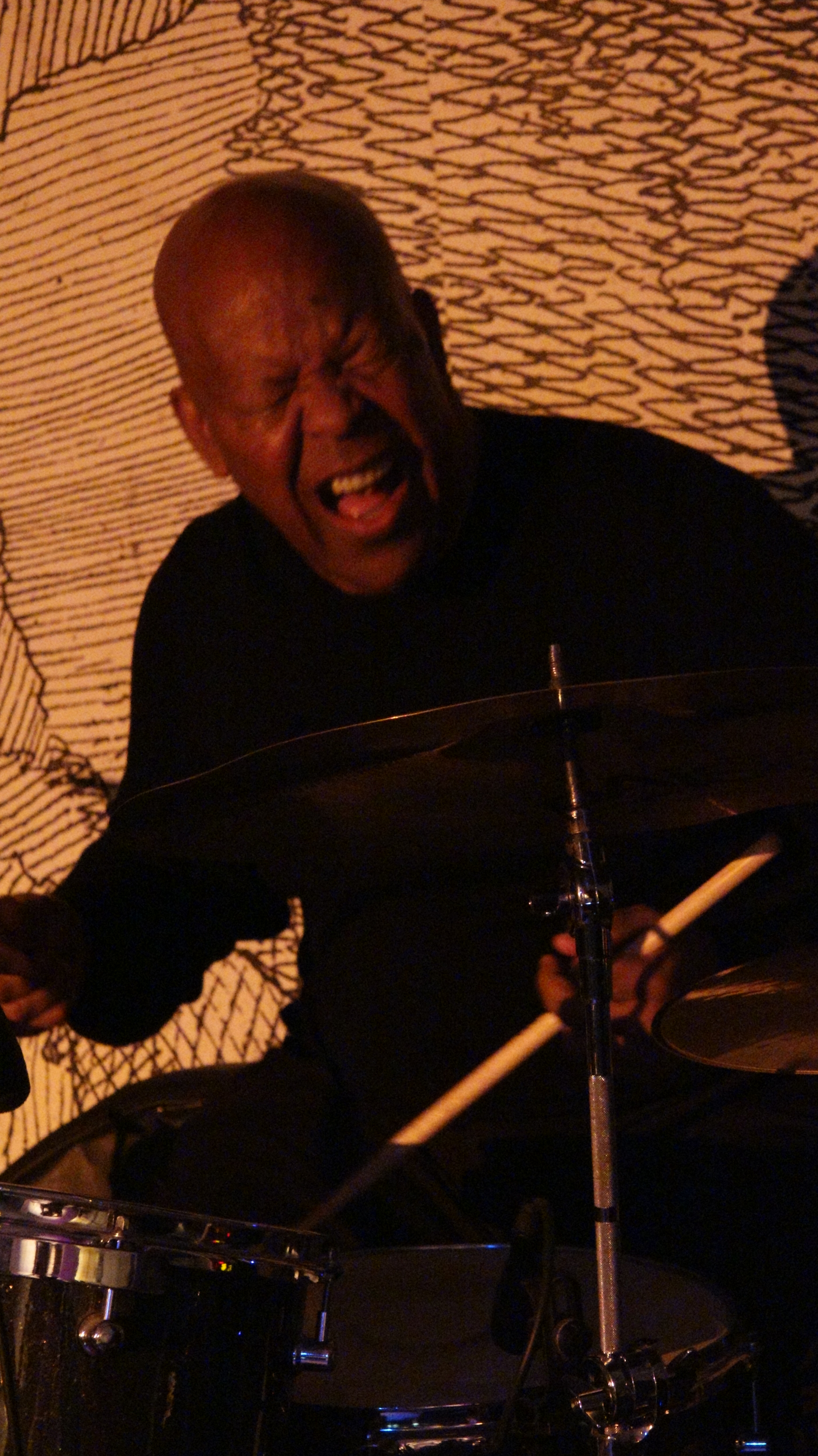

Background information
- Born: June 18, 1946 (age 80); New Britain, Connecticut, U.S.
- Genres: Jazz, free jazz
- Instruments: Drums

William Hooker (born June 18, 1946) is an American drummer and composer.

== Early life and education ==
Hooker was born in New Britain, Connecticut, on June 18, 1946. He began to play the drums at the age of 12. In high school, he played in a rock band, then switched to jazz. After graduating from Central Connecticut College, Hooker moved to California and became interested in free jazz.

== Career ==
Hooker moved to New York City in the mid-1970s and was part of the loft jazz scene, playing with musicians such as saxophonists David Murray and David S. Ware. His first recording as a leader was in 1976. His music was too radical to be commercially successful, and Hooker took other jobs to earn a living. This changed after he received praise for a 1988 recording, and he made frequent appearances at the Knitting Factory from early the following decade. Hooker was a founding member of the Text of Light, a musician's collective that released seven albums between 2004 and 2010.

Hooker has led several bands, including a drums–trumpet–saxophone trio and an organ trio. They usually do not feature a bass, "because of the intensity and volume of his drumming". He has also been the drummer in duos with guitarists, including Elliott Sharp and Thurston Moore. Hooker's playing and recordings have embraced a wide range and combination of musics, including free jazz, noise rock, electronics, contemporary classical, and experimental electronic.

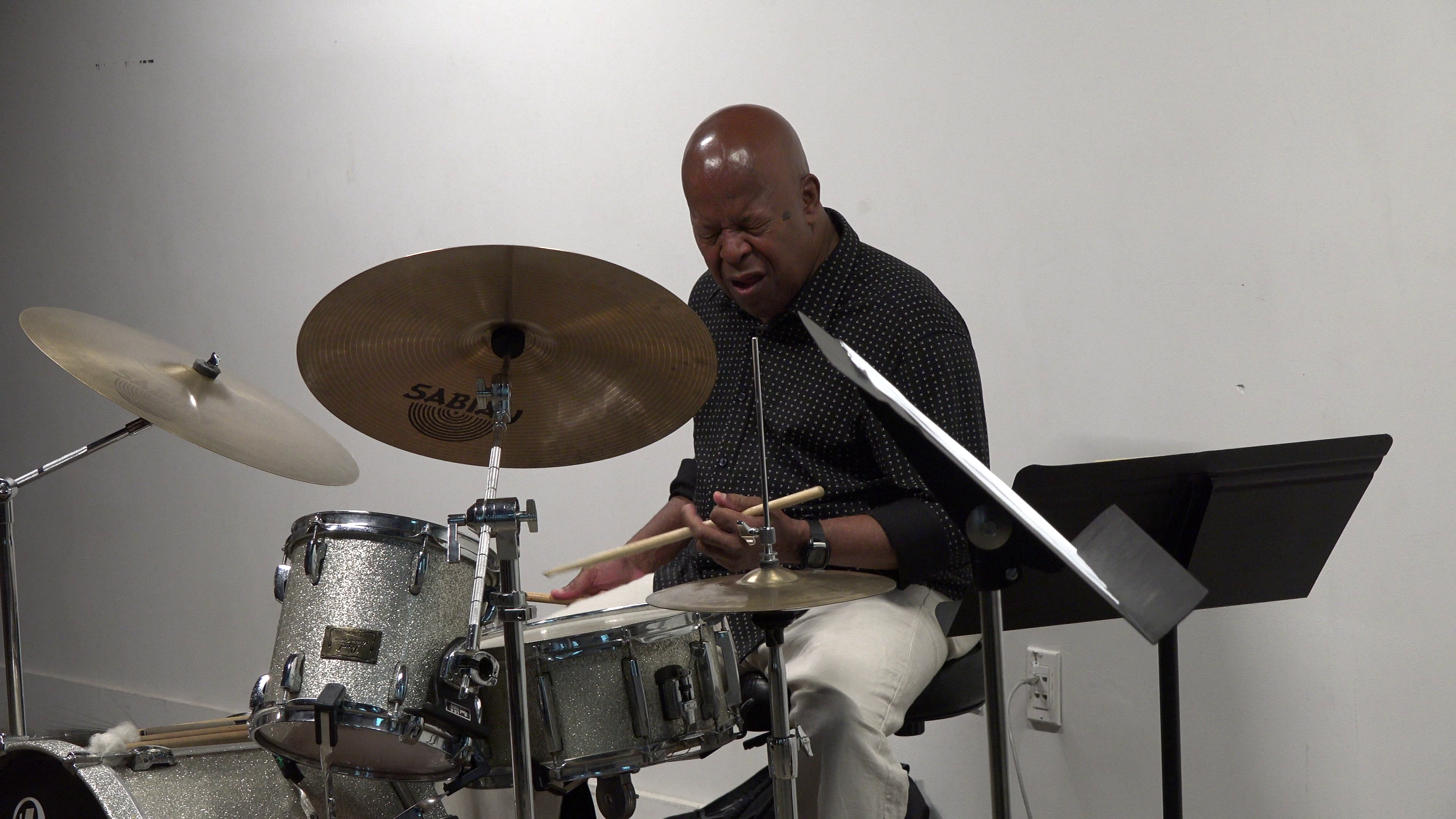
William Hooker in 2023

The Down Beat reviewer of Hooker's Symphonie Of Flowers album wrote "Hooker uses history to enliven a suite of music that bounds through subgenres and percussive ideas".

"He is an elemental drummer of considerable force, equally at home in free-form jazz and avant-garde rock circles; he also experiments with electronics and turntables".

== Discography ==
- ...Is Eternal Life (Reality Unit Concepts 1977) - featuring David Murray, Mark Miller, David S. Ware, Hasaan Dawkins, and Les Goodson
- Brighter Lights (Reality Unit Concepts 1986)
- Lifeline (Silkheart Records 1988) - William Hooker Quartet featuring Alan Michael, Claude Lawrence, William Parker, Mark Hennen, Charles Compo, Masahiko Kono
- The Firmament Fury (Silkheart 1989) - William Hooker Ensemble featuring Claude Lawrence, Charles Compo, Masahiko Kono, Donald Miller
- Shamballa: Duets with Thurston Moore and Elliott Sharp (Knitting Factory Works 1993; reissued on double vinyl LP by Org Music, 2023)
- Envisioning (Knitting Factory Works 1994) - William Hooker and Lee Ranaldo
- Radiation (Positive Music 1994) - featuring Donald Miller, Brian Doherty, Charles Compo, Masahiko Kono
- Armageddon (Homestead 1995)
- Gift of Tongues (1995) - featuring Lee Ranaldo and Zeena Parkins
- Joy (Within)! (Silkheart 1996) - William Hooker - Billy Bang Duo
- Heat of the Light (Dream Sequences) (Rabid God Inoculator 1996) - Solo
- Tibet (Ummo 1996) - featuring Mark Hennen, Charles Compo, Donald Miller
- Mindfulness (Knitting Factory Works 1997) - featuring DJ Olive and Glenn Spearman
- The Distance Between Us (Knitting Factory Works 1999)
- Bouquet: Live at the Knitting Factory 4.23.99 (Knitting Factory Works 2000) - Christian Marclay and Lee Ranaldo
- Hard Time (Squealer 2001) - featuring Jesse Henry, Richard Keene, Donald Miller, Doug Walker
- Black Mask (Knitting Factory Works 2002) - Duets with Andrea Parkins, Jason Hwang, Roy Nathanson
- Out Trios, Vol. 1: Monsoon (Atavistic 2003) - featuring Roger Miller and Lee Ranaldo
- Yearn for Certainty (2010) - featuring Sabir Mateen and Dave Soldier
- Crossing Points (2011) - featuring Thomas Chapin
- William Hooker Duo featuring Mark Hennen (2012)
- A Postcard From the Road (2012) - featuring Edward Ricart and Dave Ross
- Channels of Consciousness (2012) - featuring Adam Lane, Dave Ross, Chris DiMeglio, and Sanga
- Heart of the Sun (2013) - featuring Roy Campbell and Dave Soldier
- Red (Atypeek Music 2015) - William Hooker Quartet featuring Matt Lavelle, Mark Hennen, Larry Roland and William Hooker
- Aria (Multatta Records 2016) - featuring Dave Soldier, On Davis, Mark Hennan, Richard Keene, and Louie Belogenis
- Pillars ... at the Portal (Multatta Records 2018) – featuring Jon Irabagon, James Brandon Lewis, Luke Stewart, and Anthony Pirog
- Remembering (Astral Spirits 2018) - William Hooker Trio featuring Ava Mendoza and Damon Smith
- Symphonie of Flowers (Org Music, 2019)
- Cycle of Restoration (FPE, 2019) - featuring Mark Kirschenmann and Joel Peterson
- Full On! (2019) - Duos with Mark Kirschenmann, featuring guest Marcus Elliot
- Nels Cline, Alan Licht & William Hooker Live (2020)
- Big Moon (Org Music, 2021)
- Flesh And Bones (Org Music, 2023)
- Jubilation (Org Music, 2025)
- A Time Within: Live at the New Your Jazz Museum, January 14, 1977 (Valley of Search, 2025)
