= Enablers (band) =

American post-punk band

- Origin: San Francisco, California, United States
- Genres: Post-punk, spoken word, post-rock, experimental rock
- Years active: 2002 – present
- Labels: Neurot, Atypeek Music, Lancashire and Somerset, Exile on Mainstream, Broken Clover Records, Wrong Speed Records
- Members: Kevin Thomson; Joe Goldring; Pete Simonelli; Sam Ospovat
- Past members: Yuma Joe Byrnes; Doug Scharin; Neil Turpin
- Website: enablers.bandcamp.com

Enablers are a post-punk band formed in San Francisco, California which features the poetry/spoken word of Pete Simonelli. The current members now mostly exist on opposite sides of the American coasts.

== History ==
In addition to Simonelli, a published poet and writer who was working as a courier in the band's early years, the band's lineup was initially Joe Goldring (guitar, formerly of Swans, Toiling Midgets and [concurrent with Enablers] Touched by a Janitor), Kevin Thomson (guitar, Timco, Nice Strong Arm, Morning Champ, and [also concurrent with Enablers] Touched by a Janitor), and Yuma Joe Byrnes (drums, ex-Tarnation / Broken Horse, Touched by a Janitor).

Enablers' first album, End Note, was released on Neurot Recordings in 2004. In 2006 they released their second LP Output Negative Space, (described by PopMatters as having "a swagger that seems almost malevolent",) and a split single with the band Redpanda.

In 2007 they released the single-sided one track twelve-inch single "The Achievement" through Awesome Vistas, which also appeared in abbreviated form on the follow-up album, Tundra, in 2008, a shared release between Lancashire and Somerset, Majic Wallet, and Exile on Mainstream. In 2009 the band released Now You Can Answer My Prayers as a 10" vinyl-only EP, again through Lancashire and Somerset.

After a short hiatus, following the departure of Joe Byrnes, Doug Scharin (formerly of Codeine, HiM, June of 44, Rex, and Mice Parade) joined the band as drummer for the recording of the album Blown Realms And Stalled Explosions (released in 2011) and for subsequent tours.

As of 2013 the band has toured and recorded with a new drummer, Sam Ospovat (Beep, Naytronix, Timosaurus, Anteater, Passwords, CavityFang, Kapowski and PIKI). Enablers' 2015 album, The Rightful Pivot, was released on the Atypeek Music, Lancashire and Somerset, and Exile on Mainstream labels, and was supported by European tours. Ospovat has remained as a drummer and composer through Enablers' last two releases, Zones (2019—Lancashire and Somerset/Exile on Mainstream/Broken Clover) and Pigeon Diaries (2020—Lancashire and Somerset/Exile on Mainstream/Broken Clover).

== Discography ==
=== Albums ===
- End Note (2004), Neurot
- Output Negative Space (2006), Neurot/Lancashire and Somerset/Human Worth
- Tundra (2008), Atypeek Music/Lancashire and Somerset/Majic Wallet/Exile on Mainstream
- Blown Realms And Stalled Explosions (2011), Lancashire and Somerset/Exile on Mainstream
- The Rightful Pivot (2015), Atypeek Music/Lancashire and Somerset/Exile on Mainstream
- Zones (2019), Broken Clover Records/Lancashire and Somerset/Exile on Mainstream
- Some Gift (2022), Wrong Speed Records

=== Compilation ===
- Almost to Who Knows Where (2023), Atypeek Music

=== Singles, EPs ===
- Enablers/Redpanda Split 7" (2007), Lancashire and Somerset
- The Achievement 12" (2007), Awesome Vistas
- Now You Can Answer My Prayers 10" (2009), Lancashire and Somerset
- Berlinesque (2014), Bandcamp Digital
- Pigeon Diaries 12" (2020), Broken Clover Records/Lancashire and Somerset/Exile on Mainstream
