= Devonshire Arms =

Common English pub name

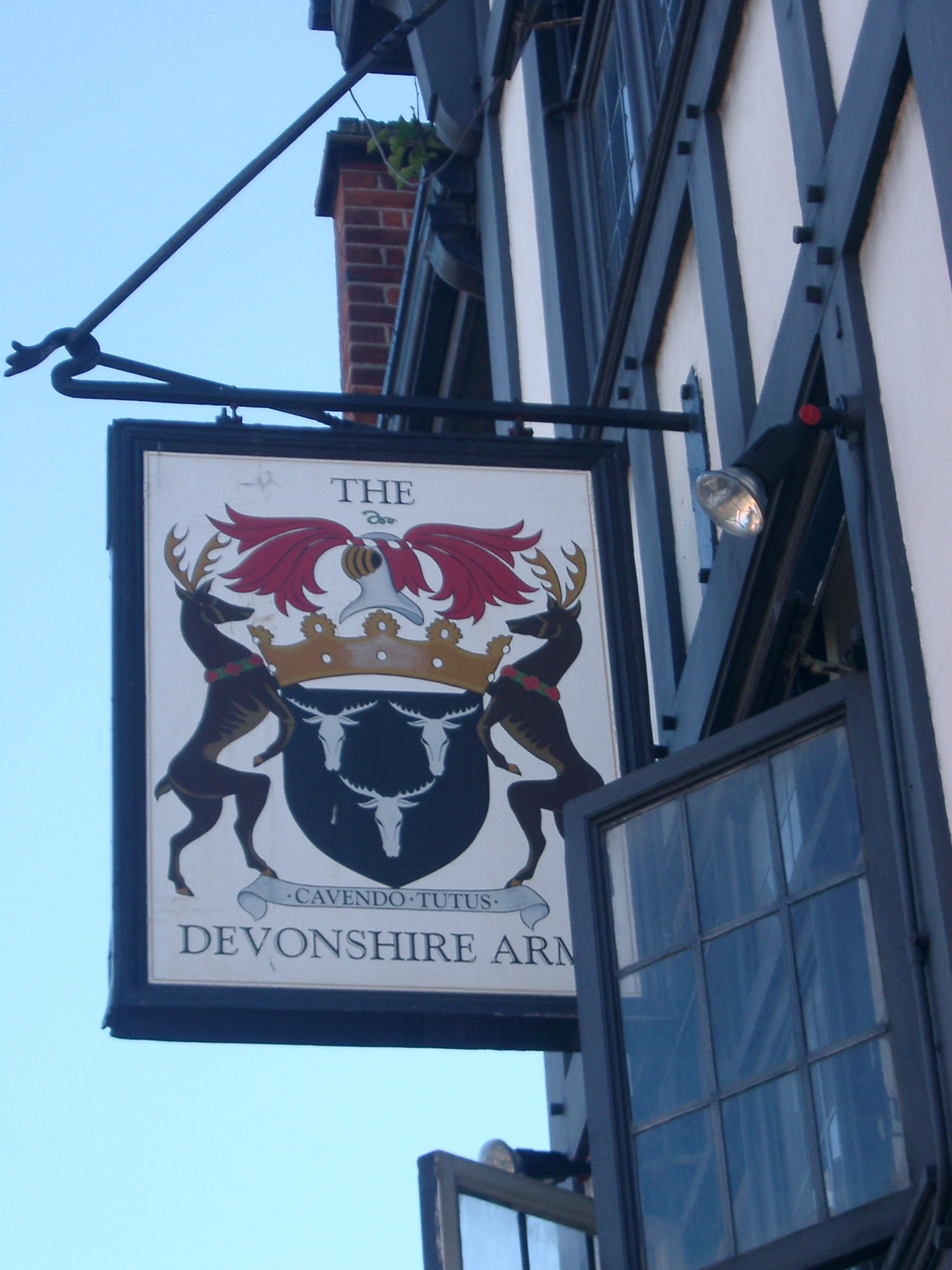
Devonshire Arms pub sign in July 2006, featuring the punning Latin inscription "Cavendo tutus" ("I should/must beware all"), alluding to the Devonshire / Cavendish family

The Devonshire Arms is a moderately common name for an English pub. The name is for the Dukes of Devonshire, members of the peerage from a wealthy aristocratic family.

== Etymology ==
The name attributes the Duke (and often his wife the Duchess) of Devonshire, a peerage which is today the main peerage held by a Cavendish (the ducal titles of Portland and Newcastle being extinct). Wherever they held much land or contributed to a local vestry or other charity, as at Chatsworth, Derbyshire and in Chiswick, London (formerly Middlesex) are often Cavendish Arms – and later titular Devonshire Arms – pubs and street names

At Chatsworth the pub name "The Snake" refers to the family's coat of arms; as does the Snake Inn, a coaching inn on the old turnpike road on the Snake Pass in the Peak District of Derbyshire

== Pubs ==
=== London ===
The Devonshire Arms in Kensington (37 Marloes Road) is a Victorian era pub built in 1865 with a traditional beer garden. It housed local ARP wardens during The Blitz.

The "Duke of Devonshire" in Balham High Road is a Victorian era corner pub with traditional pub glasswork from the late 1890s, included "an impressive, mirrored bar-back" with original counter and wooden panelling.

The mock Tudor Devonshire Arms in Camden, also known as "The Dev" or by its previous name The Hobgoblin, is said to be "London's most famous alternative venue". It was the first Goth subculture pub in Camden. It is the longest-surviving Goth pub in London and is a focus for the city's alternative scene. During the 1980s, Spider Stacy and Shane MacGowan of the Pogues frequented the pub. The interior featured in "Goths", an episode from a 2003 BBC anthology series, Spine Chillers.

The Devonshire Arms in Chiswick's Devonshire Road (also named for William Cavendish, 4th Duke of Devonshire) is a gastropub, formerly known as the Manor Tavern. The current building dates from 1924, but a pub already existed on the site in 1888.

The Devonshire Arms in Soho stood from 1793 to 2012, in 2023, a pub called The Devonshire opened in the same building.

=== North Yorkshire ===
In Skipton, North Yorkshire, the three storey stone-built pub named for the Duke of Devonshire is known simply as "The Devonshire". It was once called "The New Inn".

=== Derbyshire ===
In Derbyshire, where the family has its great house at Chatsworth, there are Devonshire Arms pubs at Baslow, Beeley, and Pilsley, the last two both on the estate.
