= Tellurique =

Studio album by Kill the Thrill
- Released: 17 May 2005
- Genre: Industrial rock; industrial metal; post-metal; noise rock; coldwave
- Length: 69:10
- Label: Season of Mist
- Producer: Nicolas Dick

Kill the Thrill chronology
203 Barriers (2003)	Tellurique (2005)

Tellurique is the fourth studio album by French industrial rock music group Kill the Thrill. It was released on 17 May 2005 through the record label Season of Mist.

== Musical style ==
Like Kill the Thrill's overall sound, Tellurique draws influences from various genres, including heavy metal, new wave, ambient goth, alternative rock and industrial music. Featuring frontman Nicolas Dick's occasionally low and effect-laden deadpan vocals, the album consists of "down-tempo, brooding, lyric-driven songs" and atmospheric compositions typical of progressive rock and space rock styles. In terms of atmosphere and compositions, the tracks on the album were compared to the works of Killing Joke, Joy Division, Nine Inch Nails, Isis and Voivod.

== Critical reception ==
Professional ratings
Review scores
Source	Rating
AllMusic	3/5 stars

Eduardo Rivadavia of AllMusic praised the album's eclectic style, describing it as "too sparse for metal, too morbid for new wave, too humanized for industrial, and definitely too alternative for alternative rock." Nevertheşless, Rivadavia further added that the record's "strange creative pathways may prove too broad, or too vague, to make a connection with their limited tastes of the fans of the other different musical styles, co-signing the French trio to once again appeal to just a very small and selective, but open-minded, fan base." Exclaim! magazine critic Monica S. Kuebler stated: "Atmospheric and unhappy, Kill the Thrill's fifth release is not entirely fulfilling; it seems for each track that really hits home there is one that misses or feels like filler." Kuebler eventually concluded her review with "an 'A for effort and for those moments where the genre cliché is challenged, but a hard-earned 'C for the final product."

== Track listing ==
All songs are written by Nicolas Dick and Kill the Thrill, except where noted.

1. "A Little Star for a Better Feeling" – 6:08
2. "Permanent Imbalance" – 6:42
3. "An Indefinite Direction" – 6:50
4. "Non Existence" – 4:54
5. "Soave" – 5:37
6. "Like Cement" – 5:09
7. "Diaphragme" – 6:36
8. "Head" – 4:03
9. "Body" – 5:55
10. "Mistaken Solutions" – 6:36
11. "Us and Them" (Godflesh cover) – 5:35
12. "The Finish" – 5:05

== Personnel ==
Album personnel as adapted from album liner notes.

Kill the Thrill

- Marylin Tognolli – bass guitar, vocals
- Nicolas Dick – guitar, vocals, electronics, drum programming, recording, mixing, production
- Frédéric De Benedetti – guitar, vocals

Other personnel

- Solenn Risset – saxophone
- Anouk Ricard – backing vocals
- Jérôme Cros – artwork
