= The Devonshire, London =

Pub in London, England

Coordinates: 51.5107°N 0.1354°W

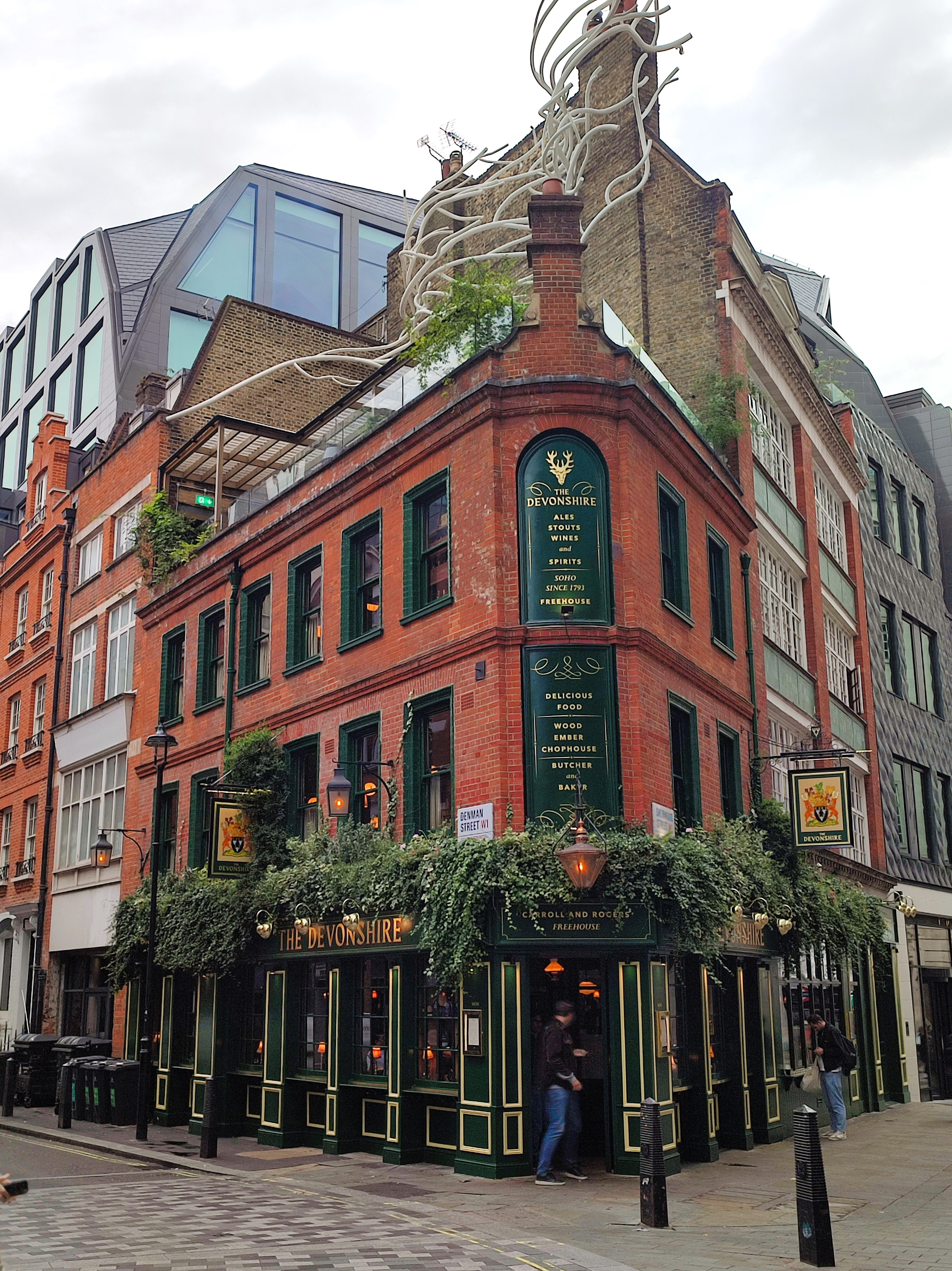
The Devonshire in 2025

The Devonshire is a pub on Denman Street at the southern end of Soho in London. It was opened in 2023 on the site of a pub known as the Devonshire Arms which had existed there from 1793 to 2012.

Shortly after opening, the pub became noted for the quality of food served, Grace Dent praised the pub's "comfort food" in The Guardian. In 2025, it was listed by the Michelin Guide as one of the best traditional British restaurants in London. In 2026, The Devonshire was claimed to be the number one gastropub by the Estrella Damm sponsored list of the Top 50 Gastropubs.
