= Wisp discography =

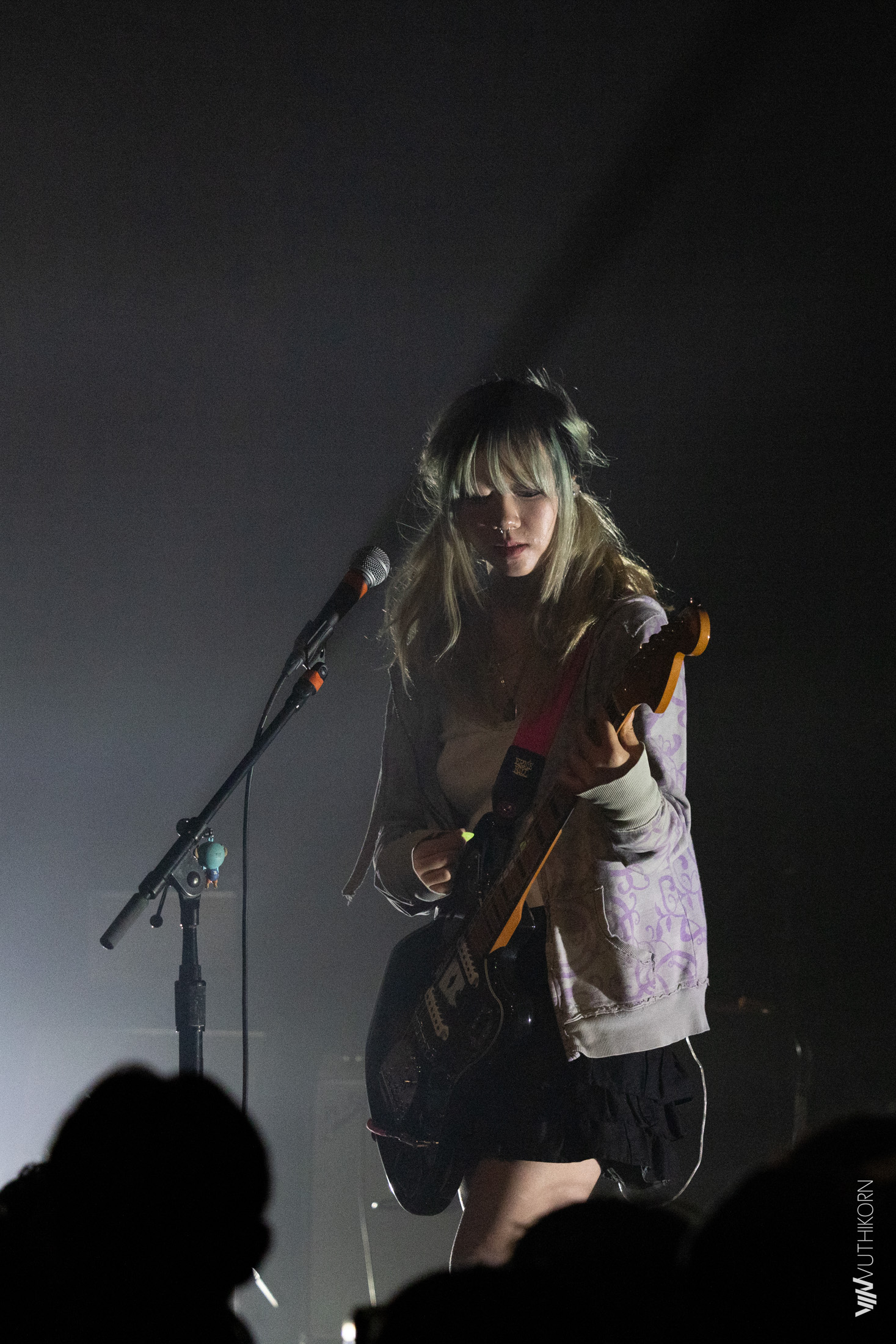
- Studio albums: 1
- EPs: 1
- Singles: 12
- Music videos: 4

The American musician Wisp has released one studio album, one extended play (EP), twelve singles, and four music videos. As a teenager, she attended Wallenberg High School, where she drew musical inspiration from her modern band class. Wisp was a computer science major in San Francisco State University before starting her musical career.

She released her debut and breakout single, "Your Face" in April 2023 The song would later gain significant traction online, and peak at number 8 on Billboard's Hot Hard Rock Songs chart for 15 weeks straight. The music video for the song was released in November 2023, with the main setting based underwater. Her extended play Pandora in April 2024, as well as her debut studio album If Not Winter in August 2025, were released under Interscope Records. She featured on Photographic Memory's single "Heartstyle", from his album I Look at Her and Light Goes All Through Me.

== Albums ==
=== Studio albums ===
Title	Details	Peak chart positions
Title	Details	US Current Albums
If Not Winter	Released: August 1, 2025; Label: Music Soup, Interscope; Format: LP, CD, digital download, streaming	37

== Extended plays ==
Title	Details
Pandora	Released: April 5, 2024; Label: Music Soup, Interscope; Format: LP, CD, digital download, streaming

== Singles ==
=== As lead artist ===
Title	Year	Peak chart positions	Certifications	Album
Title	Year	US Hard Rock	Certifications	Album
"Your Face"	2023	8	PMB: Gold; RIAA: Gold	Pandora
"Tangled Dreams"	2023	—		Non-album singles
"Once Then We'll Be Free"	2023	—		Non-album singles
"See You Soon"	2024	—		Pandora
"Enough for You"	2024	—		Pandora
"I Remember How Your Hands Felt on Mine"	2024	—		Non-album single
"Sword"	2025	—		If Not Winter
"Get Back to Me"	2025	—		If Not Winter
"Save Me Now"	2025	—		If Not Winter
"Breathe Onto Me"	2025	—		If Not Winter
"Serpentine"	2025	—		If Not Winter
"Yellow"	2025	—		Non-album single
"—" denotes a recording that did not chart or was not released in that territory.

=== As featured artist ===
Title	Year	Album
"Tomorrow" (Distressor feat. Wisp)	2024	Non-album singles
"Heartstyle" (Photographic Memory feat. Wisp)	2025	I Look at Her and Light Goes All Through Me
"Crocodile Eyes" (Aldn feat. Wisp)	2025	Strung Out Symphony
"Rapture" (Gloom Version) (Touché Amoré feat. Wisp)	2026	Stage Four (10 Year Anniversary Edition)

== Music videos ==
Song	Year	Director	Ref
"Your Face"	2023	Boni Mata & Nick Vernet	
"Pandora"	2023	Sophie Álvarez & Nick Vernet	
"Sword"	2025	Valerie Dziatko & Rudy Grazziani	
"Black Swan"	2025	Claryn Chong	
