= Sword (song) =

2025 song by Wisp

Single by Wisp

from the album If Not Winter
- Released: March 14, 2025
- Genre: Shoegaze; nu gaze
- Length: 2:26
- Label: Music Soup; Interscope
- Songwriters: Natalie Lu; Alden Gardner Robinson; Ajay Bhattacharyya; Gabriel Greenland; Max Epstein
- Producers: Stint; Aldn; Gabe Greenland

Wisp singles chronology
"Tomorrow" (2024)	"Sword" (2025)	"Get Back to Me" (2025)

Music video
- "Sword" on YouTube

"Sword" is a song by the American musician Wisp from her debut studio album, If Not Winter (2025). It was released by Music Soup and Interscope Records on March 14, 2025, as the album's lead single. Wisp wrote the song alongside record producers Stint, Aldn, and Gabe Greenland, with additional songwriting from Gabriel Greenland and record engineer Max Epstein. "Sword" is a shoegaze song with elements of nu gaze built around breathy melodies, soft-brushed snares, and acoustic swirls. It was deemed a standout track from If Not Winter by reviewers; upon release, the song received generally positive reviews from critics. A music video directed by Rudy Grazziani and Valeriya Dyatko had premiered alongside the song's release and depicts Wisp in a medieval-themed setting.

== Background and release ==
Following the virality of her debut single "Your Face," in 2023, Wisp had released her debut extended play (EP), Pandora in April 2024, and announced that she was working on a studio album. She began working on material at home and in Los Angeles, until the EP's release, with two of the album's singles—"Enough For You" and "See You Soon" being written in late 2023. Following a tour in support of the EP in April and May 2024, she began working on her debut album. "Sword" was released on March 14, 2025, through Music Soup and Interscope Records as the lead single and opening track of Wisp's debut studio album, If Not Winter (2025). Wisp discussed the concept of the song, saying that it constituted the shame and confusion people feel when they're hidden from the world by a loved one.

== Production and composition ==
"Sword"
The chorus of "Sword" features an atmospheric fuzzy ambience, with drums, played by Zach Fenton.

The track was written and performed by Wisp, with production handled by Stint, Gabe Greenland, and Aldn. It has a runtime of two minutes and twenty-six seconds, and was created with an electric guitar and drums, Zach Fenton playing the latter and Maximilian Epstein playing the former. The track also carries elements of shoegaze and nu gaze. Alessandra Rin at Ones to Watch wrote that amid "ethereal and distortion-gauzy instrumentation", Wisp "reflects on people getting lost in interpersonal strife". While Melodic Magazine's Kira Imani Andrews said the song introduced listeners to a "mellowed alarm-like melody; complemented by the start of an acoustic guitar". The chorus has percussion that "comes into the mix in the most satisfying, brain-scratching way", alongside a "delicate yet foreboding guitar and bass" taking on a "blizzardy" effect. Lars Stalfors and Ruairi O'Flaherty handled the song's mixing and mastering, respectively.

== Critical reception ==
Upon its release, "Sword" had received positive reviews from music critics. Kieran Press-Reynolds of Pitchfork commented on the song's "cresting grunge-gaze volcanoes." While NME's Kristen S. Hé felt that it had more "precise arrangements", a "much clearer mix" and a chorus that "sets up the album’s emotional stakes". Gregory Adams at Revolver said the song had "ultra-breathy" melodies "above a bedrock of soft-brushed snare hits and acoustic swirls". While the staff at Consequence called it "aggressively pretty" and "dreamlike". John Lonsdale of Rolling Stone had regarded it as one of the standout tracks on If Not Winter.

== Music video ==
Rudy Grazziani and Valeriya Dyatko directed the music video for "Sword" in Latvia, which then premiered on the same day as the song's release. The music video mainly takes place in a medieval-themed setting. Wisp is first spotted close to a palatial building before moving in its direction. She is then shown in a white gown roaming through rural areas and opulent settings with an enigmatic knight. At end of the video, Wisp is shown holding a sword and wearing armor, which Revolver's Gregory Adams had called a "role reversal".

== Personnel ==
Credits are adapted from Tidal and Apple Music.

- Natalie R Lu – vocals, songwriting
- Alden Gardner Robinson – songwriting, production
- Ajay Bhattacharyya – songwriting, production
- Gabriel Greenland – songwriting, production
- Max Epstein – songwriting, electric guitar, recording engineer
- Zach Capitti-Fenton – drums
- George Janho – recording engineer
- Lars Stalfors – mixing engineer
- Ruairi O'Flaherty – mastering engineer
