= Laneway Festival =

Music festival

St. Jerome's Laneway Festival
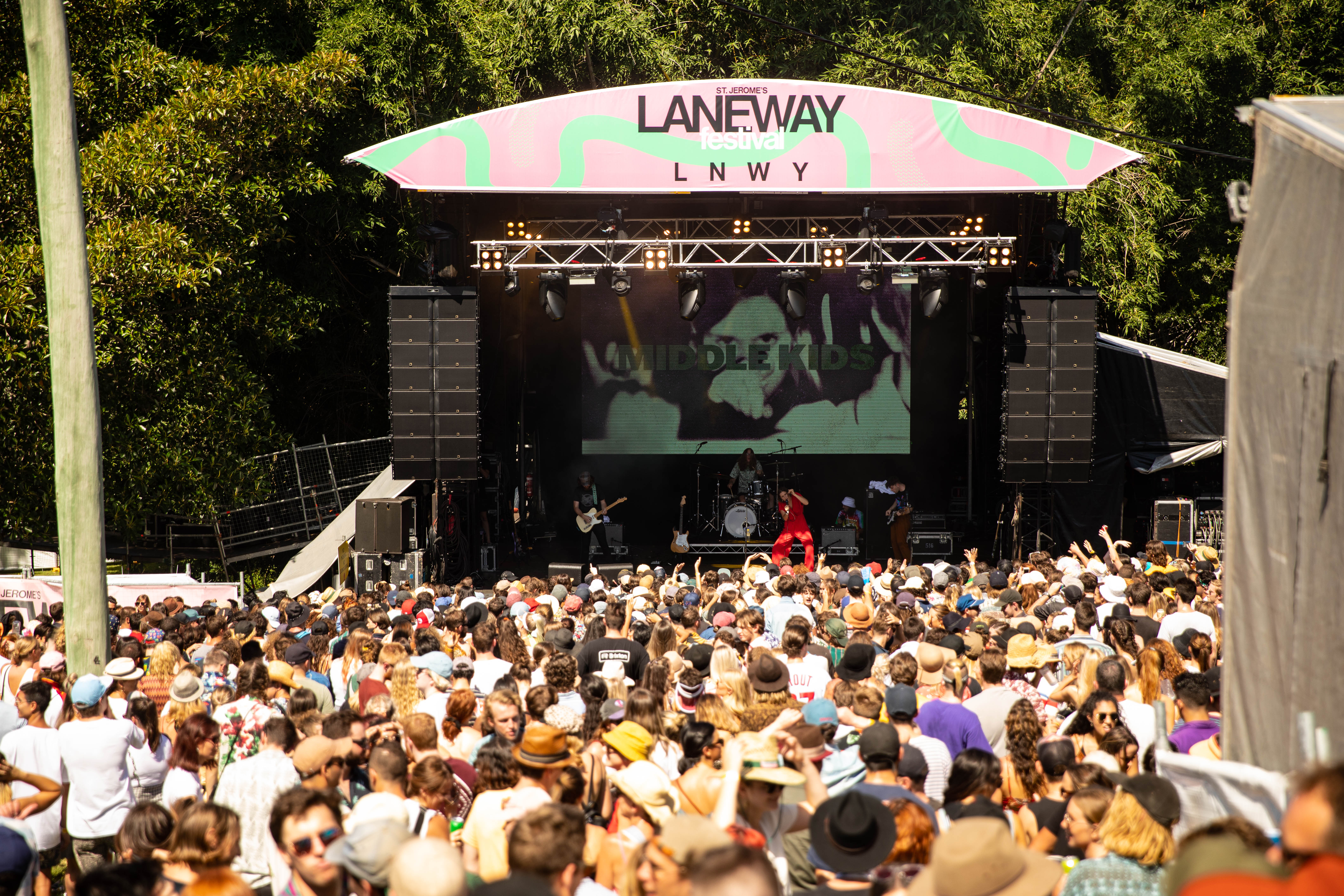
- Laneway Festival in Sydney, 2019
- Nickname: Laneway
- Genre: Indie, Indie pop, Rock
- Dates: Late January – early February
- Locations: Melbourne (2003–2020, 2022–); Sydney (2006–2020, 2022–); Adelaide (2008–2020, 2022–2027); Perth (2009–2020, 2022–2027); Auckland (2010–2020, 2022–); Gold Coast (2026); Brisbane (2007–2020, 2022–2025, 2027 -); Singapore (2011–2018); Detroit (2013)
- Years active: 2004–2020, 2022–
- Founders: Jerome Borazio; Danny Rogers
- Website: www.lanewayfestival.com.au

The St. Jerome's Laneway Festival, commonly referred to as Laneway, is a music festival that takes place in cities across Australia and New Zealand, since 2005. Beginning as predominantly an indie music event, the festival grew in popularity and expanded to five Australian cities – Melbourne, Sydney, Brisbane, Adelaide, and Fremantle / Perth – as well as Auckland (New Zealand), and Singapore (2011–2018).

== History ==
=== 2005 ===
St. Jerome's Laneway Festival began in Caledonian Lane, Melbourne, Australia, on Sunday 27 February 2005. The "St. Jerome's Summer Series" took place each Sunday afternoon, created by Jerome Borazio and Danny Rogers and featuring new bands of the time, including The Presets and Architecture in Helsinki. They then included a monthly Saturday night called "Brains", which was actually a residency for musical act The Avalanches, and Borazio and Rogers eventually convinced The Avalanches that they could close the lane, remove the bins and stage a laneway party. With the addition of promotional material and other acts, the inaugural St. Jerome's Laneway Festival was launched. The line-up included: The Avalanches, Art of Fighting, Eskimo Joe, The Dears, Cut Copy, Architecture in Helsinki, Clare Bowditch, the Feeding Set and Gersey.

Following a total attendance of 1,400 people at the first Laneway Festival, it was announced later in 2005 that Laneway was expanding to Sydney.

=== 2006 ===
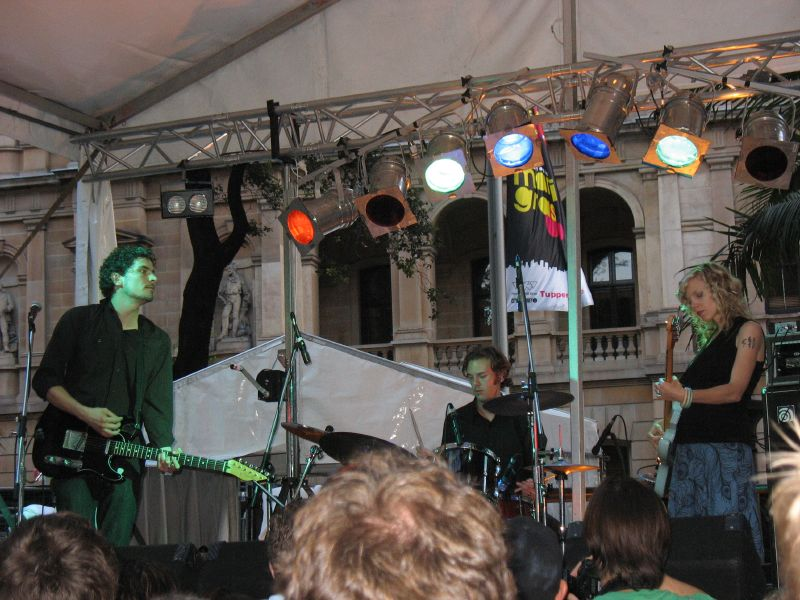
Art of Fighting performing at the 2006 Sydney Laneway

In 2006, both Melbourne and Sydney hosted a line-up of both international and domestic artists, including: Broken Social Scene, Les Savy Fav, Gossip, Pretty Girls Make Graves, The Avalanches, The Posies, The Hold Steady, The Raveonettes and The Drones.

=== 2007 ===
Just as Sydney's Laneway was becoming further established, Brisbane venue The Zoo staged the festival in 2007. A combination of street party and music show included performances from The Walkmen, Yo La Tengo, Peter Bjorn and John, Camera Obscura and Snowman.

=== 2008 ===
In 2008, Laneway found a home at the Fowler's Live venue in Adelaide. Laneway Festival 2008 included performances by Feist, Gotye, Clap Your Hands Say Yeah, The Presets, Stars, The Vasco Era, The Panics and Okkervil River.

=== 2009 ===
Laneway Festival Perth happened for the first time in 2009, which was well-reviewed by FasterLouder.

The 2009 event featured Girl Talk, Stereolab, Architecture In Helsinki, The Hold Steady, The Drones, Cut Off Your Hands, Four Tet, Tame Impala, El Guincho, Jay Reatard, Buraka Som Sistema (DJ/MC set), The Temper Trap and No Age.

An announcement in October 2009 confirmed that the festival would be held in Auckland, New Zealand, from 2010 onwards.

=== 2010 ===
In 2010, Laneway Festival implemented some significant changes to adapt to the growing stature of the event. After some considerable issues with the Melbourne site in 2009, Laneway left its original venue and moved to the inner western suburb of Footscray, with the support of the Footscray Community Arts Centre. The Sydney event relocated from the site at Macquarie Square in the CBD to the courtyards of the Sydney College of the Arts in Rozelle. The inaugural festival in Auckland, New Zealand, sold out.

The line-up in 2010 included: Florence & the Machine, Mumford and Sons, The XX, Kid Sam and Wild Beasts. In November 2010, the organisers announced Singapore as the first city to host the festival in South-east Asia.

=== 2011 ===
For the inaugural Laneway Festival Singapore, music fans from all over Asia travelled to the Canning Park venue. Paul Kay, co-founder and editor-in-chief of Time Out Hong Kong, wrote of "a lineup that mixed unimpeachable indie credibility with balls-out, dance-till-you-drop rock'n'roll euphoria".

The 2011 list of acts featured: Foals, Warpaint, Beach House, Two Door Cinema Club, Yeasayer, Deerhunter, Ariel Pink's Haunted Graffiti and !!!, among others. Foals frontman Yannis Philippakis called it "the best line-up we've been a part of for a very long time," while the Vine website's Marcus Teague wrote: "the top-to-bottom completeness of this year's Laneway line-up will be hard to beat in future years. Its roster of quality new bands coupled with on-the-cusp outright stars is veritably unmatched by any other festival. There's next to no filler ... It also seems to breed a discerning music fan that's (largely) focussed on the music."

In March, Laneway Festival co-hosted a day party at the American SXSW festival—alongside North American agency The Windish Agency, independent British promoter Eat Your Own Ears, and Austin, Texas publication Austinist—which featured Twin Shadow, Foster the People, Givers, Hanni El Khatib and Jamie Woon, among others. Eat Your Own Ears then invited the Laneway organisers to curate a stage at the August Field Day London event for the first time, which featured Matthew Dear, The Horrors and James Blake.

=== 2012 ===
In 2012, Laneway Festival selected acts such as M83, Chairlift, SBTRKT, Toro y Moi and Washed Out for that year's events. The festival recorded its highest tickets sales ever in Singapore, Auckland and Sydney in 2012. A Vine review stated: "This year's event seemed the most enjoyable yet … the 2012 Laneway proved that it's now an essential recurring destination on the calendar".

Laneway returned to SXSW in 2012—and again in partnership with The Windish Agency, Eat Your Own Ears and Austinist—to co-host the "Austin or Bust" day party that featured DZ Deathrays, Django Django and Chairlift. Laneway's organisers also returned to London's Field Day festival—in collaboration with Last.FM on this occasion—and showcased artists such as Blood Orange, Sleigh Bells, The Vaccines and Kindness.

=== 2013 ===
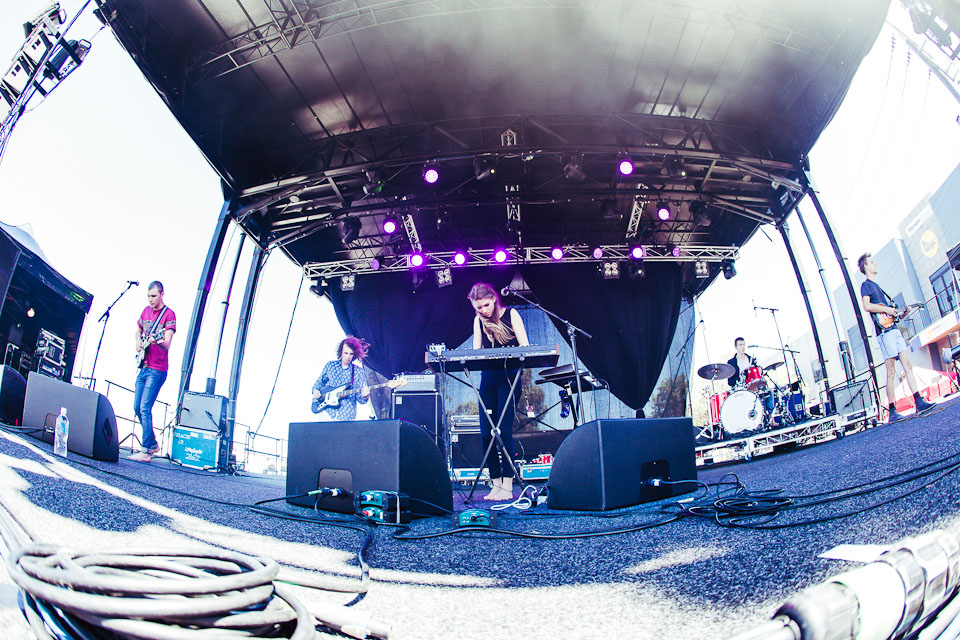
Snakadaktal performing at the 2013 Melbourne Laneway

The Laneway lineup in 2013 included: Bat for Lashes, Japandroids, Divine Fits, Alt-J, Of Monsters and Men, MS MR, Jessie Ware, Flume, Chet Faker, Pond and The Rubens. The Tone Deaf website wrote: "Laneway does not fail to live up to its reputation, putting the mega-corporate festivals to shame with [its] authenticity".

The festival continued to stage its events in New Zealand and Singapore, and programmed a stage at Field Day London for the third time. The Field Day stage featured a line-up of acts that included Charlie Boyer & The Voyeurs, Dark Bells and Django Django.

On 15 March 2013, Laneway Festival announced it would expand to Detroit, US, to make its North American debut on 14 September 2013. The inaugural Laneway Festival Detroit lineup was announced on 13 May 2013, and included co-headliners Sigur Rós and The National. The Detroit event also featured Chvrches, Solange, Savages, AlunaGeorge, Flume and Icona Pop. After spending some time in Detroit in 2012 at the invitation of the Palace Sports & Entertainment company, Rogers said he knew the city was Laneway's next stop and first American venue: "Detroit is having its rebirth and as Laneway continues to evolve, we can identify with a city that is continuing to evolve as well... It seemed like a great fit and this line-up seals it."

On 9 November 2013, Laneway Festival won Music Event of the Year at the West Australian Music Industry Awards.

=== 2014 ===
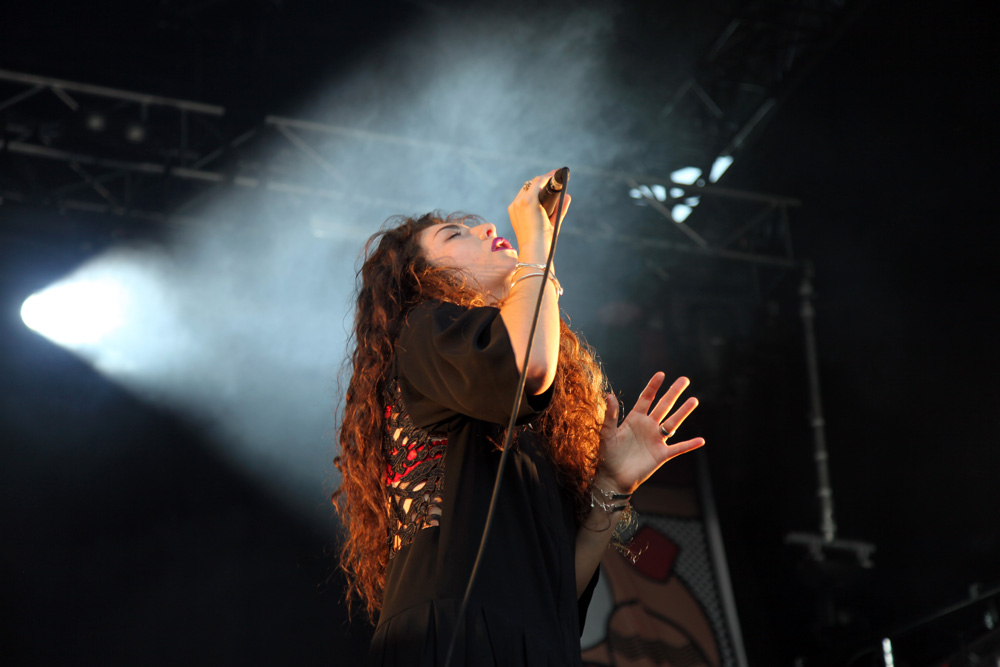
Lorde performing at the 2014 Sydney Laneway

Laneway Festival sold out five of the seven events in 2014. The festival featured Vance Joy, Lorde, CHVRCHES, Haim, The Jezabels, Earl Sweatshirt, Four Tet, Jamie xx, Frightened Rabbit, Daughter, Warpaint, Danny Brown, Savages and King Krule. Rogers said:

We're exceptionally proud of this year's line-up. As usual, the artists have been chosen on the strength of their music and their ability to deliver an insanely great live show. It's why we couldn't resist bringing a few international acts back and it's why we are so thrilled to introduce you to some most exciting new artists this side of the world has seen for the very first time. This country has so many incredibly talented artists; if only we could bring them all along.

In 2014, the Perth event relocated from the Perth Cultural Centre to Esplanade Park in the port city of Fremantle. The new venue was chosen due to the event's growth in popularity, accommodating 12,000 people. Laneway also relocated in Adelaide and moved to the historical site of Hart's Mill, Port Adelaide. In regard to the Adelaide move, Rogers explained: "We searched super hard to find a site that we felt could match the experience that other cities have had with Laneway. Renewal SA, the City of Port Adelaide Enfield and a team of locals have worked with us to find a site that ticks all the boxes."

New Zealand artist Lorde was scheduled to perform at Laneway Festival Auckland on 27 January 2014; however, due to her attendance at the Grammy Awards ceremony on 26 January in Los Angeles, US, she was unable to perform. In lieu of her performance at the festival, Laneway's promoters announced a special stand-alone Lorde performance at the festival site at Silo Park, which was held on 29 January 2014.

=== 2015 ===
The festival put women at the front in 2015, with the likes of FKA twigs, St Vincent, Angel Olsen, Banks and the Courtney Barnett playing some of the most coveted time-slots. Other featured musicians were Mac Demarco, Connan Mockasin, Peter Bibby and Pond. Agnes DeMarco, mother of Mac, featured as a special guest MC.

=== 2016 ===
2016 saw record ticket sales, and featured Beach House, DIIV, FIDLAR, Violent Soho, Grimes and DMA's, while Melbourne's Tripmonks made a splash with some unexpected nudity. Flume debuted his new material, including special guest appearances from MC Vince Staples and Kai.

=== 2017 ===
Laneway Festival 2017 was the 13th edition of the festival. The festival showcased new international acts such as Car Seat Headrest, NAO, Mick Jenkins, and Aurora, as well as local favourites like D.D Dumbo, Camp Cope, A.B. Original, Tash Sultana and Tame Impala. 2017 also saw Laneway Festival launch a new podcast, throw a Hottest 100 Backyard Party in Brisbane, and introduce the 1800-LANEWAY hotline in every Australian city.

=== 2018 ===
New collaborations included I OH YOU's Block Party, David Moyle's Royal Moyle food extravaganza, and the debut of Luke Henery's (Violent Soho) latest exhibition, "Everybody Needs A Home". It was the largest line-up so far and featured Mac DeMarco, The Internet and POND, as well as the Australian debut of (Sandy) Alex G, Dream Wife, Shame, S U R V I V E and Slowdive. Triple J live broadcast the Adelaide event, with Ben & Liam mc'ing the event.

The 2018 event in Singapore was the last one in the city.

=== 2019 ===
The 15th edition took place at a new Sydney venue, Footscray Park. Acts included Jorja Smith, Clairo, Denzel Curry and Rex Orange County. Gang of Youths closed out the festival in Fremantle.

The festival also teamed up with Girls Rock! to empower the next generation of women and gender-diverse musicians. The inaugural Girls Rock! collaboration featured Alex Lahey, Alex the Astronaut, Courtney Barnett, Georgia Maq (Camp Cope) and Middle Kids, with the line-up varying across each location.

=== 2020 ===
The 16th edition proved to be the most successful festival ever, with record ticket sales, with events held in Auckland, Brisbane, Melbourne, Adelaide, Fremantle and Sydney, where the event was held at The Domain for the very first time. The 1975 and Charli XCX headlined the festival. Other acts included Oliver Tree, BENEE, JID, King Gizzard and the Lizard Wizard, Tones and I and Ruel. Omar Apollo, Oliver Tree and bbno$ all made their Australian debuts.

The sold-out Laneway Festival after-parties, a one-off charity gig by The 1975 and Ruel, and the 50c donation from every beer sold at the festival, collectively raised over $150,000 to support those who were affected by the devastating 2019–20 Australian bushfire season.

=== 2021 ===
The 2021 edition was disrupted by the COVID-19 pandemic in Australia and New Zealand. In June, TEG purchased an undisclosed stake in the festival.

=== 2023 ===
The 2023 Auckland portion of the festival was cancelled due to the 2023 Auckland Anniversary Weekend floods.

=== 2025 ===
The 2025 festival took place at the following locations and dates in February:

- Auckland / Tāmaki Makaurau – Thu 6 Feb – Western Springs
- Brisbane / Turrbal Targun – Sat 8 Feb – Brisbane Showgrounds
- Sydney / Burramattagal and Wangal Land – Sun 9 Feb – Sydney Showground
- Melbourne / Wurundjeri Biik – Fri 14 Feb – The Park, Flemington
- Adelaide / Kaurna Yerta – Sat 15 Feb – Bonython Park
- Perth / Whadjuk Boodjar – Sun 16 Feb – Wellington Square

=== 2026 ===
The 2026 festival was held across six cities on the following dates:

Date	City	Venue
5 February	Auckland / Tāmaki Makaurau	Western Springs
7 February	Gold Coast / Kombumerri Jagun	Southport Sharks
8 February	Sydney / Gadigal & Bidjigal	Centennial Parklands
13 February	Melbourne / Wurundjeri Biik	Flemington Park
14 February	Adelaide / Kaurna Yerta	Adelaide Showground
15 February	Perth / Whadjuk Boodjar	Arena Joondalup

This year saw the relocation of the festival from Brisbane to the Gold Coast. This was due to the closure of the Brisbane Showgrounds for upgrades ahead of the 2032 Summer Olympics. This was the first year that Brisbane did not host the festival since the city's inclusion in 2007 (aside from 2021 when the entire festival was cancelled).

The Gold Coast is the first city in Australia to host the festival that is not a state capital.

=== 2027 ===
The 2027 festival will be held across four cities on the following dates:

Date	City	Venue
12 February	Sydney / Gadigal & Bidjigal	Centennial Parklands
13 February	Brisbane / Turrbal Targun	Brisbane Showgrounds
19 February	Melbourne / Wurundjeri Biik	Flemington Park
21 February	Auckland / Tāmaki Makaurau	Western Springs Stadium

This year saw the relocation of the festival from Gold Coast back to Brisbane as well as skipping Perth and Adelaide as host cities.

== Awards and nominations ==
=== NZEA Event Awards ===
At the 2026 New Zealand Event Awards, held on 5 August 2026 at the New Zealand International Convention Centre in Auckland, Laneway Festival New Zealand won the Music Event of The Year award.

=== ARIA Music Awards ===
The ARIA Music Awards is an annual awards ceremony that recognises excellence, innovation, and achievement across all genres of Australian music.

Year	Nominee / work	Award	Result	Ref.
2025	Laneway Festival	Best Music Festival	Won	
2026	Laneway Festival	Best Music Festival	Won	

=== Helpmann Awards ===
The Helpmann Awards is an awards show, celebrating live entertainment and performing arts in Australia, presented by industry group Live Performance Australia since 2001. Note: 2020 and 2021 were cancelled due to the COVID-19 pandemic.

Year	Nominee / work	Award	Result	Ref.
2006	St Jerome's Laneway Festival	Best Contemporary Music Festival	Nominated	
2007	St Jerome's Laneway Festival	Best Contemporary Music Festival	Nominated	
2008	St Jerome's Laneway Festival	Best Contemporary Music Festival	Nominated	
2016	St Jerome's Laneway Festival	Best Contemporary Music Festival	Nominated	
2017	St Jerome's Laneway Festival	Best Contemporary Music Festival	Nominated	
2018	St Jerome's Laneway Festival	Best Contemporary Music Festival	Nominated	

=== National Live Music Awards ===
The National Live Music Awards (NLMAs) commenced in 2016 to recognize contributions to the live music industry in Australia. They went on hiatus between 2020 and 2022.

Year	Nominee / work	Award	Result
2016	St Jerome's Laneway Festival	Best Live Music Festival or Event	Nominated
2016	St Jerome's Laneway Festival	Victorian Live Event of the Year	Won
2016	St Jerome's Laneway Festival	West Australian Live Event of the Year	Won
2017	St Jerome's Laneway Festival	Best Live Music Festival or Event	Nominated
2017	St Jerome's Laneway Festival	NSW Live Event of the Year	Won
2019	St Jerome's Laneway Festival	Best Live Music Festival or Event	Nominated
2020	St Jerome's Laneway Festival	Best Live Music Festival or Event	Nominated
2023	St Jerome's Laneway Festival	Best Live Music Festival or Event	Nominated

== 2005 lineup ==
- The Avalanches
- Brains World Music Party
- Art of Fighting
- Eskimo Joe
- The Dears
- Cut Copy
- Architecture in Helsinki
- Ground Components feat. Macromantics
- Clare Bowditch and the Feeding Set
- Gersey
- With a Garden Variety of DJs.

== 2006 lineup ==
- The Avalanches
- Broken Social Scene
- Les Savy Fav
- Pretty Girls Make Graves
- The Hold Steady
- The Posies
- Faker
- New Buffalo
- Youth Group
- Wolf & Cub
- Cut Copy - Melbourne only
- Augie March - Melbourne only
- The Temper Trap - Melbourne only
- Mountains in the Sky - Melbourne only
- Dane Tucquet - Melbourne only
- The Gossip - Sydney only
- The Raveonettes - Sydney only
- Decoder Ring - Sydney only
- Jens Lekman - Sydney only
- Pivot - Sydney only
- Mercy Arms - Sydney only
- Darren Hanlon - Sydney only
- The Pop Frenzy Sound Unit - Sydney only
- Clare Bowditch and the Feeding Set - Sydney only
- Gersey - Sydney only
- Art of Fighting - Sydney only

== 2007 lineup ==
- Yo La Tengo
- Peter Bjorn and John
- The Sleepy Jackson
- Camera Obscura
- Midnight Juggernauts
- Love Is All
- Fionn Regan
- Holly Throsby
- Dan Kelly
- Gerling
- Dappled Cities Fly
- The BellRays
- The Temper Trap
- My Disco
- The Crayon Fields
- Gersey
- The Shaky Hands
- Expatriate
- Snowman
- Bumblebeez
- Archie Bronson Outfit
- The Walkmen
- Youth Group
- Casino Twilight Dogs
- Macromantics
- Ground Components

== 2008 lineup ==
- Feist
- Clap Your Hands Say Yeah
- Gotye
- Cut Copy
- The Presets
- The Panics
- The Cool Kids
- Broken Social Scene Presents Spirit If...
- Okkervil River
- Dan Deacon^{†}
- Via Tania^{†}
- The Presets
- The Panics
- Bridezilla
- The Holidays
- The Devastations
- The Brunettes^{†}
- Little Red
- Rudely Interrupted
- Stars
- Violent Soho
- Batrider

^{†}: Not playing Adelaide

== 2009 lineup ==
- Girl Talk
- Stereolab
- Architecture in Helsinki
- The Hold Steady
- The Drones
- Cut Off Your Hands
- Four Tet
- Tame Impala
- El Guincho
- Jay Reatard
- Buraka Som Sistema
- The Temper Trap
- No Age
- The John Steel Singers
- Canyons
- Pivot
- Port O'Brien
- Holly Throsby
- Born Ruffians
- Mountains in the Sky
- Tim Fite
- Still Flyin'
- Daedelus
- Spiral Stairs
- Papa vs Pretty

== 2010 lineup ==
- Echo & the Bunnymen - No Melbourne / failed to show up in Brisbane.
- Midnight Juggernauts - Melbourne only
- Florence and the Machine
- Black Lips
- The xx
- Cut Off Your Hands
- Bachelorette
- Chris Knox and The Nothing
- The Naked and Famous
- The 3Ds
- Daniel Johnston – No Adelaide
- Sarah Blasko
- Street Chant
- N.A.S.A.
- Eddy Current Suppression Ring
- Hockey
- Dappled Cities
- Mumford & Sons
- The Very Best
- Radioclit
- Warpaint
- Wild Beasts – No Adelaide
- Whitley
- The Middle East
- Kid Sam
- Dirty Three

== 2011 lineup ==
- !!!
- The Antlers
- Ariel Pink's Haunted Graffiti
- Beach House
- Bear in Heaven
- Blonde Redhead
- Cloud Control
- Cut Copy
- Deerhunter
- Foals
- Gotye
- The Holidays
- Holy Fuck
- Jenny & Johnny
- Warpaint
- Les Savy Fav
- Local Natives
- Yeasayer
- Menomena
- PVT
- Rat Vs Possum (excluding Perth)
- Stornoway
- Two Door Cinema Club
- Violent Soho
- World's End Press

== 2012 lineup ==
- Active Child
- Anna Calvi
- Austra
- Bullion
- Chairlift
- Cults
- The Drums
- DZ Deathrays
- EMA
- Feist
- Geoffrey O'Connor
- Girls
- Givers
- Glasser
- The Horrors
- Husky
- John Talabot
- Jonti
- Laura Marling
- M83
- Oneman
- The Pains of Being Pure at Heart
- Pajama Club
- The Panics
- Portugal. The Man
- SBTRKT live
- Toro y Moi
- Total Control
- Twin Shadow
- Washed Out
- Yuck

== 2013 lineup ==
=== Australia ===
- Alpine
- Alt-J
- Bat for Lashes
- Chet Faker
- Cloud Nothings
- Divine Fits
- El-P
- Flume
- Henry Wagons & the Unwelcome Company
- High Highs
- Holy Other
- Japandroids
- Jessie Ware
- Julia Holter
- Kings of Convenience
- MS MR
- Nicolas Jaar
- Nite Jewel
- Of Monsters and Men
- Perfume Genius
- Poliça
- Pond
- Real Estate
- Shlohmo
- Snakadaktal
- The Men
- The Neighbourhood
- The Rubens
- Twerps
- Yeasayer

=== Detroit ===
- ADULT.
- AlunaGeorge
- Beacon
- Chet Faker
- CHVRCHES
- Deerhunter
- The Dismemberment Plan
- Flume
- Frightened Rabbit
- HAERTS
- Heathered Pearls
- Icona Pop
- Matthew Dear
- My Brightest Diamond
- The National
- Phosphorescent
- Run the Jewels (El-P & Killer Mike)
- Savages
- Shigeto
- Sigur Rós
- Solange
- Warpaint
- Washed Out
- Youth Lagoon

== 2014 lineup ==
=== Australia ===
- Adalita
- Autre Ne Veut
- Cashmere Cat
- Cass McCombs
- Chvrches
- Cloud Control
- Danny Brown
- Daughter
- Dick Diver
- Drenge
- Earl Sweatshirt
- Four Tet
- Frightened Rabbit
- HAIM
- DJ Jacinda Ardern
- Jagwar Ma
- Jamie xx
- King Krule
- Kirin J. Callinan
- Kurt Vile
- Lorde
- Mount Kimbie
- MT WARNING
- Parquet Courts
- Run the Jewels (El-P & Killer Mike)
- Savages
- Scenic
- The Growl
- The Jezabels
- Unknown Mortal Orchestra
- Vance Joy
- Warpaint
- XXYYXX
- Youth Lagoon

=== Singapore ===
- Chvrches
- Daughter
- Frightened Rabbit
- GEMA
- HAIM
- Jagwar Ma
- James Blake
- Jamie xx
- The Jezabels
- Kurt Vile
- Mount Kimbie
- Savages
- The Observatory
- Unknown Mortal Orchestra
- Vance Joy
- Vandetta
- XXYYXX
- Youth Lagoon

== 2015 lineup ==
=== Australia ===
- Agnes DeMarco (CAN)
- Andy Bull
- Angel Olsen (USA)
- Banks (USA)
- Benjamin Booker (USA)
- Caribou (CAN)
- Connan Mockasin (NZ)
- Courtney Barnett
- Dune Rats
- Eagulls (UK)
- Eves
- FKA twigs (UK)
- Flight Facilities
- Flying Lotus (UK)
- Future Islands (USA)
- Highasakite (NOR)
- Jon Hopkins (UK)
- Jungle (UK)
- Little Dragon (SWE)
- Mac DeMarco (CAN)
- Mansionair
- Perfect Pussy (USA)
- Peter Bibby
- Pond
- Ratking (USA)
- Raury (USA)
- Royal Blood (UK)
- Rustie (UK)
- Seekae
- SOHN (UK)
- St. Vincent (USA)
- Tkay Maidza
- Vic Mensa (USA)

=== New Zealand ===
- Angel Olsen
- Angus & Julia Stone
- Ariel Pink
- Banks
- Belle & Sebastian
- Bespin
- Connan Mockasin
- Courtney Barnett
- Dan Deacon
- Eagulls
- FKA twigs
- Flying Lotus
- Future Islands
- Heavy
- Iceage
- Jakob
- Jon Hopkins
- Jungle
- Literal Fuck
- Little Dragon
- Mac DeMarco
- Perfect Pussy
- Princess Chelsea
- Quarks!
- Race Banyon
- Ratking
- Royal Blood
- Rustie
- SOHN
- St. Vincent
- Tiny Ruins
- Vic Mensa

=== Singapore ===
- Angus & Julia Stone
- Banks
- Chet Faker
- Courtney Barnett
- Eagulls
- Enterprise
- FKA twigs
- Future Islands
- .gif
- Hanging Up the Moon
- Jon Hopkins
- Jungle
- Little Dragon
- Mac DeMarco
- Pastel Lite
- Pond
- Royal Blood
- Rustie
- St. Vincent

== 2016 lineup ==
=== Australia ===
- Ali Barter
- Banoffee
- Battles (USA)
- Beach House (USA)
- Big Scary
- Blank Realm
- Chvrches (UK)
- DIIV (USA)
- DMA's
- East India Youth (UK)
- FIDLAR (USA)
- Flume
- GoldLink (USA)
- Grimes (CAN)
- Health (USA)
- Hermitude
- High Tension
- Hudson Mohawke (UK)
- Japanese Wallpaper
- Jaegan Taylor and his dad
- Majical Cloudz (CAN)
- Methyl Ethel
- METZ (CAN)
- Purity Ring (CAN)
- QT (USA)
- Shamir (USA)
- Silicon
- Slum Sociable
- Sophie (UK)
- The Internet (USA)
- Royal Headache
- The Smith Street Band
- Thundercat (USA)
- Vince Staples (USA)
- Violent Soho

=== Singapore ===
- Battles
- Beach House
- Big Scary
- Cashew Chemists
- Cheats
- Chvrches
- East India Youth
- Fauxe
- Flume
- GDJYB
- Grimes
- Hermitude
- Hudson Mohawke
- Intriguant
- JPS
- Kane
- Kiat
- Mean
- METZ
- Purity Ring
- Rah
- Riot !n Magenta
- Shamir
- The 1975
- The Internet
- Thundercat
- Violent Soho

== 2017 lineup ==
=== Australia ===
Port Adelaide, Brisbane, Fremantle, Melbourne & Sydney

- A.B. Original
- Aurora (NOR)
- Bad Dreems (Adelaide only)
- Baro (Melbourne only)
- Bob Moses (CAN)
- Camp Cope
- Car Seat Headrest (USA)
- Clams Casino (USA)
- Confidence Man (Brisbane only)
- D.D Dumbo (All except Adelaide)
- Dream Rimmy (Fremantle only)
- Dune Rats
- Ecca Vandal (Melbourne only)
- Fascinator
- Floating Points (live) (UK)
- Flyying Colours (Melbourne only)
- Gang of Youths
- Genesis Owusu (Sydney only)
- GL (All except Fremantle)
- Glass Animals (UK)
- IV League (Melbourne only)
- Jagwar Ma
- Jess Kent
- Julia Jacklin
- King Gizzard & the Lizard Wizard
- Koi Child
- Lonelyspeck (Adelaide only)
- Luca Brasi
- Mick Jenkins (USA)
- Mr. Carmack
- Nao (UK)
- Nicholas Allbrook
- Nick Murphy
- Roland Tings
- Sampa the Great
- Tame Impala
- Tash Sultana
- Tourist (UK)
- Tycho (USA)
- White Lung (CAN)
- Whitney (USA)

=== New Zealand ===
Auckland

- Aurora
- Bob Moses
- Car Seat Headrest
- Clams Casino
- Cut Off Your Hands
- DMA's
- Fazerdaze
- Flight Facilities
- Floating Points (live)
- Fortunes
- Glass Animals
- Julia Jacklin
- K2K
- King Gizzard & the Lizard Wizard
- Mick Jenkins
- Mr. Carmack
- Nao
- Nick Murphy
- Nikolai
- Purple Pilgrims
- Refused
- Tame Impala
- The Chills
- The Veils
- Tourist
- Tycho
- What So Not
- White Lung
- Whitney
- Yukon Era

=== Singapore ===
- A/K/A Sounds
- Astreal
- Aurora
- Bob Moses
- Bottlesmoker
- Clams Casino
- Floating Points (DJ)
- Froya
- Gang of Youths
- Glass Animals
- Jagwar Ma
- King Gizzard & the Lizard Wizard
- Kohh
- Luca Brasi
- Mick Jenkins
- Mr. Carmack
- Nao
- Nick Murphy
- Poptart
- Sampa The Great
- Sam Rui
- Stars And Rabbit
- T-Rex
- Tash Sultana
- Tourist
- Tycho
- Wednesday Campanella
- White Lung
- Whitney

== 2018 lineup ==
Performer(s)	City						
Performer(s)	Sing	Auck	Ade	Mel	Syd	Bri	Fre
Aldous Harding (NZ)	●	●	●	●	●	●	●
Alextbh (MY)	●						
Alex Cameron			●	●	●	●	●
Amateur Takes Control (SG)	●						
Amy Shark	●	●	●	●	●	●	●
Anderson .Paak & The Free Nationals (USA)	●	●	●	●	●	●	●
Andy Garvey					●		
Angie McMahon				●			
B Wise					●		
BadBadNotGood (CAN)		●	●	●	●	●	●
Baker Boy				●			
Basenji				●	●	●	●
Baynk (NZ)		●					
Billie Eilish (USA)	●	●	●	●	●	●	●
Billy Davis and the Good Lords				●			
Bonobo (UK)	●	●	●	●	●	●	●
Cable Ties			●	●	●	●	●
CC:DISCO!							●
City Calm Down			●	●	●	●	●
Client Liaison			●				
Connan Mockasin (NZ)		●					
D.D Dumbo		●					
Dameeeela						●	
Die! Die! Die! (NZ)		●					
Dream Wife			●	●	●	●	●
Exhibitionist					●		
Father John Misty (USA)	●	●	●	●	●	●	●
Feels							●
Haiku Hands				●	●	●	
Hatchie						●	
Heals (ID)	●						
Jesswar				●	●	●	●
Julie Byrne (USA)		●					
Kevin Parker (DJ Set)							●
Kllo			●	●	●	●	
Loyle Carner (UK)	●	●	●	●	●	●	●
Lucy Cliche				●			
Mac DeMarco (CAN)	●	●	●	●	●	●	●
MAS1A (SG/CAN)	●						
Melodownz (NZ)		●					
Miss Blanks			●	●	●	●	●
Moses Sumney	●	●	●	●	●	●	●
Noah Slee (NZ/GER)		●					
Obedient Wives Club (SG)	●						
Odesza (USA)			●	●	●	●	●
Otologic				●			
Paradise Club			●				
Polyester (NZ)		●					
Pond		●					●
Reef Prince							●
Rolling Blackouts Coastal Fever	●	●	●	●	●	●	●
(Sandy) Alex G (USA)		●	●	●	●	●	●
S U R V I V E (USA)			●	●	●	●	●
Shame			●	●	●	●	●
Slowdive (UK)	●	●	●	●	●	●	●
Spike Fuck and the FML Band				●			
Stella Donnelly							●
Sylvan Esso (USA)	●	●	●	●	●	●	●
T$oko							●
THELIONCITYBOY (SG)	●						
The Babe Rainbow			●	●	●	●	
The Internet (USA)	●	●	●	●	●	●	●
The Ransom Collective (PH)	●						
The War on Drugs (USA)	●	●	●	●	●	●	●
Tim De Cotta (SG)	●						
Tokimonsta (USA)		●	●	●	●	●	●
Unitone HiFi (NZ)		●					
UV boi						●	
Wax Chattels (NZ)		●					
Wiki					●	●	●
Willaris. K				●	●	●	
Wolf Alice (UK)	●	●	●	●	●	●	●

== 2019 lineup ==
Performer(s)	City					
Performer(s)	Auck	Bri	Syd	Ade	Mel	Fre
A Boogie wit da Hoodie (USA)	●	●	●	●	●	●
Baker Boy		●	●	●	●	●
Bene (NZ)	●					
Camp Cope	●	●	●	●	●	●
Carla Geneve						●
Charlie Collins		●	●		●	
Clairo (USA)	●	●	●	●	●	●
Cosmo's Midnight	●	●	●	●	●	●
Courtney Barnett	●	●	●	●	●	●
Crooked Colours		●	●		●	
Daffodils (NZ)	●					
Denzel Curry (USA)	●	●	●		●	
DJDS (USA)	●	●	●		●	●
Florence and the Machine (UK)	●					
G Flip	●	●	●	●	●	●
Gang of Youths	●	●	●	●	●	●
Highbeams (NZ)	●					
Imugi (NZ)	●					
Jon Hopkins (UK)	●	●	●	●	●	●
Jorja Smith (UK)	●	●	●			
Kian		●	●	●	●	●
Lontalius (NZ)	●					
Mansionair		●	●	●	●	
Masego (USA)	●	●	●	●	●	●
Methyl Ethel		●	●	●	●	●
Middle Kids	●	●	●	●	●	●
Miss June (NZ)	●					
Mitski (USA)	●	●	●		●	
Parquet Courts (USA)	●	●	●	●	●	●
Rat!hammock					●	
Ravyn Lenae (USA)	●	●	●	●	●	●
Rex Orange County (UK)	●	●	●	●	●	●
Robinson (NZ)	●					
Ruby Fields		●	●	●	●	
Skegss	●	●	●	●	●	●
Smino (USA)	●	●	●	●	●	●
Sweater Curse		●				
Tasman Keith			●			
The Dead C (NZ)	●					
The Smith Street Band		●	●	●	●	●
What So Not		●	●	●	●	●
Wing Defence				●		
Yellow Days (UK)	●	●	●		●	●

== 2020 lineup ==
Performer(s)	City					
Performer(s)	Auck	Bri	Syd	Ade	Mel	Fre
bbno$ (CAN)	●	●	●	●	●	●
Benee (NZ)	●	●	●	●	●	●
Charli XCX (UK)	●	●	●	●	●	●
Col3trane (UK)	●	●	●	●	●	●
DMA's		●	●	●	●	●
Earl Sweatshirt (USA)	●	●	●	●	●	●
Eleven7Four (NZ)	●					
Fontaines D.C. (IRL)	Cancelled	Cancelled	Cancelled	Cancelled	Cancelled	Cancelled
George Alice				●		
Hatchie		●	●		●	
Hockey Dad	●	●	●	●	●	●
J.I.D (USA)	●	●	●	●	●	●
JessB (NZ)		●	●		●	
Julia Jacklin	●					
Kaiit	●	●	●	●	●	●
King Gizzard & the Lizard Wizard	●	●	●	●	●	●
Kučka		●	●		●	●
Mahalia (UK)	●	●	●		●	
Mermaidens (NZ)	●					
Ocean Alley		●	●	●	●	●
Oliver Tree (USA)		●	●	●	●	
Omar Apollo (USA)	●	●	●	●	●	●
Pist Idiots		●	●	●	●	●
Ruel	●	●	●	●	●	●
Rüfüs Du Sol	●					
Soaked Oats (NZ)	●					
Spacey Jane	●	●	●	●	●	●
Stella Donnelly	●	●	●	●	●	●
the Chats	●	●	●	●	●	●
the 1975 (UK)	●	N/A	●	●	●	●
the Lazy Eyes			●			
Tones and I		●	●	●	●	●

== 2023 lineup ==
The Auckland edition of the festival was supposed to be held on 30 January, but cancelled due to rainfall.

Performer(s)	City				
Performer(s)	Bri	Syd	Ade	Mel	Per
100 gecs (USA)	●	●	●	●	●
Abby Bella May		●			
Adam Newling	●	●	●	●	
The Backseat Lovers (USA)	●	●	●	●	●
The Beths (NZ)	●	●	●	●	●
Chaos in the CBD (NZ)	●	●	●	●	●
Coldwave			●		
Dallas Woods					●
Felivand	●				
Finneas (USA)	●	●	●	●	●
Fontaines D.C. (IRL)	●	●	●	●	●
Fred Again (UK)	●	●	●	●	●
Girl in Red (NO)	●	●	●	●	●
Haim (USA)	●	●	●	●	●
Harvey Sutherland	●	●	●	●	●
Hockey Dad	●	●		●	
Jacoténe	●	●	●	●	●
jamesjamesjames	●	●	●	●	●
Joji (JPN)	●	●	●	●	●
Julia Jacklin	●	●		●	
The Jungle Giants	●	●	●	●	●
Knucks (UK)	●	●	●	●	●
The Lazy Eyes	●	●	●	●	●
Logic1000	●	●	●	●	●
Mallrat	●	●	●	●	●
Phoebe Bridgers (USA)	●	●	●	●	●
Pricie				●	
Ross from Friends (UK)	●	●	●	●	●
Ruby Cannon		●			
Siobhan Cotchin					●
Slowthai (UK)	●	●	●	●	●
Sophiya		●			
Sycco	●	●	●	●	●
Tasman Keith	●	●	●	●	●
Tentendo				●	
Turnstile (USA)			●	●	●
Yard Act (UK)	●	●	●	●	●

== 2024 lineup ==
The 2024 festivals were headlined by Stormzy, Steve Lacy, and Dominic Fike.

Performer(s)	City					
Performer(s)	Bri	Syd	Auck	Ade	Mel	Per
1TBSP		check				
AJ Tracey	check	check	check	check	check	check
Andyheartthrob			check			
Angie McMahon	check	check		check	check	check
Atarangi			check			
The Belair Lip Bombs					check	
Blondshell	check		check		check	
The Buoys					check	
C.Frim		check				
Chloe Dadd		check				
Church			check			
Civic					check	
Confidence Man	check	check		check	check	check
Cordae	check	check	check	check	check	check
D4vd	check	check	check	check	check	check
Daily J	check					
DOMi & JD Beck	check	check	check		check	
Dominic Fike	check	check	check	check	check	check
Dope Lemon	check	check	check	check	check	check
Dust					check	
Erny Belle			check			
Faye Webster	check	check	check	check	check	check
Felony.	check					
Floodlights					check	
FRIDAY*		check				
Hanbee			check			
Hemlocke Springs	check	check	check	check	check	check
Home Brew			check			
HorsegiirL	check	check	check		check	
Jai Piccone		check				
JK-47	check	check			check	
Lotte Gallagher					check	
Miss Kaninna	check	check		check	check	check
Molly Millington		check				
Molly Payton			check			
Nia Archives	check	check	check	check	check	check
Otiuh						check
Paris Texas	check	check	check	check	check	check
Platonic Sex	check					
Pretty Girl	check	check	check	check	check	check
Raave Tapes		check				
Raye	check	check	check	check	check	check
Rehekōrero			check			
Rona.		check				
Skin on Skin	check	check	check	check	check	check
Steve Lacy	check	check	check	check	check	check
Stormzy	check	check	check	check	check	check
Suzi					check	
Teenage Dads	check	check		check	check	check
These New South Whales					check	
The Tullamarines				check		
Unknown Mortal Orchestra	check	check	check		check	
Vacations	check	check			check	
Worm Girlz		check				

== 2025 lineup ==
The 2025 festivals were headlined by Charli XCX, Clairo, and Beabadoobee.

Performer(s)	City					
Performer(s)	Bri	Syd	Auck	Ade	Mel	Per
2hollis	check	check	check	check	check	check
Barry Can’t Swim	check	check	check	check	check	check
Beabadoobee	check	check	check	check	check	check
Bicep	check	check	check	check	check	check
Charli XCX	check	check	check	check	check	check
Clairo	check	check	check	check	check	check
Devaura		check				
Divebar Youth				check		
DJ Ivan Berko					check	
Djo	check	check	check	check	check	check
Elliot & Vincent			check			
Eyedress	check	check	check	check	check	check
Fcukers	check	check	check	check	check	check
Girl and Girl	check	check			check	
Hamdi	check	check	check	check	check	check
Joey Valence & Brae	check	check	check	check	check	check
julie	check	check	check		check	
Jxnior						check
Mariae Cassandra						check
Maybe in May		check				
Miles Nautu	check					
Neesha Alexander	check					
Ninajirachi	check	check		check	check	check
Olivia Dean	check	check	check	check	check	check
Remi Wolf	check	check	check	check	check	check
RNZŌ			check			
RONA.	check	check		check	check	check
Skegss	check	check	check	check	check	check
Smol Fish						check
STÜM	check	check			check	
Twine				check		
Vera Ellen			check			
The Vovos					check	

== 2026 lineup ==
The 2026 festival was headlined by Chappell Roan.

Performer(s)	City					
Performer(s)	Gol	Syd	Auck	Ade	Mel	Per
9lives			check			
Alex G	check	check	check	check	check	check
Armlock	check	check			check	
BENEE	check	check	check		check	
Blusher	check	check			check	
Cavetown	check	check	check	check	check	check
Chappell Roan	check	check	check	check	check	check
Djanaba	check	check		check	check	check
Geese	check	check	check		check	
Gigi Perez	check	check	check	check	check	check
Jensen McRae	check	check	check		check	
Lontalius			check			
Lucy Dacus	check	check	check	check	check	check
Malcolm Todd	check	check	check	check	check	check
Mina Galán	check	check	check	check	check	check
MOKOTRON			check			
Mt. Joy	check	check	check	check	check	check
Oklou	check	check	check	check	check	check
PinkPantheress	check	check	check	check	check	check
Ringlets			check			
Role Model	check	check	check	check	check	check
Shady Nasty	check	check			check	
Teen Jesus and the Jean Teasers	check	check		check	check	check
The Belair Lip Bombs	check	check			check	
The Dare	check	check	check	check	check	check
Wet Leg	check	check	check	check	check	check
Wisp	check	check	check		check	
Wolf Alice	check	check	check	check	check	check
Womb			check			
Yung Lean & Bladee	check	check	check	check	check	check

== 2027 lineup ==
The 2027 festival will be headlined by Fontaines D.C. and Hayley Williams.

Performer(s)	City			
Performer(s)	Syd	Mel	Bri	Auck
1tbsp	check	check	check	check
Adéla	check	check	check	check
Automatic	check	check	check	check
Balu Brigada	check	check	check	check
Bleech 9:3	check	check	check	check
Daine	check	check	check	check
Danny L Harle	check	check	check	check
DIIV	check	check	check	check
dj_DAVE	check	check	check	check
Ecca Vandal	check	check	check	check
Florence Road	check	check	check	check
Fontaines D.C.	check	check	check	check
Greatsouth				check
Gurriers	check	check	check	check
Hayley Williams	check	check	check	check
HorsegiirL	check	check	check	check
Jane Remover	check	check	check	check
Kim Petras	check	check	check	check
MOKOMOKAI				check
MUNA	check	check	check	check
Ninajirachi	check	check	check	check
O & The Mo				check
Office Dog				check
Public Figures	check	check	check	
Rachel Chinouriri	check	check	check	check
Rico Nasty	check	check	check	check
rommulas	check	check	check	check
Slayyyter	check	check	check	check
Swapmeet	check	check	check	
Tiffany Day	check	check	check	check
Trials	check	check	check	
Violet Grohl	check	check	check	
