= The Protist =

- Origin: California, United States
- Genres: Electronica, alternative dance, ambient
- Years active: 2007–present
- Labels: Oksin Records
- Members: Justin Kleiner; Matt Kleiner
- Website: TheProtist.com

The Protist is an American, California based electronic/dance band, formed in 2007 by brothers Matt and Justin Kleiner. They are also known for their visual sensibilities, combining painting and video with their musical releases.

== History ==
Both Justin and Matt Kleiner had been creating music and artwork independently for several years. But, it wasn't until 2007 that they started collaborating. Later in the year, they formed The Protist. and released a self-titled EP. In 2008, they created new songs, which appeared on the surf film “Puddles in the Sky.” In early 2009, they released a second EP, titled "Persona." They are currently working on a new album, titled “Cycles,” which is said to coincide with a series of paintings to illustrate it.

== Discography ==
=== EPs ===
- Self-Titled (December 3, 2007)
- Persona (March 9, 2009)

=== Albums ===
- Cycles (To be Released, 2010)

=== Singles ===
- Dissolution (January 1, 2010)

=== Remixes ===
- Years Around the Sun "Failing At Art" (August 1, 2009)
- Years Around the Sun "Heart Delay" (August 1, 2009)

== Music videos ==
- Cumulus (2008)
- Submerged (2008)

== Bibliography ==
- Art for Obama (Abrams Image) Artwork featured (October 1, 2009)
