= If Not Winter (album) =

Studio album by Wisp
- Released: August 1, 2025
- Recorded: 2024–2025
- Studio: Los Angeles
- Genre: Shoegaze; nu gaze
- Length: 38:13
- Label: Music Soup; Interscope
- Producer: Aldn; Darcy Baylis; Colin Brittain; Zach CapittiFenton; Julian Emken; Gabe Greenland; Grayskies; Elliott Kozel; Kraus; Photographic Memory; Stint

Wisp chronology
| Pandora (2024) | If Not Winter (2025) |

Singles from If Not Winter
- 1. "Sword" Released: March 14, 2025; 2. "Get Back to Me" Released: April 18, 2025; 3. "Save Me Now" Released: June 6, 2025; 4. "Breathe Onto Me" Released: July 18, 2025; 5. "Serpentine" Released: July 29, 2025

If Not Winter is the debut studio album by the American musician Wisp. It was released on August 1, 2025, through Interscope Records and Music Soup. Following the release of her debut extended play (EP) Pandora in 2024, Wisp had started working on new material in mid-2024. The album was written and recorded in Los Angeles, with production handled by various record producers, including Kraus, Photographic Memory, Stint, and Aldn.

In contrast to the melodic sound of her previous EP, If Not Winter expands on the shoegaze style of Pandora, while incorporating elements of pop, electronic, and nu gaze. The album explores themes of personal growth, loss, self-doubt, love, vulnerability, and grief. Sonically, the album is characterized by its vocal layering. Its lyrics and visuals drew influence from medieval fantasy, movies, poetry and greek mythology, with its title being derived from the Sappho poetry collection If Not, Winter (2002) by Anne Carson. The project was promoted through five singles—"Sword", "Get Back to Me", "Save Me Now", and "Breathe Onto Me—as well as an accompanying tour. Upon release, If Not Winter received widespread critical acclaim from online music publications, and debuted on the Billboard Top Current Album Sales chart.

== Background and recording ==
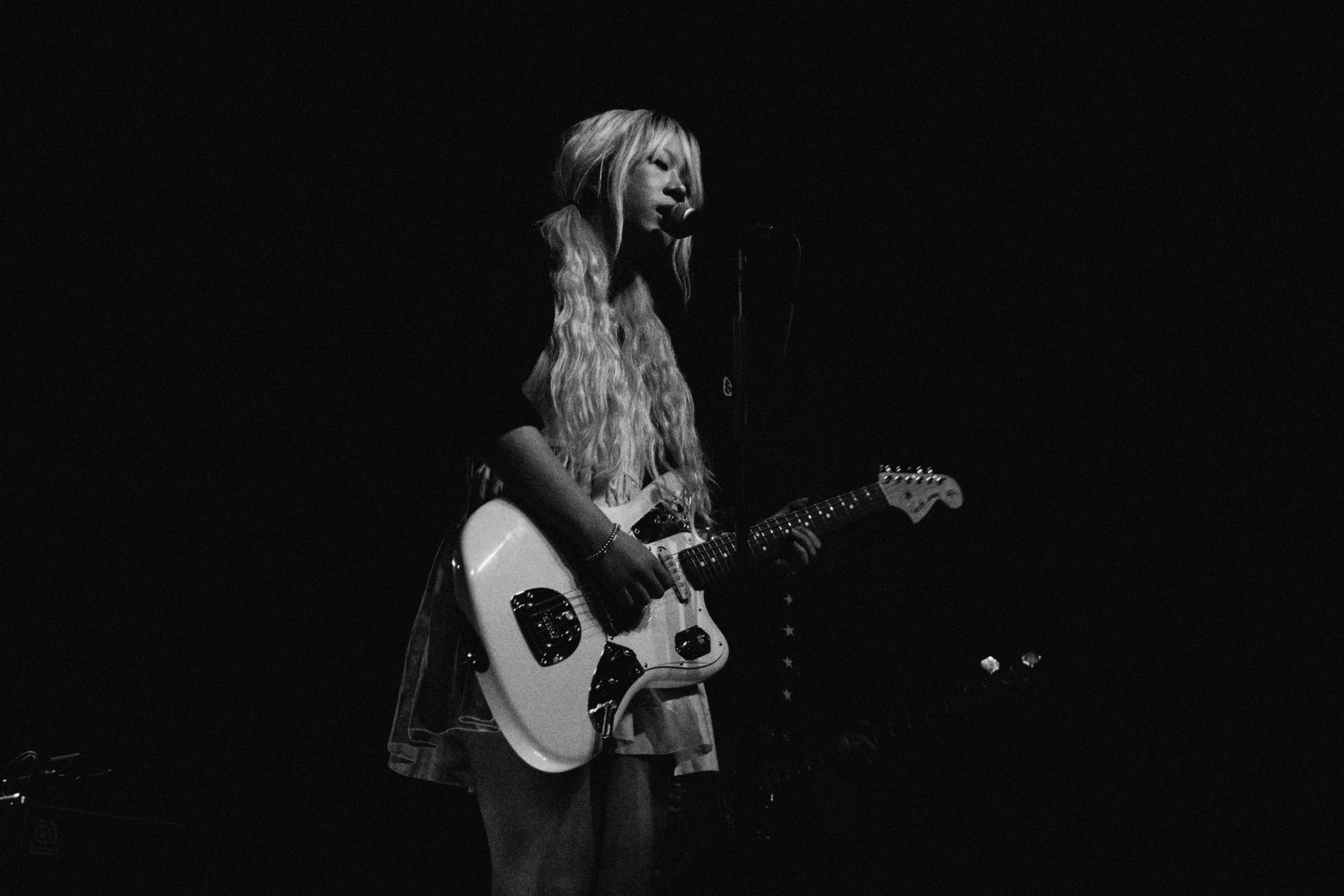
Wisp performing at UC Santa Barbara for her If Not Winter tour in November 2025

Natalie Lu a.k.a. Wisp began writing songs after being gifted an acoustic guitar by her mother during the COVID-19 pandemic. In April 2023, she self-released her debut single "Your Face", which gained significant traction, and led to her signing a record deal with Interscope Records. The following year, Lu had released her debut extended play (EP) Pandora, through Interscope and Music Soup. It would debut at number seven on the UK Independent Albums Breakers chart, advancing around 10,000 album-equivalent units. Pandora received "mixed or average" reviews from critics who praised it for its take on the shoegaze genre, but highlighted its lack of originality.

Lu embarked on a tour in support of the EP in April and May 2024, and subsequently began working on her debut album, naming it in reference to the Sappho poetry collection If Not, Winter (2002).

By January 2025, Wisp was in the early stages of writing and recording If Not Winter. Whilst working on the album, Wisp drew influence from the Scottish rock band Cocteau Twins' album The Moon and the Melodies (1986), Chappell Roan, Whirr and Slowdive. She aimed to make the album a "cohesive" and "story-driven" album with greater pop and electronic music influences that would move her past the shoegaze label earned earlier in her career, which she found "limiting". The album was recorded by Wisp in Los Angeles for over a year and a half. In April 2025, Wisp revealed two songs at a Coachella show—"Get Back to Me" and an untitled song. Wisp conceptualized If Not Winter as a "diary" full of entries of her childhood dreams.

== Composition ==
=== Overview ===
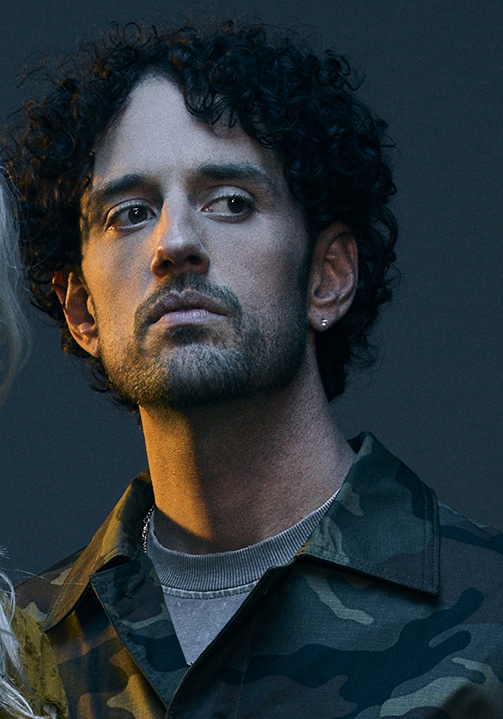
Colin Brittain was one of the producers who contributed to the creation of If Not Winter.

If Not Winter is a shoegaze album that has also been described as pop, grunge-gaze, electronic, alt-pop, pop-punk, avant-pop, dream-pop, and nu gaze. While critics had classified the album's theme as "medieval fantasy". Marked as an expansion of Pandora's shoegaze, the album clocks out at about 38 minutes with 12 tracks. The album's concept was based on Wisp's idea of creating an album that acted as a "diary" entry of her childhood dreams. Production for the album was handled by multiple record producers, including Max Epstein, Photographic Memory, Aldn, Kraus, Colin Brittain, and Stint, among others. Paste's Olivia Abercrombie described the lyrics as "sweet", and stated that the lyrical drama present throughout the record had "prevailed". While Heather Phares at AllMusic highlighted the traces of the album's influences: Whirr, Nothing, and Deftones.

=== Tracks ===
Kieran Press-Reynolds at Pitchfork discussed the tracks on the album, writing that it began with the "cresting of grunge-gaze volcanoes on "Sword" and "Breathe onto me," to the fading of daylight to dusk on tracks "After Dark" and "Guide Light". Lyrically, the album had covered Wisp's emotions. Reynolds felt that the "witchy synths" in "Guide Light" were stolen from Norwegian-American singer Elusin’s "Highway", and the "crystalline static" that opened “Mesmerized” hinted at My Bloody Valentine's "wonky feedback sampling". The reviewer had compared 'Get Back To Me” to a "microwaved" Cocteau Twins instrumental, and felt that the titular track dropped listeners in a "patch of grass with folksy acoustic strums". "After Dark" is a nu-gaze song that begins with a soft-opening, and transitions into a "barrage of noise".

== Promotion and release ==
The album's lead single "Sword" was released on March 14, 2025. In an interview with Paper, Wisp stated the album was initially planned for a release in July 2025. Wisp had released "Get Back to Me" as the second single for If Not Winter. Later, on June 6, 2025, "Save Me Now" was released as the third single. On June 24, 2025, Wisp announced that If Not Winter had been completed after a year of production, alongside an acoustic video of her performance of "Serpentine" at the La Blogothèque. "Breathe Onto Me" was released as the album's fourth single on July 18, 2025. "Serpentine" was released as the album's fifth and final single on July 29, 2025.

If Not Winter was released on August 1, through Interscope and Music Soup; with a visualizer for "Save Me Now" being released concurrently. Wisp embarked on a headlining tour of North America and Europe in support of If Not Winter between August 22 and November 2, 2025. Presales for the tour were made available in June 2025, and could be received through Wisp's website. In between the tour, Wisp supported the American heavy metal band System of a Down between August 22 and September 3.

== Critical reception ==
Professional ratings
Aggregate scores
| Source | Rating |
|---|---|
| AnyDecentMusic? | 7.2/10 |
| Metacritic | 75/100 |
Review scores
| Source | Rating |
| AllMusic | 4/5 stars |
| Clash | 8/10 |
| Kerrang! | 4/5 stars |
| NME | 4/5 stars |
| Paste | 7.3/10 |
| Pitchfork | 5.8/10 |
| The Line of Best Fit | 7/10 |

Editors at AnyDecentMusic? rated If Not Winter an 7.2 out of 10, based on 7 scores. According to the review aggregator Metacritic, If Not Winter received "generally favorable reviews" based on a weighted average score of 75 out of 100 from 7 critic scores.

Heather Phares at AllMusic wrote that Wisp "took her time writing and recording", which in turn created "a more dramatic, mature kind of shoegaze". The reviewer had also said that If Not Winter was a "work of an artist who thinks and dreams big". Clash's editor Robbin Murray said that the album was "neatly cohesive." While Kieran Press-Reynolds of Pitchfork criticized its lack of uniqueness, saying that it was "a full-length debut that’s beautiful on the surface but uninterested in challenging the genre’s priors, [...] tries to sculpt a world out of her ASMR-meets-arena-rock odysseys." Paste's Olivia Abercrombie said that it was "a surprising first record, packed with her distinctive, beloved heavy distortion, but now featuring some poppier influences and unique genre blending." Kristen S. Hé at NME praised the songwriting, saying that it "sheds the mystique". Writing for The Line of Best Fit, Matt Young said If Not Winter "arrives at the height of summer like a shimmering shoegaze fantasia, something aching, bred from restless longing and mythic yearning." Rolling Stone's John Lonsdale called it a "celestial collection of shoegaze-steeped tracks featuring ethereal yet massive electric guitars and angelic pop melodies." While Emma Wilkes at Kerrang! felt that it was "pure, soul-soothing escapism".

== Track listing ==
| No. | Title | Writer(s) | Producer(s) | Length |
|---|---|---|---|---|
| 1. | "Sword" | Natalie R. Lu; Ajay Bhattacharyya; Alden Gardner Robinson; Gabriel Greenland; Max Epstein | Aldn; Gabe Greeland; Stint | 2:26 |
| 2. | "Breathe Onto Me" | Lu; Zach CapittiFenton; Epstein; Grayskies | CapittiFenton; Grayskies; Photographic Memory; Stint | 3:58 |
| 3. | "Save Me Now" | Lu; Bhattacharyya; Colin Brittain; Michael Montoya | Brittain; Stint | 3:02 |
| 4. | "After Dark" | Lu; Robinson; Greenland; Bhattacharyya | Aldn; Greenland; Stint | 2:55 |
| 5. | "Guide Light" | Lu; Grayskies; Daniel Phillips; Liam Toon | Grayskies; Stint | 3:48 |
| 6. | "Latvia" | Lu; Bhattacharyya | Stint | 1:14 |
| 7. | "If Not Winter" | Lu; Robinson; Greenland; Bhattacharyya | Aldn; Greenland; Stint | 4:46 |
| 8. | "Mesmerized" | Lu; Epstein; CapittiFenton | CapittiFenton; Photographic Memory; Stint | 3:35 |
| 9. | "Serpentine" | Lu; Epstein; Darcy Baylis | Photographic Memory; Baylis; Stint | 3:04 |
| 10. | "Get Back to Me" | Lu; Bhattacharyya; Robinson; Elliott Kozel; Greenland | Aldn; Kozel; Greenland; Stint | 3:10 |
| 11. | "Black Swan" | Lu; Julian Emken; William Kraus | Emken; Kraus; Stint | 4:25 |
| 12. | "All I Need" | Lu; Robinson; Greenland | Aldn; Greenland; Stint | 1:50 |
| Total length: | | | | 38:13 |

Notes

- All tracks are stylized in sentence case.

== Personnel ==
Credits adapted from Tidal.

- Wisp – vocals, songwriting
- Max Epstein – electric guitar (1, 2), engineering (1, 3, 9), additional engineering (2, 8, 11), drum programming (10)
- George Janho – engineering (1, 3), additional engineering (2, 4, 7–9, 11, 12), drum programming (10)
- Lars Stalfors – mixing (tracks 1, 2, 4–12)
- Stephen Kaye – mixing (3)
- Ruairi O'Flaherty – mastering
- Aldn – songwriting, production (1, 4, 7, 10, 12)
- Zach Capittifenton – drums (1–4, 7, 9–11)
- Grayskies – production (2, 5)
- Stint – engineering (3), vocal engineering (2–5, 7–12), additional engineering (4, 7, 12)
- Darcy Baylis – production (9)
- Michael Montoya – production (3)
- Colin Brittain – production (3)
- Jannick Frampton – additional mixing (3)
- Greenland – songwriting, production (1, 4, 7, 10, 12)
- Daniel Phillips – bass (5)
- Liam Toon – drums (5)

== Charts ==
=== Weekly charts ===
Weekly chart performance for If Not Winter
| Chart (2025) | Peak position |
|---|---|
| US Top Current Album Sales (Billboard) | 37 |

== Release history ==
Release dates and formats
| Release date | Edition(s) | Format(s) | Ref. |
|---|---|---|---|
| August 1, 2025 | Standard | Digital download; streaming; CD; vinyl LP | |
