= Taylor Steele =

Taylor Steele may refer to:

- Taylor Steele (figure skater)
- Taylor Steele (filmmaker)
