= Get Back to Me =

Single by Wisp

from the album If Not Winter
- Released: April 18, 2025
- Genre: Metal
- Length: 3:10
- Label: Music Soup; Interscope
- Producers: Aldn; Elliott Kozel; Gabe Greenland; Stint

Wisp singles chronology
"Sword" (2025)	"Get Back to Me" (2025)	"Save Me Now" (2025)

"Get Back to Me" is a song by American musician Wisp. Originally debuted at Coachella, the song was included and was released as a promotional single for her debut studio album, If Not Winter (2025). The song was written by Wisp and co-written by its producers, while production was handled by Aldn,Stint, Elliott Kozel, and Gabe Greenland.

== Background ==
Wisp had debuted "Get Back to Me" and an untitled song live at Coachella. The song would later be released on April 18, 2025. as album the single off Lu's debut studio album If Not Winter. In a review with Dork, Wisp explained that the song represents "the greed for chaos, even at the cost of yourself,” “It’s about staying in a place you know isn’t good for you, while seemingly being in an unbreakable cycle of going back—which portrays desperation, recklessness and limerence.”

== Critical reception ==
Michael O'Connor Marotta of Vanyaland had felt that the song pulled listeners into Wisp’s world "through a noisy, yet comforting, embrace." While Pitchfork's Kieran Press-Reynolds had felt the song was "a microwaved Cocteau Twins instrumental."
