= Momentum (2001 film) =

2001 surf movie

Momentum: Under The Influence
- Directed by: Matt Beauchesne
- Written by: Joe Gugliellmino
- Produced by: Taylor Steele (filmmaker)
- Starring: CJ Hobgood, Paul Roach, Dan Malloy, Mick Fanning, Bruce Irons, Taj Burrow, Damien Hobgood, Joel Parkinson, Ben Bourgois, Andy Irons, David Rastovich, Dean Morrison
- Edited by: Matt Beauchesne
- Music by: Dustin Lynn, Al Guerra, John Lappen
- Distributed by: Steelhouse
- Release date: November 19, 2001
- Running time: 45 minutes
- Language: English

Momentum: Under the Influence is a surf movie distributed by Steelhouse Distribution and produced by Poor Specimen. It features all the best surfers in the world under 23 that surf places like Mentawai Islands, Australia, South Africa, France, Timor Island, Indonesia, Mexico, Hawaii and California. Surfers include CJ Hobgood, Damien Hobgood, Paul Roach Dan Malloy, David Rastovich, Mick Fanning, Taj Burrow, Joel Parkinson, Ben Bourgois, Bruce Irons, Andy Irons, and Dean Morrison.

== Music ==
Artists include At The Drive-In, Refused, CKY, Pinback, Shellac, No Knife, Pressure 4-5, International Noise Conspiracy, Backyard Babies, Turing Machine, Chevelle, Jimmy Eat World.
