= Mt Warning (band) =

Australian musical group

MT WARNING
- Origin: Northern NSW, Australia
- Genre: Alternative rock
- Years active: 2012-present
- Label: Independent
- Members: Mikey Bee (Songwriter, Music); Taylor Steele (filmmaker)(Producer)
- Website: www.mtwarningmusic.com

Mt Warning (stylised MT WARNING) is an alternative rock band from Northern New South Wales, Australia that formed in 2012. Their debut album Midnight Set was produced by the filmmaker Taylor Steele. The name for the band comes from the disputed name for a mountain near their home town near Mount Warning.

== Beginnings ==
The first gigs for Mt Warning were support slots for The Rubens and The Temper Trap, which Time Off Brisbane said: "A perfect rattling tenor and there's clearly a few people hooked. His haunting and slightly cinematic single, "Burn Again", deftly prepares the ground for what's to come"; and Drum Media said of their Sydney performance: "Flanked by an uber-cool collection of lads and ladies, showed some solid guitar prowess and a powerful voice".

These shows were followed by a trip to London for a show at The Shacklewell Arms, presented by Communion & Eat Your Own Ears who said of their single "Forward Miles": "There's a tingle of summer in the air in London and this new one from MT Warning could be one of its signature 2013 jams." Whilst in London they opened the main stage at Field Day London 2013. along with Disclosure, Solange and Mount Kimbie. Time Out London describes Mt Warning as "thumping alternative rock, with electronic and post-rock influences from the likes of Sigur Rós".

In an interview with Moustache Magazine, front-man Mikey Bee explained, "Producing in the sense that he throws visuals at me...he'll tell me, 'What if these guitars were a bit more abrasive there or the vocal was softer or what would a lyric like this sound like.' He's not a musician so those kinds of suggestions from someone who doesn't play but sees music is really awesome."

== Career ==
Their debut single "Forward Miles" was added to playlists on Triple J, XFM in the UK and the band were predicted as a 'Next Hype' artist by Zane Lowe on BBC Radio 1. The band also released a remix in conjunction with US Filter magazine via Vinnie La Duce and a 7inch release on Rough Trade Records.

The second single "Youth Bird" was previewed by Dom Alessio on Australia's National Broadcaster Triple J's blog on 7 August 2013, where Dom noted, "Following on from the beautiful slow-burner "Forward Miles", MT WARNING are back with the propulsive and rocking "Youth Bird". It features sharp guitar chords, a driving drum rhythm and Mikey Bee's howling vocals."

In 2013, the band played festivals – BIGSOUND in Brisbane, where Scene Magazine described them as "One of the best and most exciting acts of the night."; and also Reeperbahn Festival in Hamburg.

A month before the release of debut album Midnight Set, the band were selected as The Guardian's 'New Band of the Day' with music journalist Paul Lester stating, "Those of you drawn to the sinewy introspection of the National and the revelatory grandeur of Sigur Ros. It is largely traditional and unreconstructed, thoroughly prepostmodern, like Radiohead if they'd never discovered Warp, or even got the Bends."

In March 2014, Midnight Set was released in UK on the 17th, followed by Australia and remaining international markets on the 28th. The album debuted at #8 on the Australian Independent Record Labels Association albums charts and #25 on iTunes Alternative music charts.

Mt Warning performed at Australia's St Jerome's Laneway Festival and Splendour in the Grass, as well as Austin's South by Southwest in 2014.

In July 2015, the band released a new EP called Petrified Heart, which 4ZZZ described in a review, "....dreamy, soft soundscapes and introspective vocals...Petrified Heart runs with a simple perfection."

== In popular culture ==
At the end of 2012, Mt Warning wrote the song "Sinking Sun" for Corona's "From Where You'd Rather Be" advertising campaign, that was directed by Taylor Steele, Corona's Australian Creative Director.

== Members ==
- Mikey Bee – vocals, guitar (2012–present)
- Taylor Steele (filmmaker) – producer (music), visuals (2012–2014)

== Discography ==
=== Singles ===
- 2015: "When It All Bleeds Out"
- 2014: "Midnight Dawn"
- 2013: "Burn Again"
- 2013: "Forward Miles"
- 2013: "Youth Bird"

=== Studio albums ===
Title	Album details	Peak chart positions	Certifications
Title	Album details	AUS	Certifications
Midnight Set	Released: 17 March 2014; Label: Sipping Jetstreams Records (AUS, UK, USA)	8	

=== Extended plays ===
- Petrified Heart (2015)

== Awards ==
Year	Award-giving body	Award	Result
2013	International Fashion Film Awards	"Forward Miles" Best Director	Nominated
