= Years Around the Sun =

American indie/electro band

Years Around the Sun is an American indie/electro band currently signed to Manaloft Records. The group was formed in 2004 by Ronnie Dudek and Dylan Raasch who are based out of San Diego, California and Portland, Oregon respectively.

== History ==
Formed as a side project in 2004, Dylan Raasch and Ronnie Dudek enlisted long time friends, Chris Cote to play drums and classical pianist, Mia Stefanko to play keys and piano and began work on their first EP, Introstay. With songs featured in several surf films, the group caught the attention of popular film director Taylor Steele (filmmaker) who asked the band to write a song for his upcoming film, "Sipping Jetstreams". The band recorded Heart Delay for the film and soon gained international recognition. With the release of Inva De Siva in 2008, the group did small tours in California. In 2010, the group recorded three more songs for Steele's follow up film, "Castles in the Sky". The band released their second full-length album, Incarnation, on January 1, 2012.

== Discography ==
EPs

- Introstay (2005)

Albums

- Inva De Siva (2008)
- Incarnation (2012)

Soundtracks

- Castles in the Sky (2010)

Remixes

- Ginormous / Protist Remix (2009)

Singles

- Heart Delay - Sipping Jetstreams (2008)
- Miles Away (Acoustic Edit) (2010)

== Music videos ==
- Heart Delay (2007)
- Failing at Art (2008)
- Miles Away (2010)
