= See You Soon (Wisp song) =

Single by Wisp

from the EP Pandora
- Released: January 24, 2024
- Genre: Shoegaze; alternative rock
- Length: 3:38
- Label: Music Soup; Interscope
- Songwriter: Natalie R. Lu
- Producer: Grayskies

Wisp singles chronology
"Once Then We'll Be Free" (2023)	"See You Soon" (2024)	"Enough for You" (2024)

Music video
- "See you soon" on YouTube

"See You Soon" (stylized in sentence case) is a song by the American shoegaze musician Wisp. It was released on January 24, 2024, through Music Soup and Interscope Records as the second single off her debut extended play (EP) Pandora (2024). It is an alternative rock track that incorporates elements of dream pop, and is characterized by its "swirling, distorted guitars", Wisp's "airy vocals", and the "purgative" release in the chorus. A music video co-directed by Nick Vernet and Sophia Álverez had accompanied the single's release.

== Background and recording ==
Following the release of her debut single, "Your Face", in April 2023, the song had gone viral on TikTok. Wisp began working on new material that would become Pandora in June 2023. She worked on material at home and in Los Angeles, until the EP's release. Wisp later released the track "Once then we’ll be free" in October 2023. Due to her songs often dealing with negative topics, Wisp planned to write a happier song with "See You Soon". The song's central theme is based on an individual being besotted with a certain person and wanting to spend time with them.

== Production and composition ==
Wisp wrote "See You Seen" with production handled by independent producer Grayskies. "See You Soon" is 3 minutes and 38 seconds long; it is an alternative rock song that draws from a variety of genres, such as emo, nu-gaze, and bedroom pop. Ashley Bardhan of Pitchfork said the track started with the sound of "whistling wind". While Consequence's Eddie Fu said the song "builds toward a cathartic release in the chorus"; and that Wisp's vocals were "airy".

== Critical reception ==
"See You Soon" was met with "generally positive" reviews from critics. Megan Armstrong at Uproxx felt that the song’s verses gathered "momentum deliberately with a swirl of chorus-effects and glide guitar modulation". While Ones to Watch's Alessandra Rincon felt the song opened with "deep, tension-filled bass lines, towering guitar riffs".

== Personnel ==
Credits adapted from Apple Music and Tidal.

- Wisp – vocals, songwriting
- Grayskies – programming, production
