= Kraus (shoegaze musician) =

American shoegaze musician

- Birth name: Will Kraus
- Born: 1994 or 1995 (age 30–31)
- Genres: Noise rock, noise pop, dream pop, shoegaze
- Years active: 2016–present
- Labels: Terrible Records

William Kraus (born 1994 or 1995), known mononymously as Kraus, is an American shoegaze musician. He is best known for his second studio album, Path (2018). Since 2024, he has produced for other artists, such as Wisp, Glaive, and Photographic Memory.

== Career ==
Kraus grew up in Dallas. As a child, he listened to Good Charlotte, and the Linkin Park fandom encouraged him to produce music, initially in the form of hip-hop and electronic beats. Around 2010, he was introduced to Sigur Rós, "broadening his aesthetic scope", and he later discovered Odd Future, Danny Brown, and A$AP Rocky. Around 2012, Kraus decided he wanted to pursue music as a career. He went on to attend college at the Clive Davis Institute of Recorded Music at New York University.

Kraus started working on his first album, End Tomorrow, in early 2016. After finishing it, he emailed several labels and music writers. Brian Justie from Terrible Records accepted to release the album. End Tomorrow was released on September 9 that year. On September 28, a music video for the song "Pitch Fucker" was premiered by Stereogum. Kraus released "Reach" as a single of his second album Path on February 7, 2018. The album's second single, "Bum", was released on February 28. Path was released on March 9. Ian Cohen of Pitchfork gave a 7.3/10 review, and Chicago Reader's Leor Galil also talked positively about the album. He released a music video for "Bum" on June 6. On the 28th, he released "More", a single from his EP Idyll, released on July 27, 2018.

On July 8, 2021, Kraus released "Glass Valley" as a single of his upcoming third album, View No Country. He also released the singles "VNC", "Given" and "Redshift". The full album was released on October 22. On December 5, he released the album Never Structures using pseudonym Saline. On March 5, 2022, Kraus released Eye Escapes, a collection of recordings from 2016 to 2021, mostly from a lost album between Path and View No Country. On February 27, 2023, Kraus released the EP Anything Else.

Kraus produced and co-wrote Wisp's "Pandora", which was included in her EP of the same name released on April 5, 2024. He has also recently worked on other tracks such as "Living Proof (That It Hurts)" from Glaive's 2024 EP A Bit of a Mad One, as well as "Winter" and "Spill" from Photographic Memory's 2025 album I Look at Her and Light Goes All Through Me.

== Musical style and legacy ==
Kraus has been described as a noise rock, noise pop, dream pop and shoegaze musician and has been compared to My Bloody Valentine. Chris DeValle of Stereogum said that End Tomorrow is "a bombastic technicolor headfuck built from insane drums, celestial dreampop surges, and heavily processed vocals." In 2022, Stereogum mentioned Kraus in an article about "the new wave of American shoegaze".

== Discography ==
Studio albums

- End Tomorrow (2016)
- Path (2018)
- View No Country (2021)
- Never Structures (as Saline; 2021)

Compilation albums

- Eye Escapes (2022)

Extended plays

- Idyll (2018)
- Anything Else (2023)

Singles

- "Reach" (2018)
- "Bum" (2018)
- "More" (2018)
- "Glass Valley" (2021)
- "VNC" (2021)
- "Given" (2021)
- "Redshift" (2021)
