= DFTK =

Studio album by Yung Kayo
- Released: February 4, 2022
- Recorded: 2022
- Genres: Rage; trap
- Length: 35:10
- Label: Young Stoner Life Records
- Producers: Aldn; J Gramm; Paskkal the Landlord; Taurus; umru; Warpstr

Yung Kayo chronology
Working In Progress (2021)	DFTK (2022)	Nineteen (2022)

Singles from DFTK
- 1. "It's a Monday" Released: January 17, 2022; 2. "Yeet (with Yeat)" Released: January 28, 2022

DFTK (an initialism for Down For The Kount) is the debut studio album by American rapper Yung Kayo. It was released through Young Stoner Life Records and 300 Entertainment on February 4, 2022. It serves as the follow-up to his 2021 EP working in progress. The album features guest appearances from Eartheater, Gunna and Yeat, with music production that was primarily handled by Warpstr, alongside Aldn, J Gramm, Paskkal the Landlord, Taurus and umru.

DTFK is a rage rap style album which also blends bits of hyperpop with experimental pop, it’s characterized by its ungovernable energy, chaotic vocal experimentation, and emphasis on sound design and performance over traditional storytelling. The album generated positive reviews from media critics for its production, creativity, and experimentation.

== Background ==
The album was first announced in 2020. Following its release, DFTK didn't have much promotion or teasing before its release; however, in an interview with HotNewHipHop, Kayo stated, "Album is coming soon, tape’s on the way. I’m having this shit by the end of 2021, videos, all of that shit. You dig? Slatt." Additionally, in the interview with Our Generation Music, Kayo stated why he took so long to release the project, with the rapper saying: “I just like to make stuff right… I like to make shit come out how I want it to come out. Especially if it’s gonna be put out for people that have been waiting on something, I just want it to be the right way for them… It would be disrespectful to do it any other way.”

== Composition and lyricism ==
=== Overview ===
DFTK is a rage rap album, it is characterized by AutoTune, sound design, hazy, immersive soundscapes, raging and chaotic energy, as well as a "vibes first" construction. Consisting of 15 tracks, the album has three features from Yeat, who appears on "Yeet" (stylized in all caps), Gunna, who's on "Everything's New (stylized in all lowercase), as well as Eartheater, who's on "Hear You" (also stylized in all lowercase).

=== Songs ===
Paul A. Thompson of Pitchfork wrote how "Believer" features emotional couplets. At the same time, "Crystal Clear" focuses on a more aggressive approach to finishing opponents, claiming how his shooters will "kill for the blue bills". He also highlights how the song has its funny moments, quoting the line: "“Your homeboy, he run out of Oxys/Me and my bitch, we keep doing the opposite.” Writing about how bizarre yet effective the track's structure is. “Over” is less about the song itself and more about how it functions within the album’s structure. "Hear You" sees Kayo go for a more experimental pop approach following the invite of Eartheater on the track. Nadine Smith of Pitchfork wrote how the track sees "Kayo leaves the material realm, ascending to a dimension of pure light and sound." Zach Weingarten of Medium wrote how the track is a "freaked-out electronic music" song. Alex Zidel of HotNewHipHop wrote how Yeet is a heavy track which sees Yung Kayo explore a range of new sounds. Nimai Kumar of Our Generation Music wrote how "It's a Monday" sees Yung Kayo and Gunna approach a sample-heavy instrumental" with "a healthy combination of rapping and singing." He also wrote how the track is a motivational banger.

== Release and promotion ==
The album was released on February 4, 2022. Before its release, there was a listening party for the album, which was hosted in Washington D.C., which is Yung Kayo's hometown.

== Critical reception ==
Professional ratings
Review scores
Source	Rating
Pitchfork	8.2/10

Upon release, DFTK received critical acclaim. Paul A. Thompson of Pitchfork rated the album 8.2 out of 10, praising it for its high energy, experimentation, and emphasis on sound design. A staff member for BrooklynVegan praised DFTK writing how its "inventive melodies and production styles" make the album a good listen.. Pitchfork rated the track "Hear You" with Eartheater at #78 out of #100 on their best songs of 2022, with Nadine Smith writing how Eartheater's inhuman vocal range makes for a symbiotic duet with Kayo’s. Zach Weingarten was fairly positive about the album, writing how unique it was. He wrote how in that moment of space and time, Yung Kayo was "light itself". Raphael Helfand of The Fader wrote how the project saw Kayo go into a completely different lane compared to his 300 Entertainment contemporaries.

== Track listing ==
All tracks are written by Malachi Green and Ethan Andrade, and produced by Warpstr. Additional producers are listed below.

DFTK track listing
No.	Title	Writer(s)	Producer(s)	Length
1.	"Down (One Kount)"	Alden Gardner Robinson	Aldn	2:16
2.	"Save Her"			1:54
3.	"Yeet" (featuring Yeat)	Noah Olivier Smith		2:37
4.	"iPic"			1:56
5.	"Everything New" (featuring Gunna)	Sergio Giavanni Kitchens; Julian Gramma	J Gramm	2:25
6.	"Who You Gon' Call"			2:35
7.	"Believer"			2:40
8.	"Hear You"	Alexandra Audrey Drewchin; Umru Rothenberg	Umru	2:41
9.	"Over"	Taurus Bucy Currie Jr	Taurus	1:25
10.	"Freak"			1:55
11.	"Crystal Clear"			2:13
12.	"No Sense"			3:04
13.	"Kiko"	Pascal Lee	Paskkal The Landlord	2:19
14.	"WYA"			2:29
15.	"It's a Monday"			2:22
Total length:				31:47

=== Notes ===
- All tracks besides "Yeet" are stylized in lowercase.
