= Path (album) =

Studio album by Kraus
- Released: March 9, 2018
- Genre: Shoegaze
- Length: 33:22
- Label: Terrible
- Producer: Will Kraus

Kraus chronology
End Tomorrow (2016)	Path (2018)	View No Country (2021)

Singles from Path
- 1. "Reach" Released: February 7, 2018; 2. "Bum" Released: February 28, 2018

Path is the second studio album by the American musician Kraus, released on March 9, 2018, through Terrible Records. Preceded by singles "Reach" and "Bum", Path follows Kraus's debut End Tomorrow on the same label. A shoegaze album, reviewers noted the album's influence from 1990s alternative rock, evoking a vibe akin to My Bloody Valentine. Path was described as "intriguing" by Pitchfork and "gorgeous" by Revolver.

== Background and release ==
Kraus started working on his debut studio album, End Tomorrow, in early 2016. After finishing it, he emailed several labels and music writers. Brian Justie from Terrible Records agreed to release the album. End Tomorrow was released through the label on September 9, 2016. An interview published in January 2017 by Pitchfork noted that, while Kraus was "in no rush to release a new record", he had a playlist titled "Album 2" containing work-in-progress songs. According to Quinn Moreland, these sketches "contain[ed] more of the ambitious instrumentation and ambiguous yet heartfelt songwriting [that was] becoming his signature". Path was preceded by two singles: "Reach" on February 7, 2018, and "Bum" on February 28. Path was released on March 9. A music video for "Bum", which Fred Pessaro of Revolver described as colorful, was released on June 6.

== Composition ==
Path was characterized as shoegaze; Joe Trainor of Bandcamp Daily described it as "experimental shoegaze". Writing for Pitchfork, Ian Cohen described the album's 1990s alternative rock vibe as its most unique aspect, writing how "about 70 percent of Path" could be confused for the heaviest instrumental sections of The Smashing Pumpkins's Siamese Dream. Further, he highlighted the combination of "arena-rock volume, nu-metal digital dreams, and bedroom artist claustrophobia", keeping Path engaging. Trainor described it as "rock music using modern tech to create exciting new sounds". Fred Pessaro of Revolver said that the album evokes My Bloody Valentine's "noisy cacophony and lovely melody" while containing modern effects. Chicago Reader's Leor Galil felt that Kraus's melancholic and resonant vocals, along with the sorrowful lyrics, were more distinct than the ones present in End Tomorrow. Cohen highlighted how Kraus sounds like a "fully staffed rock band", despite the project being composed of only one person.

== Songs ==
On Path's first and last tracks, "Figure" and "Mostly", Cohen said that "Kraus's coos are enveloped by gritty, spun-sugar drones", feeling that they are as expressive as the other songs in the record, despite being wordless. On the latter track, Galil described it as "weightless" and "near-ambient" while containing indistinguishable vocals. "Bum" encapsulates the album's essence, according to Pessaro, being both sweet and sinister, with a recurring, distorted guitar line. Chris DeVille of Stereogum described it as "Kraus barreling through beautiful explosions of noise and melody". Cohen found it inspired by Hum's "Stars".

Cohen said that the intro of "Games" resembles the Big Pink and Red Hot Chili Peppers' "Give It Away". Overall, he felt that the song blends chillwave with Clinton-era nostalgia by alluding to an X Games VHS recording, while accompanied by energetic guitar work. Sasha Geffen of Pitchfork and Stereogum's Sophie Israelsohn noted that "Reach" has frantic drums as Kraus repeatedly sings "Reaching through me". Geffen described the guitar as "fuzzed-out", while Isrealsohn found Kraus's voice airy, yet expressive. Cohen said that "See" offers "a bedside elegy as a narcotized singsong". On "Big Blood", Galil wrote that when combined with its powerful guitars, euphoric drums, and samples creating melodies "that cut through the atmosphere like a foghorn", Kraus's "vocal caterwauling" enhances the track's strength.

== Reception and legacy ==
Professional ratings
Review scores
Source	Rating
Pitchfork	7.3/10

Revolver's Fred Pessaro wrote that Path "caused a stir" when it was released. Ian Cohen of Pitchfork wrote: "Shoegaze doesn't need ego, but Path shows it's always better with personality", saying that it was "one of the more intriguing entries into shoegaze of recent vintage". Chicago Reader's Leor Galil said that Kraus "expresses himself even more clearly" when compared to End Tomorrow while highlighting that the artist "continues to do well at keeping his ideas—and words—as intangible as possible". Pessaro described it as "mildly antisocial and downright gorgeous to the core, like a sweet lullaby being sung across a crackling radio".

In 2023, Joe Trainor of Bandcamp Daily included it in a list of "rare shoegaze gems".

== Track listing ==
All tracks are written by Will Kraus.

No.	Title	Length
1.	"Figure"	2:38
2.	"Bum"	2:28
3.	"Games"	3:12
4.	"Grow"	2:10
5.	"Reach"	2:20
6.	"Follow"	3:11
7.	"Brief Skin"	2:18
8.	"Outside"	2:37
9.	"See"	3:39
10.	"Big Blood"	3:06
11.	"Watching"	2:35
12.	"Mostly"	3:01
Total length:		33:22

== Release history ==
Release history for Path
Region	Date	Format(s)	Label
Worldwide	March 9, 2018	Digital download; streaming; vinyl	Terrible Records
