= Caledonian Lane =

Street in Melbourne, Victoria

Coordinates: 37.8122°S 144.96454°E

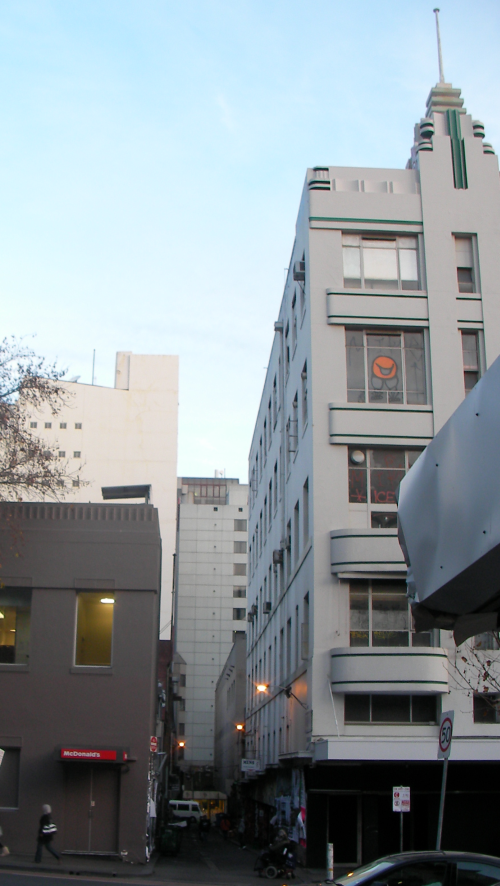
Looking south to Caledonian Lane from Drewery Lane. Lonsdale House is the five storey art deco tower on the right, which was demolished in 2010 for Emporium Melbourne.

Caledonian Lane is a street in the Melbourne central business district. It is a short, quiet and narrow (4 metre wide) open laneway, running between Little Bourke and Lonsdale streets. The alley has been a street artists’ favourite for years and is often referred to as the 'gaming laneway' hosting various gaming murals.

It is named after the Caledonian Hotel originally owned and operated by Robert Omond in 1841. Prior to being run as a hotel it was a residence built by JP Clow. Caledonian Lane is most notable as the former home to the St Jerome's Laneway Festival. It is also notable due to controversial developments in 2009 involving the redevelopment of the Post Office precinct and Department Store precinct also involving the shutting down of both St Jerome's and the festival.

A consortium involving Myer and Colonial First State applied for exemption from the City of Melbourne Heritage Overlay to widen the lane by 4 metres to improve access for delivery trucks and in the process demolish the Art Deco Lonsdale House in 2009. Permission was granted by both the City of Melbourne and the State planning minister Justin Madden MP on 24 July 2009 under controversial circumstances. In response to the demolition for the sake of lane widening, a preservation group called Save Lonsdale House formed in late 2009.

Until 2004, Caledonian Lane was home to a number of small independent store owners, however the buildings were sold under vacant possession in 2007.

The lane is bitumen with a small strip blue stone cobbled gutter, has street lighting attached to Lonsdale House and is by both pedestrian and vehicular traffic, mainly delivery trucks. Caledonian Lane forms a vista toward both Loudon Place to the south and Drewery Lane to the north, both are almost directly opposite.
