= Peter Bibby =

Australian musician (born 1988)

- Born: July 21, 1988 (age 38); Perth, Western Australia
- Genres: Indie rock; psychedelic pop
- Occupations: Musician; singer-songwriter
- Instruments: Guitar; vocals
- Years active: 2008–present
- Label: Spinning Top Music

Peter Bibby (born July 21, 1988) is an Australian songwriter and musician. His songs deal with themes of drinking and working-class culture in Australia. He has performed at Laneway Festival, SXSW, and All Points East. Bibby has released four albums, Butcher / Hairstylist / Beautician in 2014, Grand Champion in 2018, Marge in 2020, and Drama King in 2024.

== History ==
Bibby started his musical career as a busker in his native Perth before forming the group Frozen Ocean, and eventually performing as a solo artist.

His debut album, Butcher / Hairstylist / Beautician, was released in 2014. Writing for The Music, Brendan Telford opined "Bibby paints a deliciously perturbing picture of Australian shambolic chic."

Bibby's sophomore album, Grand Champion, was released in 2018. Reviewing the album for KTSW, Samuel Cravey wrote "The album is one heck of a good listen, and its seemingly ironic title Grand Champion aids immensely in selling Bibby’s iconic, slightly-screwy, Australian singer/songwriter persona."

In 2020, he released the album Marge. "Oceans" was released as a single and featured an accompanying music video. The song was included on the Consequence list New Music Friday: 7 Songs You Need to Hear on May 8, 2022.

In 2024, Bibby released the album Drama King. Writing for The Mancunion, Daniel Tothill called the album "a testament to his contradictory nature and kaleidoscopic inspirations, resulting in a joyously varied and unexpected record." Writing for Louder Than War, MK Bennet shared that "The consistent mix and flow of the tracks is seamless, production perfect, a time capsule of twenty-first-century songwriting with its beautiful and broken souls fading into the history of its narrative."

== Personal life ==
Bibby has worked as a bricklayer.

== Discography ==
- Drama King, 2024
- Marge, 2020
- Grand Champion, 2018
- Butcher / Hairstylist / Beautician, 2014
