= Matt Kleiner =

American film director and photographer (born 1981)

Matt Kleiner (born January 7, 1981) is an American film director and photographer whose work includes film, music videos, commercials and print publications. His commercial clients include Red Bull, Sony Music, ESPN, Universal Records, Fuel TV, Subaru. He is best known for his award-winning film series Way of the Ocean, a five-part geographical look at surf and ocean life style around the globe. He is currently the creative director for Circulate Motion Pictures.
