= Spike Fuck =

Australian singer-songwriter

- Origin: Melbourne, Victoria, Australia
- Genres: New wave, post-punk, alt-country
- Years active: 2015–2020, 2024-present
- Labels: Sacred Bones Records, Partisan Records
- Website: spikefck.world

Spike Fuck (sometimes stylised as SPIKE FCUK & SPIKE F*CK) is an Australian musician from Melbourne.

== History ==
=== 2015–2018: early work and The Smackwave EP ===
Raised in Melbourne, he began performing as Spike Fuck in 2015. He began performing solo with a backing track, a microphone, and a confrontational stage presence. His debut EP, The Smackwave EP, was released in June 2016: a five-song work addressing heroin addiction, mental illness and heartbreak. He has described it as an impersonation of a washed-up middle aged rock star attempting a comeback in the 1960s or 1970s.

In mid-2017, Spike released the standalone country single "Greatest Hits (Suicide Party)", featuring Graham "Evil" Lee of The Triffids. The track was written during a six-month period in a disused bank that doubled as a studio in Melbourne. That same year, he was discovered by a Rick Owens scout and flown to Paris for an interview and photoshoot.

In 2018, Spike lost his father. A period of personal difficulty — including a mental health crisis resulting in hospitalisation — led to a prolonged withdrawal from public life.

=== 2019–2023: Partisan Records signing and hiatus ===
In 2019, Spike signed to Partisan Records and re-released The Smackwave EP alongside the new single "Body by Crystal", which he described as having an "over-produced pop-punk sound, like End of the Century-era Ramones". In August 2020, he released "Kind Hearts", a duet with Melbourne band The Slingers.

=== 2024–present: return ===
Spike returned to active recording and live performance in 2024. On 24 December 2024 he released the single "Other Right Hand of the Lord", followed by "Eternity & Time" in May 2025. Both tracks reflect a deepened engagement with Catholic faith and spirituality; in an interview with Hero Magazine, he stated that when engaging with Catholicism as an adult he was "drawn to its traditional forms, as there appeared to be so much more depth of inspiration there." In October 2025, he released Live from Underground, a live recording.

== Musical style ==
Spike Fuck draws from proto-punk and classic punk influences combined with late 1970s new wave and post-punk elements, and country or singer-songwriter sensibilities. He cites Roky Erickson and Scott Walker as important influences.

== Discography ==
=== Studio albums ===
Title	Details	Peak chart positions
Title	Details	AUS
Evidence	Released: October 2026; Label: Sacred Bones (SBR384CD)	41

=== Extended plays ===
Title	Details
The Smackwave EP	Released: 2016; Re-released: 2019; Label: Partisan

=== Singles ===
Title	Year	Notes
"Greatest Hits (Suicide Party)"	2017	Features Graham "Evil" Lee of the Triffids
"Body by Crystal"	2019	
"Kind Hearts"	2020	Duet with the Slingers
"Other Right Hand of the Lord"	2024	
"Eternity & Time"	2025	

=== Live albums ===
Title	Year	Label
Live from Underground	2025	Partisan Records
