= Astreal =

Indie rock band

- Origin: Singapore, Singapore
- Genres: Post-rock, dream pop, noise pop, shoegazing
- Years active: 1992–present
- Labels: Cheapskate, Wallwork
- Members: Ginette Chittick; Muhammad Alkhatib; Jason Ang; Joseph Chian
- Past members: Pagit Yong; William de Silva; Alwyn Lim

Astreal are an indie rock band, most often associated with the genres of post rock, shoegazing, and noise pop.

The band formed in Singapore in 1992, although some date their origins to 1992 with their first incarnation as Breed. They are known for their incendiary live performances, as well as for being one of Singapore's first indie rock bands fronted by a female vocalist. Although they cite My Bloody Valentine, Slowdive, and Curve as influences, it is also known that past and current members have interests in industrial rock, death metal, black metal and electronica.

The current members are Ginette Chittick (bass/vocals), Muhammad Alkhatib (guitars), Joseph Chian (drums) and Jason Ang (keyboards/synths).

== History ==
The original Astreal line-up were formerly known as Breed, consisting of members Pagit Yong (vocals), Muhammad Alkhatib (guitars), William de Silva (bass), and Alwyn Lim (drums). Formed in 1992 among junior college friends, it is rumored that their initial name was derived from the Godflesh track 'Like Rats'. They recorded two rare cassette EPs, Dive Gemma and Chlorine Explosion, during this period. Pagit left the band in 1994. The remaining core of the band consisting of Alkhatib, William, and Alwyn would remain consistent until 2002.

With the departure of their vocalist, the remaining members recruited Melissa Lim as their vocalist and decided on a new band name, 'Astreal'. This line-up recorded the album Ouijablush which was released by Pony Canyon's Singapore subsidiary. Melissa left the band in 1999.

Astreal's search for a new vocalist ended soon after with the recruitment of Ginette Chittick, a bass player formerly with female punk rockers PsychoSonique. With Ginette handling vocal and bass duties, William switched to the guitar and became notorious for his use of multiple effects gadgets, creating coruscating sheets of noise at live performances. During this period, Astreal's signature sound would take a darker-sounding orientation due to the new direction of the band's sonic template. It was also this period where the band wrote several of the songs, including 'Projektion', 'Wallflower', and 'Losing You', that would go into the making of their second album. William left the band in 2003 due to musical differences.

With William's departure, the band recruited Nick Chan as a second guitarist and producer to continue writing and performing. Alwyn left the band in 2003 to pursue a doctorate in sociology. Reduan Hussin was added soon after as a replacement drummer and the band got down to writing This is Dormant, Lover and the Sea, Ceremony and With Child. The band released their second album, Fragments Of The Same Dead Star in 2006 on Wallwork Records, distributed by EMI.

Nick Chan and the band then parted ways at the end of 2006. The band went on to be nominated for the Street Style Awards at the end of '06 and played several well received shows, Lime Sonic Bang, ZoukOut, Crossborders Kuala Lumpur and Explore Singapore as a three piece.

After remaining under the radar for several months in the early part of 2007, Astreal performed their first solo show 'Lover and the Sea' at the Recital Studio Esplanade. The show saw the introduction of Jason Ang as keyboardist and fourth member of the band. The title of the show is said to symbolise new beginnings.

Juice magazine named Astreal the best band of 2007.

On March 12, 2009, with the debut of new drummer Joseph Chian, Astreal played on Channel 5's 'Live n Loaded.'

As 2017 approached, Astreal released their third studio album 10 years after Fragments of the Same Dead Star. The new album titled Light, coincided with their appearance at the Laneway Festival Singapore where singer Ginette DJed at back in 2011 and a performance at Baybeats once again.

Astreal returned to Baybeats once again in pandemic-era 2020 with a show that was live-streamed to audiences online.

== Discography ==
=== Studio albums ===
- "Ouijablush" (1997)
- "Fragments of the Same Dead Star" (2006)
- "Light" (2017)
