= Aldn =

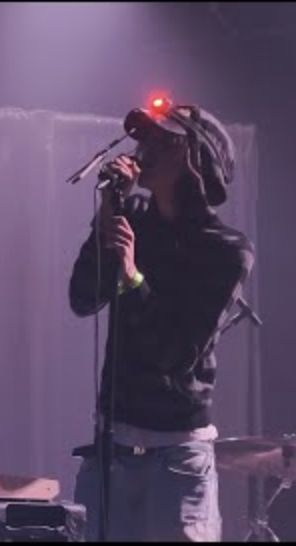
- Aldn performing in New York City, New York in 2025

Background information
- Born: Alden Gardner Robinson; May 10, 2001 (age 25); Reston, Virginia, U.S.
- Genres: Hyperpop; digicore
- Occupations: Singer; songwriter; record producer
- Years active: 2019–present
- Labels: Pack; Geffen; (former)

Alden Gardner Robinson (born May 10, 2001), professionally known as Aldn (stylized in all lowercase), is an American singer, songwriter and record producer. He rose to prominence in the early underground digicore scene.

== Early life ==
Alden Robinson was born on May 10, 2001 and raised in Reston, Virginia. At age 11, Robinson began producing music using an Ableton launchpad. While in high school, he played cello in the school orchestra. Robinson attended Virginia Commonwealth University, where he began uploading music on SoundCloud.

== Career ==
Robinson released his first song "Glittr" in 2020, the song gaining popularity within the underground digicore scene, with his fast-paced instrumentals. He would then release his single "Redeyes" with friend and fellow hyperpop music artist Glaive. He and Glaive would collab again later for the song "What Was The Last Thing U Said", that would join his first single, "Glittr", on debut album, Greenhouse.

He released an extended play (EP) titled Predictable in 2021. In February of 2022, Aldn also co-produced "Down (one kount)" with Warpstr, a track by Yung Kayo off his project DFTK. That same year, he also went on to release his projects Good Grief in May, and Post Spring Self Destruction in November through Geffen Records and Simple Stupid Records. In June 2022, Robinson would release a music video combining his singles "Acceptance," and "Denial" off the 2022 EP Good Grief. Robinson opened for Glaive's Old Dog, New Tricks Tour in 2022.

In 2023, Robinson would release The End, an EP featuring singles "Headstrong Gunner", "Pressure" with Chloe Moriondo, and "Sub 32".

Robinson would then, a year later, release his first single off his new album, Strung Out Symphony, titled "Icantbelieveiletyougetaway". The single would quickly start gaining traction on TikTok, boosting his popularity.

Robinson released Strung Out Symphony, his first studio album with Pack Records, on October 3, 2025.

== Discography ==
=== Studio albums ===
Title	Album details
Strung Out Symphony	Released: October 3, 2025; Label: Pack Records; Format: Digital download, streaming

=== Extended plays ===
Title	Album details
Greenhouse	Released: July 16, 2021; Label: Pack Records; Format: Digital download, streaming
Predictable	Released: November 17, 2021; Label: Geffen Records, Simple Stupid; Format: Digital download, streaming
Good Grief	Released: May 11, 2022; Label: Geffen Records, Simple Stupid; Format: Digital download, streaming
Post Spring Self Destruction	Released: November 11, 2022; Label: Geffen Records, Good Luck Have Fun, Simple Stupid; Format: Digital download, streaming
The End	Released: July 21, 2023; Label: Geffen Records, Good Luck Have Fun, Simple Stupid; Format: Digital download, streaming

=== Singles ===
==== As lead artist ====
Title	Year	Album
"So Easy"	2019	Non-album singles
"Comeover/Flu"	2020	Non-album singles
"Missing U From Quarantine"	2020	Non-album singles
"Glittr"	2020	Non-album singles
"Srry#"	2020	Non-album singles
"Redeyes"	2020	Non-album singles
"This Songs Not About U"	2020	Non-album singles
"Ifls"	2020	Non-album singles
"I Always Cared"	2020	Non-album singles
"Precious"	2020	Non-album singles
"I Do It All Again"	2020	Non-album singles
"Zombie"	2020	Non-album singles
"What Was The Last Thing U Said" (featuring Glaive)	2021	Non-album singles
"I'm Alright"	2021	Non-album singles
"Happy Ever After" (featuring Midwxst)	2021	Non-album singles
"Predictable"	2021	Non-album singles
"N2O"	2021	Non-album singles
"Tellmewhatuwant"	2022	Non-album singles
"Sink"	2022	Non-album singles
"Ignorance Is Bliss"	2022	Non-album singles
"Sydney"	2022	Non-album singles
"Say What U Mean" (featuring Riovaz)	2022	Non-album singles
"Fall At The Same Time"	2022	Non-album singles
"Biteback" (with Aldrch)	2022	Non-album singles
"Headstrong Gunner"	2023	Non-album singles
"Pressure" (featuring Chloe Moriondo)	2023	Non-album singles
"Sub 32"	2023	Non-album singles
"Empty Words"	2023	Non-album singles
"Farmers Daughter"	2023	Non-album singles
"Feathers"	2024	Non-album singles
"2016"	2024	Non-album singles
"Sparks" (Coldplay cover)	2024	Non-album singles
"Talking to the Wall"	2024	Non-album singles
"Icantbelieveiletyougetaway"	2024	Strung Out Symphony
"Get Me Hi"	2024	Non-album singles
"Autobiography"	2024	Non-album singles
"Get Us Out Of Here"	2024	Non-album singles
"Push You Away"	2025	Strung Out Symphony
"Miss Me When You're Drunk"	2025	Strung Out Symphony
"Smile Thru It All"	2025	Strung Out Symphony
"Crocodile Eyes" (featuring Wisp)	2025	Strung Out Symphony

==== As featured artist ====
Title	Year	Album
"Chaos Control!" (Sora featuring Aldn)	2020	Non-album singles
"Today" (Kaspar Gem featuring aldn)	2020	Non-album singles
"Doubt Me" (Jace! featuring aldn)	2023	Non-album singles
"Leave A Message" (Flawed Mangoes featuring aldn)	2024	Non-album singles
"Check (feat. aldn)" (vibe advocates featuring aldn)	2025	Non-album singles

=== Production credits ===
List of song production credits, showing year released and album name
Title	Year	Artist(s)	Album
"223s"	2022	midwxst, BabyTron	Back in Action 3.0
"Down (One Kount)"	2022	Yung Kayo	DFTK
