= Taylor Steele (filmmaker) =

American film director and producer

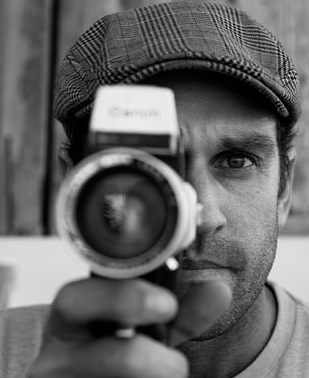
- Taylor Steele on the 12 of January, 2012.
- Born: Taylor Steele; June 7, 1972 (age 53); San Diego County, California, United States
- Occupations: Film director, Film Producer, Music Producer
- Years active: 1990–present http://www.sippingjetstreams.com

Taylor Steele (born 7 June 1972) is a filmmaker. Steele has been involved in the surf film industry for over two decades. He has won awards as both director and producer. His production company, Poor Specimen, has launched the careers of some of surfing's most influential figures and has played a role in the success of bands such as Blink-182, Pennywise, and Jack Johnson, who were introduced in Steele's early movies.

== Early career ==
In 1992, Steele released a 35-minute VHS film entitled Momentum. The film showcases a blend of punk rock music and surfing.

In his early career, Steele collaborated with figures such as Kelly Slater, Shane Dorian, Big Todd Levy and Rob Machado, as well as musicians including Blink-182, Pennywise and The Offspring. In an interview with Tracks Magazine, Blink-182 vocalist Tom DeLonge recalls Steele's contribution to their early success: "[Taylor] was putting our band along with the biggest surfer's in the world and back then Action Sports wasn't really called action sports but that lifestyle was very connected to punk rock music so we had our first really big chance to win over any kind of fans within the surfing and skate boarding community".

Steele's collaboration with the musicians featured in his early films initiated the GoodTimes Tour. The GoodTimes Tour was a concert tour by American rock band in support of GoodTimes, a surf video directed by Taylor Steele. The tour featured bands from the video's soundtrack, including Pennywise, Blink-182, Pivit, Unwritten Law, 7 Seconds and Sprung Monkey. Blink-182 drummer Scott Raynor commented on the tour in 2010: "Honestly, the shows went well. We always got a good reaction, and the next time we came around we had more fans and better floors to sleep on".

Steele's 1999 surf film Loose Change featuring Rob Machado won the Australian Surfing Life Reader's Choice Award.

In 2009, Steele and Rob Machado collaborated to create the film The Drifter. The film won Best Picture at the California Surf Film Festival and the Ombak Bali Festival. The Drifter was also screened at the X-Dance Film Festival in Aspen, Colorado in January.

== Later works ==
After a series of early films including GoodTimes, Loose Change, Arc, Focus, and several others, Taylor's filmmaking shifted focus.

In 2006, Steele made Sipping Jetstreams, a film about travel and surfing. Taylor Steele and photographer Dustin Humphrie's objective was a light, but beautiful, travelogue. Sipping Jetstreams won best cinematography at the X-Dance Film Festival. Sipping Jetstreams the oversize hard-back coffee-table book and the DVD were released in October 2006. In 2010, Steele released Castles in the Sky. It stars Jordy Smith, Dane Reynolds, Rob Machado, Dave Rastovich, Kalani Rob, Dan Malloy, Craig Anderson and others, surfing in the various remote countries around the globe. Each location is characterized by unique landscapes. The soundtrack for Castles in the Sky was recorded on location with musician/surfers; Timmy Curran, Ozzie Wright, and Kelly Slater; in many cases the soundtrack included music from local cultures. Steele has received recognition for his works within the film industry. In 2002, he won the X-Dance award for Best Film, Best Cinematography, and Best Editing for the movie Shelter. That same year acting as executive producer, the film Hallowed Ground was named ESPN's Action Sports Movie of the Year. In addition, Castles in the Sky won Audience Choice award for most Visionary Documentary, and the Beacon Award at the Maui Film Festival. Further more, it was showcased at National Geographic headquarters in 2010. Recently, Steele was voted one of Surfer Magazine's "25 Most Powerful People" and one of Wave Magazine's "Top Ten Most Important People in Surfing".

== Current works ==
Steele's work now includes international brands, music production and art collaborations. Some of which have featured at the Gagosian Gallery NY and the Venice Biennale. Currently underway is the development of Steele's first feature film.

In 2012, Steele worked with artist Richard Phillips to co-direct the short film First Point, starring Lindsay Lohan. Thomas Bangalter from Daft Punk did the score and Jay Rabinowitz who worked on Requiem for a Dream and The Tree of Life, edited the short film.

In 2013, Steele produced the Byron Bay band MT WARNING. Their new single Youth Bird was previewed on Dom Alessio from National Broadcaster Triple J’s blog on 7 August 2013, where Dom noted "Following on from the beautiful slow-burner Forward Miles, MT WARNING are back with the propulsive and rocking Youth Bird. It features sharp guitar chords, a driving drum rhythm and Mikey Bee's howling vocals."

In 2013 and 2014, Steele worked as the Creative Director of Corona for Australia, with a focus on commercial directing.

Steele's most recent film, PROXIMITY, also focused on modern surfing. The film follows eight of the world's best surfers as they search for new waves and deeper understanding in exotic destinations. It stars Kelly Slater, Rob Machado, Shane Dorian, Dave Rastovich, John John Florence, Craig Anderson, Steph Gilmore, and Albee Layer.

In 2014, Steele was named Fast Company (magazine) 100 Most Creative in Business.

Taylor Steele currently lives in New York and directs films, virtual reality movies, and commercials.

== Filmography ==
- 1989: Seaside - School Project
- 1991: One Step Beyond - Limited Release
- 1992: Momentum
- 1993: Momentum 2
- 1994: Focus
- 1994: Factory Seconds
- 1995: Good Times
- 1996: Drifting
- 1996: Friday the 17th
- 1997: The Show - Best Video Surfer Poll Awards
- 1998: All For One
- 1999: Loose Change - Best Film 2000 Readers Choice Award ASL magazine
- 2000: Hit and Run
- 2001: Momentum (2001 film) and Hallowed Ground ( Producer) - ESPN Action Sports Movie Of The Year Award
- 2002: Arc
- 2002: Drive Thru Series (Producer)
- 2003: Campaign
- 2005: Campaign 2
- 2006: Sipping Jetstreams - Best Cinematography X-Dance Film Festival
- 2007: Stranger Than Fiction
- 2007: Trilogy
- 2007: Shelter (Co-directed with Chris Malloy) - Best Director, Film & Editing X-Dance Film Festival
- 2008: Days of Strange (Producer)
- 2009: The Drifter - Best Director X-Dance Film Festival
- 2010: Modern Collective, Producer - Best Video Surfer Poll Awards
- 2010: Castles In The Sky - Most Visionary Documentary Maui Film Festival - Best Cinematography Surfer Poll Awards
- 2011: Innersection (Producer)
- 2012: Here & Now (Producer)
- 2012: This Time Tomorrow - Best Film London Surf Film Festival
- 2013: Missing - Movie of the Year The Australian Surfing Awards and Best Film Florida Surf Festival
- 2017: Proximity (Director) - in partnership with Teton Gravity Research and Garage Films
- 2018: Momentum Generation
