= Pandora (Wisp EP) =

EP by Wisp
- Released: April 5, 2024
- Recorded: 2023–2024
- Studio: Natalie's Room
- Genre: Shoegaze
- Length: 23:36
- Label: Music Soup; Interscope
- Producer: Photographic Memory; Kraus; Grayskies; Elliott Kozel

Wisp chronology
Pandora (2024)	If Not Winter (2025)

Singles from Pandora
- 1. "Your Face" Released: April 4, 2023; 2. "See You Soon" Released: January 24, 2024; 3. "Enough for You" Released: March 15, 2024

Pandora is the debut extended play (EP) by the American musician Wisp, released on April 5, 2024. After rising to prominence with her debut single "Your Face" and subsequently signing to Music Soup and Interscope Records, Wisp began working on new material in June 2023. She collaborated with the producers Photographic Memory, Kraus, Grayskies and Elliott Kozel, and worked on material at home and in Los Angeles.

Pandora is a shoegaze EP that explores themes of romance, greed and sorrow. In addition to "Your Face", the EP was promoted with the singles "See You Soon" and "Enough for You". Between April and May 2024, Wisp embarked on a headlining tour of the United States and supported Panchiko on several dates. Music critics praised Pandora for its take on the shoegaze genre, though some felt it lacked originality and impact.

== Background and recording ==
In 2023, Natalie Lu a.k.a. Wisp released her debut single, "Your Face". After a friend's recommendation, she recorded vocals over an instrumental by the producer Grayskies using a pair of Apple earbuds, despite having no prior experience in music production. The song went viral on TikTok and brought her a cult following, leading to her signing with Interscope Records. It is the first song she had ever written. In June 2023, Wisp began working on new material that would become Pandora. She worked on material at home and in Los Angeles, until the EP's release. "Enough For You" and "See You Soon" were both written in late 2023. Wisp wrote more than 25 songs for the EP, although most of them did not make the final cut.

Wisp usually went into the studio with a reference song in mind, and wrote lyrics when she felt inspired, usually within 20 minutes. Three of the EP's songs started out as instrumentals by Grayskies, with the rest being produced by Max Epstein (a.k.a. Photographic Memory), Elliott Kozel, and Kraus. Though Wisp had experience playing the guitar since she was 16, she initially left the writing of the EP's instrumentals to Epstein and Kozel as she was too shy about her guitar playing. As the recording progressed, she became more involved and began experimenting with guitars, bass, synthesizers, and different tunings. The EP's title track went through numerous structural changes; she said that recording the vocals "came more naturally than usual" on the track. She was most involved in the writing of "Luna", which she began working on with a folk rock song in mind. Due to the majority of her songs dealing with negative topics, she had the goal of writing a happier song with "See You Soon". She worked with members of the band Juggler on "Mimi".

== Composition ==
Music journalists have described Pandora as a shoegaze release. In an interview with Office Magazine, Wisp said she considered her music "shoegaze adjacent" and preferred to categorize it as nu gaze. Its songs feature distorted guitar riffs, as well as ethereal textures and vocals. Ian Cohen of Uproxx felt the songs drew more influence from American-inspired shoegaze such as Hum and Deftones, whilst Andrew Sacher of BrooklynVegan said the production applied a "modern spin" on elements of "classic shoegaze". Thematically, Wisp has described Pandora as being about the "vulnerability and intensity of romantic relationships", unrequited love, as well as greed and sorrow. The EP was named after its title track, which Wisp felt best represented its themes; the song, in turn, was named by the co-producer Kraus after the 2004 video game Tom Clancy's Splinter Cell: Pandora Tomorrow.

Pandora's opening title track begins with an ambient intro before transitioning to a chaotic instrumental featuring "biting" guitars and lyrics exploring unrequited love. A breakdown with electronic drums occurs after its chorus and transitions into its second verse. "Your Face" was written about a person Wisp liked; she said it was about "circumstances that hold you back from expressing your love". The song features murky drums and vocals and was intended by Wisp to sound like "being underwater". Ashely Bardhan of Pitchfork likened its "soaked and distant" vocals to the Deftones, and guitars to Slowdive's second album, Souvlaki (1993). "Enough for You" features looping guitars and windy vocals and is presented from the viewpoint of someone who believes their negative self-perception is true of how others see them. Wisp said the song depicts a "dialogue of self-doubt" with her inner self, and considered it the most vulnerable she had written. According to Jonah Krueger of Consequence, "Luna" explores dream pop and recalls the Cocteau Twins; Spencer Hughes of NME highlighted its "simple but arresting lead hook". Wisp considered it to be thematically similar to Pandora's title track. "See You Soon", which opens with wind sounds, details intense feelings of love that are revealed to be unrequited, with its final line—"To fall so fast, for someone who may never last"—intended by Wisp to represent feelings of "doubt and worry". The final track on Pandora, "Mimi", is about being both in love and a supporter of a performing musician; Wisp felt it was the "most uplifting and sweet song" she had written. Its title was derived from a sleepy sound, which was kept as Wisp and her collaborators found it cute.

== Release and promotion ==
"Your Face", which ended up as the EP's lead single, received a music video on November 21, 2023. On January 24, 2024, "See You Soon" was released as the EP's second single. Wisp announced Pandora and released its third and final single, "Enough for You", on March 15, 2024. The EP was released by Interscope Records on April 5, 2024, with a music video for its title track being released on April 18. Its cover depicts a "bloody snow angel"; Wisp said she wanted to retain mythological tones in her aesthetics. Wisp embarked on a headlining tour of the United States, supported by Photographic Memory on select dates, between April 19 and May 23, 2024. Simultaneously with her own tour, she opened for Panchiko on several dates.

== Critical reception ==
Professional ratings
Review scores
Source	Rating
Pitchfork	6.4/10
Spectrum Culture	55%

For Uproxx, Cohen called Pandora a "assured, reverent collection of sultry shoegaze". KEXP-FM's Chris Sanley called it an "impressive set of maximalist shoegaze […] showcasing an artist whose love of the genre runs deep". Chandler Kennedy of Clash said that the EP "hinges on matters of the heart while also teasing out different aspects of Wisp's work as a producer and songwriter." Sacher, writing for BrooklynVegan, praised the EP's "immediacy" and felt it had broad appeal across older and newer fans of shoegaze. In a more mixed review for Pitchfork, Bardhan criticized the EP's lack of depth, stating that it failed to go above "delicate acts of shoegaze worship" and was repetitious at points. Expressing similar sentiments, Spectrum Culture's Bill Cooper felt that Wisp's performances were lackluster and that the EP was overall forgettable.

== Track listing ==
No.	Title	Writer(s)	Producer(s)	Length
1.	"Pandora"	Natalie Lu; Max Epstein; William Kraus	Photographic Memory; Kraus	4:21
2.	"Your Face"	Lu	Grayskies	3:49
3.	"Enough for You"	Lu	Grayskies	3:05
4.	"Luna"	Lu; Elliott Kozel	Elliott Kozel	3:55
5.	"See You Soon"	Lu; Grayskies	Grayskies	3:40
6.	"Mimi"	Lu; Epstein; Zach CapittiFenton	Photographic Memory	4:43
Total length:				23:36

== Personnel ==
Credits adapted from Tidal.

- Natalie R. Lu - engineering, mastering, mixing, production, composition, lyricist
- Sonny DiPerri - mixer, engineer (all tracks, except "Your Face")
- Kraus - programming, recording engineer
- Max Epstein (a.k.a. Photographic Memory) - production
- Grayskies - producer, composition, lyricist

== Charts ==
Chart performance for Pandora
Chart (2025)	Peak position
UK Independent Albums Breakers (OCC)	7
UK Record Store (OCC)	13
