= Your Face (song) =

2023 single by Wisp

Single by Wisp

from the EP Pandora
- Released: April 4, 2023
- Genre: Shoegaze
- Length: 3:47
- Label: Music Soup; Interscope
- Songwriter: Natalie R. Lu
- Producer: Grayskies

Wisp singles chronology
"Your Face" (2023)	"Tangled Dreams" (2023)

Original cover
- Artwork before Wisp's signing to Interscope Records

Music video
- "Your Face" on YouTube

"Your Face" is a song by the American musician Wisp. It was released on April 4, 2023, through Music Soup and Interscope Records as the lead single from her debut extended play (EP), Pandora (2024). Lu went under the moniker Wisp and had shifted to making music. The song was written by Wisp, while production was handled by Grayskies. It would later gain significant traction on the social media platform TikTok and lead to Wisp signing a record deal with Interscope Records.

Classified as a shoegaze song, "Your Face" is driven by a "metallic luster" of "towering" guitars. Its lyrics revolve around a person whom Wisp loved talking to. A music video taking place underwater was directed by Boni Mata premiered in November 2023. Upon its release, "Your Face" had received generally favorable reviews from music critics, who had praised its production. It peaked at the top ten of the Billboard Hot Hard Rock Songs, and received gold certifications from Pro-Música Brasil (PMB) and the Recording Industry Association of America (RIAA).

== Background and recording ==
After a friend's recommendation, Natalie R. Lu, known professionally as Wisp, had recorded vocals over an instrumental by the independent producer Grayskies, using a pair of Apple earbuds, despite having no prior experience in music production. In a publication by Complex, Lu described how her long-standing love for listening to music led to her becoming an "active participant" when she recorded "Your Face". In an interview with Adam Davidson of Flood Magazine, Wisp explained that she initially composed the song for enjoyment, "When I wrote 'Your Face,' it was honestly just for fun. I was in college at the time and I didn't have any intention of pursuing music." Wisp had noted in a publication by Los Angeles Times that she was interested in making music that people would empathize with, stating "One of my main concerns when 'Your Face' came out was wanting to make music that people could relate to".

== Composition ==
Lu had written "Your Face" alongside the song's producer, Grayskies. "Your Face" is 3 minutes and 47 seconds long. It has been described as a shoegaze song, with elements of nu gaze and alternative rock. The lyrics of "Your Face" see Wisp singing about someone she liked and situations that may restrain that love. Steffanee Wang, writing for Nylon, felt the song had "a banging guitar line and crashing waves of drums and vocals". Lu stated in an interview with Nylon, that while she wishes to keep the true meaning of the song a secret, she "wrote [it] about someone [she] enjoyed talking to" and that it was about "circumstances that hold you back from expressing your love".

== Release and promotion ==
"Your Face" was released on April 4, 2023, through Music Soup and Interscope Records. Wisp had explained how she promoted the "Your Face", saying that "One night when I was scrolling TikTok, I saw that Juggler—another band that's based in LA—had posted a carousel with their song, and I'd never seen people promote music on TikTok like this."

== Reception ==
Writing for Complex, Olive Soki-Kavwahirehi wrote that the song "exemplifies all of the winning properties" of shoegaze, and that it "indicate[s] a very promising future for the young artist". Andy Von Pip of Under the Radar called it "a low-key rock song of the summer". While Jonah Krueger of Consequence said the song taps into a "fuzzy feeling" that was comparable to the "gazing itch of a pedal board".

"Your Face" went viral on TikTok, and has over 80 million streams on Spotify as of November 2024. The song peaked at number 8 on Billboard's Hot Hard Rock Songs chart in 2023, marking Wisp's first top 10 entry. It would also appear at number 24 in the chart's 2024 year end list. The song later culminated at number 7 on the aforementioned chart during the week of March 9, 2024. In the months following its release, Wisp gained a cult following, which led to her signing to Interscope Records. The song was certified certified gold by Pro-Música Brasil (PMB) in 2025, and by the Recording Industry Association of America (RIAA) in 2026.

== Music video ==
A figure seen underwater, the main setting of the song's music video.

The official music video for "Your Face" was released on November 21, 2023, and was directed by Boni Mata. The video takes place underwater. Steffanee Wang of Nylon wrote that it "includes no faces, just bodies swimming and gliding among swaying seaweed" with visuals of a figure with a sheet covering its head and face. Wang had also commented that the "closest" viewers get to see the artist with recurring shots of a figure with a sheet covering its face. The reviewer felt that "the intense obscurity even bleeds into the video's end credits, where all the names are smudged out."

== Credits and personnel ==
Credits are adapted from Tidal.

- Wisp – vocals, songwriting, engineering, recording, mixing, mastering
- Grayskies – programming, production

== Charts ==
=== Weekly charts ===
Weekly chart performance for "Your Face"
Chart (2024)	Peak position
US Hot Hard Rock Songs (Billboard)	7

=== Year-end charts ===
Year-end chart performance for "Your Face"
Chart (2024)	Position
US Hot Hard Rock Songs (Billboard)	24

== Certifications ==
Certifications for "Your Face"
Region	Certification	Certified units/sales
Brazil (Pro-Música Brasil)	Gold	20,000^{‡}
United States (RIAA)	Gold	500,000^{‡}
^{‡} Sales+streaming figures based on certification alone.
