= Wisp (musician) =

American musician (born 2004)

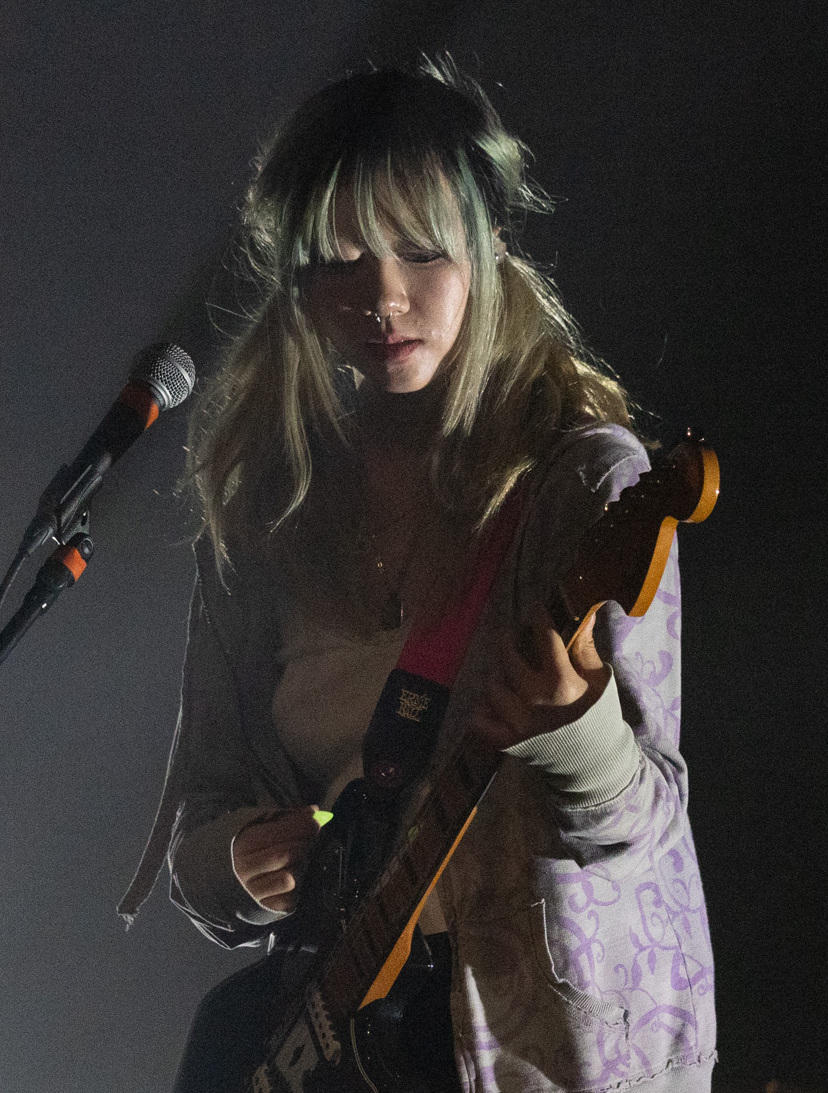
- Wisp performing in San Francisco, California, May 22, 2024
- Born: Natalie R. Lu; August 6, 2004 (age 22)
- Education: SF State University (unfinished)
- Occupations: Singer; songwriter; guitarist
- Years active: 2023–present
- Musical career
- Origin: San Francisco, California, U.S.
- Genres: Shoegaze; zoomergaze; nu gaze; alternative rock
- Instruments: Vocals; guitar; bass; violin; synthesizers; drums
- Works: Wisp discography
- Labels: Music Soup; Interscope
- Website: musicbywisp.com shop.wispmusic.com

Natalie R. Lu (born August 6, 2004), known professionally as Wisp, is an American singer-songwriter and musician. She began releasing music in April 2023, and released her debut single, "Your Face". The track went viral on TikTok and charted on the Billboard Hot Hard Rock Songs Chart. Wisp's debut extended play (EP), Pandora, was released in April 2024, and she later embarked on a headlining tour of the United States and supported British indie rock band Panchiko on several dates. Her debut studio album, If Not Winter, was released in August 2025. On Wisp's musical style, critics often described it as shoegaze, while others classified it as nu gaze.

== Early life ==
Natalie R. Lu was born in 2004, and was raised in the Sunset District neighborhood of San Francisco. She is of Thai and Taiwanese descent. Lu attended Wallenberg High School, where she drew musical inspiration from her modern band class and the yearly music and arts festival. When she started her musical career, Wisp was a computer science major at the San Francisco State University.

== Career ==
=== 2023–2024: Beginnings ===
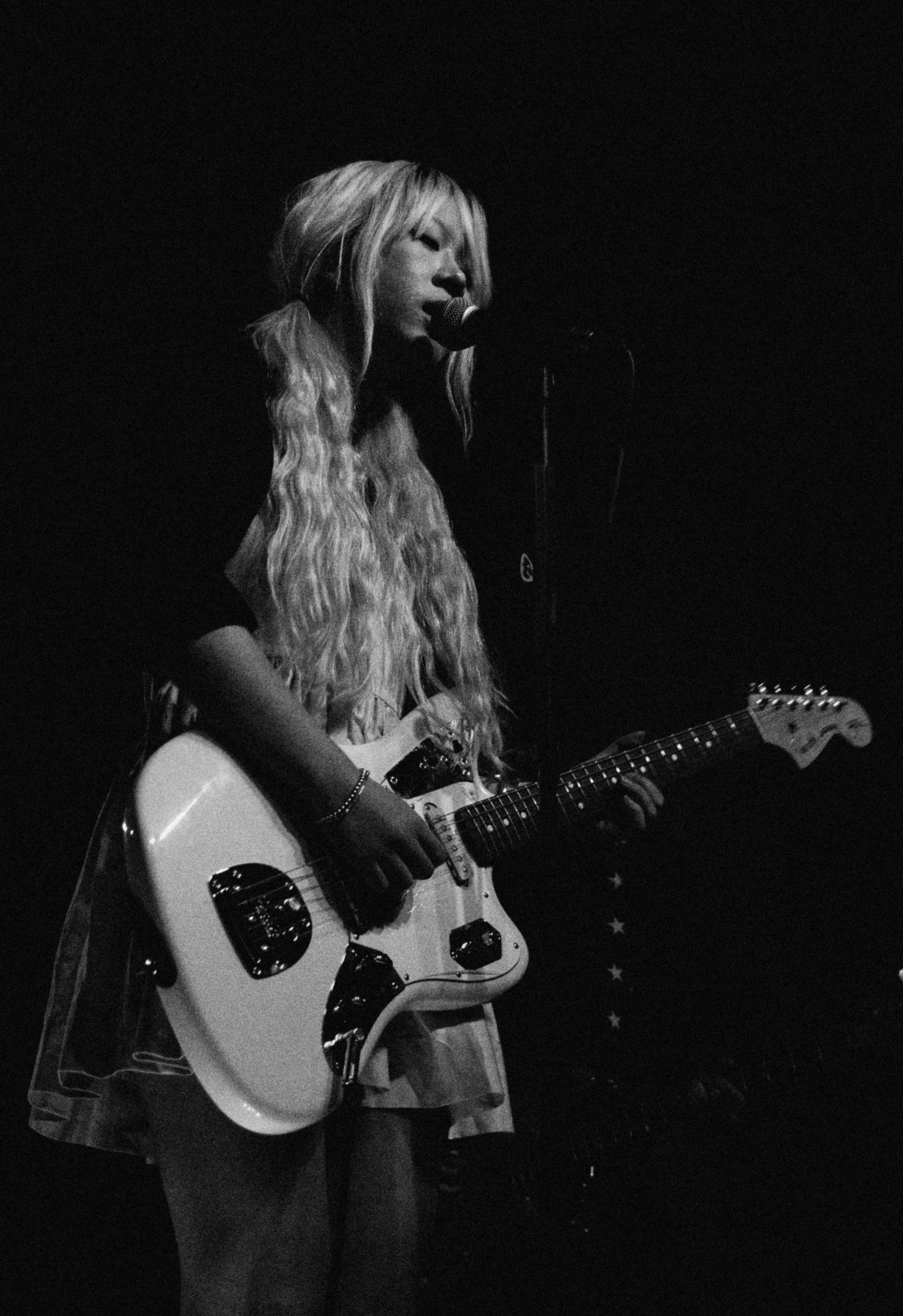
Wisp performing at UC Santa Barbara in 2025

Lu began writing music in April 2023, when she had recorded vocals over an instrumental by the independent record producer Grayskies, using a pair of Apple earbuds, despite having no prior experience in music production. In a publication by Complex, Lu expressed that her "long-standing" love for listening to music had led to her becoming an "active participant", and recording music herself. Wisp released her debut single "Your Face", on April 4, 2023. The song would go viral on TikTok, and later chart at number 8 on the Billboard Hot Hard Rock Songs chart, keeping its position for 15 weeks. In May 2023, she released the song "Tangled Dreams". Later that year, in October, "Once then we’ll be free" was released. A music video directed by Nick Vernet and Boni Mata for "Your Face" had premiered in November 2023, depicting figures underwater.

=== 2024–present: Pandora, If Not Winter ===
In March 2024, Jonah Krueger of Consequence regarded Wisp as the "Next Leader of the Shoegaze Revival". She later released her debut extended play (EP), Pandora, in April 2024. In 2025, she featured on Photographic Memory's single "Heartstyle", from his album I Look at Her and Light Goes All Through Me. Her debut studio album, If Not Winter, was released in August 2025.

== Artistry ==
Wisp's profile at AllMusic describes her music as a "blend of crushing sonics and lighter-than-air vocals", with reviewer Heather Phares saying that "[her] version of shoegaze envelops her listeners". While Abigail Firth of Dork had labelled her "the face of zoomergaze". Wisp prefers to categorize her music as nu-gaze and alternative rock. Her musical influences include Whirr, Ovlov, Title Fight, the Cocteau Twins, Nothing, My Chemical Romance and Deftones. While some critics described "Your Face" as a shoegaze, nu gaze, and alternative rock song, Phares found If Not Winter to be influenced by American rock bands Whirr, Nothing, and Deftones, and felt that Wisp "took her time writing and recording, creating a more dramatic, mature kind of shoegaze" with it. Eli Enis of Stereogum found "Your Face" to be "pounding", saying that while the song may be "foreign to listeners whose genre reference points are the docile Slowdive and blissful Lush", it was "especially popular with the TikTok-era crowd". Pitchfork's Ashley Bardhan had felt that Pandora was a shoegaze EP, and commented on its "wistful" melodies. Venus Rittenberg of Consequence felt that Wisp's vocals flew through the atmospheric tracks of Pandora, and called it a "heavy dream pop influence".

== Discography ==
Studio albums

- If Not Winter (2025)

== Tours ==
- If Not Winter Tour (2025)
