= Soft grunge (music) =

Rock music subgenre

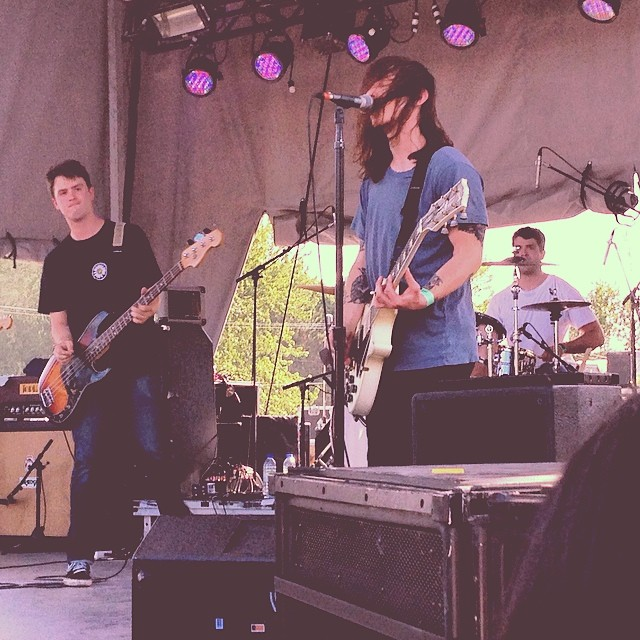
- Title Fight's album Floral Green (2012) and Hyperview (2015) were two of the most influential soft grunge releases.
- Etymology: Soft grunge
- Other names: Emo grunge; Run for Cover sound
- Stylistic origins: Emo; alternative rock
- Cultural origins: Late 2000s–early 2010s, Pennsylvania
- Derivative forms: Nu-gaze; zoomergaze

Subgenres
- Grungegaze

Other topics
- Post-grunge; emo revival; the wave; Defend Pop Punk Era; shoegaze; grunge revival

Soft grunge (or emo grunge) is a rock music subgenre that combines emo with 1990s alternative rock styles, particularly grunge, noise rock and alternative metal. Deriving its name from its popularity on Tumblr's soft grunge communities, the genre emerged as a part of the fourth-wave of emo, pioneered by Philadelphia bands Balance and Composure, Title Fight and Superheaven. Around 2012, soft grunge spread internationally, with Basement, Citizen and Turnover becoming forefront bands. Many of these early groups were signed to Run for Cover Records, leading to the genre's early name, the Run for Cover sound. Around 2016, many prominent soft grunge bands disbanded or pursued different sounds. In response, a second-wave of groups emerged, in America with Microwave, Movements and Fiddlehead, France with Paerish and Britain with Milk Teeth, Muskets and Bloody Knees.

Soft grunge was closely related to the hardcore scene's 2010s shoegaze revival, with both styles performing alongside one another, being signed to the same labels, sharing some musical characteristics and sometimes being conflated by fans and critics. During 2013, soft grunge developed the shoegaze-influenced subgenre grungegaze, which was pioneered by Cloakroom, Narrow Head and Nevermind Me. This became the dominant sound of the third-wave of soft grunge, beginning during the 2020s, including Narrow Head, Modern Color and Glare. Soft grunge and grungegaze were widely influential upon shoegaze in the 2020s, helping to develop the genres nu-gaze and zoomergaze.

== Etymology ==
Prior to the coining of "soft grunge", many fans called the style "emo grunge", and due its prominence on the record label Run for Cover Records, some adopted the name the "Run for Cover sound". "Soft grunge" was coined in reference to the fashion style soft grunge, whose communities on Tumblr the genre was popular with. The term was originally used disparagingly, implying the genre appealed to the site's female teen usership, was overconcered with aesthetics and downplaying its heaviness. Much of its popularity was due to its frequent use by Stuff You Will Hate. Bandcamp Daily writer Adam Feibel called the name "mostly tongue-in-cheek". Sense Music Media stated that its use of "soft" is "very deceptive", noting a live performance by soft grunge band Fleshwater as being "heavier than the brick walls around us".

== Characteristics ==
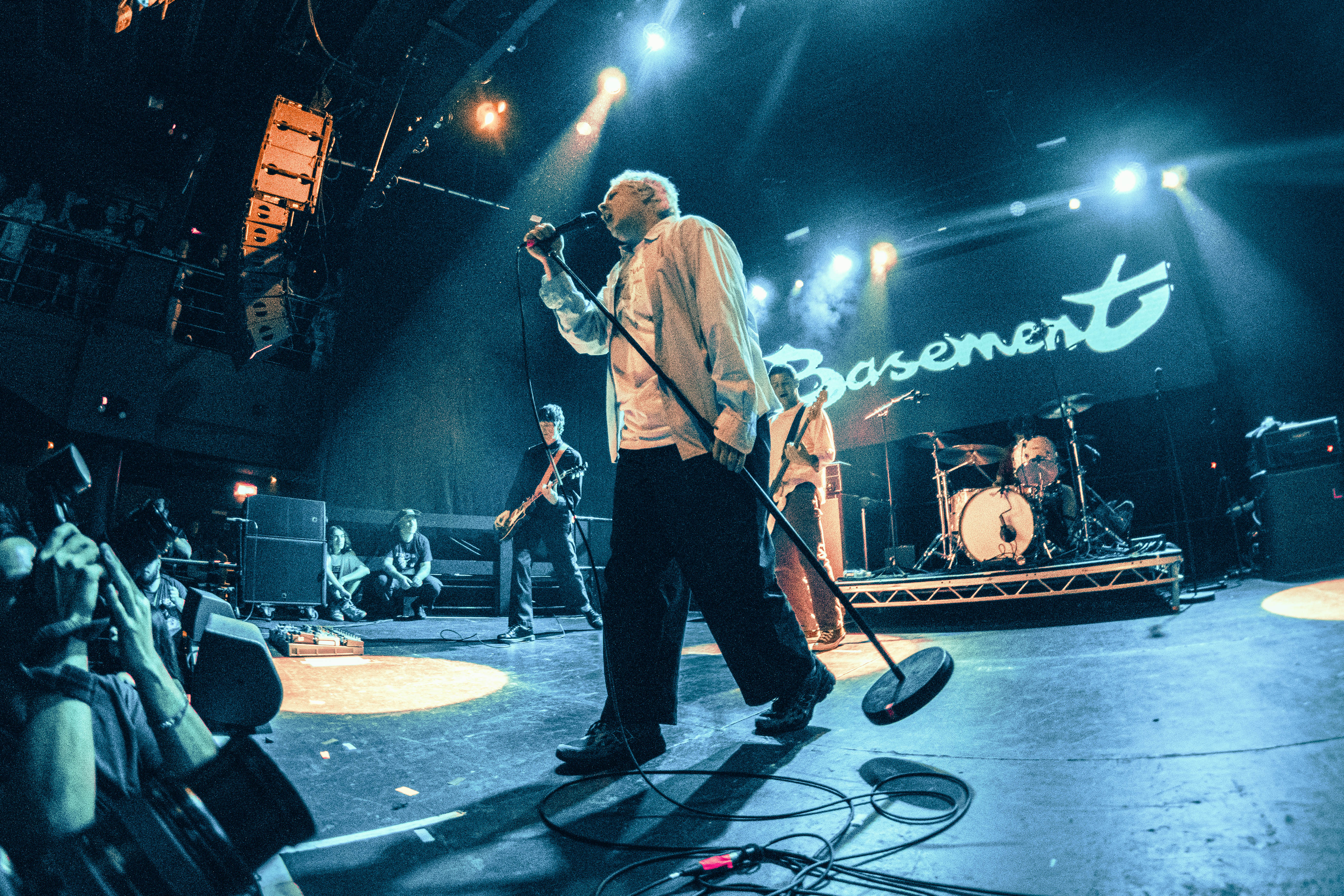
Basement were one of the earliest British bands to play soft grunge

Stuff You Will Hate said soft grunge merges elements of 1990s-style emo and grunge. Bandcamp Daily defined it as fusion of "emo-ish" music with "heavier rock elements". Chicago Reader called it Midwest emo with elements of "Puget Sound rock". PopMatters writer Ethan Stewart described the genre as building upon the template set by emo bands from Seattle, specifically Seaweed and Sunny Day Real Estate, making use of their guitar riffing style where melodies are played using droning bends, as well as half-time drumming and Sunny Day Real Estate's style of vocal harmonies. He also stated that the genre's "grunge influence was less explicit than the label implied", noting Nirvana's soft-loud dynamic as integral, but also the influence of alternative metal groups Hum and Failure, and noise rock groups Dinosaur Jr. and Sonic Youth. Some critics noted the sound as similar to shoegaze, despite bands in the genre denying it as an influence. In a 2026 interview with PopMatters, Balance and Composure vocalist Jon Simmons credited this to how "somewhere along the line, people started thinking if a band uses reverb then it is shoegaze".

Lyrics in the genre are often emotional, accompanied by a "brooding" vocal style, mixed quietly and using slow, "droning" melodies. RVA Magazine writer Marilyn Drew Necci described core elements of the genre as its melodic but heavy guitar riffs, catchy choruses and "pretty vocals". Guitar tones are modified using effects units, particularly reverb and delay. Songs are often written in minor keys and have a meloncholic mood, discussing both positive and negatives experiences, into what Consume magazine called "everyday lyrical narratives". Uproxx writer Ian Cohen called the genre "the midpoint" between Stone Temple Pilots's song "Sex Type Thing" (1993) and Sunny Day Real Estate's song "In Circles" (1994). Acts in the genre sometimes embrace elements of pop-punk.

During the early 2010s, journalists often discussed soft grunge as a part of a broader "grunge revival" or "grunge throwback", alongside Violent Soho, Yuck and Nothing.

== History ==
=== Precursors ===
Grunge and emo have long been intertwined. Squirrel Bait were influential upon both genres. Grunge frontmen Eddie Vedder and Kurt Cobain noted early emo works as favourites or direct influences. Early 1990s Seattle bands, Seaweed and Sunny Day Real Estate, have both been noted by critics as merging elements of emo and grunge. In an extract written for Amy Fleisher Madden's book Negatives: A Photographic Archive of Emo (1996-2006), Matt Pryor vocalist of 1990s emo band the Get Up Kids noted much of the second-wave of emo, and especially his own band, as influenced by Nirvana. Punknews noted Mineral as merging post-grunge and emo.

=== 2007–2012: Origins ===
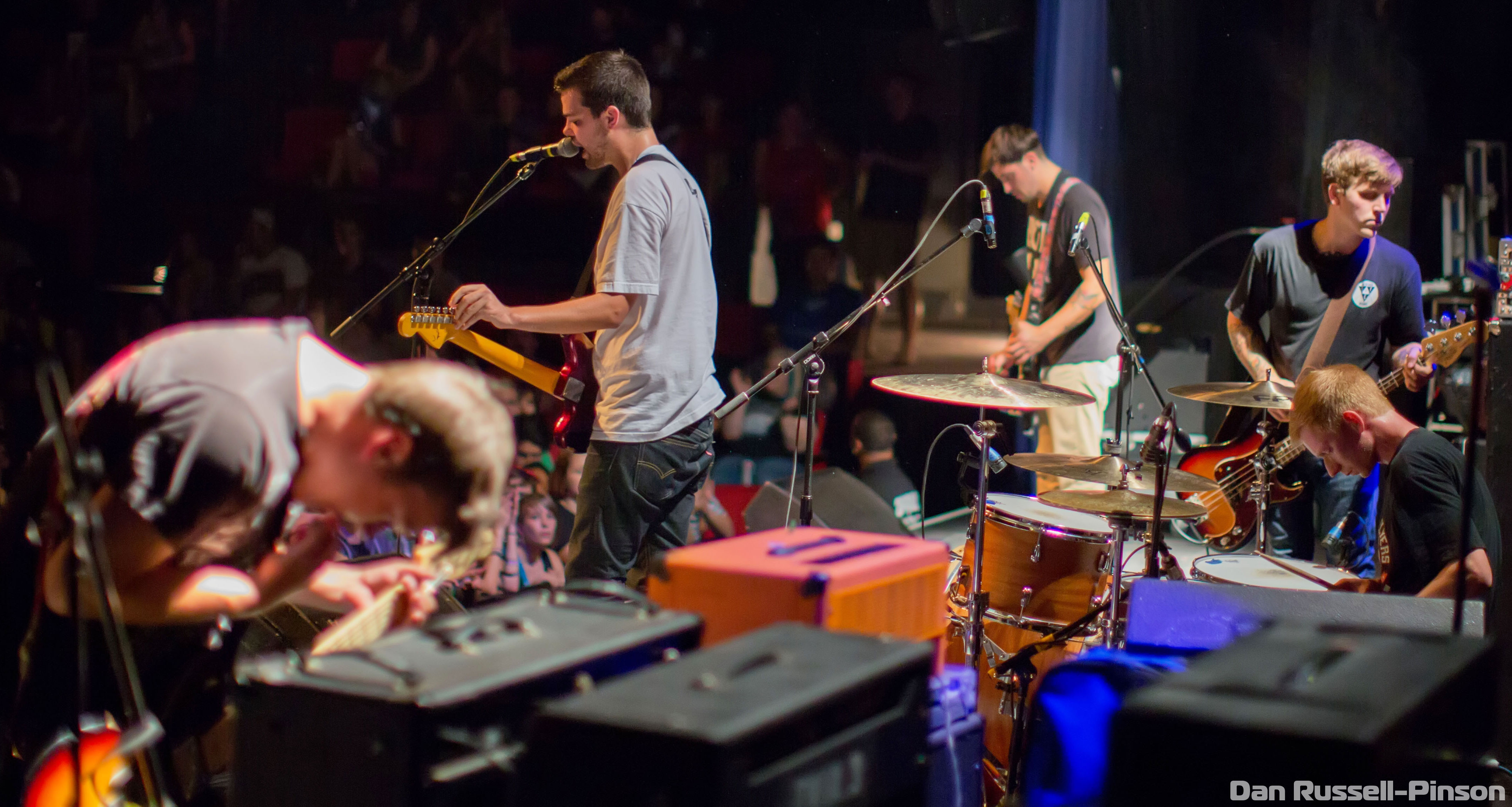
Balance and Composure, the earliest soft grunge band

Soft grunge began in the late 2000s and early 2010s, when bands involved in Pennsylvania's fourth-wave emo scene began to incorporate 1990s alternative rock influences. This included Balance and Composure, Superheaven and Title Fight. The earliest of these was Balance and Composure, who had been pursuing the sound since their 2007 formation. In a 2026 interview with PopMatters, the band's vocalist Jon Simmons said he devised the fusion while listening to Jimmy Eat World's song "Table for Glasses" (1999), which he believed recalled rock music more than conventional emo. Many of these Pennsylvania bands would file share, which led to other bands being introduced to Balance and Composure's influences. Superheaven and Title Fight pivoted to soft grunge on their 2012 releases Floral Green and The Difference in Good and Bad Dreams.

=== 2012–2014: First-wave ===
Following Floral Green's release, Title Fight became soft grunge's forefront act. The album was widely influential, inspiring many bands to pursue a similar sound. Many of these bands were signed to Run for Cover Records a label soon renowned for the grunge influence of its artists. Around this time, the first wave of bands in the genre emerged. In the United States this included Turnover, Citizen and Seahaven. The United Kingdom also developed a large soft grunge scene, fronted by Basement, Headroom and Hindsights. Often, albums were produced by Will Yip. Citizen's debut album Youth (2013) was particularly influential amongst 2010s young people, particularly on Tumblr. Its sound was more masculine than other bands, particularly through the use of more hardcore-inspired vocals. Some groups in this early era of the genre were made up of former easycore musicians, who shifted their sound into soft grunge. This included Citizen and In This for Fun who became Basement.

On Attack on Memory (2012), indie rock band Cloud Nothings shifted into the genre. Record Weekly credited Wavves as "gap-bridgers" between traditional grunge and soft grunge, particularly on their songs" Nine Is God" (2013) "Help Is on the Way" (2021). The Fader also noted their 2015 song "Heavy Metal Detox" as an example of the genre. At the same time, Narrow Head, Nevermind Me and Cloakroom merged elements of shoegaze with soft grunge, while Drug Church and Endless Heights merged it with melodic hardcore.

Swim into the Sound writer Taylor Grimes noted 2014 as "the peak of the soft grunge explosion".

=== 2015: Developments ===
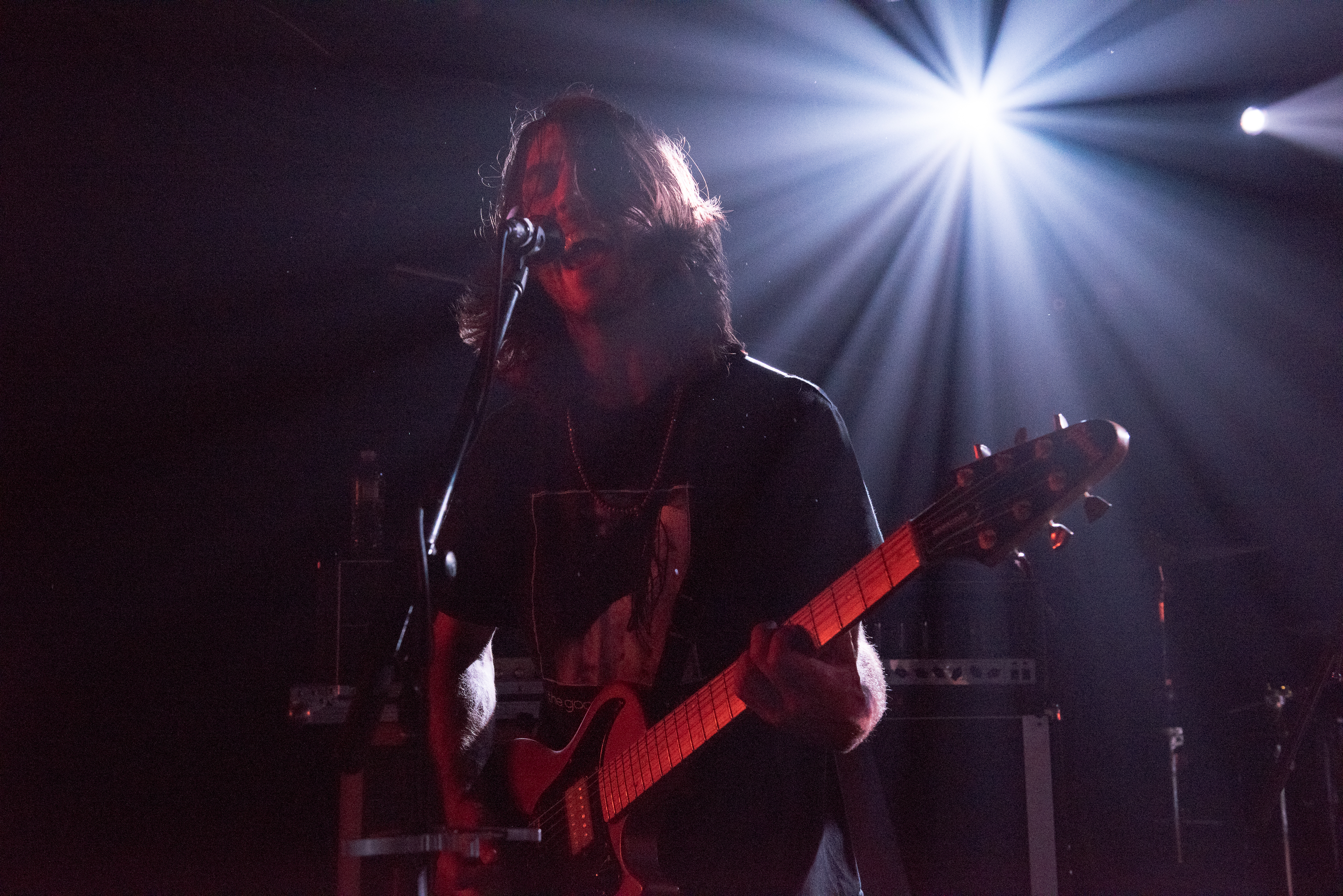
Turnover fused soft grunge and dream pop on Peripheral Vision, which was widely influential

Title Fight's third album Hyperview pushed their sound more atmosopheric, in a way that bordered on shoegaze. Turnover's second album Peripheral Vision merged the genre with elements of dream pop. Its guitar tones maligned distortion and created a calmer mood than was normal for the genre. The album reached number 14 on the Billboard independent albums chart and was widely influential. Movements vocalist Patrick Miranda stated in a 2025 interview that "Every band wanted to sound like Title Fight Floral Green. Every local band... until Turnover put out Peripheral Vision and then it was like the whole scene flipped". In 2015, Ox-Fanzine writer, Tim Masson noted Superheaven's second album Ours Is Chrome as "one of the most important alternative rock—or, if you prefer, emo-grunge-rock—albums of recent times", noting that they "progressed... to the point where they themselves can be considered a benchmark for others".

That year, many North American Defend Pop Punk Era acts shifted their sound in favor of soft grunge, becoming one of the most prominent sounds in the pop punk scene during the mid-2010s. One such band was Major League, who pivoted to soft grunge on their second album There’s Nothing Wrong With Me (2014). Diamond Youth incorporated elements of it on their debut album Nothing Matters (2015), as did Kagoule. Stereogum writer Ian Cohen described "the sound of popular punk" in the mid-2010s as being a "Warped Tour traditionalism, soft-grunge, emo revival, and indie-leaning pop-punk", particularly citing pop-punk band the Wonder Years's tour in support of their album The Greatest Generation as being "a time capsule" of the time, due to its openers being the soft grunge band Citizen, emo revival band Modern Baseball and pop-punk band Real Friends.

=== 2016–2019: Decline and second-wave ===
In 2016, the first wave of soft grunge declined, with the disbandments of Superheaven and Hindsights and the slowing activity of Title Fight. That year, some prominent pioneers of the genre began to shift their sound closer to pop rock, particularly Balance and Composure on Light We Made and Basement on Promise Everything, with Citizen also taking a more commercial sound on As You Please (2017). In a 2017 article for The Alternative, writer Eli Enis said that still playing soft grunge seemed "like a stale idea".

A second-wave of the genre began to take shape that year, with American groups Microwave, Movements and Fiddlehead, and the French band Paerish. Amongst this wave, its fusion with shoegaze became increasingly common, especially following the release of Narrow Head's debut album Satisfaction. Other acts in the genre from this time included Culture Abuse, Muskets, Milk Teeth, Stay Inside, Wallflower, Bloody Knees and Teenage Wrist.

Soft grunge grew a sizeable scene in Indonesia, including Bitter Colour, Barefood, Collapse and Fernie Sue. Celebrithink writer Ahmad Sabar Santoso describe soft grunge as being "typical" sound for a bands based in Yogyakarta. A 2019 article by the Alternative said "Indonesia is doing [soft grunge] better than any country on earth", citing Backyard and Enamore as examples. By 2023, the Indonesian soft grunge scene was increasingly leaning into indie rock.

=== 2020–present: Third-wave ===
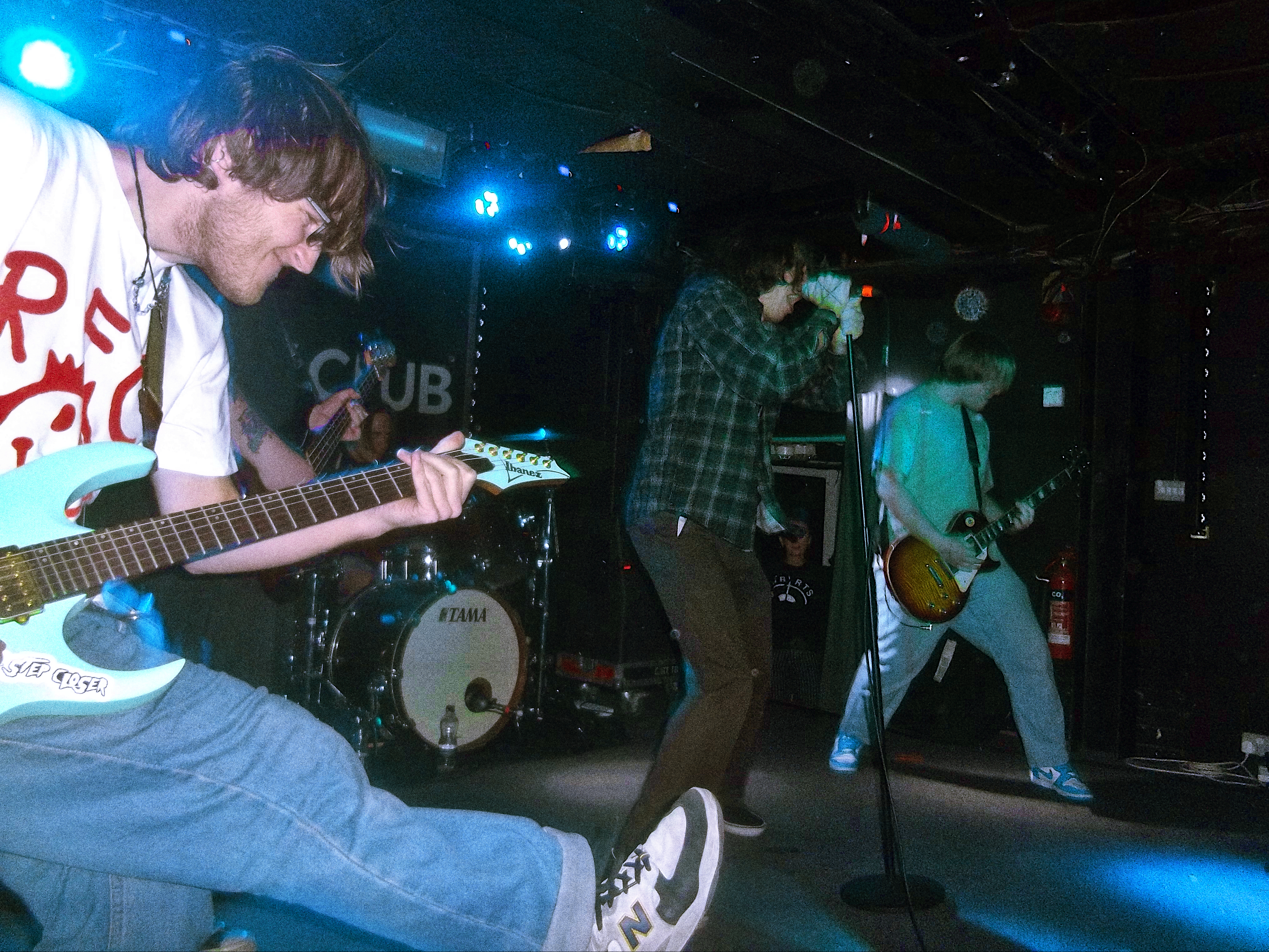
One Step Closer shifted their sound to soft grunge on their second album All You Embrace (2024)

During the 2020s, soft grunge was repopularized by artist signed to New Morality Zine, including, Downward, Trauma Ray, cursetheknife and ASkySoBlack, as well as other bands Modern Color, Soul Blind and Gleemer. This wave was particularly prominent in Texas, where Narrow Head were forefront. Many bands in the state were signed to Sunday Drive Records, such as Glare and Leaving Time. One Step Closer, who were previously a forefront band in 2020s melodic hardcore, shifted their sound to soft grunge on their second album All You Embrace (2024).

Soft grunge bands Basement and Superheaven experienced a surge in popularity in the 2020s through viral songs on TikTok. During the emo revival, Superheaven had not been one of the more commercially successful in the genre, however following their TikTok success, their song "Youngest Daughter" (2013) reached number three on the Billboard Hot Hard Rock Songs chart. During this time Superheaven, Balance and Composure and Basement reformed.

== Grungegaze ==
Grungegaze (or dreamo) is a subgenre of soft grunge that combines elements of grunge and shoegaze. The genre makes use of simple, heavy guitar riffs, thick guitar tones, hazey production and dynamics where verses are soft and choruses are loud. Clash writer Tom Morgan compared the genre's lyrics to "teenage bedroom poetry", noting them as "vague" and "undercooked". Typically, vocals are subdued in verses.

Soft grunge bands often performed alongside, signed to the same labels and had elements in common with the hardcore scene's 2010s shoegaze revival, which included Pity Sex, Whirr and Nothing. Because of this, many critics and fans conflated soft grunge artists into shoegaze, despite its early practitioners not being influenced by the genre. In 2013, music began to be released that featured soft grunge music but incorporated the influence of shoegaze. These included Narrow Head's Demonstration MMXIII (May 27, 2013), Cloakroom's Infinity (June 16, 2013) and Nevermind Me's Nevermind Me (September 9, 2013). The following year, Leatherneck and Simmer established a grungegaze in Cheshire, England. On their second album Ours Is Chrome, Superheaven transitioned into the genre. BrooklynVegan editor Andrew Sacher called them "grungegaze trailblazers".

During the late 2010s, Teenage Wrist, Modern Color, Oversize, Endless Heights and Soul Blind began to make grungaze. In the early 2020s, Spotify began recommending music that was similar to shoegaze to many users, this coincided with the release of Fleshwater's debut demo demo2020, who reaped its benefits. Fleshwater and Narrow Head were forefront in the popularization of grungegaze which began around 2023. In 2025, Clash listed "the contemporary grungegaze canon" as Narrow Head, Glare, Modern Color, Soul Blind, Trauma Ray and Leaving Time.

== Legacy ==
Soft grunge bands including Title Fight, Citizen, Balance and Composure and Basement were influential on the 2010s shoegaze revival and into the 2020s. In a 2025 retrospective article, former Revolver editor Eli Enis stated of Title Fight's third album: "Hyperview was dubbed a shoegaze record mostly by people who didn't know what shoegaze was beyond Nothing, Whirr, Pity Sex, and Deafheaven... but had such a marked influence on a genre it doesn't even belong to". The album, as well as the similarly timed success of Deafheaven and Nothing, caused shoegaze to become a trend in the hardcore scene.

Soft grunge gave way to nu-gaze, a genre that merges shoegaze and nu metal. It began around 2021, when grungegaze band Bleed released their debut EP Somebody's Closer. The members' other band Narrow Head too began to incorporate these elements on their third album Moments of Clarity. On their 2025 albums, Fleshwater and Oversize similarly pivoted. Kerrang! writer Jake Richardson credited Split Chain as "pioneers of a raucous brand of nu-gaze".

Soft grunge influenced some artists in the zoomergaze genre, such as Wisp and Quannnic, whose take on the genre was an outgrowth grungegaze.

During the 2020s, One Step closer, Anxious and Koyo developed a new Run for Cover sound, based more in hardcore.

== See also ==
- Alternative metal
- Grunge revival
