= Modern Color =

American rock band

- Origin: Redondo Beach, California, U.S.
- Genres: Post-hardcore; grungegaze; soft grunge; metalcore (early)
- Years active: 2014–present
- Labels: Open Door, Other People
- Spinoffs: Militarie Gun
- Members: Fleming Valenzuela; Chad Leaf; Chris Martinez; Vince Nguyen
- Website: moderncolorband.com

Modern Color is an American rock band formed Redondo Beach, California in 2014. Beginning as a metalcore band, they released their debut self-titled EP in 2014. Following a hiatus and major lineup changed, the band became more experimental under the influence of later emo revival bands. In 2016, they released their second EP Somewhere Else and their debut album Chromesthesia. Around 2017, they shifted their sound to grungegaze, a genre they would soon become one of the defining bands for. Following the release of their third album From The Leaves Of Your Garden (2020), they began to gain international success, which followed to their fourth album There Goes The Dream (2024).

== History ==
Modern Color formed in Redondo Beach, California, in 2014 from the ashes of multiple hardcore punk bands from the South Bay. In the years before Modern Color's formation, there was a trend for bands to using the format "[adjective] [color]". When considering a band name for a previous group featuring some future of Modern Color, the members parodied this, listing off different names that followed the format. One name listed, listed by Leaf, was "Modern Color", which they noted as liking. Two years later, they used the name. It was founded by Fleming Valenzuela on guitar and Vince Nguyen on drums, along with a bassist, vocalist and additional guitarist. This lineup played metalcore and recorded their 2014 self-titled EP. Following its release, the band took a break, soon reforming with a new lineup, including Valenzuela and Nguyen alongside Chad Leaf (guitar), Chris Martinez (bass) and Vince Nguyen (drums). By this time, the members had discovered Title Fight, leading them to shift their sound more experimental. The band searched for a singer, but were unable to find one, leading Valenzuela and Nguyen to take up vocal duties.

At the beginning of 2016, they released the EP Somewhere Else. On June 24, 2016, they released the single "Shade", announcing it would be a part of their debut album Chromesthesia. The album was released on July 29, 2016, through Open Door Records. On October 13, 2017, they released their second album Time Slips Behind Us. On September 28, 2018, they released the EP Portuguese Bend. Between November 6 and 10, 2019, they headlined a tour of Japan. On April 24, 2020, they released the single "Out of Reach". On July 10, 2020, they released their third album From The Leaves Of Your Garden. In 2021, they released the EP Now, Life Is Living You.

On October 11, 2022, they released the single "Greener Grass". On October 11, 2023, they released the single "Fortress". Between April 27 and May 23, 2024, they toured the United States supporting Fleshwater, alongside 9million. On April 17, 2024, they released the single "Star 9200", announcing that both singles would be included on their fourth album There Goes the Dream, and that it would be released on July 26. Between May 5 and 23, they toured Europe supporting Scowl. Between October 17 and November 23, 2025, they opened for Thrice on their North American headline tour.

== Musical style ==
Critics have categorized Modern Color's music as grungegaze, soft grunge and post-hardcore. In a 2021 interview with Shoutout LA, they identified as an alternative rock band, while in a 2024 interview, Nguyen stated "Most people would consider us an emo band through and through". The Alternative writer Olivia Keasling called them "a reminder that genre isn't fucking real". They incorporate elements of screamo, indie rock, shoegaze and college rock. Stereogum writer Tom Breihan described them as "a bit like '90s Midwest shoegaze without fully locking into that sound". On Time Slips Behind Us (2017), they pivoted their sound to grungegaze, then on From the Leaves of Your Garden (2020), they moved closer to dream pop.

Their music makes use of both clean singing and screaming, irregular rhythms, and atmospheric guitars. Often their songs are mid-tempo, based around dynamics, and make use of rhythm sections reminiscent of hardcore alongside more indie rock-inspired guitars. Some songs make use of breakbeats, subdued vocals and ethereal synths.

Modern Color have cited influences including Title Fight, Hum, Dinosaur Jr., Turnover, Deafheaven, True Widow, Joyce Manor, Duster, Touché Amoré, Deftones, Tears for Fears and the Pixies. In an interview with Alternative Press, they cited the increased experimentation of the later stages of the emo revival as helping them feel free to experiment with their own sound.

Modern Color helped to define the grungegaze genre. During the 2020s, they made up what Clash magazine writer Tom Morgan called "the contemporary grungegaze canon", alongside Narrow Head, Glare, Soul Blind, Trauma Ray and Leaving Time.

They have been cited as an influence by Static Dress and Split Chain.

== Members ==
- Fleming Valenzuela – vocals, guitar
- Chad Leaf – guitar
- Chris Martinez – bass
- Vince Nguyen – vocals, drums

== Discography ==
Studio albums

- Chromesthesia (2016)
- Time Slips Behind Us (2017)
- From The Leaves Of Your Garden (2020)
- There Goes The Dream (2024)

EPs

- Modern Color (2014)
- Somewhere Else (2016)
- Portuguese Bend (2018)
- Now, Life Is Living You (2021)
