= We're Not Here to Be Loved =

Studio album by Fleshwater
- Released: November 4, 2022
- Recorded: July 2021
- Studio: GodCity, Salem, Massachusetts
- Genre: Grungegaze; alternative metal; post-hardcore
- Length: 27:31
- Label: Closed Casket Activities
- Producer: Kurt Ballou

Fleshwater chronology
demo2020 (2020)	We're Not Here to Be Loved (2022)	Sounds of Grieving (2023)

Singles from We're Not Here to Be Loved
- 1. "Kiss the Ladder" Released: October 6, 2022; 2. "The Razor's Apple" Released: October 21, 2022

Professional ratings
Review scores
Source	Rating
Boolin Tunes	9.5/10
Brooklyn Vegan	Positive
Pitchfork	7.5
Sputnikmusic	4.5/5

We're Not Here to Be Loved is the debut studio album by American rock band Fleshwater. Produced by Converge guitarist Kurt Ballou, the album was released on November 4, 2022, through Closed Casket Activities.

== Background ==
Fleshwater was formed in 2017 by Anthony DiDio, Matt Wood, and Jeremy Martin of Vein.fm along with Marisa Shirar. The band released a demo on February 21, 2020; the demo was re-released later that year on cassette with a cover of "Enjoy" by Björk as a bonus track. The demo became an underground hit on the Internet, with the song "Linda Claire" gaining over 1 million streams on Spotify.

On October 6, 2022, the band released the single "Kiss the Ladder" and announced that their debut studio album would be released on November 4. The band released a second single, "The Razor's Apple," on October 21.

== Track listing ==
All tracks are written by Fleshwater, except where noted.

No.	Title	Writer(s)	Length
1.	"Baldpate Driver"		4:13
2.	"Closet"		2:02
3.	"The Razor's Apple"		3:11
4.	"Woohoo"		3:44
5.	"Linda Claire"		2:37
6.	"Kiss the Ladder"		1:17
7.	"Enjoy"	Björk; Adrian Thaws	3:23
8.	"Backstairs Breathing"		1:56
9.	"Foreign"		5:05
Total length:			27:31

Cassette edition bonus track
No.	Title	Length
10.	"Woohoo" (What If Mix)	3:07
Total length:		30:38

== Personnel ==
Fleshwater

- Marisa Shirar – lead vocals, guitar
- Anthony DiDio – guitar, vocals
- Jeremy Martin – bass
- Matt Wood – drums

Additional

- Kurt Ballou – producer, mixing
- Nick Townsend – mastering
- Fleshwater – artwork, layout
