= LimeWire (album) =

Studio album by Dying in Designer
- Released: October 10, 2025
- Length: 26:37
- Label: Dying Inn Records (self-released)

Dying in Designer chronology
| Nobody's Happy. 2 (2024) | LimeWire (2025) |

Singles from LimeWire
- 1. "Evil Eyes" Released: June 6, 2025; 2. "LimeWire" Released: July 9, 2025; 3. "Endgame" Released: August 1, 2025; 4. "Desiree" Released: August 28, 2025; 5. "Everyone Against Everyone" Released: September 25, 2025

LimeWire is the third studio album by the American musical project Dying in Designer. It was self-released through frontman Robert O'Brien's own label, Dying Inn Records, on October 10, 2025, as the follow-up to his 2024 album Nobody's Happy. 2. It is Dying in Designer's first album as a full band, having previously been O'Brien's solo project. It was preceded by the singles "Evil Eyes", "LimeWire", "Endgame", "Desiree", and "Everyone Against Everyone".

== Background ==
"Evil Eyes", the first single from LimeWire, was released on June 6, 2025. A metalcore and nu gaze song influenced by bands such as Slipknot and Linkin Park, it marks a departure from Dying in Designer's initial emo rap and pop-punk influenced sound. O'Brien described the song as being about "people not wanting you to do well", and how "sometimes the people closest to you don't actually want the best for you". The title track from LimeWire was released as its second single on July 9. The song has been described as pairing "crushing guitars with a melodic core", and was stated by O'Brien to be about "how connection today feels disposable, like downloading something just to delete it later". The track's release coincided with the launch of an animated series based on the album's narrative, released exclusively on Instagram. Shortly after the track's release, a Spotify release countdown for the album appeared, revealing its release date to be October 10. On July 25, O'Brien announced the album's third single, "Endgame", to be released a week later on August 1. The album's fourth single, "Desiree", was released on August 28. Its fifth single, "Everyone Against Everyone", was released on September 25.

== Track listing ==
LimeWire track listing
| No. | Title | Writer(s) | Producer(s) | Length |
|---|---|---|---|---|
| 1. | "LimeWire" | Jameson Dague; Juan García; Seth Henderson; Robert O'Brien | Henderson; O'Brien | 2:19 |
| 2. | "Endgame" | Dague; Henderson; O'Brien | Henderson; O'Brien | 2:24 |
| 3. | "Everyone Against Everyone" | O'Brien; Maggie O'Shea | Alessandro Adinolfi; Fadio Adinolfi; Henderson; O'Brien | 2:43 |
| 4. | "Hang Me" | O'Brien | Bad Kid; Henderson; O'Brien | 3:02 |
| 5. | "Desiree" | O'Brien | Bad Kid; Henderson; O'Brien | 2:51 |
| 6. | "Tough Guys Don't Cry" | O'Brien | A. Adinolfi; F. Adinolfi; Henderson; O'Brien | 2:52 |
| 7. | "The End." | O'Brien | A. Adinolfi; F. Adinolfi; Henderson; O'Brien | 3:01 |
| 8. | "Bullet With Your Name on It" | García; O'Brien | Bad Kid; Henderson; O'Brien | 2:37 |
| 9. | "Mirror, Mirror" | Dague; García; O'Brien | Henderson; O'Brien | 2:02 |
| 10. | "Evil Eyes" | García; O'Brien; Eoin O'Dwyer | Layen; O'Brien | 2:46 |
| Total length: | | | | 26:37 |

=== Notes ===
- "Mirror, Mirror" is stylized in sentence case.
