= Zoomergaze =

Generation Z revival of shoegaze

- Etymology: Zoomer + shoegaze
- Stylistic origins: Shoegaze; nu-gaze; digicore; hyperpop; electronic
- Cultural origins: 2020s, United States

Other topics
- Laptop twee; DAW; nu metal; emo rap; 2010s shoegaze revival; hyper-rock; grungegaze; soft grunge; SoundCloud indie

Zoomergaze is a loosely defined style of electronic music and nu-gaze characterized by Generation Z musicians experimenting with the boundaries of shoegaze. The genre is a merger of shoegaze with internet music styles such as digicore and hyperpop. It sometimes incorporates influences from alternative metal and grunge-inspired genres such as grungegaze and soft grunge.

During the late 2010s and early 2020s, hyperpop artists such as Strawberry Hospital, Fax Gang and Parannoul began to embrace shoegaze. Jane Remover and Quannnic's albums Frailty (2021) and Kenopsia (2022) popularized the style, initiating a wave that included Aldn, d0llywood1, Jaydes and Twikipedia. By 2023, its popularity spread on TikTok, where Wisp became the style's forefront act.

== Etymology ==
"Zoomergaze" is a portmanteau of "shoegaze" and "zoomer" (meaning Generation Z). In a 2024 article for WhyNow, writer Harvey Solomon-Brady used the term to refer to the fusion of hyperpop and shoegaze. In a 2026 article Vice magazine used a broader definition: shoegaze made by generation Z.

In a 2024 article for Nina Protocol, music blogger Eli Enis called the style "VSTi-gaze" and "compu-gaze". Writing for Pitchfork, Samuel Hyland attributed the term "cloud-rock", coined and popularized by Nina Protocol as a "progeny of shoegaze". Music journalist Nick DeMasi of No Bells cited the genre as stemming partially from zoomergaze. Music journalist Kieran Press-Reynolds defined a "Post-Pandemic Alt-Rock" scene which overlapped with cloud rock, citing groups who arose alongside Bar Italia, blending influences from the Cure, Dean Blunt, Blur, Pavement, trip hop and shoegaze.

== Characteristics ==
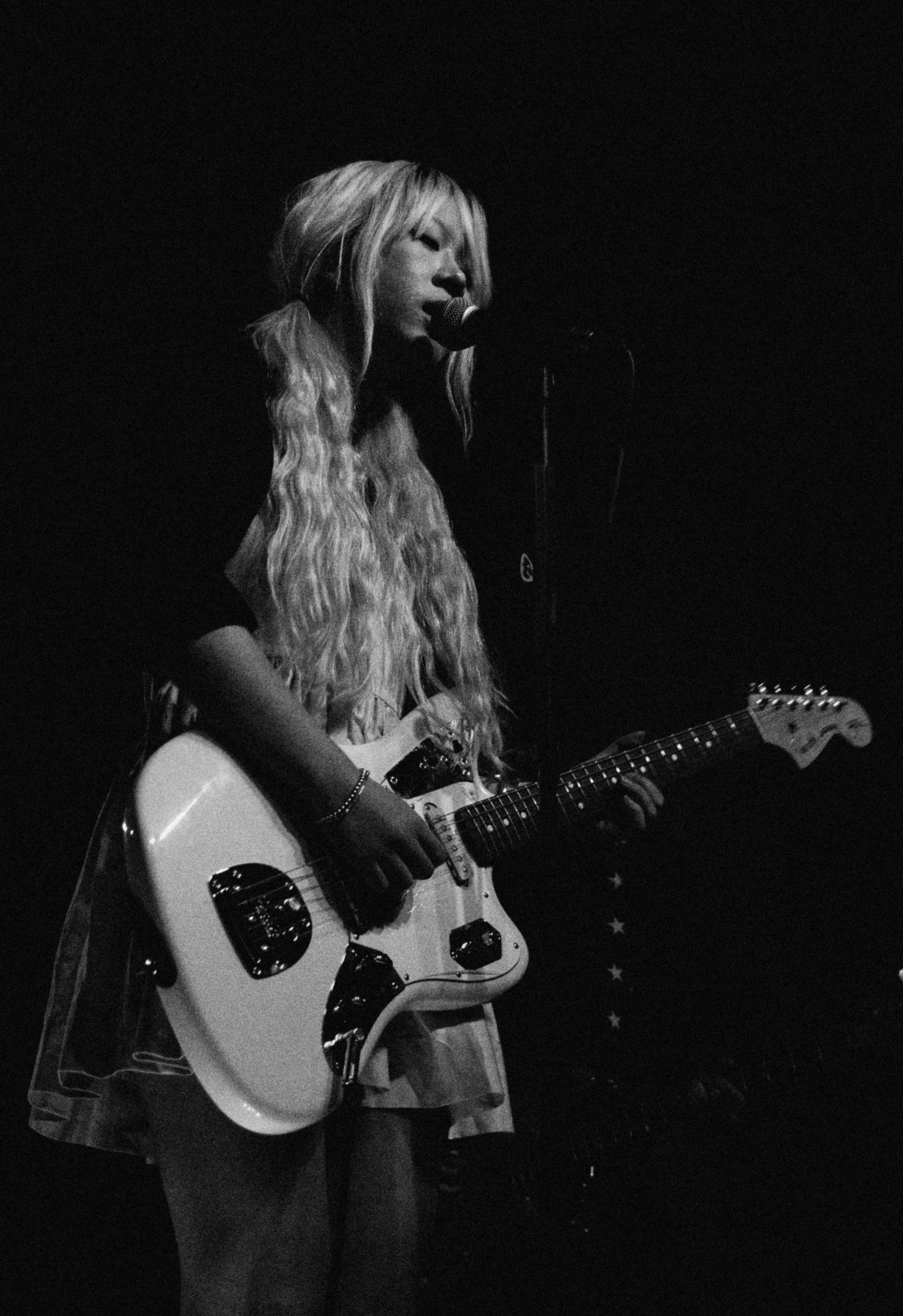
Wisp, the most commercially successful zoomergaze artist

These musicians incorporated elements of digicore with shoegaze's atmospheric textures and grunge's energy. In particular, merging shoegaze instrumental elements alongside electronic elements including vocals that are effected by pitch shifting, autotune and formant editing, as well as glitches and entirely electronic segments. Some arts put an emphasis on elements of electronic dance music such as drops, while others shunned physical guitars entirely, dealing only in MIDI and sampled instruments. Enis noted that "it’s not a genre", instead calling it a "trend" and "generational spirit", in which artists are "drifting in and out of shoegaze... retaining the sonic elasticity of the genre they came from".

Art in Sight stated most zoomergaze artists play indie rock, in a manner influenced by shoegaze. Claudio Lancia of the Italian magazine Ondarock, called zoomergaze a subgenre of nu-gaze. PopMatters writer Ethan Stewart called it a subgenre of electronic music and noted the influence of grungegaze and soft grunge upon artists including Wisp and Quannnic.

Common influences upon artists in the style were traditional shoegaze artists Whirr, Slowdive and My Bloody Valentine; as well as newer, experimental takes on the genre such as the vocaloid shoegaze album Mikgazer vol. 1 (2012); and Parannoul's album To See the Next Part of the Dream (2021), which used MIDI instrumentation. Artists outside of shoegaze that were influential upon its sound were dream pop band Beach House; soft grunge bands Basement and Superheaven; and alternative metal bands Deftones and Hum. Solomon-Brady credited the sound as the culmination of the 2010s shoegaze revival and the concurrent bleak indie-indebted music of MGMT, Lana Del Rey and Tame Impala, within the context of generation Z digital natives tendency towards doomscrolling. Eli Enis cited Asian Glow as influencing the "DAW-designed digi-gaze" of Jane Remover, Twikipedia and Quannnic.

== History ==
=== 2010s: Precursors ===
During the 2010s and early 2020s, there was an increased number of experimental takes on shoegaze, which would go on to inspire the sound of zoomergaze. In the Philadelphia, Philly shit, shoegaze scene of the late 2010s, They Are Gutting a Body of Water and Full Body 2 were incorporating electronic elements such as glitched breakbeats and synthesisers. Stereogum writer James Rettig coined the term "hyper-rock" in reference to nearby band Feeble Little Horse, citing their incorporation of a hyperpop's "genre-omnivorous" songwriting style into heavy shoegaze. Amongst zoomergaze musicians, Solomon-Brady noted the influence of vocaloid shoegaze album Mikgazer vol. 1 (2012); and Parannoul's album To See the Next Part of the Dream (2021), which used MIDI instrumentation.

=== 2020s: Origins ===
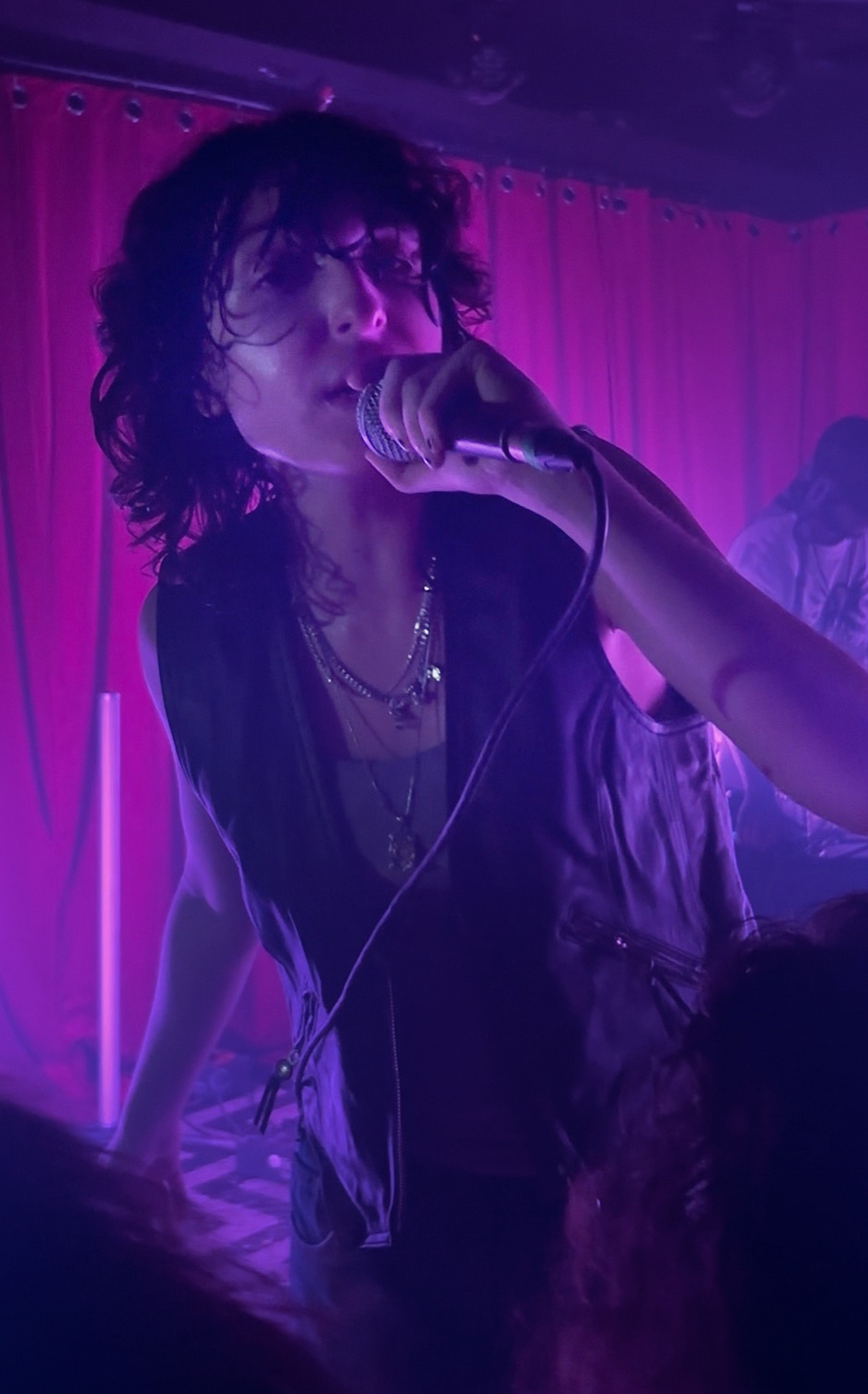
Jane Remover, photographed in April 2025, blended digicore with shoegaze on the album Frailty.

In the early 2020s, a wave of practitioners of the electronic genres hyperpop and digicore began to experiment with rock elements. One major strain of this was artists who incorporated elements of shoegaze. As early as 2018, Strawberry Hospital's album Grave Chimera was merging elements of shoegaze into hyperpop.

In 2021, Alternative Press writer, Giedre Matulaityte credited the album, as "reimagining everything you know about shoegaze". Matulaityte also noted Fax Gang's Aethernet (2021) as merging elements of shoegaze with hyperpop and hexD. Jane Remover experimented with a similar fusion on Frailty (2021), with Quannnic following with Kenopsia (2022). Both leaned further into their shoegaze influence on their subsequent albums Census Designated (2023) and Stepdream (2023). That year, the movement expanded outside of the digicore and hyperpop realm, as emo rapper Deep October, an influence upon digicore, released The World Doesn't Deserve You (2023).

In a 2023 interview, Quannnic stated the phenomenon of digicore artists embracing shoegaze was due to digicore feeling "creatively stifled", while in a 2024 interview, hyperpop musician and manager, Zazie Bae said it was due to the digicore and hyperpop artist not being "taken seriously".

By the end of 2023, zoomergaze artists Flyingfish and Wisp had garnered viral followings on TikTok. That same year, Pitchfork described the year as when "The Shoegaze Revival Hit Its Stride," with the TikTok hashtag #slowdive reaching 235 million views as well as the hashtag #shoegaze reaching 730 million views. By 2024, writer Ryan Pinkard stated, "TikTok has done for Gen Z what MySpace did for millennials in the early 2000s". Stereogum credited the platform with making shoegaze "bigger than ever," while publications such as Vice noted that many teenagers were using shoegaze to soundtrack their "bleak, post-COVID world." In 2024, in a review of Beabadoobee's third studio album This Is How Tomorrow Moves published in The Guardian, British music critic Kitty Empire stated "Post, for one, takes a Taylor Swift–ish pop song and runs it through a 'zoomergaze' filter – zoomergaze being the latest iteration of My Bloody Valentine's influence as refracted by the internet." In 2025, Dork noted that Wisp was labelled as "the face of 'zoomergaze'" and described her as a leading artist in Gen Z's shoegaze revival.

During 2026, many zoomergaze artists stopped playing the genre, instead moving towards emo. These included Flyingfish, Sweet Boy and Dead Calm. Similarly, zoomergaze pioneers Quannnic and Photographic Memory started the emo band Car Underwater.

== See also ==
- Grungegaze
- Maidcore

== Bibliography ==
- Pinkard, Ryan (2024-10-03). Shoegaze. Genre: A 33 1/3. Bloomsbury Publishing USA. ISBN 979-8-7651-0343-2.
