= Muskets (band) =

English rock band

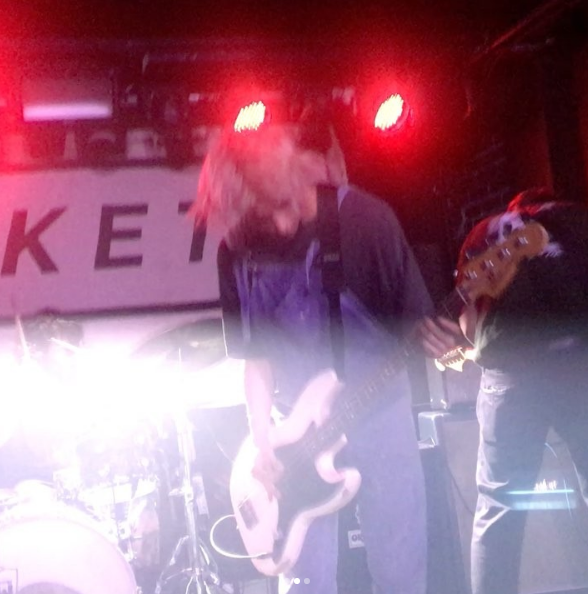
- Muskets performing in Leeds in 2017; from left to right: Joe Phillips, Dan Smith, Alex Cheung.

Background information
- Origin: Brighton, East Sussex, England
- Genres: Soft grunge; emo; grunge; alternative rock
- Years active: 2014–2019
- Labels: No Sleep, Venn, Don't Shoot the Messenger, Wake Collective
- Spinoffs: Uzumaki, Dynamite, Turn of Phrase, Out of Love
- Past members: Alex Cheung; Joe Phillips; Daniel McKenna; Dan Smith; Harry Steel; Corey Eyres

Muskets were an English rock band formed in Brighton, East Sussex, England in 2014, by Alex Cheung, Daniel Mckenna, Dan Smith and Joe Philips. They released two albums Chew (2017) and Violent Paradise (2019), as well as the two EPs Pollyseed (2014) and SPIN (2015)

== History ==
Daniel McKenna (guitar and vocals) and Alex Cheung (guitar and vocals) met while studying at university in Hastings, when McKenna drove to Brighton and gave Hastings a lift. On the journey, they decided to form a band. Muskets were formed in Brighton in 2014, experiencing various members changes early on, they soon solidified a steady lineup with the addition of Brighton BIMM University students Dan Smith on bass and Joe Phillips on drums. On 4 March, they released their debut EP Polyseed through Don't Shoot the Messenger Records and the Wake Collective. They quickly helped to establish a sector of the Brighton punk scene typified by the fusion of the grunge and emo, alongside Water Canvas, Broadbay and the New Tusk. The music video for "25A", from Polyseed was released on 25 April.

Between 5 and 12 August, they opened for Nevermind Me on their tour of the United Kingdom, alongside Water Canvas and Dissolve. On 11 August, they released the single "Colourview", announcing it would be a part of their upcoming EP Spin. Between 25 and 31 October, they co-headlined a tour of the United Kingdom alongside Beachtape. On 2 November 2015, they released the single "Scranton". Between 14 and 26 November 2015, they toured the UK with support from the New Tusk and Tigercub. On 1 December, they opened for Failure at the Boston Music Room in London. In February 2016, their van was robbed, losing mostly drum equipment and amplifiers. On 9 May 2016, they released the music video for the song "Drowsy". Between 28 September and 1 October, they co-headlined a tour of the United Kingdom with Rough Hands.

On 13 December 2016, they released the single "17 Years". On 25 April 2017, they announced they had signed to No Sleep Records. Between 11 and 15 June 2017, they toured the United Kingdom with support from Weatherstate. On 28 July 2017, they released the single "Chewing Gum". Between 20 and 24 August 2017, they opened for Culture Abuse and Tigers Jaw on their UK tour. On 13 September, they announced their debut album would be titled Chew and be released by No Sleep Records. On 2 October, they released the single "You're So Cool", premiered through Metal Hammer. On 20 October, they released their debut album Chew, premiered a day early by Upset magazine. Around the time of the release, they were described by Punktastic writer Ashwin Bhandari as one "of the biggest UK bands". Between 25 and 29 October, they co-headlined a tour of the United Kingdom with Wallflower.

McKenna departed from the band in 2017, with his role being filled by Smith, while bass duties were taken over by Harry Steel. Soon Smith departed from the band, being replaced by Corey Eyres. On 9 January 2018, they released the single "Umbilicle", premiered by Substream Magazine. Between 13 and 15 January 2019, they did a short tour with dates in Brighton and London. On 31 July, they released their second album Violent Paradise. Soon, Cheung started the band Uzumaki. Both Muskets and Uzumaki were offered tours, but Cheung did not have enough time off work to do both. He chose Uzumaki, and Muskets disbanded.

Following Muskets' disbandment, Phillips went on to form soft grunge band Out of Love. In 2023, Cheung formed the hardcore punk band Dynamite. They both formed the melodic hardcore band Turn of Phrase, which launched in 2025.

== Musical style ==
Critics have categorised Muskets' music as emo, grunge, alternative rock, emo grunge, hardcore punk and post-punk.

They cited influenced including Basement, Title Fight, the Pixies, the Breeders, Citizen, Sunny Day Real Estate and Nada Surf. The playlist posted by No Sleep Records for the influences on Chew included Title Fight, Basement, Dinosaur Pile-Up, Kagoule, Cloud Nothings, the Wytches, PUP, Frank Carter and the Rattlesnakes, Blur and Queens of the Stone Age.

Critics noted elements of Surfer Rosa-era Pixies, Bleach-era Nirvana and '90s post-hardcore acts such as Fugazi and At the Drive-In. Already Heard writer Rob Mair compared them to Balance and Composure, the Decemberists and British band Hindsights. Punktastic writer Ben Tipple noted them as building upon the soft grunge of bands including Title Fight, while "adding a distinctive Britishness", which he likened to Gnarwolves.

Their music made use nonchalant but aggressive vocals, fast, punk drums, twinkly guitar riffs, heavy riffs, grande choruses high tempos, and dual lead vocals.

== Members ==
- Alex Cheung – guitar, vocals (2014–2019)
- Dan Smith – guitar, vocals (2017–2019), bass (2014–2017)
- Harry Steel – bass (2017–2019)
- Joe Phillips – drums (2014–2019)
- Daniel Mckenna – guitar, vocals (2014–2017)
- Corey Eyres – bass (2017–2019)

== Discography ==
=== Albums ===
Title	Album details
Chew	Released: October 20, 2017; No Sleep Records
Violent Paradise	Released: July 26, 2019; No Sleep Records

=== EPs ===
Title	Album details
Pollyseed	Released: March 4, 2014; Self-released
Spin	Released: August 7, 2015; Venn Records
