= Paerish =

French alt-rock band

- Origin: Paris, France
- Genres: Alternative rock; soft grunge; emo
- Years active: 2015–present
- Label: SideOneDummy
- Members: Mathias Court; Frédéric Wah; Loic Fouquet; Martin Dupraz
- Past members: Julien Louvion
- Website: paerish.bandcamp.com

Paerish (stylised as PÆRISH), is a French alternative rock band based in Paris. The band is composed of Mathias Court (guitar/vocals), Frédéric Wah (guitar), Martin Dupraz (bass), Loïc Fouquet (drums). Formed in 2013, the band has released three studio albums: Semi Finalists in 2016, Fixed It All in 2021 and You're In Both Dreams (And You're Scared) in 2023.

== History ==
=== 2010–2014: Early years ===
The formation of Paerish dates back to 2010 when the band members met in school in Paris. Members Court, Dupraz (bass) and Louvion (drums) – would first meet and form as a trio five years ago in a Paris film school, where Court and Dupraz were studying film production and Louvion sound engineering. The band adopted the name Paerish, which was based on the character Alan Parrish in Jumanji.

=== 2015–2018: Semi Finalists ===
In 2015, the band began writing and recording music for their first full-length studio album. On 20 July 2015, Paerish released "Undone", the lead single off their debut album, Semi Finalists. The band's second single off the album, "Then People Forget" came out on 19 November 2015.

Semi Finalists was officially released on December 2, 2016, Paerish then toured Europe relentlessly between 2016 and 2018 with Silversun Pickups, Sum41, Movements and Moose blood.

=== 2019–2023: Fixed It All ===
In 2019, after being independent of a record label, Paerish signed a contract with SideOneDummy Records ahead of their second studio album, originally anticipating for a released in 2020. The band announced that producer Will Yip would produce their second album, Fixed It All and in August 2020, the self-titled single was released. In an interview with Brooklyn Vegan, Court shared how the album would be more shoegazing-inspired than previous works. Court explained that the album was " much darker, heavier than what we've made in the past both sonically and lyrically. It's about the depression I felt losing one of my best friends and questioning the decisions in my life." Although writing and recording for the album was complete in late 2019 and were aiming for an early 2020 released, the onset of the COVID-19 pandemic, delayed the process of release of the album in 2021.

Fixed It All was eventually released through SideOneDummy on 23 April 2021. They released two b-sides "Boy" and "Stick to Silence" in 2022. While working on new material, Julien Louvion decided to leave the band and drummer Loic Fouquet who had long been a friend officially joined Paerish in the end of 2022. The band then flew back to Philadelphia to record their third LP with Will Yip.

=== 2023–present: You're In Both Dreams (And You're Scared) ===
Released by SideOneDummy Records and produced by Will Yip, this 10 track album was released August 18, 2023. The title of the album is taken from a portion of dialogue between two characters in the 2001 movie Mulholland Drive.

In 2026, the band released their fourth studio album, RITA, featuring the singles "Wait For Dark", "Vapor Cloud", and "What You Want".

== Musical style and influences ==
Critics have categorised Paerish's music as soft grunge, emo and alternative rock.

Paerish have cited influences including Stone Temple Pilots, David Bowie, Sum 41, the Offspring, Jimmy Eat World, the Pixies, the Smashing Pumpkins, Nirvana, Manchester Orchestra, Weezer, Mogwai, Queen, System of a Down and Blink-182.

== Discography ==
=== Studio albums ===
- Semi Finalists (2016)
- Fixed It All (2021)
- You're In Both Dreams (And You're Scared) (2023)
- RITA (2026)

=== Singles ===
- "Undone" (2015)
- "Then People Forget" (2015)
- "Party's Over, Biff" (2016)
- "Fixed It All" (2020)
- "Archives" (2020)
- "Violet" (2020)
- "Journey of the Prairie King" (2021)
- "Boy" (2021)
- "Stick to Silence" (2022)
- "Houses of American Style" (2023)
- "Daydreaming" (2023)
- "The Luck You Had" (2023)
- "Still There" (2023)
- "Wait For Dark" (2026)
- "Vapor Cloud" (2026)
- "What You Want" (2026)
