= Cloakroom (band) =

American shoegaze band

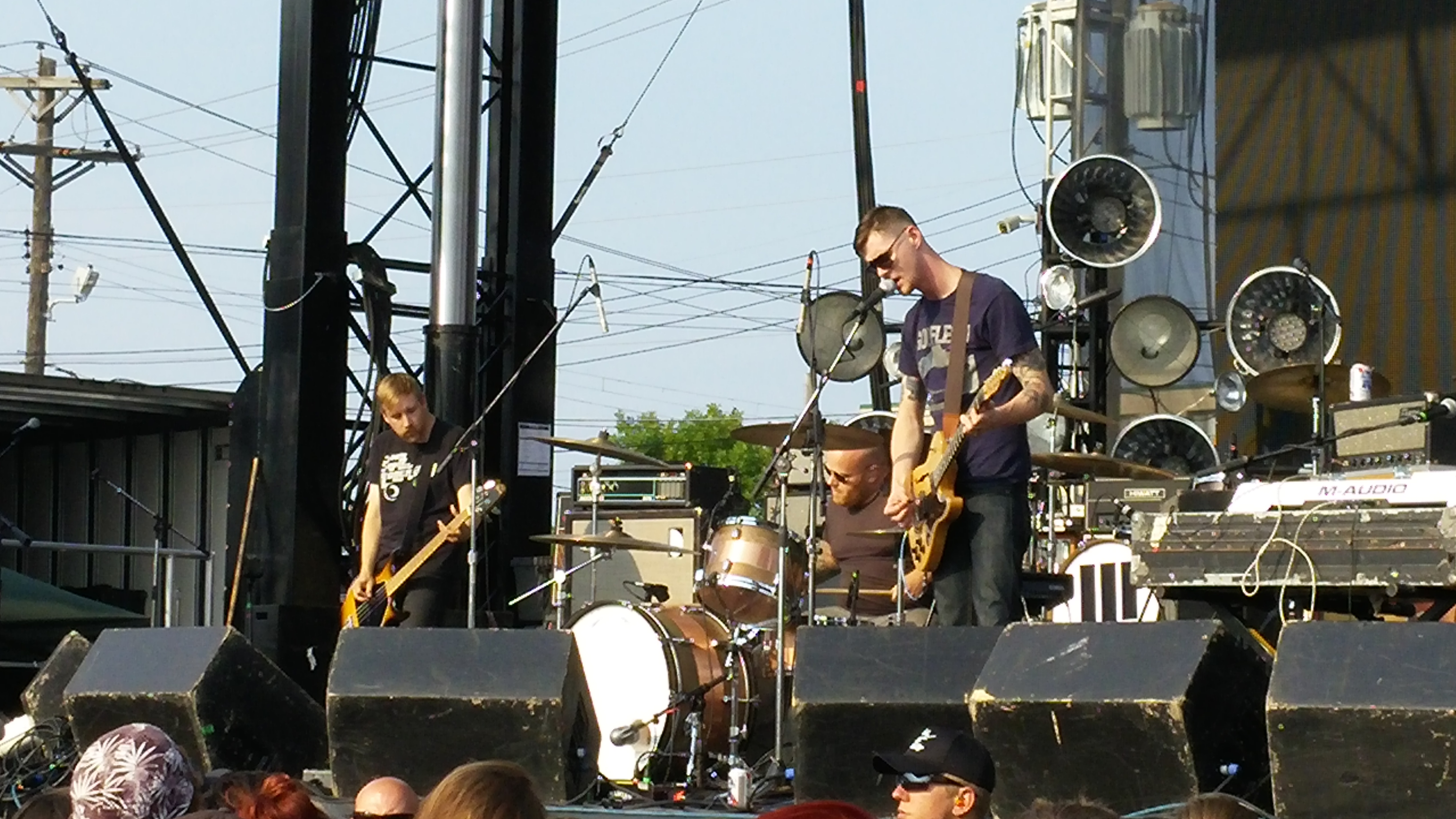
- Cloakroom at Cabooze in Minneapolis in June 2015

Background information
- Origin: Chesterton, Indiana, United States
- Genres: Shoegaze; grungegaze; post-hardcore; slowcore; emo; doomgaze
- Years active: 2012–present
- Labels: Closed Casket Activities; Relapse; Run for Cover
- Spinoff of: Grown Ups
- Members: Doyle Martin; Bobby Markos; Tim Remis; Cam Smith
- Past members: Brian Busch
- Website: cloakroom.bandcamp.com

Cloakroom is an American rock band from Chesterton, Indiana. Formed in 2012, by members of various emo revival bands, they released their debut EP Infinity through Run for Cover Records in 2013. The label soon released the band's debut album Further Out (2015), which helped to broaden the emo revival's sonic landscape, by incorporating elements of shoegaze, grunge and slowcore. Their following two albums Time Well (2017) and Dissolution Wave (2022), were released through Relapse Records, and saw the band shift their sound closer to metal. Their fourth album Last Leg of the Human Table (2025) was released by Closed Casket Activities.

== History ==
The band formed in summer 2012 in Chesterton, Indiana. Lead singer and guitarist Doyle Martin was previously in the bands Grown Ups and Lion of the North, and bassist Bobby Markos was in the band Native, and had met through performing on bills together. Their name was intended as a double meaning, both the, being both a room where clothes are stored and political corruption. The band signed to Run For Cover Records in 2013. The band released their first extended play, titled Infinity, in 2013 via Run For Cover. In 2014, the band released a single "Lossed Over," also on Run For Cover.

On January 20, 2015, the band released their debut album, Further Out, via Run For Cover Records. The album was produced by Matt Talbott of the band Hum. That year, they opened for Brand New after Jesse Lacey and his wife listened to Further Out. In the fall of 2016, they announced a tour of the UK and EU in support of Russian Circles. On June 20, 2017, the band announced that they would be releasing their second album, Time Well, via Relapse Records on August 18. On February 1, 2018, the band announced a two-week European tour with the band Caspian.

On November 30, 2021, the band announced that they would be releasing their third album, Dissolution Wave, via Relapse Records on January 28, 2022. Promotional materials for the album describe the album as "a space western in which an act of theoretical physics — the dissolution wave — wipes out all of humanity's existing art and abstract thought." A music video was released for the song "A Force at Play". The album features a guest appearance from Hum frontman Matt Talbott. On October 28, 2024, it was announced that the band had signed with Closed Casket Activities, and concurrently released a new single, "Unbelonging," from their then-upcoming fourth album. Last Leg of the Human Table was released on February 28, 2025.

== Musical style and legacy ==
Critics have categorised Cloakroom's music as shoegaze, grungegaze, doomgaze, emo, post-hardcore and slowcore. Early in their career, the band identified as "stoner emo", and briefly as "shroomgaze", in reference to psychoactive psilocybin mushroom. They incorporate elements of grunge, country music, indie rock, post-rock and sludge metal. Their early releases on Run for Cover Records were a heavy form of emo. Following their 2017 signing to Relapse Records, they pursued a more metal-indebted direction.

Cloakroom have cited influences including Mudhoney, Nirvana, Swervedriver, Hum, Failure, Russian Circles, Foo Fighters, the Cure, Joy Division, Jason Molina, Townes Van Zandt, Tom Petty, Boards of Canada, Sweet Cobra, Morrissey, the Beatles, Wire, Television, Codeine and Earth.

Cloakroom were key player in broadening the sonic pallet of the emo revival movement. They were one of the earliest bands to merge the emo revival outgrowth soft grunge with shoegaze, pioneering the grungegaze genre. They have been cited as an influence by Greet Death.

== Members ==
Current members

- Doyle Martin – lead vocals, guitar (2012–present)
- Bobby Markos – bass (2012–present)
- Tim Remis – drums, backing vocals (2019–present)
- Cam Smith – guitar (2024–present)

Past members

- Brian Busch – drums, backing vocals (2012–2019)

== Discography ==
=== Studio albums ===
- Further Out (2015)
- Time Well (2017)
- Dissolution Wave (2022)
- Last Leg of the Human Table (2025)

=== EPs ===
- Infinity (2013)
- Cloakroom on Audiotree Live (2013)

=== Singles ===
- "Autumnal Equinox Singles" (2013)
- "Lossed Over" (2014)
- "Big World" (2016)
- "Steve Albini's Blues" (2017)
- "You Don't Know How" (2018)
- "A Force at Play" (2021)
- "Lost Meaning" (2021)
- "Fear of Being Fixed" (2022)
- "Unbelonging" (2024)
