= Grown Ups (band) =

American emo band

- Origin: Chicago, Illinois and Furnessville, Indiana, United States
- Genres: Midwest emo; pop punk; math rock
- Years active: 2009–2011
- Labels: Big Scary Monsters; Topshelf; Doghouse
- Spinoff of: Lion of the North
- Past members: Jacob Bonham; Doyle Martin; Adam Sheets; Andy Tokarski

Grown Ups was an American emo band from Chicago, Illinois and Furnessville, Indiana.

== History ==
Their sound combined Emo and Screamo with Indie rock, Math rock and Pop punk. They released one full-length album, More Songs, under the London, Britain-based Big Scary Monsters label, later re-released by American label, Topshelf Records.

They have toured Europe and the United Kingdom.

They released "Hand Holder" EP/7" on Doghouse Records in 2011.

Doyle Martin went on to form the band Cloakroom, as well as play guitar in the band Nothing.

== Members ==
- Jacob Bonham – drums
- Jae Cope – vocals, bass
- Doyle Martin – vocals, guitar
- Adam Sheets – electric guitar
- Andy Tokarski – bass

== Discography ==
=== Studio album ===
- More Songs (Big Scary Monsters, Topshelf Records) (2010)

=== EPs ===
- Songs (Kid Sister Everything) (2009)
- Handholder (Doghouse Records) (2011)

=== Splits ===
- Gotta Groove SXSW Promo 2011: Split with The Clippers, Empire! Empire! (I Was a Lonely Estate) (Count Your Lucky Stars, Topshelf Records) (2011)
- Split with Brighter Arrows, Raw Nerve, Cloud Mouth (2011)
