= Nu gaze =

2000s shoegaze revival movement

- Years active: 2000s
- Location: Europe, North America
- Influences: Shoegaze

A sample of Silversun Pickups's song "Panic Switch", from their 2009 album Swoon.

Nu gaze (also typeset as nu-gaze and sometimes known as second-wave shoegaze) was an international shoegaze revival movement that took place during the 2000s. The movement was influenced by the original shoegaze movement but embraced a more diverse array of influences, particularly from electronic music. Often, bands in the movement were faster and included cleaner production than those in shoegaze's first-wave.

Nu gaze began around 2000, with England's My Vitriol, Sweden's the Radio Dept. and France's M83. The 2003 soundtrack for the film Lost in Translation helped accelerate the revival when Deerhunter, Maps and Asobi Seksu began to gain attention. The movement had declined by 2013, succeeded by a separate shoegaze revival including DIIV, Cheatahs and Wild Nothing. During the 2020s, nu gaze's name was adopted for a separate genre: those merging elements of shoegaze and nu metal.

== Characteristics ==
Pitchfork described nu-gaze as a diverse spectrum of bands from around the world who incorporated both analog and digital production in their shoegaze-adjacent sound and approach. In nu gaze, tempos were often faster than traditional shoegaze, and vocals were mixed more prominently. Often, bands showed an influence from 1990s shoegaze, blending jangly indie with layers of distortion.

== Etymology ==
=== 2000s–2010s: Origins ===
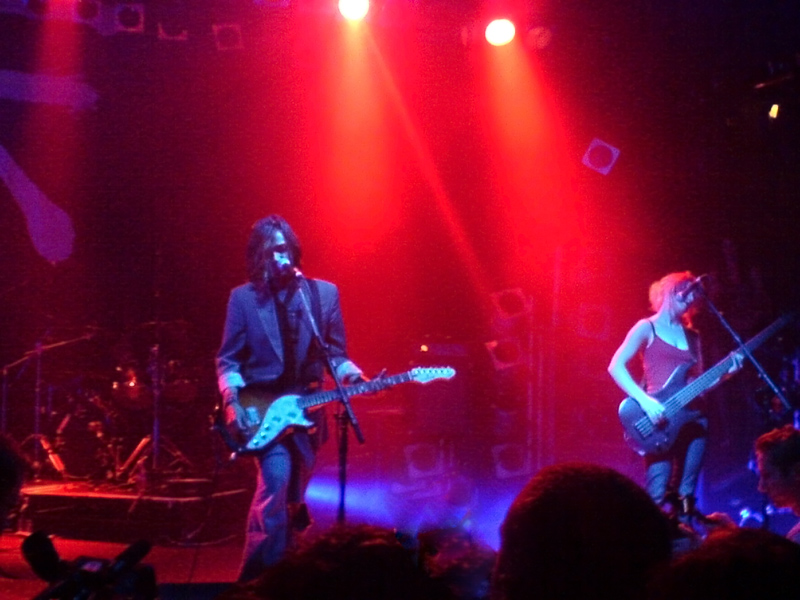
My Vitriol vocalist Som Wardner is often credited as coining the name "nu gaze"

As early as 2001, My Vitriol vocalist Som Wardner had identified his band using the name "nu-gaze". By 2005, it had been used to describe Ambulance LTD, and by 2006 to describe the Morning After Girls. In 2007, Jude Rogers of the Guardian noted the name as being used interchangeably with "stargaze" and "shoetronica", crediting their popularity as due to a stigma around the name "shoegaze".

In a 2009 editorial for Drowned in Sound, Cramp dismissed nu-gaze as a "bad pun", emphasizing that it was not a distinct music scene but rather a renewed interest in shoegaze. By the 2010s, nu gaze was largely used synonymously with the phrase "second-wave shoegaze".

=== 2020s: Semantic shift ===
By the 2020s, "nu gaze" had fallen out of common use. During 2023, the term saw a revived use on internet forum sites Reddit and 4chan, where a semantic shift took place from meaning second-wave shoegaze to instead refer to the fusion of nu metal and shoegaze practiced by grungegaze bands Bleed and later Narrow Head. This definition has been stated by Stereogum, Ultimate Guitar, and Epitaph Records. Pitchfork writer Samuel Hyland attested that, in 2025, "nu-gaze" was being used to mean both the fusion of nu metal and shoegaze, as well as new shoegaze.

Eli Enis, former editor of Revolver, noted this fusion as largely descending from the shoegaze-influenced sound of Deftones, listing examples of this style as Narrow Head, Wisp, Loathe, Fleshwater, Trauma Ray, Trxy and Leaving Time. Enis also noted the influence of Title Fight as a core part of the sound, which was echoed by Consumed magazine, who said nu-gaze grew out of soft grunge. In 2026, PopMatters writer Ethan Stewart observed that nu-gaze "crested" in 2025 with releases by Bleed, Fleshwater, Split Chain and Oversize. Kerrang! writer Jake Richardson credited Split Chain as "pioneers of a raucous brand of nu-gaze".

Hyland credited the musician Photographic Memory as the "mastermind" of a new wave of nu-gaze that combined it with element of Soundcloud rap, citing his work with Quannnic, Jane Remover, Wisp, Blair and Daine as examples. According to Claudio Lancia of the Italian magazine Ondarock, the 2020s definition of nu-gaze has a subgenre called zoomergaze, which is defined by being played by musicians born in generation Z. In 2025, a few prominent American news outlets referred to Wisp and her debut album If Not Winter as "nu-gaze".

An article by Splice specified that this definition is explicitly hyphenated as "nu-gaze", while the traditional definition is unhyphenated as "nu gaze".

== History ==
Around 2000, an international wave of bands taking influence from shoegaze began to take shape with England's My Vitriol, Sweden's the Radio Dept. and France's M83. Following the release of their debut album Finelines (2001), My Vitriol experienced a sudden rise in notoriety, its single "Always: Your Way" entering the UK's top 40 charts, leading them to perform at Top Of The Pops, Glastonbury Festival and Reading Festival. The following year the band went on hiatus, leading to the rise in popularity of the Radio Dept. and M83.

The 2003 release of Sofia Coppola's film Lost in Translation helped accelerate the revival, due to its soundtrack being curated by My Bloody Valentine's Kevin Shields. By 2007, the movement had led to an increased notoriety of contemporary albums by artists including Maps, Blonde Redhead, Mahogany, Deerhunter, Asobi Seksu, and Ulrich Schnauss. Other notable acts in the movement included Autolux, Silversun Pickups, Amusement Parks on Fire and Film School.

Nu-gaze had declined by 2013, succeeded by a separate shoegaze revival including DIIV, Cheatahs, Wild Nothing, Younghusband, Echo Lake, Teen and Melody's Echo Chamber.

== See also ==
- Zoomergaze
