= Bleed (band) =

American alternative metal band

- Origin: Dallas, Texas, U.S.
- Genres: Alternative metal; grungegaze; shoegaze; nu gaze
- Years active: 2020–present
- Label: 20 Buck Spin
- Spinoff of: Narrow Head; Garden of Mary
- Members: Ryan Hughes; Noah Boyce; Adam Ackerman; Carson Wilcox; Rubio N

Bleed is an American alternative metal band from Dallas, Texas. The band consists of vocalist-guitarist Ryan Hughes, guitarist Brendan King, bassist Adam Ackerman, drummer Carson Wilcox, and guitarist-programmer Rubio N. Many members are current or past members of Narrow Head or Garden of Mary.

== History ==
Bleed was formed in 2020 by Ryan Hughes, Noah Boyce and Adam Ackerman in Dallas, Texas. The three had previously played together in the band Garden of Mary. After showing their music to Carson Wilcox, former band-mate of Hughes within Narrow Head, he became interested and joined the band.

Bleed's debut EP Somebody's Closer was released independently to digital platforms on September 12, 2021. It features artwork created by Frank Maddocks, a long-time collaborator of bands such as Deftones and Linkin Park. In 2022, the band signed to 20 Buck Spin, with whom the EP was re-issued for physical formats.

On October 5, 2022, Bleed released the single "Killing Time". It was announced as an advanced single for their debut album, where it would appear in a re-recorded form. The song was premiered at Knotfest the day prior. Following the song's release, the band supported Narrow Head on their North American fall tour.

On May 2, 2025, Bleed released their self-titled album. In addition to "Killing Time", two singles were released for the album: "Marathon", with an accompanying music video directed by Colt Matheson, and "Enjoy Your Stay", featuring vocals from Olli Appleyard of Static Dress. The album is the band's first release to represent their mixer Rubio N as a member of the band. Rubio is also a guitarist for Narrow Head, where he is credited as Rubio Richie. Following the album's release, the band supported One Step Closer on their All You Embrace tour throughout May and June.

In collaboration with Audiotree, Bleed released an EP of live recordings on July 29, 2025. Recorded on May 18, this release features guitarist Brendan King as a substitute for Noah Boyce. It is unknown whether this is a temporary or permanent change to the band's lineup.

== Musical style and influences ==
Bleed has been described as alternative metal, shoegaze, nu gaze, grungegaze and alternative rock. They take influence from styles such as post-grunge and nu metal.

They have cited influences such as Linkin Park, Deftones, Helmet, Pulse Ultra, Lo-Pro, Hum, and Nothingface, as well as Pist.On, White Zombie, and The Smashing Pumpkins.

In comparison to Narrow Head, Hughes describes the band's sound as "more aggressive and straightforward".

They have been cited as an influence by Split Chain.

== Members ==
Current members

- Ryan Hughes – guitar, vocals
- Noah Boyce – guitar
- Adam Ackerman – bass
- Carson Wilcox – drums
- Rubio N – guitar, vocals, programming

Touring musicians

- Brendan King – guitar

== Discography ==
=== Studio albums ===
Title	Details
Bleed	Released: May 2, 2025; Label: 20 Buck Spin; Formats: Download, streaming, LP, CD, cassette

=== Extended plays ===
Title	Details
Somebody's Closer	Released: September 12, 2021 (self-released), March 2, 2022 (reissue); Label: Self-released/20 Buck Spin; Formats: Download, streaming, LP, cassette
Bleed on Audiotree Live	Released: July 29, 2025; Label: Audiotree; Formats: Download, streaming

=== Singles ===
Title	Year	Album
"Killing Time"	2022	Bleed
"Marathon"	2025	Bleed
"Enjoy Your Stay" (with Static Dress)	2025	Bleed
