= Grungegaze =

Subgenre of soft grunge music

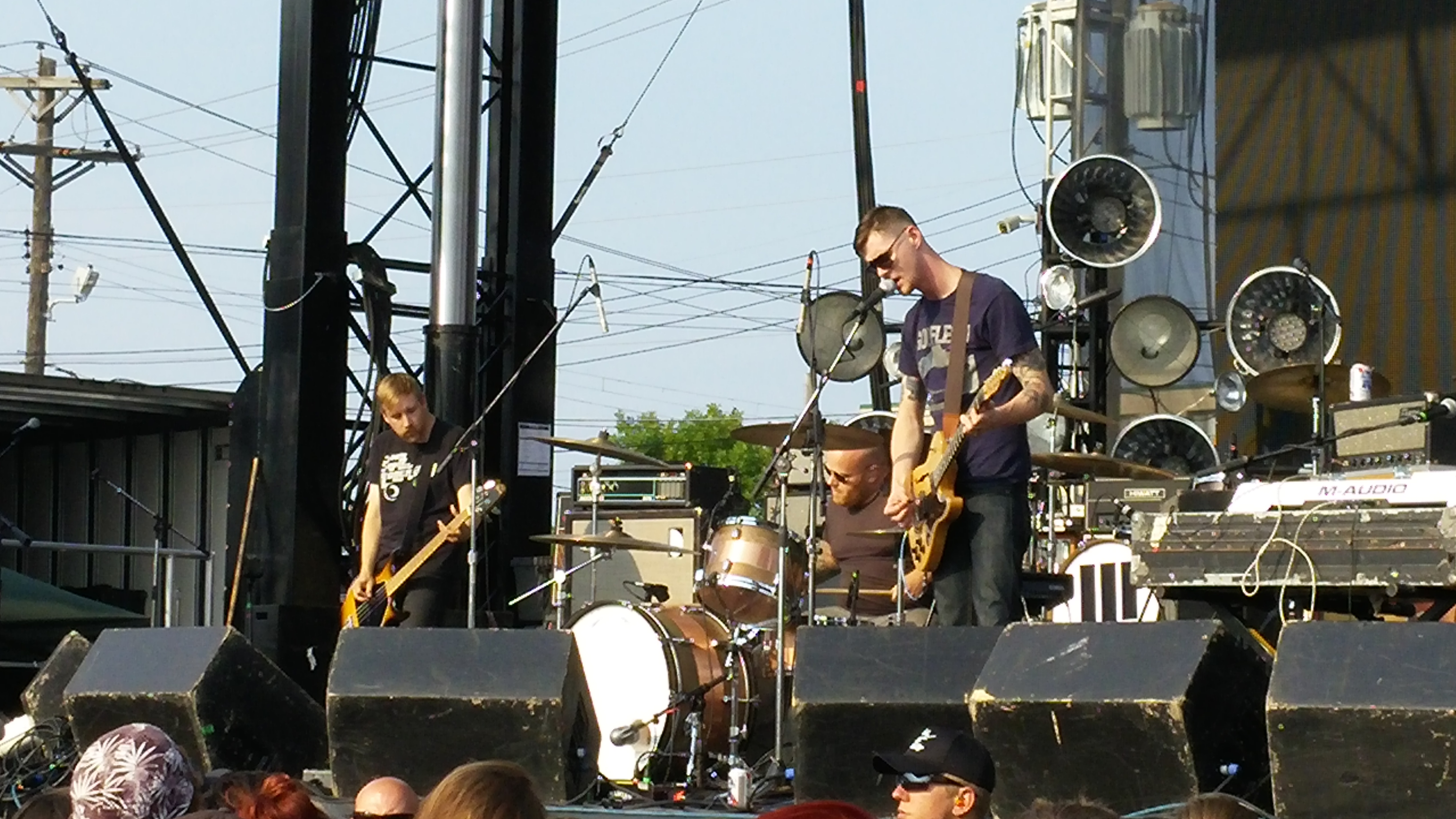
- Cloakroom's Infinity (2013) was one of the earliest grungegaze releases
- Other names: Dreamo
- Stylistic origins: Soft grunge; shoegaze; grunge
- Cultural origins: Early to mid-2010s, United States and United Kingdom
- Derivative forms: Nu-gaze; zoomergaze

Other topics
- Heavy shoegaze; alternative metal; post-grunge; grunge revival

Grungegaze (also known as dreamo) is a subgenre of rock music that grew out of soft grunge. It is characterized by shoegaze's use of effects units, emo-inspired melodies and grunge's dynamic songwriting, using both soft reverb-heavy guitars during verses and crescendos of fuzz during choruses.

During the 2010s, soft grunge has been closely related to the hardcore scene's 2010s shoegaze revival, with both styles sharing musical characteristics and sometimes being conflated by fans and critics. Grungegaze originated in the mid-2010s, when soft grunge bands embraced the influence of shoegaze, with the debut releases by Cloakroom, Narrow Head and Nevermind Me. The genre was further popularized during the 2020s by American bands Narrow Head, Fleshwater and Glare, and British bands Oversize and Split Chain. By 2024, it was one of the most dominant sounds in shoegaze. It was widely influential upon shoegaze in the 2020s, helping to develop the genres nu-gaze and zoomergaze.

== Etymology ==
During the 2010s, Spotify had used the genre tag "dreamo" to describe the genre, which is a portmanteau of "emo" and "dream" (referencing its reverb-heavy guitars). "Grungegaze" was uncommon during this time. In 2021, Spotify began also tagging the genre as "grungegaze", which was the common name by 2023. In 2013, Bearded Magazine had used the term for Nevermind Me, while in 2017 Vice Media had used it to refer to Goon.

== Characteristics ==
Grungegaze makes use of simple, heavy guitar riffs, thick guitar tones, hazey production and dynamics where verses are soft and choruses are loud. Clash writer Tom Morgan compared the genre's lyrics to "teenage bedroom poetry", noting them as "vague" and "undercooked". Often, vocals are subdued in verses. It is rooted in soft grunge music and fourth-wave emo, incorporating grunge, shoegaze and alternative metal, and making use of emo-influenced melodies and harmonies. Songs emphasise crescendos, incorporating grunge's energy, and shoegaze's use of effects units.

Everything Is Noise writer Carlos Vélez-Cancel called it "grunge and shoegaze-influenced alt rock", noting it as caring more about "immersion". Pittsburgh City Paper called it a fusion of "hardcore, metal, and alt-rock into a new idiom", calling it a "genre-agnostic landscape". Treblezine writer Tom Morgan called it "a blend of grunge and shoegaze with emo and hardcore elements thrown in".

Bands in the genre often use a visuals inspired by the Y2K aesthetic, particularly through VHS-inspired videography.

== History ==
=== Precursors ===
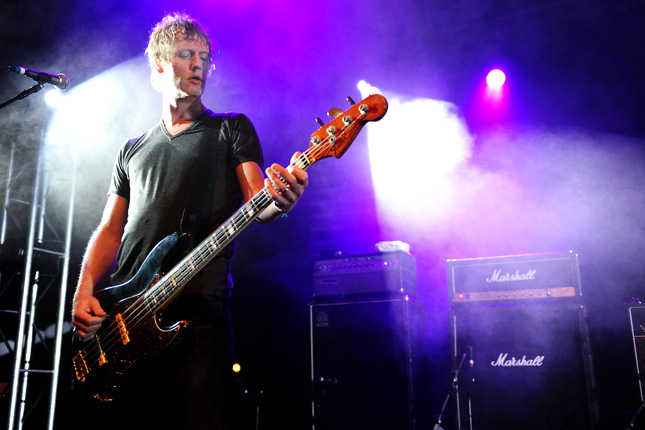
Swervedriver, an early band to merge grunge and shoegaze

During the 1990s, some bands incorporated elements of both grunge and shoegaze, including Swervedriver, Hum, Catherine Wheel, Failure, Smashing Pumpkins, Quicksand and Deftones.

During the 2010s, a wave of musicians from the hardcore punk scene began to play shoegaze, including Nothing, Whirr, Deafheaven, King Woman, Oathbreaker and Pity Sex. Within this scene, many bands subtracted the more experimental elements of the original shoegaze sound, favoring a more mid-tempo metal-influenced rhythmic structure, simpler chords and favoring dynamics. The most influential in this sound was Nothing, with Whirr also being a pioneer. Palermo expressed that with the release of Nothing's debut Guilty of Everything (2014), the band "felt awkward holding onto anything, like shoegaze or whatever", and that no separate tag was being applied to it. Patrick Lyons, the article's writer, discussed the style using the broad terms "heavy shoegaze" or "post-shoegaze". At the same time, Pity Sex merged shoegaze with elements of emo, particularly its bouncy rhythms. Their debut album Feast of Love (2013) was influential. In a 2023 article, Sacher stated that "Feast of Love imitators continue to pop up today", calling "emogaze" a "now-crowded realm". Soft grunge bands often performed alongside, signed to the same labels and had elements in common with the hardcore scene's shoegaze revival. Because of this, many critics and fans conflated soft grunge artists into shoegaze, despite its early practitioners not being influenced by the genre. In a 2026 interview with PopMatters, Balance and Composure vocalist Jon Simmons credited this to how "somewhere along the line, people started thinking if a band uses reverb then it is shoegaze".

=== 2013–2016: Origins ===
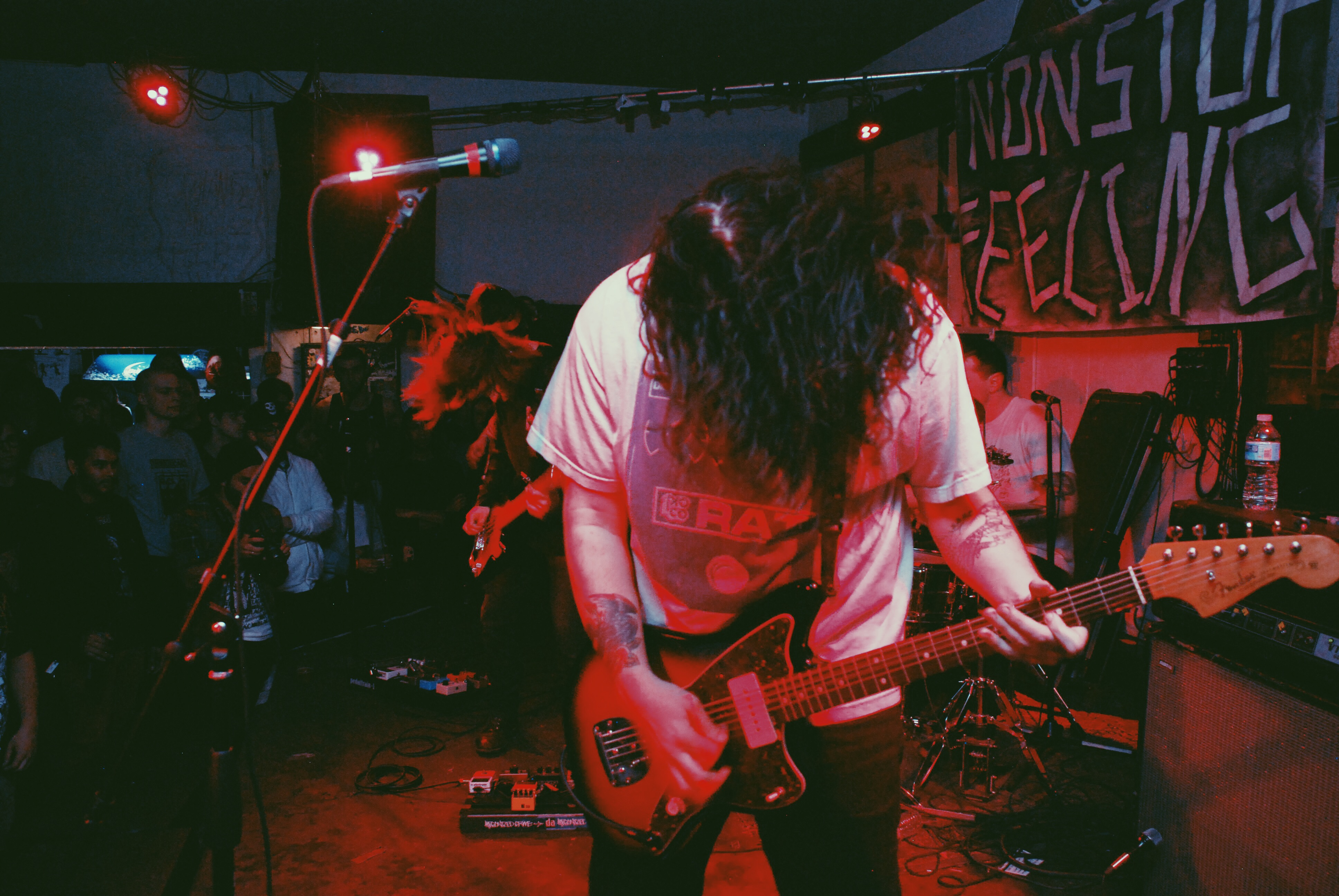
Soft grunge pioneers, Superheaven's second album, Ours Is Chrome (2015), saw them shift their sound to grungegaze

In 2013, albums began to be released that featured soft grunge music but incorporated the influence of shoegaze. These included Narrow Head's Demonstration MMXIII (27 May 2013), Cloakroom's Infinity (16 June 2013) and Nevermind Me's Nevermind Me (9 September 2013). The following year, Leatherneck and Simmer established a grungegaze in Cheshire, England. Nothing pivoted into the genre on their 2014 split album Whirr / Nothing, continued on their second album Tired of Tomorrow (2016), with the tracks "Vertigo Flowers" and "Curse of the Sun".

On their second album Ours Is Chrome, soft grunge band Superheaven transitioned into the genre. BrooklynVegan editor Andrew Sacher called them "grungegaze trailblazers". In 2015, Ox-Fanzine writer, Tim Masson called the album "one of the most important alternative rock—or, if you prefer, emo-grunge-rock—albums of recent times", noting that they "progressed... to the point where they themselves can be considered a benchmark for others".

Turnover's second album Peripheral Vision merged soft grunge with elements of dream pop and shoegaze. The album reached number 14 on the Billboard independent albums chart and was widely influential, Movements vocalist Patrick Miranda stated in a 2025 interview that "Every band wanted to sound like Title Fight Floral Green. Every local band... until Turnover put out Peripheral Vision and then it was like the whole scene flipped". Title Fight's third album Hyperview pushed their soft grunge sound more atmosopheric, in a way that bordered on shoegaze. In a 2025 retrospective article, former Revolver editor Eli Enis stated "Hyperview was dubbed a shoegaze record mostly by people who didn't know what shoegaze was beyond Nothing, Whirr, Pity Sex, and Deafheaven... but had such a marked influence on a genre it doesn't even belong to". The success of Title Fight, as well as Deafheaven and Nothing, caused shoegaze to become a trend in the hardcore scene.

=== 2016–present: Popularization ===
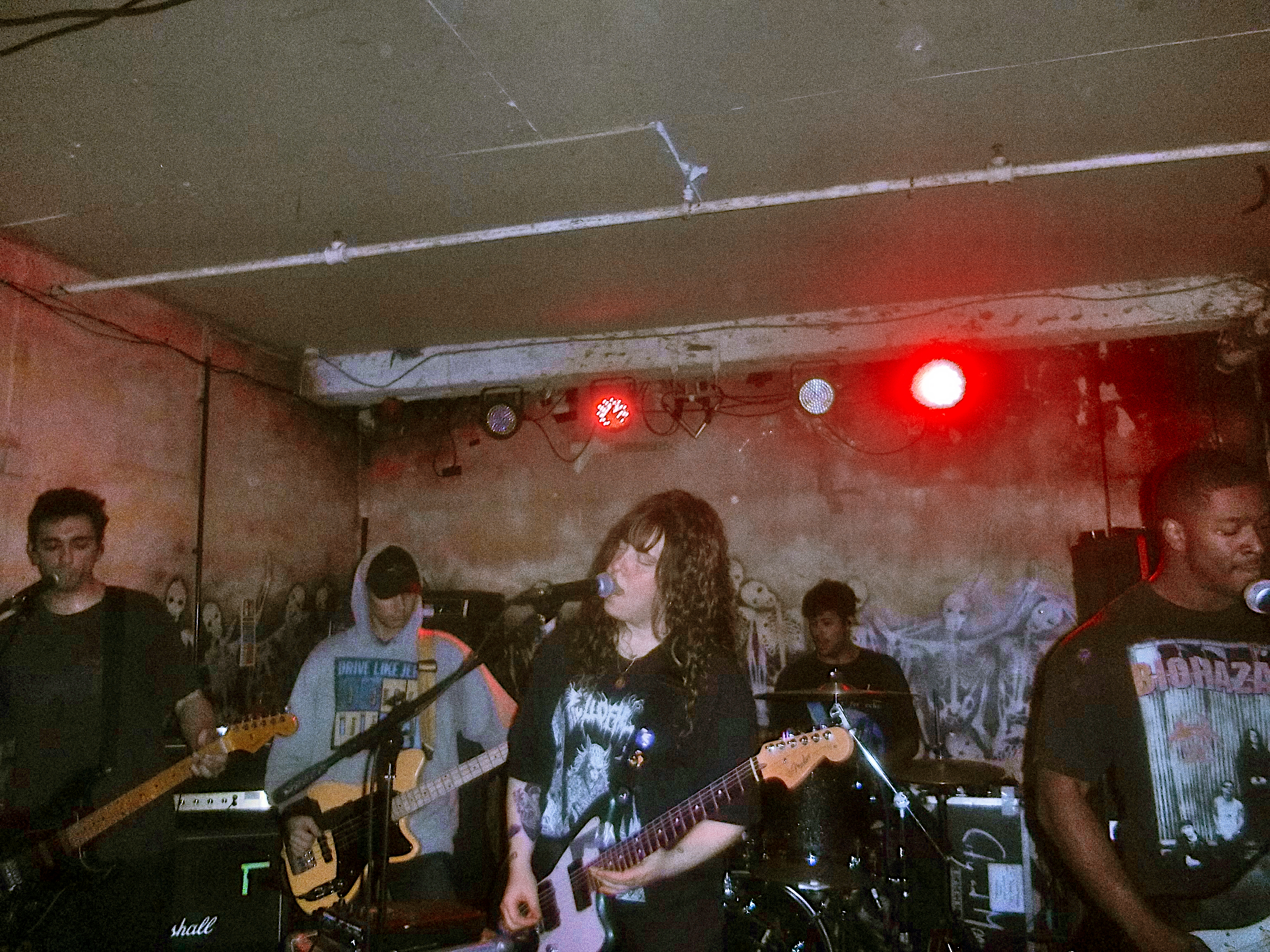
Fleshwater helped to popularize grungegaze in the 2020s

During the late 2010s, Teenage Wrist, Modern Color, Oversize, Endless Heights and Soul Blind began to make grungegaze. One of the most prominent scenes at this time was Texas, which housed Narrow Head, Glare, Trauma Ray, DA/ZE and Rain Check. In an interview with NoEcho, DA/ZE vocalist Nikki Isabelle credited the popularity of grungegaze in Texas to festivals Dreamgaze in Austin and Starshine Fest in northern Texas. Enis noted these Texas bands as being particularly "bottom-heavy".

In the early 2020s, Spotify began recommending music that was similar to shoegaze to many users, this coincided with the release of Fleshwater's debut demo demo2020, who reaped its benefits. Fleshwater and Narrow Head were forefront in the popularization of grungegaze, which began around 2023. In 2025, Clash listed "the contemporary grungegaze canon" as Narrow Head, Glare, Modern Color, Soul Blind, Trauma Ray and Leaving Time, alongside British bands Oversize and Split Chain. At this time, Fleshwater, ASkySoBlack and Bleed were pushing the genre in a heavier direction.

Flood Magazine called 2024 "a momentous year for the revivals of grunge and shoegaze" when discussing grungegaze band Nara's Room. By December 2024, grungegaze was one of the most prominent sounds in shoegaze, with its most dominant sound being what Stereogum writer Eli Enis called "boneless Deftones clones". He also noted traditional-style shoegaze bands as moving towards the sound, particularly Glixen, who he called "one of the most popular – and polarizing – shoegaze bands of the last couple years". In a separate article from that year, Enis critiqued the genre as being unvaried and oversaturated. By the next year, Sacher had called it "a trend to the point of oversaturation". In December 2025, Pitchfork published its list of the 100 Best Songs of 2025, stating that Turnstile's opening title track from their 2025 album Never Enough "erupts into a triumphant grungegaze anthem that you can easily imagine usurping the Foo Fighters' 'My Hero' as the soundtrack of choice for NFL playoffs bumper montages."

In New York City and New Jersey bands based around Douglas Dulgarian's record label Julia's War Records including MX Lonely, Shower Curtain, High and Glaring Orchid built upon the grungegaze sound but pushed the vocals rawer and more aggressive than were common in the genre.

== Legacy ==
In 2021, Bleed released their debut EP Somebody's Closer, which merged grungegaze with nu metal, pioneering the genre nu-gaze. The members' other band Narrow Head too began to incorporate these elements on their third album Moments of Clarity. On their 2025 albums, Fleshwater and Oversize similarly pivoted. Kerrang! writer Jake Richardson credited Split Chain as "pioneers of a raucous brand of nu-gaze". Grungegaze was also influential upon some artists in the zoomergaze genre, such as Wisp and Quannnic.

Hundredth noted influences from grungegaze on their 2025 album Faded Splendor.

Eli Enis credited Julie and Western Haikus as two bands subverting grungegaze's dominance in the 2020s.

== See also ==
- Grunge revival
- Alternative metal
