= Fleshwater =

American rock band

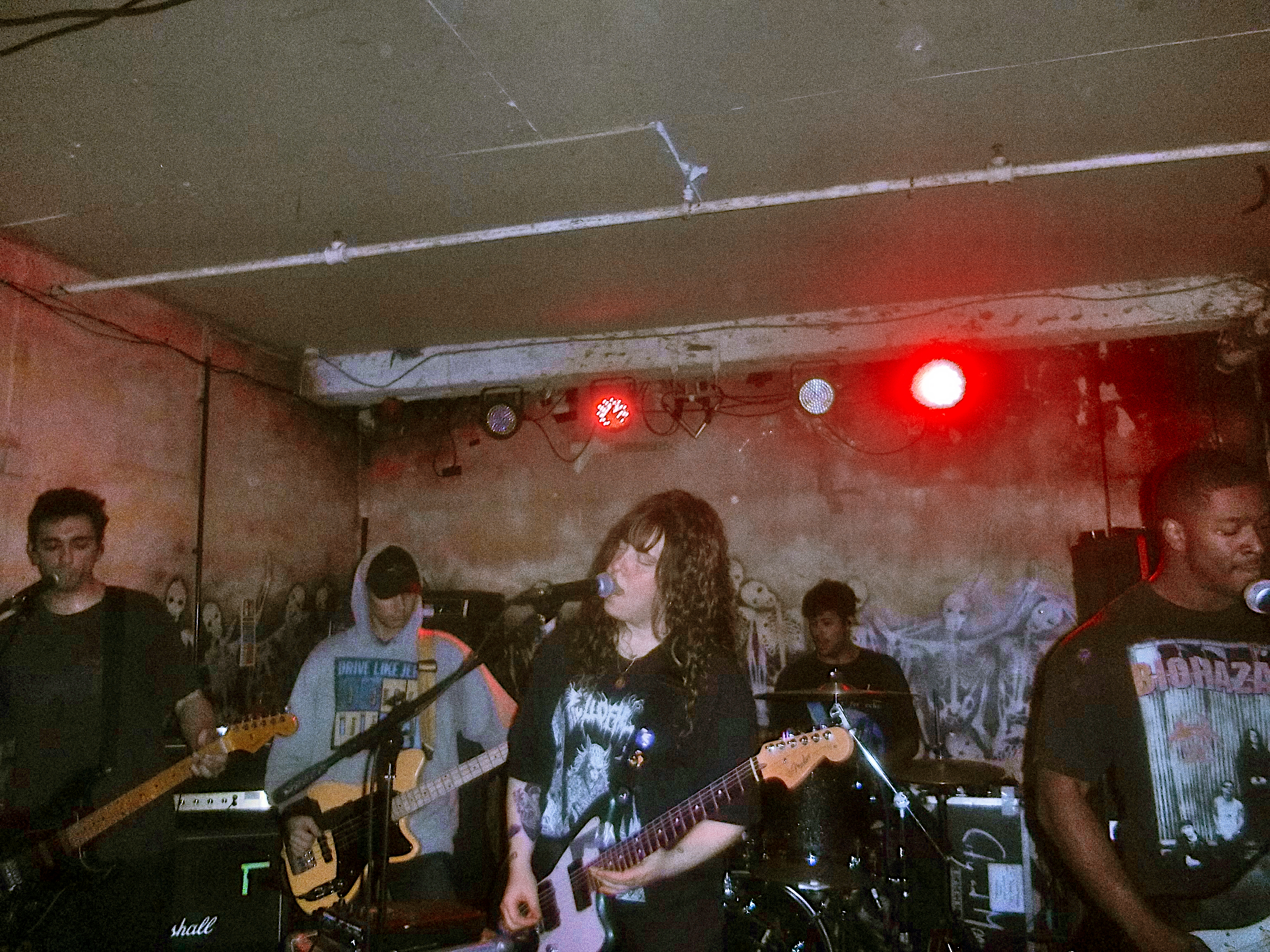
- Fleshwater performing live in 2024. From left to right: DiDio, Martin, Shirar, Soto Ramos, Lhaubouet

Background information
- Also known as: Linda Claire
- Origin: Boston, Massachusetts, U.S.
- Genres: Alternative metal; grungegaze; shoegaze; soft grunge; nu-gaze
- Years active: 2017–present
- Label: Closed Casket Activities
- Spinoff of: Vein.fm
- Members: Marisa Shirar; Anthony DiDio; Jeremy Martin; Jonathan Lhaubouet; Josian Ramos
- Past members: Matt Wood
- Website: fleshwater.fm

Fleshwater is an American rock band formed in Boston in 2017. The band was formed by Anthony DiDio (vocals, guitars), and Matt Wood (drums) of Vein.fm, with their Vein.fm bandmate Jeremy Martin (bass) and Marisa Shirar (lead vocals, guitars, keyboards) joining two years after the band's formation. The band currently consists of DiDio, Shirar, Martin, Jonathan Lhaubouet (guitars), and Josian Ramos (drums).

== History ==
The band was formed by vocalist and guitarist Anthony DiDio and drummer Matt Wood, who are also members of Vein.fm. They were joined by bassist Jeremy Martin, also of Vein.fm, and lead vocalist Marisa Shirar. The first concept of the group dates back to 2017 when DiDio and Wood wrote three songs. It is speculated that the band’s name comes from the track “Flesh & Water,” released by DiDio from his experimental solo project Death_fm in 2016. They recorded their first track "Linda Claire" in 2019 with Shirar as the lead vocalist. The following February, they released their debut EP demo2020 containing "Linda Claire". This gained them their first major recognition, amassing a cult following with the track garnering over 1 million Spotify streams.

The band released the single "Kiss the Ladder" on October 6, 2022, alongside the announcement of their debut album We're Not Here to Be Loved. The second single off the album, "The Razor's Apple", was released on October 21. The album was released shortly after, on November 4, and was met with positive reception. The band played their first show on December 19, 2021 in Chicago, Illinois at Subterranean supporting Harm's Way alongside Vein.fm. The band embarked on their first full US tour in May/June 2023 supporting No Pressure alongside Koyo and Illusion. In Fall 2023, the band embarked on a full US tour supporting Harms Way alongside Ingrown & Jivebomb.

On December 26, 2023, the band surprise released the EP Sounds of Grieving. The EP consists of "seven songs reimagined and remixed" from We're Not Here to Be Loved. On December 27, 2024, the band released the non-album single "Standalone".

On September 17, 2024, the band announced that they will be joining Deftones and the Mars Volta on their North American Tour 2025. The first stop of this tour would be Portland, OR on February 25 and the last being in Boston, MA on April 8.

On July 29, 2025, the band announced their second album 2000: In Search Of The Endless Sky, scheduled for release on September 5. The band released two singles for the album: "Jetpack" and "Last Escape". The band also announced a headlining tour beginning on September 17, with support from Angel Du$t and Chat Pile on select dates.

== Musical style ==
Critics have categorized Fleshwater's music as soft grunge, nu-gaze, post-hardcore, alternative metal, nu metal, alternative rock, grungegaze, and shoegaze.

They have cited influences including Sunny Day Real Estate, Dinosaur Jr. and Hum.

They have been cited as an influence by Static Dress, Die Spitz and Split Chain.

== Members ==
=== Current ===
- Anthony DiDio – vocals, guitars (2017–present)
- Marisa Shirar – vocals, guitars, keyboards, sampler (2019–present)
- Jeremy Martin – bass guitar (2019–present)
- Jon Lhaubouet – guitars (2021–present)
- Josian Omar Soto Ramos – drums, percussion (2023–present)

=== Former ===
- Matt Wood – drums, percussion (2017–2023)

== Discography ==
=== Albums ===
List of studio albums
Title	Album details
We're Not Here to Be Loved	Released: November 4, 2022; Label: Closed Casket Activities; Formats: CD, CS, LP, DL
2000: In Search Of The Endless Sky	Released: September 5, 2025; Label: Closed Casket Activities; Formats: CD, CS, LP, DL

=== Extended plays ===
List of extended plays
Title	EP details
demo2020	Released: February 14, 2020; Label: deathfmradio; Formats: CS, DL
Sounds of Grieving	Released: December 26, 2023; Label: Closed Casket Activities; Formats: CD, LP, DL

=== Singles ===
Year	Song	Album
2022	"Kiss the Ladder"	We're Not Here to Be Loved
2022	"The Razor's Apple"	We're Not Here to Be Loved
2024	"Standalone"	Non-album single
2025	"Jetpack"	2000: In Search Of The Endless Sky
2025	"Last Escape"	2000: In Search Of The Endless Sky
