= Kagoule =

British rock band

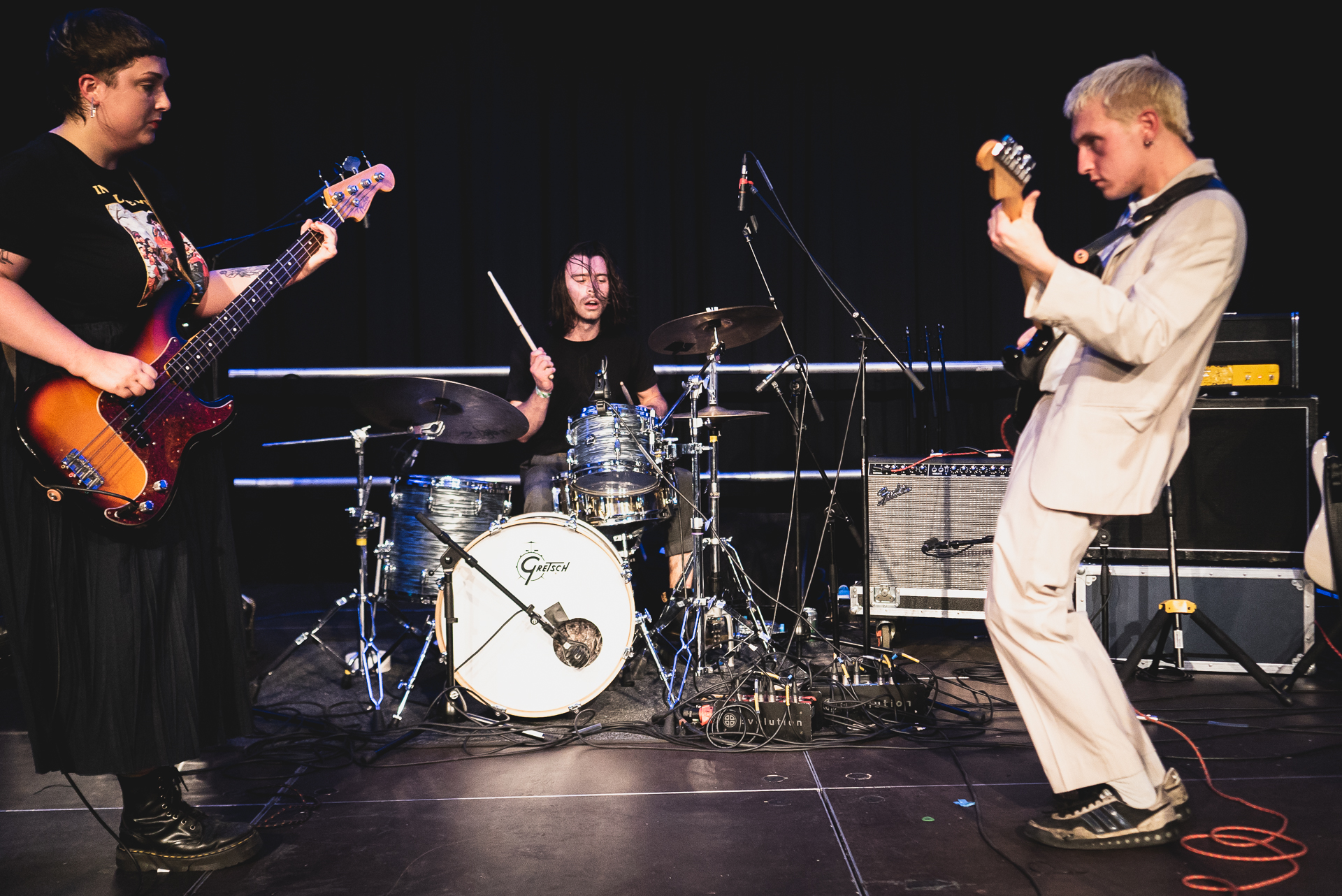

Background information
- Origin: Nottingham, England
- Genres: Indie rock, post-rock, emo, grunge
- Labels: Earache Records, Alcopop! Records
- Members: Cai Burns; Lucy Hatter; Lawrence English
- Website: kagoule.bandcamp.com

Kagoule is an alternative rock band from Nottingham, UK. Formed when the members were in their teens, the line-up consists of Cai Burns (vocals, guitar), Lucy Hatter (bass guitar, vocals) and Lawrence English (drums). They band has released two albums, Urth (2015) on Earache Records and Strange Entertainment (2018) on Alcopop! Records.

== History ==
=== Formation, early years and Urth ===
The band was formed when the members were in their early teens and initially worked with a local record label, Denizen Recordings. In 2014, Kagoule appeared on the BBC Introducing stage at the Glastonbury Festival. They band released several singles before their first album, Urth, was released in 2015 by Earache Records, best known for extreme metal bands such as Napalm Death and Bolt Thrower. The album was well-received by the alternative music press, being described by The Quietus as "an exciting debut album that thrills from beginning to end" and by Louder Than War as "a gorgeous, big bastard brick-shit-house of a record".

=== Strange Entertainment ===
In 2018, the band released its second album, Strange Entertainment, preceded by the single "Egg Hunt"/"Bad Saliva". Strange Entertainment was again well-received by the independent music press. The Line of Best Fit called it "an enthralling and powerful release". In November 2018, the band embarked on a headline UK tour in support of the album.

== Musical style and influences ==
Critics have categorised Kagoule's music as indie rock, grunge revival, emo and post-rock.

Kagoule cite influences including Smashing Pumpkins, Fugazi, Bikini Kill, Bob Tilton, the Pixies. Nirvana, Unwound and many of the groups signed to Dischord Records and Touch and Go Records.

They have been cited as an influence by Muskets.

== Discography ==
=== Albums ===
- Urth (2015), Earache Records
- Strange Entertainment (2018), Alcopop! Records

=== Singles ===
- "Monarchy"/"Mudhole" (2012), Denizen Recordings
- "It Knows It"/"Adjust The Way" (2014), Earache Records
- "Glue"/"Made Of Concrete" (2015), Earache Records
- "The Bastard" (2015), Earache Records
- "Egg Hunt"/"Bad Saliva" (2018) Alcopop! Records
