= Glare (band) =

American shoegaze band

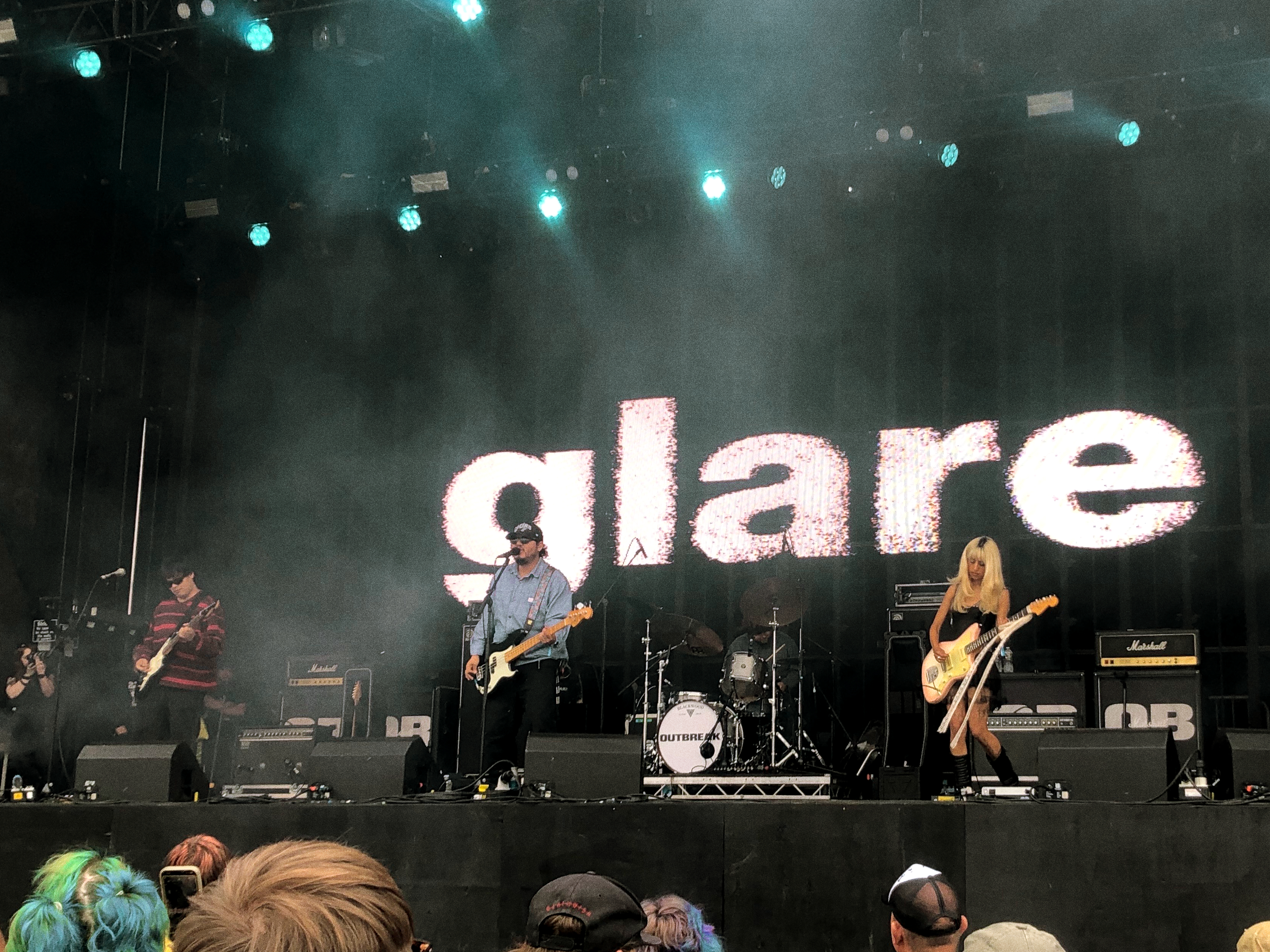
- Glare performing live in 2026

Background information
- Also known as: Dispirit (2014–2017)
- Origin: Lower Rio Grande Valley, Texas, U.S.
- Genres: Grungegaze; shoegaze; soft grunge (early)
- Years active: 2014–present
- Label: Sunday Drive
- Members: Toni Ordaz; Homero Solis
- Past members: Austin Barrientos; Christian Resendez; Jes Morales; John Robert Rojas

Glare is an American grungegaze band from the Lower Rio Grande Valley, Texas. Formed in 2014, under the name Dispirit, their original influences were Superheaven, Title Fight and Basement. Following their 2017 name change, their influences shifted to Nothing and Whirr.

In 2017, they released their debut songs "Into Me" and "Blank". In 2021, they released the EP Heavenly. They released their first album, Sunset Funeral in April 2025. Releasing the single "Mourning Haze" in August 2024.

== Discography ==
=== Albums ===
- Sunset Funeral (2025)

=== EPs ===
- Heavenly (2021)

=== Singles ===
- "Into You" (2017)
- "Void in Blue" (2018)
- "Passing Dream" (2021)
- "Bloom" (2023)
- "Mourning Haze" (2024)
- "Guts" (2025)
- "Nü Burn" (2025)
