= Oversize (band) =

English rock band

- Origin: Salisbury, Wiltshire, UK
- Genres: Grungegaze; shoegaze; alternative metal; nu-gaze
- Years active: 2019–present
- Labels: SharpTone, Church Road
- Spinoff of: Grove Street
- Members: Nick Nowack; Lewis Lennane-Emm; Tazz Edwards; George Lewis; Sam Shutler
- Past members: Sam McCauley

Oversize are an English rock band formed in Salisbury, Wiltshire. Following two years of demos as a three-piece, Oversize officially formed in 2019, consisting of Sam McCauley (vocals) Lewis Lennane-Emm (guitar), Tazz Edwards (guitar), George Lewis (bass) and Sam Shutler (drums). Beginning as an emo band, they had shifted towards a grungegaze sound by the time they began releasing music. Relocating to Bristol, their debut EP In Balance was released in 2021, followed by Into The Ceiling in 2022 through Church Road Records. During this time, they became one of the forefront British bands in the grungegaze genre and the 2020s shoegaze revival, in general. In 2025, they released their debut album Vital Signs, which saw them shift their sound to nu-gaze.

== History ==
In 2017, Grove Street Families guitar Lewis Lennane-Emm finished university, and moved back to his hometown of Salisbury, Wiltshire. There, Lennane-Emm devised the band that would become Oversize, alongside his friend, vocalist Sam McCauley, who in-turn recruited drummer Sam Shutler. This lineup rehearsed and recorded demos in private. At this time, they were writing emo music. In 2019, they recruited bassist George Lewis and guitarist Tazz Edwards, taking the name Oversize. The band consider this to be their formation. They performed two live shows, before the 2020 COVID-19 lockdowns began.

On 9 April 2020, they released the single "My Eyes". By this time, the band was based in Bristol. On 19 July 2021, they released the single "Drive", announcing it would be a part of their debut EP. On 17 December they released their debut EP In Balance. On Friday 24th June, they performed at Outbreak Festival. On 16 September 2022, they released the single "Taste", announcing it would be a part of their second EP. 21 October 2022, they released the second EP Into The Ceiling through Church Road Records.

In Summer 2023, they entered the studio to record their debut album. It was left unreleased, until they signed to SharpTone Records a year later. They announced their singing on 10 October 2024, coinciding with the release of the single "Fall Apart". On 26 November 2024, they released the single "Vital Signs", revealing the album, also titled Vital Signs would be released on 28 February 2025. On 26 November 2024, they announced their debut album, Vital Signs, would be released on 28 February, through Sharptone Records. On 22 January 2025, they released its single "Vacant". They performed at Outbreak Festival on Sunday 15 June 2025, then at the 2025 Reading and Leeds festivals.

== Musical style and legacy ==
Critics have categorised Oversized's music as grungegaze, shoegaze, heavy shoegaze and alternative metal, noting elements of emo, post-hardcore, grunge, hardcore punk, new wave music and indie rock. Their music is often mid-tempo making use of dynamics, guitar effects units units such fuzz and chorus, quiet vocals meloncholic atmospheres and atmospheric elements. Kerrang! described them as playing a "rockier" take on shoegaze, sombre atmosphere, lyrics about grief. NME described their sound as building upon an Americanised shoegaze sound, but putting a British spin on it. AllMusic called their music a "heady blend of retro-alternative rock and modern production".

On Vital Signs (2025) their songs became more groove-driven, began incorporating breakbeats and incorporating elements of nu metal. Critics categorised the album as nu-gaze and grungegaze.

They have cited influences including Turnover, Smashing Pumpkins, Jimmy Eat World, Blink-182, the Pixies, Hum, Snapcase, Helmet, Quicksand and Britpop. In a 2025 interview with Podioslave, Lennane-Emm said the band's intention was "to sound like Sunny Day Real Estate meets Smashing Pumpkins". and in an interview the same year with NME, he stated "the bands that originally inspired us were all English or Irish".

Oversize are one of the forefront bands in the UK section of the 2020s shoegaze revival, helping to define the UK leg of the grungegaze genre. They have been cited as an influence by Split Chain.

== Members ==
Current

- Nick Nowack – Vocals
- Lewis Lennane-Emm – Guitar
- Tazz Edwards – Guitar
- George Lewis – Bass
- Sam Shutler – Drums

Former

- Sam McCauley - Vocals

== Discography ==
Studio albums

- Vital Signs (2025)

EPs

- In Balance (2021)
- Into the Ceiling (2022)
