= Split Chain =

British rock band

- Origin: Bristol, England
- Genres: Grungegaze; nu-gaze
- Years active: 2023–present
- Label: Epitaph
- Members: Roberto Martínez-Cowles; Jake Reid; Tom Davies; Aaron Black
- Past members: Oliver Bowles
- Website: www.splitchain.uk

Split Chain are an English rock band formed in Bristol in 2023. The line-up consists of vocalist Bert Martínez-Cowles, bassist Tom Davies, drummer Aaron Black and guitarists Oli Bowles and Jake Reid.

== History ==
The band were formed from the remnants of other local bands, including Pushing Daisies, Ursus and Roads to Nowhere. The band released their debut single, "Get Inside", on 14 April 2023, with a further three singles following that year.

In 2024, they released a further three singles, a re-worked version of their 2023 single "Extract", featuring Softcult and renamed to "(Re)-Extract", along with a cover of Type O Negative's "I Don't Wanna Be Me", which they had been performing live at shows prior.

After signing with Epitaph Records in 2024, they announced that their debut studio album, Motionblur, would be released on 11 July 2025. They also announced a North American tour with Silverstein starting in January 2024.

In March 2025, the band released a limited vinyl pressing of an EP called 'SC.001', which contains all seven of their singles released in 2023 and 2024 in one collection, not including their collab with Soft Cult or their Type O Negative cover.

On the approach to the release of their debut album, the band have toured throughout the UK, Europe and United States - including a debut headline tour of the US. They showcased new material at summer festivals Mystic Festival and Download Festival. By the time their debut album would release they would have opened for acts including A Day To Remember, Superheaven, Trophy Eyes, Boston Manor and Thursday.

== Musical style ==
Critics have categorised Split Chain's music as nu-gaze, grungegaze. The band combine nu metal and shoegaze, while also incorporating elements of grunge. They call themselves "dreamo".

Split Chain cite influences including Narrow Head, Bleed, Fleshwater, Balance and Composure, Title Fight, Static-X, Hum, Oversize, Superheaven, Soul Blind, Brutus, Linkin Park, t.A.T.u, Creed, Basement, Bodyweb, Love is Noise, Amira Elfeky, Day Aches, Forager, Higher Power, Modern Color, Killing Me Softly, Black Coast, Teenage Wrist, CKY, Good Charlotte, Blink-182, Limp Bizkit, Slipknot, Deftones, emo revival, grunge revival, darkwave, new wave music and "wrestle metal".

== Discography ==
=== Albums ===
- motionblur (2025)

=== EPs ===
- SC.001 (2025)

=== Singles ===
- "Get Inside" (2023)
- "Future" (2023)
- "Extract" (2023)
- "Chalk" (2023)
- "Fade" (2024)
- "Descend" (2024)
- "Haven" (2024)
- "(Re)-Extract" (2024)
- "I Don't Wanna Be Me" (2024)
- "I’m Not Dying to Be Here" (2025)
- "bored.tired.torn" (2025)
- "Subside" (2025)
- "who am i?" (2025)
- "Scatterbrain" (2026)
- "sylvia (i won't belong to you)" (2026)
