= One Step Closer (band) =

American hardcore band

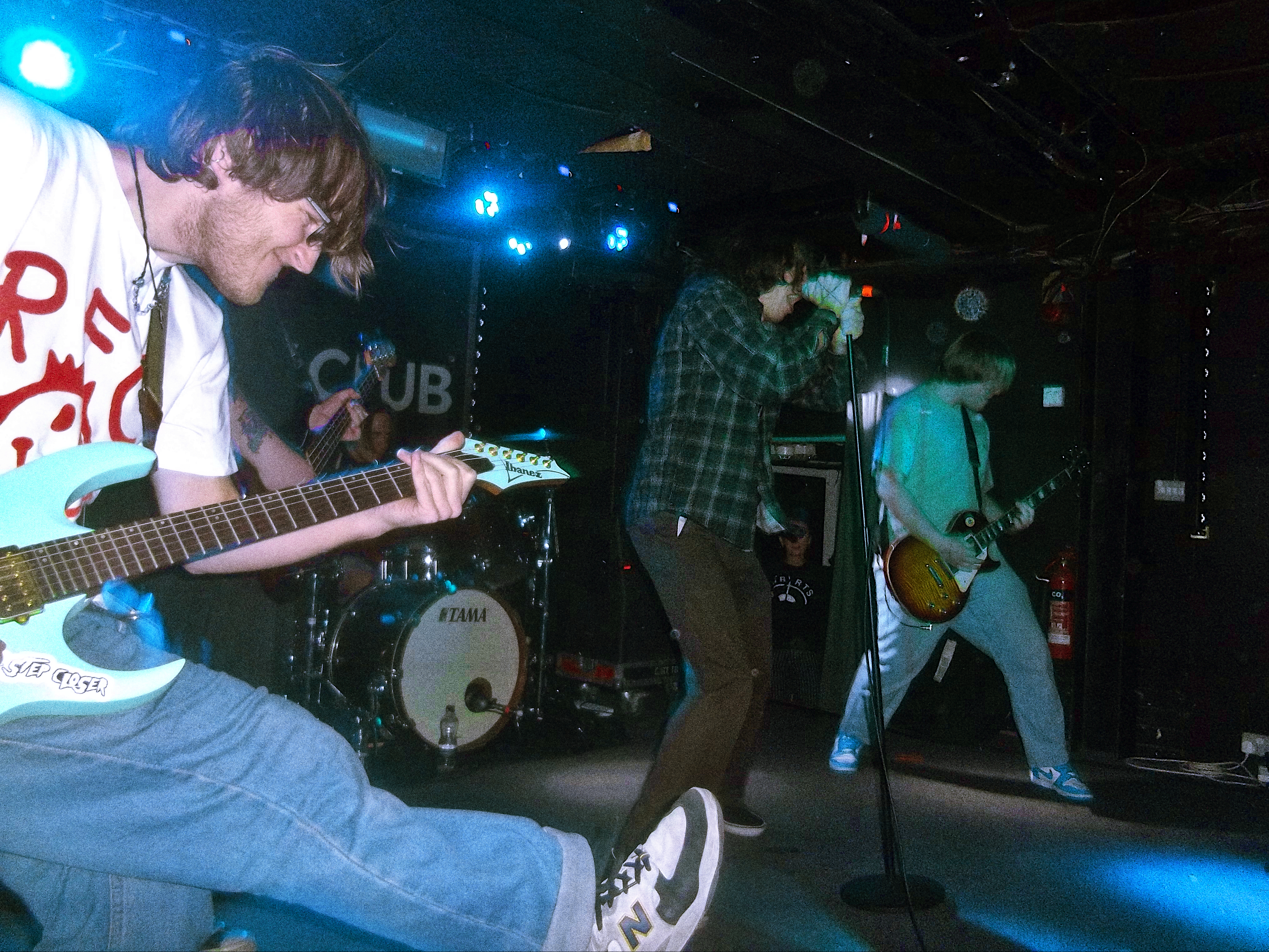
- One Step Closer performing in 2022

Background information
- Origin: Wilkes-Barre, Pennsylvania, U.S.
- Genres: Melodic hardcore; emo; soft grunge
- Years active: 2016–present
- Labels: Run for Cover; Triple B; Revelation
- Members: Ryan Savitski; Ross Thompson; Tommy Norton; Colman O'Brien
- Past members: Brian Talipan; Grady Allen; Tom Pisano; Caleb Hartnett
- Website: onestepcloserwb.com

One Step Closer is an American straight edge hardcore punk band from Wilkes-Barre, Pennsylvania. The band is currently signed to Run for Cover Records. The band was named one of Stereogum's "Bands To Watch". The band's debut album, This Place You Know, was released in 2021 to positive reviews. BrooklynVegan calls them "one of the most exciting new bands in hardcore".

== Musical style and influences ==
One Step Closer's earliest music was a part of the youth crew revival of the 2010s, with music largely inspired by Turning Point.

By the 2020s, they had shifted their sound towards melodic hardcore. Their influences were Turning Point, Inside Out, Title Fight, Blink-182, Green Day, Have Heart, Bane, Sunny Day Real Estate, the Get-Up Kids, Box Car Racer, the Cure and Mineral. Upset Magazine writer Rob Mair described their music of this era as merging "classic DC emo with youth crew passion and late 90s melodic hardcore approachability to create a sound inspired by hardcore's past but beholden to no single scene." At this time, they made use of elements of indie rock, post-hardcore and shoegaze.

On All You Embrace (2024), they shifted their sound towards emo grunge and emo. At this time, their influences were Basement, Title Fight, Deftones, Jawbreaker, Oasis, True Widow, Failure, the Smashing Pumpkins, Rival Schools, the Cure and Mock Orange. Of this era, Savitski said that the members "have always been leaning into the emo-core sound. We are finally taking the bigger step into what we’ve been wanting to do for a while now." Punknews noted the album as similar to the emo and screamo artists involved in the wave.

== Members ==
=== Current ===
- Colman O'Brien – guitar (2022–present)
- Tommy Norton – drums (2019–present), guitar (2016–2019)
- Ryan Savitski – vocals (2016–present)
- Ross Thompson – guitar (2021–present)
- Caleb Hogue – drums (2019–present)

=== Former members ===
- Brian Talipan – bass (2016–2022)
- Grady Allen – guitar (2019–2021)
- Tom Pisano – drums (2016–2019)

=== Live members ===
- Alex Wizard – drums
- Jake Thomas - bass (2022-2024)

== Discography ==
=== Studio albums ===
- This Place You Know (2021, Run For Cover)
- All You Embrace (2024, Run For Cover)

=== EPs ===
- O.S.C. Demo (2016, Silverwood Records)
- One Step Closer (2017, self-released)
- Promo (2017, self-released)
- From Me to You (2019, Triple-B Records)
- Promo 2020 (2020, Triple-B Records)
- Songs for the Willow (2023, Run For Cover Records)
