= Moments of Clarity (album) =

Studio album by Narrow Head
- Released: February 10, 2023
- Genre: Alternative rock; hard rock; shoegaze
- Length: 48:40
- Language: English
- Label: Run for Cover
- Producer: Sonny Diperri; Lil Aaron; Narrow Head

Narrow Head chronology
| 12th House Rock (2020) | Moments of Clarity (2023) |

Professional ratings
Review scores
| Source | Rating |
|---|---|
| Kerrang! | 4/5 stars |
| Pitchfork | 6.6/10 |
| Sputnikmusic | 3.7/5 |

"We just drilled all the songs and dissected every part of every song and did anything we could to make the songs as good as possible/ So for people like us who write songs, it's kind of a dream to have that luxury ... And it's nice to have a person that you trust to tell you what's working and what's not, so you don't have to sit and fucking analyze yourself forever."

—Guitarist Kora Puckett on the extensive recording process for Moments of Clarity

Moments of Clarity is the third studio album by American hard rock group Narrow Head, released on Run for Cover Records. The album expands on the group's sound, incorporating influences from 1990s alternative rock and shoegaze and has been compared to Hum and The Smashing Pumpkins, while the band also cites Deftones and My Bloody Valentine as influences.

== Reception ==
In Kerrang!, Olly Thomas characterized the music's sound as "dream-grunge" and it sounds "like a hearty embrace from a band proving themselves capable of great things"; he scored the album 4 out of 5. Writing for Pitchfork, Mia Hughes rated this release a 6.6 out of 10, noting a "muddy emotional mix" in the lyrics, alongside "tension and release" in the music, criticizing some of the middle of the album, but calling the work "an effective illustration of the process of clawing your way to some meaning, knowing that otherwise you'll be destroyed" at its best. Sputnikmusic published two reviews for this release: staffer jesper scored it a 3.7 out of 5, stating that certain tracks are excellent and the album "leaves me wishing for a bit more in spite of its clearly cohesive consistency", while contributor Teal rated it a 4.0 out of 5, stating that "there is something really refreshing about Narrow Head's one-track mind for writing, recording, and playing humble and honest dreamy hard rock in this day and age".

On June 23, Alternative Press published an unranked list of the top 25 albums of the year to date and included this release, publishing that "the Houston outfit are in their bag here, employing thick distortion, renewed purpose, and all-consuming emotions to drive their message home".

== Track listing ==
1. "The Real" – 3:30
2. "Moments of Clarity" – 3:50
3. "Sunday" – 3:18
4. "Trepanation" – 3:29
5. "Breakup Song" – 4:08
6. "Fine Day" – 5:25
7. "Caroline" – 3:32
8. "The World" – 3:15
9. "Gearhead" – 3:24
10. "Flesh & Solitude" – 4:49
11. "The Comedown" – 5:57
12. "Soft to Touch" – 4:03

== Personnel ==
Narrow Head

- Jacob Duarte – guitars, lead vocals, synthesizers, production
- Ryan Chavez – bass guitar, production
- Will Menjivar – guitars, production
- Kora Puckett – guitars, vocals, synthesizers, production, front cover, design, layout
- Carson Wilcox – drums, drum machine programming, production

Additional personnel

- Will Borza – project assistance
- Matt Cerritos – additional engineering
- Sonny Diperri – engineering, mixing, production
- Madison East – front cover
- Jeff Friedl – tambourine on "The Real," "Moments of Clarity", "Sunday", and "Caroline"
- Mike Kriebel – additional engineering
- Lil Aaron – additional vocals on "Gearhead", additional production on "Soft to Touch"
- Howie Weinberg – mastering
