= Narrow Head =

American rock band

- Origin: Dallas, Texas, U.S.
- Genres: Alternative metal; grungegaze; shoegaze; post-hardcore; grunge
- Years active: 2013–present
- Label: Run for Cover
- Spinoffs: Nihilistic Easyrider; Bleed
- Members: Jacob Duarte; Kora Puckett; Carson Wilcox; Rubio Richie; Jake Cloud
- Past members: William Menjivar; Ryan Chavez; Ryan Hughes; Jay Chary; Keaton Khonsari; Ryan Seelig
- Website: www.narrow-head.com

Narrow Head is an American rock band formed in Dallas, Texas in 2013 by Houston native Jacob Duarte. Duarte, who serves as lead vocalist-guitarist and chief songwriter, relocated the band to Houston in 2015. Narrow Head have toured extensively, both nationally and internationally, and released three studio albums to date.

== History ==
In 2011, Dallas resident Ryan Hughes was intending to book his band a show in Houston. Through mutual friends in the hardcore punk scene, Hughes gained the contact for Jacob Duarte, guitarist for Houston emo band Chemistry. Together the pair formed Narrow Head, originally based in Dallas, in April 2013, with the founding lineup for Duarte on guitar and vocals, Hughes on guitar and vocals, Jay Chary on bass and Keaton Khonsari on drums. At the time of forming, its members had grown tired of the hardcore, instead intending for Narrow Head to be a fusion of emo and 1990s alternative rock such as My Bloody Valentine, Hum and Nirvana.

They released their debut demo tape on May 27 of that year, then played their first show in August, supporting California shoegaze band Whirr. In March 2014, they released their debut EP Far Removed. Later that year, Khonsari was replaced by Carson Wilcox. That year, they toured the United States supporting Prayer Chain. In 2015, Hughes departed the band, and the band instead became based in Houston.

On March 9, 2016, they released the single "Feels Like Sand". Which was released as of their debut album, Satisfaction on 14 March, 2016. By this time, the group's membership had coalesced into the trio of Duarte on vocals, William Menjivar on guitar and Wilcox on drums. For a brief time during the record of the album, they also included guitarist and bassist Ryan Seelig.

In 2018, the group released the single "Bulma" and did a tour of the western United States. At this time, Ryan Chavez became the band's bassist. Recommended to the label by Ben Cook, Narrow Head signed with Run For Cover Records in 2020 and released the singles "Night Tryst", "Stuttering Stanley, and "Hard to Swallow" in preparation for their sophomore album, 12th House Rock. Following the album's completion, long-time touring member Kora Puckett officially joined the band as guitarist. Run for Cover reissued Satisfaction in 2021 on vinyl.

On June 12, 2022, the band released the stand-alone single "T.W.I.N." through Run for Cover Records.

On November 7, 2022, the group released "Moments of Clarity" through Run for Cover Records as the debut single for their upcoming album Moments of Clarity. On December 13, 2022, another single from the album, entitled "Gearhead", was released. The album was released on February 10, 2023.

== Musical style and influences ==
Critics have categorised Narrow Head's music as alternative metal, grungegaze, shoegaze, post-hardcore and grunge.

The band has cited Seaweed, Jawbreaker, Slowdive, Failure, Sonic Youth, Dinosaur Jr., Nirvana, UGK, SSD, Sunny Day Real Estate, My Bloody Valentine, Swervedriver, Senses Fail, Armor for Sleep, Motion City Soundtrack, Helmet, Deftones, the Smashing Pumpkins, Hot Water Music, Tigers Jaw, Greg Sage, Alex G, Elliott Smith, Hum, Rival Schools, Alice in Chains, Big Star, the Carpenters, Blur, Boston, James Gang and Kim Coletta of Jawbox.

Narrow Head is one of the earliest bands to merge the emo revival outgrowth soft grunge with shoegaze, pioneering the grungegaze genre.

They have been cited as an influence by Split Chain.

== Members ==
Current members

- Jacob Duarte – lead vocals, guitar, synthesizer (2013–present)
- Carson Wilcox – drums, programming (2014–present)
- Kora Puckett – guitar, backing vocals, synthesizer (2019–present)
- Rubio Richie – guitar, bass (2023–present)
- Jake Cloud - bass (2024-present)

Former members

- Keaton Khonsari – drums (2013–2014)
- Ryan Hughes – guitars, backing and occasional lead vocals (2013–2016, 2021)
- Jay Chary – bass (2013–2015)
- Ryan Seelig – bass, guitar (2015-2017)
- Ryan Chavez – bass (2018–2022)
- William Menjivar – guitar, bass, backing vocals (2016–2024)

Timeline

== Discography ==
=== Studio albums ===
- Satisfaction (Floodlight, 2016)
- 12th House Rock (Run for Cover/Holyroar 2020)
- Moments of Clarity (Run for Cover, 2023)

=== EPs ===
- Demonstration MMXIII tape (Rarebear, 2013)
- Far Removed 12" (Floodlight, 2014)
- Fantastic Wow, 3 Singles and a Cover tape (Pharm House, 2016)
- The Spring Singles (self-released, 2017)
- Coursing Through tape (Advanced Perspective, 2019)

=== Other releases ===
- Summer 2014 Promotional Tape tape (Rare Bear, 2014)
- Live At Suite C tape (Run for Cover, 2025)

=== Singles ===
- "Where Are You Now?" tape (self-released, 2016)
- "Cool in Motion" (self-released, 2016)
- "Snoozy" (self-released, 2017)
- "Bulma" (VJ029, 2018)
- "Hard to Swallow" (Run for Cover, 2020)
- "Stuttering Stanley" (Run for Cover, 2020)
- "Night Tryst" (Run for Cover, 2020)
- "T.W.I.N." (Run for Cover, 2022)
- "Moments of Clarity" (Run for Cover, 2022)
- "Gearhead" (Run for Cover, 2022)
- "Caroline" (Run for Cover, 2023)
- "Sunday / Medicine" 7" split with Momma (Run for Cover/ Polyvinyl, 2023)
