= Basement discography =

- Studio albums: 5
- EPs: 5
- Singles: 12
- Music videos: 5

English rock band Basement has released five studio albums, five extended plays, twelve singles and five music videos.

== Studio albums ==
List of studio albums, with selected chart positions
Title	Album details	Peak chart positions			Sales
Title	Album details	UK	AUS	US	Sales
I Wish I Could Stay Here	Released: 5 July 2011; Label: Run for Cover (RFC:043); Format: CD, CS, DL, LP	—	—	—	
Colourmeinkindness	Released: 23 October 2012; Label: Run for Cover (RFC:061); Format: CD, CS, DL, LP	—	—	188	WW: 25,000+
Promise Everything	Released: 29 January 2016; Label: Run for Cover (RFC:143); Format: CD, CS, DL, LP	147	75	—	
Beside Myself	Released: 12 October 2018; Label: Fueled by Ramen; Format: CD, DL, LP	—	—	—	
Wired	Released: 8 May 2026; Label: Run for Cover; Format: CD, DL, LP	16	—	—	
"—" denotes releases that did not chart or were not released in that territory.

== Extended plays ==
List of extended plays
Title	EP details
Demo	Released: late 2009; Label: Self-released; Format: CD, DL
Songs About the Weather	Released: 17 May 2010; Label: City of Gold (COG003); Format: CS, DL, 7" vinyl
Two Songs	Released: 23 August 2010; Label: City of Gold; Format: CS
Further Sky	Released: 28 July 2014; Label: Run for Cover (RFC:108); Format: DL, 7" vinyl
Promise Everything	Released: 28 October 2015; Label: Run for Cover; Format: CS, 7" vinyl

== Singles ==
List of singles, showing year released and album name
Title	Year	Peak chart positions	Album
Title	Year	US Main.	Album
"Promise Everything"	2015	36	Promise Everything
"Oversized"	2015	—	Promise Everything
"Aquasun"	2016	—	Promise Everything
"Disconnect"	2018	—	Beside Myself
"Stigmata"	2018	—	Beside Myself
"Be Here Now"	2018	38	Beside Myself
"Are You the One"	2019	—	non-album singles
"Breathe (alt version)"	2022	—	non-album singles
"Wired"	2026	—	Wired
"Broken by Design"	2026	—	Wired
"The Way I Feel"	2026	—	Wired
"Head Alight"	2026	—	Wired

== Other appearances ==
Title	Year	Album
"Whole" (live at the BBC)	2012	Run for Cover Records Summer Sampler 2012
"School" (Nirvana cover)	2016	Doused in Mud, Soaked in Bleach

== Music videos ==
List of music videos, showing year released and director(s) name
Title	Year	Director
"Oversized"	2015	
"Aquasun"	2016	Alex Henery
"Promise Everything"	2017	Alex Henery
"Disconnect"	2018	Adam Powell
"Be Here Now"	2018	Mason Mercer

== See also ==
- List of songs recorded by Basement
