= Keep Driving (video game) =

2025 video game

- Developer: YCJY Games
- Publisher: YCJY Games
- Designers: Christopher Andreasson; Josef Martinovsky
- Programmer: Christopher Andreasson
- Artist: Josef Martinovsky
- Engine: GameMaker
- Platforms: Windows; Nintendo Switch; PlayStation 5; Xbox Series X/S
- Release: Windows; February 6, 2025; Switch, PS5, Xbox Series X/S; September 28, 2026
- Genre: Adventure
- Mode: Single-player

Keep Driving is a 2025 adventure video game developed and published by YCJY Games. The game blends the genres of RPG, adventure, and resource management sim, requiring players to take a road trip while picking up hitchhikers, working in odd jobs, surviving bad roads and other bad drivers, and more. The game was released for Windows in February 2025, and for the Nintendo Switch, PlayStation 5, and Xbox Series X/S in September 2026. Keep Driving received generally favorable reviews upon release and is one of the highest rated games of 2025.

== Plot ==
The unnamed protagonist driver has one of several background stories selected by the player, such as part-time mechanic or student. The driver has received a letter from a friend inviting him to a concert across the country. The driver needs to pick up a ticket to the concert festival and, if they want, a tent to use while there. The driver drives their car—selecting from vehicles like an early 1980s sedan or a pickup truck—away from home and onto the first stop on the map.

Players in Keep Driving travel from location to location over a variety of road times and biomes with randomized events to navigate.

Between stops, the driver must navigate a challenging road trip, including items in the roadway like an abandoned car, road kill, or birds; having an angry bee in the car; slow cars; and aggressive police officers. These challenges can delay the driver from getting to the concert on time by breaking the car or taking away from precious resources. The driver may also encounter hitchhikers who hope that the driver will help them out in some way. For example, a lost child is looking for her parents, and the driver must now consider taking her home. If the driver chooses to help the hitchhiker, the hitchhiker could be useful in dealing with the road trip's challenges.

Along the way, the driver's goals may change. For example, instead of going to the concert, the driver may choose to inherit some property from a recently deceased relative or participate in a drag race. There are at least 9 different endings to Keep Driving depending on the driver's choices.

== Gameplay ==
The road trip primarily takes place with a side-view of the car moving between destinations and a dashboard with actions the driver can take. When a challenge during the road trip arises, a series of colored icons appear on the dashboard. The driver must eliminate all of the icons in order to advance past the challenge. The driver does so by matching the icons with icons from skills and items with the icons given by the challenge.

When players are faced with an event in Keep Driving, they must use skills and items to eliminate the threat.

The driver can have up to five skills, which are unlocked through choices made during the trip, and four items, which are placed in the glovebox. Hitchhikers can add additional skills. Most skills and items have limited uses that can be replenished by resting or by purchasing more items at towns. Additional items can be placed in the trunk, to be retrieved outside of battle.

If the driver is unsuccessful in removing all of the icons in a turn, the driver will face consequences such as fatigue or damage to the car. If the driver becomes fully fatigued or the car completely damaged, the driver may have to stop and rest on the side of the road or have the car towed to a nearby garage for fixing. These outcomes stress the driver's finances and ability to get to objectives on time.

In towns or other points on the map, the driver may choose from a variety of tasks depending on the location. Many locations have gas stations to fill up the tank and stores from which to buy additional items for use in road challenges and to upgrade the vehicle. The towns can have employment offices which allow the driver to earn money in exchange for time, and they can have garages which allow for upgrading the vehicle. Some towns have places to sleep that provide more benefits than sleeping in the car.

== Development ==
The Gothenburg-based video game developer YCJY Games—consisting of Christopher Andreasson and Josef Martinovsky—began developing Keep Driving in 2016, shortly after the release of The Aquatic Adventure of the Last Human. They considered it a spiritual sequel to their first game, Keep Walking EP, and felt it was their "big thing" with which they had more personal attachment. Development was halted after a year due to a lack of funds and experience, opting instead to work on smaller games like Sea Salt (2019). Full-time development resumed in 2020 after the release of Post Void. They felt their experience developing other games left them more prepared; like with Post Void, they planned the full game in advance to avoid repeating mistakes. The game was funded by Creative Europe Media and Kowloon Nights, and uses the game engine GameMaker.

The game was originally structured with several gameplay systems and minigames like The Oregon Trail, but the developers found it complicated and felt its direction lacked focus, prompting several redesigns. They created it as a tabletop game in two weeks to understand the mechanics before approaching it from the role-playing perspective, settling on a genre more akin to a roguelike. Mechanically, the game is inspired by Diablo. Earlier iterations featured more sophisticated car controls but the developers found a simplified approach more rewarding, especially after gameplay interruptions. They had concerns about the game's lengthy quiet periods but found they "just had to be confident about it, and keep it in". The early-2000s time period was chosen due to the lack of smartphones and consequently the complexities of navigation. Martinovsky found the concept reminiscent of his childhood spent playing games with friends.

The developers took inspiration from games like FTL: Faster Than Light (2012), Jalopy (2018), and Oregon Trail II (1995), board games like The 7th Continent and Gloomhaven (both 2017), and road movies like Paris, Texas (1984) and Two-Lane Blacktop (1971). Keep Driving's art style was modelled on Gothenburg and its surroundings, with some later areas inspired by Martinovsky's experience living in Los Angeles. He found the art style more realistic and grounded than his previous work. The backgrounds have around eight or nine parallax layers.

=== Soundtrack ===
The game features more than 50 songs. The developers wanted to ensure it featured "smaller bands" like those from Gothenburg's indie rock scene, with which they had several connections. Martinovsky described the music as "a very skate-punk early-2000s feeling".

While driving, the player can queue up to 6 songs from the game's soundtrack using songs that the driver starts with or purchases along the way. The songs chosen for Keep Driving were coordinated by Karl Robb Kaardal, a Swedish pizza restauranteur. The local Swedish rock bands that contributed to the soundtrack for the game include Westkust, Mundane, The Honeydrips, Crystal Boys, Dorena, Aasma, Zimmer Grandioso, Makthaverskan, Holy Now, and El Huervo. Music was also contributed by the Y/CJ/Y team under Martinovsky's own name and by My darling YOU!, the latter of which is Johansson's music project. Several of the musicians featured in Keep Driving were also featured in the Swedish game Hotline Miami, including Fucking Werewolf Asso, which is Hotline Miami artist Dennis Wedin's band.

== Release ==
YCJY Games announced Keep Driving's existence on Twitter in July 2016. The game was showcased at Gamescom in August 2024. It was formally announced on October 2, 2024, with its first trailer, featuring music by Swedish rock band Westkust. The game was showcased with a demo as part of Steam Next Fest in October. The demo remained on Steam after the event; it received over 70,000 downloads and led to over 170,000 users adding the game to their wishlist. In January 2025, YCJY Games announced the February 6 release date for Windows, alongside a new trailer featuring music by the Swedish band Holy Now. The game was released for the Nintendo Switch, PlayStation 5, and Xbox Series X/S on September 28, 2026.

== Reception ==
Reception

Aggregate scores
Aggregator	Score
Metacritic	84/100
OpenCritic	90% recommend

Review scores
Publication	Score
Hardcore Gamer	4.5/5
PC Gamer (US)	90/100
RPGamer	3.5/5
The Games Machine (Italy)	8.5/10
Digital Spy	4/5
Game Rant	10/10
Gamereactor	7/10
Rock Paper Shotgun	Bestest Best
Vandal	8.5/10

Keep Driving received "generally favorable" reviews from critics, according to review aggregator website Metacritic, and 90% of critics recommended the game according to OpenCritic.

Hardcore Gamer praised the story of Keep Driving, saying that it "captures the vibes of a good old-fashioned road trip, but also serves as a beautiful portrait of the human spirit, following our main character as they grapple with coming of age, entering the real world and finding their purpose" and compared the game favorably to other games with artistic storytelling like Disco Elysium and Road 96. PC Gamer specifically praised the way the hitchhiking characters were developed, writing that "with minimal text, their stories and personalities come through, and by the end of the trip, it's clear we're all crammed into this car for the same reason: because we're all a little damaged, a little aimless, a little adrift." Polygon's take on the hitchhikers was that Keep Driving "delivered a master class in economical characterization and storytelling through game design."

Particular praise was garnered for the soundtrack. PC Gamer said that despite never having heard of any of the Swedish bands in the soundtrack, "their tracks will be part of my next real roadtrip." RPGamer called the soundtrack "a treat for the ears" and noted that "all good road trips start with an amazing soundtrack, and Y/CJ/Y Games and Westkust nailed this part of the assignment."

The gameplay was less well received. Of the turn-based combat system, Polygon noted "there's a big conceptual gap between it and the action being described by the game." RPGamer called the battle system "simple" and "servicable". Several reviewers found the aesthetic of the game to be great, but the gameplay loop itself as repetitive, monotonous, and boring.

Keep Driving won the Grand Jury Award at IndieCade in 2024 and was nominated for Best Self Published Indie Game at the Golden Joystick Awards and Chumley's Speakeasy Award for Best Hidden Gem at the New York Game Awards in 2025.
