= Promise Everything =

Studio album by Basement
- Released: 29 January 2016
- Recorded: April 2015
- Studio: Assault and Battery 2, England
- Genre: Soft grunge
- Length: 28:38
- Label: Run for Cover
- Producer: Sam Pura

Basement chronology
Further Sky (2014)	Promise Everything (2016)	Beside Myself (2018)

Singles from Promise Everything
- 1. "Promise Everything" Released: 28 October 2015; 2. "Oversized" Released: 10 December 2015; 3. "Aquasun" Released: 14 January 2016

Promise Everything is the third studio album by British rock band Basement. The band began recording with producer Sam Pura in April 2015. The album was released on 29 January 2016 through Run for Cover.

== Background ==
Professional ratings
Aggregate scores
Source	Rating
Metacritic	75/100
Review scores
Source	Rating
AllMusic	4/5 stars
Clash	7/10
DIY	4/5 stars
Exclaim!	9/10
Pitchfork	5.0/10
Rolling Stone Australia	4.5/5 stars
Sputnikmusic	2.9/5
The Line of Best Fit	9/10
Upset	5/5 stars

Before the release of their second album Colourmeinkindness (2012), Basement announced a hiatus because of personal commitments. Guitarist Alex Henery later revealed it was due to vocalist Andrew Fisher wishing to become a certified teacher which required him to return to school for a period of a year and a half. Drummer James Fisher, Andrew's younger brother, was graduating from art school, and the rest of the members were working on their respective careers. Henery, meanwhile, was working as a videographer in Boston, Massachusetts for record label Run for Cover. In late January 2014, the group announced that they would be returning from their hiatus and would perform shows during the summer. The band recorded an EP, Further Sky, in secret before releasing it in July.

== Production ==
In August 2014, Henery revealed the group was writing material for a new album. Although Henery was located in the US and the rest of the band was in the UK, they would send each other ideas. The group managed to have a few practice sessions before composing the album. Henery found it "a little tough", but the group managed to "[make] it work". In early April 2015, the band posted they had begun recording with producer Sam Pura. Recording took place at Assault and Battery 2 in England, while mixing would later be done by Pura at the Panda Studios in California. Brian Gardener mastered the recordings. The album's sound has been described as alternative rock, compared to American bands such as Jimmy Eat World, Failure, and Soundgarden. Henery later named American band Autolux as "the biggest influence" on the record as "they just had energy and had that distortion, but still had really cool melodies."

== Release ==
On 19 October 2015, Basement's third album, Promise Everything, was announced for release and the artwork was revealed, which was done by R.V. On 28 October, "Promise Everything" was made available for streaming and was released as a single. In October and November, the band supported the Story So Far. On 10 December, "Oversized" was released as a single and a music video was released for it. A music video was released for "Aquasun" on 14 January 2016, which was directed by Henery. The song was released as a single on the same day, and released to American radio a week later. The album was made available for streaming on 22 January and was released through Run for Cover on 29 January. (Note: US Run for Cover RFC:143) In February and March, the band went on a UK and Europe tour. The tour, which featured Tigers Jaw and Alex G as support acts, was the band's biggest tour so far.

In April and May, the band went to on a US tour with support from Turnstile, Defeater and Colleen Green. Following this, the band went on tour in Australia with support from Turnover and Break Even. The band toured the UK in July with support from Dinosaur Pile-Up and The Sun Days. In October and November, the band supported Bring Me the Horizon on their UK arena tour. In February and March 2017, the band went on a UK tour with support from Higher Power. A deluxe edition of the album was released on March 3 through Fueled by Ramen. The band supported Thursday on their reunion tour in the US throughout March and April. On 12 April, a music video was released for the new version of "Promise Everything". In June, the band performed at the Download Festival. In December, the band supported Frank Carter & The Rattlesnakes on their headlining UK tour. The title track was made available as DLC in the video game Rock Band 4

== Track listing ==
No.	Title	Length
1.	"Brothers Keeper"	3:07
2.	"Hanging Around"	2:59
3.	"Lose Your Grip"	2:46
4.	"Aquasun"	3:42
5.	"Submission"	2:23
6.	"Oversized"	2:38
7.	"Blinded Bye"	2:38
8.	"For You the Moon"	3:14
9.	"Promise Everything"	2:37
10.	"Halo"	2:30
Total length:		28:38

Deluxe edition bonus tracks
No.	Title	Length
11.	"My Favourite Game (The Cardigans cover)"	3:39
12.	"Aquasun (acoustic)"	3:10
13.	"Blinded Bye (acoustic)"	2:18
14.	"Cloud"	1:10
Total length:		38:00

== Personnel ==
Personnel per booklet.

Basement

- Ronan Crix – guitar
- Andrew Fisher – vocals
- James Fisher – drums
- Alex Henery – guitar
- Duncan Stewart – bass

Production

- Sam Pura – producer, engineer, mixing
- Brian Gardener – mastering
- R.V. – artwork
- Mitch Pinney – photography
- Alex Henery – layout

== Chart performance ==
Chart (2016)	Peak position
Australian Albums (ARIA)	75
UK Albums (OCC)	147
US Billboard Alternative Albums	15
US Billboard Heatseekers Albums	1
US Billboard Independent Albums	6
US Billboard Top Rock Albums	19
US Billboard Top Album Sales	96
US Billboard Vinyl Albums	3
