= Please Remain Calm =

Studio album by Hostage Calm
- Released: (United States) October 9, 2012
- Recorded: 2012 at The Magpie Cage in Baltimore, Maryland
- Genre: Punk rock; heartland rock; emo
- Length: 34:02
- Label: Run For Cover Records
- Producer: J. Robbins, Hostage Calm

Hostage Calm chronology
Hostage Calm (2010)	Please Remain Calm (2012)	Hostage Calm/Anti-Flag (2013)

Singles from Please Remain Calm
- 1. "Brokenheartland" Released: August 28, 2012

Professional ratings
Review scores
Source	Rating
Absolute Punk	95%
Alternative Press	4.5/5 stars
Alter the Press	5/5 stars
Punknews.org	4/5 stars
Rock Sound	8/10 stars
Sputnikmusic	4.5/5 stars

Please Remain Calm is the third studio album by Wallingford, Connecticut based rock band Hostage Calm. On August 28, 2012, the band released the single, "Brokenheartland." Released in October 2012, Please Remain Calm garnered wide critical acclaim and praise. Following this, the band supported Rival Schools on their headlining US tour. In September and October 2013, the band supported Saves the Day on their headlining US tour.

== Track listing ==
All music is composed by Hostage Calm

No.	Title	Length
1.	"On Both Eyes"	3:42
2.	"Don't Die On Me Now"	2:26
3.	"Brokenheartland"	2:56
4.	"Woke Up Next To A Body"	3:18
5.	"Impossible!"	2:58
6.	"May Love Prevail"	2:13
7.	"The "M" Word"	3:48
8.	"Patriot"	3:49
9.	"Closing Remarks"	3:29
10.	"One Last Salute"	5:30
Total length:		34:02

== Personnel ==
=== Hostage Calm ===
- Tom Chiari - Lead Guitar
- Tim Casey - Bass, Vocals
- Chris Martin - Lead Vocals, Guitars, Piano
- Nick Balzano - Guitar, Backing Vocals
- John Ross - Drums

=== Additional Personnel ===
- Ev Wivell - Artwork, Design
- Dan Coutant - Mastering
- Jamie Moore - Photography
- Chris Brooks - Piano, Keyboards, Organ
- Hostage Calm - Producer, Music, Lyrics (tracks: 1 to 3, 5 to 10)
- J. Robbins - Producer, Recording, Mixing
- Gordon Withers - Cello (track 6)
- Ron Rolling - Trumpet (track 6)
- Katie Lynch - Violin (track 6)
- Greg Moran - Vocals, Lyrics (track 4)
- Justin Fogleman - Additional Production (track 8)
