= Pronoun (disambiguation) =

Pronouns are a class of words.

Pronoun may also refer to:

- Pronoun (publishing platform), a New York-based company
- Pronoun (musician), an American singer-songwriter
- Pronoun game, an act of concealing sexual orientation
- Pronoun dropping (pro-drop) language, a language in which pronoun classes are omitted
- Preferred gender pronoun chosen by the individual
