= Die on Stage =

Studio album by Hostage Calm
- Released: (United States) September 16, 2014
- Recorded: January 2014 at Studio 4 Recording in Conshohocken, Pennsylvania
- Genres: Power pop, pop punk
- Length: 32:34
- Labels: Run For Cover Records; Lost Tape Collective
- Producer: Will Yip

Hostage Calm chronology
Hostage Calm/Anti-Flag (2013)	Die on Stage (2014)

Singles from Die On Stage
- 1. "Your Head/Your Heart" Released: July 22, 2014; 2. "A Thousand Miles Away From Here" Released: August 18, 2014; 3. "Fallen Angel" Released: September 2, 2014

Professional ratings
Review scores
Source	Rating
Punknews.org	3.5/5 stars

Die on Stage is the fourth and final studio album from Connecticut rock band Hostage Calm. The album was released on September 16, 2014, through Run For Cover Records. On July 22, 2014, the band released a music video for the single, "Your Head/Your Heart." The record was produced by Will Yip of Studio 4. This album will mark the first release with new drummer Keith Sidorowicz, who joined the band in 2013 following the departure of the band's former drummer, John Ross. On August 18, 2014, the band released the album's second single, "A Thousand Miles Away From Here." On September 2, 2014, the band premiered the album's third single, "Fallen Angel," courtesy of Fuse. The album was included at number 35 on Rock Sound's "Top 50 Albums of the Year" list.

== Track listing ==
All music is composed by Hostage Calm.

No.	Title	Length
1.	"When You Know"	2:56
2.	"A Thousand Miles Away From Here"	2:06
3.	"Love Against!"	4:17
4.	"Someone Else"	3:27
5.	"Fallen Angel"	3:23
6.	"Your Head/Your Heart"	3:23
7.	"Raised"	3:22
8.	"12/31"	3:18
9.	"Darling You"	2:43
10.	"Past Ideas Of The Future"	3:59
Total length:		32:34

== Personnel ==
Hostage Calm

- Tom Chiari - Lead Guitar
- Tim Casey - Bass, Vocals
- Chris Martin - Lead Vocals, Guitars, Piano
- Nick Balzano - Guitar, Backing Vocals
- Keith Sidorowicz - Drums
