= Ill (album) =

Studio album by Makthaverskan
- Released: 20 October 2017
- Length: 37:05
- Label: Luxury (Sweden), Run for Cover

Makthaverskan chronology
Makthaverskan II (2013)	Ill (2017)

Professional ratings
Aggregate scores
Source	Rating
Metacritic	79/100
Review scores
Source	Rating
AllMusic	4/5 stars
No Ripcord	7/10
Pitchfork	7.6/10
The Skinny	3/5 stars

Ill is the third studio album by Swedish post punk band Makthaverskan. It was released on 20 October 2017 through Luxury Recordings in Sweden and Run for Cover Records everywhere else.

== Track listing ==
No.	Title	Length
1.	"Vienna"	3:23
2.	"Leda"	3:30
3.	"In My Dreams"	3:10
4.	"Witness"	3:03
5.	"To Say It as It Is"	3:26
6.	"Eden"	4:27
7.	"Siren"	3:28
8.	"Front"	3:48
9.	"Comfort"	3:28
10.	"Days Turn into Years"	5:22
