= Imposter Syndrome =

Impostor syndrome is the psychological pattern of doubting one's accomplishments and fearing being exposed as a "fraud".

Imposter Syndrome may refer to:

- Capgras delusion, a disorder in which a person believes another has been replaced by an identical impostor.
- Impostor Syndrome, a 2017 song by Sidney Gish for the album No Dogs Allowed
- Imposter Syndrome, a 2019 EP by Gracey
- Imposter Syndrome, a 2020 EP by Outline in Color
- "Imposter Syndrome", a 2022 song by Sampa the Great from As Above, So Below
- "Imposter Syndrome" (Shrinking), a 2023 television episode
- "Impostor Syndrome", an episode of the TV series Among Us
