= Keep Driving =

Keep Driving may refer to:

- "Keep Driving", a song by Harry Styles from his 2022 album Harry's House
- "Keep Driving", a song by Meat Loaf from his 1983 album Midnight at the Lost and Found
- Keep Driving (video game), a 2025 video game
