= Be Here Now =

Be Here Now may refer to:

- Be Here Now (book), a 1971 book on spirituality by Ram Dass
- Be Here Now, a 2015 documentary film about actor Andy Whitfield having cancer
- Be Here Now, a 2017 dance work choreographed by Trey McIntyre

== Albums ==
- Be Here Now (album) or the title song, by Oasis, 1997
- Be Here Now, by the Mynabirds, 2017
- Be Here Now, by Suzanne Little, 1995
- Be Here Now: Solo Live, by Steve Forbert, 1994

== Songs ==
- "Be Here Now" (Basement song), 2018
- "Be Here Now" (George Harrison song), 1973
- "Be Here Now", by As Tall as Lions from As Tall as Lions, 2006
- "Be Here Now", by Hybrid from the Driveclub video game soundtrack, 2014
- "Be Here Now", by Loop from A Gilded Eternity, 1990
- "Be Here Now", by Mason Jennings from Boneclouds, 2006
- "Be Here Now", by Ray LaMontagne from Till the Sun Turns Black, 2006
- "Be Here Now", by Thessalonians from Soulcraft, 1993

== See also ==
- Here Now (disambiguation)
