= Hostage Calm / Anti-Flag =

Hostage Calm/Anti-Flag

EP by Hostage Calm & Anti-Flag
- Released: February 26, 2013
- Genre: Pop punk, punk rock
- Length: 5:12
- Label: Run For Cover Records, A-F Records
- Producer: Greg Thomas (Hostage Calm), Justin Francis (Anti-Flag)

Hostage Calm chronology
Please Remain Calm (2012)	Hostage Calm/Anti-Flag (2013)	Die On Stage (2014)

Anti-Flag chronology
The General Strike (2012)	Hostage Calm/Anti-Flag (2013)

Hostage Calm/Anti-Flag is a split EP between American punk rock bands Hostage Calm and Anti-Flag. The EP was released on February 26, 2013 through Run For Cover Records and A-F Records. This release marked the last appearance by drummer John Ross who left the band in April 2013.

== Track listing ==
All music is composed by Hostage Calm and Anti-Flag.

No.	Title	Length
1.	"Olly Olly Oxen Free" (Hostage Calm)	3:26
2.	"Branded Rebellion" (Anti-Flag)	2:30
Total length:		5:12

== Personnel ==
Hostage Calm

- Tom Chiari - Lead Guitar
- Tim Casey - Bass, Vocals
- Chris Martin - Lead Vocals, Guitars, Piano
- Nick Balzano - Guitar, Backing Vocals
- John Ross - Drums

Anti-Flag

- Justin Sane – Guitar, Vocals
- Chris #2 – Bass, Vocals
- Chris Head – Guitar, Vocals
- Pat Thetic – Drums

Additional Personnel

- Chris Teti - Engineer, Mixing (track 1)
- Greg Thomas - Engineer, Mixing (track 1)
- Mass Giorgini - Mastering (track 2)
- Justin Francis - Mixing (track 2)
- Dan Coutant - Mastering (track 1)
- Adam Vass - Artwork
