= Further Sky =

Extended play by Basement

EP by Basement
- Released: 28 July 2014
- Recorded: Early 2014
- Studio: Livingston Studio 1, London
- Genre: Alternative rock
- Length: 10:51
- Label: Run for Cover
- Producer: Dan Goudie

Basement chronology
Colourmeinkindness (2012)	Further Sky (2014)	Promise Everything (2016)

Further Sky is an EP by English rock band Basement. The band went on hiatus in July 2012, prior to the release of their second album Colourmeinkindness in October 2012. They began practicing again around Christmas 2013, composing the song "Jet". Whilst guitarist Alex Henery was in the United States, the rest of the band wrote another song, "Summer's Colour". In late January 2014, they announced the end of their musical hiatus. Along with a cover of the Suede song "Animal Nitrate", the group recorded the aforementioned original songs in early 2014. Recording was done in secret at Livingston Studio 1 in London, with producer Dan Goudie.

On 28 July 2014, the Further Sky EP was released through Run for Cover Records, and was available for streaming three days prior. Categorized as an alternative rock EP, it was met with a positive reception, with several of the music critics complimenting the change in sound and praising Andrew Fisher's vocals. Following this, the band toured Australia, Japan, America and the United Kingdom, which included playing as a support act for Brand New.

== Background ==
Before the release of their second album Colourmeinkindness (2012), Basement announced a hiatus due to personal commitments. In 2014, guitarist Alex Henery revealed it was because vocalist Andrew Fisher wishing to become a certified teacher which required him to return to school for a period of a year and a half. Drummer James Fisher, Fisher's younger brother, was graduating from art school, and the rest of the members were working on their respective careers. Henery, meanwhile, was working as a videographer in Boston, Massachusetts for the record label Run for Cover Records.

In late January 2014, the group announced that they would be returning from their hiatus and would perform shows during the summer. The band thought the hiatus would be lengthy while they focused on their professional lives, but were "glad that this is not the case".

== Composition and recording ==
Basement practiced together when Henery was at home for Christmas in 2013. The practice was initially "just [...] for fun". Although the band had ideas, composing material was accidental according to Henery. A rough outline of "Jet" was a result of this practice session. Content with the song, the band recorded the rough outline of it with an iPhone. While Henery was residing in the US, the rest of the band had composed "Summer's Colour" in the UK. The other song on the EP is a cover of Suede's 1993 song "Animal Nitrate". The EP's sound has been described as alternative rock, and rock, with influences from shoegaze and Britpop. Henery considered the material "slightly more melodic" combined with "a stronger pop sensibility", but not far from Colourmeinkindness.

Further Sky was recorded in three days, over the course of one weekend, in early 2014. Henery flew to the UK for the recording. Run for Cover told the band they could record wherever they wished. Recording took place in London at Livingston Studio 1. The band called it "an incredible experience" tracking at "such a prestigious" studio. The group was working with Dan Goudie, and, although they had not met him previously, they worked well together. Basement kept the recording secret. Henery called the whole process stress-free and enjoyable. Sam Pura mixed the tracks, while Piper Payne mastered them.

== Release ==
On 16 June 2014, Further Sky was announced as the band's next project to be released and the track "Summer's Colour" was made available for streaming. On 7 July, the group released a video of themselves recording the EP. On 25 July, Further Sky was made available for streaming and was released three days later through Run for Cover Records. (Note: US Run for Cover RFC:108) All of the songs were later included as bonus tracks on the Japanese edition of Colourmeinkindness. Basement toured between 26 July and 20 August in Australia, Japan, and sold out American venues. The latter then played a trio of shows in London, Leeds and Manchester in the UK in late October with Cloakroom and Newmoon as the opening act. In May 2015, the band performed at the Groezrock festival. In July and August, the band toured the US alongside Better Off, Whirr, and LVL UP. In September, the group supported Brand New on their tour of the UK.

== Reception ==
Professional ratings
Review scores
Source	Rating
AbsolutePunk	9.9/10
PopMatters	7/10 stars
Punknews.org	3.5/5 stars
Sputnikmusic	3.5/5

Further Sky was met with received positive reviews music critics. AbsolutePunk staff member Aj LaGambina considered the release "easily digestible" and praised its "cohesiveness". He thought the songs were composed well, despite the short recording time-frame. LaGambina described the production as "well balanced" and praised Fisher's vocals as "com[ing] a very long way" from the band's first album, I Wish I Could Stay Here (2011). The only criticism the reviewer appointed to the EP was the percussion which sounded "a bit cymbal heavy." Alternative Press contributor Brian Kraus wrote that the band stuck with the alternative rock sound that they had used on Colourmekindness for this EP. He described Fisher's vocals as "stretch[ing] across the canvas", and not too dissimilar to those of the members of Swervedriver. Kraus considered "Animal Nitrate" the "most sprawling song" of the set.

Zachary Houle of PopMatters thought the EP was "bright and punchy, and really anthemic" with "not a bad track in the bunch." Punknews.org reviewer RENALDO69 noted that the "heavy tones" of the band's previous work "are highly absent" on the EP but that it still contained the "same contemplative feel and introspective touches" that made the band lovable. He summarised the release as "upbeat", dropping the "complex melodies of old and gone" for material that is "more minimal, yet effective." After two plays, he thought it was reminiscent of Citizen and Sainthood Reps. Sputnikmusic staff member Dan H. called the change in sound to alternative rock as "suit[ing] the band well", noting that Fisher had "adopted a surprisingly approachable tone" with "a softer, more pronounced (vocal) delivery."

== Track listing ==
All music written by Basement, except where noted.

1. "Summer's Colour" – 3:35
2. "Jet" – 3:26
3. "Animal Nitrate" (Brett Anderson, Bernard Butler) – 4:00

== Personnel ==
Personnel per sleeve.

Basement

- Ronan Crix – guitar
- Andrew Fisher – vocals
- James Fisher – drums
- Alex Henery – guitar
- Duncan Stewart – bass

Production

- Dan Goudie – producer
- Sam Pura – mixing
- Piper Payne – mastering

== Sources ==
- Biddulph, Andy (February 2016). McLaughlin, David (ed.). "Reviews". Rock Sound (209). London: Freeway Press Inc. ISSN 1465-0185.
