= Hostage Calm (album) =

Studio album by Hostage Calm
- Released: (United States) 20 July 2010
- Recorded: 2010 at Silver Bullet Studios in Burlington, Connecticut
- Genre: Punk rock, indie rock
- Length: 34:14
- Label: Run For Cover Records
- Producer: Greg Thomas, Hostage Calm

Hostage Calm chronology
Lens (2008)	Hostage Calm (2010)	Hostage Calm UK Sampler (2010)

Singles from Hostage Calm
- 1. "Rebel Fatigues" Released: October 12, 2011

Hostage Calm is the second studio album by Connecticut rock band Hostage Calm. It was recorded at Silver Bullet Studios in Burlington, Connecticut and produced by Greg Thomas. This album is the last release to feature drummer Brett Pieper and first to feature guitarist Nick Balzano. On October 12, 2011, a music video was released for the single, "Rebel Fatigues." In December 2011, the band embarked on a UK tour with I Am the Avalanche.

== Track listing ==
All music is composed by Hostage Calm.

No.	Title	Length
1.	"A Mistrust Earned"	1:33
2.	"Rebel Fatigues"	2:55
3.	"Affidavit"	2:04
4.	"Where the Waters Call Home"	3:41
5.	"Ballots/Stones"	2:29
6.	"Marine Trangressions"	3:11
7.	"Young Professionals"	3:01
8.	"Overstayed"	3:07
9.	"Wither on the Vine"	3:09
10.	"Victory Lap"	3:10
11.	"Jerry Rumspringer"	2:53
12.	"War on a Feeling"	3:01
Total length:		34:14

== Personnel ==
Hostage Calm

- Tom Chiari – lead guitar
- Tim Casey – bass, vocals
- Chris Martin – lead vocals, guitars, piano
- Nick Balzano – guitar, backing vocals
- Brett Pieper – drums

Additional personnel

- Alan Huck – artwork, layout
- Jeff Casazza – artwork, layout
- Dave Swanson – engineer
- Alan Douches – mastering
- Ross Caplet – organ, piano
- Greg Thomas – producer, engineer
- Greg Moran – vocals (track 10)
- Chris Zizzamia – baritone saxophone (track 7)
- Ed Goodriend – trombone (track 7)
- Hostage Calm – producer, engineer, artwork, layout
