= OMG I MADE IT =

EP by Pronoun
- Released: June 11, 2021
- Genres: Alternative, indie rock, indie pop
- Length: 18:07
- Labels: Wax Bodega, Sleep Well Records
- Producer: pronoun

Pronoun chronology
I'll Show You Stronger (2019)	OMG I MADE IT (2021)

OMG I MADE IT (stylized in upper-case) is the second EP released by the American musician pronoun (aka Alyse Vellturo).

== Content ==
The five track EP was released on vinyl, digital download, and on streaming services on 11 June 2021. Like her previous EP and album, OMG I MADE IT was recorded in Vellturo's Brooklyn, NY apartment. Vellturo describes the album as "a five song memoir from a 33 y/o queer business woman navigating her way through mental health and anxiety." The first two singles, I WANNA DIE BUT I CAN'T (CUZ I GOTTA KEEP LIVING) and I'M RIGHT BACK IN IT were written sometime in late 2019 before the 2020 pandemic. The remaining songs were written after the pandemic started, but were not directly related to what was happening. Vellturo realized the album was finished once she wrote WASTING TIME and realized it was the last song.

The song I WANNA DIE BUT I CAN'T (CUZ I GOTTA KEEP LIVING) was written after a bad day at work. On the song, Vellturo says:

But I think I was literally just sitting at work and I was like, I was just having a really bad day. And I was like ‘I don’t feel like existing anymore.’ I feel like I find myself thinking that a lot, but in a weird way where I’m like, ‘I don’t want to do this.’ And It’s like, ‘well, you kind of have to.’ Or, like ‘you could not,’ but it’s like ‘I don’t think you’re going to not.’ So it’s like, ‘well, I guess we’re just going to have to figure it out.’

== Reception ==
The lead single, ″I WANNA DIE BUT I CAN’T (CUZ I GOTTA KEEP LIVING)″ received positive press from Stereogum, MTV, and Billboard, where it landed the 44th spot in their June article ″The 50 Best Songs of 2021 So Far: Staff Picks″ and 98th on Billboard's top 100 songs of 2021 where it was described "as both a scream-along anthem about stunted emotional growth, and proof as to why Pronoun leader Alyse Vellturo needs to be playing bigger stages"

== Track listing ==
No.	Title	Length
1.	"SOUND THE ALARMS!!!1!"	3:01
2.	"I'M RIGHT BACK IN IT"	4:02
3.	"I WANNA DIE BUT I CAN'T (CUZ I GOTTA KEEP LIVING)"	2:50
4.	"HALF OF THE TIME"	3:59
5.	"WASTING TIME"	4:13
Total length:		18:07

Note

- All tracks are stylized in upper-case. Spelling mistake on SOUND THE ALARMS!!!1! is intentional
