= Here Now =

Here Now may refer to:

- "Here Now", a 1991 song from Paul McCartney's Liverpool Oratorio
- Here Now (film), a 2024 film by Gabriele Muccino

== See also ==
- Be Here Now (disambiguation)
- Here and Now (disambiguation)
