= The Berries =

- Genres: Rock
- Years active: 2018-present

The Berries are an American rock band signed to Run for Cover Records. The band consists of members of the bands Happy Diving and Big Bite. On October 26, 2018, The Berries released their first album titled Start All Over Again. The group issued their second album, Berryland, in 2019. In August 2022, High Flying Man was released as the ensemble's third album.

== Discography ==
=== Studio albums ===
- Start All Over Again (Run for Cover, 2018)
- Berryland (Run for Cover, 2019)
- High Flying Man (Run for Cover, 2022)
- The Berries (2025)
