= Here and Now =

Here and Now is a phrase that can refer to one's experience of the present moment. It may also refer to:

== Music ==
- Here & Now (band), an English progressive/space rock band
- Here and Now Tour, a series of concert tours

=== Albums ===
- Hear & Now (Shirelles album), 1965
- Hear and Now (album), a 1975 album by the Butts Band
- Hear & Now (Don Cherry album) (1976)
- Hear & Now (Billy Squier album) (1989)
- Here and Now (The Jazztet album) (1962)
- Here and Now (Hampton Hawes album) (1965)
- Here & Now!, a 1965 album by George Shearing
- Here & Now (Jean Shepard album), 1971
- Here and Now (Tchukon album), a 1987 album by Tchukon
- Here and Now (The Wilkinsons album) (2000)
- Here and Now (Ike Turner album) (2001)
- Here & Now: The Best of Human Nature (2001)
- Here & Now (Pop Shuvit album), 2005 album by Malaysian band, Pop Shuvit
- Here & Now (America album) (2007)
- The Here and Now, a 2011 album by Architects
- Here & Now, an album by The Idea of North
- Here and Now (Charlie Major album)
- Here and Now (Nickelback album)
- Here and Now (Sky Cries Mary album), an album by Sky Cries Mary
- Here and Now, an album by Worlds Apart
- Here and Now (Darryl Worley album)
- Here and Now, an album by Jose Mari Chan, or its title song
- Here and Now, an album by Joe Dolan
- hERE aND nOW, an album by Peter Holsapple and Chris Stamey
- Here and Now (Kenny Chesney album) (2020)

=== EPs ===
- Here and Now (Gretta Ray EP) (2018)

=== Songs ===
- "Here and Now" (Luther Vandross song) (1989)
- "Here and Now" (Kenny Chesney song)
- "Here and Now" (Seether song)
- "Here and Now" / "You'll Be Sorry", a 2001 song by Steps
- "Here and Now", a song by Client from Client
- "Here and Now", a song by The Ernies from Meson Ray
- "Here and Now", a song by Great Big Sea from Fortune's Favour
- "Here and Now", a song by Hed PE from New World Orphans
- "Here & Now", a song by Letters to Cleo from Aurora Gory Alice
- "Here and Now", a song by Ride from Nowhere
- "Here and Now", a song by Staind from Confessions of the Fallen
- "Here and Now", a song by ZOEgirl from Life

== Radio, television, and film ==
- Hear and Now, a 2007 documentary by Irene Taylor Brodsky
- Here and Now (Boston), an American public radio magazine program
- Here and Now (Toronto), a Canadian afternoon-drive radio program
- Here and Now (1955 TV series), a British sitcom featuring Hugh Paddick
- Here and Now (1961 TV series), an American series aired during the 1961-62 television season
- Here and Now (1970 film), a Canadian drama film
- Richard Pryor: Here and Now, a 1983 stand-up film and comedy album
- Here and Now (1992 TV series), a 1992-93 American sitcom
- Here and Now (1994 TV series), a UK current-affairs series presented by Juliet Morris
- Here and Now (2018 TV series), a 2018 American HBO drama series
- Here and Now (2018 film), an American romantic drama film
- Ellen DeGeneres: Here and Now, a series of television specials
- Here and Now (Central Independent Television), a UK multicultural programme produced by Zia Mohyeddin
- CBC News: Here & Now, the evening newscast of CBNT-DT, St. John's, Canada
- Here and Now (Hebrew: כאן ועכשיו), a 2018 film by Israeli film director Roman Shumunov

== Other uses ==
- Here and Now: Letters, 2008-2011, a collection of letters between Paul Auster and J. M. Coetzee
- Here and Now, a UK Situationist magazine whose contributors included Sadie Plant
- Monopoly Here and Now, a variant of Monopoly
- Here & Now (musical), a jukebox musical based on the songs of Steps

== See also ==
- Here and Now and Sounding Good!, a 1966 album by the Dick Morrissey Quartet
- Here Now (disambiguation)
