= There's No One New Around You =

EP by Pronoun
- Released: November 18, 2016
- Genre: Alternative, indie rock, indie pop
- Length: 15:20
- Label: Rhyme & Reason Records
- Producer: pronoun

Pronoun chronology
There's No One New Around You (2016)	I'll Show You Stronger (2019)

There's No One New Around You (stylized in lower-case) is the debut studio EP from the American musician pronoun.

== Content ==
The four-track EP was released on 10-inch vinyl, compact disc and digital download on November 18, 2016. Recorded in her Brooklyn apartment, There's No One New Around You was intended to be a full-length album, until finishing the song "Snowed In", after which, she notes "it just felt like [the record] was done." The album production, mixing, artwork and photography is by Pronoun. The album title is based on an automated message from the social search engine mobile-phone application Tinder, and as Pronoun explains in an interview with City Pulse, after "scrolling through [...] and I reached the end and that's what it said. I thought, 'this is actually really beautiful, if you take it of context.'" It is described as indie rock, post-punk and soft electronic filled with delicate, deeply personal tracks.

The song "Just Cuz You Can't" is about a long-term relationship that she "thought would never end". Its music video was directed by Sabyn Mayfield.

== Reception ==
For the song "Just Cuz You Can't", Stereogum writes it is a "driving and urgent rock song undercut by Vellturo's mumbled, passionate delivery," and Billboard calls it an "emotionally captivating track that channels the evolving timeline of a relationship."

== Track listing ==
No.	Title	Length
1.	"A Million Other Things"	3:48
2.	"Til Your Legs Give Up"	3:49
3.	"Just Cuz You Can't"	3:15
4.	"Snowed In // There's No One New Around You"	4:28
Total length:		15:20

Note

- All tracks are stylized in lower-case
