= Another Michael =

American indie rock band

Another Michael is an American indie rock band from Philadelphia, Pennsylvania. The band is currently signed to Run for Cover Records.

== History ==
Another Michael began in 2015 as the songwriting project of Michael Doherty. He released the first Another Michael EP titled Sans in 2016. Michael soon began collaborating with producer and bassist Nick Sebastiano and multi-instrumentalist Alenni Davis, who both met while attending college at College of St. Rose. The three started making music together and performing in Albany, New York. The band released their second EP and first collaborative release titled Land, in 2018 on Topshelf Records. At the end of 2020, the band announced their debut full-length album to be released in 2021. The album, New Music and Big Pop, was released on February 19, 2021. The album was originally set to be released a year prior, but was delayed due to the COVID-19 pandemic. The band issued the Pick Me Up, Turn Me Upside Down album in 2024.

== Influences ==
The band cites Chris Weisman, The Roches, and Kimbra as influences.

== Discography ==
=== Studio albums ===
- New Music and Big Pop (2021, Run for Cover Records)
- Wishes to Fulfill (2023, Run For Cover Records)
- Pick Me Up, Turn Me Upside Down (Run for Cover Records, 2024)

=== EPs ===
- Sans (2016, Bee Side Cassettes)
- Land (2018, Topshelf Records)

=== Compilation appearances ===
- The Alt's Best of 2018 Comp (2019, The Alternative)
- I Will Swim to You: A Tribute to Jason Molina (2025, Run for Cover Records)
