= Beside Myself (Basement album) =

Studio album by Basement
- Released: 12 October 2018
- Genres: Alternative rock; emo
- Length: 38:15
- Label: Fueled by Ramen
- Producers: Basement; Colin Brittain

Basement chronology
Promise Everything (2016)	Beside Myself (2018)	Wired (2026)

Singles from Beside Myself
- 1. "Disconnect" Released: 1 August 2018; 2. "Stigmata" Released: 7 September 2018; 3. "Be Here Now" Released: 2 October 2018

Professional ratings
Review scores
Source	Rating
Kerrang!	3/5
NME	4/5 stars
Sputnikmusic	4.5/5

Beside Myself is the fourth studio album by English alternative rock band Basement. It was released on 12 October 2018 and is their first and only album to be released by Fueled by Ramen. The album was co-produced by Colin Brittain and the band themselves, engineered by Alex Prieto, and was mixed by Rich Costey.

== Release ==
In May, the group embarked on a co-headlining US tour with Citizen; they were supported by Pronoun and Souvenirs. On 1 August, Beside Myself was announced for release in October. Alongside this, "Disconnect" was released as its lead single; its accompanying music video was directed by Adam Powell. A second single, "Stigmata", was released on 7 September. A third single, "Be Here Now", was premiered on Billboard's website on 2 October 2018. On 11 October, a music video was released for the track, directed by Mason Mercer.

Beside Myself was released on 12 October through Fueled by Ramen. Following this, the band went on a two-week US tour, with support from Elder Brother and Pllush. In November, they went on a headlining UK tour, with support from Joyce Manor. In April 2019, "Be Here Now" was released on 7" vinyl, with the outtake "Are You the One" as the B-side, as part of Record Store Day. During this month, the band went on an Australian tour with the Story So Far. Following this, the group went on a US tour with Nothing, Gouge Away and Teenage Wrist.

== Track listing ==
All tracks are written by Basement; "Slip Away" written with Nicholas Furlong.

No.	Title	Length
1.	"Disconnect"	3:29
2.	"Be Here Now"	3:29
3.	"Nothing Left"	2:45
4.	"Ultraviolet"	3:55
5.	"Keepsake"	3:31
6.	"Changing Lanes"	1:24
7.	"Stigmata"	3:34
8.	"New Coast"	3:53
9.	"Just a Life"	3:43
10.	"Slip Away"	2:57
11.	"Reason for Breathing"	2:24
12.	"Right Here"	4:06

== Personnel ==
Credits are adapted from Tidal.

=== Basement ===
- James Fisher – drums, production
- Andrew Fisher – vocals, production
- Alex Henery – rhythm guitar, backing vocals, production
- Ronan Crix – lead guitar, production
- Duncan Stewart – bass, production

=== Additional contributors ===
- Colin Brittain – production (all tracks); Juno synthesizer, percussion (tracks 1–5, 7–12); backing vocals (1, 2, 7, 8, 10, 12), piano (12)
- Rich Costey – mixing
- Nicholas Fournier – additional mixing
- Billy Centenaro – mixing assistance
- Derrick Stockwell – mixing assistance
- Joe LaPorta – mastering
- Alex Prieto – engineering, additional production
- Brendan Collins – engineering assistance, digital editing
- David Peters – engineering assistance
- Ryan Potesta – engineering assistance
- Sam Madill – engineering assistance
- Meron Ryan – backing vocals (1, 2, 7, 8, 10, 12)
- Ben Sabin – piano (12)
