= Varsity (band) =

American indie rock band

- Origin: Chicago, Illinois
- Genres: Indie rock; indie pop; jangle pop
- Years active: 2013–present
- Labels: Run For Cover, Babe City, Jurassic Pop
- Members: Stephanie Smith; Dylan Weschler; Patrick Stanton; Jake Stolz; Paul Stolz
- Past members: Spencer Smith
- Website: www.varsitytunes.com

Varsity is an American indie rock band from Chicago, Illinois.

== History ==
Varsity released a song on their Bandcamp page in 2013 titled "Turns Out", with a B-Side titled "Downtown". Varsity released their first EP titled Thanks For Nothing in 2014. Varsity released their self-titled first full-length album in 2015. In 2015, Varsity released a new song titled "Cult of Personality", with a B-Side titled "So Sad, So Sad". In mid 2016, Varsity released a song titled "Smash", with a B-Side titled "Still Apart". On April 27, 2018 Varsity released their sophomore record, Parallel Person, on Babe City Records.

On October 30, 2018, Varsity announced their signing with Boston-based independent label Run For Cover Records and released two new singles, "The Dogs Only Listen To Him" and "UFO".

== Band members ==
Current members

- Stephanie Smith – lead vocals, percussion, piano, keyboards, synthesizers (2013–present)
- Dylan Weschler – guitars, backing vocals (2013–present)
- Patrick Stanton – guitars (2013–present)
- Paul Stolz – bass (2013–present)
- Jake Stolz – drums, percussion (2015–present)

Former members

- Spencer Smith – drums, percussion (2013–2015)

== Discography ==
Studio albums

- Varsity (2015; self-released, Jurassic Pop)
- Parallel Person (2018; Babe City)
- Fine Forever (2020; Run For Cover)
- Souvenirs (2024; self-released)

EPs

- Thanks for Nothing (2014; self-released)
- Limited Edition Tour Tape (2016; self-released)

Singles

- "Turns Out" / "Downtown" (2013; self-released)
- "Cult of Personality" / "So Sad, So Sad" (2015; self-released)
- "Eye to Eye" / "Kelly" (2016; self-released)
- "Smash" / "Still Apart" (2016; self-released)
- "The Dogs Only Listen to Him" / "UFO" (2018, Run For Cover)

Compilations

- Singles (2016; self-released)
- The Basement Takes (2015–2016) (2019, Run For Cover)
