= Enumclaw (band) =

American indie rock band (f. 2021)

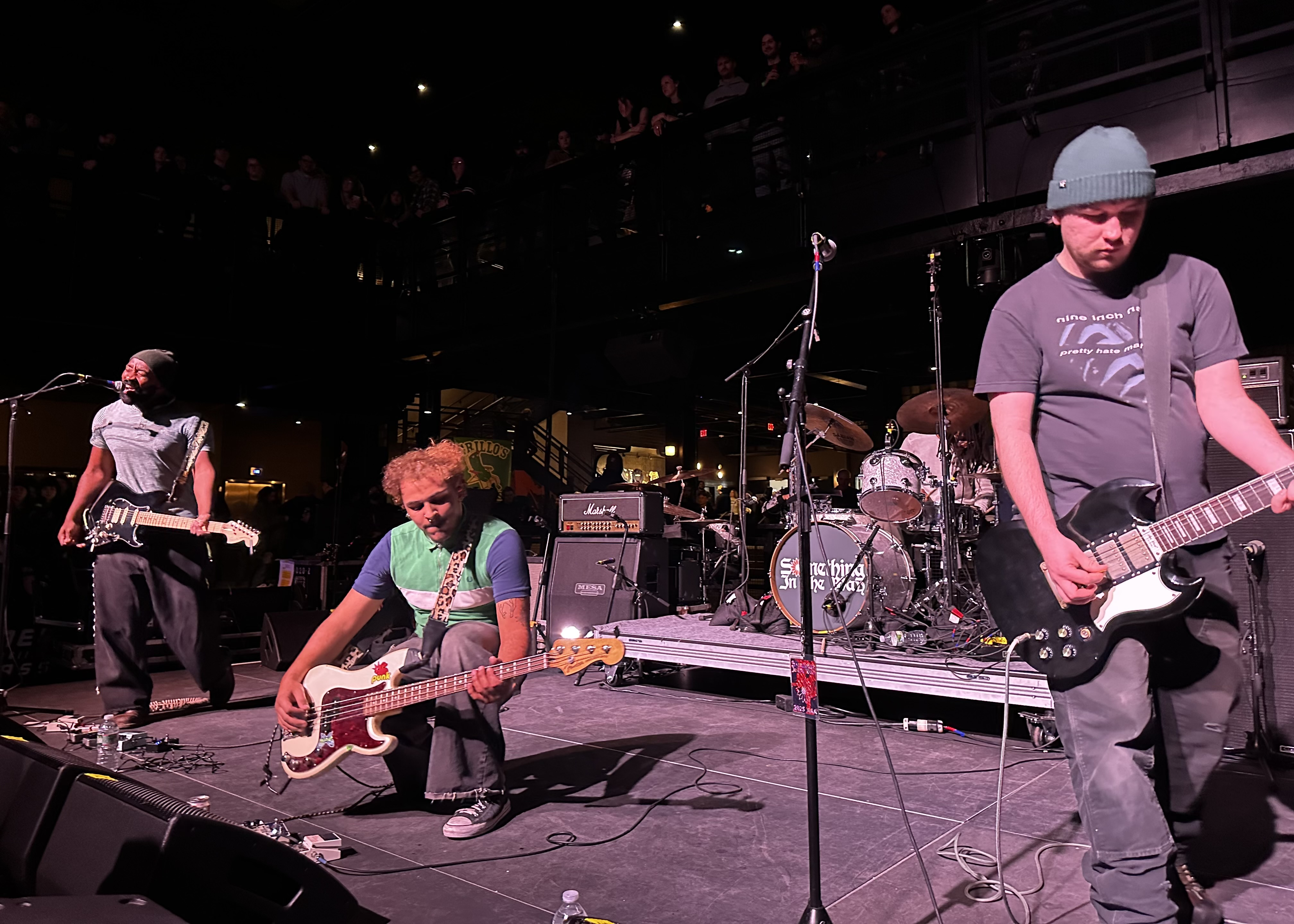
- Enumclaw performing live in February 2025

Background information
- Origin: Tacoma, Washington, U.S.
- Genre: Indie rock
- Years active: 2021–present
- Labels: Youth Riot Records; Luminelle Recordings; Run for Cover Records
- Members: Aramis Johnson; Ladaniel Gipson; Nathan Cornell; Eli Edwards

Enumclaw is an American indie rock band from Tacoma, Washington. The band is named after the city of Enumclaw, Washington. In February 2022, the band was signed to Luminelle Recordings, an imprint of Fat Possum Records under artist management from Benjamin Stein and Drew Abelson. On October 14, 2022, Enumclaw released their debut studio album, Save The Baby. The band embarked on their first European tour in May 2023, making stops in 15 cities. Enumclaw released their second studio album, Home in Another Life, on August 30, 2024.

== Discography ==
=== Studio albums ===
Save the Baby

- Released: October 14, 2022
- Label: Luminelle Recordings
- Producer: Gabe Wax
- Tracks: 11
- Singles: "Save the Baby"

Home in Another Life

- Released: August 30, 2024
- Label: Run for Cover Records
- Producer: Ben Zaidi
- Tracks: 11

=== Extended plays ===
Jimbo Demo (Cover art states six songs but only five are present, missing song "Eat")

- Released: April 30, 2021
- Label: Youth Riot Records
- Producer: Spencer Johndrew
- Tracks: 5

These Are Some B-Sides

- Released: October 18, 2023
- Label: Luminelle Recordings
- Producer: Chaz Bear
- Tracks: 3

"Grocery Store" from the album Home in Another Life

- Released: August 26, 2024
- Label: Run for Cover Records
- Producer: Ben Zaidi
- Tracks: 3

=== Singles ===
"Fast N All" from the album Jimbo Demo

- Released: February 2, 2021
- Label: Youth Riot Records
- Producer: Spencer Johndrew
- Tracks: 1

"Free Drop Billy" from the album Jimbo Demo

- Released: March 24, 2021
- Label: Youth Riot Records
- Producer: Spencer Johndrew
- Director: Tristan Johnson
- Tracks: 1

"2002" from the album Save the Baby

- Released: February 22, 2022
- Label: Luminelle Recordings
- Producer: Gabe Wax
- Director: John C. Peterson
- Tracks: 1

"Jimmy Neutron" from the album Save the Baby

- Released: June 14, 2022
- Label: Luminelle Recordings
- Producer: Gabe Wax
- Director: John C. Peterson
- Tracks: 2

"Cowboy Bebop" from the album Save the Baby

- Released: July 18, 2022
- Label: Luminelle Recordings
- Producer: Gabe Wax
- Director: John C. Peterson
- Tracks: 1

"Park Lodge" from the album Save the Baby

- Released: August 30, 2022
- Label: Luminelle Recordings
- Producer: Gabe Wax
- Director: John C. Peterson, Ethan Scoma
- Tracks: 1

"10th and J 2" from the album Save the Baby

- Released: October 11, 2022
- Label: Luminelle Recordings
- Producer: Gabe Wax
- Director: Ian Ostrowski
- Tracks: 1

"Change" from the album Home in Another Life

- Released: June 12, 2024
- Label: Run for Cover Records
- Writers: Aramis Johnson, Greg Varteresian, Jennifer Decilveo
- Producer: Ben Zaidi
- Director: John C. Peterson
- Tracks: 1

"Not Just Yet" from the album Home in Another Life

- Released: July 23, 2024
- Label: Run for Cover Records
- Producer: Ben Zaidi
- Director: John C. Peterson
- Tracks: 1
