= Horse Jumper of Love =

American indie rock band

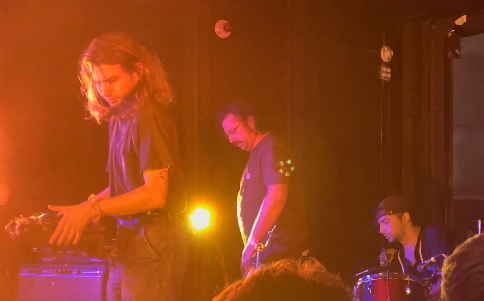
- Horse Jumper of Love in Brooklyn, New York, in 2022. From left to right: Dimitri Giannopoulos, John Margaris, and Jamie Vadala-Doran.

Background information
- Origin: Boston, Massachusetts
- Genres: Slowcore; slacker rock; shoegaze
- Years active: 2013–present
- Label: Run for Cover
- Members: Dimitri Giannopoulos; John Margaris; Jamie Vadala-Doran
- Website: horsejumperoflove.com

Horse Jumper of Love is an American indie rock band from Boston, Massachusetts, that was formed in 2013. It has comprised vocalist-guitarist Dimitri Giannopoulos, bassist John Margaris, and drummer Jamie Vadala-Doran since inception.

== History ==
Horse Jumper of Love released their self-titled first studio album in 2016 to mixed reviews. The single “Ugly Brunette” from the album premiered on Stereogum and was later featured on NPR Music’s series Songs We Missed. On March 8, 2017, they performed an Audiotree live session in which they played tracks from their then untitled 2019 album ahead of its announcement. In April 2017, Joy Void reissued Horse Jumper of Love on 12" vinyl along with the previously unreleased bonus track "Orange Peeler." On April 22, 2019, Horse Jumper of Love announced their new album So Divine, set to release on June 28 through Run for Cover Records. The band also premiered the first single from the album, "Poison," via The Fader, along with a music video directed by Ty Ueda. It was also announced in April 2019 that in July 2019, HJOL would be opening for the seminal slowcore band Duster during several dates of their United States east coast reunion tour.

During the COVID-19 pandemic, Horse Jumper of Love contributed to a benefit compilation titled "The Song Is Coming From Inside The House." Organized by indie rock band Strange Ranger, proceeds from the 24-track album went to Groundswell's Rapid Response Fund, in order to support organizations led by women of color and transgender individuals.

Following the release of So Divine, Horse Jumper of Love released a demo anthology featuring previously unreleased tracks and demos of already existing songs, some with slightly altered names. It was then after this release that Horse Jumper of Love would release their third studio album Natural Part. Featuring notable slowcore sonic devices and similar lyrical themes to their first album, the momentum for the band continued to maintain the band's follower-base.

It was in 2023 where Horse Jumper of Love showed more utility of shoegaze influence in their music with Heartbreak Rules. Following the auditory directions expanded upon by Natural Part and the continued attention and growth in attention drawn to the band as a modern slowcore staple, Heartbreak Rules in some ways returns to the timbres presented by the tonalities in guitar work in their first albums, while expanding intellectually on the themes musically. The album closes with a Smashing Pumpkins cover, "Luna," from Siamese Dream.

Starting in May and June 2024, Horse Jumper of Love began releasing singles to their fifth album, Disaster Trick, which released on August 16.

== Discography ==
=== Studio albums ===
- Horse Jumper of Love (2016, Gawk Records, Disposable America, Joy Void)
- So Divine (2019, Run for Cover)
- Natural Part (2022, Run for Cover)
- Heartbreak Rules (2023, Run for Cover)
- Disaster Trick (2024, Run for Cover)

=== Live albums ===
- Horse Jumper of Love on Audiotree Live (2017, audiotree)
- Horse Jumper of Love - Far Out (2023, audiotree)

=== Compilations ===
- Demo Anthology (2016, Disposable America)

== Members ==
- Dimitri Giannopoulos – guitar, lead vocals
- John Margaris – bass, backing vocals
- Jamie Vadala-Doran – drums, percussion
