= Agent (band) =

American hardcore band from Long Island, New York

Agent was an American hardcore band from Long Island, New York.

== History ==
Agent began in 2006, releasing their first EP titled I Wouldn't Trade That for Anything on Iron Pier Records. In 2008, Agent released their second EP titled Awake In Their World on Run For Cover Records. In 2011, Agent released a split with the band Polygon on Iron Pier.

== Discography ==
EPs

- I Wouldn't Trade That for Anything (2006, Iron Pier)
- Awake In Their World (2009, Run For Cover)

Splits

- Agent/Polygon (2011, Iron Pier)
