= Young Statues =

American emo band

- Origin: Philadelphia, Pennsylvania
- Genres: Emo, indie rock, folk rock, power pop, dream pop
- Years active: 2010–present
- Labels: Run For Cover Records, Banquet Records
- Members: Carmen Cirignano; Tom Ryan; Daniel Bogan; Matt Weber
- Past members: Andrew Richards

Young Statues is an American emo band from Philadelphia, Pennsylvania.

== History ==
Young Statues formed in the winter of 2010 after a series of songs that were initially never intended to be released were recorded between friends. Inspired by the response Carmen Cirignano recruited longtime friends and musicians from the Philadelphia music scene, Tom Ryan and Daniel Bogan to record and release what would become Young Statues self-titled debut album in 2011. The following year they would go on to follow up their self-titled album with a four-track EP titled "Covers" which consisting of a collection of cover songs of artists such as Billy Bragg, The Magnetic Fields, New Order and Ryan Adams.

== Members ==
- Carmen Cirignano - guitar, vocals
- Matt Weber - guitar, vocals
- Daniel Bogan - drums
- Tom Ryan - bass

== Discography ==
=== Studio albums ===
- Young Statues - Run For Cover Records (2011)
- The Flatlands Are Your Friend - Run For Cover Records (2014)

=== EPs ===
- Covers - Run For Cover Records (2012)
- Age Isn't Ours - Run For Cover Records (2013)
- Amarillo - Run For Cover Records (2018)
