= Temple of Angels =

Dream pop band

Temple of Angels is an American gothic dream pop band from Austin, Texas, and Los Angeles, California. The band is currently signed to Run for Cover Records.

== History ==
Temple of Angels released a self-titled EP in 2017. The band released their second EP in 2018 titled Foiled. In 2019, they released a pair of singles, Cerise Dream and Breathless. In 2023, they announced their debut album, Endless Pursuit. They released two further singles for the album, (For You) I’d Lose It All and Waving to the Wind. The album was released on July 14, 2023.
