= Sidney Gish =

American singer-songwriter (born 1997)

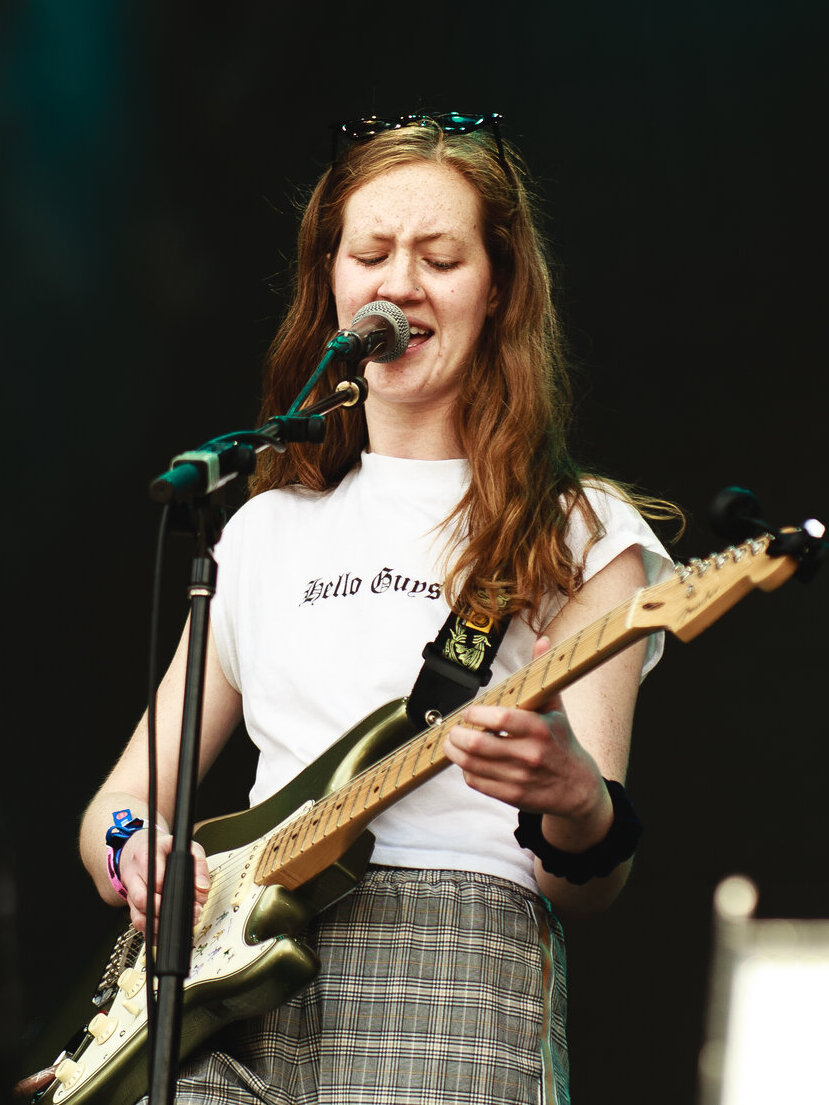
- Gish in 2019

Background information
- Born: March 18, 1997 (age 29)
- Origin: Boston, Massachusetts, US
- Genres: Indie pop; bedroom pop; indie rock
- Occupations: Singer-songwriter; musician; producer
- Instruments: Vocals; guitar
- Years active: 2015–present
- Website: sidneygish.com

Sidney Gish (born March 18, 1997) is an American indie singer-songwriter. She has self-released two albums, Ed Buys Houses (2016) and No Dogs Allowed (2017). She performs and records her music solo.

Gish grew up in New Jersey but moved to Boston to study the music industry at Northeastern University. She began releasing music on Bandcamp in 2015. Her first full album, Ed Buys Houses, received local coverage, and she began performing concerts in Boston. Her second album, No Dogs Allowed, became popular on the internet and received positive critical reception, being named Album of the Year at the 2018 Boston Music Awards. She performed in New York City, where she attended an internship, and went on a national tour with Camp Cope and Petal. She opened for Mitski the same year and released a split single with Cavetown in 2019. In 2023, she released the single "Filming School" through the Sub Pop Singles Club, and she supported tours by the Beths and Jeff Rosenstock.

== Early and personal life ==
Sidney Gish was born on March 18, 1997, and grew up in a suburb in New Jersey. She began composing songs in middle and high school and sang in her school choir. Before her music career, she attempted to go viral on Tumblr. She went viral in 2016 for her doodles that her mother embroidered, which were covered in BuzzFeed News. She attended Northeastern University in Boston, where she studied the music industry, from 2015 to 2020. She was in the college's female a cappella group, Pitch Please, as its beatboxer.

Gish is bisexual. She has perfect pitch, which she has said contributes to her melodic composition.

== Career ==
=== 2015–2017: Early work and Ed Buys Houses ===
Gish started her career by uploading music on Bandcamp. Her first release was don't call on me in 2015, followed by dummy parade in 2016, but she described these as "dump albums" rather than true albums. She released the EP Merry Crisis during the winter break of her first year of college.

Gish's first full album, Ed Buys Houses, was self-released on Bandcamp in December 2016. She edited the album in GarageBand and designed the cover in Photoshop, and the title came from a sign she saw in her hometown. The album received coverage in local publications, including Allston Pudding and DigBoston. Gish began performing concerts at venues in Boston through 2017.

=== 2018–present: No Dogs Allowed and "Filming School" ===
Her second album, No Dogs Allowed, was self-released on Bandcamp on December 31, 2017. The album gained moderate internet success, initially becoming popular within the DIY music community. It received a 7.7 rating on Pitchfork and a positive review by The Fader. Gish was covered in NPR Music's Slingshot, a series about new musicians. At the 2018 Boston Music Awards, she received four nominations, and No Dogs Allowed won Album of the Year.

In 2018, Gish began a semester-long internship in the A&R department of Island Records in Manhattan, which involved finding new musicians. The same week, a song by her was featured by Spotify in its "New Music Friday" playlist, a coincidence that surprised her boss and was described by Gish as "extremely meta". She performed several shows in New York until the end of her internship. She then went on her first national tour, opening for Camp Cope and Petal. She joined the booking agency Agency for the Performing Arts.

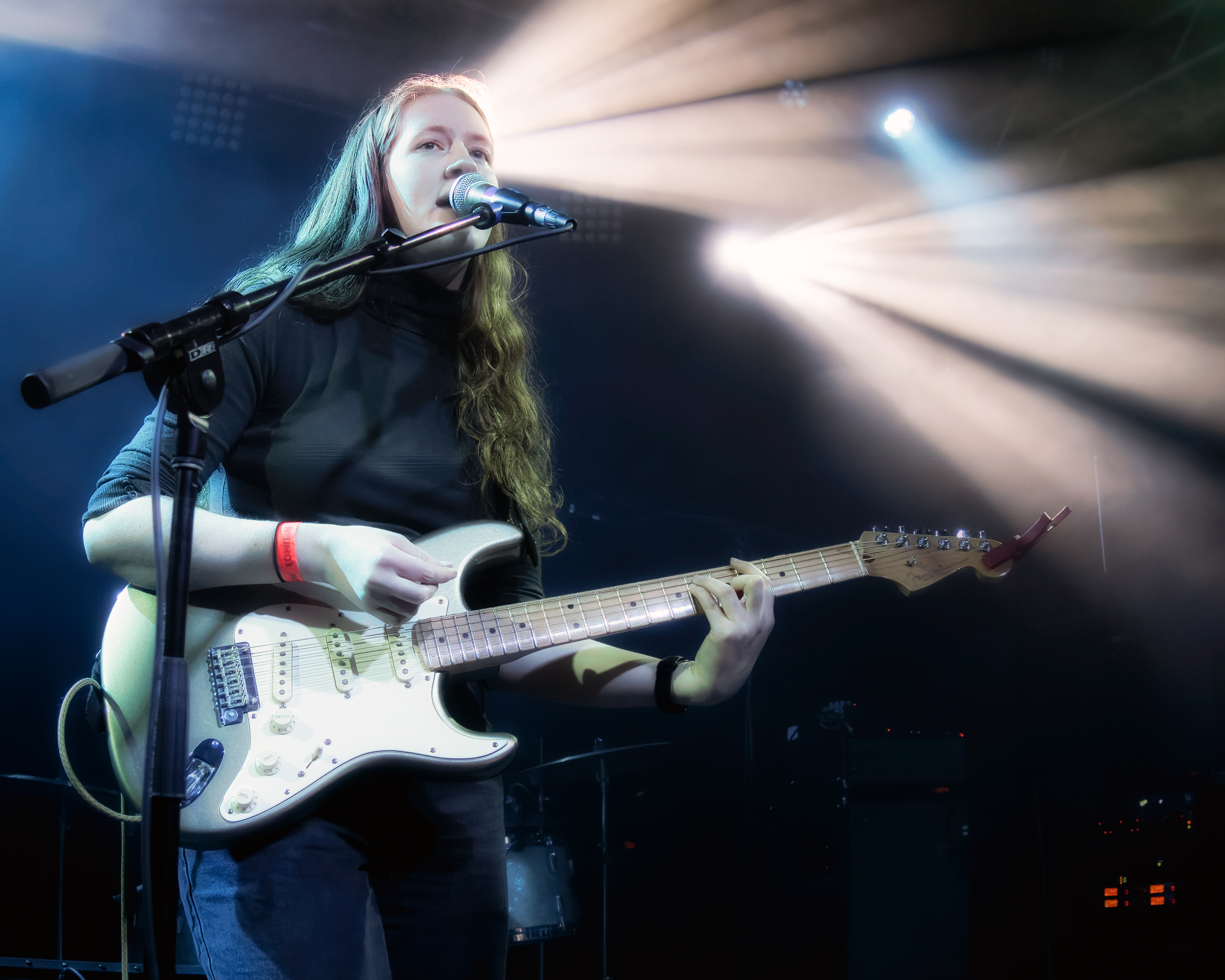
Gish during her 2023 tour with The Beths

Gish's fame increased in 2018 when she opened for Mitski in six shows in New England. She was listed as one of Stereogum's Best New Artists of 2018. That December, she covered a song by the Magnetic Fields as part of a tribute album for the band's 69 Love Songs. In March 2019, she performed at South by Southwest and was featured on NPR Music's Austin 100. The same month, she released a cover of Jackson Browne's "Somebody's Baby" as part of a split single in Cavetown's Animal Kingdom series. She released a music video for "Sin Triangle", a track on No Dogs Allowed, the following May. She and Orla Gartland supported Cavetown's tour in the UK and Ireland later that year. She recorded a duet with Cheekface, titled "Election Day", on its 2022 album Too Much to Ask.

In February 2023, Gish released two new songs, "Filming School" and "MFSOTSOTR", through the Sub Pop Singles Club. The same year, she toured with The Beths in North America. She also went on a tour with Jeff Rosenstock in late 2023, with some shows delayed until 2024 after Rosenstock contracted COVID-19. The indie pop band Grumpy featured Gish, along with Precious Human, in the January 2025 song "Lonesome Ride". The band said Gish was a major influence on its work.

== Style ==
Gish's music has been classified as indie pop, bedroom pop, and indie rock. She has described her composition process as "Frankensteining" separate melodies and lyrics that she keeps on her phone. She records her music solo, playing electric guitar, percussion, piano, ukulele, and melodica, as well as MIDI instruments. She produced her early music using the mobile app VoiceJam before switching to Logic Pro by 2018. In live shows, she uses a loop pedal to perform solo. Gish is frequently compared to Regina Spektor, whom she has called her first influence. Other influences she has listed include Vampire Weekend and of Montreal.

Allston Pudding's Christine Varriale described Gish's music as "humorous pop that millennials can understand but that sounds timeless". Pitchfork's Nina Corcoran compared her "catchy, oddball songs" to Frankie Cosmos and Car Seat Headrest. WBUR-FM's Amelia Mason described her songs as "mundane (or obscure) meanderings peppered by puns and brief, dazzling extrapolations". It also compared her to Car Seat Headrest, who similarly began his career on Bandcamp.

== Discography ==
=== Studio albums ===
Title	Album details
Ed Buys Houses	Released: December 29, 2016; Label: self-released; Format: Digital download
No Dogs Allowed	Released: December 31, 2017; Label: self-released; Format: Digital download

=== Singles ===
Title	Album details
Filming School	Released: February 8, 2023; Label: Sub Pop Records; Format: Digital download

=== Bandcamp exclusives ===
- don't call on me (2015)
- Merry Crisis EP (2016)
- dummy parade (2016)

== Awards and nominations ==
Year	Organization	Award	Work	Result	Ref.
2018	Boston Music Awards	Album of the Year	"No Dogs Allowed"	Won	
2018	Boston Music Awards	Unsigned Artist of the Year	Herself	Nominated	
2018	Boston Music Awards	Alt/Indie Artist of the Year	Herself	Nominated	
2018	Boston Music Awards	Song of the Year	"Not but for You, Bunny"	Nominated	
2019	Boston Music Awards	Singer Songwriter of the Year	Herself	Won	
2019	Boston Music Awards	Alt/Indie Artist of the Year	Herself	Nominated	
2019	Boston Music Awards	Song of the Year	"I'm So Sorry" (as featured artist)	Nominated	
