= The Sun Days =

Swedish indie pop band

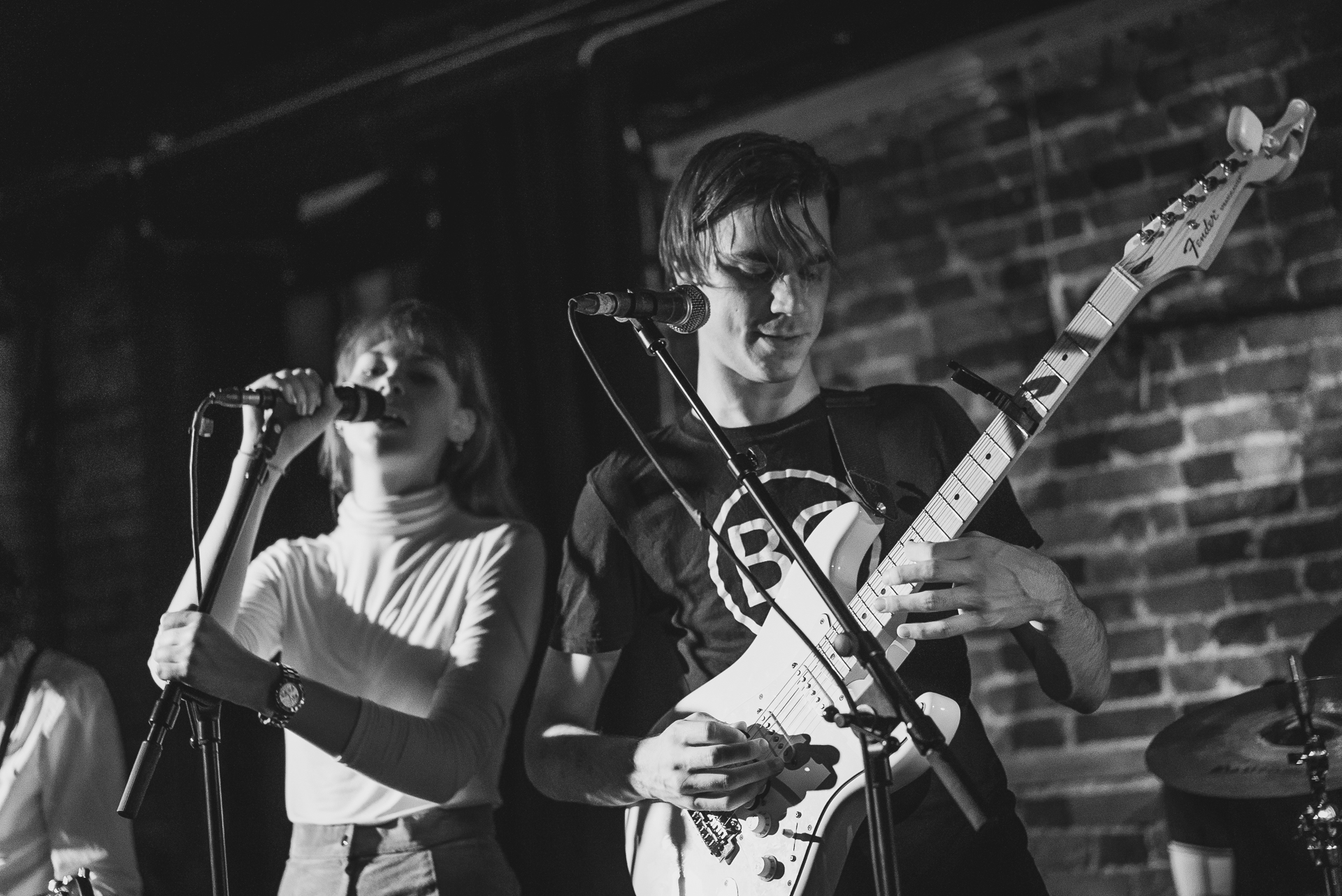
- The Sun Days

Background information
- Genres: Indie pop, Pop
- Years active: 2013–present
- Labels: Run for Cover, Tower Records, Lilystars Records, Luxury, F2F
- Members: Lea Rambell; Johan Ramnebrink; Simon Boontham; Joe Enocsson; Erik Bjarnar
- Past members: Elsa Fredriksson; Karl Prytz
- Website: Official website

The Sun Days is a Swedish indie pop band from Gothenburg, Sweden. Formed in 2013, the group has achieved success both in Sweden and internationally, with their debut album Album appearing on multiple global top lists and earning praise from outlets like Stereogum and Pitchfork.

== History ==
The Sun Days debuted with their single "You Can't Make Me Make Up My Mind" on October 18, 2013, released via Swedish indie label Luxury. In early 2014, they followed up with "Don't Need to Be Them" and "Get Him Off Your Mind". After a quiet period, they released their debut album, Album, on June 5, 2015, through Luxury and Japan’s Tower Records. Recorded by Joe Enocsson, Erik Bjarnar, and Kalle von Hall, and mixed by Hans Olsson Brookes at Svenska Grammofonstudion, the album also saw a digital release via Lilystars Records. In 2015, Run for Cover Records included the track "Come Have Me Over" on a compilation cassette with Urban Outfitters, and in 2016, they released Album as a limited LP, boosting the band’s recognition in the United States and United Kingdom.

The band has performed at prominent venues and festivals, including the Taube Stage at Liseberg, Debaser Medis, and Way Out West. In June 2016, Lea Rambell debuted as vocalist at the Den Bästa Sommaren festival and was later confirmed as permanent singer ahead of a UK tour. In a December 2016 GAFFA interview, guitarist Joe Enocsson opened up about his struggles with addiction, followed by a Popmani feature where he and Rambell discussed music’s role in their mental well-being. In January 2017, they toured Gothenburg, Malmö, and Stockholm.

== Reception ==
Stereogum named The Sun Days one of the world’s best new bands following the 2016 premiere of "Don’t Need to Be Them". Pitchfork lauded the track’s re-release, while Pandora featured them in its Picks of the Week. Album ranked on several best-of-2015 lists, and in 2016, it topped Taking The Lead’s top 25 albums list and was ranked #7 by Norway’s Panorama. KEXP nominated it among the top 10 albums of 2016, and "Don’t Need to Be Them" gained airplay on KEXP and was listed among CAFÈ magazine’s best songs of 2016. The band was nominated for Swedish Breakthrough of the Year by Gaffa in 2015, and their work is featured in the indie pop section of the Gothenburg City Museum’s music exhibition alongside Bad Cash Quartet and Broder Daniel.

== Discography ==
=== Studio albums ===
- Album - CD (2015, Luxury, Tower Records)
- Album - Digital (2015, Lilystars Records)
- Album - LP (2016, Run for Cover Records)
1. "Don't Need to Be Them"
2. "I Keep on Wondering"
3. "OOO"
4. "You Can't Make Me Make Up My Mind"
5. "Come Have Me Over"
6. "Get Him Off Your Mind"
7. "Busy People"
8. "Fear"

=== Singles ===
- "You Can't Make Me Make Up My Mind" (2013, Luxury)
- "Don't Need to Be Them" (2014, Luxury)
- "Get Him Off Your Mind" (2014, Luxury)
- "Busy People" (2015, Luxury)
- "See You Happy" (2025)

== Live performances ==
- Clooneys, Gothenburg (2013)
- Jazzhuset, Gothenburg (2013)
- Sydskånska Nationen, Lund (2013)
- Debaser Medis, Stockholm - Supporting Makthaverskan (2013)
- Jazzhuset, Gothenburg - Release party for "Don't Need to Be Them" (2014)
- Liseberg, Gothenburg (2014)
- Fängelset, Gothenburg - Supporting INVSN (2014)
- Bergrum 211 - Release party for Album (2015)
- Henriksberg, Gothenburg (2015)
- Jazzhuset, Gothenburg - With Ebbot Lundberg and Lo-Fi Deluxe (2015)
- Skjul Fyra Sex, Gothenburg (2016)
- Den Bästa Sommaren, Stockholm (2016)
- Riverside, Newcastle (2016)
- The Brickyard, Carlisle (2016)
- The Globe, Cardiff (2016)
- Slade Rooms, Wolverhampton (2016)
- Lock Tavern, London (2016)
- Chinnery's, Southend (2016)
- The Forum, Tunbridge Wells (2016)
- Talking Heads, Southampton (2016)
- The Hub, Plymouth (2016)
- Way Out West, Gothenburg (2016)
- P4, Sveriges Radio (2016)
- Pustervik, Gothenburg (2016)
- Denim Gallery, Gothenburg (2016)
- Grand, Malmö (2017)
- Pustervik, Gothenburg (2017)
- Debaser, Stockholm (2017)
- Den Bästa Sommaren, Stockholm (2017)
- Majas Vid Havet, Varberg (2017)
- By:Larm, Oslo (2018)

== See also ==
- Bad Cash Quartet
- Broder Daniel
