= Colourmeinkindness =

Studio album by Basement
- Released: 23 October 2012
- Recorded: July 2012
- Studio: The Panda Studios, Fremont, California
- Genre: Alternative rock; soft grunge; emo; indie rock; post-hardcore; punk rock
- Length: 33:38
- Label: Run for Cover
- Producer: Sam Pura

Basement chronology
I Wish I Could Stay Here (2011)	Colourmeinkindness (2012)	Further Sky (2014)

Colourmeinkindness is the second studio album by English rock band Basement, released on 23 October 2012 by Run for Cover Records.

== Background ==
Basement formed in Ipswich in 2010, signing to independent label Run for Cover in August of that year. The band released their debut album, I Wish I Could Stay Here, in July 2011. The group then toured across the UK several times, as well as tour the US and Australia.

== Composition and production ==
Compared to their past releases, guitarist Alex Henery called the process for Colourmeinkindness "the most chaotic process we have ever gone about writing a record." The band members would write parts and sent them over email to each other, and exchanges ideas on the parts. With Henery residing in the US, the group were unable to get together and write in a practice space. With Colourmeinkindness, the group "wanted to explore new sounds and techniques ... We all wanted to push the sound of the band into new places," according to Henery. The album has been described as alternative, emo, soft grunge, indie rock, post-hardcore, punk rock

Recording for Colourmeinkindness took place at The Panda Studios in Fremont, California with producer Sam Pura in July. According to Henery, the group were "forced to work as hard" as they could given a limited time period in the studio. During the first day in the studio, the band were awake until 4am "putting the parts together for songs and pretty much writing songs from scratch." Henery saw this as providing "a fresh approach to writing the album." Pura understood the band's sonic vision and provided a lot of ideas as well as "explore new techniques in layering and texturizing the sound of the album." Pura produced, engineered and mixed the album and enlisted T.W. Walsh to master the album.

== Release and commercial performance ==
On 16 July 2012, Colourmeinkindness was announced for release in the autumn. Three days later, the band announced they were going on hiatus. In said announcement, the group revealed that the hiatus was "[d]ue to a number of personal commitments". In July and August, the band toured across the US alongside Dead End Path, Soul Search and Daylight. On 6 September, "Spoiled" was made available for streaming. Five days later, "Covet" was made available for streaming. Colourmeinkindness was made available for streaming on 15 October, before being released on 23 October through Run for Cover. In mid-November, the band played their final shows in the UK, prior to reforming in 2014.

Colourmeinkindness peaked at number 188 on the Billboard 200, as well as reaching number 1 on Vinyl Albums, number 8 on Heatseekers Albums and number 48 on Independent Albums. Despite the lack of press coverage or live dates to support it, the album has since sold over 25,000 copies worldwide.

== Critical reception ==
Professional ratings
Review scores
Source	Rating
AbsolutePunk	90%
AllMusic	4/5 stars
Alter the Press!	5/5
Dead Press!	9/10 stars
Kill Your Stereo	90/100
Punknews.org	5/5 stars

Colourmeinkindness received positive reviews upon release. AbsolutePunk reviewer Adam Pfleider wrote that the album featured "just as many references to indie, grunge and alternative shoegaze as there are allusions of radio's top 40 at its height in 1996." Pfleider also wrote that the band managed to craft "a near perfect combination of grunge cult and top singles of the '90s." In a short review for AllMusic, Matt Collar wrote that the album "showcases Basement's passionate, sprawling, emo-influenced rock." James Tremain of Alter the Press! wrote that the album owed "as much to mid-90s emo and grunge acts such as Nirvana" as it did to "modern day punk." He went on further to say that the band constructed an album that "knows both when to swing its punches and when to offer a shoulder to cry on," being "equal parts brute force and beauty."

Kill Your Stereo reviewer Maddo wrote that one of the group's most appealing traits was the "honesty and sincerity in Fisher's lyrics." Maddo favourably compared Fisher's voice to that of Sunny Day Real Estate frontman Jeremy Enigk. Punknews.org reviewer RENALDO69 called the album "incredible ... a near-flawless record". He praised Fisher's vocals, referring to them as "top-notch" and "remarkable".

== Track listing ==
No.	Title	Length
1.	"Whole"	3:11
2.	"Covet"	3:48
3.	"Spoiled"	2:45
4.	"Pine"	2:26
5.	"Bad Apple"	2:57
6.	"Breathe"	5:22
7.	"Control"	2:39
8.	"Black"	3:13
9.	"Comfort"	2:20
10.	"Wish"	5:03

== Personnel ==
Personnel adapted from sleeve.

=== Basement ===
- Ronan Crix – guitar
- James Fisher – drums
- Duncan Stewart – bass
- Andrew Fisher – vocals
- Alex Henery – guitar

=== Production ===
- Sam Pura – producer, engineer, mixing
- T W Walsh – mastering
- James Fisher – album art
- Alex Henery – layout, design
- Mitch Wojcik – layout photo

== Chart performance ==
Chart (2012)	Peak position
US Billboard 200	188
US Billboard Heatseekers Albums	8
US Billboard Independent Albums	48
US Billboard Vinyl Albums	1
