= Basement (band) =

English rock band

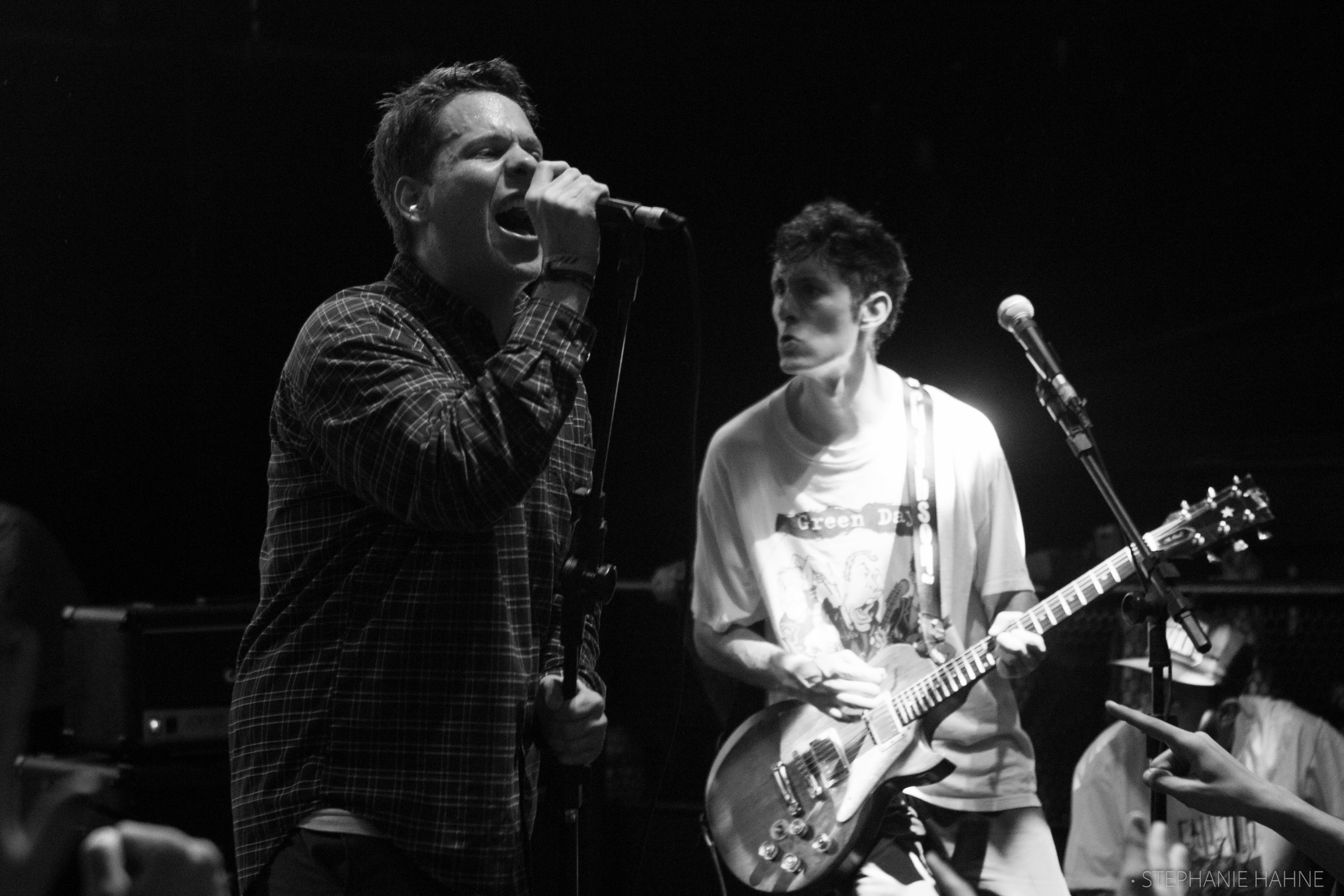
- Basement performing in São Paulo, Brazil, in 2017.

Background information
- Origin: Ipswich, Suffolk, England
- Genres: Alternative rock; soft grunge; post-hardcore; emo; pop punk (early)
- Years active: 2009–2012; 2014–2019; 2021–present
- Labels: City of Gold (non-active); Run for Cover; Fueled by Ramen
- Spinoffs: Fiddlehead
- Spinoff of: In This For Fun
- Members: Andrew Fisher; Alex Henery; Ronan Crix; Duncan Stewart; James Fisher
- Website: www.basementuk.com

Basement are an English rock band from Ipswich, Suffolk. They formed in 2009 and have maintained the same lineup since then: brothers Andrew and James Fisher on lead vocals and drums, respectively; lead guitarist Ronan Crix; rhythm guitarist Alex Henery; and bassist Duncan Stewart. The band were initially active between 2009 and 2012, during which time they released two studio albums: I Wish I Could Stay Here (2011) and Colourmeinkindness. The band were active again between 2014 and 2019, releasing a further two studio albums: Promise Everything (2016) and Beside Myself (2018). The band would sporadically reunite for one-off shows in the early 2020s before returning in earnest circa 2023, following their song "Covet" achieving mass popularity as a sound on TikTok. Their fifth studio album, Wired was released in May 2026.

== History ==
Basement formed in September 2009 in Ipswich, England, following the break-up of pop punk band In This for Fun. In This for Fun released The Away from Home EP before they broke-up. The band picked Basement as a name simply because they "wanted a short name that didn't mean much." On 17 May 2010, the band released their debut EP Songs About the Weather and in August, signed to Run for Cover.

They released their first full-length album, I Wish I Could Stay Here, through Run For Cover Records in 2011. The band promoted the release through several tours, including tours to Australia and two American tours with label mates and friends from Daylight (now Superheaven).

Before the release of their second album Colourmeinkindness, the band announced a hiatus. The group revealed that the break was "due to a number of personal commitments". Colourmeinkindness was released on 23 October and charted at number 188 on the US Billboard 200 chart. In mid-November, the band played their final shows. Guitarist Alex Henery later revealed it was due to vocalist Andrew Fisher wishing to become a certified teacher. This required Fisher to return to school for a period of a year and a half. Drummer James Fisher, Andrew's younger brother, was graduating from Kingston University, and the rest of the members were working on their respective careers. Henery, meanwhile, was working as a videographer in Boston, Massachusetts for Run for Cover.

On 29 January 2014 a tweet was posted on the band's Twitter account simply saying "Hi", and the dates "2008–2012" were removed from their Twitter and Facebook biographies, suggesting the band had returned from their hiatus. The band posted on Facebook later that day confirming that the hiatus was over as well as suggesting that there would be a summer tour.

In June 2014, the band announced that they had recorded a new EP for release in July of that year, entitled Further Sky including two new songs, plus a cover of Suede's "Animal Nitrate". The band toured across Australia, Japan and America between 26 July and 20 August. For the latter, all of the tour dates had sold out. The band then played a trio of shows (London, Leeds and Manchester) in the UK in late October with support from Cloakroom and Newmoon.

Guitarist Alex Henery noted in an August 2014 interview with The Aquarian that they were writing material for a new album. On 29 January 2016, the band released Promise Everything. On 3 February 2017, it was announced that the band had signed to major label Fueled by Ramen.

In July 2018, Basement posted a teaser video on their social media accounts which featured footage of them recording in the studio. One week later, the band released a new single entitled "Disconnect." The song is the lead track from their fourth album, Beside Myself, which was released globally on 12 October. A month before the album is set to be released, the band premiered a second single on Highsnobiety entitled "Stigmata". A third single, "Be Here Now", was released on 2 October 2018.

In October 2018, it was announced that the band would support Weezer and the Pixies on their spring 2019 tour of North America. The band entered a hiatus following the tour, with Henery focusing on both playing in Fiddlehead (who released the album Between the Richness in 2021) and his work as Turnstile's touring videographer and photographer.

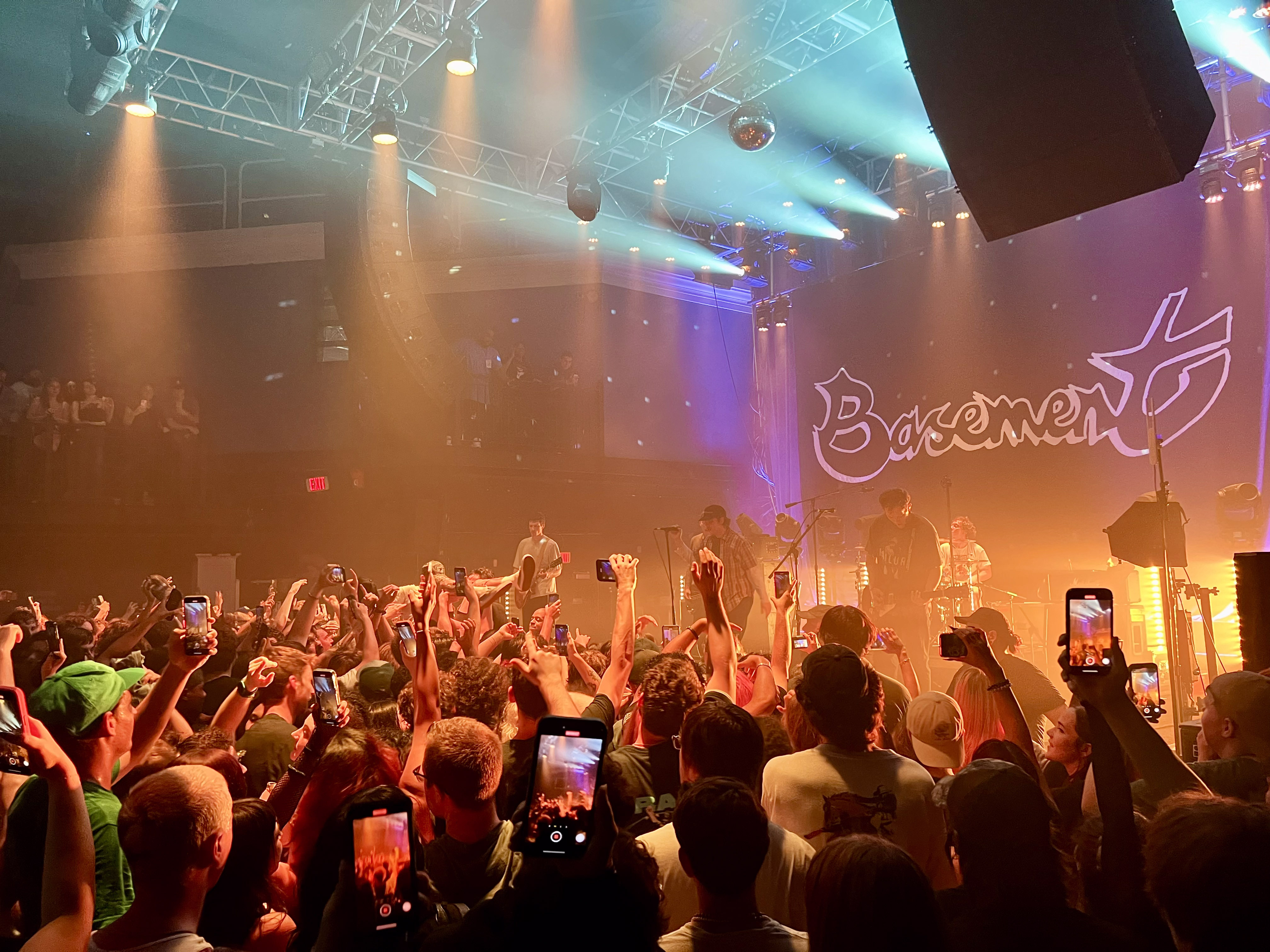
Basement at the 930 Club in September 2024

In 2021, it was announced that Basement would play at the second night of Outbreak Fest 2022, marking the band's first show in three years. The set was billed as celebrating 10 years of Colourmeinkindness and 11 years of I Wish I Could Stay Here. The band also pressed a 10-year anniversary vinyl reissue of the former via Run For Cover later that year, which was released on October 21. In December 2023, the band announced a show to again take place at the following year's Outbreak Fest. The band officially reunited thereafter, announcing US tour dates as well as an appearance at the When We Were Young festival and their official re-signing to Run For Cover Records.

Following a run of shows supporting Turnstile across Australia and New Zealand in January 2026, Basement were announced to be performing at the festival Rock am Ring in Germany. In March 2026, the band formally announced their fifth studio album, Wired, and shared two new singles in its title track and "Broken by Design". The album released on 8 May 2026, via Run for Cover.

== Musical style and influences ==
Critics have categorised Basement as alternative rock, emo, post-hardcore, and soft grunge. On Songs About the Weather, Punknews.org reviewer Brian Shultz compared the band to the likes of Title Fight, Daylight (Superheaven) and Bearings. The EP's sound has been described as pop punk. I Wish I Could Stay Here has been described as emo, pop punk and post-hardcore. Colourmeinkindness has been described as rock, and alternative rock. Further Sky has been described as alternative rock and rock and roll. Promise Everything has been described as alternative rock. AllMusic biographer Matt Collar described the band's sound as influenced by "melodic hardcore punk". Collar later described the band's sound as noise rock.

Basement have cited numerous bands as influences, including the Ataris, the Promise Ring, Mineral, Braid, Smoking Popes, Jets to Brazil, Tigers Jaw, Man Overboard, Sunny Day Real Estate, Failure, Autolux, Cro-Mags, Stephen Bishop, David Bowie, Hey Mercedes, Radiohead, Jawbreaker, Lifetime, Jimmy Eat World and Piebald.

They have been cited as an influence by Teenage Wrist, Muskets, Birdskulls, Fangclub, One Step Closer, Glare and Quannnic.

== Band members ==
- Andrew Fisher – lead vocals
- Ronan Crix – lead guitar
- Alex Henery – rhythm guitar, backing vocals
- Duncan Stewart – bass
- James Fisher – drums

== Discography ==
=== Studio albums ===
- I Wish I Could Stay Here (2011)
- Colourmeinkindness (2012)
- Promise Everything (2016)
- Beside Myself (2018)
- Wired (2026)
