= Hostage Calm =

American punk rock band

- Origin: Wallingford, Connecticut, United States
- Genres: Punk rock, melodic hardcore, heartland rock, power pop, indie rock, emo
- Years active: 2007–2015
- Labels: Headcount, Redscroll, Run for Cover
- Past members: Tom Chiari; Tim Casey; Chris Martin; Nick Balzano; Keith Sidorowicz; Chris Paecht; Brett Pieper; Fred Grave; John Ross

Hostage Calm was an American punk rock band from Wallingford, Connecticut, United States, formed in 2007. Hostage Calm released two extended plays, four full-length albums, and a split with punk band Anti-Flag. The band announced their breakup on October 8, 2014, and played their last show on March 6, 2015.

== History ==
=== 2007–2011: Demo, Lens and Hostage Calm ===
Hostage Calm was formed out of the demise of At All Costs, who broke up in July 2007. Hostage Calm debuted in the summer of 2007 following the release of a Demo 7" on Headcount Records. They signed to Redscroll Records in September 2007. Preceded by "Nosebleed Section", their first full-length, Lens, was released in 2008 on Redscroll Records. In February 2009, it was announced that the band would recorded their next album in April, with the intention of releasing it later in the year. On December 2, 2009, it was announced that the band had signed to Run for Cover Records; alongside this, "Affidavit" was posted online. Shortly after this, Lens was reissued through Panic Records. In January 2010, the band went on an East Coast US tour with My Heart to Joy. They received national attention for their second full-length, Hostage Calm. The self-titled album was critically well-received, and widely praised for its ground-breaking, unique, angular sound. Hostage Calm displayed a marked musical and lyrical growth, incorporating elements of world music, Latin rhythms, power pop, post-hardcore, post-punk and other genres not typically associated with punk.

In July 2010, the band went on a sort East Coast tour with Make Do and Mend. A vocal advocate for LGBT equality, the band gave away its self-titled album for free in exchange of signing an online petition email to Senators opposing marriage equality in the eventually successful 2011 New York Senate vote. The record also featured the protest song, "Ballots/Stones", which assailed the ongoing ban on same-sex marriage in much of America. Hostage Calm has played numerous LGBT benefits, charity releases, and continues to distribute its iconic "I Support Same-Sex Marriage" shirt. In 2011, guitarist Tom Chiari was hired as label manager of Run For Cover Records.

=== 2012–2013: Please Remain Calm ===
In 2012, the band released its seminal Please Remain Calm, to wide critical acclaim. Hailed as "generation-defining" and "the punk album of the Great Recession," Please Remain Calm presents an emotional reflection on the social upheaval of the American recession. Caroline Vallejo (Alter the Press) describes Please Remain Calm as "the accumulation of everything Hostage Calm can do better than anyone else today…they’ve become a voice for their fans and taken back the purpose of American hardcore that so many bands have forgotten." Drew Beringer (AbsolutePunk) praised the album as "the most honest, genuine, and important record you'll hear all year." Musically, Please Remain Calm pushed the boundaries of modern punk by fusing orchestral and a cappella arrangements with the pop sensibility and punk edge of their prior material. The record was live-tracked in Baltimore, MD, where it was co-produced by indie producer, J. Robbins and Hostage Calm.

Hostage Calm has toured the world extensively with such acts as Anti-Flag, Saves the Day, The Wonder Years, Streetlight Manifesto, Balance and Composure, Rival Schools and the 2011 Vans Warped Tour.

=== 2014: Die on Stage and disbandment ===
On July 22, 2014, the band announced their new album, Die on Stage, would be released on September 16, 2014, and released a music video for the single, "Your Head/Your Heart". The record was produced by Will Yip of Studio 4. On October 7, 2014, it was announced that Hostage Calm had dropped off the remaining dates of their tour with Citizen. On October 8, 2014, Hostage Calm announced that they had broken up. All subsequent shows were cancelled. Final shows were played in Philadelphia on February 25 (w/ Such Gold, Clique, and Slaughter Beach, Dog), New York on February 27 (w/ Such Gold and Captain, We're Sinking), Boston on February 28 (w/ Such Gold, Captain, We're Sinking, and Give), Chicago on March 4 (w/ True Love and Luke Schwartz), and their final show at Toad's Place in New Haven Connecticut on March 6.

== Members ==
Final members:

- Tom Chiari – lead guitar (2007–2015)
- Tim Casey – bass, vocals (2007–2015)
- Chris "Cmar" Martin – lead vocals, guitars, piano (2007–2015)
- Nick Balzano – guitar, backing vocals (2010–2015)
- Keith "K. Bot" Sidorowicz – drums (2013–2015)

Former members:

- Chris Paecht – guitar (2008–2010)
- Brett Pieper – drums (2007–2010)
- Fred Grave – drums (2010–2011)
- John Ross – drums (2011–2013)

Touring members:

- Alan Huck – drums (2010)
- Daniel Fang – drums (2011)
- Chris Mala – drums (2011; 2013)
- Joe Longobardi – drums (2013)

== Discography ==
=== Studio albums ===
- Lens (Redscroll Records, 2008)
- Hostage Calm (Run For Cover Records, 2010)
- Please Remain Calm (Run For Cover Records, 2012)
- Die on Stage (Run For Cover Records, 2014)

=== Extended plays ===
- Demo (Headcount Records, 2007)
- Hostage Calm/Anti-Flag (Split with Anti-Flag) (Run For Cover Records, 2013)

=== Singles ===
- War On A Feeling / Donna Lee (Run For Cover Records, 2011)

=== Live albums ===
- Hostage Calm: Audiotree Live (Audiotree, 2012)

=== Compilations ===
- Hostage Calm UK Sampler (Run For Cover Records, 2010)
- All Of Hostage Calm (Ice Grills Records, 2011)
- Tonight, They Won't Take Me Alive (Self-Released, 2013)

=== Appearances on compilations ===
- Enough Is Enough: Volume 3 (Woodland Records, 2010) – "Ballots/Stones"
- 2010 Spring Sampler (Run For Cover Records, 2010) – "Jerry Rumspringer"
- Nervous Energies: Best Of Volume 1 (Nervous Energies, 2011) – "The 'M' Word"
- Mixed Signals (Run For Cover Records, 2011) – "The 'M' Word"
- Fuck Off All Nerds: A Benefit Compilation in Memory of Mitch Dubey (Topshelf Records, 2011) – "Ballots/Stones" & "A Mistrust Earned"
- 2011 Winter Sampler (Run For Cover Records, 2011) – "Young Professionals"
- Nervous Energies: Best Of Volume 2 (Nervous Energies, 2012) – "The 'M' Word"
- CT Sucks Compilation (Driftwood Records, 2012) – "Lacuna (Where Certainty Sleeps)"
- Warped Tour 2012 Tour Compilation (SideOneDummy, 2012) – "The 'M' Word"
- Topshelf Records 2012 Sampler (Topshelf Records, 2012) – "Brokenheartland"
- Run For Cover Records Summer Sampler 2012 (Run For Cover Records, 2012) – "The 'M' Word"
- Topshelf Records 2013 Sampler (Topshelf Records, 2013) – "Olly Olly Oxen Free"
- Less Than Jake/Hostage Calm/Pentimento Tour Sampler (Fat Wreck Chords, 2013) – "Don't Die On Me Now"
- 2013 Summer Sampler (Run For Cover Records, 2013) – "Woke Up Next To A Body"
- The Heart Attack Tour Sampler (Lost Tape Collective, 2014) – "Your Head/Your Heart", "Woke Up Next To A Body" & "The 'M' Word"
- RFC Best of 2014 (Run For Cover Records, 2014) – "Someone Else"

=== Videography ===
- Rebel Fatigues (2010)
- Your Head/Your Heart (2014)
- A Thousand Miles Away From Here (2014)
