= Be Here Now (Basement song) =

Single by Basement

from the album Beside Myself
- Released: October 2, 2018
- Recorded: 2018
- Genre: Rock
- Length: 3:30
- Label: Fueled By Ramen, Warner Bros. (UK)
- Songwriter: Basement
- Producers: Colin Brittain; Basement

Basement singles chronology
"Stigmata" (2018)	"Be Here Now" (2018)

"Be Here Now" is a song by English rock band Basement. It is their single off of their fourth studio album, Beside Myself. It peaked at number 38 on the Billboard Mainstream Rock Songs chart in May 2019, and stayed on the chart for 3 weeks.

== Background ==
The song is a single off of Basement's fourth studio album, Beside Myself, scheduled for release on October 12, 2018. The song was premiered ahead of the album release, exclusively on Billboard's website on October 2, 2018. The song was the third to be released ahead of the album, following the tracks "Disconnect" and "Stigmata".

== Themes and composition ==
Lyrically, the song has been described as a "powerful meditation on the struggle for contentment." Vocalist and lyricist Andrew Fisher described the song as being about his efforts to try to do a better job of living in the moment:

'Be Here Now' is about how hard I find it to feel content with what I'm doing, when I'm doing it. I over-romanticise the past and the future, remembering what has been and looking forward to what will be, in a completely irrational and unfair way. I struggle to enjoy what I'm currently doing because I'm comparing it to a time in my past when I was 'truly' happy, or thinking about being somewhere else in the future when I believe I will be way happier than now."

Musically, the song was described by Billboard as a "melodic rocker" that "strikes a cozy balance between the grunge textures that used to rule alternative radio and classic emo influences". The song has a more somber and reflective sound to it, and was compared to the work of the band Jimmy Eat World.

== Personnel ==
Basement

- Andrew Fisher – lead vocals
- Alex Henery – guitar, backing vocals
- Ronan Crix – guitar
- Duncan Stewart – bass
- James Fisher – drums

Additional personnel

- Colin Brittain – production
- Rich Costey – mixing

== Charts ==
Chart (2019)	Peak position
US Mainstream Rock (Billboard)	38
