= Westkust =

Swedish band

- Origin: Gothenburg, Sweden
- Genres: Indie rock, shoegaze, dream pop
- Years active: 2010–2023
- Labels: Luxury, Run for Cover
- Past members: Julia Bjernelind; Philip Söderlind; Pär Carlsson; Brian Cukrowski; Rikard Hjort; Gustav Andersson; Hugo Randulv
- Website: westkust.bandcamp.com

Westkust was a Swedish rock band from Gothenburg, Sweden. Formed in 2010, the band originally consisted of Julia Bjernelind (vocals), Brian Cukrowski (guitar), Philip Söderlind (drums) and Rikard Hjort (bass) before being joined by Makthaverskan members Gustav Andersson (guitar/vocals) and Hugo Randulv (bass/guitar) the following year.

The band put out two albums: Last Forever (2015) and Westkust (2019), undergoing significant lineup changes in between as Hjort, Andersson and Randulv all departed. On 7 January 2023, Westkust announced its breakup on Facebook.

== History ==
Westkust began in 2010 without a consistent lineup or sound. In 2011, the band added Hugo Randulv and Gustav Andersson of the post-punk band Makthaverskan and finalized their lineup. They released their first EP, titled Junk EP in 2012 via Luxury. The following year, they released a 7" titled "Summer 3D/Weekends".

On 2 March 2015, Westkust premiered their single "Swirl" from their then upcoming debut studio album. The album, titled Last Forever, was released on April 22, 2015, in Scandinavia and was released in the United States on July 10, 2015, via Run for Cover. The band began writing their second album in 2016, but Hjort first left the band followed by both Makthaverskan members Andersson and Randulv. The band replaced them with guitarist Brian Cukrowski and bassist Pär Carlsson, with Bjernelind becoming the band's sole vocalist and also playing guitar. Westkust's self-titled second album was released on 1 March 2019 via Run for Cover as its first label Luxury Records disintegrated.

On 7 January 2023, the band announced that it had broken up on Facebook.

== Band members ==
=== Final lineup ===
- Julia Bjernelind — vocals, guitar (2010–2023)
- Philip Söderlind — drums (2010–2023)
- Brian Cukrowski — guitar (2010–2011, 2019–2023)
- Pär Carlsson — bass (2019–2023)

=== Former members ===
- Rikard Hjort — guitar, bass (2010–2016)
- Gustav Andersson — vocals, guitar (2011–2016)
- Hugo Randulv — guitar, bass (2011–2016)

== Discography ==
=== Studio albums ===
- Last Forever (2015, Luxury and Run For Cover)
- Westkust (2019, Run For Cover)

=== EPs and singles ===
- "Junk EP" (2012, Luxury)
- "Summer 3D" / "Weekends" (2013, Luxury)
