= The Aquatic Adventure of the Last Human =

2016 video game

- Developers: YCJY; Stage Clear Studios (Xbox One, PlayStation 4)
- Publishers: YCJY (Windows, OS X, Linux); Digerati Distribution (Xbox One, PlayStation 4, Nintendo Switch)
- Engine: GameMaker Studio
- Platforms: Linux, Microsoft Windows, OS X, Xbox One, PlayStation 4, Nintendo Switch
- Release: Microsoft Windows, Linux, OS X: WW: January 19, 2016; Xbox One: WW: January 19, 2018; PlayStation 4: NA: January 23, 2018; EU: January 24, 2018; Nintendo Switch: WW: January 3, 2019
- Genre: Metroidvania
- Mode: Single-player

The Aquatic Adventure of the Last Human is a 2D metroidvania action-adventure video game. Developed by YCJY, the game was released for Microsoft Windows, OS X and Linux in January 2016. Ports for Xbox One and PlayStation 4, developed by Stage Clear Studios, were released in January 2018, followed by a Nintendo Switch port in January 2019.

== Gameplay ==
The game takes place in the far future. The player character returns to Earth following an extended trip in space to find that humans have become extinct. The ice caps have melted, the magnetic poles have shifted and mass sub-tectonic water reservoirs have been breached. Players must navigate through the drowned Earth in their submersible to piece together the story of humanity's downfall.

The game is a side-scrolling shoot 'em up presented in a pixel art style. The game is largely exploratory, and most of the sea life is non-threatening, however players encounter multiple boss monsters. In typical Metroidvania fashion, players can acquire upgrades to their submersible, and these upgrades allow the player to access more of the game world. Completing the main game unlocks a "Boss Rush" mode, where players face off against the game's bosses in succession.

== Development ==
The Aquatic Adventure of the Last Human was developed by YCJY, a Swedish development studio consisting of Josef Martinovsky and Christopher Andreasson. The soundtrack was composed by Karl Flodin. The game was part funded through Kickstarter, raising 61,777 kr on the crowdfunding platform in 2015.

YCJY did not set out to make a game dealing with climate change, but felt the theme was a natural fit for their underwater environments. Aside from the genre pioneers such as the Metroid and Castlevania series, YCJY also cite games such as Shadow of the Colossus, Teleglitch and the Dark Souls series as inspirations. The game's bosses, which can both dwarf the player character and defeat the player character in a few hits, were designed to make players feel insignificant and fragile. YCJY likened the contrast in mood and difficulty between the exploration and boss fights to the Pixies song "Tame", the loud and soft parts accentuating the other.

== Reception ==
Reception

Aggregate score
Aggregator	Score
Metacritic	76/100 (11 reviews)

Review scores
Publication	Score
Destructoid	8.5/10
GameSpot	8/10
PC Gamer (US)	90/100
Hardcore Gamer	3.5/5

The Aquatic Adventure of the Last Human was generally well received by critics, scoring 76/100 on reviews aggregation website Metacritic based on 11 reviews. Critics praised the game's sense of place, Alexander Chatziioannou, writing at Hardcore Gamer described it as "an entrancingly desolate world, its beauty emphasizing the awareness that in this land of majestic undersea giants you’re the invader". Ben Davis at Destructoid found the "painstakingly hand drawn" environments "[coming] to life in movement" to such an extent that screenshots did not do the game justice. Mat Paget, at GameSpot, noted how the music enhanced the atmosphere, that it could "[ignite] a sense of wonder". He did however find the player character difficult to pick out against the background at times, which could lead to unfair deaths.

The boss encounters were found to be fun. James Davenport, writing at PC Gamer described them as "massive and multifaceted", and despite him taking approximately thirty tries in one particular encounter, he still persevered, feeling that he was responsible for the failure, not the game. Davis agreed, writing that the bosses required "puzzle-solving skills, strategy, quick reflexes, and most of all perseverance." According to Paget, overcoming such challenges granted "a feeling of immense satisfaction", the "reward for patient, measured play."

Paget felt that the story fragments were written exceptionally well and its approach neither pretentious or preachy. Chatziioannou disagreed, describing the writing as "a series of cringeworthy snippets of eco awareness with all the subtlety of high school activism", a message awkwardly juxtaposed with gameplay that encouraged the destruction of wildlife. Davenport considered his motivations as he killed creature after creature, continuing on through the sake of play and pleasure, and they caused him to reflect on how his real world actions too could harm others.
