= I Wish I Could Stay Here =

Studio album by Basement
- Released: 5 July 2011
- Recorded: May 2011
- Studio: Stuck on a Name, Nottingham
- Genre: Emo; post-hardcore; pop-punk
- Length: 28:26
- Label: Run for Cover

Basement chronology
Songs About the Weather (2010)	I Wish I Could Stay Here (2011)	Colourmeinkindness (2012)

I Wish I Could Stay Here is the debut studio album by English rock band Basement. After forming in 2010, the band released a demo and signed to Run for Cover. Following this, the band toured across the UK and Europe in late 2010 and early 2011. They recorded their debut album I Wish I Could Stay Here in May 2011 at Stuck on a Name Studios in Nottingham. "Grayscale" was made available for streaming in June. I Wish I Could Stay Here was released a month later. Following this, the group embarked on tours of the UK, the US and Australia. The album received favourable reviews from critics, and featured on Thrash Hits' top 20 albums of 2011 list.

== Background and production ==
Basement formed in Ipswich in 2010 and released a demo shortly afterwards. In August of that year, it was announced that the band had signed to independent label Run for Cover and was aiming to release their debut album in 2011. Guitarist Alex Henery explained that after the group began discussions with Run for Cover founder Jeff Casazza, "it just kind of came together." On the same day, Two Songs was released for free download. Basement went on a UK tour alongside Tigers Jaw and End of a Year in December 2010 and January 2011. In March 2011, the band went on a UK tour alongside Hostage Calm and Daylight. Following this, the band toured across Europe in April alongside Brutality Will Prevail and More Than Life.

I Wish I Could Stay Here was recorded at Stuck on a Name Studios in Nottingham with Ian Boult in May. "Plan to Be Surprised" and "Every Single Word" from Two Songs were re-recorded for the album. Jesse Cannon mixed and mastered the recordings at Cannon Found Soundation Recording Studios. According to vocalist Andrew Fisher, the band wrote material they were "comfortable with and what we feel is us." Fisher explained that the lyrics he wrote were "stuff that's happened to me, or stuff that I'm interested in." The album's sound has been described as emo, pop punk and post-hardcore. The album opens with a sample of the movie An Affair to Remember (1957). Track 2, "Plan to Be Surprised", takes its name from the film Dan in Real Life (2007).

== Release ==
On May 19, I Wish I Could Stay Here was announced for release, and the album's artwork and track listing was revealed. At the end of the month, the band appeared at the Slam Dunk Festival. On 14 June, "Grayscale" was made available for streaming. Later that month, the band performed at Ghostfest. I Wish I Could Stay Here was released on 5 July through Run for Cover. In July, the band supported Title Fight on their headlining UK tour. In early August, the band played at the Hevy Festival. For the first half of August, the band supported Such Gold on their tour of the US, while for the second half the band supported Daylight. In February 2012, the group supported Touché Amoré for two UK shows. In April, the band went on the Rocksound Impericon Exposure Tour with Man Overboard, Trapped Under Ice and Your Demise. In late June and early July, the band went on a tour of Australia with Endless Heights.

== Reception ==
Professional ratings
Review scores
Source	Rating
AbsolutePunk	82%
Alter the Press!	5/5
Dead Press!	8/10 stars
Kill Your Stereo	96/100

I Wish I Could Stay Here received a favourable response from critics. AbsolutePunk reviewer Alex Djaferis wrote that the album was "a welcome shot in the arm" for a saturated music scene full of "limp copycats of glory days long gone." He called the band's sound "fresh" with "a direct energy ... denotes a clear purpose, and that is to rock, very hard." Djaferis considered the band's lyrics as being "to the point and relatively solid." Chantelle Goodchild of Alter the Press! viewed the album as "half an hour of pure brilliance", incorporating post-hardcore, pop-punk and emo, the group "sound a million miles" from home. Goodchild found it difficult to pick out a particular song "for individual praise when they're all so flawless."

Kill Your Stereo reviewer Maddo called Fisher's vocals "cleaner and improved", compared to the band's past work, and compared them to that of Title Fight frontman Jamie Rhoden. Maddo viewed the album as "not sound[ing] like a debut album," but rather "the work of a band who have been making music together for many years now." I Wish I Could Stay Here was included at number 20 on Thrash Hits' top 20 albums of 2011. Writing for Thrash Hits, Lock Johnson wrote that the album contained "more soul, more emotion, and just more great songs" than any of the band's contemporaries.

== Track listing ==
1. "Fading" – 2:17
2. "Plan to Be Surprised" – 2:19
3. "Canada Square" – 4:08
4. "Crickets Throw Their Voice" – 3:25
5. "Earl Grey" – 2:35
6. "Ellipses" – 3:40
7. "Every Single Word" – 1:57
8. "Yoke" – 2:26
9. "Grayscale" – 2:29
10. "March" – 3:15

== Personnel ==
Personnel per sleeve.

Basement

- James Fisher – drums
- Duncan Stewart – bass
- Andrew Fisher – vocals
- Ronan Crix – guitar
- Alex Henery – guitar

Production

- Ian Boult – recording
- Jesse Cannon – mixing, mastering
- Henry Alexander – cover art
- Laura Wallace – cover art
