= Makthaverskan =

Swedish post-punk band

- Origin: Gothenburg, Sweden
- Genres: Post-punk; dream pop; jangle pop; gothic rock
- Years active: 2008–present
- Labels: Luxury (Sweden), Run For Cover (US)
- Members: Maja Milner; Hugo Randulv; Irma Pussila Krook; Per Svensson; Andreas Palle Wettmark
- Past members: Gustav Data Andersson
- Website: www.makthaverskan.se

Makthaverskan are a Swedish post-punk band from Gothenburg, formed in 2008. Led by vocalist Maja Milner, the band combines post-punk with elements of dream pop, jangle pop, gothic rock and shoegaze.

== History ==
Makthaverskan began in 2008 with the release of both a mini CD with a collection of demos and their debut self-titled album, released by Luxury Records. According to vocalist Maja Milner, the name Makthaverskan refers to the female version of the Swedish word makthavare, which refers to a powerful male. The name came from a friend of band member Hugo Randulv, and Milner said "it describes Irma and me pretty well, since we both take charge and are powerful." Milner was 16 when the band formed and Makthaverskan quickly ascended the Swedish festival circuit.

The band was influenced by Broder Daniel, a Swedish alternative rock band popular in the 1990s, as well as The Smiths and Cocteau Twins. Milner said, "The main reason we started Makthaverskan is because we were so irritated about this one band [from Sweden] that was so famous. And there was no real feeling, it was just… boring guitars. There was a big punk scene in the 90s with Broder Daniel, but then it died and everyone started making this baby-singing kind of music."

In an interview with Pitchfork, Milner declared that Makthaverskan represented a rejection of the popular Swedish music of its era, such as Robyn and Lykke Li. "We're against it... They are only representing Sweden because they are famous cute girls."

In 2011, the band released the single "Antabus". Two years later, the band released both a 7" single titled "Something More" and their second full-length album Makthaverskan II, which contained those singles. Around this time, Milner moved to Berlin as a result of her interest in electronic music. Pitchfork named "Asleep" the 73rd-best song of 2014, and Makthaverskan II received recognition from the site as one of the most overlooked albums of the year.

In 2015, the band released a 7" single titled "Witness", which Pitchfork awarded with its Best New Track honor. The band's third album III came out in 2017, and guitarist Gustav Data Andersson left the band prior to its release in order to embark on a solo career. Andersson and Randulv also played in the band Westkust from 2011 to 2016.

The band's fourth album För Allting was released in 2021, supported by the lead single "This Time".

In November 2025, the band released "Pity Party", the lead single to their fifth album Glass and Bones. The album was released on 3 April 2026, and it was named "Album of the Week" by Stereogum, who described it as "the Sundays jolted to life with the hair-raising intensity of Love Is All, or Alvvays haunted by the spirit of Siouxsie and the Banshees."

== Band members ==
- Maja Milner (vocals)
- Hugo Randulv (bass, guitar)
- Irma Pussila Krook (bass, guitar)
- Per Svensson (guitar)
- Andreas Palle Wettmark (drums)

Earlier members:

- Gustav Data Andersson (guitar)

== Discography ==
Studio albums

- Makthaverskan (2009, Luxury, Run for Cover)
- Makthaverskan II (2013, Luxury, Run for Cover)
- III (2017, Luxury, Run for Cover)
- För Allting (2021, Run for Cover)
- Glass and Bones (2026, Welfare)

Singles

- "Antabus" (2011, Luxury)
- "Something More" (2013, Luxury)
- "Witness" (2015, Luxury, Run for Cover])
- "In My Dreams" (2017, Luxury)
- "Demands/Onkel" (2019, Luxury, Run for Cover)
