= Pronoun (musician) =

American musician

- Origin: Brooklyn, New York
- Genre: Indie pop
- Instruments: vocals, guitar, bass guitar, keyboards, programming
- Years active: 2015-present
- Labels: Rhyme & Reason, Wax Bodega
- Website: www.musicpronoun.com

Alyse Vellturo, known professionally as Pronoun (stylized pronoun/PRONOUN), is an American singer-songwriter and multi-instrumentalist one-woman band based in Brooklyn, New York. Her music has been described by critics as indie/synth and indie pop. Billboard named her as one of their breakout indie artists for 2019. She is also the founder of the record label Sleep Well Records.

== Life and career ==
Vellturo is a Boston native. She originally started out with piano lessons, guitar lessons, and some drum lessons before taking a break from music to play sports. Eventually Vellturo returned to playing music and later attended the Berklee College of Music where she originally planned to study composition and performance. Shortly after beginning her studies at Berklee, Vellturo switched to audio engineering, production, and business. After graduating she began working in the industry as a music manager and distributor. Vellturo turned to making her own music at age 28 as a way to express herself creatively after a bad breakup.

Vellturo originally wanted to name her project monachopsis, a term for the subtle but persistent feeling of being out of place; however, a friend at her record label insisted she call herself something that was less obscure and easier to pronounce. Vellturo gave the friend 30 minutes to come up with a better name and the friend returned with the suggestion pronoun.

In 2016 Vellturo debuted with her EP There's No One New Around You. The title is a reference to the message that appears on Tinder when there are no new matches on the app. The whole EP was recorded in the bedroom of her apartment. Vellturo played all the instruments, except the drums, which were recorded using a drum machine. The first single, "a million other things," was featured on Spotify's “New Music Friday” playlist in November 2016 and earned nearly half a million streams.

In 2017 Vellturo played at the SXSW music festival and the Savannah Stopover Music Festival, and in 2018 she played at Chicago's Riot Fest.

Her debut studio album I'll Show You Stronger was released via Rhyme & Reason on May 24, 2019. This LP was also recorded in Vellturo's apartment (except for the drums) and exemplifies what Vellturo calls "indie-emo-bedroom-rock-that no-one-asked-for." The album received overall positive reviews from The Boston Globe, Pitchfork, who gave the album a score of 6.5, and Exclaim! which gave the album a 9/10 rating. The album was ranked 19 on billboard magazine's 25 Best Rock and Alternative Albums list. In 2019 it was announced that she would open for the US leg of the Jimmy Eat World tour.

In 2021 Vellturo released her second EP OMG I MADE IT. The lead single, ″I WANNA DIE BUT I CAN’T (CUZ I GOTTA KEEP LIVING)″ received positive press from Stereogum, MTV, and Billboard, where it landed the 44th spot in their June article ″The 50 Best Songs of 2021 So Far: Staff Picks″ and 98th on Billboard's top 100 songs of 2021 where it was described "as both a scream-along anthem about stunted emotional growth, and proof as to why Pronoun leader Alyse Vellturo needs to be playing bigger stages" Vellturo describes the EP as "kind of like making fun of myself, like in a cheeky way kind of" and includes adding a typo to "SOUND THE ALARMS!!!1!" and deciding to "rebrand" herself by using all capitalized letters for both the EP and PRONOUN name.

== Discography ==
Albums

- i'll show you stronger (2019)

EPs

- There's No One New Around You (2016)
- OMG I MADE IT (2021)
