= Run for Cover Records =

American independent record label

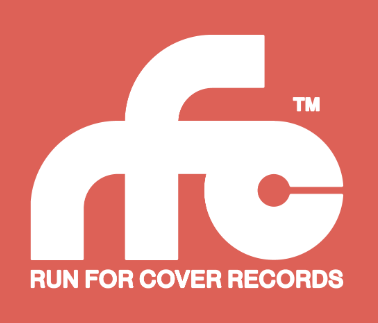
- Founded: 2004
- Founder: Jeff Casazza
- Status: Active
- Distributor: Secretly Distribution
- Genre: Indie rock; alternative rock; emo; hardcore punk; shoegaze; soft grunge
- Country of origin: U.S.
- Location: Boston, Massachusetts
- Official website: runforcoverrecords.com

Run for Cover Records is an American independent record label based in Boston, Massachusetts. Founded in 2004 by Jeff Casazza at the age of 17 with a $1,000 loan, the label functioned as a small one-person bedroom operation in Brighton, until Casazza graduated from Suffolk University in 2010. From there, the label slowly grew to an internationally staffed 10 person operation.

RFC has worked with many young bands such as Tigers Jaw, Modern Baseball, Title Fight, Citizen, Turnover, Pinegrove, Basement, and many more, as well as working with already notable acts like AFI, Alex G, Camp Cope, Glass Beach, mewithoutYou, Teen Suicide, and Nothing.

Its YouTube channel, which features songs and videos from artists on their roster, has 200,000 subscribers and over 154 million views (as of January, 2025).

In 2026, the label received two RIAA Certified Platinum singles for Basement and Superheaven, as well as #1 Rock Records for both AFI "Silver Bleeds the Black Sun" in the US, and Basement "Wired" in the UK.

== History ==
=== 2004–2010 ===
RFC was largely operated out of multiple apartments while Casazza attended Suffolk University. Releasing only 7-inch EPs and singles up until 2009, in 2010, the label released eight LPs, mostly from bourgeoning northeastern rock bands like Balance and Composure, Tigers Jaw, The Wonder Years, and Hostage Calm. The label started gaining traction quickly due to the rising DIY music scenes along the East Coast, most notably northeastern Pennsylvania, where Title Fight, Balance and Composure, Tigers Jaw, and other bands are from.

=== 2011–2013 ===
In 2011, the label moved into a downtown Back Bay apartment rented by Kevin Duquette, owner of Topshelf Records. At this time, the label officially hired its first employees, label manager Tom Chiari and high school friend Taylor Sullivan to handle mail-order. Later in the year, the label released Basement's debut LP I Wish I Could Stay Here, eventually hiring guitarist Alex Henery in 2012. Also in 2011, RFC released the Mixed Signals compilation consisting of exclusive material from RFC artists, as well as friends and affiliated acts, including songs from Balance and Composure, The World Is a Beautiful Place & I Am No Longer Afraid to Die, The Menzingers, and Tigers Jaw. The album was sold in hundreds of stores across the country for $4.99.

In 2012, RFC signed Citizen and Turnover, the first bands to officially sign 3 album deals with the label. The first release with the label for both bands was a split 7-inch EP that quickly became the label's fastest-selling release at the time.

=== 2014–present ===
In 2014, RFC parted ways with distributors Revelation Records and Cobraside Distribution, signing a worldwide deal with Alternative Distribution Alliance, Warner Music Group's independent distribution arm.

Later that year, RFC won "Record Label of the Year" from renowned Boston publication The Improper Bostonian.

2015 saw the release of Turnover's sophomore LP Peripheral Vision, which would go on to SoundScan over 275,000 copies.

RFC launched Something In The Way Festival on December 14, 2016, selling out all three rooms of Webster Hall in New York City, and the Royale in Boston. The festival featured artists and friends curated by the label, including Modern Baseball, Basement, Citizen, Turnover, mewithoutYou, Pinegrove, Nothing, Alex G, Elvis Depressedly, Teen Suicide, Nicole Dollanganger, Crying, Horse Jumper of Love, and Petal.

Something In The Way Festival returned in February 2025 in Boston, MA, selling out 2 shows at the Roadrunner, and a pre-show at the Sinclair. Bands included were Slowdive, Soccer Mommy, American Football, Fiddlehead, Balance and Composure, Mannequin Pussy, Anxious, and many more.

In 2019, RFC joined Captured Tracks, Sacred Bones, Dead Oceans, Ghostly International and Jagjaguwar at Secretly Distribution.

== Artists ==
=== Current ===
- Advance Base
- AFI
- Angel Du$t
- Anxious
- Armlock
- Basement
- Citizen
- Cursive
- Fiddlehead
- Fury
- Great Grandpa
- Horse Jumper of Love
- Graham Hunt
- Narrow Head
- Nothing
- One Step Closer
- Pelican
- Portrayal of Guilt
- Rival Schools
- Sadurn
- Self Defense Family
- Sun June
- Teen Suicide
- Turnover
- Wicca Phase Springs Eternal
- Young Guv

=== Past & affiliated ===
- Adventures
- Agent
- Alex G
- Anne
- Another Michael
- Bridge and Tunnel
- Camera Shy
- Camp Cope
- Captain, We're Sinking
- Cloakroom
- Coasta
- Creative Adult
- CSTVT
- Crying
- Death Is Not Glamorous
- Elvis Depressedly
- Enumclaw
- Field Medic
- Fireworks
- GDP
- Glass Beach
- Healing Potpourri
- Hostage Calm
- Katie Dey
- Lannds
- Little Big League
- LVL UP
- Makthaverskan
- Memorial
- mewithoutYou
- Mini Trees
- Mockingbird Wish Me Luck
- Modern Baseball
- Nicole Dollanganger
- Petal
- Pinegrove
- Pity Sex
- Runnner
- Seahaven
- Shook Ones
- Sinking Ships
- Spencer Radcliffe
- The Sun Days
- Superheaven
- Temple of Angels
- The Berries
- These Days
- This Is Hell
- This Time Next Year
- Tigers Jaw
- Title Fight
- The Tower and the Fool
- Transit
- Valley Palace
- Varsity
- Vinnie Caruana
- waveform*
- Westkust
- Whirr
- Young Statues
