= Are We All Angels =

Studio album by Scowl
- Released: April 4, 2025
- Recorded: 2024
- Studio: Studio 4 (Conshohocken)
- Genres: Alternative rock; grunge; hardcore punk; pop-punk
- Length: 32:51
- Label: Dead Oceans
- Producer: Will Yip

Scowl chronology
Psychic Dance Routine (2023)	Are We All Angels (2025)

Singles from Are We All Angels
- 1. "Special" Released: October 8, 2024; 2. "Not Hell, Not Heaven" Released: January 21, 2025; 3. "B.A.B.E" Released: February 11, 2025; 4. "Tonight (I'm Afraid)" Released: March 4, 2025

Are We All Angels is the second studio album by the American hardcore punk band Scowl, released on April 4, 2025, by Dead Oceans. The band recorded the album with producer Will Yip at Studio 4 in Conshohocken, Pennsylvania. An alternative rock, grunge, hardcore punk and pop-punk album, Are We All Angels continues Scowl's departure from their hardcore punk roots established on their previous extended play, Psychic Dance Routine (2023). Its lyrics deal with grief, alienation, abuse, relationships, self-perception and systems of control, as well as the band's newfound fame and relationship with the hardcore community. It was Scowl's last album with guitarist Malachi Greene, who left the band in October 2025.

Are We All Angels received critical acclaim. The album was supported by four singles, "Special", "Not Heaven, Not Hell", "B.A.B.E." and "Tonight (I'm Afraid)"; Scowl performed the latter on their live television debut on The Late Show with Stephen Colbert. The band embarked on headlining tours of the United Kingdom, Europe, North America and Australia in support of the album between March and December 2025.

== Background and recording ==
In November 2021, Scowl released their debut album, How Flowers Grow, through Flatspot Records. The album proved be the band's breakout release, and they supported it with two years of constant touring. In 2023, Scowl released their second extended play, Psychic Dance Routine and made touring guitarist Mikey Bifolco, whose house they stayed at during its recording, a permanent member. That year, Scowl experienced a mixture of personal and emotional turmoil that year due to their grueling touring schedule; vocalist Kat Moss frequently experienced health issues and became disassociated from her (Note: Moss uses she/they pronouns; this article uses she/her pronouns for consistency.) body and experiences during this time. Scowl also faced rejection from the online hardcore community and were accused of selling out and being an industry plant after playing a show sponsored by Taco Bell; Moss's appearance and abilities were frequently scrutinized, and the resulting feelings of isolation contributed to band tensions.

In 2024, Scowl spent a month and a half recording Are We All Angels with producer Will Yip at Studio 4 Recording in Conshohocken, Pennsylvania. Bassist Bailely Lupo said the album's writing process was the band's most collaborative to date, with all members bringing in their own influences. Moss said that Scowl aimed to experiment with melody and harmony in the studio and show off their greater musicianship, though they did not know how melodic their songs would get at the time. She said the band were initially wary of how they would be perceived due to the genre-bending nature of their songs, but eventually realised it "doesn't really change anything about who we are and what we're doing". Moss drew additional influence from Billie Eilish, Radiohead, Car Seat Headrest to Julien Baker; she and Yip shared similar tastes in pop music and spent time together discussing vocal production, Nigel Godrich and Eilish.

== Composition ==
Are We All Angels has been described as alternative rock, grunge, pop-punk, and hardcore punk. The album continues Scowl's departure from their hardcore punk roots established on Psychic Dance Routine and displays a broader range of influences and styles, including emo, shoegaze, indie rock, and riot grrrl. Moss predominantly uses clean singing alongside screaming, and often alternates between styles during songs. The album's lyrics deal with topics such as grief, alienation, abuse, relationships, self-perception, and systems of control such as gaslighting, governments and capitalism. They also address Scowl's newfound fame and relationship with the hardcore community, though were not intended as a response to their critics. Paula Mejula of NPR described the lyrics as "body horror-imbued". Julie River of New Noise Magazine said the lyrics became more "poetic and figurative" after "Not Hell, Not Heaven". In an interview with The Fader, Moss said that the album's title was intended to highlight people's lack of control over their narrative in both a personal and socio-political context and that "nobody is a perfect victim"; its lack of a question mark was meant to keep it open ended.

The opening track of Are We All Angels, "Special", begins with pounding drums and loud guitars and maintains a "threatening" vibe throughout, according to Steffen Eggert of laut.de. The song's lyrics reflect Moss's insecurities over being perceived by others and subsequent feelings of wanting to self-sabotage. "B.A.B.E." ("Burned at Both Ends") recounts Moss's experiences of bodily disassociation during Scowl's 2023 tour with Militarie Gun and MSPAINT and the band described as a "mature version" of the Psychic Dance Routine track "Shot Down". Kerrang!'s Nick Ruskell called it a "mix of melody and chainsaw guitar". The song begins with hardcore punk verses, with Moss initially shouting before adopting softer vocal cadences, that transition to melodic choruses. "Fantasy" reflects Moss's feelings of alienation from the hardcore community. The "power pop-tinged" "Not Hell, Not Heaven" is about being trapped in "the angry part of grief", recognizing one's power and refusing to identify as a victim despite being victimized. Moss was inspired by her daily walks by the ocean and made it the song's central metaphor, which she juxtaposed against the "very painful and tumultuous" love detailed within and poetry about "love for nature". "Tonight (I'm Afraid)" features alternating tempos and opens with an "angular" bassline contrasting with thick guitar chords. Its lyrics describe the lengths and consequent harms to one's wellbeing in trying to keep another person from harm, and express feelings of anxiety and regret.

"Fleshed Out" features alternating vocals and a "stop-start" riff, and details feelings of shame over suffering from anxiety and panic attacks. Scowl originally intended the song to read as a palindrome. "Let You Down" opens with synthesizers and bird sounds before transitioning to a guitar-driven song. "Cellophane" attacks consumerism and combines melodic and hardcore elements. "Suffer the Fool (How High Are You?)" is about being trapped in a negative situation and recognizing one's power to get out of it; Steve Loftin of The Line of Best Fit described the track as recalling 2000s pop-punk with its "chugging euphoria". Moss said "Haunted" was the hardest track to write for Are We All Angels, citing her intent to let emotion shape interpretation. Rivers described the song's pacing as ballad-like and highlighted its themes of "devotion and obsession". Jem Aswad of Variety considered the album's closing title track to be amongst Scowl's "all-time most aggressive material". The song plays out relentlessly before falling into "swelling noise" and ending with acapella vocals from Moss, who called it "a desperate battle cry for people to recognize and understand the power within themselves."

== Release and promotion ==
On October 8, 2024, Scowl released the lead single from Are We All Angels, "Special", and announced their signing to Dead Oceans; they were the first hardcore act to sign to the label. On January 21, 2025, the band announced the album and released the single "Not Hell, Not Heaven". Following the release of two further singles, "B.A.B.E." and "Tonight (I'm Afraid)", the band released the album on April 4, 2025. A music video for "Fantasy" was released the same day. On April 9, Scowl made their live television debut performing "Tonight (I'm Afraid)" on The Late Show with Stephen Colbert. Between March 1 and April 6, 2025, Scowl toured North America supporting Movements. In May 2025, the band embarked on a headlining tour of the United Kingdom and Europe. From July 16 to August 1, Scowl embarked on a headlining tour of North America. On October 1, 2025, guitarist Malachi Greene announced he had left Scowl to focus on other endeavors. In November and December 2025, Scowl embarked on their debut Australian headlining tour.

== Critical reception ==
Professional ratings
Aggregate scores
Source	Rating
Metacritic	82/100
Review scores
Source	Rating
AllMusic	4/5 stars
Clash	8/10
DIY	4/5 stars
Dork	5/5 stars
Kerrang!	5/5
The Line of Best Fit	8/10
New Noise Magazine	4.5/5 stars
PopMatters	7/10
The Skinny	3/5 stars
Sputnikmusic	3.2/5

On the review aggregator website Metacritic, Are We All Angels holds a score of 82 out of 100, based on eleven reviews, indicating "universal acclaim".

== Track listing ==
All tracks are written by Scowl.

No.	Title	Length
1.	"Special"	2:57
2.	"B.A.B.E."	2:33
3.	"Fantasy"	3:29
4.	"Not Hell, Not Heaven"	3:01
5.	"Tonight (I'm Afraid)"	3:25
6.	"Fleshed Out"	2:22
7.	"Let You Down"	3:16
8.	"Cellophane"	2:23
9.	"Suffer the Fool (How High Are You?)"	3:15
10.	"Haunted"	3:16
11.	"Are We All Angels"	2:48
Total length:		32:51

Notes

- "B.A.B.E." is an acronym for "Burned at Both Ends".

== Personnel ==
Adapted from liner notes.

Scowl
- Kat Moss - vocals
- Malachi Greene - guitar
- Mikey Bifolco - guitar
- Bailey Lupo - bass
- Cole Gilbert - drums

Artwork

- Nick Scott - art direction
- Julia Fletcher - design
Production
- Will Yip - production, recording
- Josh Fernandez - additional engineering
- Justin Bartlett - additional engineering
- Phil Odon - additional vocal engineering
- Dan Burke - additional vocal engineering
- Rich Costey - mixing
- Howie Weinberg - mastering
- Will Borza - mastering

== Charts ==
Chart performance for Are We All Angels
Chart (2025)	Peak position
UK Album Downloads (Official Charts)	40
UK Independent Albums (Official Charts)	49
UK Rock & Metal Albums (Official Charts)	28
