= The Co Founder =

American emo band

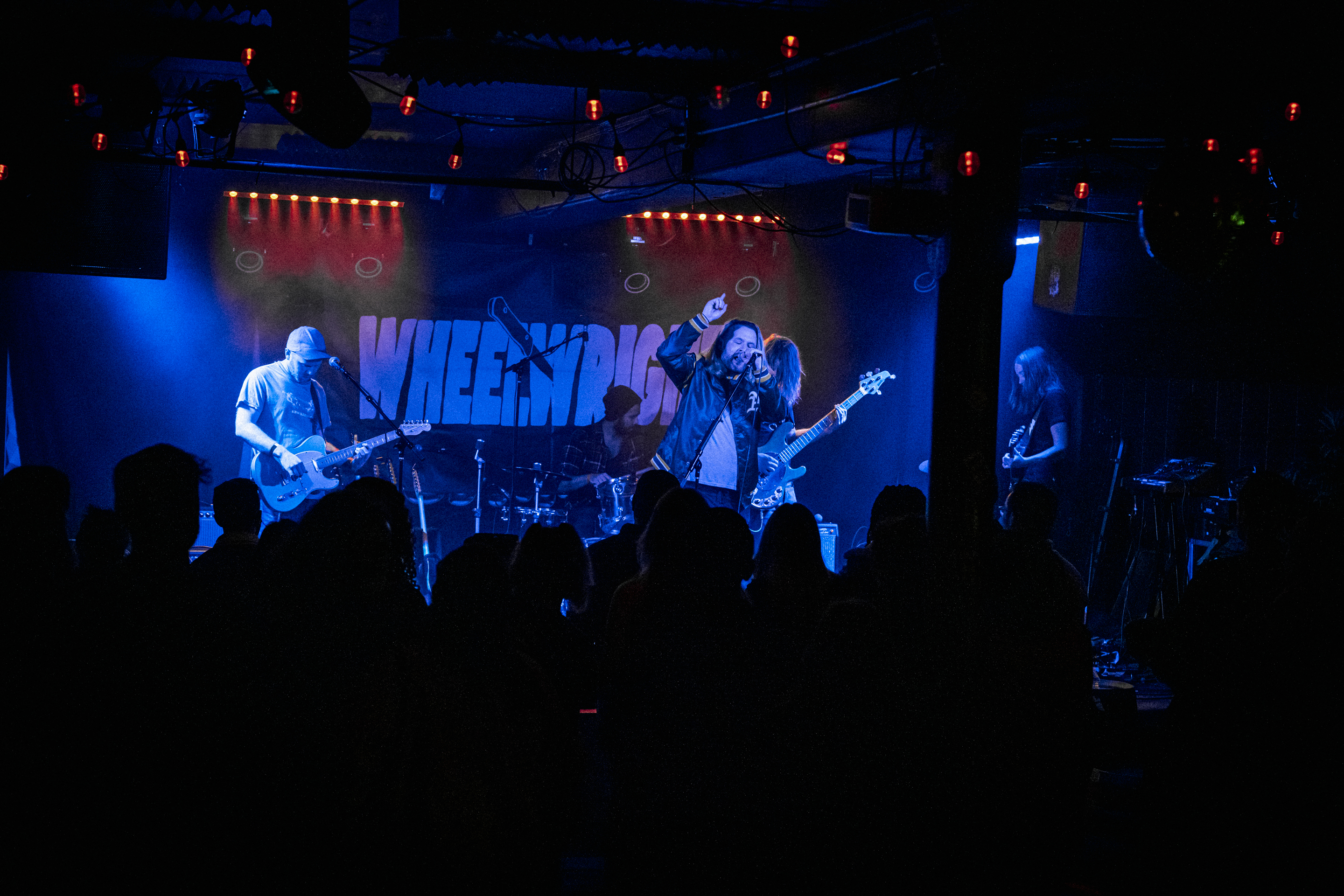
- (Photo by Christine La) The Co Founder at Neck of The Woods in San Francisco (CA)

Background information
- Origin: Oakland, California
- Genres: Alternative rock; indie rock; emo
- Years active: 2015–present
- Label: Acrobat Unstable Records
- Members: Hayden Eller; Andrew Graves; Colin Frost; Ryan Tuttle; Brayan Tarazona

The Co Founder is an American emo punk band based out of Oakland, California.

== Career ==
Originally formed in 2015, the band's lineup consists of Hayden Eller (vocals, guitar), Andrew Graves (guitar), Ryan Tuttle (Guitar), Colin Frost (Bass), and Brayan Tarazona (Drums). Described by New Noise Magazine as "combin[ing] the anthemic arrangements of Manchester Orchestra, with lo-fi washed soundscapes reminiscent of The Radio Dept". the band's "infectious personality, coupled with relentless hooks and grueling tour schedule, has earned them one of the most loyal followings in DIY music." "Gaining a reputation for their relentless touring scheduling, the group has drawn comparisons to dynamic-pop acts such as Manchester Orchestra, Restorations, and Pinegrove.”

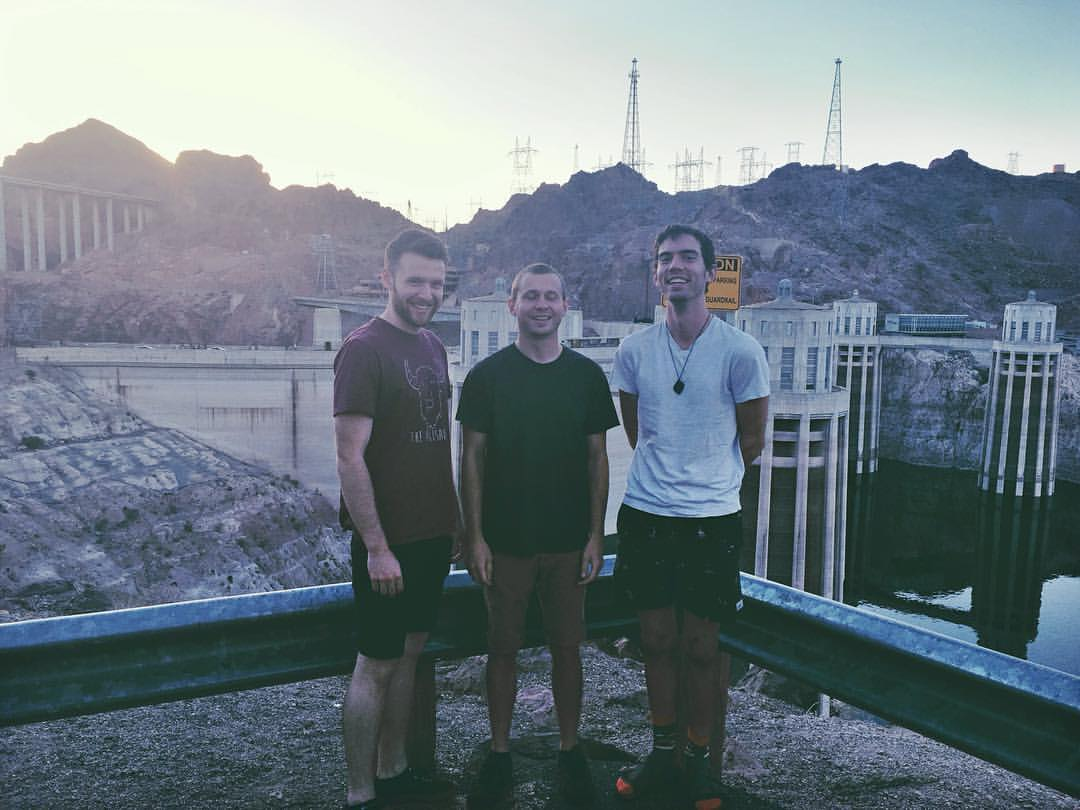
Eller (Left), Hogfoss (Center), Barrow (Right) on tour in Nevada (September 2016)

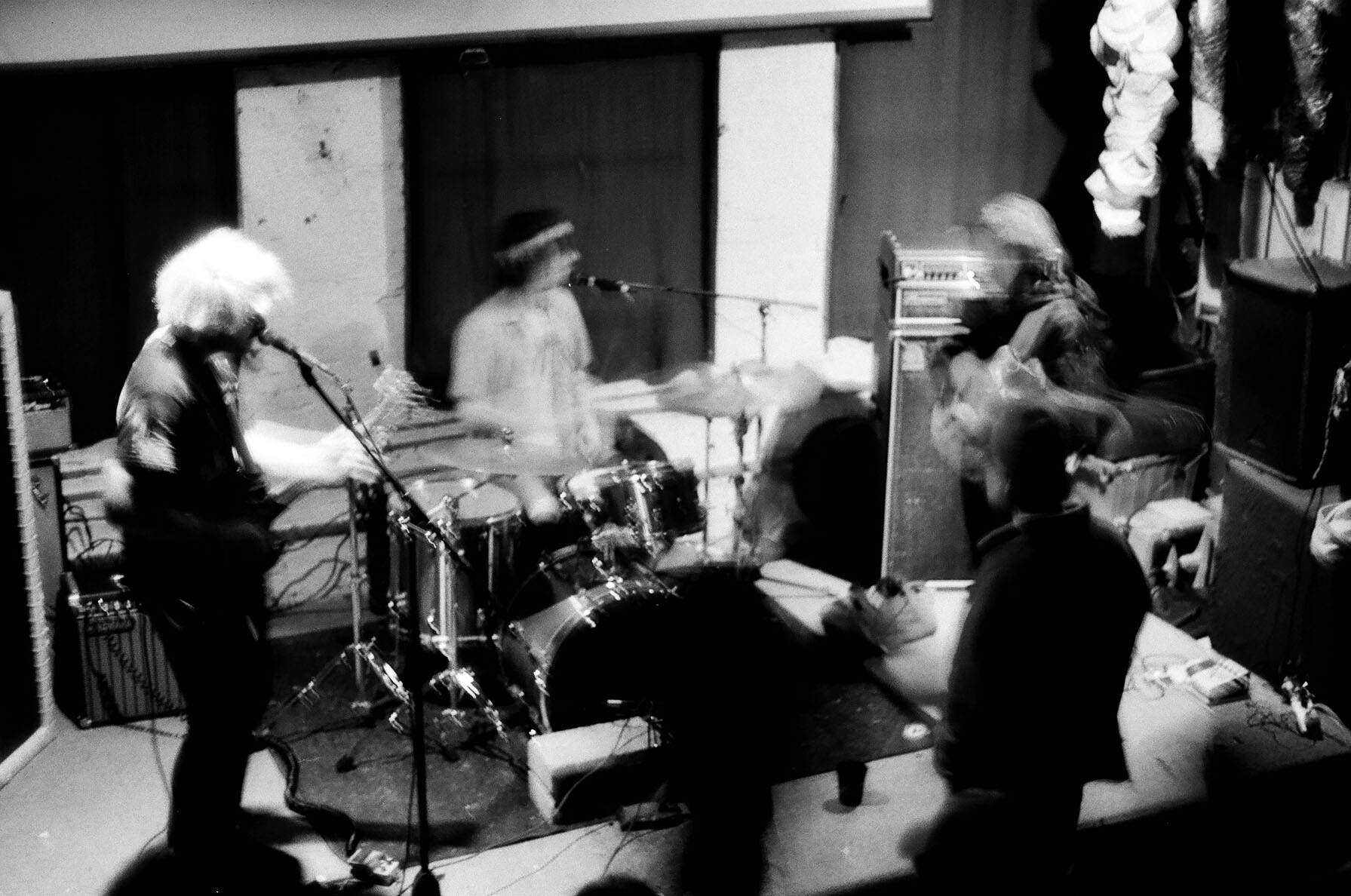
The Black Lodge, Seattle (WA) - Sunday, March 25th (2018)

The band's debut album, Wye, premiered on September 8, 2016, by Do206. Eller has been quoted describing the recording process behind 'Wye', stating "I just wanted to focus on writing really simple pop songs for this album, so when I was writing the initial demos I tried to strip as much away as I could. I wanted to see what the result would be if we stuck to an ideal that each song needed to be similar to that Nirvana approach of ‘nursery rhymes on steroids. I have a soft spot for really big, anthemic, music, so (to me) Wye is an interesting juxtaposition between this stripped down three piece playing really simple songs that have pretty big choruses.”. In the same interview, original bassist Luke Hogfoss added "It was almost like watching a puzzle grow as we added in a piece here and a bassline there - Jake and I were able to bring in additions to sort of 'self-actualize' the already great music that Hayden had written.”

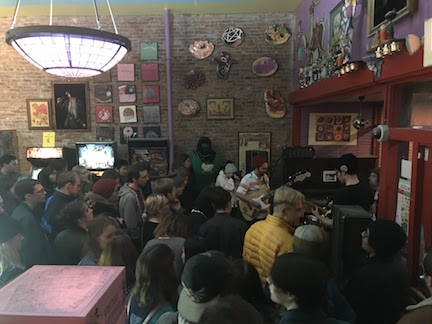
The Co Founder at Voodoo Donuts in Eugene, Oregon (November 2017)

A follow-up vinyl 7", entitled "phd", premiered on February 8, 2017, by New Noise Magazine - containing two new tracks ("Obsessed", "Balance"), New Noise praised the release as "a marked step forward, both in terms of songwriting and production quality." "phd" (an acronym for "perfectly hidden depression") has been hailed by Impose Magazine as "a share-worthy production, almost certain to attract both the melodic pop-seekers of everyday life and the obscurity-lovers who naturally find their way to incredible music like this first. 5/5."

In a November 2017 interview with Electric Daze Magazine previous bandmember Nikko Van Wyck was quoted saying that the songs on gymnasium are "more dynamic, less folk and a lot more emphasis on bass and rhythm." Eller has gone on to explain that "the majority of it ["gymnasium"] last May, with Luke, over two or three weeks and have been steadily chipping away at the production process since then."

"Full Stop", the debut single off "gymnasium" was released via The Grey Estates. The Grey Estates praised the release as "endearing borderline alt-country moments are overpowered by the grandiose sounds of reverb fueled power chords that fill the room. Over it all sit simplistic, poetic-esq lyrics that are just melodramatic enough to fit the mood". Seattle Music Insider lauded the tracks dynamic volume shifts and emotional performances, stating "as the track crescendos one final time, each instrument remains controlled; this, as it seems, is one of the strongest tools in The Co Founder’s toolbox, in that they have an impeccable ability to remain together and tight, no matter how loud or soft they wish to be." A music video for Full Stop was released shortly after the single's initial premiere - hosted by Atwood Magazine, the video depicts an 8bit dinosaur attempting to maneuver the difficulties of "DIY Tour Runner", a fictitious arcade game created by the band in an effort to illustrate the lyrical content of Full Stop. In March 2018 the band made their first appearance at Austin, TX's South by Southwest Music Festival, performing at South by Hikes Fest on March 14.

In early April 2018 the band announced plans for their first Full US tour, to be followed by their first string of international tour dates - a 10-day tour of Japan.

"Quarter Mile", the third and final single from "gymnasium" was released July 12 via New Noise Magazine - speaking to the lyrical content, Eller is quoted as saying "Lyrically, ‘Quarter Mile’ centers around my struggles with depression/suicidal ideation. Mental health has been an ongoing battle for me since I was 15–16, and the song is meant to speak to that back and forth – feeling okay one day, and stuck in a hole on the next."

The band completed their first full US tour in October 2018, consisting of 35 shows in 40 days, spanning over 27 states.

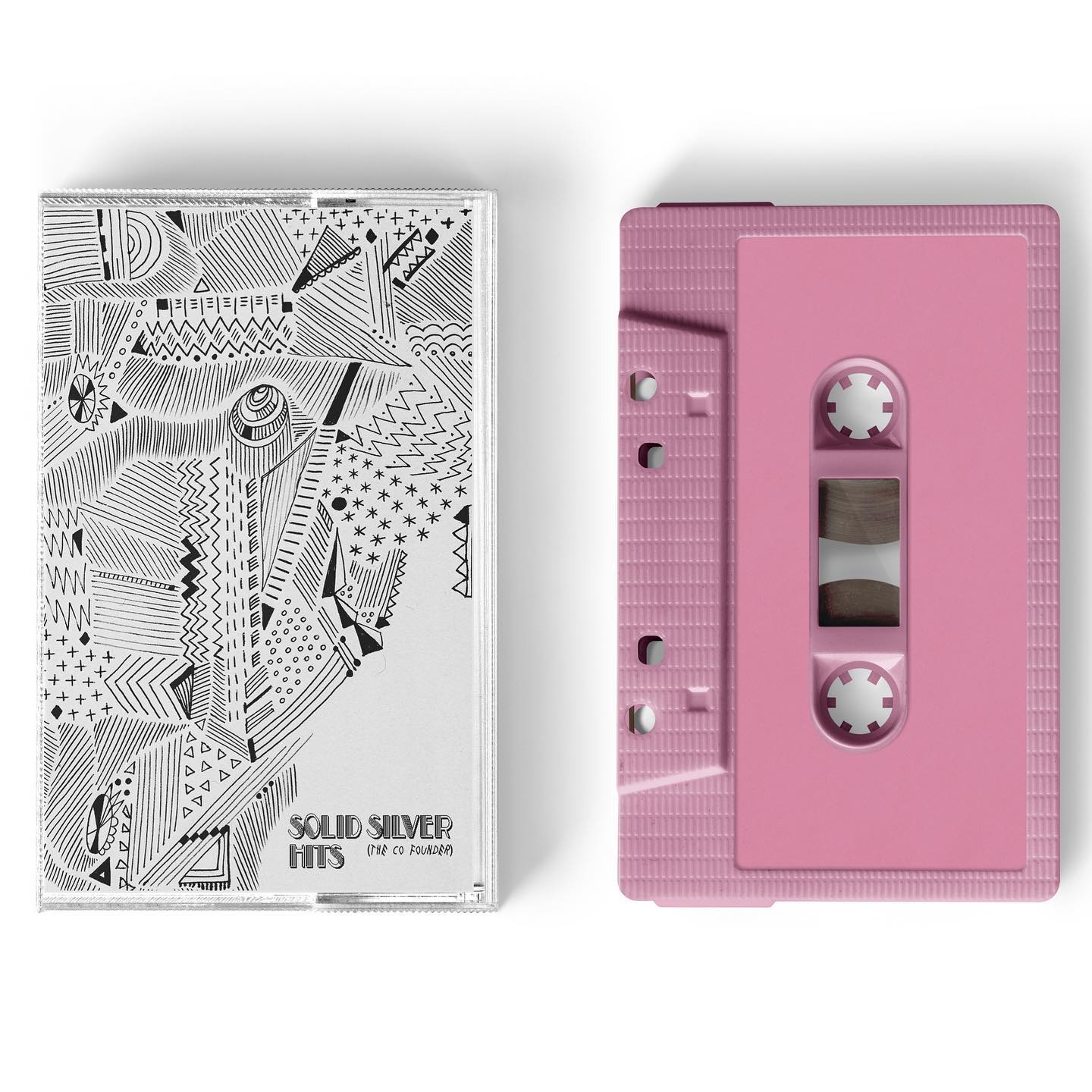
Solid Silver Hits Cassette Layout

In December 2018 the band announced their full Japan tour schedule, consisting of 10 shows across the Tokyo metropolitan area, along with their intent to record a 4 song EP in Ellijay (GA) in March 2019. While the band originally intended to record four songs, Solid Silver Hits was released on December 4th, 2020 as a two track single. All proceeds from the release are being donated to Fair Fight, a voting rights organization based out of Atlanta, Georgia.

On August 16, 2022 The Co Founder announced their reformation, and the addition of new guitarist Andrew Graves, via Instagram. The band re-released their sophomore album, Gymnasium, on December 8th, 2022 through a premiere on ChorusFM. Speaking about Full Stop, Eller commented " This song is about the emotions that come with being a DIY touring musician. Specifically the difficulty that comes with self promoting and the fraudulent feelings that come with that. Trying to hype up your fan base while dealing with the realities of independent touring." The re-release announcement included acknowledgement of the band working on new material, with plans to record with Jordan Krimston (Oso Oso, Weatherbox) in early 2023.

On March 22, 2024 "Shoes For Runners", featuring Jordan Pundik of New Found Glory, was released via Acrobat Unstable Records. As part of the Brooklyn Vegan single premiere the band announced the upcoming release of their third studio album, "Never Miss A Good Opportunity To Shut The Fuck Up", produced by Jordan Krimston (Oso Oso) and engineered by Daniel Charlson. A music video was released alongside the single, filmed at Trona Pinnacles and directed by Ryan Tuttle. Brooklyn Vegan describes "Shoes for Runners" as "(sounding) a little like a punkier Gin Blossoms", while Eller was quoted as saying "Making Never Miss A Good Opportunity To Shut The Fuck Up was the most cathartic experience we have had as a unit since the band’s inception." As part of an interview with Graves and Eller, UK blog Ten of Clubs described NMAGOTSTFU as "shot through with diverse musical influences, somehow succeed(ing) at being both edgy and nostalgic in a way that keeps you coming back for more." As part of the same interview Graves disclosed that the band did not originally plan to record a full album; "We actually didn’t plan to record an entire record. Our intention was to record a couple of singles and to put them out to get back in the swing of releasing music. We had so much fun, we figured we’d record a few more to make an EP. Then we realised a full record was inevitable."

== Influences ==
Eller has cited Militarie Gun, Webbed Wing, Tom Petty, Cola Boyy, Luke Hogfoss, Third Eye Blind, Manchester Orchestra, Queens of the Stone Age and Tracy Chapman as influences.

Graves cites Julien Baker, Laura Stevenson, and local Oakland record label Slang Church as his biggest influences.

== Band members ==
Current

- Hayden Eller – vocals, guitar (2015–Present)
- Andrew Graves - Guitar (2023–Present)
- Ryan Tuttle - Guitar (2024)
- Colin Frost - Bass (2024)
- Brayan Tarazona - Drums (2024)

Past

- Nikko Van Wyck – bass guitar (2017– 2019)
- Jake Barrow – drums, percussion, vocals (2016–2019)
- Luke Hogfoss – guitar, bass guitar, vocals (September 2016-August 2017 // August 2018 – 2019)

== Music videos ==
Shoes For Runners

- Released March 22, 2024
- Concept/Directed - Ryan Tuttle
- Production/Editing - Ryan Tuttle
- From "Never Miss A Good Opportunity To Shut The Fuck Up" (May 17, 2024)

Sink/Swim

- Released December 14, 2018
- Concept/Directed - The Co Founder
- Production/Editing - Hayden Eller
- From "gymnasium" (August 2, 2018)

Already Know

- Premiered via Pfluff on June 14, 2018
- Concept/Directed/Edited by Hayden Eller
- Featuring animation from Pokémon Red Version "Pokemon Red Version"
- From "gymnasium" (August 2, 2018)

Full Stop

- Premiered via Atwood Magazine on February 1, 2018
- Concept by Hayden Eller
- Directed/Edited by Hayden Eller
- Production by Hayden Eller and Jake Barrow
- Featuring 8bit Dinosaur from Google Chrome's "Dino Run"
- From "gymnasium" (August 2, 2018)

Lullaby

- Concept/Directed/Edited by Hayden Eller
- Footage by Jake Barrow
- From "gymnasium" (August 2, 2018)

== Discography ==
=== Studio albums ===
- Never Miss A Good Opportunity To Shut The Fuck Up (May 17, 2024)

All tracks are written by The Co Founder. Details taken from original Bandcamp release.

No.	Title	Length
1.	"I've Been Alone"	2:28
2.	"Shoes For Runners"	2:39
3.	"Bedroom Window"	3:02
4.	"Chump"	3:09
5.	"It's Mine (Forget It)"	3:19
6.	"Bayview Dream"	3:11
7.	"Creative Adults"	3:20
8.	"Wasted Honor"	3:45
9.	"The Meds Go Far"	2:58
10.	"Voices"	3:46

- gymnasium (August 6, 2018)

All tracks are written by The Co Founder. Details taken from original Bandcamp release

No.	Title	Length
1.	"Sink/Swim"	2:28
2.	"Full Stop"	2:51
3.	"Already Know"	3:02
4.	"16 Miles"	3:09
5.	"Downstairs"	3:19
6.	"Lullaby"	3:11
7.	"Stoic in Sand"	3:20
8.	"Alderwood"	3:45
9.	"Quarter Mile"	2:58
10.	"Rooftops"	3:46

- Wye (September 8, 2016)

All tracks are written by The Co Founder. Details taken from original Bandcamp release

No.	Title	Length
1.	"Intro"	1:31
2.	"Poet/Thief"	2:45
3.	"Boreal"	2:50
4.	"Tonight"	3:13
5.	"Masquerade"	3:32
6.	"Company"	2:47
7.	"A90"	3:10
8.	"Either Way"	3:07

- Hayden Eller — Production
- Tye Hastings (Tye Hastings Audio) — Engineering, Mixing
- Chris Hanzsek (Hanzsek Audio) — Mastering
- Erik Wallace (Shibusa Sound) — Additional Mixing Assistance
- Paige Heinen (@gazerlies) — Artwork (Front Cover)
- Hayden Eller — Layout, design

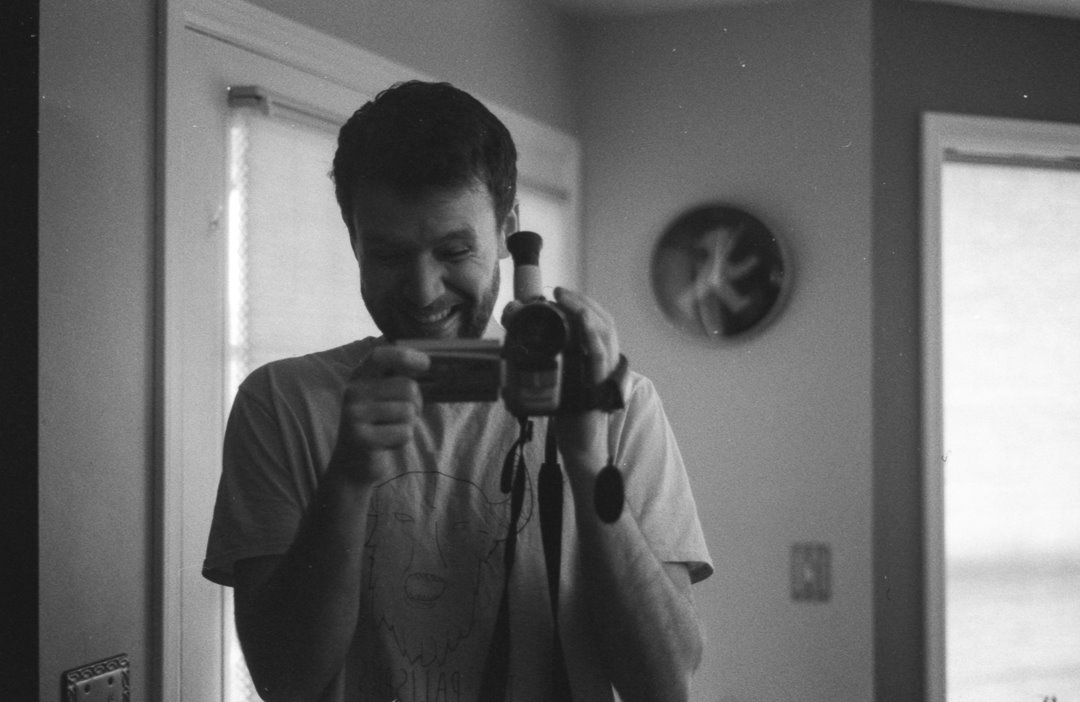
Eller during the recording of "phd"

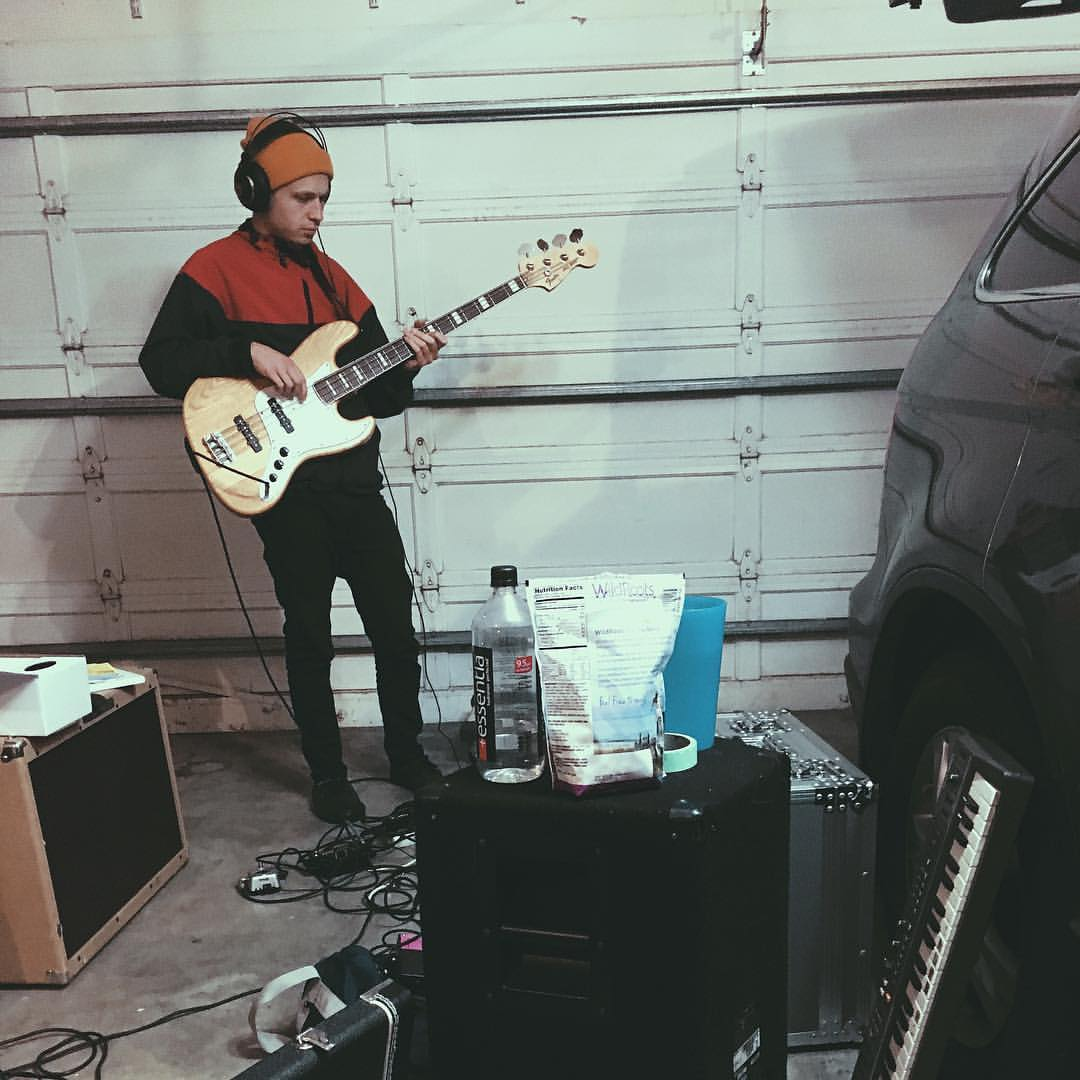
Original bassist, Luke Hogfoss, during the "phd" writing sessions

=== Singles ===
- "phd" (February 9, 2017)

All tracks are written by The Co Founder. Details taken from original Bandcamp release

No.	Title	Length
1.	"Obsessed"	3:08
2.	"Balance"	4:27

- Hayden Eller, Luke Hogfoss, Jake Barrow (The Co Founder) — Production
- Erik Wallace (Shibusa Sound) — Engineering/Mixing
- Chris Hanzsek (Hanzsek Audio) — Mastering
- Mimi Jaffe (@dr.jaffe) — Artwork

- "Solid Silver Hits" (December 4, 2020)

All tracks are written by The Co Founder. Details taken from original Bandcamp release

No.	Title	Length
1.	"Eating Alone"	3:38
2.	"Solo Beach Day"	4:39

- Hayden Eller, Luke Hogfoss, Jake Barrow (The Co Founder) — Production
- Jake Barrow — Engineering/Mixing
- Kevin Nichols — Mastering
- Hayden Eller — Artwork

== Podcast appearances ==
The Dan Cable Presents Podcast

- December 30, 2016 (Full interview with Eller, Hogfoss, and Barrow)
- November 10, 2017 (Full interview with Eller, Van Wyck, and Barrow)

== Live performance videos ==
Brunch Tunes (Acoustic)

- Location: Oakland, CA (Released July 22nd, 2018)
- Videographer - Ira Cooper Torey
- Audio - Colin Frost
- All tracks taken from "gymnasium" // All tracks written by The Co Founder
- Credits taken from original YouTube posting

The Western Sessions (Acoustic)

- Location: Western Washington University (Bellingham, WA) (Released September 10, 2016)
- Videographer - Jared Rusk
- Audio - Tye Hastings
- All tracks taken from "Wye" // All tracks written by The Co Founder
- Credits taken from original YouTube posting

The Golden Gate Sessions (Acoustic)

- Premiered on December 5, 2016 via New Noise Magazine
- Location: San Francisco, California (Golden Gate Bridge Overlook)
- Audio - Luke Hogfoss
- Videography - Lindsey Shern
- Audio/Video Editing - Hayden Eller
- Performances by - Hayden Eller (Guitar/Vocals) and Jake Barrow (Ukulele/Vocals)
- All tracks taken from "Wye" // All tracks written by The Co Founder
- Credits taken from original YouTube posting
