= No Separation =

EP by MSPaint
- Released: May 23, 2025
- Recorded: 2024
- Genre: Synth-punk
- Length: 15:43
- Label: Convulse Records
- Producers: Julian Pratt; Harlan Steed

MSPaint chronology
Post-American (2023)	No Separation (2025)

Singles from No Separation
- 1. "Angel" Released: April 29, 2025; 2. "Drift" Released: May 19, 2025

No Separation is the second extended play by American punk rock band, MSPaint. The extended play was released on May 23, 2025 through Convulse Records.

== Background ==
=== Writing and recording process ===
No Separation, was produced by Julian Cashwan Pratt and Harlan Steed of Show Me the Body. According to the band writing process reflected the band's evolving relationship with the hardcore scene—one they initially had little direct connection with but gradually absorbed through touring with groups like Scowl and Militarie Gun. While MSPaint never set out to write traditional hardcore music, the band consciously incorporated heavier sonic elements after experiencing how audiences engaged with breakdowns and mosh parts during live shows, in the writing process of the EP.

Most songs on No Separation began with synth and bass sketches crafted by band member Nick Panella, with the band collaboratively shaping them into finished tracks. The band deliberately experimented with incorporating "heavy" moments, though often filtered through their unique instrumentation, leading to compositions that gestured toward hardcore tropes without fully replicating them. Vocalist DeeDee noted that even attempts to write straightforward or subdued songs would inevitably become distorted by the band's unusual sonic palette, turning a simple note or effect into a harsh, idiosyncratic centerpiece.

Pratt, during the production phase, reassured the band that their idiosyncratic approach—using synths instead of guitars, drum machines augmented with hardware attachments, and an outsider's understanding of genre conventions—wasn't a detriment but a strength. The band embraced this, acknowledging that while their gear setup and songwriting process could be convoluted, their off-kilter aesthetic was foundational to their identity. As DeeDee put it, MSPaint songs undergo a kind of "funnel" effect, where conventional ideas pass through the band's experimental framework and emerge in unpredictable and warped forms.

=== Singles and music videos ===
The first single released ahead of the EP was the song "Angel", which was released on April 29, 2025. The second, and final single, "Drift", was released on May 19, 2025, shortly before the EP was released.

== Critical reception ==
Professional ratings
Review scores
Source	Rating
Lambgoat	7/10
Pitchfork	7.7/10
Treble	4/5 stars

The EP was well-received by contemporary music critics. Writing for Pitchfork, Nina Corcoran gave the album a 7.7 out of 10. Cocoran said, of the album, that "the Mississippi band accentuates its flirtations with industrial music on an urgent, synth-punk call-to-arms that posits positivity and community as a bulwark against the world's harms."

== Track listing ==
All lyrics are written by Nick Panella; all music is composed by Panella, Quinn Mackey, Randy Riley, and DeeDee.

No Separation track listing
No.	Title	Length
1.	"Drift"	2:41
2.	"Wildfire"	2:57
3.	"Surveillance"	3:23
4.	"No Separation"	2:56
5.	"Angel"	3:46
Total length:		15:43
