= God Save the Gun =

Studio album by Militarie Gun
- Released: October 17, 2025
- Recorded: 2024–2025
- Genre: Melodic hardcore; post-hardcore
- Length: 37:35
- Language: English
- Label: Loma Vista
- Producer: Riley MacIntyre; Ian Shelton

Militarie Gun chronology
Life Under the Gun (2023)	God Save the Gun (2025)

Singles from God Save the Gun
- 1. "I Thought You Were Waving" Released: July 16, 2024; 2. "Bad Idea" Released: August 13, 2025; 3. "Throw Me Away" Released: September 10, 2025; 4. "God Owes Me Money" Released: October 13, 2025

God Save the Gun is the second studio album by American hardcore punk group Militarie Gun. The album was released on October 17, 2025, through Loma Vista Recordings.

Four singles were released ahead of the album's release: "Thought You Were Waving", "Bad Idea", "Throw Me Away", and "God Owes Me Money".

== Background and recording ==
Shortly after the release of the band's 2023 debut album, Life Under the Gun, Militarie Gun began working on the writing for a second album, described by frontman, Ian Shelton, as being written with a sense of introspection and urgency. Shelton had shared with Rock Sound magazine that much of the material for God Save the Gun was written prior to the release of Life Under the Gun. Shelton noted that by having much of the lyrics written for the second album that far in advance gave the band a head-start and a more relaxed mindset about what they needed to accomplish during recording and composing the album itself. In the interview with Rock Sound, Shelton further emphasized that the band took their time writing and putting together God Save the Gun, noting that the band spent three years writing this record in particular, which he believed allowed for more songwriting space, rehearsal and band-arrangement than on their previous record.

Writing for the album spanned from late 2023 through early 2025, with the first round of demos being recorded for the album in late 2024. Militarie Gun wrote about 20 to 25 songs before recording in late 2024 and early 2025, but cut "as many as six songs" during record sessions. There was no one single recording session as it spanned across several months in 2024 and 2025. During the recording process, the band brought in Riley MacIntyre to produce the album.

== Style and composition ==
The album has been described by music critics primarily as a post-hardcore and melodic hardcore album, with some influences of alternative rock and pop-punk.

== Release and promotion ==
=== Singles ===
There were four singles released ahead of the album: "Thought You Were Waving", "Bad Idea", "Throw Me Away", and "God Owes Money". The lead single, "Thought You Were Waving", was released about a year prior to the album's released, on July 16, 2024; and before the album announcement. Musicially, "Thought You Were Waving" received mixed reviews initially from critics, although some critics praised the tongue-in-cheek humor of the song.

The second single, "Bad Idea" (stylized as "B A D I D E A") was released on August 12, 2025, and coincided with the album's announcement. Following the August 2025 album announcement, the singles "Throw Me Away" were released in September, while "God Owes Me Money" was released on October 13, 2025, four days before the album's release.

=== Music videos ===
There were three music videos released to accompany the lead three singles of God Save the Gun: "Thought You Were Waving", "Bad Idea", and "Throw Me Away". The music video for "Thought You Were Waving" was released on July 16, 2024, and was directed by Neta Ben Ezra and produced by Lauren Starr Barlow. The music video features members of Militarie standing naively as murders, thieves, and arsonists wreak havoc around them.

== Critical reception ==
Professional ratings
Aggregate scores
Source	Rating
AnyDecentMusic?	8.0/10
Metacritic	85/100
Review scores
Source	Rating
Classic Rock	7/10 stars
Clash	8/10 stars
DIY	4.5/5 stars
Exclaim!	7/10
Kerrang!	4/5 stars
The Line of Best Fit	9/10
musicOMH	4/5 stars
NME	4/5 stars
Paste	8.5/10
Under the Radar	8.5/10 stars

Upon release, God Save the Gun was met with critical acclaim by contemporary music critics. On review aggregator website, Metacritic, God Save the Gun has an average rating of 85 out of 100 indicating "universal acclaim" based on 11 critic reviews. Review aggregator, AnyDecentMusic? has an average rating of 8.0 out of 10 based on nine critic reviews.

Caleb Campbell, writing for Under the Radar praised the album for its potential crossover appeal and felt it was stronger than their previous effort, Life Under the Gun. Of the album Campbell said, "[the album] feels universal and uniting in the way the best records often do. It is an invitation for all those who have caught themselves feeling like burning their life down to release those feelings together, transmuting that negativity into something vital and deeply cathartic." Campbell awarded the album an 8.5/10.

Also giving the album exceptional praise included Ben Tipple, writing for DIY; and Joshua Mills, writing for The Line of Best Fit. Both Tipple and Mills nearly gave God Save the Gun perfect scores. Tipple, in summation, described 'God Saves the Gun' as "brutally difficult as it is cathartic." Tipple further said the album reveals "hard-fought glimmers of hope in the pain he concludes, breaking into tears) prove the very point of the record." Mills discusses that the album leaving the listen "left with plenty to mull over but, equally importantly, a great desire to hear those ginormous hooks all over again."

Kerrang! writer, Emma Wilkes praised the album, believing it has the capability of being their signature album, awarding the album four stars out of five. Describing the lyricism and songwriting by Ian Shelton on the album, Wilkes says that God Save the Gun is a "cavalcade of gut-punch moments [that] hit even harder thanks to just how much the Californian quintet have evolved sonically. Its hooks are somehow bigger, catchier and more consistent than ever."

In a slightly more mixed review, Marko Djurdjić, writing for Exclaim!, while giving the album a 7 out of 10, felt that the back half of the album was more uninspiring and loaded with extra filler tracks that bloated the album. Saying of these tracks, Djurdjić said "unfortunately, not every song is a winner, with a number of uninspired tracks in the second half of the record plodding along without the energy or muscle of the first." Despite this, Djurdjić did admit that "the final act is positively anthemic, with Shelton's voice and the band's booming sincerity keeping the songs from entering derivative "stadium rock" territory."

== Track listing ==
God Save the Gun track listing
No.	Title	Writer(s)	Length
1.	"Pt. II"	Ian Shelton	0:20
2.	"Bad Idea"	Shelton; Waylon Trim	1:49
3.	"Fill Me With Paint"	Shelton; James Goodson	2:35
4.	"Throw Me Away"	Shelton; Lil Aaron; Phillip Odom	3:11
5.	"God Owes Me Money"	Shelton; Odom; Nick Panella	3:21
6.	"Daydream"	Shelton	2:50
7.	"Maybe I'll Burn My Life Down"	Shelton; Odom	2:32
8.	"Kick"	Shelton; Goodson	3:49
9.	"Laugh at Me"	Shelton; David Kelling	2:20
10.	"Wake Up and Smile"	Shelton; Kevin Kiley; Trim	3:03
11.	"I Won't Murder Your Friend"	Shelton; Kelling; Riley MacIntyre; Odom	4:37
12.	"Isaac's Song"	Shelton; Isaac Brock	0:56
13.	"Thought You Were Waving"	Shelton; Odom	2:59
14.	"God Save the Gun"	Shelton; Kiley	3:13
Total length:			37:35

== Personnel ==
Credits adapted from Tidal.

=== Militarie Gun ===
- William Acuña – guitar (tracks 2–5, 7–11, 13, 14), keyboards (2–4), vocals (4, 5, 7, 9), percussion (7)
- Kevin Kiley – guitar (2–5, 7–11, 14), keyboards (3–11, 14), vocals (4, 5, 7, 10, 14), percussion (7)
- Ian Shelton – vocals, production (all tracks); percussion (2–5, 7–11, 14), guitar (4, 6, 7, 13), keyboards (6, 11), drum programming (8, 11)
- David Stalsworth – drums (2–11, 13, 14)
- Waylon Trim – bass guitar (2–11, 13, 14), vocals (4–8, 10, 11, 14), percussion (7), keyboards (10, 11)

=== Additional musicians ===
- Riley MacIntyre – drum programming (2, 4, 5, 7, 11), keyboards (4, 5, 8, 11, 12), guitar (5)
- James Goodson – vocals (3, 5, 8, 14); drum programming, guitar, keyboards (3, 8)
- David Kelling – vocals (4, 5, 11), percussion (7), guitar (10)
- Sean Harvey – percussion (5, 8)
- Nick Panella – keyboards (5)
- Marisa Dabice – vocals (5)
- Phillip Odom – vocals (7)
- Killing Joke – samples (8)
- Shooter Jennings – keyboards (11, 12)
- Dan Spencer – vocals (11)
- David Choe – vocals (11)
- Isaac Brock – vocals (12)
- Zach Dawes – keyboards (13)

=== Technical ===
- Riley MacIntyre – production, engineering (1–12, 14); mixing (1)
- James Goodson – production (3, 8)
- Lil Aaron – production, additional engineering (4)
- David Kelling – production (10)
- Zach Dawes – production (13)
- Cian – engineering (13)
- Phillip Odom – engineering (13), additional engineering (7)
- Nate Van Fleet – engineering assistance (2–12, 14)
- Matt Wiggins – mixing (2–12, 14)
- Dave Sardy – mixing (13)
- Ruairi O'Flaherty – mastering (1–12, 14)
- Stephen Marcussen – mastering (13)

== Charts ==
Chart performance for God Save the Gun
Chart (2025)	Peak position
US Top Current Album Sales (Billboard)	45
