= Sore Thumb =

Sore Thumb may refer to:

- Sore Thumb (rock formation), a rock spire in Greenville Valley, Antarctica
- Sore Thumb (album), a 2022 album by Oso Oso

== See also ==
- Sore Thumbs, a webcomic by Chris Crosby
