= Life Till Bones =

Studio album by Oso Oso
- Released: August 9, 2024
- Recorded: January–March 2024
- Studio: Two Worlds Studio
- Genre: Emo pop; fifth-wave emo; power pop; alternative rock; pop rock; emo
- Length: 29:14
- Label: Yunahon Entertainment LLC
- Producer: Billy Mannino

Oso Oso chronology
Sore Thumb (2022)	Life Till Bones (2024)

Life Till Bones is the fifth studio album by the American emo band Oso Oso, released on August 9, 2024. Released following the death of the band's guitarist, the lyrics largely reflect the grief and loss felt by frontman Jade Lilitri. The album met with positive critical reception and was seen as a complement to the band's previous album, Sore Thumb. Critics highlighted Life Till Bones's lyrical earnestness and philosophical content while describing the music as bright and catchy, contrasting with the album's lyrics.

== Background ==
Shortly after recording the demo versions of their 2022 album Sore Thumb, Oso Oso's guitarist, Tavish Maloney, died unexpectedly at the age of 24. A long-time musical collaborator and blood cousin of frontman Jade Lilitri, Maloney's death and Lilitri's reaction to it are continually present themes throughout the album's lyrics. Some of the songs on the album were made before the band's third studio album, Basking in the Glow, was released.

Life Till Bones was produced by Billy Mannino, a long-time collaborator of Oso Oso's, and released by the band's Yunahon Entertainment LLC record label. The album was released on August 9, 2024.

== Reception ==
Professional ratings
Review scores
Source	Rating
New Noise Magazine	4.8/5
Paste	7.9
Pitchfork	7.5
Spin	B+
Stereogum	8/9

Life Till Bones received positive reviews upon its release. Special attention was given to the tracks "All of My Love", which had been released as a single, and "Seesaw", which dealt with survivor's guilt and paid tribute to Maloney's death. Critics felt that the album was darker than the band's previous work, variously reflecting on loss, guilt, heartbreak, and mourning. Several critics compared the album favorably to the work of Phoenix.

Pitchfork's Ian Cohen gave the album a strong review, complimenting Lilitri as a "master of efficiency" and the album's heavy lyrics cast on "their breezy melodies". Cohen also praised Mannino's production, calling the work "a small, punchy rock record, a string of pearly, polished gems", but wrote that the album meets – rather than surpasses – its expectations. While he found the album to be less "explosive" than the band's earlier work, Cohen remarked that Life Till Bones is "an earnest take on mortality" and describes the effort as "one of the most celebrated songwriters of his scene making a filler-free record entirely about love and death".

Abby Jones, writing for Stereogum's album of the week article, gave resounding praise to the album. Similar to Sachler, Jones discusses the album as complement to the band's previous album, calling Sore Thumb something of a "hedonistic, disoriented" album that "harped on the crucial role of bro-ing out" which is contrasted with the sober lyricism of Life Till Bones which serves as "the harsh comedown" after Maloney's death. She further describes the lyrics as straddling the line between a pessimistic nihilism and an optimistic absurdism:

Much of life till bones concerns life's futility; even the album's title and skeleton-ridden artwork seem to imply that our mortal existence is nothing more than what happens until we die. But to Lilitri, these grisly revelations are freeing, splitting the difference between saying "fuck it, nothing matters" with a defeated sigh and saying "fuck it, nothing matters" with a satisfied grin.

Leah Weinstein of Paste also praised the album, writing: "Lilitri comes across as humble, self-aware and favorable protagonist—and that's only bolstered by just how fun and engaging the music is". Weinstein described Lilitri's writing as "intimate, fractured and grateful", while describing the music as "catchy" and "confident vocally" with a "tight power pop" element. BrooklynVegan's Andrew Sacher mirrored Weinstein's comments on the power pop elements, describing it as musically distinct from the band's emo- and punk-laden debut album. Sacher also approved of the album as a strong follow-through on the newer sound brought along by Sore Thumb and complimented the band's ability to maintain their distinct touch while experimenting with elements of different genres, calling it "Oso Oso's lightest, brightest, snappiest songs yet".

In her review of the album for New Noise Magazine, Kirstie Rouse called Lilitri a "mastermind [who] has perfected the art of creating music that is consistently great". Rouse applauded the lyrics, the contrastive musical elements, and danceability, calling the album on the whole "a groovy, painfully catchy album" and "an incredible piece of work that only Oso Oso could create". Writing for Spin, Ben Salmon wrote that Life Till Bones shows Lilitri in his best light: "Cranking out buzzy, hummable tunes that work their way into your brain and your heart in less than four minutes". Salmon described the musical quality of the album as "trying to dig a hole in a bowl full of sugar", which he said complemented the bittersweet lyrical content.

== Track listing ==
No.	Title	Length
1.	"Many Ways"	1:31
2.	"The Country Club"	2:59
3.	"All of My Love"	2:17
4.	"That's What Time Does"	3:08
5.	"Stoke"	3:36
6.	"Dog Without Its Bark"	3:19
7.	"Seesaw"	3:56
8.	"Application"	3:03
9.	"Skippy"	3:04
10.	"Other People's Stories"	2:18
Total length:		29:14
