= Death Lens =

American punk rock band

- Origin: Los Angeles, California
- Genres: Alternative rock; hardcore punk; melodic hardcore; post-hardcore; surf rock (early)
- Years active: 2011–present
- Label: Epitaph
- Members: Bryan Torres; Ernie Gutierrez; John Reyes; Tony Rangel; Seth Crescencio

Death Lens is an American melodic hardcore band based in Los Angeles.- The band formed in 2011 and is composed of Bryan Torres (vocals), Jhon Reyes (guitar, backing vocals), Tony Rangel (drums), and Ernie Gutierrez (guitar).

== History ==
The bands roots trace to East Los Angeles and La Puente, California where the band formed in 2011. The band was founded by guitarist and vocalist Bryan Torres in 2011 primarily as an instrumental surf rock project. After several lineup changes and years of experimenting with different styles, Torres rebuilt the band in 2015 with a new group of musicians committed to making Death Lens a long-term project. With that, the bands sound shifted, focusing on a more punk rock direction with lyricism that explored growing up in working-class Latino communities in Southern California.

The band's first three albums, Fuck This was independently released on April 29, 2016. (2016), Beer Up Only Club (2017), and No Luck (2022) were self-released. In 2023, the band signed a record deal with Epitaph Records, where their fourth album, Cold World, was released on May 3, 2024. The album was met with mixed and some positive reviews. Their fifth album, and second with Epitaph, What's Left Now?, was released on April 24, 2026, and was met with mixed to positive reviews.

== Discography ==
=== EPs ===
- 2011–2014 Demos (2014)
- Trashed (2016)

=== Studio albums ===
- Fuck This (2016)
- Beer Up Only Club (2017)
- No Luck (2022)
- Cold World (2024)
- What's Left Now? (2026)

=== Singles ===
- "Abrupt" (2022)
- "DAEMON" (2022)
- "Not Impressed" (2022)
- "No Luck" (2022)
- "Vacant" (2023)
- "Limousine" (2023)
- "Cold World" (2024)
- "Lo Que Sera" (2024)
- Power" (2025)
- "Monolith" (2026)
- "Drown" (2026)
- "Debt Collector" (2026)
- "Waiting to Know" (feat. Militarie Gun) (2026)
