= Zulu (band) =

American hardcore punk band

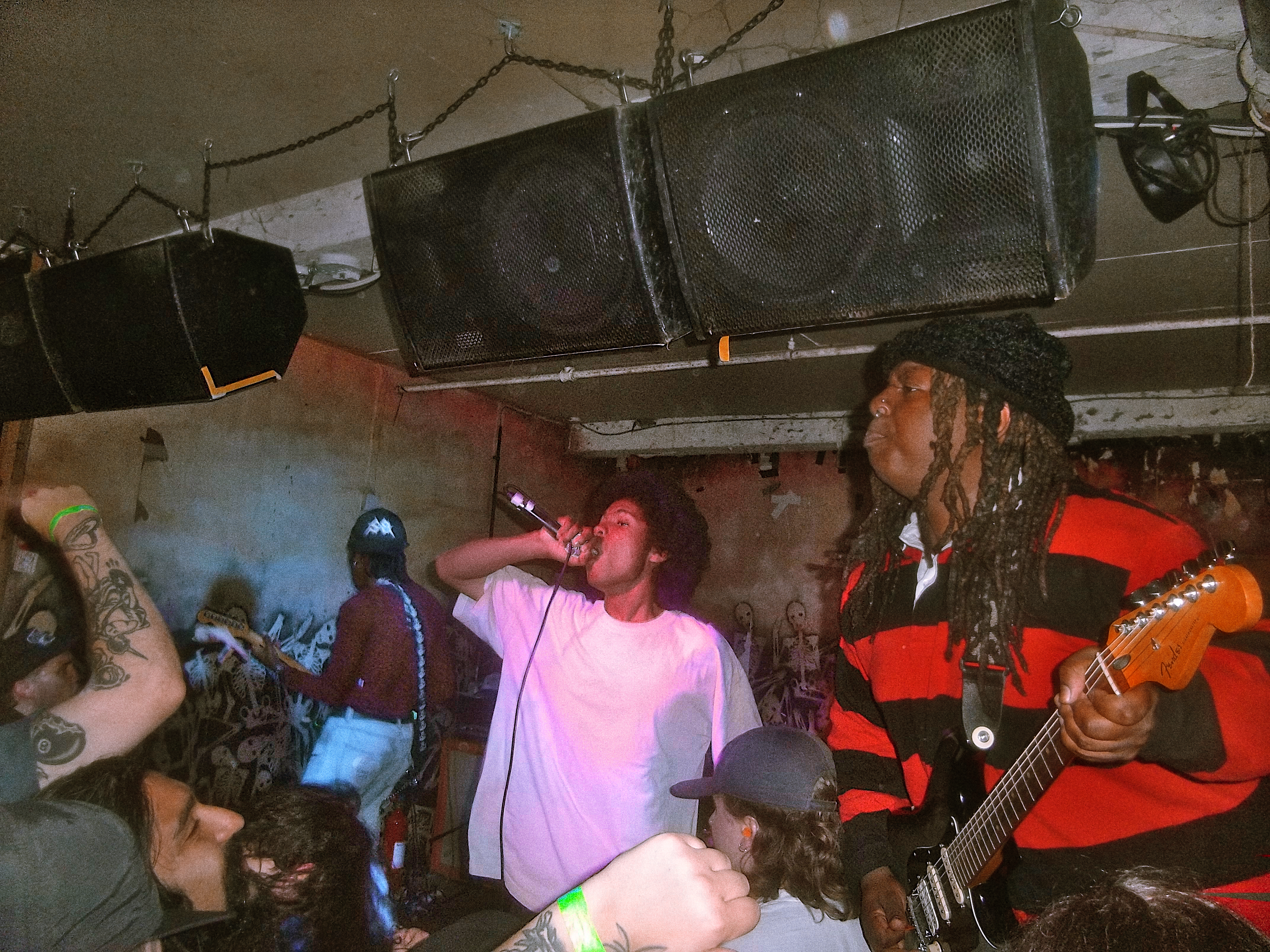
- Zulu performing in 2023

Background information
- Origin: Los Angeles, California, U.S.
- Genres: Hardcore punk; powerviolence; metalcore
- Years active: 2019–2025 (hiatus)
- Labels: Flatspot; Quality Control HQ
- Spinoff of: The Bots, Culture Abuse
- Past members: Christine Cadette; Don Brown; Anaiah Muhammad; Dez Yusuf; Braxton Marcellous; Satchel Brown
- Website: blackpowerviolence.com

Zulu was an American hardcore punk band formed in Los Angeles in 2019. In a 2023 article, Metal Hammer described them as the year's "most vital hardcore band".

Beginning as a solo project by multi–instrumentalist and principal vocalist Anaiah Muhammad, the band grew to also include Dez Yusuf (guitar), Braxton Marcellous (guitar), Christine Cadette (drums) and Satchel Brown (bass). This lineup released two EPs in addition to their 2023 debut album A New Tomorrow. In 2023, Cadette departed from the group, her role filled by Don Brown. During March 2025, allegations of domestic abuse against Muhammad led to his departure, after which the band entered a hiatus.

== History ==
Zulu was founded by Anaiah Rasheed Muhammad in 2019. Muhammed became aware of heavy music because of his father, who was involved in the Los Angeles hardcore scene in the 1970s and 1980s, and introduced him to groups like T.S.O.L. and the Adolescents. At the age of five, he had begun to learn guitar. However, he soon discovered he preferred drums. He and his older brother Mikaiah formed garage punk band the Bots in 2007, in 2016 Muhammad began drumming in straight edge hardcore band Dare and in 2018 he began playing in rock band Culture Abuse.

Muhammad began Zulu in 2019, wishing to pursue vocals in an all black hardcore band, he experimented with members including Braxton Marcellous, James Stanciell, Rob Watson, Spencer Pollard, professional skateboarder Swampy and Zoin Jakeem. However, it soon became a solo project featuring only live members. Muhammad originally intended for the band's music to be sporadic and atypical powerviolence. The band performed live twice prior to the COVID-19 lockdowns, the second of which featured Dez Yusuf on guitar, filling in for Braxton Marcellous. Following this performance both became official members. Zulu's debut EP Our Day Will Come was released on October 18, 2019, on Bandcamp. The band played then performaned in summer 2020, with Muhammad with the lineup of Christine Cadette (drums), Dez Yusuf (guitar), Braxton Marcellous (guitar) and Satchel Brown (bass). Zulu's second EP My People... Hold On was released on September 2, 2020.

On November 30, 2022, they announced the release of their debut album A New Tomorrow, and issued its lead single "Fakin' tha Funk (You Get Did)". On January 11, 2023, the album's second single "Where I'm From" was released, which featured Pierce Jordan of Soul Glo and Obioma Ugonna of Playytime. The single was accompanied by a music video which featured a cameo by Eric André. On June 14, 2023, they released a double single featuring a cover of "Wait and Bleed" by Slipknot, and a reworked version of their jazz-funk instrumental track "Shine Eternally" which features King Isis on vocals. Beginning on June 15, 2023, the band toured Europe alongside Speed. On 12 September, the band revealed in a Los Angeles Times interview that Cadette had departed.

On 8 March 2025, Anaiah Muhammad was accused of long term domestic violence by an alleged ex-girlfriend. The same day, former drummer Don Brown said Muhammad's abuse was why he was no longer in the band. The following day, the band performed in São Paulo without Muhammad, having guitarist Dez Yusuf instead take on vocal duties. On 10 March, Muhammad released a statement denying the allegations, the same day, the band cancelled their March 17 performance in San Jose, Costa Rica and March 18 performance in Mexico City. On March 11, the remaining dates of their Latin American tour were also cancelled. On 12 March, the band announced that they would be entering a hiatus, and that Muhammed was no longer a member. On 20 March, Muhammed released an additional, longer statement, refuting the allegations and claiming that he had never been in a relationship with the accuser.

== Musical style ==
The band's music has been categorised by critics as powerviolence, metallic hardcore and hardcore punk, incorporating elements of beatdown hardcore, rhythm and blues, hip hop, reggae, dub, spoken word, slam metal, death metal, retro soul, jazz-rap and funk music. Their music is based around contrasting the extreme elements of hardcore with samples and passages from black music styles like soul, jazz and reggae. Treblezine writer Tom Morgan stated their sound is based in the sound of late-1990s hardcore bands like Disembodied, as well as that of death metal and powerviolence, upon which elements of hip hop, jazz and indigenous African music are incorporated.

Zulu's lyrics discuss progressive politics, particularly black pride. On Our Day Will Come, they sample speeches by both Nina Simone and Malcolm X, and on A New Tomorrow, the track "Créme de Cassis" is an interlude featuring black poet Alesia Miller, and the album's concluding lyrics are interpolated from Bob Marley's "Small Axe". Kerrang! writer Sam Law stated that "their music marks the intersection where the current hardcore movement and the energy of Black Lives Matter thrillingly meet." In particular, the band have discussed topics including racism, disenfranchisement, racial injustice and police brutality. The band's lyrics are also informed by the gang violence in Los Angeles, Muhammad's Rastafari faith as a youth and his current Islamic faith. Stereogum writer Tom Breihan stated that their lyrics can "be angry and defiant, but it can also be celebratory."

Revolver writer Eli Enis called them "one of the heaviest bands in contemporary hardcore", and the New York Times writer Hank Shteamer stated their music is "a visionary fusion of cathartic heaviness, hip-hop flow and artfully interwoven samples from classic R&B and reggae." Metal Hammer writer Stephen Hill stated their music is "the classic sound of punk rock, hardcore and powerviolence reimagined and rebred with both the liquid grooves and righteous protest polemic of the golden era of funk and soul."

They cited influences including Weekend Nachos, Sex Prisoner, Trash Talk and Mind Eraser.

== Members ==
Current

- Dez Yusuf – guitar (2020–2025), vocals (2025)
- Braxton Marcellous – guitar (2019–2025)
- Satchel Brown – bass (2020–2025)

Former

- Christine Cadette – drums, vocals (2020–2023)
- Don Brown – drums (2023–2024)
- Anaiah Muhammad – vocals, guitar, bass, drums (2019–2025)

== Discography ==
Albums

- A New Tomorrow (2023)

EPs

- Our Day Will Come (2019)
- My People... Hold On (2020)

Singles

- "Fakin' Tha Funk (You Get Did)" (2022)
- "Where I'm From" (2023)
- "Wait and Bleed"/"Shine Eternally" (2023)
