= Regional Justice Center =

American hardcore band

- Origin: Seattle, Washington, United States
- Genres: Powerviolence; crossover thrash; hardcore punk; post-hardcore
- Years active: 2016–2024
- Label: Closed Casket
- Spinoffs: Militarie Gun
- Members: Ian Shelton; Alexandria Hickel; Che Hise-Gattone; Dan Paul; Kristin Ebeling; Matt Bertell; Steph Jerkova; Taylor Young; Vatican Voss

Regional Justice Center is an American hardcore band from Seattle, Washington. The band is named after a jail in Kent, Washington. The band has released two full-length albums and a handful of EPs. The band's first album, World of Inconvenience, was released in 2018 on Closed Casket Activities. The album was created after frontman Ian Shelton's experience with an incarcerated family member. The group's second album, Crime and Punishment, was released in 2021 on Closed Casket Activities. On September 20, 2024, the band released their third and final album titled Freedom Sweet Freedom. A large part of this records writing process was in collaboration with Ian's aforementioned family member, Max Shelton, with his stage name being Vatican Voss. Both Ian and Max wrote and performed on the album.

== Discography ==
- World of Inconvenience (2018)
- Crime and Punishment (2021)
- Freedom Sweet Freedom (2024)
