= Life Under the Gun =

Studio album by Militarie Gun
- Released: June 23, 2023
- Recorded: 2022
- Studio: Studio 606, Los Angeles, California, United States
- Genre: Alternative rock; hardcore punk; punk rock
- Length: 27:17
- Language: English
- Label: Loma Vista
- Producer: Ian Shelton; Taylor Young

Militarie Gun chronology
All Roads Lead to the Gun (2022)	Life Under the Gun (2023)	God Save the Gun (2025)

Singles from Life Under the Gun
- 1. "Do It Faster" Released: February 21, 2023; 2. "Very High" Released: April 18, 2023; 3. "Will Logic" Released: May 23, 2023

"I let everything just consume me entirely... I've never worked on something harder in my life.

—Vocalist Ian Shelton on recording Life Under the Gun

Life Under the Gun is the first full-length studio album by American hardcore punk group Militarie Gun. The release has received positive reviews from critics.

== Reception ==
Professional ratings
Aggregate scores
Source	Rating
Metacritic	80/100
Review scores
Source	Rating
DIY	4/5 stars
Exclaim!	7/10
Kerrang!	4/5 stars
The Line of Best Fit	7/10
NME	4/5 stars
Paste	8.4/10
Pitchfork	7.4/10
Rolling Stone	4/5 stars
Slant	3.5/5 stars

Life Under the Gun received positive reviews from critics noted at review aggregator Metacritic. It has a weighted average score of 80 out of 100, based on ten reviews.

Writing in a BrooklynVegan profile, Andrew Sacher calls Life Under the Gun "one of 2023’s best rock records" and states that this music debuts a "bigger, cleaner, catchier version of Militarie Gun". The Line of Best Fit's Greg Hyde gave this album a 7 out of 10, calling it a "flawed but enjoyable debut album" that has some weaknesses but is ultimately "listenable and fun". In NME, Rishi Shah gave this release 4 out of 5 stars, writing that it "transcends the limits of what hardcore can be in 2023, leading with a melodic approach that can open the wider scene up to a whole new audience". Writing for Paste, Ethan Beck scored this album an 8.4 out of 10, calling it "a relentless and infectious hardcore benchmark"; the magazine chose it as one of the best albums of June 2023. Editors at Rolling Stone stamped this album a Hear This release, with critic Brenna Ehrlich writing, "there’s really no predicting where Militarie Gun’s sound will go next over the course of the album". Slant Magazine's Steve Erickson gave this album 3.5 out of 5 stars, writing that the music is "uptempo and aggressive", but also stating "while their emotional palette may feel rooted in anger, unlike Regional Justice Center, the band’s more melodic passages strive to express it without becoming trapped by it". Editors at Stereogum chose this as Album of the Week and critic Tom Breihan calls this "a chance to stretch out and see what they could do at LP length" and compares this music to Britpop and college rock, noting "hooks within the hooks—backup-vocal harmonies or hip-shaking acoustic guitars buried in the mix with all the distorted riffage". In a June round-up of the best albums of 2023, the publication placed this at 21, with Breihan praising the songwriting hooks: "even as those choruses soar, [vocalist Ian Shelton] still growls with authority, and he’s got the best gorilla grunt in the game... the hooks are bigger, but the intensity remains... a great melody should make you want to kick a hole in a brick wall".

In June 2023, Alternative Press published an unranked list of the top 25 albums of the year to date and included this release, calling it an album that show's the band's "pop smarts" "by way of soaring highs, tight arrangements, and catchy-as-hell melodies". In a mid-year review, Rolling Stone India included this release in their best albums of 2023. Editors of Vogue included this in an unranked list of the 22 best albums of the year, published on October 23, 2023, with critic Taylor Antrim stating that the songs are "short, loud, and incredibly fun" and part of a hardcore renaissance. In November, GQ Australia editor Will Lennox listed this as 17 on the 23 best albums of 2023, calling it "an outlet for the everyman" that sucked him "into its aggressive but warming embrace". A piece by Nina Corcoran for Pitchfork chose this album to spotlight how American hardcore punk music embraced experimentation and cross-genre elements in 2023.

Life Under the Gun in best-of lists
Outlet	Listing	Rank
BrooklynVegan	BrooklynVegan's Top 55 Albums of 2023	—N/a
Exclaim!	The 50 Best Albums of 2023	42
GQ Australia	The 23 Best Albums of 2023	17
Louder Sound	Favourite Albums of 2023 (Dannii Lievers)	7
NME	The 50 Best Albums of 2023	19
The Ringer	The 27 Best Albums of 2023	10
Rolling Stone	The 100 Best Albums of 2023	51
Stereogum	The 50 Best Albums of 2023	7
Stereogum	Best Hardcore Albums of 2023	1

== Track listing ==
1. "Do It Faster" – 1:48
2. "Very High" – 1:55
3. "Will Logic" – 2:18
4. "My Friends Are Having a Hard Time" – 2:40
5. "Think Less" – 1:54
6. "Return Policy" – 2:16
7. "Seizure of Assets" – 1:53
8. "Never Fucked Up Once" – 2:20
9. "Big Disappointment" – 2:31
10. "Sway Too" – 2:54
11. "See You Around" – 2:02
12. "Life Under the Gun" – 2:46

== Personnel ==
Militarie Gun

- William Acuña – guitar
- Nick Cogan – lead guitar
- Vince Nguyen – drums
- Ian Shelton – vocals, production
- Max Epstein – bass guitar

Additional personnel

- James Goodson – harmony vocals
- Matty Morand – harmony vocals
- Mark Needham – mixing
- Philip Odom – engineering
- Taylor Young – production

== See also ==
- 2023 in American music
- List of 2023 albums
