= A New Tomorrow =

Studio album by Zulu
- Released: March 3, 2023
- Recorded: March 2022
- Studio: Los Angeles, California
- Genre: Powerviolence; metalcore
- Length: 28:46
- Language: English
- Label: Flatspot

Zulu chronology
My People... Hold On (2020)	A New Tomorrow (2023)

"It's a new tomorrow for all the people of the diaspora, hopefully to not only unite with love for each other, but for folks from the diaspora to stop hating on one another. I really hope it helps people connect."

—Vocalist Anaiah Lei on the lyrical themes of A New Tomorrow

A New Tomorrow is the only full-length studio album by American hardcore punk band Zulu, released on March 3, 2023, by Flatspot Records. It has received positive reviews from critics for the band's ability to mix various genres and moods and has appeared on several best-albums lists for 2023.

== Reception ==
Editors at Bandcamp highlighted this as Album of the Day, with staffer John Morrison writing that the music "pushes the volume and energy to the max" and the songs "celebrate the power, beauty, and resilience of Black people everywhere". Andrew Sacher of BrooklynVegan included this among the notable releases of the week, writing that while the songs "are informed by pain" the album is "so much deeper and more vast and more celebratory than that". Olly Thomas of Kerrang! rated this release a 4 out of 5, characterizing it as "a glorious celebration of black musical history and a powerful charge into its future". At The Line of Best Fit, Ims Taylor scored A New Tomorrow an 8 out of 10, calling the band "brilliant, vicious, breakneck hardcore" and this album "dark, forceful, and ready to leave you with ringing ears and shaking bones", summing up "you're left with the impression there's nothing ZULU can't do". Stephen Hill of Metal Hammer gave this release 4.5 out of 5 stars, calling it "the classic sound of punk rock, hardcore and powerviolence reimagined and rebred with both the liquid grooves and righteous protest polemic of the golden era of funk and soul" and "a wild ride, as Zulu can be destructively heavy one moment and gloriously euphoric and inventive the next". No Ripcord's Juan Edgardo Rodriguez rated A New Tomorrow an 8 out of 10, opining "there are many layers tucked within the half-hour-long A New Tomorrow, though it's the most straightforward hardcore tracks that hit the hardest". Writing for Pitchfork, Lindsay Temple rated this release a 7.8 out of 10 and stated that"the dynamic force of powerviolence isn't the loudest part of A New Tomorrow: It's the way the album juxtaposes the sludge and the shrieks with songs performed in styles popularized by Black people" and that the band "make clear that working within genre lines is far less meaningful than a commitment to the history of Black music, Black love, and Black might".

Several best-of lists published around the mid-year of 2023 included A New Tomorrow. Alternative Press included it among the top 25 on June 23, calling the blend of genres on display "a staggering effect". In a list of the 40 best albums of the year from BrooklynVegan on July 6, the blurb accompanying this release also pointed out the diversity of the lyrics and the "multi-genre" sound. The staff of Okayplayer published individual picks for the year on July 12 and senior culture and news editor Elijah Watson Sr. chose this album as his top pick of the year. Revolver's staff tallied up the 25 best of 2023 on June 14 and included this release, calling it "a monstrously heavy metallic hardcore album that simultaneously subverts so many of that genre's predictable tropes". In a ranked listing of the best albums of 2023 from June 6, editors of Stereogum placed this at 20; critic Tom Breihan stated that "when operating at peak intensity, Zulu sound like worlds exploding". Bandcamp included this among the best albums of 2023. This was rated the fourth best hardcore album of 2023 by Stereogum. Editors at Revolver ranked this the sixth best hardcore album of 2023. Editors at Loudwire included this among the 25 best rock and metal albums of 2023. Editors at BrooklynVegan included this on their list of the 55 best albums of 2023. A piece by Nina Corcoran for Pitchfork chose this album to spotlight how American hardcore punk music embraced experimentation and cross-genre elements in 2023.

== Track listing ==
All songs written by Zulu.

1. "Africa" – 1:02
2. "For Sista Humphrey" – 1:21
3. "Our Day Is Now" – 1:38
4. "Music to Driveby" – 1:27
5. "Where I'm From" – 2:21
6. "Fakin' tha Funk (You Get Did)" – 1:19
7. "Shine Eternally" – 3:02
8. "Must I Only Share My Pain" – 0:30
9. "Lyfe az a Shorty Shun B So Ruff" – 2:33
10. "From tha Gods to Earth" – 1:25
11. "Créme de Cassis by Alesia Miller & Precious Tucker" – 1:37
12. "We're More Than This" – 1:59
13. "52 Fatal Strikes" – 1:43
14. "Divine Intervention" – 2:35
15. "Who Jah Bless No One Curse" – 4:14

== Personnel ==
Zulu

- Satchel Brown – bass guitar on "Shine Eternally" and "We're More Than This", guitar on "Shine Eternally" and "We're More Than This"
- Christine Cadette – drums, vocals
- Anaiah Lei – vocals, guitar, bass guitar, drums, percussion
- Braxton Marcellous – additional guitar, piano on ""From tha Gods to Earth"
- Dez Yusuf – vocals on "We're More Than This", additional vocals on "From tha Gods to Earth" and "Who Jah Bless No One Curse"

Additional personnel

- Aisha Burns – violin arrangement on "Africa"
- Yessia Davis – additional vocals on "Africa" and "Divine Intervention"
- Pierce Jordan – vocals on "Where I'm From"
- Alesia Miller – poem on "Créme de Cassis"
- Paris Roberts – vocals on "52 Fatal Strikes"
- Zach Tuch – recording, mixing, mastering
- Precious Tucker – piano arrangement on "Africa" and "Créme de Cassis"
- Obioma Ugonna – vocals on "Where I'm From"
- Savannah Imani Wade – artwork

== See also ==
- 2023 in American music
- List of 2023 albums
