= Psychic Dance Routine =

EP by Scowl
- Released: April 7, 2023
- Genre: Alternative rock; hardcore punk; power pop
- Length: 10:22
- Language: English
- Label: Flatspot Records
- Producer: Will Yip

Scowl chronology
How Flowers Grow (2021)	Psychic Dance Routine (2023)	Are We All Angels (2025)

“I’m really excited about these songs. They’re catchier than anything we’ve ever written before, and I tried a lot of different new stuff. I’m so excited to write music with different influences, and to get even more weird with it. I’m just like, ‘OK, let’s turn it up a notch, let’s get crazier.”

—Vocalist Kat Moss on genre experimentation writing songs for Psychic Dance Routine

Psychic Dance Routine is the third extended play (EP) by American hardcore punk band Scowl, released on April 7, 2023, through Flatspot Records.

== Reception ==
Professional ratings
Review scores
Source	Rating
Distorted Sound	8/10
Kerrang!	4/5
The Line of Best Fit	9/10
New Noise Magazine	4.5/5 stars
NME	4/5 stars

Writing for Kerrang!, Emma Wilkes scored this album a 4 out of 5, noting there is experimentation in the band's hardcore punk style that allows them to "find thrilling ways to stand apart from their peers" and the result is that "these newer turns in their sound that prove most successful on the EP as well as the most enticing". In a 9 out of 10 review from Steven Loftin at The Line of Best Fit, the critic states that this release is "a stepping stone towards total domination" that displays Scowl's "ability to change shapes with a chameleonic expertise that few can pull off", which he deems "astounding". NME's Sophie Williams wrote that this is "a more polished, widescreen sound" than previous Scowl albums that shows the band "commit themselves to their big, subversive vision with total dedication".

On June 23, Alternative Press published an unranked list of the top 25 albums of the year to date and included this release, calling it "an undeniably fun and well-produced record—a delectable blend of hardcore punk and alt-rock that fans could devour whether they were head-banging in a basement or crowd surfing at Coachella". At Stereogum, James Rettig included this among the best EPs of 2023. Editors at Revolver ranked this the second best hardcore album of 2023. Editors at BrooklynVegan included this on their list of the 55 best albums of 2023. A piece by Nina Corcoran for Pitchfork chose this album to spotlight how American hardcore punk music embraced experimentation and cross-genre elements in 2023.

== Track listing ==
1. "Shot Down" – 1:49
2. "Psychic Dance Routine" – 2:49
3. "Wired" – 2:04
4. "Opening Night" – 2:07
5. "Sold Out" – 1:32

== Personnel ==
Scowl

- Mikey Bifolco – guitar
- Cole Gilbert – drums
- Malachi Greene – guitar
- Bailey Lupo – bass guitar
- Kat Moss – vocals

Additional personnel

- Justin Bartlett – additional engineering
- Alice Baxley – photography
- Annelids Parenti – additional engineering
- Vince Ratti – co-mixing
- True Colors USA – layout, art direction
- Victoria Singh Warnken – artwork
- Will Yip – percussion, engineering, mixing, production, mastering

== See also ==
- 2023 in American music
- List of 2023 albums
