= Militarie Gun =

American punk rock band

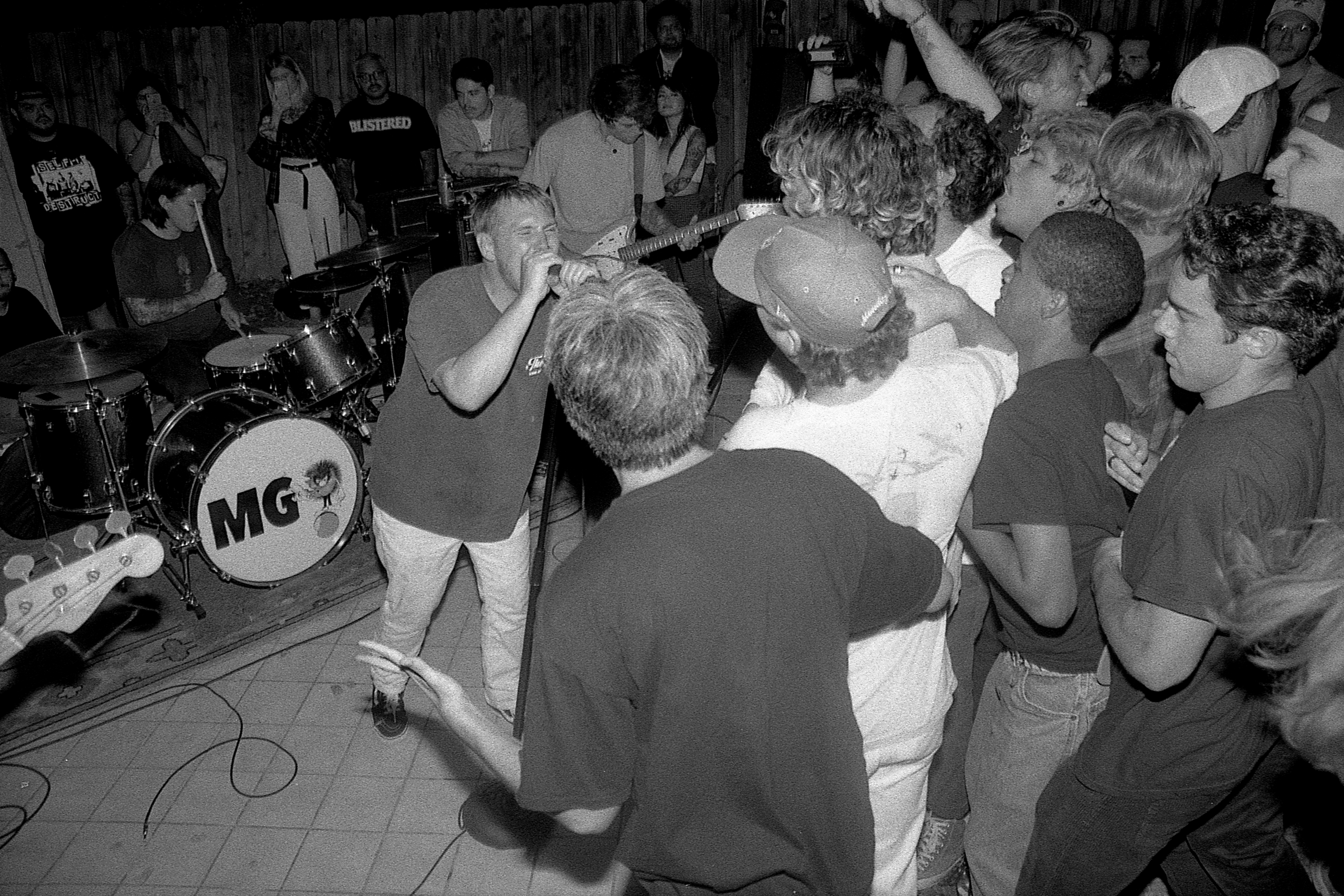
- Militarie Gun's first live performance in Oceanside, California

Background information
- Origin: Los Angeles, California Seattle, Washington; United States
- Genres: Alternative rock; hardcore punk; melodic hardcore; post-hardcore
- Years active: 2020–present
- Labels: Loma Vista; Convulse Records; Alternatives Label
- Spinoffs: Car Underwater
- Spinoff of: Regional Justice Center; Drug Church; Modern Color; LURK
- Members: Ian Shelton; William Acuña; Waylon Trim; David Stalsworth; Kevin Kiley
- Past members: Steph Jerkova; Max Epstein; Nick Cogan; Vince Nguyen

Militarie Gun is an American alternative rock band from Los Angeles, formed in 2020. The band currently consists of Ian Shelton (lead vocals), William Acuña (rhythm guitar), Waylon Trim (bass, backing vocals), David Stalsworth (drums) and Kevin Kiley (lead guitar, backing vocals).

The band has released two full-length albums, Life Under the Gun (2023) and God Save the Gun (2025), as well as four extended plays. They are currently signed to American record label Loma Vista Recordings.

== History ==
=== 2020–2022: Formation and early years ===
Militarie Gun was initially founded in 2020 as a solo project of lead vocalist and primary songwriter, Ian Shelton, after his other musical project, Seattle hardcore band Regional Justice Center, went into a forced hiatus as a result of the COVID-19 pandemic and subsequent global lockdowns. During this period, Shelton wrote and recorded an EP, My Life Is Over, which was released September 10, 2020 via Denver DIY label Convulse Records. Following the EP's release, Shelton expanded the project by recruiting a full lineup including guitarists Nick Cogan and William Acuña, bassist Max Epstein, and drummer Vince Nguyen.

In 2021, Militarie Gun released their second and third EPs: All Roads Lead to the Gun on June 4, 2021, and All Roads Lead to the Gun II on September 10, 2021, via Alternatives Label. The following year, the group signed to Loma Vista Recordings and the pair of EPs were reissued through the label as a combined album, All Roads Lead to the Gun (Deluxe) on October 21, 2022, with additional b-sides, including lead single, Let Me Be Normal, released October 6, 2022 and featured appearances by Hattiesburg and Vancouver post-punk bands MSPAINT and Woolworm respectively.

Preceding the announcement of their record deal, the group would also release a pair of singles earlier in the year, including collaborative, standalone track, "Pressure Cooker" with Virginia musical artist and producer, Dazy on March 14, 2022 and a cover of John Lennon's 1971 protest song, "Gimme Some Truth", on July 26, 2022, serving as one-half of a split-release alongside, Santa Cruz hardcore band, Gulch and their cover of The Pixies, 1988 classic, "Monkey Gone To Heaven" for the soundtrack of Image Comics series, "What’s The Furthest Place From Here?". On January 23, 2023, a remixed version of the former, featuring, Missy Dabice of Philadelphia's, Mannequin Pussy was shared as a follow-up to the original, and would later go on to be featured in a commercial ad campaign for American fast-food chain, Taco Bell.

In support of these releases, Militarie Gun would tour extensively across North America, The United Kingdom and Europe, with the likes of Citizen, Prince Daddy & The Hyena, Public Opinion, Fiddlehead, Touché Amoré and White Reaper to name a few, throughout 2022 into the next year.

=== 2023–2024: Life Under the Gun ===
In 2023, Militarie Gun would release their debut album, Life Under the Gun, on June 23, 2023 via Loma Vista, preceded by three singles; "Do It Faster" (also featured in Taco Bell's campaign), premiered February 21, 2023 followed by "Very High" and "Will Logic" on April 18, and May 23, 2023, respectively. Following their debut's arrival, Militarie Gun would spend the remainder of the year on the road, accompanying Santa Cruz hardcore band, Scowl as direct support on their 2023 North American fall tour in promotion of that group's third EP, Psychic Dance Routine, along with MSPAINT and Milwaukee's Big Laugh, and immediately transition into their own international headlining tour behind the album, beginning in the UK and Europe, before eventually circling back through North America into early 2024, with support from San Francisco's, Spiritual Cramp and Pool Kids from Tallahassee.

Due to the demanding tour schedule ahead, band members, Cogan and Nguyen would quietly leave Militarie Gun without public statement, to re-focus on their original primary and respective post-hardcore bands, Drug Church and Modern Color, prior to the North American tour, with their last performance in the group in Tampa, Florida at the annual hardcore music festival, FYA Fest on January 7, 2024. After their departures, temporary fill-in guitarist, Dylan Mikres of Gumm and drummer, David Stalsworth of Oxnard powerviolence band, Torena would be brought on-board within a few weeks after to continue touring, while Kevin Kiley of Chicago bands, Lurk and Celebrity, would join the group a few months later, in-between tours as their new lead guitarist.

In the midst of the North American leg of the tour, Militarie Gun unveiled their fourth EP, Life Under The Sun, a re-imagined sampling and deconstruction of Life Under The Gun, released January 26, 2024 via Loma Vista. Initially, teased through the limited release of double single, "Very High (Under The Sun)" and "Never Fucked Up Twice" featuring Nashville musical artist, Bully on November 30, 2023, the project, consists of stripped-back acoustic and ambient reinterpretations of a few selections from the original, save for the project's last track, a NOFX cover, "Whoops I OD'd", plus additional contributions from Mannequin Pussy and Manchester Orchestra, featured on the EP's lead and third single, "My Friends Are Having A Hard Time" on January 23, 2024.

Throughout 2024, Militarie Gun would continue ceaseless touring domestically and internationally, back and forth across the globe to significant prominence, supporting the likes of Manchester Orchestra, A Day To Remember, The Story So Far, Gel, Hockey Dad, Lip Critic, while also performing their own sold-out shows, and a slew of high-profile music festival appearances including, Lollapalooza, Coachella, Primavera Sound, Welcome to Rockville, Bonnaroo and Reading/Leeds during the year.

On June 24, 2024, Militarie Gun would drop "Gun Under The Gun (MFG)", a primarily instrumental hardcore track, specifically requested and penned, as an entry theme for American musical artist, Post Malone and the use of his likeness in the pro wrestling video game series, WWE 2K24 as a playable DLC character. Soon after, the group would release another standalone single, "Thought You Were Waving" on July 14, 2024.

Militarie Gun would close out their 2024, as the opening act on Knocked Loose's North American fall tour, supporting the Oldham County band's third album, You Won't Go Before You're Supposed To, alongside The Garden and Drain, plus additional special guests, Danny Brown, Hatebreed, The Black Dahlia Murder and Counterparts on select dates, before concluding the year, with California punk band, Ceremony on December 6, 2024, for a special benefit show performance in the San Fernando Valley. The concert, hosted by local music shop, The Midnight Hour Records, was organized in solidarity of the Palestinian people, afflicted by the ongoing humanitarian crisis and ethnic cleansing occurring within the age-long Israeli–Palestinian conflict. All proceeds from the event would go to non-profit organizations, Palestine Children's Relief Fund and Care for Gaza, to provide financial aid and resources directly to the Palestinian civilians effected.

=== 2025–present: God Save the Gun ===
In 2025, the group would continue to support charitable relief efforts by contributing a demo version of "My Friends Are Having A Hard Time" to the compilation Good Music To Lift Los Angeles for fundraising album series "Good Music" (not to be confused with Kanye West-owned label GOOD Music), devised and curated by politically active, literary and music industry figures Dave Eggers and Jordan Kurland.

The limited-time collection, featuring previously unreleased material from the likes of Modest Mouse, R.E.M., TV On The Radio, Faye Webster, Mac DeMarco, Tenacious D, among many others, was only available to purchase within a 24-hour period on February 7, 2025, exclusively via Bandcamp, with net proceeds distributed to the California Community Foundation's Wildfire Recovery Fund and Los Angeles Food Bank, following the aftermath of the 2025 Southern California wildfires a month prior that year. Preceding the compilation, the band would embark on a short run of winter shows across the American East coast, with Mannequin Pussy.

Militarie Gun were scheduled to support English rock band High Vis on their 2025 North American spring tour. However, just a few weeks before the tour was set to begin, High Vis frontman Graham Sayle would sustain an undisclosed injury, requiring emergency medical treatment and extended recovery time, ultimately leading to the cancellation of the entire tour. Soon after, the band would once again work with Dazy on their second collaborate single, "Tall People Don’t Live Long", released April 18, 2025. On an Australian tour with Touché Amoré in July 2025, the band premiered several new songs – one of which was titled "B A D I D E A". That song was released officially the following month, coinciding with the announcement of the band's second album God Save the Gun. The final single from the album was "Throw Me Away". The album was released on October 17, 2025.

== Band members ==
Current

- Ian Shelton – lead vocals (2020–present), guitars, bass, drums (2020)
- William Acuña – rhythm guitar (2020–present)
- Waylon Trim – bass guitar, backing vocals (2022–2023, 2023–present), lead guitar (2023)
- David Stalsworth – drums (2024–present; touring 2023)
- Kevin Kiley – lead guitar, backing vocals (2024–present)

Former

- Steph Jerkova – backing vocals (2020)
- Max Epstein – bass, backing vocals (2020–2022)
- Nick Cogan – lead guitar (2020–2023, 2023–2024)
- Vince Nguyen – drums (2020–2024)

Former touring musicians

- Che Hise-Gattone – bass (2023)
- Linda Susan – bass, backing vocals (2023)
- Dylan Mikres – lead guitar (2024)

== Discography ==
Studio albums

- Life Under the Gun (2023)
- God Save the Gun (2025)

EPs

- My Life Is Over (2020)
- All Roads Lead to the Gun (2021)
- All Roads Lead to the Gun II (2021)
- Life Under the Sun (2024)

Compilations

- All Roads Lead to the Gun (Deluxe) (2022)
- God Save The Gun (Deluxe) (2026)

== Singles ==
Title	Year	Peak chart positions	Album
Title	Year	US Alt.	Album
"Dislocate Me"	2020	–	My Life Is Over
"Don’t Pick Up The Phone"	2021	–	All Roads Lead To the Gun
"Big Disappointment"	2021	–	All Roads Lead To the Gun II
"Pressure Cooker" (with Dazy)	2022	–	Non-album single
"Gimme Some Truth" (John Lennon cover)	2022	–	What’s The Furthest Place From Here? - Vol. 6 (7" Split w/ Gulch)
"Let Me Be Normal"	2022	–	All Roads Lead To the Gun (Deluxe)
"Pressure Cooker" (Remix) (with Dazy featuring Mannequin Pussy)	2023	–	Non-album single
"Do It Faster"	2023	29	Life Under the Gun
"Very High"	2023	–	Life Under the Gun
"Will Logic"	2023	–	Life Under the Gun
"Very High (Under The Sun) / Never Fucked Up Twice" (featuring Bully)	2023	–	Life Under the Sun
"My Friends Are Having A Hard Time" (featuring Manchester Orchestra)	2024	–	Life Under the Sun
"Gun Under the Gun (MFG)"	2024	–	Non-album single
"Thought You Were Waving"	2024	–	God Save the Gun
"Tall People Don’t Live Long" (with Dazy)	2025	–	Non-album single
"B A D I D E A"	2025	–	God Save the Gun
"World's Always Burning" (with Mannequin Pussy)	2026	–	

=== As featured artist ===
Title	Year	Album
"No Sum" (Cold Mega featuring Militarie Gun)	2022	COLD MEGA
"Delete It" (MSPAINT featuring Militarie Gun)	2023	Post-American

== Tours ==
Title	Year
Militarie Gun Tour	2022
Life Under the Gun Tour	2023
The BAD IDEA Tour	2025
God Save the Gun Tour	2026
