= How Flowers Grow =

Studio album by Scowl
- Released: November 19, 2021
- Recorded: July 2020
- Studio: The Panda (Fremont)
- Genre: Hardcore punk
- Length: 15:29
- Language: English
- Label: Flatspot Records

Scowl chronology
Reality After Reality... (2019)	How Flowers Grow (2021)	Psychic Dance Routine (2023)

“It’s cool that hardcore is seeing just this creative renaissance. It means that there’s more young people who are getting involved in hardcore, who are gonna start their own bands and keep the spirit alive... I feel really lucky to be watching it all happen, and being able to participate a little with my band.”

—Vocalist Kat Moss on the success of How Flowers Grow and commercial viability of hardcore punk in 2022.

How Flowers Grow is the debut studio album by American hardcore punk band Scowl. The album was released on November 19, 2021, through Flatspot Records.

== Reception ==
Professional ratings
Review scores
Source	Rating
Kerrang!	4/5
Punknews.org	4.5/5 stars

An overview of the album with vocalist Kat Moss in BrooklynVegan found critic Andrew Sacher calling this release "a fun album, overflowing with energy that feels genuinely addictive" that also features "purpose" and "inner rage" in the lyrics. Paul Travers of Kerrang! rated this album a 4 out of 5, calling it "a dizzying, breathless howl of a debut", stating that Scowl "manage to cram a lot of structure and memorable hooks into their compact explosions of barely contained chaos". Editors at PunkNews chose this for a Staff Pick and critic John Gentile rated it 4.5 out of 5 stars, stating that "they’ve mastered their hardcore style and are applying items from a different galaxy to their own base". A profile in Revolver by Mia Hughes called this album "an awesome burst of aggressive, street-punk-inflected hardcore that also hints at the band's willingness to channel a diverse range of influences, from Sonic Youth to the Stooges". Tom Breihan of Stereogum summed up the music, "it fucking destroys" and told readers that the listening experience "feels like having adrenaline injected straight into your eyeball".

Several outlets included this on best of the year lists. At Revolver, Eli Enis included this among the top 10 hardcore punk albums of the year, placing it ninth for being "stuffed with no-nonsense power chords, sprinting punk rhythms and barked commands". In Spin, Maria Sherman included this among an unranked list of the 30 best punk albums of the year, telling readers, "If you don’t love them now, you will. And soon." Stereogum editors included How Flowers Grow as the fourth of the top 10 hardcore albums of 2021, where critic Tom Breihan calls out vocalist Kat Moss in particular, stating that "she roars and snarls with absolute authority, and she makes her rage feel universal".

== Track listing ==
1. "Bloodhound" – 1:34
2. "Dead to Me" – 1:48
3. "Pay Privilege Due" – 0:55
4. "Trophy Hunter" – 1:27
5. "Seeds to Sow" – 1:46
6. "Idle Roaring Room" – 1:12
7. "Fuck Around" – 0:56
8. "Roots" – 1:35
9. "Four Walls" – 1:37
10. "How Flowers Grow" – 2:39

== Personnel ==
Scowl

- Cole Gilbert – drums
- Malachi Greene – guitar
- Bailey Lupo – bass guitar
- Kat Moss – vocals

Additional personnel

- Christian Castillo – photography
- Sammy Ciaramitaro – additional vocals on "Fuck Around"
- Aidan Delaney – saxophone on "Seeds to Sow"
- Angel Garcia – additional vocals on "Trophy Hunter"
- Jose Gonzales – layout, design
- Charles Toshio – recording, mixing, mastering
- Chris Wilson – artwork

== See also ==
- 2021 in American music
- List of 2021 albums
