= Oso Oso =

American rock band

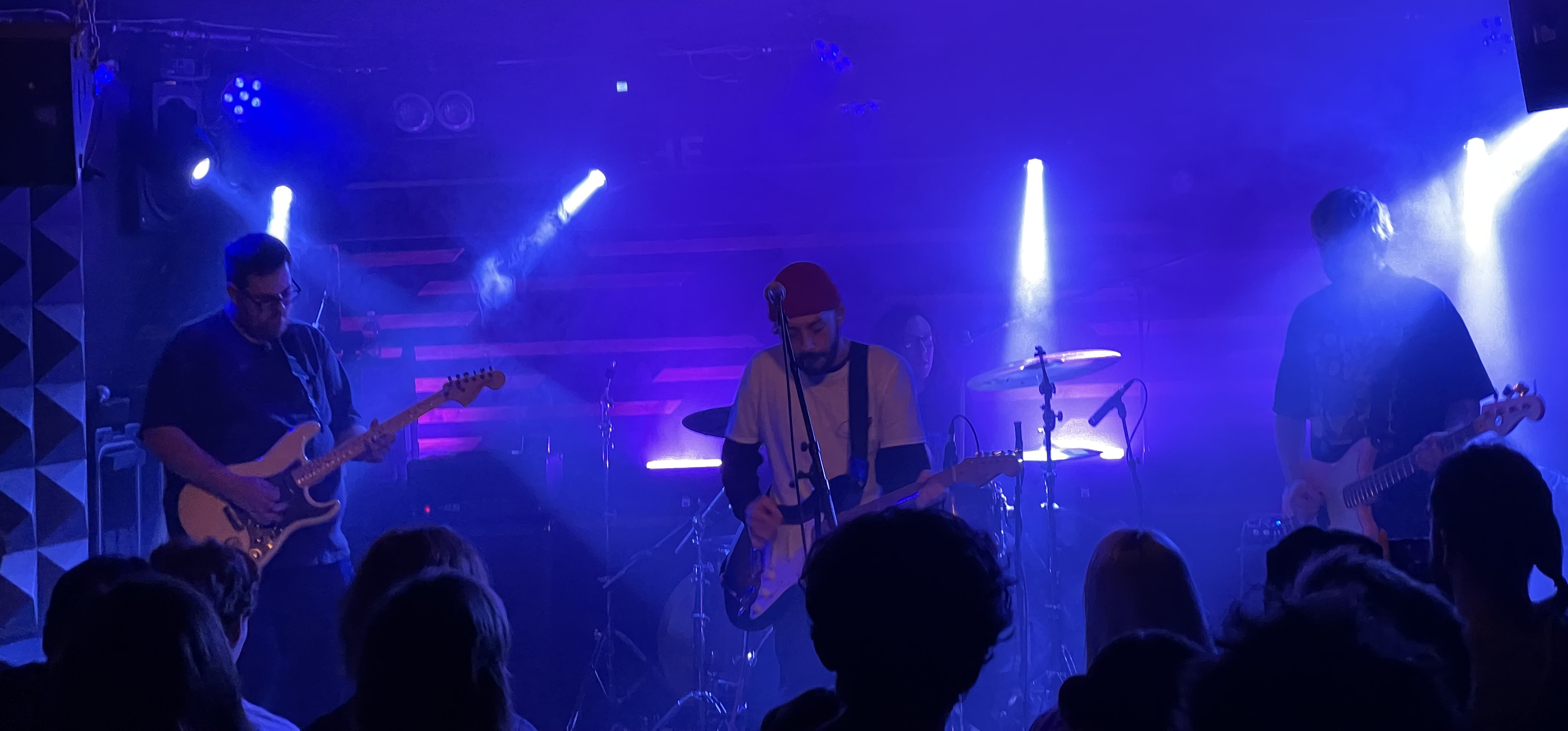

Background information
- Origin: Long Island, New York, United States
- Genres: Emo; indie rock; pop punk; power pop
- Years active: 2014–present
- Labels: Triple Crown Records; Seal Mountain Records; Soft Speak Records; Counter Intuitive Records; Yunahon Entertainment
- Members: Jade Lilitri

Oso Oso is an American rock band from Long Beach, New York. Jade Lilitri (vocals, guitar), formerly of State Lines, is the only permanent member. Jade uses Lilitri as a pen name. The band has released four studio albums and two EPs. Their 2019 release, Basking in the Glow, and their 2022 release, Sore Thumb, were named "Best New Music" by online music magazine Pitchfork.

== History ==
Originally named osoosooso, the band began as a side-project EP released through Soft Speak Records. Soon after, Lilitri decided to expand upon the project and shorten its name, citing misspelled tour flyers as one reason for the change. That same year, Oso Oso released a split with emo band Free Throw. In 2014, Oso Oso released their first full-length album titled Real Stories Of True People Who Kind Of Looked Like Monsters on Soft Speak Records. In 2017, Oso Oso released their second full-length album titled The Yunahon Mixtape on Seal Mountain Records. In January 2018, Oso Oso signed to Triple Crown Records. The Yunahon Mixtape was repressed following the release of their first EP gb/ol h/nf / subside with Triple Crown Records. In June of 2018 the band released gb/ol h/nf / subside, their first release since signing with Triple Crown Records.

Oso Oso released their third album Basking in the Glow on August 16, 2019.

The band's guitarist Tavish Maloney died in March 2021 aged 24. In April, the band released the full video of their last show with Maloney, recorded in December 2020.

In July of 2024, the band announced their new album Life Till Bones. The album was released on August 9.

== Influences ==
Lilitri cites fellow Long Island emo bands Brand New and Taking Back Sunday as influences, recalling how often he listened to their respective sophomore albums Deja Entendu and Where You Want to Be in elementary school. His first concert was Bayside at a small club in 2006, with then-little known Paramore as the opening act. He was also influenced by Archers of Loaf, The Cars, and Death Cab for Cutie.

== Discography ==
Studio albums

- Real Stories of True People Who Kind of Looked Like Monsters (2015, Soft Speak Records)
- The Yunahon Mixtape (2017, Seal Mountain Records)
- Basking in the Glow (2019, Triple Crown Records)
- Sore Thumb (2022, Triple Crown Records)
- Life Till Bones (2024, Yunahon Entertainment LLC)
- An Exchange of Information (2026)

EPs and splits

- Osoosooso (2014, Soft Speak Records)
- Oso Oso/Free Throw (2014, Soft Speak Records)
- gb/ol h/nf / subside (2018, Triple Crown Records)
- Tour Split with The Wonder Years / Have Mercy / Oso Oso / Shortly (2018, self-released)
