= The Bots =

- Origin: Los Angeles, California, United States
- Genres: Indie rock, garage punk
- Years active: 2007–present
- Members: Mikaiah Lei
- Past members: Anaiah Muhammad
- Website: web.archive.org/web/20210213221506/http://www.thebotsband.com/

The Bots are an American, Los Angeles–based indie rock band, founded by brothers Mikaiah Lei and Anaiah Muhammad. They perform garage punk music.

Rolling Stone named them an artist "Most Likely To Succeed in 2014" during their coverage of acts performing at the annual Coachella Music Festival.

The Bots had already self released an album and three EPs before they signed to Fader Label in 2013. The band debuted their album Pink Palms in October 2014 via Fader.

In 2021, the Bots released their second album 2 Seater, featuring new drummer Alex Vincent (also of Los Angeles act Stop Thought). The record was recorded and produced in Austin, Texas by Adrian Quesada of Grammy-Award-nominated band Black Pumas.

== Discography ==
=== Albums ===
- 2004 – Truth
- 2014 – Pink Palms
- 2021 – 2 Seater

=== Extended play ===
- 2010 – Black and White Lights

=== Singles ===
- 2010 – "No One Knows"
- 2013 – "Sincerely Sorry"

== Live performances ==
- Osa Do Mar, Spain (2017)
- Afro-Punk, London (2017)
- Reading and Leeds, UK (2015)
- Edgefest, Toronto (2015)
- Riot Fest, Toronto (2014)
- FunFunFun Fest (2014)
- Afropunk Festival (2014)
- Bonnaroo (2014)
- Coachella (2014)
- Outside Lands (2014)
- Summer Sonic Festival (2014)
- Lowlands Festival (2012)
- Vans Warped Tours (2011)
