= Sore Thumb (album) =

Studio album by Oso Oso
- Released: March 18, 2022
- Recorded: February 2021
- Studio: Two Worlds Recording Studio (Queens, New York City)
- Genre: Emo; power pop
- Label: Triple Crown
- Producer: Jade Lilitri; Billy Mannino; Tavish Maloney

Oso Oso chronology
Basking in the Glow (2019)	Sore Thumb (2022)	Life Till Bones (2024)

Sore Thumb is the fourth studio album by American rock band Oso Oso, released on March 18, 2022, through Triple Crown Records.

== Background ==
Sore Thumb was envisioned as a way to relieve the pressure of following up on its predecessor; to experiment and have fun without the prospect of it being released. Lilitri spent a month recording with his cousin Tavish Maloney, and reunited with engineer Billy Mannino, whom he had worked with on The Yunahon Mixtape (2017). Maloney died one month later, which led Lilitri to package the recordings as the next Oso Oso album, as a tribute to his relative: "The making of this record is a now a memory of a time that I hold closer to my heart than anything," he said.

The album was surprise released on March 18, 2022.

== Reception ==
Pitchfork awarded it its Best New Music tag, with reviewer Arielle Gordon calling it "adventurous": "Knowing that these songs were likely meant to be reworked before their release makes the record seem contoured by imperfections [...] Sore Thumb is Oso Oso when no one's watching, still casually sincere and effortlessly earnest." Stereogum columnist Chris DeVille viewed it among the best albums of its year, commenting that Sore Thumb is "another study in startlingly melodic aching splendor, stripped-down in feel yet loaded with dazzling lyrics and fascinating sounds". Zach Schonfeld at Spin also ranked it among the year's best, writing, "Sore Thumb is considerably looser and more eclectic [than past efforts]."

== Track listing ==
All tracks are written by Jade Lilitri.

No.	Title	Length
1.	"Computer Exploder"	3:18
2.	"Nothing to Do"	3:04
3.	"Father Tracy"	3:57
4.	"Give a Fork"	3:04
5.	"All Love"	1:18
6.	"Fly on the Wall"	2:59
7.	"Describe You"	3:14
8.	"Pensacola"	3:16
9.	"Sunnyside"	3:04
10.	"Because I Want To"	2:18
11.	"Nothing Says Love Like Hydration"	2:02
12.	"Carousel"	3:52
13.	"Tav World"	1:02

- Prior to its release, "Tav World" was originally listed as a separate track on streaming music services, like Apple Music and Spotify. Upon its release, it was appended to the end of the previous track, "Carousel", after 30 seconds of silence, totaling 5:24 in length.

== Personnel ==
Credits adapted from the album's liner notes.

Musicians

- Jade Lilitri – vocals, guitar, bass, drums, aux percussion, producer
- Tavish Maloney – guitar, aux percussion, vocals on “Carousel”, producer
- Billy Mannino – piano, producer, recording engineer
- Josh Knowles – violin on “Describe You”

Production

- Mike Sapone – mixing engineer
- Mike Kalajian – recording engineer
- Daniel Maddalone – additional production
- Gianni Gambuzza – additional production
- Alfred Barzykowski – cover photo
