= Post-American =

Studio album by MSPaint
- Released: February 20, 2023
- Recorded: Late 2022
- Studio: Nick Panella's home studio, Hattiesburg, Mississippi, United States; Pit Recording Studios
- Genre: Post-hardcore, synth-punk
- Length: 30:06
- Language: English
- Label: Convulse
- Producer: Ian Shelton; Taylor Young

MSPaint chronology
MSPaint (2020)	Post-American (2023)	No Separation (2025)

Singles from Post-American
- 1. "Acid"; 2. "Delete It"; 3. "Titan of Hope"

Post-American is the first full-length studio album by American post-hardcore band MSPaint, released on February 20, 2023.

== Reception ==
Professional ratings
Review scores
Source	Rating
Loud and Quiet	8/10
Pitchfork	7.4/10
The Alternative	4/5 stars

Writing for Loud and Quiet, Kyle Kohner gave this album an 8 out of 10, calling it "one of the most refreshing punk records anyone will hear this year". Nina Corcoran of Pitchfork rated Post-American a 7.4 out of 10, praising frontman Deedee in particular as "the final garnish on an album defined by unexpected combinations" that "instills a humble profundity in MSPaint's music". In a profile of MSPaint published before the release of this album, Stereogum's Julia Towers predicted this would be one of the best albums of the year and in a June round-up of the best albums of 2023, the publication placed this at third, with Chris DeVille writing that "there's nothing quite like this album".

In a June 19 review of the best albums of 2023, editors at Paste ranked this 23 for being "an invigorating call to prioritize love and justice in a time when virtually every part of society and culture encourages robotic mindlessness". In Exclaim!, this was rated the 19th best album of 2023. Editors at Stereogum chose this for the ninth best album of 2023. Editors at Pitchfork included this in their list of the 37 best rock albums of 2023. Editors at BrooklynVegan included this on their list of the 55 best albums of 2023.

A piece by Nina Corcoran for Pitchfork chose this album to spotlight how American hardcore punk music embraced experimentation and cross-genre elements in 2023.

== Track listing ==
Lyrics by Deedee, music by MSPaint.

1. "Information" – 2:13
2. "Think It Through" – 2:58
3. "Acid" – 2:45
4. "Hardwired" – 2:52
5. "Delete It" – 2:22
6. "S3" – 1:26
7. "Decapitated Reality" – 3:13
8. "Post‐American" – 3:06
9. "Free from the Sun" – 2:21
10. "Titan of Hope" – 3:28
11. "Flowers from Concrete" – 3:22

== Personnel ==
MSPaint

- Deedee – vocals
- Quinn Mackey – drums
- Nick Panella – electronics
- Randy Riley – bass guitar

Additional personnel

- Cody Bass – artwork
- Mike Resigner – character designs for artwork
- Ian Shelton – vocals on "Delete It", production
- Brock Stephens – insert artwork
- Nick Townsend – mastering at Infrasonic Sound
- Taylor Young – recording, mixing, production

== See also ==
- List of 2023 albums
