= MSPaint (band) =

American post-hardcore band

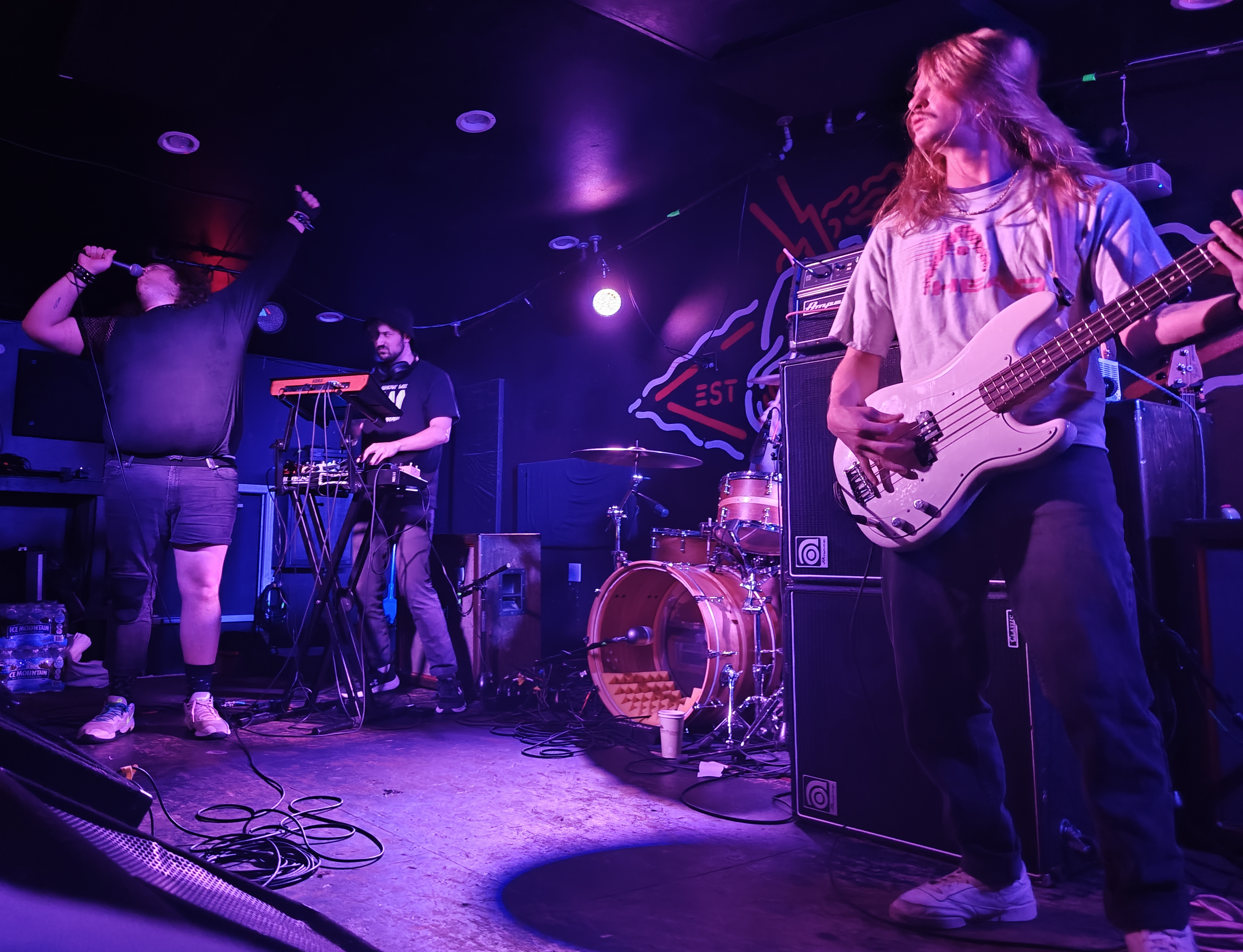
- MSPaint performing in 2024

Background information
- Origin: Hattiesburg, Mississippi, U.S.
- Genres: Synth punk; art punk; post-hardcore; post-punk
- Years active: 2019–present
- Label: Convulse
- Members: Nick Panella; Quinn Mackey; Randy Riley; DeeDee
- Website: mspaintband.com

MSPaint (stylised in all caps) is an American rock band formed in Hattiesburg, Mississippi, in 2019. The quartet consists of vocals, drums, synthesizer, and bass guitar, explicitly missing a guitar traditionally associated with the type of music they perform.

== Career ==
The band first released music in March 2020 and has collaborated with contemporaries Militarie Gun. Their synth-punk sound has been dubbed as industrial art-punk.

== Discography ==
=== Studio albums ===
- Post-American (2023)

=== Extended plays (EP) ===
- MSPaint (2020)
- No Separation (2025)
