= Scowl (band) =

American hardcore punk band

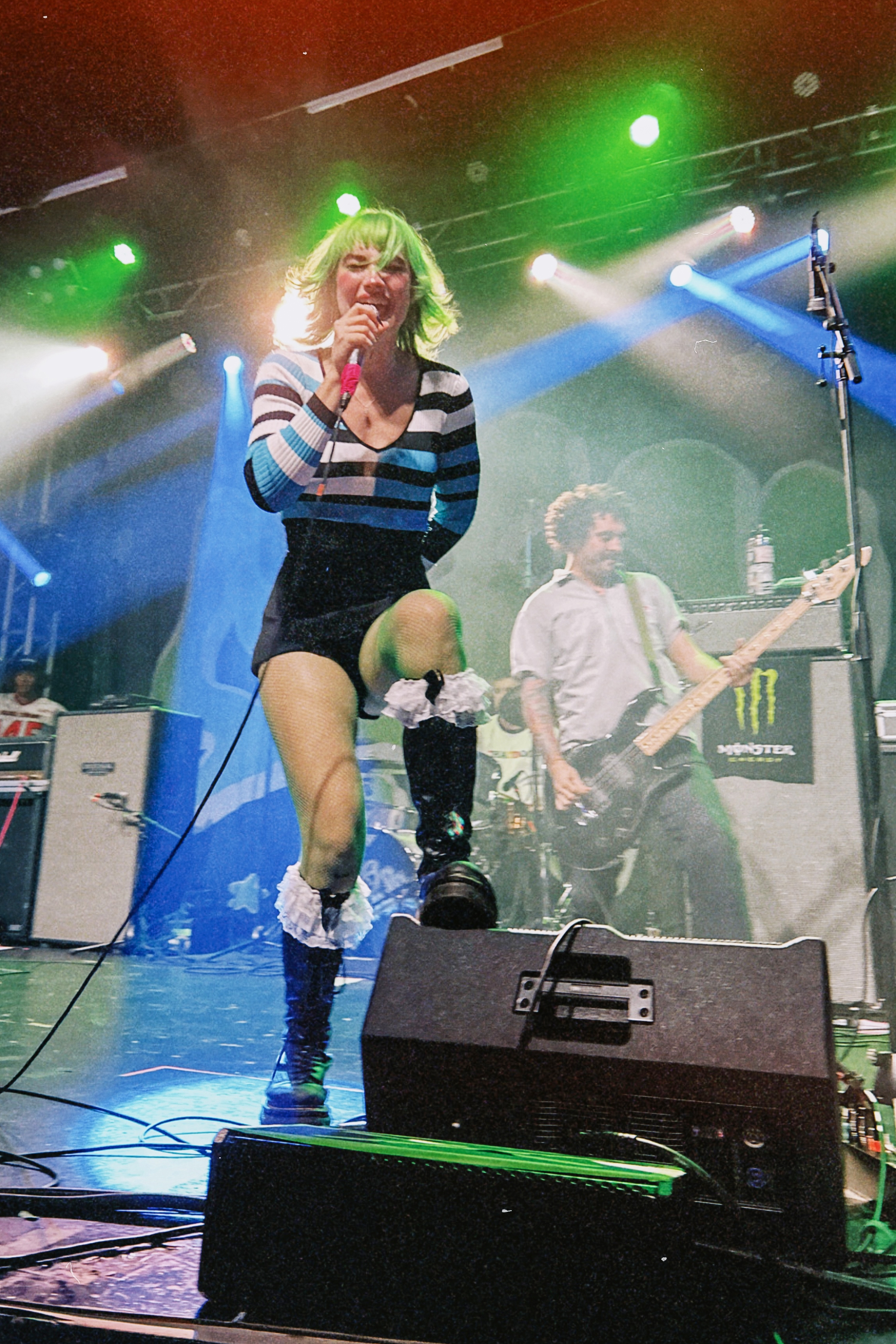

Background information
- Origin: Santa Cruz, California, U.S.
- Genres: Alternative rock; hardcore punk; pop punk
- Years active: 2019–present
- Labels: Flatspot; Dead Oceans
- Members: Kat Moss; Mike Bifolco; Bailey Lupo; Cole Gilbert
- Past members: Malachi Greene
- Website: www.scowl40831.com

Scowl is an American rock band from Santa Cruz, California, formed in 2019. The band consists of singer Kat Moss, guitarist Mike Bifolco, bassist Bailey Lupo, and drummer Cole Gilbert.

== History ==
The band released their first collection of songs, a self-titled EP, in 2019. Scowl released a second EP in 2019, titled Reality After Reality.... In 2021, the group released their debut full-length album, How Flowers Grow, through Flatspot Records. The group released their third EP in 2023 titled Psychic Dance Routine.

Scowl has toured and shared the stage with bands like Circle Jerks and Negative Approach, System Of A Down, Korn, Turnstile and Deftones, Limp Bizkit, and toured Australia in May and June 2023 with Sunami and Speed. The band also played the 2023 edition of the famed Coachella festival. In a 2022 interview with hardcore magazine In Effect singer Kat Moss said about touring: "We are focused heavily on touring as much as possible! We are trying to hit all the places in the US that we haven’t played yet as well as across the pond!"

On October 8, 2024, Scowl announced their signing to Dead Oceans with a new single titled Special. Their sophomore album, Are We All Angels, was released on April 4, 2025.

In October of 2025 Greene left the band. Singer Kat Moss announced in May of 2026 that Scowl has taken a break from touring, adding: "I needed some freedom to breathe."

== Members ==
Current members

- Cole Gilbert – drums (2019–present)
- Bailey Lupo – bass (2019–present)
- Kat Moss – vocals (2019–present)
- Mike Bifolco – guitar (2023–present; touring 2022)

Former members

- Malachi Greene – guitar (2019–2025)

== Discography ==
=== Albums ===
List of albums, with release date and label shown
Title	Details
How Flowers Grow	Released: November 19, 2021; Label: Flatspot Records; Formats: CD, LP, Digital Download
Are We All Angels	Released: April 4, 2025; Label: Dead Oceans; Formats: CD, LP, Digital Download

=== EPs ===
List of EPs, with release date and label shown
Title	Details
Scowl	Released 11 May 2019; Label: self-released; Formats: digital download
Reality After Reality...	Released 30 November 2019; Label: self-released; Formats: CD, LP, digital download
Psychic Dance Routine	Released 7 April 2023; Label: Flatspot Records; Formats: CD, LP, digital download

=== Live albums ===
List of albums, with release date and label shown
Title	Details
Live at Audiotree	Released 27 February 2024; Label: Audiotree Music; Formats: digital download

=== Singles ===
List of singles, with release date and label shown
Title	Details	Album
"Bloodhound"	Released 22 September 2021; Label: Flatspot Records; Formats: digital download	How Flowers Grow
"Fuck Around"	Released 13 October 2021; Label: Flatspot Records; Formats: digital download	How Flowers Grow
"Seeds to Sow"	Released 3 November 2021; Label: Flatspot Records; Formats: digital download	How Flowers Grow
"Opening Night"	Released 8 February 2023; Label: Flatspot Records; Formats: digital download	Psychic Dance Routine
"Shot Down"	Released 1 March 2023; Label: Flatspot Records; Formats: digital download	Psychic Dance Routine
"Psychic Dance Routine" (Nuovo Testamento Remix)	Released 6 September 2023; Label: Flatspot Records; Formats: digital download	Non-album single
"Special"	Released 8 October 2024; Label: Dead Oceans; Formats: digital download	Are We All Angels

=== Music videos ===
- "Petty Selfish Cretin" (26 November 2019, self-released) [dir. Malachi Greene]
- "Bloodhound" (22 September 2021, Flatspot Records) [dir. Malachi Greene]
- "Seeds to Sow" (3 November 2021, Flatspot Records) [dir. Malachi Greene]
- "Opening Night" (8 February 2023, Flatspot Records) [dir. Malachi Greene]
- "Shot Down" (1 March 2023, Flatspot Records) [dir. Malachi Greene]
- "Special" (8 October 2024, Dead Oceans) [dir. Silken Weinberg]
- "Not Hell Not Heaven" (23 January 2025, Dead Oceans) [dir. Sean Stout]
