= Culture Abuse =

Punk rock band

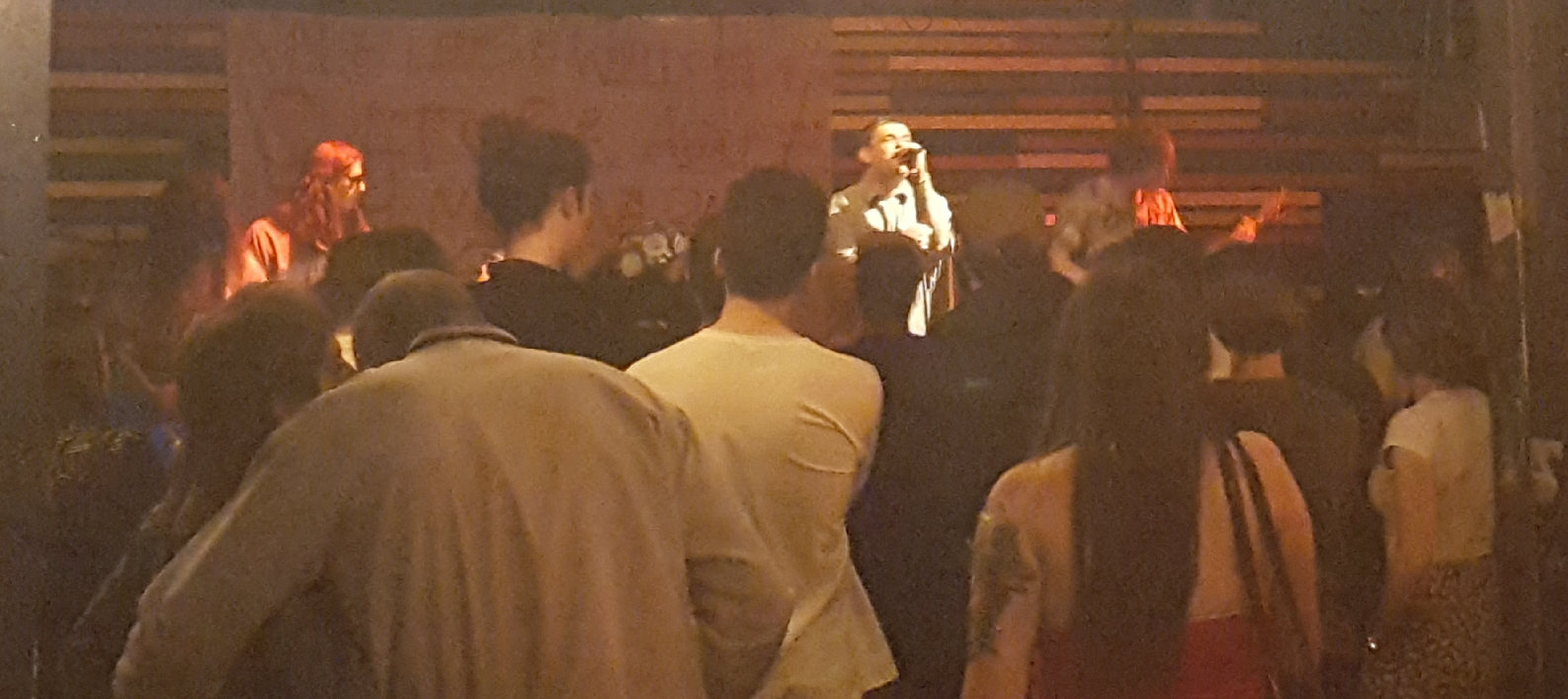
- Culture Abuse photographed in Montréal, Québec, Canada at the Ritz PDB

Background information
- Origin: San Francisco, California, U.S.
- Genres: Punk rock; soft grunge; alternative rock; indie rock; garage rock
- Years active: 2013–2020
- Labels: 6131; Epitaph
- Spinoffs: Zulu
- Past members: David Kelling; Ross Traver; Nick Bruder; John McCarthy; Shane Plitt; Anthony LaSalle; Matt Walker; Anaiah Lei
- Website: cultureabuse.bandcamp.com

Culture Abuse was an American rock band from San Francisco that was active from 2013 to 2020.

== History ==
The band formed in San Francisco in 2013. The band released two full-length albums. The first album, titled Peach, was released in 2016 on 6131 Records. In 2018, Culture Abuse signed to Epitaph Records and released their second full-length album titled Bay Dream. That year, the band added drummer Anaiah Lei.

Besides their music, the band is notable for their lead singer, David Kelling, having cerebral palsy. Kelling sought to fight the media narrative of "a normal human, then you have a disabled person" and show parents that "their kid can be a hero too".

Culture Abuse disbanded as of July 2020 after lead singer David Kelling admitted to sexual misconduct allegations.

In 2021, their song "So Busted" was featured at the end of The Suicide Squad.

After Culture Abuse's breakup, drummer Anaiah Lei focused on his project Zulu, which became a full-lineup band. However, Zulu parted ways with him and ultimately went inactive in 2025 after Anaiah was accused of domestic violence and abuse.

== Discography ==
Studio albums

- Peach (2016, 6131 Records)
- Bay Dream (2018, Epitaph Records)
