= New Noise Magazine =

American music magazine

- The cover of New Noise Magazine's 26th issue (July 2016), illustrated by Chris Shary.
- Editor-in-Chief: Lisa Root
- Managing Editor: Addison Herron-Wheeler
- Staff writers: Cheetah Chrome
- Categories: Music
- Frequency: Bimonthly
- Format: A4
- Circulation: 8,000
- Publisher: Lisa Root
- Founder: Lisa Root
- Founded: February 2013
- First issue: April 2013; 13 years ago
- Company: New Noise Magazine, Inc.
- Country: United States
- Based in: Berkeley, California
- Language: English
- Website: newnoisemagazine.com
- ISSN: 2770-2901 (print); 2770-291X (web)
- OCLC: 1273418019

New Noise Magazine is an American music magazine that focuses on artist news, band interviews, album reviews and underground culture. It was founded in February 2013, by Lisa Root, who had previously been the co-founder and editor-in-chief of such publications as AMP Magazine, Loud Fast Rules! Magazine and Hails & Horns Magazine. New Noise Magazine's managing editor, Addison Herron-Wheeler, has written for Decibel, Exclaim!, Invisible Oranges, MetalSucks, Metal Rules, CVLT Nation, San Diego CityBeat, Westword, RVA Magazine, High Times, Culture Magazine and Bust, and is the editor-in-chief and co-owner of Out Front. Musician Cheetah Chrome once wrote a political column for the magazine.

The print magazine is published bimonthly, with eight issues a year; each issue is offered in a choice of multiple different cover arts (two or three variants), and comes with a flexi disc that includes exclusive music content. The first print issue was released in April 2013. New Noise Magazine's website was launched beforehand, on February 21, 2013, and features different coverage from the printed issues.

Some of the magazine's articles have been quoted, re-published or cited in such publications as Chicago Tribune, Pittsburgh Post-Gazette, Star Tribune, The Arizona Republic, The Fresno Bee, The Kansas City Star, Missoula Independent, The Dispatch, Herald News, The Record, and The Rock Island Argus.

== Flexi Collection ==
New Noise Magazine has been including free flexi discs, under the Flexi Collection series, for its subscribers since its 23rd issue. Each flexi disc contains previously unreleased and exclusive material from the cover band. Some issues have included two flexi discs (sometimes two per issue, other times one for each alternative cover), while others have included two bands on a single flexi disc.

Flexi volume #	Band	Magazine issue #	Release date	Ref
1	The Falcon	23	February 2016	
2	Pears	24	April 2016	
3	Black Tusk	24	April 2016	
4	Culture Abuse	25	May 2016	
5	Descendents	26	July 2016	
6	NOFX	27	August 2016	
7	Bear vs. Shark	28	October 2016	
8	Radkey	29	December 2016	
9	Iron Reagan	30	February 2017	
10	Wear Your Wounds	31	March 2017	
11	Me First and the Gimme Gimmes	32	May 2017	
12	Cock Sparrer	32	May 2017	
13	Armstrongs	33	June 2017	
14	Trapped Under Ice	34	August 2017	
15	Iron Chic	35	September 2017	
16	Hot Water Music	35	September 2017	
17	The Black Dahlia Murder	36	October 2017	
18	Primal Rite	37	December 2017	
19	Screaming Females	38	January 2018	
20	American Nightmare	39	March 2018	
21	The HIRS Collective	40	June 2018	
22	Culture Abuse / Nothing	41	August 2018	
23	Adolescents	42	August 2018	
24	Cursive	43	October 2018	
25	The Lemonheads	44	December 2018	
26	Masked Intruder	45	January 2019	
27	Teenage Bottlerocket	45	January 2019	
28	Misery Index	46	February 2019	
29	Bad Religion	47	April 2019	
30	Ceremony	48	July 2019	
31	Avail	49	August 2019	
32	Counterparts / Stray From the Path	50	November 2019	
33	Four Year Strong	51	January 2020	
	Hey, Chels	51	January 2020	
34	Abysmal Dawn	52	April 2020	
35	The Lawrence Arms	53	August 2020	
36	Lydia Loveless	54	October 2020	
37	Less Than Jake	55	November 2020	
38	Viagra Boys	55	November 2020	
39	NOFX	56	February 2021	
40	Tetrarch	57	April 2021	
41	The Armed	57	April 2021	
42	We Are the Union	58	May 2021	
43	The Bronx	59	September 2021	
44	Full of Hell	60	October 2021	
45	The Chisel	60	November 2021	
46	Hot Water Music	61	February 2022	
48	The Interrupters	63	June 2022	
49	Show Me the Body	64	October 2022	
50	L.S. Dunes	64	October 2022	
51	Anti-Flag	65	January 2023	
