= Deafheaven discography =

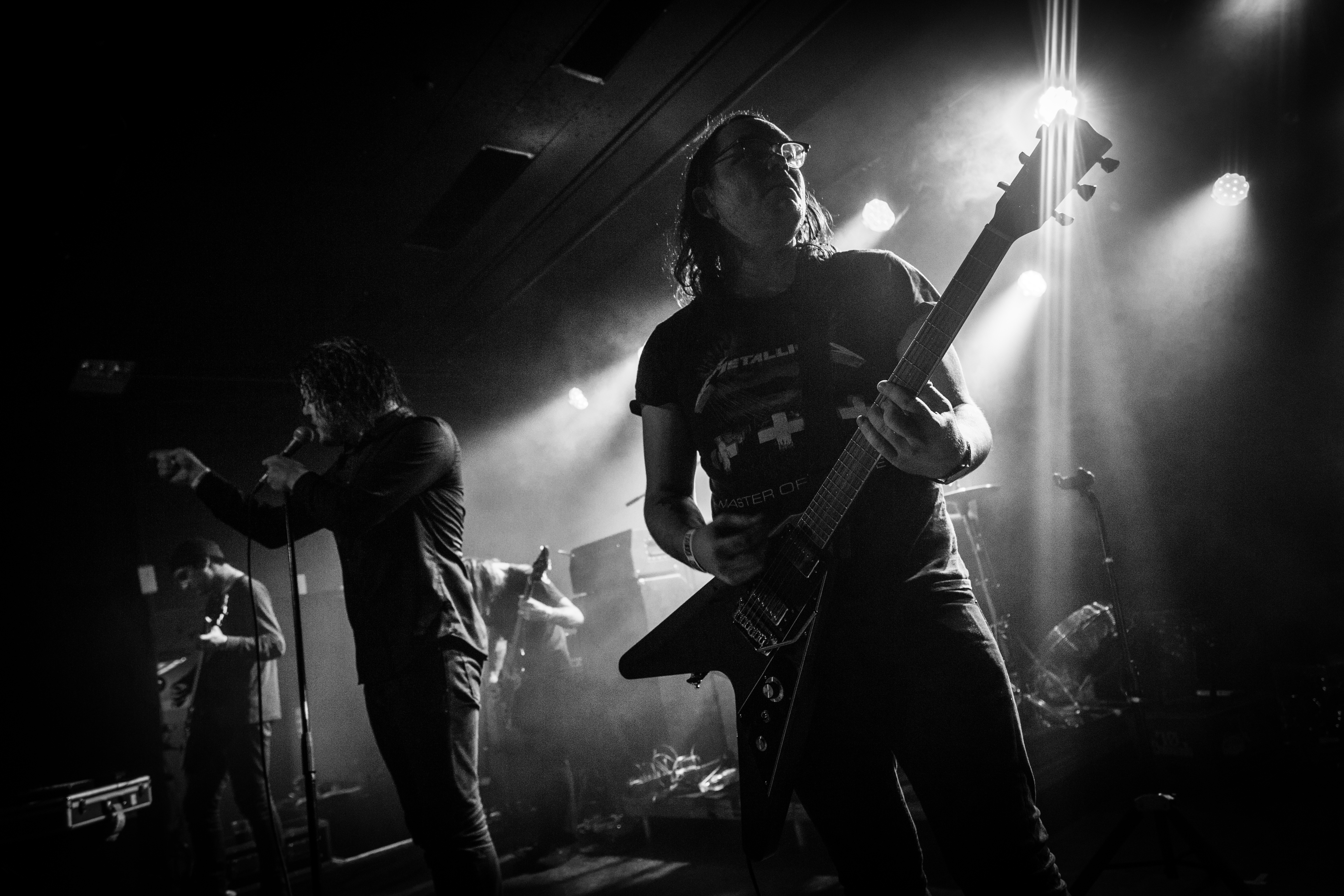
- Deafheaven performing in Copenhagen in 2017
- Studio albums: 6
- EPs: 2
- Live albums: 3
- Singles: 15
- Music videos: 9
- Splits: 1

Deafheaven is an American blackgaze band formed in 2010. Originally based in San Francisco, the group began as a two-piece with singer George Clarke and guitarist Kerry McCoy, who recorded and self-released a demo album together. Following its release, Deafheaven recruited three new members and began to tour. Before the end of 2010, the band signed to Deathwish Inc. and later released their debut album Roads to Judah, in April 2011. A follow-up album, Sunbather, was released in 2013 to wide critical acclaim, becoming one of the best reviewed albums of the year in the United States. In 2015 the band released their third album, New Bermuda, and in 2018 their fourth, Ordinary Corrupt Human Love. Their fifth studio album, Infinite Granite, was released in 2021. They announced their sixth album, Lonely People With Power, on January 27, 2025, and it was released on March 28. It is their first album released through Roadrunner Records, which they joined in 2024.

Deafheaven has released six full-length albums, two solo extended plays (EPs), a split EP, three live albums, and fifteen singles (including two non-album singles).

== Albums ==
=== Studio albums ===
List of studio albums, with selected chart positions and certifications
Title	Album details	Peak chart positions									
Title	Album details	US	US Alt	US Indie	US Rock	US Hard Rock	AUS	BEL (FL)	GER	SWI	UK
Roads to Judah	Released: April 26, 2011; Label: Deathwish; Formats: CD, LP, DL	—	—	—	—	—	—	—	—	—	—
Sunbather	Released: June 11, 2013; Label: Deathwish; Formats: CD, 2×LP, CS, DL	130	–	23	40	10	—	—	—	—	—
New Bermuda	Released: October 2, 2015; Label: Anti-; Formats: CD, 2×LP, DL	63	—	8	16	9	—	88	51	—	—
Ordinary Corrupt Human Love	Released: July 13, 2018; Label: Anti-; Formats: CD, 2×LP, DL	111	—	4	18	5	54	90	23	—	99
Infinite Granite	Released: August 20, 2021; Label: Sargent House; Formats: CD, 2×LP, DL	130	12	20	19	—	— (Note: Infinite Granite did not enter the ARIA Albums Chart, but peaked at number seven on the ARIA Hitseekers Albums chart.)	97	17	55	—
Lonely People with Power	Released: March 28, 2025; Label: Roadrunner; Format: CD, 2×LP, DL	— (Note: Lonely People with Power did not enter the Billboard 200 but peaked at number 13 on the Top Album Sales component chart.)	—	—	—	20	—	90	67	68	—
"—" denotes a recording that did not chart or was not released in that territory.

=== Live albums ===
Title	Release details	Notes
Live at The Blacktop	Released: July 27, 2011; Label: Deathwish (DWLIVE08); Format: DL	Eighth installment of the Deathwish Live Series. Recorded on January 15, 2011, at The Blacktop in Bell Gardens, California.
10 Years Gone	Released: December 4, 2020; Label: Sargent House (SH 242); Format: CD, 2×LP, DL	Recorded live-in-studio in June 2020 at The Atomic Garden Studio East in Oakland, California.
Under the Blue Valley	Released: April 18, 2026; Label: Roadrunner; Format: LP	Recorded live-in-studio on April 24, 2025, for KEXP in Seattle, Washington.

== Extended plays ==
Title	Release details	Notes
Demo	Released: June 1, 2010; Label: Sargent House (SH092); Format: CS, LP, DL	Demo recording. Self-released on cassette; later remastered and released on 12" vinyl via Sargent House.
Deafheaven / Bosse-de-Nage	Released: November 20, 2012; Label: The Flenser (FR26); Format: LP, DL	Split recording. Deafheaven contributed cover versions of "Punk Rock" and "Cody" from Mogwai's Come On Die Young.
At Work in the Fields of the Bomb	Released: October 9, 2026; Label: Roadrunner; Format: CD, LP	The title and concept of the EP come from photographer Robert Del Tredici’s 1987 book of the same name.

== Singles ==
Year	Title	Album
2011	"Libertine Dissolves" / "Daedalus"	Demo
2014	"From the Kettle Onto the Coil"	non-album single
2015	"Brought to the Water"	New Bermuda
2015	"Come Back"	New Bermuda
2018	"Honeycomb"	Ordinary Corrupt Human Love
2018	"Canary Yellow"	Ordinary Corrupt Human Love
2019	"Black Brick"	non-album single
2020	"Daedalus" (Live)	10 Years Gone
2020	"Glint" (Live)	10 Years Gone
2021	"Great Mass of Color"	Infinite Granite
2021	"The Gnashing"	Infinite Granite
2021	"In Blur"	Infinite Granite
2023	"Vertigo"	Sunbather (10th Anniversary Remix / Remaster)
2025	"Magnolia"	Lonely People with Power
2025	"Heathen"	Lonely People with Power

== Videography ==
=== Music videos ===
Year	Title	Director	Ref.
2016	"Luna"	Sam Hughes	
2018	"Honeycomb"	Ben Chisolm	
2018	"Canary Yellow"	Ben Chisolm	
2018	"Night People" (feat. Chelsea Wolfe)	Ben Chisolm	
2019	"Black Brick" (live)	—N/a	
2021	"In Blur"	John Bradburn	
2025	"Magnolia"	Sean Stout & Chelsea Jade	
2025	"Heathen"	Mute Widows	
2025	"Winona"	Pulse Films	
2026	"Hunter"	Nico Poalillo	
