= Dream House (song) =

Promotional single by Deafheaven

from the album Sunbather
- Released: May 1, 2013
- Recorded: January 2013
- Studio: The Atomic Garden (Oakland)
- Genre: Blackgaze; post-metal; art metal
- Length: 9:14
- Label: Deathwish Inc.
- Songwriters: George Clarke; Kerry McCoy
- Producers: Deafheaven; Jack Shirley

"Dream House" is a song by the American blackgaze band Deafheaven from their second studio album, Sunbather (2013). "Dream House" is a blackgaze, post-metal, and art metal track; its lyrics were inspired by lead vocalist George Clarke noticing high-rise apartments while walking around San Francisco at night. The song was written by Clarke and Kerry McCoy, and percussion was later added by drummer Daniel Tracy. It was produced by the trio alongside Jack Shirley.

"Dream House" premiered on NPR on May 1, 2013, being the first song released off Sunbather. It received positive reviews from music critics, who praised it for its mix of influences and its engaging song structure. Many publications included "Dream House" in their lists of the best songs of 2013. It has also become a staple at the band's live performances.

== Background and release ==
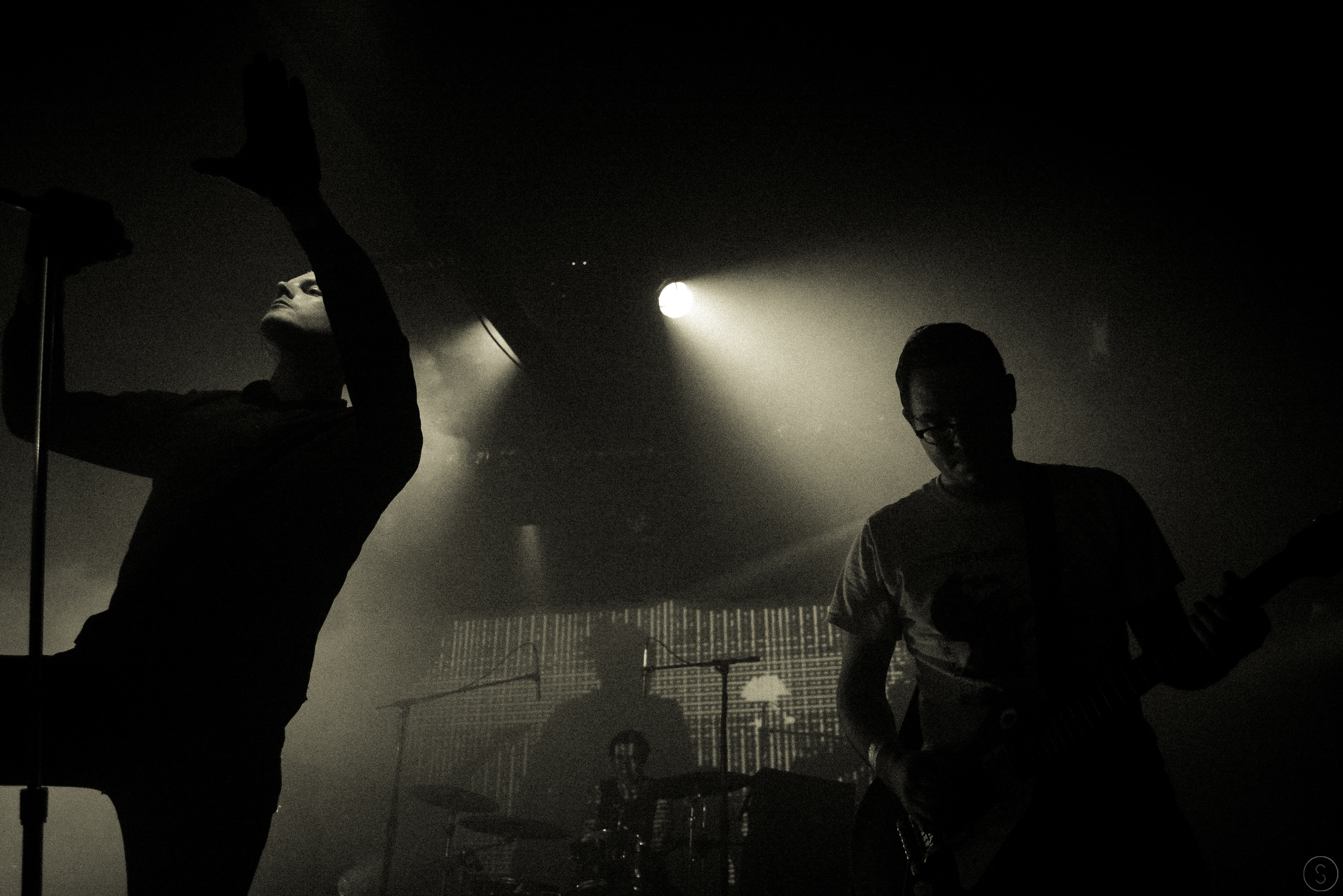
Deafheaven performing in 2013

Following the release of Deafheaven's debut record Roads to Judah (2011), guitarist Nick Bassett, drummer Trevor Deschryver, and bassist Derek Prine left the band, leaving behind founding members George Clarke and Kerry McCoy. Clarke and McCoy subsequently wrote the majority of Deafheaven's follow-up album Sunbather together, which according to Clarke let the two "get into each other's heads". Towards the end of the writing process, the two were joined by drummer Daniel Tracy, who contributed percussion to the tracks. The band recorded the album in January 2013 over the course of five days at the Atomic Garden Recording Studio.

"Dream House" debuted on NPR on May 1, 2013, as the first song to be released from Sunbather. The song has become a live staple for Deafheaven, including performances of the track before the release of Sunbather. (Note: Sunbather was released on June 11, 2013.) A live version of "Dream House" was also recorded for the live album 10 Years Gone.

== Composition and lyrics ==
"Dream House" is a blackgaze, post-metal, and art metal song with a length of nine minutes and fourteen seconds. It begins with "fuzzed-out" guitars and blast beats, accompanied by Carlin screaming. Tori Pederson of Punknews.org remarked that the start of the song could not be "any more black metal if they tried", while NPR's Lars Gotrich deemed it to have a melodic punk sound similar to the band's 2010 demo album. Around five minutes into the song, this is followed by a sparse instrumental midsection, featuring a single guitar. Finally, the song ends with a three-minute half-time outro reminiscent of post-rock. Gotrich likened the second half of "Dream House" to Mogwai, and Pederson compared it to Explosions in the Sky. Meanwhile, the end of the song has been likened to U2 by both Gotrich and Jeff Yerger of the Recording Academy. Vince Neilstein of MetalSucks described the track as having traces of black metal, but finding it closer to the post-rock sound of If These Trees Could Talk and Constants. Similarly, Ross Watson of The Skinny likened its sound to "Mayhem jamming with My Bloody Valentine".

Lyrically, Clarke explained that "Dream House" concerned the inequality of wealth in San Francisco. He recalled walking around at night and seeing high-rise apartments with "meticulous, beautiful, and expensive" things inside, and mused about how he both opposed wealth yet desired it. The song ends with dialogue that, according to Clarke, was assembled from text messages sent between him and a woman he loved while drunk; he included the conversation as he believed it "sum[med] up the contrast between this big, beautiful ending and this big, tragic ending". In a retrospective article about the album, Jay Papandreas of Stereogum suggested that "Dream House" reflected Sunbather's overall theme of yearning, depicting a narrator who desired sobriety, to move to the East Cost, and death. In addition, Vice's Andy O'Connor interpreted "Dream House" in 2019 as a "lamentation for lost dreams", writing that it reflected the instability and worries of those growing up in the 2010s.

== Critical reception ==
"Dream House" received acclaim from music critics. Ian Cohen of Pitchfork labeled "Dream House" as the "Best New Track", praising its scope and instruments. Marc Abbott of Under the Radar wrote the track was "as firm a statement of intent as you’ll find", with respects to it being the album's opener. Jeff Terich of Treble and O'Connor concurred, with both deeming "Dream House" to be a successful blend of the band's various influences. Both Stereogum's Michael Nelson and The A.V. Club's Jonah Bayer found that the song managed to stayed engaging by avoiding repetition and by varying sonic intensity throughout. Neilstein praised the track's production, calling its sound "big, booming, and clear". Both Robert Garland of Sputnikmusic and David Von Bader of Consequence noted how "Dream House" lent Sunbather as a whole a sense of immediacy, whereas Xenophanes, also of Sputnikmusic, commented that this immediacy allowed Deafheaven to bridge their older and newer sounds.

In May 2013, Nelson called "Dream House" the best song of both the month and the year as a whole. Several publications also included it among the best songs of 2013. Pitchfork ranked it as the year's 9th-best song, with Jason Heller praising it for its blend of black metal, shoegaze, and hardcore, and for simultaneously "being weightless and enslaved to gravity". Beats Per Minute and Consequence placed it at numbers 14 and 18 of their year-end lists, respectively, with both publications claiming that the song defied genre entirely. PopMatters ranked it as the 25th-best song of 2013, and Rolling Stone ranked it as the year's 92nd-best.

== Personnel ==
Credits are adapted from Apple Music.

- George Clarke – lead vocals, songwriter, producer
- Kerry McCoy – guitar, bass, songwriter, producer
- Daniel Tracy – drums, producer
- Jack Shirley – mastering, mixing, producer, recording engineer
