= 10 Years Gone =

Ten Years Gone

Live album by Deafheaven
- Released: December 4, 2020
- Recorded: June 2020
- Studios: The Atomic Garden Studio East, Oakland, California
- Genres: Blackgaze; black metal; shoegaze; post-metal; post-rock
- Length: 72:30
- Label: Sargent House
- Producers: Jack Shirley; Deafheaven

Deafheaven chronology
Ordinary Corrupt Human Love (2018)	Ten Years Gone (2020)	Infinite Granite (2021)

10 Years Gone is a live album by American blackgaze band Deafheaven. It was recorded live-in-studio at The Atomic Garden Studio East in Oakland, California, and released on December 4, 2020, through Sargent House.

== Background ==
"Earlier this year we intended on celebrating the 10th anniversary of the Deafheaven demo released through Bandcamp on June 1, 2010 with a tour of North America with our friends Inter Arma, Greet Death and All Your Sisters. Unfortunately, we couldn't fulfill that tour because of fallout from the Covid-19 pandemic. To rebound from the financial and morale hit, we put together an album of the set we intended to perform.

Revisiting the songs in this studio sessions format with Jack Shirley at Atomic Garden reminded us of how important these years have been. I'm thankful we were able to give songs like Daedalus, the first we wrote, and other favorites like Vertigo and Kettle new power after so many years of playing them. They made me think of the people who played on them with us. For the first time we've included information on who played on what tracks and when they were originally released. We included thank you-s in the liner notes to these musicians who've spent time with this project, on tour or on record and all of the touring crew, label support and management support who have helped us this past decade ..."

— George Clarke

10 Years Gone was created in celebration of the band's 10-year anniversary, after the COVID-19 pandemic forced them to cancel a planned 10th anniversary tour. It is the second live album by Deafheaven (the band had previously released Live at The Blacktop in 2011).

The album includes live renditions of songs that originally appeared on the band's demo EP ("Daedalus"), Roads to Judah ("Language Games"), Sunbather ("Vertigo", "The Pecan Tree", "Dreamhouse"), New Bermuda ("Baby Blue"), Ordinary Corrupt Human Love ("Glint"), and a non-album single ("From the Kettle Onto the Coil"). A live version of "Language Games" was previously released on Live at The Blacktop.

== Critical reception ==
In a review of the album for Louder Sound, Christina Wenig gave it four stars out of five and called it "...a sonic portfolio that shows the impressive evolution of one of our present moment's most distinct metal bands..." She said, "10 Years Gone doesn't offer the energy, spontaneity and little mishaps that make the magic of an actual live album, but how could it? Ultimately, this record is the chronicle of a band reaching out to their community, to not only look back together, but to also push through an incredibly hard time for all of us."

== Track listing ==
All tracks are written by Deafheaven.

No.	Title	Length
1.	"From the Kettle Onto the Coil"	6:28
2.	"Daedalus"	4:51
3.	"Vertigo"	14:05
4.	"Language Games"	5:51
5.	"Glint"	11:19
6.	"Baby Blue"	8:49
7.	"The Pecan Tree"	11:45
8.	"Dreamhouse"	9:22

== Personnel ==
Credits adapted from the liner notes of 10 Years Gone.

Deafheaven

- Kerry McCoy
- Shiv Mehra
- Daniel Tracy
- Christopher Johnson
- George Clarke

Additional personnel

- Chelsea Jade Metcalf – album design
- Jack Shirley – producer, engineering, mixing, mastering
- Deafheaven – music, lyrics, producer
- Bobby Cochran – photography

== Charts ==
Chart performance for 10 Years Gone
Chart (2020)	Peak position
US Top Current Album Sales (Billboard)	56
