= Black Brick =

Single by Deafheaven
- Released: February 27, 2019
- Recorded: February 2018
- Genre: Thrash metal; black metal
- Length: 7:27
- Label: Anti-
- Songwriters: George Clarke; Kerry McCoy
- Producer: Jack Shirley

Deafheaven singles chronology
"Canary Yellow" (2018)	"Black Brick" (2019)	"Great Mass of Color" (2021)

Audio video
- "Black Brick" on YouTube

"Black Brick" is a song by the American post-black metal band Deafheaven. It is an outtake from the band's Ordinary Corrupt Human Love sessions and was released as a stand-alone single.

== Release ==
Black Brick was released for streaming and as a digital download on February 27, 2019 through Anti- records. The track did not receive any marketing or promotion; its surprise release coincided with the start of Deafheaven's March–April 2019 US tour with Baroness.

== Critical reception ==
Music critics praised the track for being one of Deafheaven's heaviest songs to date with many critics noting that it differed greatly from the other songs from the Ordinary Corrupt Human Love sessions. Other critics noted elements of thrash metal and compared it to the darker and heavier material on their 2015 album New Bermuda. In his write-up for "Black Brick"'s release, Andrew Sacher of BrooklynVegan wrote: "It's darker and more evil than Deafheaven almost ever sound, with mile-a-minute thrash riffs, metalcore chugs, and other devil horn-worthy sounds worked in to their usual post-black metal approach. It's the first song they released since being nominated for a Grammy (but losing to High on Fire), and if you thought Grammy exposure would make them want to go in an even softer direction, you thought wrong."

Revolver said of the song: "Not only has the single dropped seemingly out of the blue, but it's also Deafheaven's heaviest offering yet, a fully necro blast of sepulchral grimness. The seven-and-a-half-minute cut is a B-side from Ordinary Corrupt Human Love, and one can only wonder how different the album would have felt as a whole with its inclusion." In their review of Deafheaven's performance on their tour with Baroness, the Los Angeles Times' August Brown wrote: "The new, writhing single 'Black Brick' pulls more from classic thrash, and its sudden peals of violence put everything else around it in sharper focus. Texture and drama are baked into these songs, and sequencing them well clearly matters a lot to this band."
