= New Bermuda =

New Bermuda may refer to:

- New Bermuda, Virginia, original name of Thomas Dale's 1613 colonial settlement north of Jamestown, at the junction of the Appomattox and the James
- New Bermuda, Florida, proposed site in Florida for resettlement of Bermuda settlers, mapped out in 1750s by John William Gerard de Brahm
- New Bermuda (album), 2015 album by Deafheaven
