= All Fours (album) =

Studio album by Bosse-de-Nage
- Released: April 14, 2015
- Genre: Post-black metal; post-hardcore; post-rock; screamo
- Length: 54:51
- Label: Profound Lore
- Producer: Jack Shirley

Bosse-de-Nage chronology
Deafheaven / Bosse-de-Nage (2012)	All Fours (2015)	Further Still (2018)

All Fours is the fourth studio album by American band Bosse-de-Nage. Released on April 14, 2015 by Profound Lore Records, It was produced by Jack Shirley, who is known for his work for Deafheaven and Loma Prieta.

== Musical style ==
The album features a black metal and post-hardcore style infused with "mathy post-rock, shoegaze and screamo" elements, which drew comparisons to the works of Slint and Shirley in the post-hardcore genre. The vocalist Bryan Manning's sex-themed lyrics were also compared to the works of Pig Destroyer, Italo Calvino and Jorge Luis Borges.

== Reception ==
Professional ratings
Review scores
Source	Rating
Decibel	8/10
Exclaim!	9/10

The album generally received positive reviews from music critics. Decibel magazine critic Sean Frasier described the record as "a journey—ending with an ascent up “The Most Modern Staircase”—where vocalist/lyricist Bryan Manning challenges complacency and dismisses simple answers to difficult questions while sharing his darkest thoughts with teeth bare." Exclaim!'s Michael Rancic praised the album, writing: "It's not just how many styles Bosse-De-Nage wield, but how and when they go about doing it, that proves them to be equally great songwriters and musicians and makes All Fours such an artful, smart and rewarding record."

The album was featured as number 13 on Pitchfork's list of "The Best Metal Albums of 2015".

== Track listing ==
No.	Title	Length
1.	"At Night"	8:21
2.	"The Industry of Distance"	5:57
3.	"-"	2:04
4.	"A Subtle Change"	5:52
5.	"Washerwoman"	9:21
6.	"In a Yard Somewhere"	5:45
7.	"To Fall Down"	7:43
8.	"The Most Modern Staircase"	9:48
Total length:		54:51

== Personnel ==
Bosse-de-Nage

- D. – bass
- H. (Harry Cantwell) – drums
- B. (Bryan Manning) – vocals
- M. – guitar

Other personnel

- Jack Shirley – production, recording, mixing, mastering
- Astrid J. Smith – violin and string arrangements
