= Violet Cold =

Azerbaijani solo musical project

- Origin: Baku, Azerbaijan
- Genres: Blackgaze; Atmospheric black metal; Post-metal
- Years active: 2013–present
- Members: Emin Guliyev
- Website: violetcold.com

Violet Cold is an Azerbaijani solo musical project created by composer and multi-instrumentalist Emin Guliyev. Working from Baku, Guliyev had begun releasing music as Violet Cold by 2013. The project combines black metal with elements of post-rock, ambient, electronic music and regional folk music. Violet Cold's albums Anomie (2017) and Empire of Love (2021) were included in Stereogum's year-end lists of the best metal albums.

== History ==
Guliyev began Violet Cold in 2013 and initially released the project's music independently. The 2015 album Desperate Dreams brought early international attention: Stereogum featured it in its monthly metal column, describing the project as prolific and stylistically broader than its black-metal foundation. The album Magic Night followed in 2016, and Anomie was released in 2017. Stereogum ranked Anomie fifth on its list of the best metal albums of 2017, highlighting its mixture of atmospheric black metal, electronic textures and post-rock.

In 2018, Violet Cold issued the three-part Sommermorgen series, subtitled Innocence, Joy and Nostalgia. The project followed it with kOsmik in 2019. The album was self-released and later received physical distribution through the Italian label Avantgarde Music. Kerrang! also selected kOsmik for a 2019 list of underground albums with crossover appeal.

Noir Kid was released in 2020. Violet Cold's 2021 album Empire of Love paired the project's black-metal base with prominent pop and electronic elements. Stereogum ranked the album eighth on its list of the year's ten best metal albums and discussed its rainbow-colored reinterpretation of Azerbaijani national imagery in relation to black metal's conventions. Invisible Oranges also reviewed the album in its May 2021 release roundup.

The project subsequently released Səni Uzaq Kainatlarda Axtarıram in 2022 and Multiverse in 2023.

== Musical style and reception ==
Violet Cold is commonly associated with blackgaze and atmospheric black metal. Decibel described Guliyev as moving freely among electronic, post-rock, post-metal, funeral-doom and Middle Eastern folk influences while retaining a black-metal framework. Reviewing kOsmik, Invisible Oranges noted the project's shifts among black metal, post-rock, shoegaze, trance and ambient music. Heavy Blog Is Heavy similarly treated the album as an expansion of post-black metal's stylistic range.

== Selected discography ==
- Desperate Dreams (2015)
- Magic Night (2016)
- Anomie (2017)
- Sommermorgen: Innocence, Joy and Nostalgia (2018)
- kOsmik (2019)
- Noir Kid (2020)
- Empire of Love (2021)
- Səni Uzaq Kainatlarda Axtarıram (2022)
- Multiverse (2023)
