= Kerry McCoy =

Kerry McCoy may refer to:

- Kerry McCoy (wrestler) (born 1974), American amateur wrestler
- Kerry McCoy (musician) (born 1988), American musician and songwriter
