= Lonely People with Power =

Studio album by Deafheaven
- Released: March 28, 2025
- Studios: EastWest (Hollywood, California)
- Genre: Blackgaze
- Length: 62:08
- Label: Roadrunner
- Producer: Justin Meldal-Johnsen

Deafheaven chronology
Infinite Granite (2021)	Lonely People with Power (2025)	At Work in the Fields of the Bomb (2026)

Singles from Lonely People with Power
- 1. "Magnolia" Released: January 27, 2025; 2. "Heathen" Released: February 25, 2025; 3. "Winona" Released: March 28, 2025

Lonely People with Power is the sixth studio album by American metal band Deafheaven, released on March 28, 2025, through Roadrunner Records. It was the band's first album since joining the label in 2024.

Having previously completely abandoned black metal elements on 2021's Infinite Granite, Lonely People with Power saw Deafheaven return to their usual blackgaze sound. The album was universally acclaimed by critics, and was named a top-ten release of the year by publications such as Consequence, Decibel, Exclaim!, Kerrang! and The Ringer. BrooklynVegan and Metal Injection named it the best album of the year.

== Recording and themes ==
Like its predecessor Infinite Granite, the album was produced by Justin Meldal-Johnsen. It was recorded at EastWest Studios in Hollywood, California. It features additional vocal contributions from Boy Harsher's Jae Matthews and Interpol's Paul Banks. The album's cover artwork features American former pornographic actress Jenna Haze.

Both frontman George Clarke and guitarist Shiv Mehra said that the title is not an explicit political statement, but Clarke explained to Kerrang! that "power" refers to "influence" and how "to reach the top, you need to be anti-community and not watch out for other people." He cited William Randolph Hearst as a precursor for the people that the album's title describes – those who, "in order to fulfill this lust for control, need an ironic detachment from the world around you, without generosity or humanism."

Clarke's family informed multiple songs on Lonely People with Power. "Magnolia" is named after the state flower of Mississippi, where Clarke attended his uncle's funeral. "Winona" takes its title from the Mississippi town of the same name, where his grandparents lived and much of his family is buried.

"Body Behavior" was written about an older male role model showing a younger boy pornography as an attempt at bonding. Musically, it was inspired by krautrock and Clarke described its bridge as "Infinite Granite by way of In Rainbows."

Album closer "The Marvelous Orange Tree" touches upon themes of suicide and is named after the illusion by French magician Jean-Eugène Robert-Houdin.

== Release ==
On January 27, 2025, Deafheaven announced Lonely People with Power, simultaneously releasing its lead single, "Magnolia". In an interview, Sam Law of Kerrang! noted the song's more aggressive sound compared to most of Deafheaven's other material, with vocalist George Clarke replying "Yes, 'Magnolia' is quite musically aggressive. And there are parts throughout the record that sound similar. There is definitely a degree of ferocity to Lonely People with Power, but it has always been an aim for Deafheaven to maintain an emotional core and not to see things through any singular lens." The music video for "Magnolia", directed by Sean Stout and Chelsea Jade, was released on the same day.

On January 29, 2025, the band announced their 2025 North American tour, supported by Gatecreeper and Trauma Ray. The tour began at The Belasco in Los Angeles on April 19 and concluded in Arizona in May, before moving to Europe for a string of music festival performances throughout the summer, including England's Outbreak Fest and Germany's Rock am Ring. A second single, "Heathen", was released on February 25, 2025. Lonely People with Power was released by Roadrunner Records on March 28, 2025, alongside a short film for "Winona".

== Critical reception ==
Professional ratings
Aggregate scores
Source	Rating
AnyDecentMusic?	8.0/10
Metacritic	85/100
Review scores
Source	Rating
AllMusic	4/5 stars
Clash	9/10
Kerrang!	4/5
The Line of Best Fit	9/10
Metal Hammer	4/5 stars
NME	4/5 stars
Pitchfork	7.5/10
PopMatters	8/10
Rolling Stone	4/5 stars
Sputnikmusic	5.0/5

At Metacritic, which assigns a normalized rating out of 100 to reviews from mainstream publications, Lonely People with Power received an average score of 85 based on 16 reviews, indicating "universal acclaim".

In a 9/10 review, Greg Hyde of The Line of Best Fit dubbed it an "artistic triumph" and Deafheaven's finest album to date, praising the band as having honed their "musicianship and songwriting abilities" and writing that the album "blends the strongest elements of a 'metal' album like New Bermuda with the strongest elements of a 'shoegaze' album like Infinite Granite, and features the band playing both metal and shoegaze better than they did on either album". Brenna Ehrlich of Rolling Stone similarly wrote that the band "mixes painterly lyrics, raw aggression, and earworm melodies on their best album yet". Kerrang!'s Nick Russell wrote, "Six albums in, Deafheaven have made both their heaviest and most balanced, rounded record, perhaps ever."

=== Year-end lists ===
Publication	Accolade	Rank	Ref.
Alternative Press	50 Best Albums of 2025	—	
Beats Per Minute	Top 50 Albums of 2025	47	
BrooklynVegan	Top 55 Albums of 2025	1	
Clash	Albums of the Year 2025	54	
Consequence	The 50 Best Albums of 2025	5	
Decibel	Top 40 Albums of 2025	9	
Drowned in Sound	25 Favourite Albums of 2025	17	
Exclaim!	50 Best Albums of 2025	8	
Kerrang!	The 50 Best Albums of 2025	10	
Metal Hammer	Top 50 Albums of 2025	6	
Metal Injection	Top 25 Albums of 2025	1	
PopMatters	The 80 Best Albums of 2025	49	
The Ringer	The 25 Best Albums of 2025	9	
Slant Magazine	The 50 Best Albums of 2025	44	
Stereogum	The 50 Best Albums of 2025	26	

== Track listing ==
All tracks are written by Deafheaven.

No.	Title	Length
1.	"Incidental I"	0:56
2.	"Doberman"	6:34
3.	"Magnolia"	4:14
4.	"The Garden Route"	5:48
5.	"Heathen"	5:02
6.	"Amethyst"	8:14
7.	"Incidental II" (featuring Jae Matthews)	4:20
8.	"Revelator"	6:24
9.	"Body Behavior"	5:23
10.	"Incidental III" (featuring Paul Banks)	2:08
11.	"Winona"	7:28
12.	"The Marvelous Orange Tree"	5:37
Total length:		62:08

== Personnel ==
Credits adapted from the liner notes of Lonely People with Power, except where noted

Deafheaven

- George Clarke – vocals
- Kerry McCoy – guitar
- Shiv Mehra – guitar
- Chris Johnson – bass
- Daniel Tracy – drums

Additional personnel

- Justin Meldal-Johnsen – production (at Chez JMJ), engineering (at EastWest), additional synthesizers (at Chez JMJ), sound design (at Chez JMJ)
- Darrell Thorp – engineering (at EastWest)
- Mike Schuppan – engineering (at EastWest)
- Chaz Sexton – assistant engineering (at EastWest)
- Zach Weeks – mixing and mastering (at God City Studio)
- Jae Matthews – vocals (on "Incidental II")
- Paul Banks – spoken word (on "Incidental III")
- Winona Choir – vocals (track 11)
  - Chelsea Jade Metcalf
  - Trayer de la Torre
  - Georgia Nott
  - Spencer Zahn
  - Katrina Urton
  - James Kelly
  - Carly Bond
  - Lukas Frank
  - Emily Fehler
  - Leon Mosburg
- Nick Steinhardt – creative direction (for 23in)
- Foie Graphics – additional design

== Charts ==
Chart performance for Lonely People with Power
Chart (2025)	Peak position
Belgian Albums (Ultratop Flanders)	90
Croatian International Albums (HDU)	21
German Albums (Offizielle Top 100)	67
Hungarian Physical Albums (MAHASZ)	12
Scottish Albums (Official Charts)	28
Swiss Albums (Schweizer Hitparade)	68
UK Album Downloads (Official Charts)	24
UK Rock & Metal Albums (Official Charts)	5
US Top Hard Rock Albums (Billboard)	20
