= Corridoré =

- Origin: Madison, Wisconsin, United States
- Genres: Post-metal, black metal, blackgaze
- Label: Hypaethral Records
- Members: Eric Andraska; Matt Allen; Russell Emerson Hall; Nick Bartley
- Past members: Drew Carlson

Corridoré is an American post-metal band from Madison, Wisconsin. Its music combines black metal and post-metal with elements of post-rock, blackgaze, doom metal, and shoegaze. The band released its self-titled debut album in 2019 and its second album, Abandon, through Hypaethral Records in 2025.

== History ==
Bassist and vocalist Eric Andraska and guitarist Matt Allen had previously played together in the Madison indie-rock band The Selfish Gene. They formed Corridoré with drummer Drew Carlson and released the two-song demo Vanquish the Light of Day in 2017. Both tracks ran for more than ten minutes and combined long-form structures with shifts between black metal and post-rock.

The trio spent more than a year writing its self-titled debut album. Spenser Morris recorded the core instrumental tracks at Decade Music Studios in Chicago, and Jerry McDougal engineered later guitar overdubs in Madison. Guitarist Russell Emerson Hall joined after the album was completed, expanding Corridoré to a quartet. The four-track album was self-released in 2019 and marked with an August 3 release show at BarleyPop Live in Madison. Tone Madison included the album in its year-end selection of 20 standout Madison records, and Jordan Jerabek selected it for Heavy Blog Is Heavy's Outliers roundup of records that individual writers considered among the year's best.

By 2025, the lineup consisted of Andraska on bass and vocals, Allen and Hall on guitars and vocals, and Nick Bartley on drums. The band recorded its second album, Abandon, with Dustin Sisson at Blast House Studios in Madison; Carl Saff mastered the album in Chicago. Hypaethral Records released it on August 22, 2025, the same day as an album-release show at Madison's Gamma Ray. Reviewing the album for Everything Is Noise, Broc Nelson praised its integration of post-metal, blackgaze, and doom-metal elements.

== Musical style ==
Corridoré's music has been described as atmospheric blackened post-metal. Scott Gordon of Tone Madison characterized the band's early work by its extended and unconventional song structures, contrasts between violent and calm passages, and combination of black metal with post-rock. Max Allison of the River Cities' Reader also noted the self-titled album's use of tremolo-picked guitars, blast beats, atmospheric interludes, and contrasts between extended heavy and textural sections. In his review of the debut, Jerabek emphasized the band's sludgy post-metal sound and the way its quieter passages build into dense, layered climaxes.

== Members ==
=== Current members ===
- Eric Andraska – bass, vocals
- Matt Allen – guitar, vocals
- Russell Emerson Hall – guitar, vocals
- Nick Bartley – drums

=== Former members ===
- Drew Carlson – drums

== Discography ==
=== Studio albums ===
- Corridoré (2019, self-released)
- Abandon (2025, Hypaethral Records)

=== Demos ===
- Vanquish the Light of Day (2017)
