= From the Kettle Onto the Coil =

- Adult Swim's artwork for "From the Kettle Onto the Coil"

Single by Deafheaven
- Released: August 25, 2014
- Genre: Blackgaze; post-metal
- Length: 6:36
- Label: Williams Street
- Songwriters: George Clarke, Kerry McCoy

Deafheaven singles chronology
"Libertine Dissolves" / "Daedalus" (2011)	"From the Kettle Onto the Coil" (2014)	"Brought to the Water" (2015)

Alternate cover
- Deafheaven's artwork for "From the Kettle Onto the Coil"

"From the Kettle Onto the Coil" is a single by the American post-black metal band Deafheaven. The song was released as a free download on August 25, 2014 through Williams Street Records as a part of the cable network Adult Swim's 2014 weekly singles series. Deafheaven began performing the song live ahead of the single's release, as early as July 2014.

== Writing ==
Adult Swim reached out to Deafheaven and asked if the band would create a song for its upcoming singles series. The band wrote a song that was meant to stand alone and would not necessarily be viewed as a sign of what a follow-up to its 2013 sophomore album Sunbather might sound like, though at the time of "From the Kettle Onto the Coil"'s release, vocalist George Clarke said Deafheaven had, "a lot of different ideas for that, already." Clarke elaborated: "This is just a single, and it kind of follows the same formula as the last record. It's definitely us. Maybe it's a sort of in-between song, but I wanted to do the best I could, and I think with the lead melodies that it has, it'll be a welcomed new song. It doesn't necessarily reflect our full progression as a band, but it's a really solid song."

On the single's lyrics and song title, Clarke described the song as being "kitchen inspired". The title of the song is a reference to water overflowing from a kettle and landing on the hot metal coil heating element of an electric stove, and lyrically the song represents the "stinging sensation" that occurs from this event.

== Reception ==
The song was met with critical acclaim. Writing for Spin, Colin Stutz said: "The heavy-hitting 'From the Kettle Onto the Coil' is a devastating six-and-a-half-minute assault that dips into vibier moments but never loses its edge in its relentless attack, a welcome follow-up to the gloriously shredded Sunbather." Writing for Exclaim!, Alex Hudson wrote: "The song is a venomous scorcher, its crushing drums and climactic guitars making the first couple of minutes feel like a continuous crescendo. Eventually the arrangement shifts into head banging riffs, dramatically slow rhythms and a mellow middle passage, with frontman George Clarke's throat-tearing screams sounding particularly terrifying." Writing for Consequence of Sound, Chris Coplan wrote: "After re-invigorating the black metal scene with last year's excellent Sunbather LP, Deafheaven return to basics with this latest single. The furious percussion and wailing guitars still crunch with similar monstrous intensity, but George Clarke's snarling vocals make the whole thing feel more raw and primalistic. There's some soaring tendencies ala Sunbather, but the band prove they absolutely smash when they want to."
