= Ordinary Corrupt Human Love =

Studio album by Deafheaven
- Released: July 13, 2018
- Recorded: February 2018
- Studios: 25th Street (Oakland, California)
- Genres: Blackgaze; post-metal
- Length: 61:36
- Labels: Anti- Republic (digital)
- Producer: Jack Shirley

Deafheaven chronology
New Bermuda (2015)	Ordinary Corrupt Human Love (2018)	10 Years Gone (2020)

Singles from Ordinary Corrupt Human Love
- 1. "Honeycomb" Released: April 18, 2018; 2. "Canary Yellow" Released: June 12, 2018

Ordinary Corrupt Human Love is the fourth studio album by American band Deafheaven, released on July 13, 2018, through Anti-. The title of the album was inspired by Graham Greene's 1951 novel The End of the Affair.

== Release and promotion ==
On January 30, 2018, Deafheaven posted on social media a photo of the members recording the album in a studio, and later confirmed to Pitchfork that they were working on a new album at 25th Street Recording in Oakland, California, with longtime collaborator and producer Jack Shirley. They released the lead single of the album, "Honeycomb", on April 18, 2018, and announced the album and its accompanying tour the following day. The second single, "Canary Yellow", was released on June 12. The album was made available for streaming exclusively on NPR on July 5, before being officially released on July 13 on CD, vinyl, digital download and streaming services via Anti-.

== Critical reception ==
Professional ratings
Aggregate scores
Source	Rating
AnyDecentMusic?	8.3/10
Metacritic	85/100
Review scores
Source	Rating
AllMusic	4/5 stars
The A.V. Club	B+
Consequence of Sound	A−
The Guardian	5/5 stars
Kerrang!	4/5
NME	4/5 stars
Pitchfork	8.5/10
Q	4/5 stars
Rolling Stone	4/5 stars
The Skinny	5/5 stars

At Metacritic, which assigns a normalized rating out of 100 to reviews from mainstream publications, Ordinary Corrupt Human Love received an average score of 85 based on 26 reviews, indicating "universal acclaim".

Evan Lilly of The Line of Best Fit wrote, "Ordinary Corrupt Human Love is not perfect, but Deafheaven remain captivating," further stating: "While embracing their black metal roots, Deafheaven tap into their gentler and more experimental side of songwriting by creating one of this year’s richest, most cinematic metal albums." DIY critic Will Richards opined, "Deafheaven finally look comfortable in their many different skins, their opposing worlds gliding together seamlessly," and stated that the album "repositions the band as a genreless powerhouse, and solidifies their status as indie mainstream minglers." TJ Kliebhan of Consequence of Sound said the album has "moving, emotional pieces and sharp performances bolstered by a band clearly stretching out of its comfort zone successfully," continuing: "The album is a refreshing new shade of their sound without abandoning the band's core mechanics." NME's James McMahon wrote, "Deafheaven's brilliance has long been hung upon the pursuit of a truth, like documentarians before they hit the edit suite. These songs are filthy, dank, often devoid of light, but like a weed emerging from a pavement's crack, there's something resembling hope there. A suggestion that maybe there's something more."

=== Accolades ===
Accolades for Ordinary Corrupt Human Love
Publication	Accolade	Rank	Ref.
Consequence of Sound	Top 25 Metal + Hard Rock albums of 2018	3	
Decibel	Decibel's Top 40 Albums of 2018	14	
Phoenix New Times	10 Best Heavy Music Albums of 2018	unranked	
Pitchfork	Pitchfork's 50 Best Albums of 2018	28	
Rolling Stone	20 Best Metal Albums of 2018	5	

== Track listing ==
All tracks are written by George Clarke and Kerry McCoy.

No.	Title	Length
1.	"You Without End"	7:36
2.	"Honeycomb"	11:04
3.	"Canary Yellow"	12:17
4.	"Near"	5:28
5.	"Glint"	10:57
6.	"Night People"	4:07
7.	"Worthless Animal"	10:07
Total length:		61:36

Notes

- "You Without End" features spoken words by Nadia Kury, taken from excerpts of the short story Black and Borax by Tom McElravey.
- "Night People" features additional vocals and production by Chelsea Wolfe and Ben Chisholm.

== Personnel ==
Credits adapted from the liner notes of Ordinary Corrupt Human Love.

Deafheaven

- George Clarke
- Kerry McCoy
- Daniel Tracy
- Shiv Mehra
- Chris Johnson

Additional personnel

- Jack Shirley – production, engineering, mixing, mastering
- Nadia Kury – spoken words (track 1)
- Chelsea Wolfe – additional vocals, additional production (track 6)
- Ben Chisholm – additional vocals, additional production (track 6)
- Nick Steinhardt – art direction, design
- Sean Stout – photography

== Charts ==
Chart performance for Ordinary Corrupt Human Love
Chart (2018)	Peak position
Australian Albums (ARIA)	54
Belgian Albums (Ultratop Flanders)	90
Dutch Albums (Album Top 100)	162
German Albums (Offizielle Top 100)	23
Scottish Albums (Official Charts)	47
UK Albums (Official Charts)	99
UK Rock & Metal Albums (Official Charts)	4
US Billboard 200	111
US Independent Albums (Billboard)	4
US Indie Store Album Sales (Billboard)	2
US Top Hard Rock Albums (Billboard)	5
US Top Rock Albums (Billboard)	18
