= Infinite Granite =

Studio album by Deafheaven
- Released: August 20, 2021
- Recorded: August–October 2020
- Studios: Atomic Garden East (Oakland, California); Electric Bunker (Boston); Chez JMJ (Glendale, California)
- Genres: Shoegaze; post-rock
- Length: 53:30
- Label: Sargent House
- Producer: Justin Meldal-Johnsen

Deafheaven chronology
10 Years Gone (2020)	Infinite Granite (2021)	Lonely People with Power (2025)

Singles from Infinite Granite
- 1. "Great Mass of Color" Released: June 9, 2021; 2. "The Gnashing" Released: July 8, 2021; 3. "In Blur" Released: August 4, 2021

Infinite Granite is the fifth studio album by American band Deafheaven, released on August 20, 2021, through Sargent House. The album represents a departure from the black metal influences of the band's previous albums, and a shift toward a shoegaze style with mostly clean vocals from frontman George Clarke.

== Recording ==
The album was produced by Justin Meldal-Johnsen, and was recorded with longtime Deafheaven producer and engineer Jack Shirley primarily at his Atomic Garden East studio in Oakland, California.

== Release ==
On June 9, 2021, Deafheaven announced Infinite Granite, simultaneously releasing its lead single, "Great Mass of Color". A second single, "The Gnashing", was released on July 8, 2021. A third and final single, "In Blur", was released on August 4, 2021. Infinite Granite was released by Sargent House on August 20, 2021.

== Music ==
The album stylistically strays away from the black metal sound of the band's previous releases. AllMusic said that the album was "decidedly closer to a dream pop record than something likely to receive airplay on mainstream rock stations, and there's still a dark undercurrent to its autumnal mood." The site also said the album's style could be described as "alternative-prog" comparing it to the works of the Smashing Pumpkins and Porcupine Tree.

== Critical reception ==
Professional ratings
Aggregate scores
Source	Rating
AnyDecentMusic?	7.7/10
Metacritic	82/100
Review scores
Source	Rating
AllMusic	3.5/5 stars
The A.V. Club	B−
Consequence	A−
Exclaim!	8/10
The Guardian	5/5 stars
Kerrang!	4/5
The Line of Best Fit	9/10
Metal Hammer	3/5 stars
NME	4/5 stars
Pitchfork	6.5/10

At Metacritic, which assigns a normalized rating out of 100 to reviews from mainstream publications, Infinite Granite received an average score of 82 based on 21 reviews, indicating "universal acclaim".

In a perfect 5/5 star review, Michael Hann of The Guardian called Infinite Granite a "great, great album, one that exists entirely on its creators' terms". Hann also praised drummer Daniel Tracy, writing, "he is what gives this record its power – his fills and patterns give Infinite Granite attack that never wavers, even when the music is at its most melodic". In a 9/10 review, Marie Oleinik of The Line of Best Fit felt the album "reinstates that less is, in fact, more". Jem Aswad of Variety wrote that the band "continues their progression as one of the most innovative and powerful rock acts of the past 20 years". Elizabeth Aubrey of NME called it the band's "most ambitious and cohesive album to date and embracing their shoegaze selves brings renewal: for a band known for torment and chaos, it's a joy to hear them sounding so hopeful". Chris Bryson of Exclaim! wrote, "In its lyrics and tone, Infinite Granite is remarkably blue, and beautifully so. Some fans might not appreciate the direction the band has taken towards the light, but nevertheless, the heart of Deafheaven remains".

In a less favorable review, David Weaver of Clash wrote, "There are some real moments of beauty on the record - 'In Blur' aches and sparkles, whilst singles 'Great Mass Of Colour' and 'The Gnashing' showcase a band adept at building beautiful soundscapes even with the guitars turned down - but at a certain point, the album suffers from the lack of depth in Clarke's vocals, or range in his melodies." A.A. Dowd of The A.V. Club agreed, writing, "Here, we get only the beauty: a long, indistinguishable blur of pleasure." Christina Wenig of Metal Hammer praised the album's songwriting and production and the band for attempting to change their sound, but ultimately felt that "somewhere along the way, Deafheaven have lost some of the intensity that had previously made them irresistible".

=== Accolades ===
Infinite Granite on year-end lists
Publication	List	Rank	Ref.
Consequence	Top 30 Metal & Hard Rock Albums	15	
Decibel	Top 40 Albums of 2021	25	
The Economist	The best albums of 2021	—	
The Fader	The 50 best albums of 2021	44	
The Guardian	The 50 best albums of 2021	16	
Kerrang!	The 50 Best Albums of 2021	47	
Paste	The 50 Best Albums of 2021	27	
PopMatters	The 75 Best Albums of 2021	12	

== Track listing ==
All lyrics are written by George Clarke; all music is composed by Deafheaven.

No.	Title	Length
1.	"Shellstar"	6:06
2.	"In Blur"	5:29
3.	"Great Mass of Color"	6:00
4.	"Neptune Raining Diamonds"	3:05
5.	"Lament for Wasps"	7:08
6.	"Villain"	5:41
7.	"The Gnashing"	5:34
8.	"Other Language"	6:10
9.	"Mombasa"	8:17
Total length:		53:30

== Personnel ==
Credits adapted from the liner notes of Infinite Granite.

Deafheaven

- George Clarke – vocals (tracks 1–3, 5–9)
- Kerry McCoy – guitars (tracks 1–3, 5–9), vocals (tracks 1, 9), synthesizers (tracks 4, 5, 8)
- Shiv Mehra – guitars, synthesizers (all tracks); vocals (tracks 1–3, 5–7, 9), acoustic guitar (track 9)
- Chris Johnson – bass guitar (tracks 1–3, 5–9), vocals (tracks 1–3, 5–7, 9)
- Daniel Tracy – drums, percussion (tracks 1–3, 5–9); vocals (tracks 1, 2)

Additional personnel

- Justin Meldal-Johnsen – production, engineering, Fender Bass VI (track 2), additional vocals (tracks 3, 8, 9), additional synthesizers (tracks 4, 6, 8), additional guitar (track 9)
- Chelsea Jade – additional vocals (tracks 3, 9)
- Jack Shirley – engineering
- Darrell Thorp – mixing, engineering
- Brendan Dekora – engineering
- Chris Johnson – engineering
- Joshua Lago – assistant engineering
- Dave Cooley – mastering
- Nick Steinhardt, 23in – art direction and design

== Charts ==
Chart performance for Infinite Granite
Chart (2021)	Peak position
Australian Hitseekers Albums (ARIA)	7
Belgian Albums (Ultratop Flanders)	97
German Albums (Offizielle Top 100)	17
Scottish Albums (Official Charts)	17
Swiss Albums (Schweizer Hitparade)	55
UK Album Downloads (Official Charts)	12
UK Independent Albums (Official Charts)	10
US Billboard 200	130
US Independent Albums (Billboard)	20
US Top Alternative Albums (Billboard)	12
US Top Rock Albums (Billboard)	19
