= Sunbather (album) =

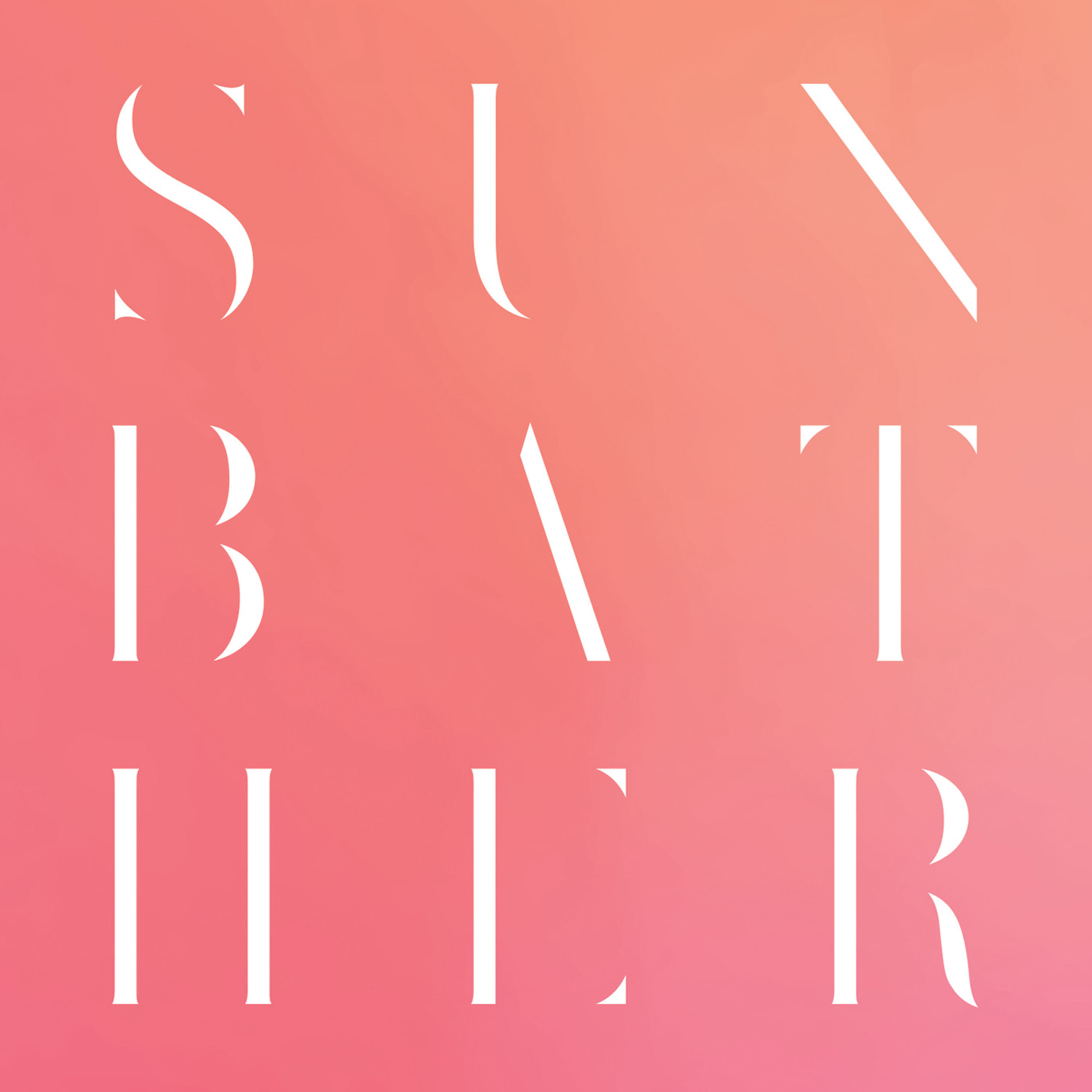

Studio album by Deafheaven
- Released: June 11, 2013
- Recorded: January 2013
- Studios: Atomic Garden Studios in East Palo Alto, California
- Genres: Blackgaze; post-metal; atmospheric black metal
- Length: 59:58
- Label: Deathwish (DW146)
- Producers: Jack Shirley; Deafheaven

Deafheaven chronology
Deafheaven / Bosse-de-Nage (2012)	Sunbather (2013)	New Bermuda (2015)

Sunbather is the second studio album by the American metal band Deafheaven. After the release of their debut record Roads to Judah, the then two piece group consisting of George Clarke and Kerry McCoy began work on Sunbather under the label Deathwish and recorded in several days in January 2013. The recording process brought a third member into the fold with drummer Dan Tracy who would go on to become a permanent fixture of the band. The album was recorded in The Atomic Garden Recording Studio, owned by Jack Shirley who had been a long time producer of the band.

Although Deafheaven had been strongly influenced by black metal as well as other diverse metal acts, their music drew comparisons from music critics to shoegaze, post-rock, and alternative rock sounds. This trend was further continued on Sunbather. The melancholic songs featured in the album include Wall of Sound arrangements that are found in many shoegazing and post-rock acts, producing dense sounds that sometimes breakdown into slower, melodic parts that are then topped with vocalist George Clarke's reverb-soaked screaming style singing of lyrics. The album also contains a few interludes that include sampling, field recording, and droning.

Sunbather was released in June 2013 and received universal critical acclaim, with Metacritic acknowledging it as "the best-reviewed major album" of the year. It has since been ranked as one of the best albums of the 2010s.

== Background ==
Deafheaven began as a band with vocalist George Clarke and guitarist Kerry McCoy as the two core musicians and songwriters. After getting the attention of record label Deathwish's co-founder Tre McCarthy when he found Deafheaven's untitled demo on the internet, the band was signed to its first record label. Despite being plagued with an inconsistent group line up since the inception of the band, Deafheaven were able to record their debut album Roads to Judah as a quintet. The album was met with favorable reviews noting its dynamic influences, such as music reviewing publication Pitchfork proclaiming that it "blends shredding West Coast black metal, Explosions in the Sky dynamics, a healthy My Bloody Valentine infatuation, a floor-punching hardcore sensibility, and anguished (but romantic) vocal eruptions by clean-cut frontman George Clarke."

Following a live album and a split EP release after Roads to Judah, the band was again a duo composed of Clarke and McCoy as the sole songwriters. As early as September 2011, Deafheaven announced it was recording music for a new release, with McCoy describing the material as "faster, darker, a lot heavier and far more experimental" than their debut album. As the band was nearing the recording date of Sunbather by December 2012 however, Clarke described their new material as less melancholic and less centered around black metal, but rather featuring a more "lush and rock-driven, even pop-driven" sound at times.

== Recording and production ==
After writing the entirety of Sunbather in an apartment Clarke and McCoy occupied in the year before its release, the two members went to record their work at Atomic Garden Studios in East Palo Alto. Although the duo discussed various different producers to work with, their decision came down to Jack Shirley who was valued for the comfort he gave the band since he had worked on all their previous records. On Shirley's performance as producer, Clarke said, "for this record, he definitely took on the role of producer much more than our previous efforts, which was awesome. It honestly felt like we accomplished this together and it felt great.". The recording process took six days in January 2013 with each day focusing mostly on recording specific instrumental tracks or completing album interludes. Each day of recording took approximately eight hours of work.

When the band recorded Roads to Judah, the members did not make production part of their main focus. As a result, Clarke and McCoy wanted Sunbather to sound "bigger and slicker" than previous releases. Musician Dan Tracy was brought in to work on the drumming. Noting Tracy's proficiency with percussion, Clarke detailed, "For me, drums have always been a bit of an afterthought which is strange because they certainly shape our sound, but as long as they were fast, I didn't care much otherwise. That is definitely not the case with this record. There are sections where drums absolutely make the song pop, which is a huge development." Tracy began work on the first day by recording the bulk of the percussion and concluding his contributions for two more hours on the second day using a four piece DW kit. The microphones used to record the drums varied depending on the role of the percussion in different parts of a track. Uptempo drum parts were recorded with closer microphones while "spacier sections" were recorded with ribbon microphones.

Guitar work was started on the second day with most of the day consisting of recording distorted guitar parts. Using a Gibson Les Paul, McCoy would typically track four guitar layers, tracking each rhythm and lead twice. Several different guitar pedals were used for distortion guitar to allow the "bigger and slicker" vision Deafheaven had for the record in conjunction with frequent use of a whammy bar to create a "dizzying effect" inspired by My Bloody Valentine's "glide guitar" technique. The following day began with recording bass guitar using a 1970s Fender Precision Bass model and quickly concluded to start on clean guitar parts. Although McCoy played a Les Paul for some of these parts, a Gretsch 6117 model was mostly used on the recording, and again up to four guitar tracks were made for different parts. On recording the clean guitars, Clarke notes, "recording always becomes fun around this time because the stressful bulk is completed and we're able to really experiment with different sounds and space, even using an EBow for the first time."

The next two days focused on clean sections and interludes. For these parts, a Kawai upright piano was employed as well as a 1960s Hammond M3 organ. The sixth and last day of recording involves small additions to the record and Clarke's vocals. To fit the sound aesthetic of the album, the vocal tracks were given echo chamber reverberation treatment during the mixing process. With the recordings finished, producer Jack Shirley continued work by mixing and mastering to finish the album. Sunbather was recorded on two-inch analog tape and converted to digital for final production to be done through Pro Tools before finally being mastered with an Ampex ATR-102 tape machine.

== Music and lyrics ==
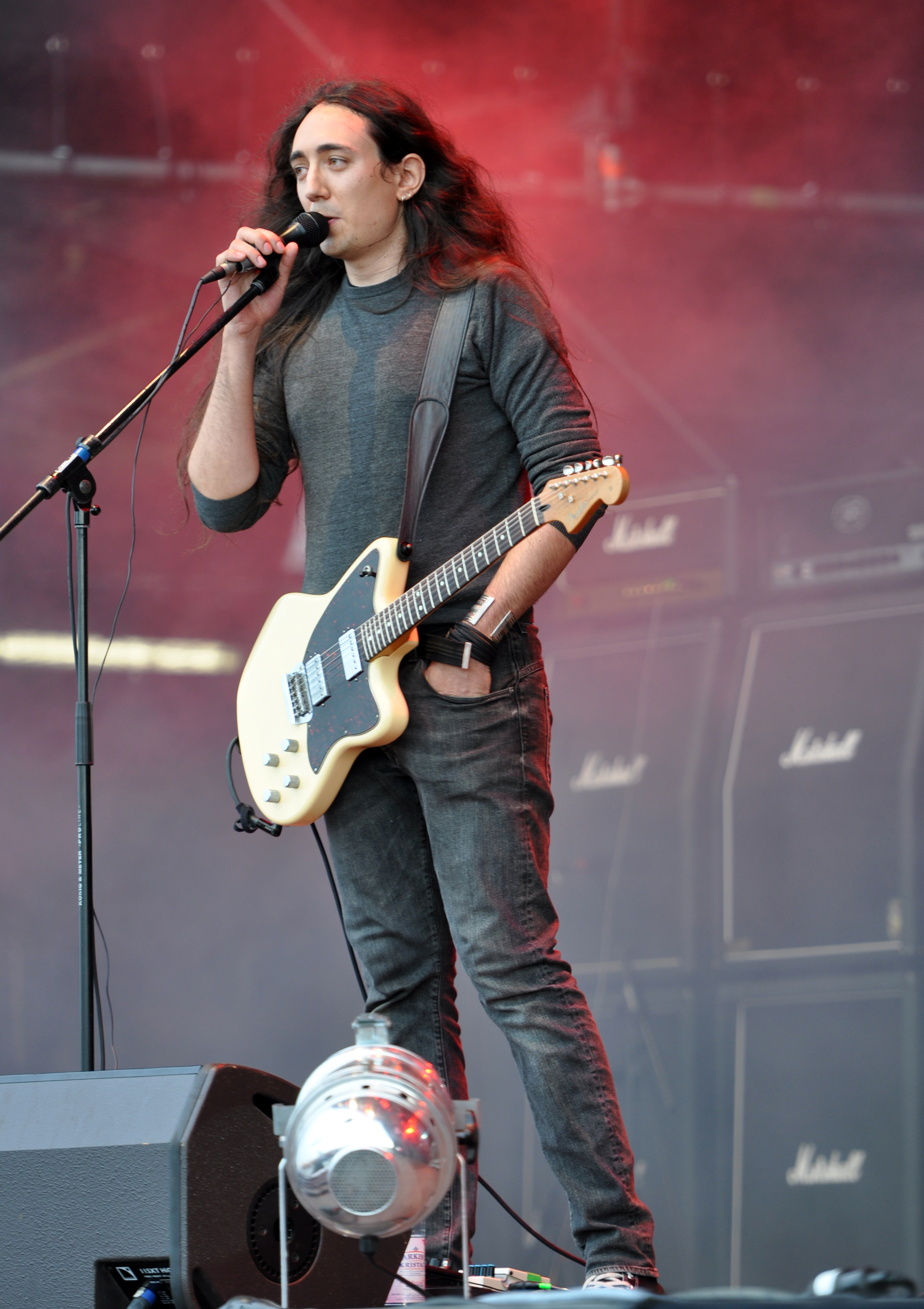
The interlude, "Please Remember", features spoken word contributions from Alcest member Neige.

Sunbather is a blackgaze, post-metal, and atmospheric black metal album; it contains seven tracks: four songs ("Dream House", "Sunbather", "Vertigo" and "The Pecan Tree") and three interludes ("Irresistible", "Please Remember" and "Windows"). The decision to weave shorter interlude tracks in between longer songs was made in the studio. Kerry McCoy wrote many riffs prior to the Sunbather-studio sessions, some of which featured a more clean guitar tone, and Deafheaven wanted to make use of them in some fashion. George Clarke commented, "Some of the things [McCoy] was writing weren't fitting into anything in particular—they were their own little pieces. And so rather than trying to exhaust them in a longer song, we thought, 'We don't want to waste these riffs; maybe we could use them as interludes.'" Clarke also said the interludes are meant to aid the flow of the album by complementing other songs and that Sunbather is meant to be listened to "in one sitting all the way through." In categorizing Sunbather, Metal Hammer noted it had many influences and an "emotional palette" to the point where it wasn't a black metal record; the source compared its emotionalizing of extreme metal music tropes to the work of Amesoeurs and Alcest and its cinematic soundscapes to the works of The Cure, Mogwai, and Russian Circles.

The first interlude, "Irresistible", is completely instrumental, but the other two tracks feature samples and guest vocals layered over comparatively softer, cleaner sounding music. The track "Please Remember" features guest contributions from Stéphane "Neige" Paut of Alcest reading a passage from Milan Kundera's 1984 novel, The Unbearable Lightness of Being. Deafheaven met and became friends with Alcest when they toured together in March 2012, and wanted to collaborate musically. Originally, Paut was to contribute guest guitars, but because he lives in France and the distance makes musical collaboration difficult, he recorded himself reading the passage chosen by Deafheaven and sent that instead. The Unbearable Lightness of Being is one of Clarke's favorite books and he said that, "That passage is really important to me. It just screams insecurity, which I have huge faults with." The final interlude, "Windows", features two interlacing audio samples. The first is a recording of McCoy during a drug deal. Around the time of recording Sunbather, McCoy was addicted to pharmaceutical opiates and Clarke wanted to record one of his drug deals to include something that was very personal to his fellow band member. The second is a live recording of preacher in downtown San Francisco, California, about which Clarke said, "they're there all the time, yelling at crowds." (Cf. John Adam's Christian Zeal and Activity.) Clarke commented on the content of "Windows", stating: "Thematically, it's supposed to be about this guy talking about the evils of hell intermixed with one's own personal hell and the actual realities like addiction and self-worth, not the fire and brimstone. [McCoy] didn't have a lot of money, and he was kind of desperate; he's showcasing the true horrors that are here on earth—one's own personal demons."

Wealth disparity is a reoccurring theme in the album's lyrics, though Clarke's view of the album is "apolitical and more focused on emotion and internal feelings, and adjusting to the realities of adulthood." According to Clarke, "Dream House" was written about "the obsession with wealth", and the lyrics came from his feelings of jealousy over seeing other people's San Francisco houses as "a symbol of everything I don’t have." Its outro lyrics were drawn from a text conversation that Clarke had with "this girl I was totally in love with." The title track is about income inequality in San Francisco, which Clarke contemplated while driving around San Luis Obispo while living in one of the area's poorer neighborhoods. "The Pecan Tree" touches upon Clarke's strained relationship with his father.

== Artwork and title ==
The cover artwork for Sunbather was designed by Nick Steinhardt of Touché Amoré, who also designed the band's 2011 debut album Roads to Judah. The original photograph is credited to Ryan Aylsworth. The pink and orange colors on the cover are meant to resemble the color seen on the inside of one's eyelids when lying in the sun. The inspiration to have the title Sunbather written out in a simple, block formation was drawn from Pulp's 2001 album We Love Life. George Clarke named the album "Sunbather" because, "that's the feeling it gives me. It is the sadness and the frustration and the anger that comes with striving for perfection. Dreaming of warmth and love despite the pain of idealism." He recalled watching a woman in a wealthy neighborhood sunbathing on her front lawn and juxtaposed her life with his as an uneducated, poor, struggling 22-year-old.

== Critical reception and legacy ==
Professional ratings
Aggregate scores
Source	Rating
AnyDecentMusic?	8.8/10
Metacritic	92/100
Review scores
Source	Rating
AllMusic	5/5 stars
The A.V. Club	A
Consequence of Sound	A−
Decibel	9/10
Exclaim!	9/10
Kerrang!	4/5 stars
Pitchfork	8.9/10
PopMatters	9/10
Rolling Stone	3/5 stars
Spin	8/10

Sunbather was met with widespread critical acclaim. At Metacritic, which assigns a normalized rating out of 100 to reviews from mainstream critics, the album received an average score of 92, based on 18 reviews, which indicates "universal acclaim". The album's varying compositional techniques and styles garnered it much buzz with non-metal journalists and listeners, especially with indie music publications due to its shoegaze and post-rock stylings. As Clarke responded to the reception, "Even on the positive side, when we'd get a review or a write-up or something and people were like, you know, 'this album is amazing' and 'it's breaking so much ground' and all this kind of stuff — that's almost harder to read than the negative stuff sometimes. Because we always feel like, you know what? It's just a band, and it's just songs."

Consequence of Sound claimed Sunbather was better than Roads to Judah for being more dynamic and rejecting the "awkward gait and busy feel" of the 2011 album. The dynamics were also praised by The A.V. Club for being "masterful[ly]" done and making it less redundant than most other black metal records. AllMusic noted another positive distinction from similar albums with Sunbather, the lyrics' light "poetic exploration" of otherwise dark subject matter, which "gives the listener time to really internalize and reflect upon the lyrics rather than react viscerally, making for an altogether deeper experience for those willing to take the time to really take the album in." The main praise in Spin's review was the album's difficult feat to unite elements of previously established styles with "unwavering focus and unfaltering vision," suggesting it was great for listeners "to connect, to see our collective or individual anxieties massaged into something we can stream from the comfort of our homes."

Writing for Pitchfork, Brandon Stosuy labeled Sunbather "Best New Album" and stated: "With Sunbather, Deafheaven have made one of the biggest albums of the year, one that impresses you with its scale, the way Swans' The Seer did last year. Like M. Gira's masterpiece, it has the ability to capture the attention of people who don't normally listen to heavy music."

Upon the genre's creation, blackgaze was initially panned by fans of traditional black metal and heavy metal. However, with the success of Sunbather, this criticism was soon overshadowed and has since been considered as a definitive release for the genre. The album's success also gave the band much more widespread appeal, playing in several mainstream festivals where the band is usually the only metal-oriented act.

=== Accolades ===
Sunbather's critical acclaim has led the album to be listed on several critic's "Best of 2013" lists, both in the US and internationally. Prior to the album's release, Sunbather was listed as an anticipated album of 2013 by Decibel, Noisecreep, The Skinny, Spin and Stereogum. In mid-2013, Spin, NPR and Metacritic declared the album to be one of the best albums of the year "thus far". Metacritic also declared that Sunbather was the best-reviewed album of 2013. Further, they wrote: "It's the first time a metal album has occupied the #1 slot in our year-end rankings. In fact, out of albums with 15 or more reviews (excluding EPs and reissues), Sunbather is now the 7th-highest scoring album in our database, which includes releases dating back to 1999." A "—" denotes the publication's list is in no particular order, and Sunbather did not rank numerically.

==== Year-end lists ====
Publication	Country	Work	Accolade	Year	Rank
The 405	UK	Sunbather	Albums of the Year 2013	2013	6
Clash	UK	Sunbather	Top Albums Of 2013	2013	37
Consequence of Sound	US	Sunbather	Top 50 Albums of 2013	2013	20
Complex	US	Sunbather	The 50 Best Albums of 2013	2013	31
Crack Magazine	UK	Sunbather	Albums of the Year	2013	5
The Daily Beast	US	Sunbather	The 13 Best Albums of 2013	2013	11
Drowned in Sound	UK	Sunbather	Favourite Albums of 2013	2013	31
FasterLouder	Australia	Sunbather	Top 50 Albums of 2013	2013	33
musicOMH	UK	Sunbather	Top 100 Albums of 2013	2013	92
No Ripcord	US	Sunbather	Top 50 Albums of 2013	2013	30
NPR Music	US	Sunbather	50 Favorite Albums Of 2013	2013	Unranked
PopMatters	International	Sunbather	The 75 Best Albums of 2013	2013	39
PopMatters	International	Sunbather	The Best Indie Rock of 2013	2013	8
Pretty Much Amazing	US	Sunbather	40 Best Albums of 2013	2013	34
Spin	US	Sunbather	50 Best Albums of 2013	2013	22
Stereogum	US	Sunbather	The 50 Best Albums of 2013	2013	2
Time Out London	UK	Sunbather	The 40 Best Albums of 2013	2013	38
Rock Sound	UK	Sunbather	The 50 Best Albums of 2013	2013	13
The A.V. Club	US	Sunbather	The 23 Best Albums of 2013	2013	3
Exclaim!	Canada	Sunbather	Top 10 Metal & Hardcore Albums of 2013	2013	4
Spin	US	Sunbather	20 Best Metal Albums of 2013	2013	1
NPR	US	Sunbather	NPR Music's 50 Favorite Albums of 2013	2013	—
Stereogum	US	Sunbather	The 50 Best Metal Albums of 2013	2013	1
Rolling Stone	US	Sunbather	20 Best Metal Albums of 2013	2013	1
Pitchfork	US	Sunbather	Top 50 Albums of 2013	2013	6
Treble	US	Sunbather	50 Best Albums of 2013	2013	1
Metacritic	International	Sunbather	The Best Albums of 2013	2013	1
Metacritic	International	Sunbather	2013 Music Critic Top Ten Lists	2013	16
Sputnikmusic	US	Sunbather	Top 50 Albums of 2013	2013	3
AbsolutePunk	US	Sunbather	Top 30 Albums of 2013	2013	6
Decibel	US	Sunbather	Top 40 Albums of 2013	2013	11
ChartAttack	Canada	Sunbather	The Albums That Defined Indie Music in 2013	2013	—
Pitchfork	US	Sunbather	The Top 40 Metal Albums of 2013	2013	1

==== Decade-end lists ====
Publication	Country	Work	Accolade	Year	Rank
The A.V. Club	US	Sunbather	The 50 Best Albums of the 2010s	2019	19
AllMusic	US	Sunbather	Decade In Review	2019	Unranked
Consequence of Sound	US	Sunbather	Top 100 Albums of the 2010s	2019	40
Consequence of Sound	US	Sunbather	Top 25 Metal Albums of the 2010s	2019	3
Crack Magazine	UK	Sunbather	The Top 100 Albums of the Decade	2019	34
Kerrang!	UK	Sunbather	The 75 Best Albums Of The 2010s	2019	6
Noisey	UK	Sunbather	The 100 Best Albums of the 2010s	2019	36
Paste	US	Sunbather	The 100 Best Albums of the 2010s	2019	97
Pitchfork	US	Sunbather	The 100 Best Albums of the Decade So Far (2010–2014)	2014	26
Pitchfork	US	Sunbather	The 200 Best Albums of the 2010s	2019	123
Revolver	US	Sunbather	25 Best Albums of the 2010s	2019	7
Stereogum	US	Sunbather	The 100 Best Albums Of The 2010s	2019	25
Treble	US	Sunbather	Top 150 Albums of the 2010s	2020	8

==== All-time lists ====
Publication	Country	Work	Accolade	Year	Rank
Rolling Stone	US	Sunbather	The 100 Greatest Metal Albums of All Time	2017	94

==== Tracks ====
Publication	Country	Work	Accolade	Year	Rank
PopMatters	International	"Dream House"	The 75 Best Songs of 2013	2013	25
Consequence of Sound	US	"Dream House"	Top 50 Songs of 2013	2013	18
Rolling Stone	US	"Dream House"	100 Best Songs of 2013	2013	92
Pitchfork	US	"Dream House"	The Top 100 Tracks of 2013	2013	9
ChartAttack	Canada	"Sunbather"	50 Best Songs of 2013	2013	—
Pitchfork	US	cover art	The Top 25 Album Covers of 2013	2013	Unranked

== Commercial performance ==
The album debuted at No. 130 on the Billboard 200 and at No. 10 in the Hard Rock Albums chart with 3,720 copies sold in its debut week in the US. The album had sold over 30,000 copies in the US as of April 2014.

== Track listing ==
All music and lyrics by Deafheaven.

Sunbather track listing
No.	Title	Length
1.	"Dream House"	9:15
2.	"Irresistible"	3:13
3.	"Sunbather"	10:17
4.	"Please Remember"	6:26
5.	"Vertigo"	14:37
6.	"Windows"	4:43
7.	"The Pecan Tree"	11:27
Total length:		59:58

Japanese bonus track
No.	Title	Length
8.	"Punk Rock / Cody" (Mogwai cover)	10:37
Total length:		70:35

== Personnel ==
Sunbather personnel adapted from liner notes.

Deafheaven

- George Clarke – vocals, piano
- Kerry McCoy – guitars, bass
- Daniel Tracy – drums

Additional personnel

- Stéphane "Neige" Paut (Alcest) – spoken word on "Please Remember"

Production and recording

- Deafheaven – production
- Jack Shirley – recording, production, editing, mixing, mastering

Artwork and design

- Ryan Aylsworth – photography
- Sara Mohr – model
- Nick Steinhardt (Touché Amoré) – art direction, design

== Charts ==
Chart performance for Sunbather
Chart (2013)	Peak position
US Billboard 200	130
US Independent Albums (Billboard)	23
US Indie Store Album Sales (Billboard)	18
US Top Hard Rock Albums (Billboard)	10
US Top Rock Albums (Billboard)	40
