= 25th Street Recording =

Recording studio in Oakland, California

General Information
- Type: Recording Studio
- Location: Oakland, California
- Country: United States
- Dates Active: 2010–12 (Built) 2012 (Opened) – Present
- Hardware: Studio A API Vision Studio B SSL AWS 900 +
- Software: Pro Tools HD
- Website: Official Website

25th Street Recording is a music recording studio in Oakland, California, United States.

25th Street Recording was created by David Lichtenstein (son of American artist Roy Lichtenstein) inside the Jack Little British Car Service building in Oakland, California. 25th Street Recording was designed by studio architect Francis Manzella and was built by Dennis Stearns. Manzella is known for other large format studios including Guilford Sound and Studio at the Palms.

== Background ==
25th Street was built to serve the thriving music and arts scene in the East Bay area. The idea to build the studio came after its owner recorded a full-length music project at other Bay Area studios. Shortly after the album was completed in 2010, a building was selected in concert with its architect to provide a venue that was appropriate to the necessary specialized building treatments, as well as a location that was easily accessible by a clientele of independent artists and producers from the area.

== Studios ==
25th Street Recording was built to be a single studio facility, but a second, smaller studio was added to increase the studio's capacity for mixing, editing, and production work. Work is currently underway to expand its mezzanine area as a secondary lounge and music production and editing area. 25th Street Recording's services include music production, recording, mixing, post-production, mastering and video production.

=== Studio A ===
Studio A comprises a large control room, 1,400 square foot live room, and two large iso rooms. The recording console in studio A is a 64 input API Vision surround recording and mixing console. The control room houses a large collection of antique and vintage and new outboard effects from EAR, Universal Audio, Fairchild Neve, Daking, Pultec, Tube Tech, AMS, EMT, DBX, and Empirical Labs among others. Studio A was built to accommodate surround sound music and film projects with its custom ATC 5.1 surround monitoring system. Video capability has been built into the facility to accommodate scoring sessions for film, TV, and game audio.

=== Studio B ===
Studio B was constructed in 2013 to increase session volume in the facility and serve as a production room for its staff and clients. Studio B or "The B Room" houses an SSL AWS 900+ console, Pro Tools HD Native, Lynx Aurora conversion, and a large number of synthesizers, virtual instruments and music production tools. Studio B can be connected to the spaces in Studio A to unitize the rooms and equipment in Studio A that is not being used.

=== Microphones and instruments ===
25th Street Recording houses a large collection of vintage and new microphones including models by Neumann, Brauner, AKG, B&K, Royer, Schoeps, Telefunken, Shure and RCA among others. Studio A houses a 1911 Steinway Model B Grand Piano, Hammond A100 organ with two Leslie speaker cabinets, guitar amps by Marshall, Mesa Boogie, Fender, and Bogner, and Drumkits by Eams, Pearl, and Ludwig.
