= Jack Shirley =

American record producer and musician

- Also known as: Grammy Jack
- Origin: Palo Alto, California, U.S.
- Genres: Punk rock, indie rock, pop, black metal
- Occupations: Record producer; engineer; musician
- Instrument: Guitar
- Years active: 2004–present
- Website: theatomicgarden.com

Jack Shirley is an American record producer, audio engineer and musician. He is known for his analog driven aesthetic, and work with eclectic artists, including Deafheaven, whose 2013 sophomore album Sunbather received widespread critical acclaim. Shirley also worked with various other music acts, including Jeff Rosenstock, Loma Prieta, Bosse-de-Nage, Punch, Whirr, Shinobu, La Bella, State Faults and Frameworks. Besides his production work, he plays guitar for the bands Comadre and Everybody Row.

Shirley is also the owner of The Atomic Garden Recording Studio, located in Oakland, California.

== Discography ==
=== With Comadre ===
- The Youth (2004)
- Burn Your Bones (2006)
- Comadre (2013)

=== With Everybody Row ===
- The Sea Inside EP (2014)

=== Production ===
- Commissure (band) – "Stars Could Care Less" (2009)
- Stress Relief – Demo (2010)
- Whirl – Distressor (2010)
- Deafheaven – Demo (2010)
- Magic Bullets – Untitled (2010)
- Dead Horses – Bukkakalypse Now (2010)
- Deafheaven – Roads to Judah (2011)
- Broadway Calls – Toxic Kids (2011)
- Whirr – June (2011)
- Beau Navire – Hours (2011)
- Whirr – Pipe Dreams (2012)
- Bocanegra – S/T (2012)
- Classics of Love – Classics of Love (2012)
- Loma Prieta – I.V. (2012)
- Beau Navire – Lumens (2012)
- Joyce Manor – Of All Things I Will Soon Grow Tired (2012)
- Whirr and Anne – Whirr / Anne (2012)
- Deafheaven and Bosse-de-Nage – Deafheaven / Bosse-de-Nage (2012)
- Deafheaven – Sunbather (2013)
- Calculator – This Will Come to Pass (2013)
- Whirr – Around (2013)
- State Faults – Resonate/Desperate (2013)
- Frameworks – Loom (2014)
- Happy Diving - Big World (2014)
- Whirr – Sway (2014)
- Linoleum Dream – Linoleum Dream EP (2014)
- Punch – They Don't Have to Believe (2014)
- Tørsö – 3 pezzi (2014)
- Tørsö – Community Psychosis (2014)
- Hard Girls – "A Thousand Surfaces" (2014)
- Hard Girls – "Floating Now" (2017)
- Loma Prieta – Self Portrait (2015)
- Deafheaven – New Bermuda (2015)
- Jeff Rosenstock – We Cool? (2015)
- Shinobu – 10 Thermidor (2015)
- Tørsö – Sono Pronta a Morire (2015)
- Crowhurst – Crowhurst (2015)
- Bosse-de-Nage – All Fours (2015)
- Wander (band) – Mourning (2016)
- VATS – Green Glass Room (2016)
- Telethon – Citrosis (2016)
- Super Unison – Auto (2016)
- Parenthesis - Quiet Desperation (2016)
- Oathbreaker – Rheia (2016)
- Jeff Rosenstock – WORRY. (2016)
- King Woman – Created in the Image of Suffering (2017)
- Remo Drive – Greatest Hits (2017)
- The Smith Street Band – More Scared of You Than You Are of Me (2017)
- Telethon – The Grand Spontanean (2017)
- Senegal Grindcore Mafia – Ido y Lúcido (2017)
- Amenra – MASS VI(European version) (2017)
- Wander – Glass(2017)
- SteveO and the Crippling Addictions – Desolation Monday (2018)
- Jeff Rosenstock – POST- (2018)
- Sahasrara – Lungo la costa ardente (2018)
- Deafheaven – Ordinary Corrupt Human Love (2018)
- Young Mountain – Lost Tree (2018)
- Bosse-de-Nage – Further Still (2018)
- Vestra – Arlés (2018)
- Gouge Away – Burnt Sugar (2018)
- Super Unison – Stella (2018)
- Tuscoma – Arkhitecturenominus (2018)
- Uroboros – Le rose est le nouveau noir (2018)
- Brainwreck – Charlie (2018)
- Elle – She (2018)
- Mains & Monitors – Kalani (2018)
- All Your Sisters – Trust Ruins (2018)
- Wander – March (2019)
- Tørsö – Build and Break (2019)
- Sea Of Orchids – Silvergirl (2019)
- Bad Visuals – Petaluma (2019)
- Telethon – Hard Pop (2019)
- State Faults – Clairvoyant (2019)
- Nuvolascura – Nuvolascura (2019)
- Jeff Rosenstock – Thanks, Sorry! (2019)
- Liotta Seoul – Hopper (2020)
- Western Addiction – Frail Bray (2020)
- Mamaleek – Come and See (2020)
- Jeff Rosenstock – NO DREAM (2020)
- Gulch – Impenetrable Cerebral Fortress (2020)
- Deafheaven – 10 Years Gone (2020)
- Jeff Rosenstock – SKA DREAM (2021)
- Pardoner – Came Down Different (2021)
- Justice Fetish – I Hope This Keeps You Up at Night (2021)
- Deafheaven – Infinite Granite (2021)
- Telethon – Swim Out Past The Breakers (2021)
- Toner - White Buffalo Roam (2021)
- Ex Pilots - Ex Pilots (2023)
- Jeromes Dream - The Gray In Between (2023)
- Home Is Where – The Whaler (2023)
- Sogno #3 – Øjne (2023)
- Jeff Rosenstock – HELLMODE (2023)
- Gouge Away – Deep Sage (2024)
- Telethon - Suburban Electric (2025)
- Lord Snow - Have You Heard of the High Elves (2025)
- Hetta - Acetate (2025)
- Gardenia - Gardenia (2026)
- Dahlia Cross - Deaths Have Benefits (2026)
- saoirse dream - grimdark (2026)
