= New Bermuda (album) =

Studio album by Deafheaven
- Released: October 2, 2015
- Recorded: April 2015
- Studios: 25th Street, Oakland, California; Atomic Garden, Palo Alto, California
- Genres: Blackgaze; post-metal
- Length: 46:35
- Label: Anti-
- Producer: Jack Shirley

Deafheaven chronology
Sunbather (2013)	New Bermuda (2015)	Ordinary Corrupt Human Love (2018)

Singles from New Bermuda
- 1. "Brought to the Water" Released: August 18, 2015; 2. "Come Back" Released: September 15, 2015

New Bermuda is the third studio album by American blackgaze band Deafheaven. It was released on October 2, 2015, through the Anti- record label.

== Background ==
The album was recorded live in April 2015 with Sunbather producer and engineer Jack Shirley at 25th Street Recording in Oakland, California and Atomic Garden Recording in Palo Alto, California. The cover art of the album features an oil painting by Allison Schulnik.

The album trailer was released on July 27, 2015. On August 18, 2015, the band shared the first track from the album, "Brought to the Water". On September 15, 2015, the band shared the track "Come Back" from the album. On September 23, 2015, the album became available for streaming on NPR's website.

== Critical reception ==
Professional ratings
Aggregate scores
Source	Rating
AnyDecentMusic?	7.9/10
Metacritic	85/100
Review scores
Source	Rating
AllMusic	4/5 stars
The A.V. Club	A−
Consequence of Sound	A−
Exclaim!	8/10
The Guardian	4/5 stars
Kerrang!	4/5
Pitchfork	9.0/10
Rolling Stone	3/5 stars
Spin	9/10
Uncut	7/10

New Bermuda was met with rave reviews from music critics. At Metacritic, which assigns a normalized rating out of 100 to reviews from mainstream critics, the album received an average score of 85, based on 17 reviews, which indicates "universal acclaim".

The A.V. Club reviewer David Anthony stated that the album "doesn't break down the walls of metal, instead it expands its confines, allowing Deafheaven to include subgenres that rarely mix while injecting more outside references." Anthony further considered New Bermuda as a proof of "how progressive of a genre metal can be, purists be damned." AllMusic critic Paul Simpson described the album as "a powerful, enrapturing experience", writing: "New Bermuda finds Deafheaven continuing to effortlessly traverse genre borders and create transcendent music." Sean Barry of Consequence of Sound thought that the album's "audacity and stylistic shifts may have resulted in an album that's not quite as much like coming home as Sunbather, but it shows a genuine and fascinating maturation in a band that deserves to remain in the spotlight for all the right reasons." Drowned in Sound's regarded the album as "a rather stupendous record from a band who may, now if not before, be on the verge of genuine greatness."

Josiah Hughes of Exclaim! described the record as "an album that blows Sunbather out of the water". Hughes further added: "On New Bermuda, Deafheaven's myriad ideas are expertly, logically organized across five tracks." The Guardian critic Lanre Bakare thought: "While claims they've got a "pop-like accessibility" feel overstated, those who like the loud bits of Mogwai and the more melodic moments of Dillinger Escape Plan will have found the metal band for them." Pitchfork's Jayson Greene stated that the album is "more overwhelming than Sunbather". Spin critic Andy O'Connor described the album as "ace metal" and stated: "In spite of Bermuda leaning less on the shoegaze that has defined Deafheaven, the album still has some of their most beautiful moments and tightest songwriting." Uncut wrote: "offers a tumultuous post metal that on passages of "Baby Blue" and "Brought To The Water," remind one more of the ethereal wandering of shoegaze."

=== Accolades ===
Accolades for New Bermuda
Publication	Accolade	Year	Rank
Pitchfork	The 50 Best Albums of 2015	2015	26
Spin	The 20 Best Metal Albums of 2015	2015	1
Stereogum	The 50 Best Albums of 2015	2015	10

== Track listing ==
No.	Title	Length
1.	"Brought to the Water"	8:37
2.	"Luna"	10:14
3.	"Baby Blue"	10:06
4.	"Come Back"	9:16
5.	"Gifts for the Earth"	8:22
Total length:		46:35

Japanese edition bonus track
No.	Title	Length
6.	"From the Kettle Onto the Coil"	6:36
Total length:		53:11

== Personnel ==
Deafheaven

- George Clarke
- Kerry McCoy
- Daniel Tracy
- Shiv Mehra
- Stephen Lee Clark

Additional personnel

- Jack Shirley – production, engineering, mixing and mastering
- Nick Steinhardt – art direction and design
- Allison Schulnik – cover art

== Charts ==
Chart performance for New Bermuda
Chart (2015)	Peak position
Belgian Albums (Ultratop Flanders)	88
German Albums (Offizielle Top 100)	51
US Billboard 200	63
US Independent Albums (Billboard)	8
US Indie Store Album Sales (Billboard)	5
US Top Hard Rock Albums (Billboard)	9
US Top Rock Albums (Billboard)	16
