= Deafheaven / Bosse-de-Nage =

- Deafheaven's side of the LP jacket.

EP (split) by Deafheaven and Bosse-de-Nage
- Released: November 20, 2012
- Recorded: August 2012
- Genre: Post-black metal; post-rock; post-hardcore
- Length: 19:38
- Label: The Flenser
- Producer: Deafheaven; Jack Shirley

Deafheaven chronology
Roads to Judah (2011)	Deafheaven / Bosse-de-Nage (2012)	Sunbather (2013)

Bosse-de-Nage chronology
III (2012)	Deafheaven / Bosse-de-Nage (2012)	All Fours (2015)

Deafheaven / Bosse-de-Nage is a split EP between the American, San Francisco Bay Area black metal bands Deafheaven and Bosse-de-Nage. The album was released in an LP format through The Flenser on November 20, 2012. Deafheaven contributed a cover of the post-rock band Mogwai's "Punk Rock" and "Cody" from their 1999 album Come On Die Young, while Bosse-de-Nage contributed the original composition, "A Mimesis of Purpose".

== Critical reception ==
Professional ratings
Review scores
Source	Rating
Decibel	(8/10)
Exclaim!	(9/10)

Mark Wilson of Exclaim stated that with the Mogwai cover, "Deafheaven continued to push boundaries and blur the lines between black metal, post-rock, shoegaze and drone." He also further wrote: "The song's slow build is relentless without ever getting stale or sacrificing the emotional release so crucial to this style of music, not to mention the dynamics are flawless, with blasting drums, huge, dense walls of sound and screeching, guttural screams that make your blood boil." Wilson also described the Bosse-de-Nage track as "a near-perfect use of dynamics and instrumentation," noting that "the band isn't afraid to branch out and make use of a variety of instruments," despite staying closer to their black metal core than Deafheaven. Brandon Stosuy of Pitchfork described the Mogwai cover as "a great fit for Deafheaven, who have a way with extended post-rock hauntings."

== Track listing ==
Side A: Deafheaven

1. "Punk Rock / Cody" (Mogwai cover) – 10:36

Side B: Bosse-de-Nage

1. "A Mimesis of Purpose" – 9:02

== Personnel ==
Additional musicians

- Astrid J. Smith – violin and string arrangements on "A Mimesis of Purpose"

Production

- Deafheaven – production on "Punk Rock / Cody"
- Jack Shirley – production, recording, mixing, mastering on "Punk Rock / Cody"
- Justin Weis – recording, mixing on "A Mimesis of Purpose"
