= Deafheaven =

American blackgaze band

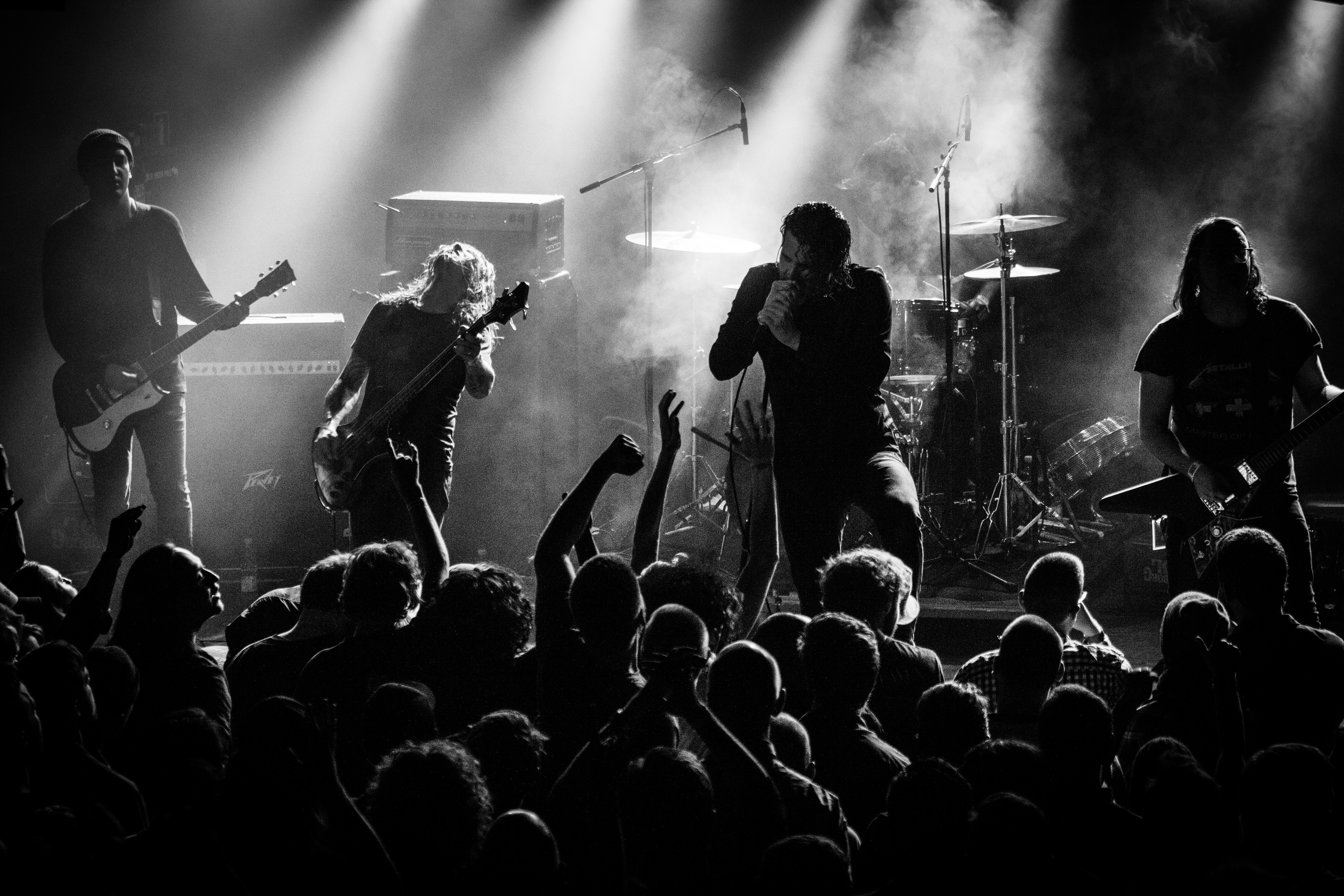
- Deafheaven in Copenhagen in 2017. From left to right: Shiv Mehra, Chris Johnson, George Clarke, and Kerry McCoy, with Daniel Tracy in the background.

Background information
- Origin: San Francisco, California, U.S.
- Genres: Blackgaze; post-metal; screamo
- Works: Discography
- Years active: 2010–present
- Labels: Deathwish; The Flenser; Anti-; Sargent House; Roadrunner
- Spinoffs: Creepers
- Members: George Clarke; Kerry McCoy; Daniel Tracy; Shiv Mehra; Chris Johnson
- Past members: Nick Bassett; Trevor Deschryver; Derek Prine; Korey Severson; Stephen Clark
- Website: deafheaven.com

Deafheaven is an American blackgaze band formed in 2010 in San Francisco. The group began as a two-piece with singer George Clarke and guitarist Kerry McCoy, who recorded and self-released a demo album. Following its release, Deafheaven recruited three new members and began to tour. Before the end of 2010, the band signed to Deathwish Inc. and released their debut album, Roads to Judah, in April 2011. They popularized a blend of black metal, shoegaze, and post-rock, among other influences, later called blackgaze by reviewers.

Deafheaven's second album, Sunbather, was released in 2013 to critical acclaim, becoming one of the best reviewed albums of the year in the US. In 2015, the band followed up with New Bermuda and in 2018 with Ordinary Corrupt Human Love. Their 2021 album, Infinite Granite, reduced the black metal elements in favor of a shoegaze sound, with mostly clean vocals from Clarke. In 2025, they released Lonely People with Power, a return to their blackgaze sound.

== History ==
=== Formation and demo (2010) ===
Deafheaven formed in February 2010 in San Francisco, California with vocalist George Clarke and guitarist Kerry McCoy, who previously performed in grindcore band Rise of Caligula together. Clarke is unsure how he arrived at the name Deafheaven, though he is aware of its appearance in William Shakespeare's Sonnet 29. The words 'deaf' and 'heaven' were combined as a homage to Slowdive.

Clarke and McCoy recorded an untitled demo album in April 2010 at Atomic Garden Studios with Jack Shirley for about US$500, which the band could not afford at the time. Because the duo did not own an electric guitar or amp at the time, the demo was written on an acoustic guitar and recorded with borrowed equipment. The untitled four-song demo, released digitally and on cassette tape in limited quantities, combined traditional black metal and post-rock. Deafheaven did not intend to release the material, but sent it out to some of their favorite blogs. After the demo was positively received, Clarke and McCoy recruited bassist Derek Prine, guitarist Nick Bassett of shoegaze band Whirr (formerly Whirl), and drummer Trevor Deschryver, who responded to an ad on Craigslist. The five-piece played their first shows in July 2010.

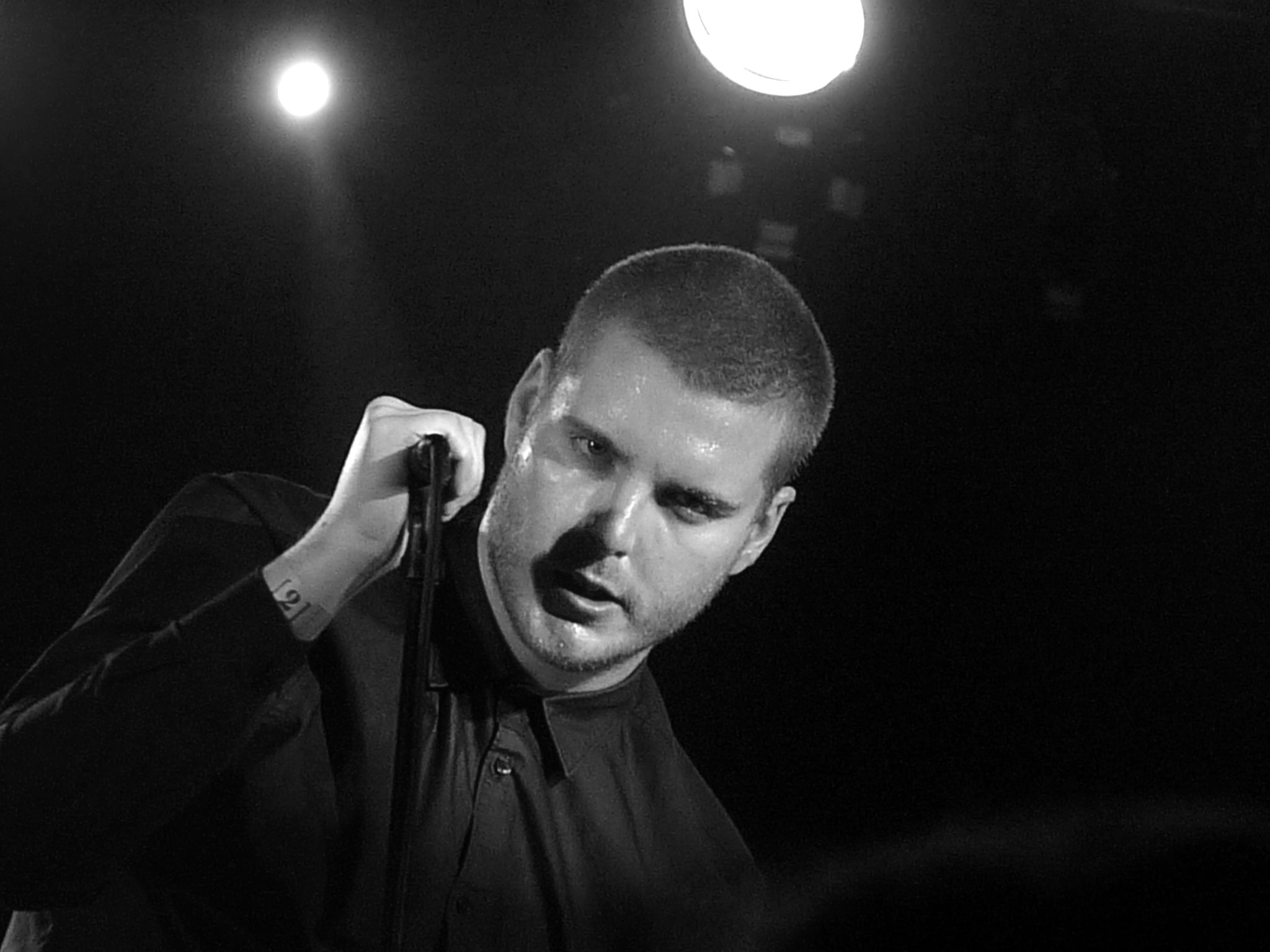
George Clarke performing in Barcelona in 2012

=== Signing to Deathwish and Roads to Judah (2010–2012) ===
Deafheaven signed to Deathwish Inc. in December 2010—a label founded by Converge's vocalist Jacob Bannon. Deathwish contacted Deafheaven to give their demo a wide physical release. By this point, the group had written some new material and asked if Deathwish could release the demo and the new material. The first Deafheaven release on Deathwish was a 7" vinyl single that featured "Libertine Dissolves" and "Daedalus", two songs taken from the group's demo. The single was pressed in a limited quantity and gifted to random people who made a purchase at Deathwish's webstore.

Their debut album, Roads to Judah, was released on April 26, 2011 through Deathwish. The title refers to the N Judah light rail that provides transportation in Deafheaven's hometown. The lyrics deal with Clarke's "year of substance abuse and debauchery." Roads to Judah received positive reviews from Decibel and RVA Magazine, and was placed on several year-end lists including NPR, Pitchfork and The A.V. Club. MSN Music named Deafheaven one of the best new artists of 2011.

To promote Roads to Judah, Deafheaven performed at Austin, Texas' SXSW festival in March 2011, toured the United States with Canadian noise rock band KEN mode in June 2011, performed at California's Sound and Fury Festival in July 2011, toured the US with post-rock band Russian Circles in November 2011, and performed a European tour in February 2012. McCoy said that Russian Circles "took us under their wing" and taught them how a band behaves. He said, "The three rules of any successful band are to write good tunes, be excellent live, and to not be an asshole while doing that. We were always striving to do that, but [Russian Circles] hammered it into our heads." Deafheaven participated in the mid-2012 festivals Northside in Brooklyn, New York and Fun Fun Fun in Austin, Texas.

As part of Deathwish Inc's free live album series, Deafheaven released Live at The Blacktop in July 2011. The album featured a live performance from January 15, 2011 in Bell Gardens, California at The Blacktop—a loading dock turned venue. In October 2012, Deafheaven released a split EP with American black metal band Bosse-de-Nage through The Flenser. Deafheaven contributed covers of the Mogwai songs "Punk Rock" and "Cody", released as a single track. The songs were from Mogwai's 1999 album Come On Die Young. Also in 2012, Deafheaven released a remastered, limited-edition vinyl record of its 2010 demo through Sargent House.

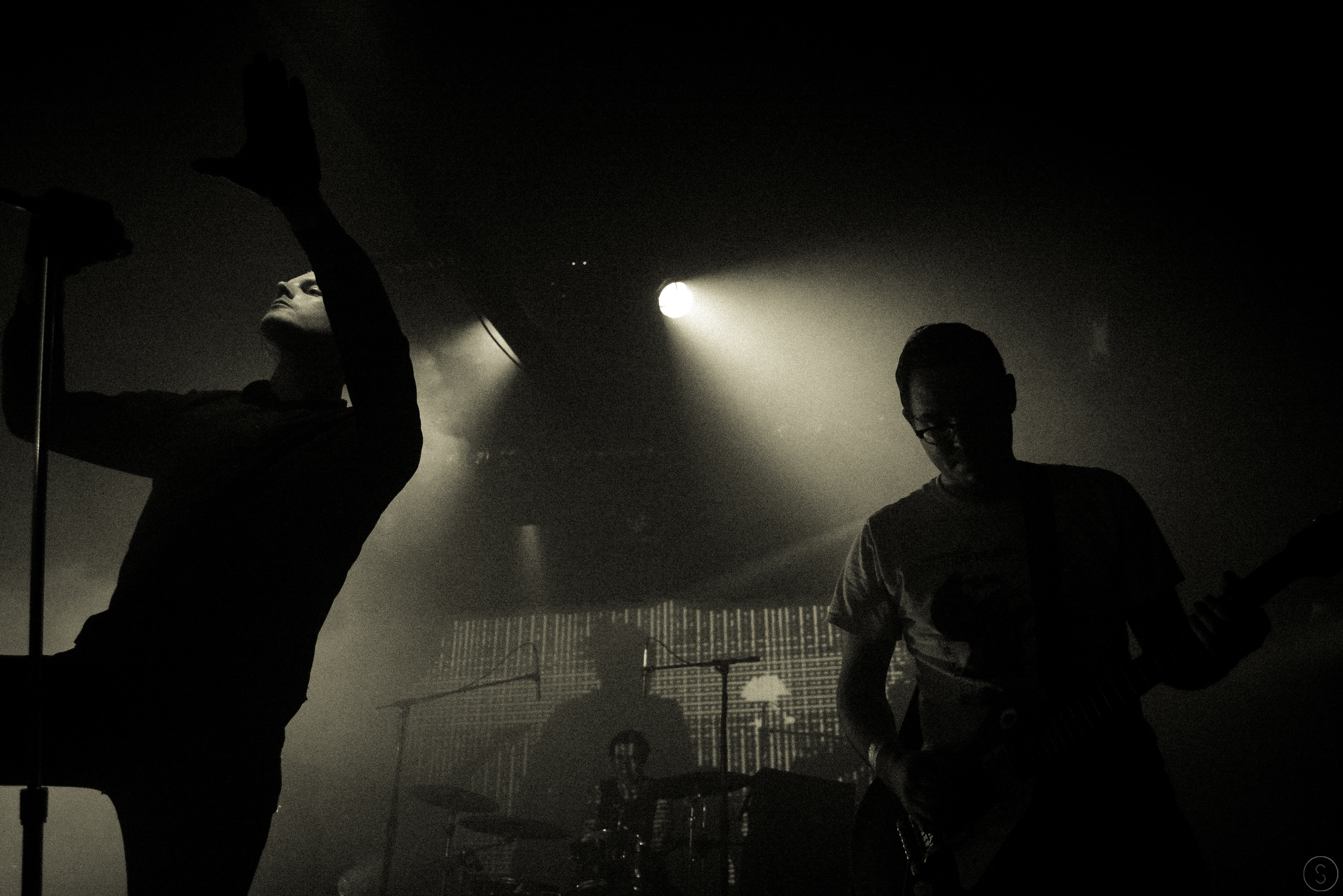
George Clarke (left), Daniel Tracy (back), and Kerry McCoy (right) performing in 2013

=== Sunbather, new lineup and critical acclaim (2013–2014) ===
In September 2011, Deafheaven announced they had begun writing music for a potential split album, EP, or full-length. At the time, McCoy described the material as "faster, darker, a lot heavier and far more experimental" than Roads to Judah. In December 2012, Clarke described their new material as less melancholic and less centered around black metal, but featuring a "lush and rock-driven, even pop-driven" sound. The album, Sunbather, was written by Clarke and McCoy—similar to how its demo was composed, but different from Roads to Judah, which was written as a five-piece. The duo were joined in the studio by drummer Daniel Tracy, who "added his own drum style to already-constructed song skeletons." The title of the album reflects Clarke's idea of perfection. He stated that it represents "A wealthy, beautiful, perfect existence that is naturally unattainable and the struggles of having to deal with that reality because of your own faults, relationship troubles, family troubles, death, et cetera." Deafheaven entered the studio to record Sunbather in January 2013 with Jack Shirley, and released the album on June 11, 2013 through Deathwish.

Sunbather was critically acclaimed upon release. Metacritic rated the album 92/100, based on 18 reviews, and declared it the best-reviewed major album of 2013. It was Deafheaven's first release to chart on Billboard, ranking at number 130 on the Billboard 200 and number 2 on the Top Heatseekers chart.

In addition to Tracy, the band recruited bassist Stephen Clark and guitarist Shiv Mehra for 2013 tours. Clarke and McCoy said previous band members left to difficulties with touring and earning little-to-no money. Deafheaven's first tour in support of Sunbather was a European/Russian tour with The Secret in April/May 2013 followed by a US tour with Marriages in June/July. In 2014, Deafheaven toured Australia in January, supported Between the Buried and Me with Intronaut and The Kindred in February/March, toured Asia and Europe in May/June, the US with Pallbearer in June, then embarked on a second European tour in August, and a North American tour with No Joy in September.

In 2013, Tracy and Mehra formed the psychedelic rock side project Creepers, with Varun Mehra and Christopher Natividad. That year, the band released a self-titled EP, and in 2014, released its debut album Lush through All Black Recording Company—founded by George Clarke and former Deafheaven member Derek Prine.

On August 25, 2014, Deafheaven released the single "From the Kettle Onto the Coil" as a part of Adult Swim's 2014 weekly singles series. Clarke described the song as following a similar formula to songs composed for Sunbather, and was not an indication of what the band's third studio album might sound like.

=== New Bermuda, Ordinary Corrupt Human Love and 10 Years Gone (2015–2020) ===
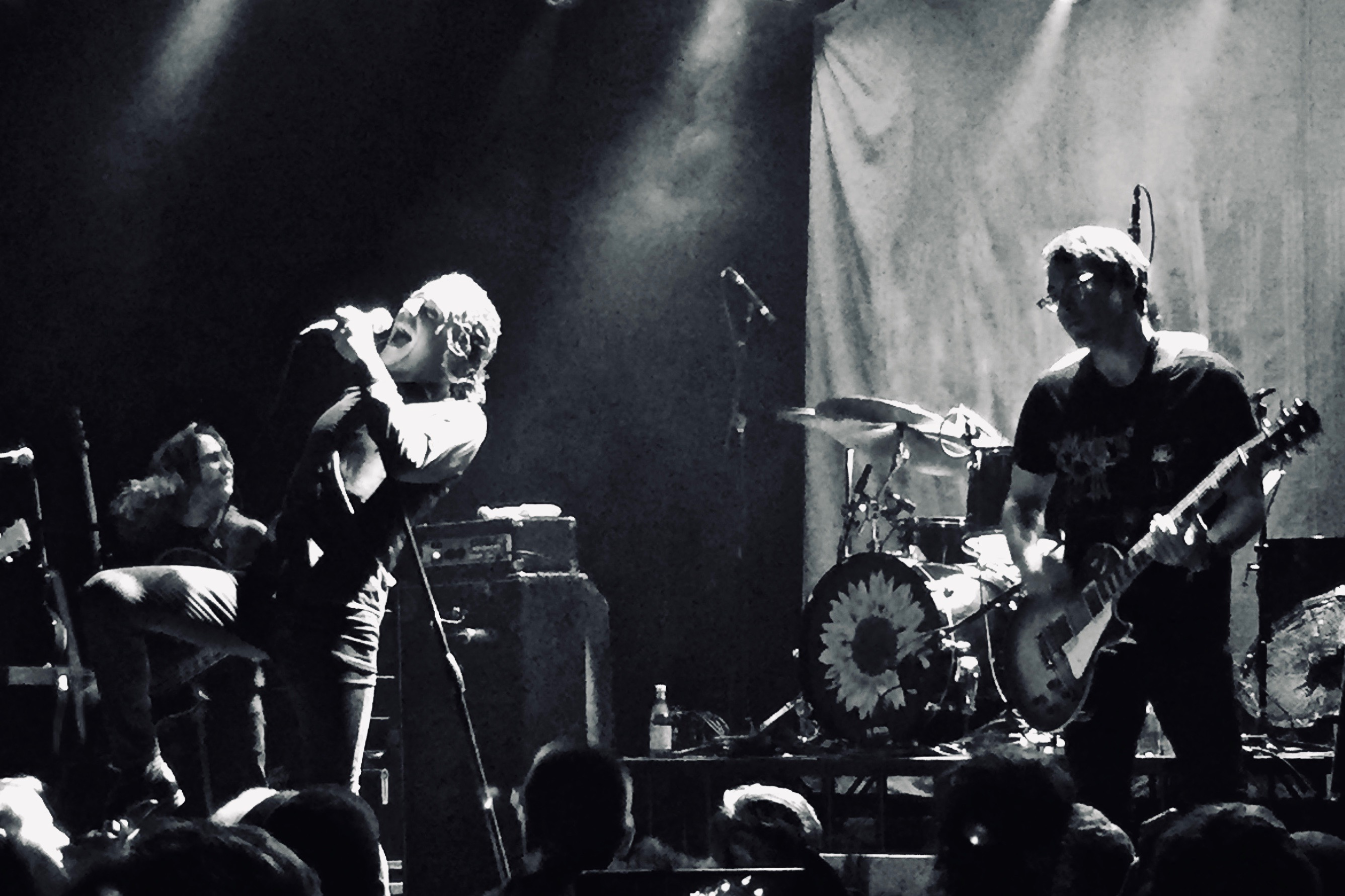
Deafheaven performing at Fete Music Hall in Providence, RI (November 2, 2018)

In July 2015, Deafheaven teased their third studio album for a possible October 2015 release through Epitaph Records' sister label Anti-, with a short video featuring new music clips, studio footage, and views of a rocky coastline. On July 28, 2015, the band announced their third studio album, New Bermuda, released on October 2, 2015, through Anti-. New Bermuda was named the 12th best album of the year in 2015 Spin magazine.

The band started working on the follow-up to New Bermuda in January 2018, when they announced they were in the studio working on a new album, scheduled for release later in the year. On April 17, 2018, the band released "Honeycomb", the lead single to their fourth studio album, Ordinary Corrupt Human Love. On June 12, 2018, a new track from the new album, titled "Canary Yellow", was released. The album was released on July 13, 2018 through Anti-. It received widespread acclaim from critics.

On December 7, it was announced that "Honeycomb" was nominated for a Grammy Award for Best Metal Performance.

The band released a B-side from their fourth album, "Black Brick", on February 27, 2019. The band released a 10-year commemorative live-in-studio record, 10 Years Gone, on December 4, 2020. The release notes of the record stated that the band was "thankful [they] were able to do this project and that fans have stuck with [them] as [they] make new music for 2021," hinting at an upcoming studio album.

=== Infinite Granite (2021–2024) ===
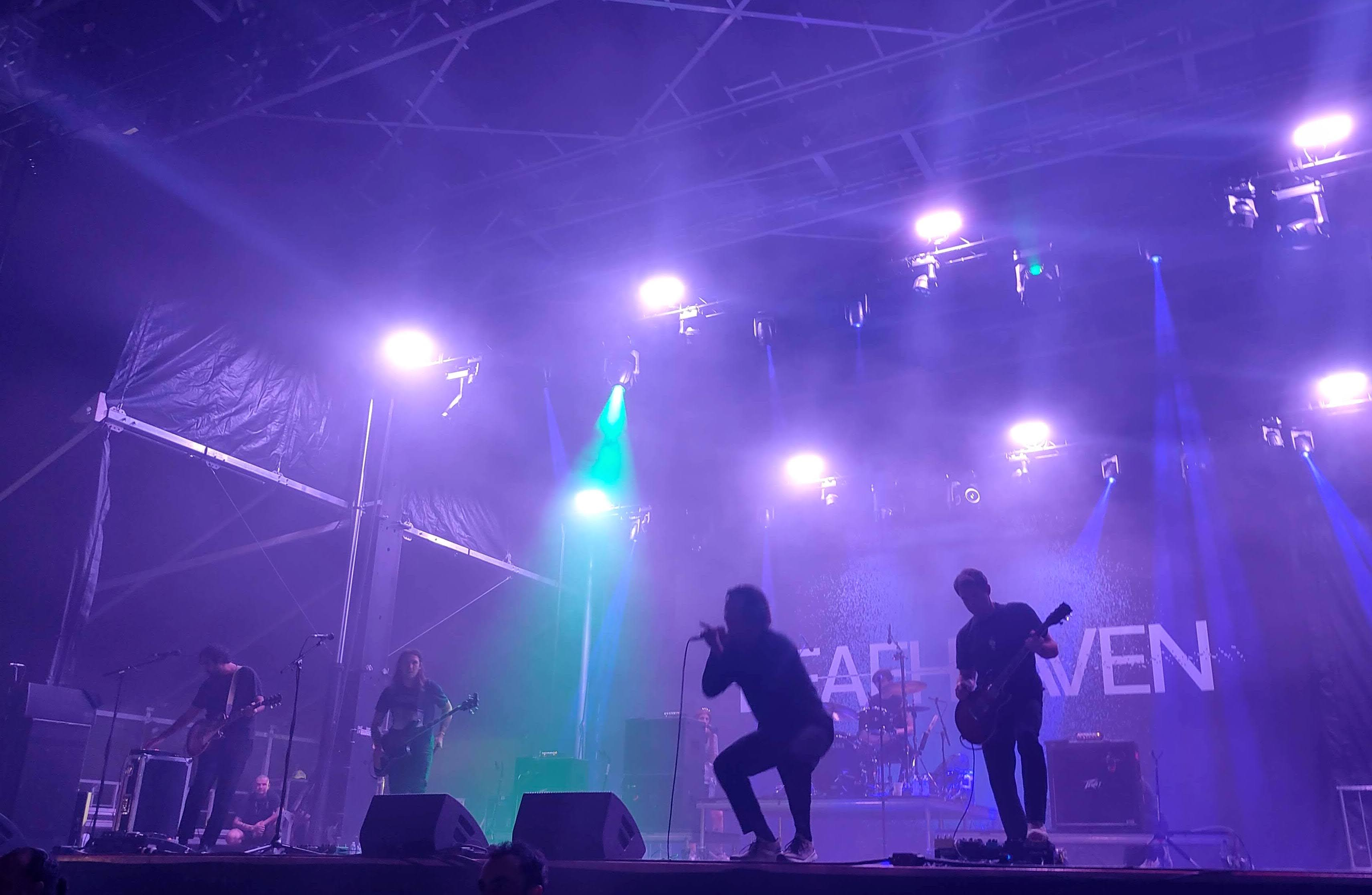
Deafheaven playing at Aftershock 2023

On June 7, 2021, the band wiped their social media pages, and posted a teaser video with the date "08.20.21" on their official website and social media outlets. Two days later, the single "Great Mass of Color" was released to streaming services. It features a shoegaze style with clean vocals, a departure from the black metal of their previous albums. It was revealed to be the lead single to the band's fifth studio album, Infinite Granite.

In April 2023, Deafheaven headlined the Roadburn Festival in the Netherlands, performing Sunbather (for its 10-year anniversary) and Infinite Granite in full on consecutive nights.

On February 7, 2024, the band posted a teaser video to announce their signing with Roadrunner Records.

=== Lonely People with Power and At Work in the Fields of the Bomb (2025–present) ===
In January 2025, Deafheaven began teasing their sixth studio album, Lonely People with Power Shortly after, the band announced the release of the single "Magnolia," accompanied by an official music video. The album was released on 28 March 2025. It reintroduced the black metal elements that were absent on Infinite Granite.

In early 2026, the band announced summer European tour dates with Show Me the Body as support.

In September of 2026, guitarist Kerry McCoy announced the band's plans to release a new EP in 2026, saying that it would be "the heaviest thing we've ever released".

The EP, titled At Work in the Fields of the Bomb, was surprise released on October 9, 2026.

== Musical style and influences ==
Deafheaven's musical style has been described by Rolling Stone as a "boundary-pushing blend of black metal, shoegaze and post-rock", later dubbed blackgaze. They have also been categorised as screamo. McCoy has cited various other influences on the band's sound, including alternative rock and early thrash metal, and said they do not consider themselves a black metal band, because, although influenced by the genre, they do not have "the ethos, the aesthetic or really the sound of one". In a 2017 interview with Red Bull Music Academy Daily, McCoy stated: "The whole shoegaze/black metal, or post-black metal thing, was being done ten years before we were a band." George Clarke cited Burzum, ColdWorld, Leviathan, Iron Maiden, Metallica, Slayer, Morbid Angel, Pantera, Weakling, Yaphet Kotto, Funeral Diner, Thursday, the Nerve Agents, AFI, the Smiths, My Bloody Valentine, the Stone Roses, the Cure and Happy Mondays as influences.

Upon the creation of blackgaze, the genre was initially panned by fans of traditional black metal and heavy metal. However with the success of Sunbather, this criticism was soon overshadowed and has since been considered as a definitive release for the genre. The album's success also gave the band much more widespread appeal, playing in several mainstream festivals where the band is usually the only metal-oriented act.

== Members ==
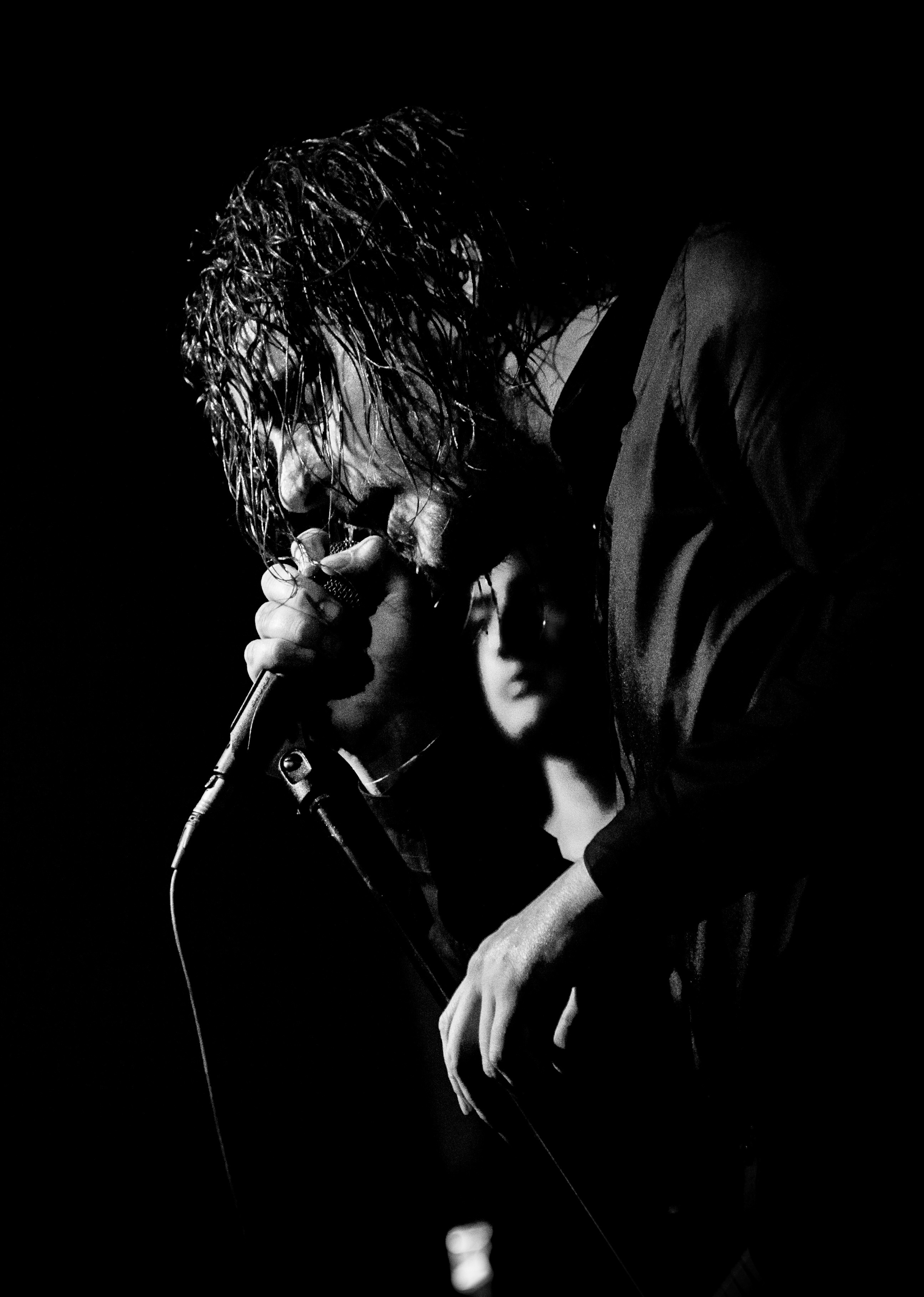
George Clarke in 2017

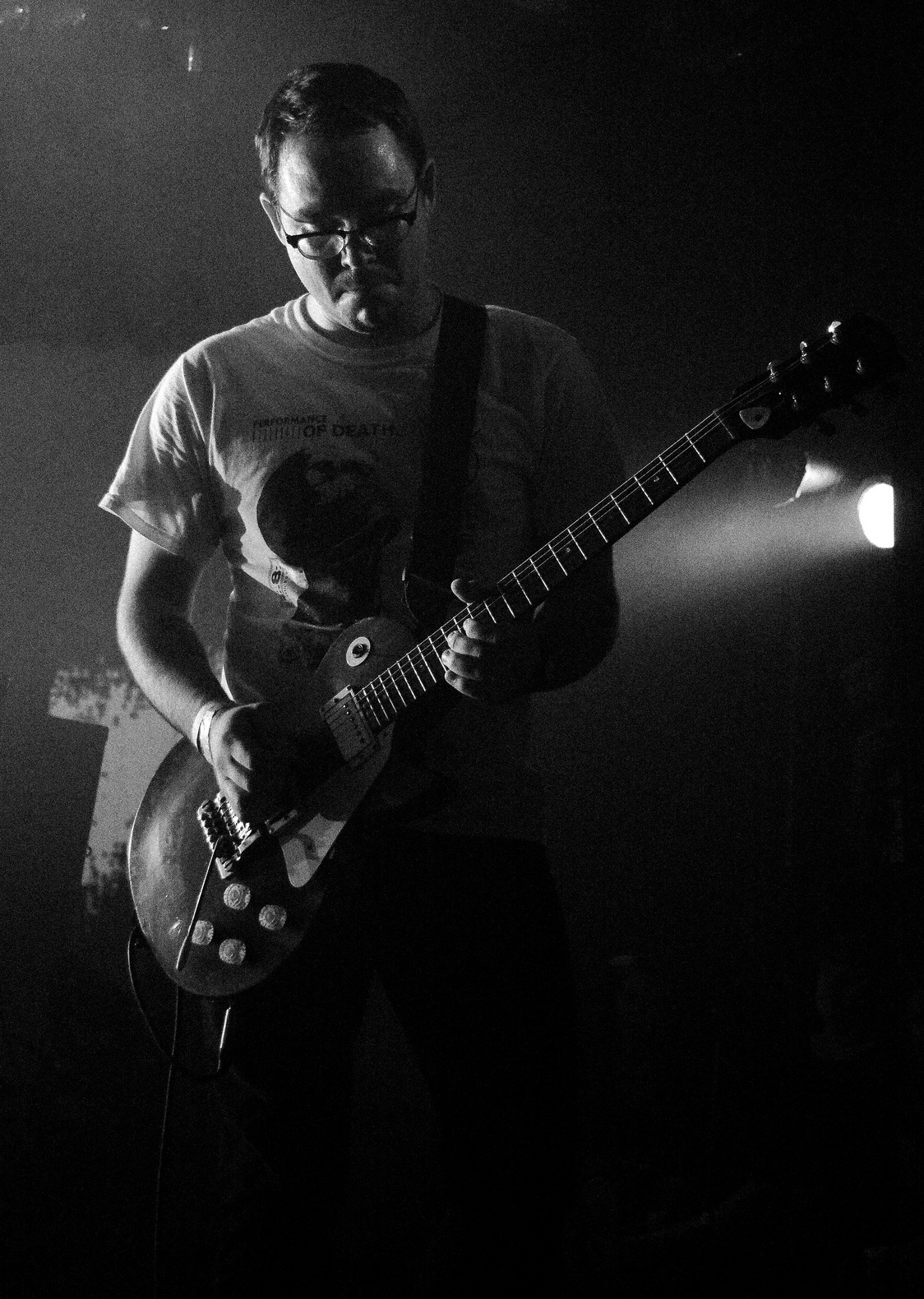
Kerry McCoy in 2013

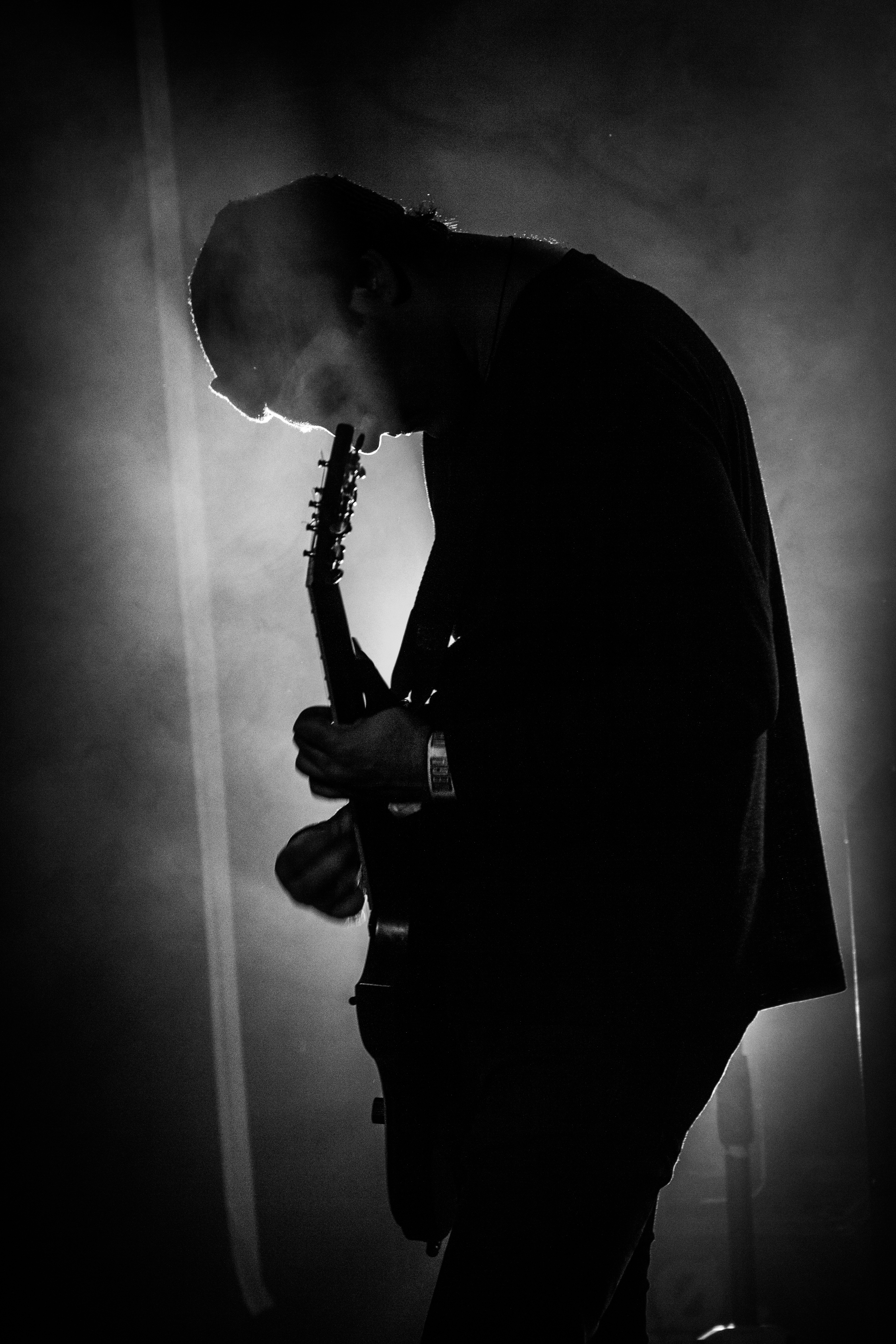
Shiv Mehra in 2017

Current members

- George Clarke – lead vocals (2010–present)
- Kerry McCoy – guitar (2010–present), bass (2010, 2012–2013)
- Daniel Tracy – drums (2012–present)
- Shiv Mehra – guitar, backing vocals, keyboards (2013–present)
- Chris Johnson – bass, backing vocals (2017–present)

Current touring musicians

- Ian Waters – guitar (2025–present; substitute for Shiv Mehra)

Former members

- Nick Bassett – guitar (2010–2012)
- Derek Prine – bass (2010–2012)
- Trevor Deschryver – drums (2010–2011)
- Korey Severson – drums (2011–2012)
- Stephen Clark – bass (2013–2017)

Former session musicians

- John Kline – drums (2010; died 2012)

Former touring musicians

- Gary Bettencourt – guitar (2011)
- Joseph Bautista – guitar (2011–2012)
- Mike Coyle – guitar (2012)
- Mike Sullivan – bass (2017)
- Shaun Durkan – guitar (2023–2024)

Timeline

== Discography ==
Studio albums

- Roads to Judah (2011)
- Sunbather (2013)
- New Bermuda (2015)
- Ordinary Corrupt Human Love (2018)
- Infinite Granite (2021)
- Lonely People with Power (2025)
