= Roads to Judah =

Studio album by Deafheaven
- Released: April 26, 2011
- Recorded: December 2010 – January 2011
- Studios: Atomic Garden Studio, East Palo Alto, California
- Genres: Blackgaze; atmospheric black metal; post-metal
- Length: 38:21
- Label: Deathwish (DW120)
- Producers: Jack Shirley, Deafheaven

Deafheaven chronology
Demo (untitled) (2010)	Roads to Judah (2011)	Deafheaven / Bosse-de-Nage (2012)

Roads to Judah is the debut studio album by the American blackgaze band Deafheaven. The album was released by Deathwish Inc. on April 26, 2011. It was recorded in four days between December 2010 and January 2011. It is Deafheaven's only studio album with guitarist Nick Bassett, who left the band in 2012 to dedicate himself fully to his shoegaze project Whirr.

== About ==
The album title is a reference to N Judah, one of the busiest lines in the San Francisco transit system. Lyrically, the album is about Clarke's substance abuse.

== Critical reception ==
Professional ratings
Review scores
Source	Rating
Decibel	8/10
Metal Storm	9.3/10
Rock Sound	6/10
RVA	Positive

Roads to Judah was met with generally positive reviews. Shane Mehling of Decibel gave the album an eight out of ten, and praised it for pushing the boundaries of black metal. He wrote that, "This band produces long, incredibly beautiful black metal that, aside from the buried shrieks of the vocalist, doesn't have a drop of evil or noticeable malice" and that Deafheaven is "sure as hell doing a lot more with the genre than the newest batch of gauntlet-wearing Darkthrone worshipers." Graham Scala of RVA Magazine wrote that Deafheaven's songs are, "all a series of graceful transitions and dynamic shifts in timbre, rather than marathon blastbeat sessions or one effects-laden crescendo after another. This is a distinction which not only separates them from the majority of their contemporaries, but has provided the basis for a memorable and compelling release." However, Alex Deller of Rock Sound gave the album a six out of ten stating that Deafheaven's blend of black metal and shoegaze was not "an entirely new proposition" and compared the album to the music of Liturgy.

=== Accolades ===
Publication	Country	Accolade	Rank
The A.V. Club	US	Loud's Top 15 of 2011	12
Decibel	US	Top 40 Extreme Albums of 2011	36
MSN	US	The Top 50 Albums of 2011	17
NPR	US	The Best Metal Albums of 2011	6
Pitchfork	US	Top 40 Metal Albums of 2011	22

== Track listing ==
All songs written and recorded by Deafheaven.

No.	Title	Length
1.	"Violet"	12:19
2.	"Language Games"	6:46
3.	"Unrequited"	9:31
4.	"Tunnel of Trees"	9:45
Total length:		38:21

== Personnel ==
Adapted from the album liner notes.

Deafheaven

- Nick Bassett – guitars
- George Clarke – vocals
- Trevor Deschryver – drums
- Kerry McCoy – guitars
- Derek Prine – bass

Production

- Jack Shirley – production, engineering, mixing, mastering
- Deafheaven – production

Artwork

- R. Sawyer – cover art, insert art
- N. Steinhardt – package design
