= Kerry McCoy (musician) =

American guitarist (born 1988)

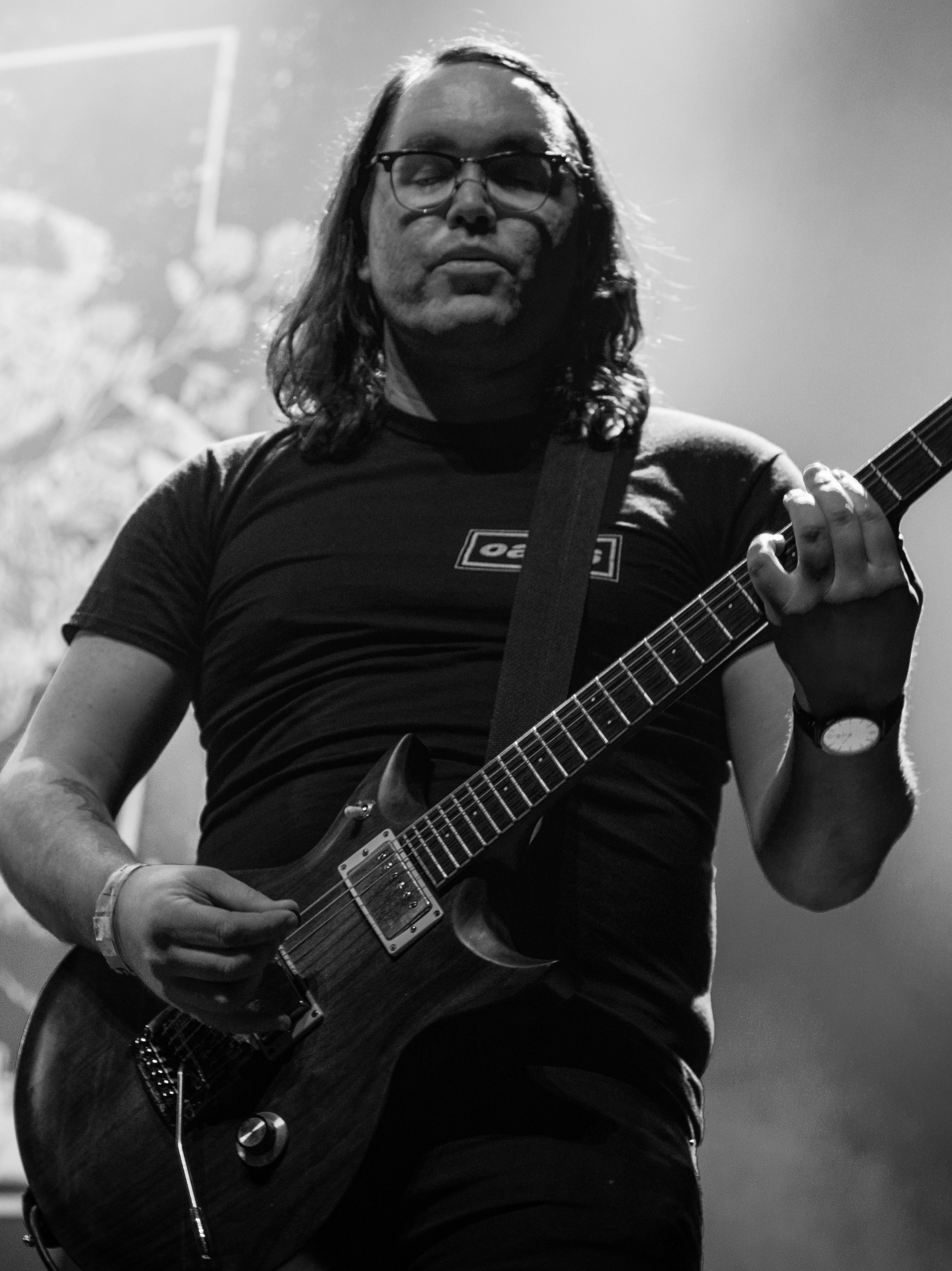
- McCoy performing with Deafheaven in 2017

Background information
- Born: Kerry Dylan McCoy; January 26, 1988 (age 38)
- Origin: Yuma, Arizona, U.S.
- Genres: Blackgaze; black metal; shoegaze; post-rock; post-metal; grindcore
- Occupations: Musician; songwriter
- Instruments: Guitar; bass
- Years active: 2006–present
- Member of: Deafheaven

Kerry Dylan McCoy (born January 26, 1988) is an American musician, best known as the guitarist of San Francisco–based blackgaze band Deafheaven.

== Biography ==
McCoy is a native of Yuma, Arizona, and lived in Port Hueneme, Oxnard, and Stockton, California, before moving to Modesto at age 10. He started playing guitar at age 11 and got his first electric guitar at age 13. Playing with various bands since he was 13, McCoy met future bandmate George Clarke in 9th grade, after he complimented Clarke's Slayer t-shirt. Clarke further introduced McCoy, who was a fan of Dead Kennedys, to extreme metal music. The two eventually shared a mutual interest in black metal.

From 2006 to 2011, McCoy and Clarke were the members of Modesto-based grindcore band Rise of Caligula. McCoy played bass with the band and Clarke was the vocalist. Following the disbandment of Rise of Caligula, Clarke and McCoy moved to San Francisco and formed Deafheaven in February 2010. The duo recorded an untitled demo album in April 2010 at Atomic Garden Studios with Jack Shirley for about US$500, which they could not afford at the time. As McCoy did not own an electric guitar or amp at the time, he wrote the demo with an acoustic guitar and recorded with equipment borrowed from the studio.

In 2010, Deafheaven became a five-piece with the addition of bassist Derek Prine, guitarist Nick Bassett and drummer Trevor Deschryver. At the same year, the band signed to Deathwish, Inc. and released their debut album Roads to Judah in 2011. Following a series of international touring and the release of a split EP with Bosse-de-Nage, Deafheaven released their sophomore album, Sunbather in 2013. The album, written solely by Clarke and McCoy, was critically acclaimed.

In 2014, McCoy was featured on the seventh episode of Guitar Power, a guitar-focused web series presented by Matt Sweeney.

In 2025, McCoy played as a touring guitarist in Thursday.

== Artistry ==
McCoy's guitar playing incorporates influences from various genres atypical of traditional black metal sound, including shoegaze, dream pop, post-rock and indie rock. According to Jonah Bayer of Vice, McCoy "takes simple melodies and raising them to stratospheric heights through his use of effects and dynamics." His guitar sound is also described as "Kevin Shields meets Immortal and manages to be bone-crushingly heavy without being overly complicated." McCoy's music also features clean melodic passages and reverse delay drone pieces.

McCoy's style was compared to those of Kevin Shields of My Bloody Valentine and Johnny Marr of The Smiths, whom he credits as influences.

McCoy is also a fan of hip hop music.

== Discography ==
With Deafheaven

- Roads to Judah (2011)
- Sunbather (2013)
- New Bermuda (2015)
- Ordinary Corrupt Human Love (2018)
- Infinite Granite (2021)
- Lonely People with Power (2025)

With Rise of Caligula

- Libretto EP (2008)
- Parading from Heaven's Descent (2009)

Other collaborations

- 25th Street Sessions (2016) (with Antwon)
