= Untitled Deafheaven demo =

Demo (untitled)
- Original 2010 artwork

Demo album by Deafheaven
- Released: June 1, 2010
- Recorded: April 2010
- Genres: Black metal, post-rock
- Length: 24:43
- Producers: Deafheaven; Jack Shirley

Deafheaven chronology
| Demo (untitled) (2010) | Roads to Judah (2011) |

Singles from Demo
- 1. "Libertine Dissolves" / "Daedalus" Released: January 2011

Alternate cover
- Remaster 2012 artwork

Professional ratings
Review scores
| Source | Rating |
|---|---|
| MetalSucks | 3.5/5 stars |

The untitled demo by American black metal band Deafheaven was self-released by the band on June 1, 2010. The EP would later be remastered and re-released in 2012 through Sargent House.

== History ==
The demo was written and recorded by Deafheaven's two founding members, George Clarke and Kerry McCoy, with John Kline performing on drums. It was initially only available in digital download formats before receiving a limited release on cassette. Clarke and McCoy distributed it to a few of the band's favorite blogs and later recruited three new band members to tour in support of the demo.

After its release, several record labels began courting Deafheaven to give the demo a proper, wide release. Deathwish Inc., co-founded by Jacob Bannon of Converge, was one of these labels that reached out to the band. Deafheaven was interested in working with Deathwish but wanted to release newer material they had been working on at the time. As a result, Deathwish released a 7" single featuring "Libertine Dissolves" and "Daedalus" in January 2011 and a full-length album with all-new material titled Roads to Judah in April 2011.

In late 2012, Sargent House released a limited-edition, remastered vinyl edition of the demo with new artwork. This version is also available on the band's Bandcamp page.

== Reception ==
The metal blog MetalSucks gave the album a rating of (3.5/5) in 2010 and stated: "While Deafheaven's music shares surface characteristics with the classic black metal sound, this demo is so distanced from Mayhem and Immortal as to be another kind of music entirely. It engulfs rather than tramples, shimmers where so much black metal rattles."

== Track listing ==
All music written and recorded by Deafheaven.

| No. | Title | Length |
|---|---|---|
| 1. | "Libertine Dissolves" | 5:13 |
| 2. | "Bedrooms" | 2:06 |
| 3. | "Daedalus" | 5:54 |
| 4. | "Exit:Denied" | 11:30 |
| Total length: | | 24:43 |

== Personnel ==
Album personnel adapted from remastered vinyl liner notes.

- Deafheaven – recording, production
- Jack Shirley – production, engineering, mastering
- Nick Steinhardt – logo design
- Karlynn Holland – logo design
