= Blackgaze =

Fusion genre of black metal and shoegaze

- Stylistic origins: Shoegaze; atmospheric black metal; post-hardcore; post-metal; screamo
- Cultural origins: Early to mid-2000s, France

Blackgaze is a fusion genre combining elements of black metal and shoegaze. The word is a blend of the names of the two genres, described by The Guardian as "the buzz term for a new school of bands taking black metal out of the shadows and melding its blast beats, dungeon wailing and razorwire guitars with the more reflective melodies of post-rock, shoegaze and post-hardcore." According to Exclaim!, blackgaze "marries the harsh, alien instrumentation of black metal with the mellower, dreamy soundscapes of shoegaze."

Influenced by atmospheric black metal bands like Ulver and Summoning, the genre was pioneered by French musician Neige around 2005 through the projects Alcest and Amesoeurs and has risen to prominence with the success of American group Deafheaven. The Guardian named Deafheaven "blackgaze's de facto poster boys, the most likely to open up black metal to an even wider audience", and Exclaim! described their second album Sunbather – the most critically acclaimed album of 2013 on Metacritic – as seminal to blackgaze.

== Development ==
Michael Nelson of Stereogum tracks the origins of blackgaze to the early work of French musician Neige, who pioneered the fusion through projects including Alcest, Amesoeurs and Lantlôs. According to Nelson, Alcest's 2005 EP Le Secret was "the birth of blackgaze"; he noted that it sounded "like a Cocteau Twins/Burzum collaborative split" and that "[r]oughly half the time, vocals were delivered in an angelic coo; the other half, they were a raw, distant shriek". Natalie Zina Walschots of Exclaim! also credits Neige with pioneering the style, while noting that American band Deafheaven has pushed the genre to "greater prominence".

== Reception ==
The genre was poorly received on the traditional black metal and heavy metal communities, to the point of being dubbed "hipster metal" due to its origin and eventual success among those outside of the metal community. Music by bands such as Wolves in the Throne Room, Oathbreaker and most prominently the release of Deafheaven's 2013 album Sunbather, inspired worldwide discussion criticizing the "gatekeeping behaviour" of some heavy metal communities.

Eventually the genre would gain widespread appeal by its presence in mainstream music festivals and the emergence of younger audiences, associating blackgaze with other variations of modern extreme music such as post-metal and Avant-garde metal.

== See also ==
- List of blackgaze artists
