= Andrew Heringer =

American singer-songwriter

- Born: November 28, 1984 (age 41); Sacramento, CA
- Origin: Placerville, CA
- Genres: Pop Rock Folk
- Occupations: Musician, singer-songwriter, producer, mixer
- Instruments: Vocals, guitar, bass, banjo, drums, keyboards
- Labels: Atlantic; Dawson Records; AWAL; Chop Shop
- Website: www.andrewheringer.com

Andrew Heringer (born November 28, 1984) is an American musician, singer-songwriter, composer, music-producer, music-mixer, theater collaborator and performer.

== Milo Greene ==
In 2009, Heringer started writing and recording music that eventually became the debut album by Milo Greene with bandmates Marlana Sheetz and Robbie Arnett. Most of the debut Milo Greene was recorded on Heringer's laptop and mobile recording gear at the homes and cabins of friends and family. The band choose to finish off recording at Bear Creek Studios in Woodinville, WA with producer Ryan Hadlock.

From 2012 to 2015 while Heringer was in the band, Milo Greene released two albums – Milo Greene and Control. Milo Greene was released on July 17, 2012, and peaked at number 1 on the US Billboard Heatseekers Albums and number 115 on the Billboard 200 albums chart.

They appeared on multiple late night television shows including Late Night With David Letterman, The Tonight Show with Jay Leno and two appearances on Conan. On the touring front, they opened for The Civil Wars, Foster The People, Bombay Bicycle Club, Cold War Kids, Stars (Canadian band), and The Walkmen, and toured with Lucius, Bahamas, Kopecky and Family of the Year. Their music has been featured in TV shows such as Grey's Anatomy, Supernatural, Hart of Dixie, and Nikita as well as in the films Big Eyes and Fun Size.

In 2013, Heringer collaborated with Damien Rice and provided backing vocals for Damien's album My Favourite Faded Fantasy as well as for songs for the soundtrack of The Prophet.

On December 17, 2015, Heringer announced on his social media that he would be parting ways with Milo Greene to pursue his own projects as well as write, produce and mix with other artists.

== The Guest and The Host ==
The Guest and The Host is Heringer's solo indie folk project recorded primarily at his Beachwood Canyon cabin he calls Mirror Wall Studio. Buzzbands.LA wrote "Heringer’s work as the Guest and the Host finds its heartbeat in the ’70s-style folk-rock of his former band’s [ Milo Greene ] first album."

In February 2018, Heringer released his first E.P. under The Guest and The Host called "You're Exactly Where You're Supposed to Be" – a collection of 6 songs; many of which had been previously released as singles.

A number of The Guest and the Host songs have been featured in television shows such as "Looking Out For You" iZombie (TV series), "Love and Laughter" on Kevin (Probably) Saves the World, "Best Friend" on Whiskey Cavalier and "You Bring Me Joy" on Jane The Virgin.

== Dawson records ==
Heringer has started to release music under his own label, Dawson Records, for his project The Guest and the Host as well as his collaborations with Madi Sipes and The Painted Blue and other artists he works with out of his studio.

== George Harrison Tribute album ==
On February 25, 2020, Heringer released "Let Me Into Your Heart : A Tribute To George Harrison." The album consisted of 17 tracks written or recorded by Harrison from his solo albums as well as his time with The Beatles and The Traveling Wilburys. The album was released on what would have been Harrison's 77th birthday. The album featured performances by many of Heringer's frequent collaborators – Madi Diaz, Geographer (Band), Paul McDonald (musician), Cary Brothers, Avid Dancer, Zach of Rogue Wave (band) and Clara-Nova.

== Discography ==
Year	Band	Release	Role	Type
2012	Milo Greene	Milo Greene	Band Member, Mixing, Engineering	Album
2014	Damien Rice	My Favourite Faded Fantasy	Backing Vocals	Album
2014	Damien Rice	The Prophet	Backing Vocals	Album
2014	Field Division	Reverie State	Backing Vocals	Album
2015	Milo Greene	Control	Band Member, Engineering	Album
2015	Kitfox	To Keep You Company	Mixing	Album
2016	morgxn	notorious	Producer	Single
2016	Avid Dancer	Be With You	Producer / Co-writer	Single
2016	Valley Shine	Home	Producer / Co-writer	Single
2016	Crywolf	Windswept	Additional Production & Electric Guitars	Single
2016	Milo Greene	We Kept The Lights On	Co-writer	Single
2017	morgxn	hard pill to swallow	Producer / Co-writer	Single
2017	Crywolf	Weight	Co-producer	Single
2017	Caroline Pennell	Lovesick (Featuring The Guest and The Host)[Acoustic]	Producer / Mixing / Featured Artist	Single
2017	Madi Diaz	The One That You Want	Producer / Mixing / Co-writer	Single
2017	The Guest and The Host	Wish You Were Here (Pink Floyd Cover)	Artist / Producer / Mixing	Single
2017	Proper Gentlemen feat Mr Gabriel	Stronger	Artist / Co-producer / Co-writer	Single
2017	Sharaya Summers	In The Light of The Moon	Co-writer	Single
2017	Madi Sipes & The Painted Blue	Sex & Sadness	Producer / Mixing / Co-writer	EP
2017	Luke Wade	Fight For You	Producer / Mixing / Co-writer	Single
2017	Madi Diaz	Okay To Be Alone	Producer / Mixing / Co-writer / Featured Artist	EP
2017	Colyer	Enough	Producer / Mixing / Co-writer	Single
2017	Proper Gentlemen feat Mr Gabriel	Own The Night	Artist / Co-producer / Co-writer	Single
2017	The Guest and The Host Feat. Timothy	Love and Laughter	Artist / Producer / Mixing / Co-writer	Single
2017	Jens Kuross	Spiraling	Producer / Co-writer	Single
2017	Congratulationz	Keep Breathing (Ingrid Michaelson Cover)	Artist / Producer / Mixing	Single
2017	Congratulationz	They (Jem (singer) Cover)	Artist / Producer / Mixing	Single
2018	CLMD feat. The Guest and The Host	Wide Awake	Featured Artist / Songwriter	Single
2018	The Guest and The Host	You're Exactly Where You're Supposed To Be	Artist / Producer / Mixing / Co-writer	Album
2018	Madi Sipes and The Painted Blue	Privacy	Producer / Mixing / Co-writer	Album
2018	Cammora feat. The Guest and The Host	Best Friends	Featured Artist / Co-writer	Single
2018	Jon Bryant	At Home	Co-writer	Single
2018	Avid Dancer	Sharaya	Producer / Mixing / Co-writer	Album
2018	Claire Guerreso	No Doubt	Co-writer/ Additional Production	Single
2018	Geographer (Band)	Get There Soon	Producer / Mixing / Co-writer	Single
2018	Adam Jones	Disco Ballet	Producer / Mixing / Co-writer	Album
2018	Chase McBride	Pink Lemonade	Producer / Mixing / Co-writer	Album
2018	Sound Bath	Meridian Healing Sounds: Meditation Tones	Artist/Producer	Album
2018	Still Parade	Portals	Co-writer	Single
2018	Mr. Whiskers	Whiskers Sings Christmas	Producer, Cat Wrangler	Album
2018	Luke Wade	Give It All To You	Producer / Co-Writer	Single
2019	Vision Vision Feat. Congratulationz	Hard Times	Vocalist / Co-Writer	Single
2019	The Guest and The Host x K.S. Rhoads	Not in This Together	Artist / Co-Producer / Mixing / Co-writer	Single
2019	The Guest and The Host	You Bring Me Joy	Artist / Producer / Mixing / Co-writer	Single
2019	Avid Dancer	Feels	Co-Producer / Co-writer / Mixing / Mastering	Single
2019	Jmsey	Landslide	Co-Producer / Mixing / Mastering	Single
2019	Bailen (band)	Going on a Feeling	Co-writer	Single
2019	Jon Bryant	Out of the Blue	Co-writer	on the album Cult Classic
2019	Ghost & The City	The Addict	Vocal Production / Co-writer	Single
2019	Enjune	Teal Dreams	Production / Mixing / Mastering	EP
2019	Geographer (Band), Clara-Nova, The Guest & The Host	Just Wanna Dance	Producer / Mixing / Co-writer / Artist	Single
2019	Rivvrs	My Enemy	Producer / Mixing / Co-writer / Mastering	Single
2019	Jmsey feat. Hobo Johnson	Moments	Additional Production / Mixing / Mastering	EP
2019	Madi Sipes & The Painted Blue	Do You Think About Me?	Production / Co-writer / Mixing / Mastering	EP
2019	talker	Learning The Feeling & Keep Me Safe	Production / Co-writer / Mixing	Singles
2019	The Guest and the Host	Half Moon Bay	Artist / Production / Co-writer / Mixing / Mastering	Single
2019	Ghost & The City	Crave It	Vocal Production / Co-writer	Single
2019	Congratulationz feat. Cary Brothers	Superstar	Artist / Production / Co-writer / Mixing / Mastering	Single
2020	Congratulationz feat. Fire Choir	Wild Woman #Boss	Artist / Production / Co-writer / Mixing / Mastering	Single
2020	Madi Sipes & The Painted Blue	Listen	Production / Co-writer / Mixing / Mastering	Single
2020	Silver Torches	Love Someone	Co-writer	Single
2020	The Guest and The Host Presents	Let Me into Your Heart : A Tribute To George Harrison	Artist / Production / Mixing / Mastering	Album
2020	David Taylor Gomes, Concept Album Cast	Ranked, A Musical Concept Album	Production / Mixing / Mastering	Album
2020	Madi Sipes & The Painted Blue	8;00	Production / Co-writer / Mixing / Mastering	EP
2020	EllaHarp	Better and Bittersweet	Production / Mixing / Mastering	Single
2020	DonCat	Sunrise	Production / Co-writer / Mixing / Mastering	EP
2020	Joshua Radin	Lean On Me	Production / Mixing / Mastering	Single
2020	The Guest and The Host	Waking Up To You	Artist / Production / Co-writer / Mixing / Mastering	Single
2020	David Taylor Gomes	When It Rains It Pours	Production / Mixing / Mastering	Single
2020	Jon Bryant	I Don't Know How	Songwriter	Single
2020	Madi Sipes and The Painted Blue	Do You Think About Me (Congratulationz Remix)	Remixer	Single
2020	Jens Kuross	Unglued	Production / Co-writer	Single
2020	Sharaya Summers	When It's Time	Production / Co-writer / Mixing	Single
2020	RIVVRS	The Damage is Done	Co-writer	Single
2020	Morgxn x Sound Bath	WONDER [reimagined]	Remix	Single
2020	Madi Sipes & The Painted Blue	Somebody's Daughter	Production, Mixing, Mastering	Single
2020	Lo Hum	Escape	Co-writer	Single
2020	Mr. Whiskers	Happy Birthday (Party Edition)	Production	Single
2020	Congratulationz feat. Tiny Deaths	Prisoner	Production / Co-writer / Mixing / Mastering	Single
2021	Joshua Radin	Better Life	Co-writer	Single
2021	Madi Sipes & The Painted Blue	Heaven	Production, Mixing, Mastering	Single
2021	The Guest and The Host	Never Be The Same Without You	Artist / Production / Co-writer / Mixing / Mastering	Single
2021	Soll	Beautiful Life	Production	Single
2021	Clans, Mr Daytona, Super Coupe	Super Coupe	Mixing / Mastering	EP
2021	Destiny Molina	ONLYWYOU	Co-Production / Mixing / Mastering	Single
2021	RIVVRS	Damage Is Done, Too Long, Start Living	Co – Writer	Various Singles
2021	The Guest and The Host	Great Big World of Lies	Artist / Production / Co-writer / Mixing / Mastering	Single
2021	Nature Sound Bath	Mist	Artist	EP

=== Television and Movie Placements ===
- Grey's Anatomy
  - Milo Greene · "1957" (S9 · E7 · I Was Made For Lovin' You · 29 Nov 2012)
  - Milo Greene · "Don't You Give Up On Me" (S8 · E22 · Let the Bad Times Roll · 3 May 2012)
  - Madi Diaz · "The One That You Want" (S13 · E22 · Leave It Inside · 4 May 2017)
  - Congratulationz · "Keep Breathing" (S14 · E7 · Who Lives, Who Dies, Who Tells Your Story · 9 Nov 2017)
  - Congratulationz feat. CanvasBeta · "They" (S14 · E7 · Who Lives, Who Dies, Who Tells Your Story · 9 Nov 2017)
- 13 Reasons Why
  - Jens Kuross · "Spiraling" (Official Trailer – Final Season)
- Jane The Virgin
  - The Guest and the Host · "You Bring Me Joy" ("S5 · E4 · Chapter Eighty-Five · 17 Apr 2019")
- Lucifer
  - Jens Kuross · "Spiraling" (S3 · E4 · What Would Lucifer Do? · 23 Oct 2017)
  - Congratulationz feat. Valerie Broussard "Devil In Your Eyes" (S3 · E5 · Welcome Back, Charlotte Richards · 30 Oct 2017)
- Shameless
  - Congratulationz · "Whatever We Like" (S9 E5 · Black Haired Ginger · 7 Oct 2018)
  - Congratulationz · "Wild Woman #Boss " (S10 E11 · Location, Location, Location · 19 Jan 2020)
- Big Eyes
  - Milo Greene · "Perfectly Aligned" (Theatrical Trailer)
- iZombie
  - Milo Greene · "Royal Blue" (S1 · E10 · Mr. Berserk · 19 May 2015)
  - The Guest and The Host · "Looking Out For You" (S3 · E8 · Eat a Knievel · 23 May 2017)
  - Madi Sipes & The Painted Blue · "Blue Jean Baby" (S3 · E12 · Looking for Mr. Goodbrain (1) · 20 Jun 2017)
  - Congratulationz · "Why Can't We Be Friends" (S4 · E4 · Brainless in Seattle (2) · 19 Mar 2018)
- Hart of Dixie
  - Milo Greene · "Silent Way" (S2 · E1 · I Fall To Pieces · 2 Oct 2012)
  - Milo Greene · "Take A Step" (S2 · E6 · I Walk The Line · 13 Nov 2012)
  - Milo Greene · "What's The Matter" (S2 · E8 · Achy Breaky Hearts · 27 Nov 2012)
- Suburgatory
  - Milo Greene · "1957" (S1 · E22 · The Motherload · 16 May 2012)
  - Milo Greene · "Cutty Love" (S2 · E3 · Ryan's Song · 31 Oct 2012)
- Fun Size
  - Milo Greene · "Autumn Tree"
- Atypical
  - Milo Greene · "Cutty Love" (S1 · E1 · Antarctica · 11 Aug 2017)
- Covert Affairs
  - Milo Greene · "Cutty Love" (S3 · E9 · Suffragette City · 11 Sep 2012)
- Reign
  - Milo Greene · "Don't You Give Up On Me" (S1 · E5 · A Chill in the Air · 14 Nov 2013)
- Nikita
  - Milo Greene · "Perfectly Aligned" (S3 · E1 · 3.0 · 19 Oct 2012)
- Arrow
  - Milo Greene · "Son My Son" (S2 · E12 · Tremors · 29 Jan 2014)
- Kevin (Probably) Saves the World
  - The Guest and the Host · "Love and Laughter" (S1 · E3 · Sweet Little Lies 17 Oct 2017)
- Good Trouble
  - Rivvrs · "My Enemy" (S2 · E8 · Disruptions · 6 Aug 2019)
  - Congratulationz · "My Enemy" (S2 · E15 · 12 Feb 2020)
- Elementary
  - Chase McBride · "Find A Home" (S7 · E7 · From Russia with Drugs · 4 Jul 2019)
- Siren
  - Colyer · "Enough" (S2 · E10 · All In · 20 Jun 2019)
- Lethal Weapon
  - youthxx feat. Congratulationz · "Outlaw" (S2 · E17 · The Odd Couple · 6 Mar 2018)
- Supernatural
  - Milo Greene · "What's The Matter" (S8 · E4 · Bitten · 24 Oct 2012)
- Mary Kills People
  - Jens Kuross · "Spiraling" (S3 · E5 · Wolf, Meet Henhouse · 9 Jun 2019)
- The Blacklist
  - Vision Vision feat. Congratulationz · "Hard Times" (S6 · E2 · The Corsican · 4 Jan 2019)
- The Resident
  - Jafar · "Mood Of Water" (S2 · E18 · Emergency Contact · 25 Mar 2019)
- Catfish
  - Jafar · "Mood Of Water" (S8 · E3 · 21 Jan 2020)
- Whiskey Cavalier
  - The Guest and the Host · "Best Friend" (S1 · E5 · The English Job · 27 Mar 2019)
- Grand Hotel
  - morgxn · "Hard Pill To Swallow" (S1 · E8 · Long Night's Journey into Day" · 5 Aug 2019)
- Dynasty
  - morgxn · "Notorious" (S1 · E2 · Spit It Out · 18 Oct 2017)
- Notorious
  - morgxn · "Notorious" (S1 · E1 · Pilot · 22 Sep 2016)
- The Red Line
  - Jon Bryant · "At Home" (S1 · E4 · We Need Glory for a While · 5 May 2019)
- NCIS
  - Jon Bryant · "At Home" (S15 · E21 · One Step Forward · 1 May 2018)
- Shades of Blue
  - Claire Guerreso · "No Doubt" (S3 · E2 · The Hollow Crown · 24 Jun 2018 Promo)
- Shadowhunters: The Mortal Instruments
  - Proper Gentlemen feat. Mr Gabriel · "Stronger" (S2 · E17 · A Dark Reflection · 24 Jul 2017)
