= Who Loves the Sun =

Who Loves the Sun may refer to:

- Who Loves the Sun (2006 film), a comedy-drama film directed by Matt Bissonnette
- Who Loves the Sun (2024 film), a short documentary film directed by Arshia Shakiba
- "Who Loves the Sun", a song by the Velvet Underground from the 1970 album Loaded
- Who Loves the Sun, a 2026 album by Chat Pile
