= Who Loves the Sun (album) =

Studio album by Chat Pile
- Released: September 4, 2026
- Genres: Noise rock; sludge metal
- Length: 43:35
- Label: The Flenser
- Producer: Chat Pile

Chat Pile chronology
In the Earth Again (2025)	Who Loves the Sun (2026)

Singles from Who Loves the Sun
- 1. "Deep Blue" Released: June 9, 2026; 2. "Pen I S Mall" Released: July 7, 2026; 3. "Same Rules" Released: August 11, 2026

Who Loves the Sun is the third studio album by American rock band Chat Pile. It was released on September 4, 2026, through The Flenser. The album follows the band's second studio album, Cool World (2024) and their collaborative album with Hayden Pedigo, In the Earth Again (2025).

The album was received to critical acclaim and debuted at number 37 in the Flanders region of Belgium.

== Background ==
About the themes of the band's albums, singer Raygun Busch explained: "God's Country is definitely an Americana-type thing, whereas Cool World was informed by seeing little kids get their heads exploded in Gaza every day, and In the Earth Again is sort of a concept album about nuclear war, which is one of my great fears. On this one, so many of the songs ended up being about social media and our phones, the digital leash – not my term, but I love that term. There's so much shit happening right now beyond just war."

The song "Pen I S Mall" was written about Busch's multi-year stint working at the Penn Square Mall in Oklahoma City; its title comes from a vandalized sign for the mall that Busch made.

== Critical reception ==
Professional ratings
Aggregate scores
Source	Rating
AnyDecentMusic?	8.1/10
Metacritic	82/100
Review scores
Source	Rating
Clash	9/10
Exclaim!	9/10
The Guardian	3/5 stars
Kerrang!	4/5
Pitchfork	7.6/10

Any Decent Music gave the album a weighted average score of 8.1 out of 10 from fourteen critic scores. According to Metacritic, it received "universal acclaim" based on a weighted average score of 82 out of 100 from thirteen critic scores.

Tom Morgan of Clash called it "a layered portrait of a world sleepwalking into disaster that is somehow gripping and even fun, in a mosh-the-pain-away manner". Kyle Kohner of Exclaim! wrote that the band "sound even more unhinged, as if the years have only confirmed every fear, grievance and nightmare they first screamed into existence on God's Country", while Grant Sharples of Paste said "Chat Pile reminds you that we're all just bugs under the proverbial boot, ready to be squashed at a moment's notice." John Amen of The Line of Best Fit commented, "[Who Loves the Sun is] inarguably a bleak statement. The band’s virtuosic instrumentation and Busch’s enthralling vocals, however, make for an ironically life-affirming manifesto". He concluded, "Leave it to Chat Pile to turn a compendium of horrors into something exquisite".

Furthermore, Eli Enis of Pitchfork wrote that "the favorability toward Chat Pile's alt-rock touchstones, as opposed to their metal ones, injects the album with enough dynamic variation that it doesn't feel like a straight rehash." Alastair Shuttleworth of The Guardian was less positive, stating that "the overall direction, a straightforward softening of their early ugliness, disappoints."

== Track listing ==
All tracks are written by Aaron Tackett, Austin Tackett, Griffin Sansone, and Randy Heyer.

Who Loves the Sun track listing
No.	Title	Length
1.	"Creature"	4:23
2.	"Deep Blue"	4:05
3.	"Same Rules"	3:47
4.	"Pen I S Mall"	4:58
5.	"Shrine"	4:37
6.	"Intruder"	5:05
7.	"Christabel '26"	3:56
8.	"Influence"	4:29
9.	"Family Funeral"	5:02
10.	"October All the Time"	3:23
Total length:		43:35

"Pen I S Mall" is stylized in all caps.

== Personnel ==
These credits have been adapted from Tidal.

- Aaron Tackett – drum kit
- Austin Tackett – electric bass guitar
- Griffin Sansone – electric guitar
- Randy Heyer – lead vocals
- Morgan Brown – additional mixing
- Ben Greenberg – mixing and mastering
- Brittany Sawtelle – background vocals ("Intruder" and "Influence")
- Claire Hannah – background vocals ("Intruder" and "Influence")

== Charts ==
Chart performance for Who Loves the Sun
Chart (2026)	Peak position
Belgian Albums (Ultratop Flanders)	37
French Physical Albums (SNEP)	167
French Rock & Metal Albums (SNEP)	55
Scottish Albums (Official Charts)	41
UK Albums Sales (Official Charts)	44
UK Independent Albums (Official Charts)	17
UK Rock & Metal Albums (Official Charts)	6
US Independent Albums (Billboard)	45
US Top Album Sales (Billboard)	15
