= In the Earth Again =

Studio album by Chat Pile and Hayden Pedigo
- Released: October 31, 2025
- Genres: Post-rock; noise rock; Americana; slowcore
- Length: 36:12
- Language: English
- Labels: Computer Students; The Flenser

Hayden Pedigo chronology
I'll Be Waving as You Drive Away (2025)	In the Earth Again (2025)

Chat Pile chronology
Cool World (2024)	In the Earth Again (2025)	Who Loves the Sun (2026)

Singles from In the Earth Again
- 1. "Radioactive Dreams" Released: August 27, 2025; 2. "Demon Time" Released: September 23, 2025

In the Earth Again is a collaborative studio album between the rock band Chat Pile and musician Hayden Pedigo. It was released on October 31, 2025, by the labels Computer Students and The Flenser to universal acclaim from critics.

== Background and recording ==
During the summer of 2024, Hayden Pedigo and his wife moved from Amarillo to Oklahoma City where Chat Pile were based. Pedigo, looking to make some new friends in the area, contacted Chat Pile via Instagram, and Stin, the band's pseudonymous bassist, invited him to watch a local band's show. Following the meetup, Pedigo began spending time at Stin's house, which was a block away from his, meaning that Pedigo could arrive for collaboration "on a minute’s notice," according to Stin in an interview with Paste. In December of that year, Pedigo and Chat Pile gathered in Stin's house and began planning a collaborative studio album which would eventually become In the Earth Again.

== Critical reception ==
Professional ratings
Aggregate scores
Source	Rating
Metacritic	82/100
Review scores
Source	Rating
Beats Per Minute	83%
Exclaim!	8/10
Paste	7.3/10
Pitchfork	7.5/10

According to the review aggregator Metacritic, In the Earth Again received "universal acclaim" based on a weighted average score of 82 out of 100 from 6 critic scores.

== Track listing ==
All music is composed by Hayden Pedigo, Raygun Busch, Luther Manhole, Stin, and Captain Ron.

In the Earth Again track listing
No.	Title	Length
1.	"Outside"	1:45
2.	"Demon Time"	3:07
3.	"Never Say Die!"	3:56
4.	"Behold a Pale Horse"	3:48
5.	"The Magic of the World"	3:27
6.	"Fission/Fusion"	1:57
7.	"The Matador"	7:39
8.	"I Got My Own Blunt to Smoke"	2:51
9.	"Radioactive Dreams"	2:55
10.	"Inside"	1:52
11.	"A Tear for Lucas"	2:55
Total length:		35:12

== Personnel ==
Adapted from Allmusic.

Chat Pile and Hayden Pedigo

- Raygun Busch – Vocals, Guitar, Field Recording, Engineering, Mixing
- Luther Manhole – Guitar, Glockenspiel, Engineering, Mixing
- Stin – Bass, Field Recording, Guitar, Loops, Percussion, Synthesizer, Engineering, Mixing
- Cap'n Ron – Drums, Guitar, Mellotron, Percussion, Engineering, Mixing
- Hayden Pedigo – Guitar, Engineering, Mixing

Additional contributors

- Magnus Lindberg – Mastering
- Malcolm Byers – Cover Painting
- Tom Toye – Inside Photo
