= UMHS =

UMHS may refer to:

- Union Mine High School, El Dorado, California, United States
- University of Medicine and Health Sciences, a for-profit medical school in Basseterre, Saint Christopher Island
- University of Michigan Health System, the academic medical center of the University of Michigan in Ann Arbor, Michigan, United States
- Upper Moreland High School, Willow Grove, Pennsylvania, United States
- Upper Merion Area High School, King of Prussia, Pennsylvania, United States
