= The Republic Tigers =

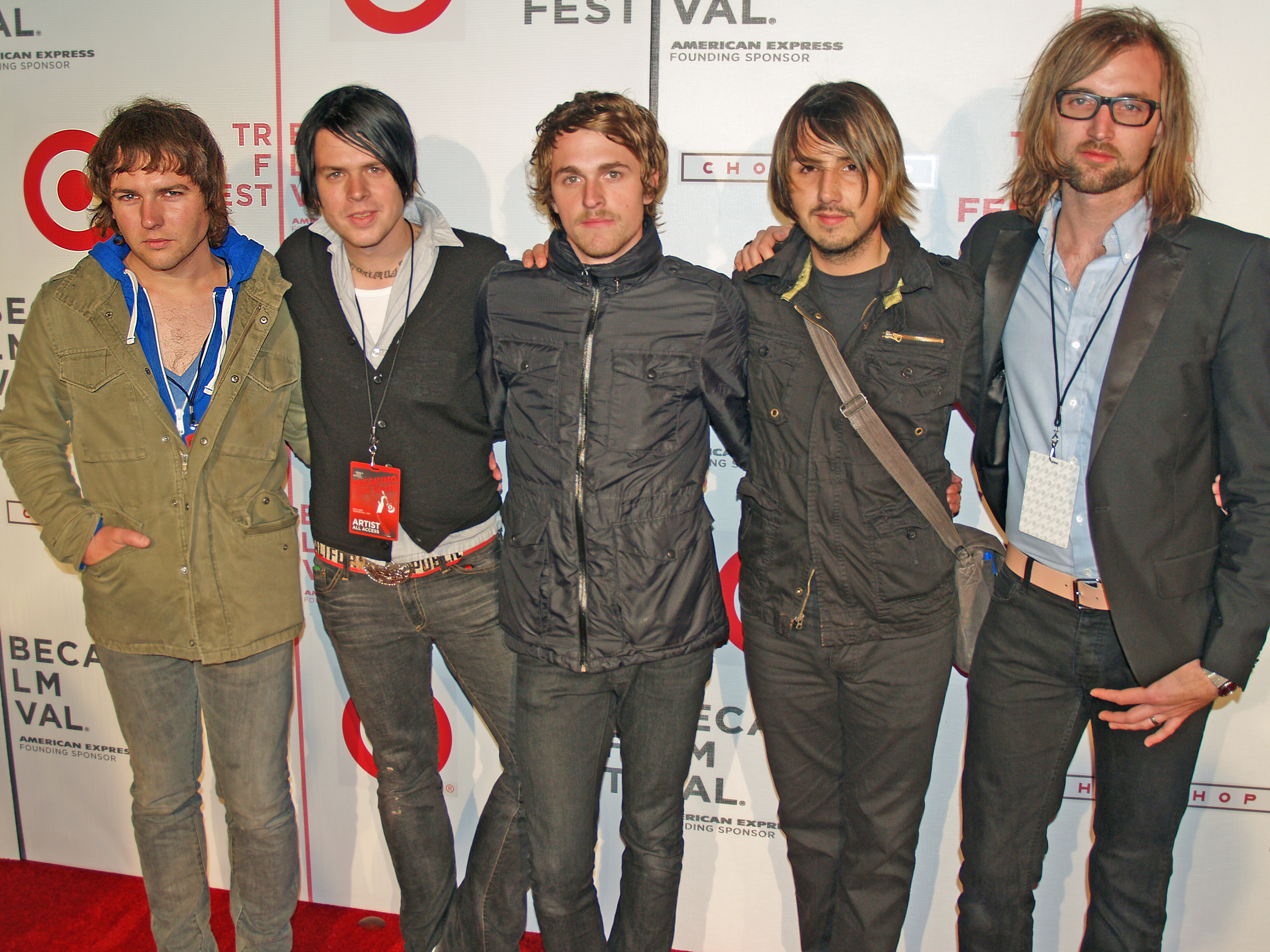

Background information
- Origin: Kansas City, Missouri
- Genres: Alternative rock
- Labels: Chop Shop, Record Machine

The Republic Tigers is an American alternative rock band formed in Kansas City, Missouri by Kenn Jankowski (formerly of The Golden Republic) and Adam McGill. They were the first act to sign with Chop Shop Records (an imprint of Atlantic Records), owned by Alexandra Patsavas of Chop Shop Music Supervision.

== History ==
Hailing from Kansas City, The Republic Tigers were founded by Kenn Jankowski. He originally moved to Kansas City in 1999 and began playing guitar for The People, a band that later changed its name to The Golden Republic (Astralwerks Records). He also became friends with local musician Ryan Pinkston. When The Golden Republic disbanded seven years later, he opted to launch his own pop-based project with the other multi-instrumentalist. Taking their name from Jankowski's high school mascot, The Republic Tigers expanded their lineup and issued a self-titled EP in late 2007 before putting the finishing touches on Keep Color, which arrived in 2008.

The group released their first full album, Keep Color, on May 6, 2008. It includes the singles "Buildings & Mountains" and "Fight Song". On the week of September 14, 2008, "Buildings & Mountains" was featured as the free single of the week on iTunes. In late 2008, they embarked on their first overseas tour with the band Travis. In 2009, they played at the annual "Buzz Beach Ball" event with Weezer, Blink 182, Matt & Kim, Taking Back Sunday, and others.

Since signing with Chop Shop Records, their music has been featured on several prime time network television shows including Grey's Anatomy, Gossip Girl, Chuck, Supernatural and Sunao ni Narenakute.

The Republic Tigers made their first nationally televised appearance on May 22, 2008 on the Late Show with David Letterman.

No Land’s Man (EP) was released on April 16, 2011, exclusively at indie record stores nationwide in celebration of Record Store Day. The digital release followed on April 19, as well as a 7” color vinyl release featuring "Merrymake It With Me" and an exclusive b-side, "Whale Fight". The album was self-produced and recorded in Kansas City, MO and features a remix of "The Nerve" off of their 2008 Keep Color release.

The band had previously announced their second full-length album for release in 2012, to be titled Mind Over Matter, but due to "legal boundaries or hoops", the album was released for the first time on June 5, 2020 on the Record Machine label.

Frontman Kenn Jankowski began a side project in 2012, Jaenki.

A new single, "Risky Business" was released in 2020 on the Record Machine.

== Members ==
Current:

- Kenn Jankowski - vocals, guitar, synth, programming
- Ryan Pinkston - guitar, vocals - studio
- Dedric Moore - guitar, synth, background vocals
- Krystof Nemeth - bass guitar
- Mikal Shapiro - background vocals, acoustic guitar
- Matthew Heinrich - drums
- Lucas Behrens - guitar, baritone guitar, synth, background vocals

Former members:

- Brent Windler - bass
- Justin Tricomi - drums, vocals
- Ryan Wallace - lead guitar, keyboard

Also, audio engineer and musician David Gaume (The Stella Link) has become a fixture in the band as their traveling soundman and technician.

- Justin Norcross - guitar, vocals
- Matt Casey - guitar, vocals
- Marc Pepperman - bass
- Adam McGill - guitar, vocals

== Discography ==
=== Compilations ===
- First Blood OxBlood Records. May 2007.
- The Impossible Dream Frank Sinatra cover.

=== EPs ===
- Republic Tigers (Self-titled) Chop Shop Records. December 2007.
- The Republic Tigers European Release
- No Land's Man Chop Shop Records. April 2011.

=== LPs ===
- Keep Color Chop Shop Records. May 2008.
- Mind Over Matter Record Machine. June 2020.

=== Soundtracks ===
- OMFGG - Original Music Featured on Gossip Girl No. 1 Atlantic Records. September 2008.
