= Cool World (Chat Pile album) =

Studio album by Chat Pile
- Released: October 11, 2024
- Recorded: 2024
- Genres: Noise rock; sludge metal
- Length: 42:47
- Label: The Flenser

Chat Pile chronology
Brothers in Christ (2023)	Cool World (2024)	In the Earth Again (2025)

Singles from Cool World
- 1. "I Am Dog Now" Released: July 16, 2024; 2. "Masc" Released: August 20, 2024; 3. "Funny Man" Released: September 24, 2024

Cool World is the second studio album by American rock band Chat Pile. It was released on October 11, 2024, through the Flenser.

Like its predecessor, the album received universal critical acclaim and placed on several publications' year-end lists.

== Background and theme ==
Cool World borrows its title from the film of the same name (1992), setting the tone for an "unsettling atmosphere" with a horizon widened to depict a "decaying planet". It serves as a continuation of their 2022 debut album God's Country, "only amped up". Vocalist Raygun Busch explained that the project covers "similar themes" to their previous album but this time expanded to a "macro scale", focusing on "disasters abroad, at home" as well as their impact. Busch states the album is "about the price at which we eat sugar in America," referencing a quote by French philosopher Voltaire. Bassist Stin added that the goal was to "stretch the definition" of their sound in order to touch on their personal tastes beyond just noise rock and "challenge" the limits of their previous record.

The album was mixed by Ben Greenberg of Uniform which marks the first time Chat Pile worked with a mixing assistant from outside of the band.

Lyrically, the album touches upon poverty, war, and American imperialism. The song "Shame" criticizes the Gaza war referencing the genocide in Palestine. The album's artwork displays a giant cross from a megachurch north of Oklahoma City, off of Interstate 35.

== Singles ==
Alongside the album announcement on July 16, 2024, the band released the lead single and opening track "I Am Dog Now", described as a "chunky, grating, post-hardcore/noise rock anthem", accompanied by a Will Mecca-directed video. According to Busch, "Masc", the second single released on August 20, was one of the most important songs on the album as it talks about the "horrors of interpersonal intimacy" but is still in sync with the theme of "oppression, despair and malaise" throughout the album. The third single "Funny Man" came out on September 24 and sees the band delivering a "seething, freaked-out rager" that ranges between "head-crushing riffs" and "90s-style funk-metal".

== Critical reception ==
Professional ratings
Aggregate scores
Source	Rating
AnyDecentMusic?	8.0/10
Metacritic	84/100
Review scores
Source	Rating
AllMusic	4.5/5 stars
Exclaim!	8/10
Kerrang	4/5 stars
The Line of Best Fit	9/10
Metal Injection	8/10
Paste	7.9/10
Pitchfork	7.7/10
PopMatters	8/10
Slant Magazine	3.5/5 stars
Sputnikmusic	5/5 stars

At Metacritic, which assigns a normalized rating out of 100 to reviews from mainstream publications, Cool World received an average score of 84 based on 13 reviews, indicating "universal acclaim". Writing for The Line of Best Fit, John Amen gave the album a score of 9/10, concluding that "Cool World is instrumentally gripping, vocally enthralling, and lyrically calls out the horrors of late-stage capitalism".

=== Year-end lists ===
Select year-end rankings for Cool World
Publication/critic	Accolade	Rank	Ref.
Consequence	50 Best Albums of 2024	19	
Crack	The Top 50 Albums of 2024	44	
Decibel	Top 40 Albums of 2024	27	
Exclaim!	50 Best Albums of 2024	7	
Stereogum	The 50 Best Albums of 2024	21	

== Track listing ==
All tracks are written by Chat Pile.

Cool World track listing
No.	Title	Length
1.	"I Am Dog Now"	3:53
2.	"Shame"	3:45
3.	"Frownland"	3:55
4.	"Funny Man"	3:30
5.	"Camcorder"	6:23
6.	"Tape"	4:12
7.	"The New World"	4:30
8.	"Masc"	4:09
9.	"Milk of Human Kindness"	4:49
10.	"No Way Out"	3:35
Total length:		42:47

== Personnel ==
Chat Pile

- Raygun Busch – vocals, recording, photography
- Luther Manhole – guitar, glockenspiel, recording, photography
- Stin – bass, tape loops, synthesizer, recording, photography
- Cap'n Ron – drums, recording, photography

Additional contributors

- Matt Colton – mastering
- Ben Greenberg – mixing

== Charts ==
Chart performance for Cool World
Chart (2024)	Peak position
Belgian Albums (Ultratop Flanders)	153
