= Milo Greene =

American rock band

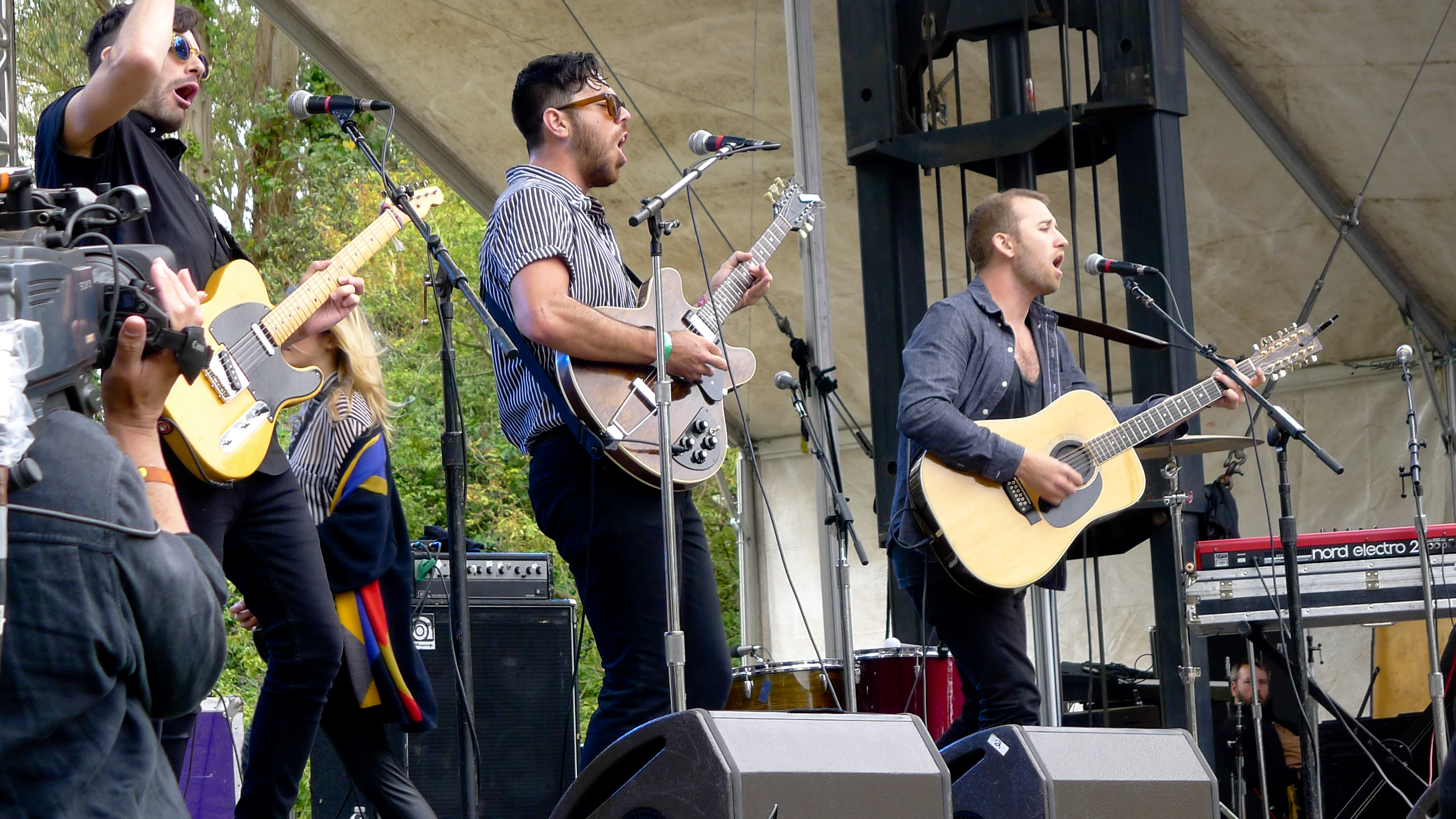
- Milo Greene in 2013

Background information
- Origin: Los Angeles, California, U.S.
- Genres: Indie rock
- Years active: 2010–present
- Labels: Chop Shop; Atlantic; Elektra; Nettwerk
- Members: Robbie Arnett; Graham Fink; Marlana Sheetz
- Past members: Andrew Heringer; Curtis Marrero
- Website: milogreene.com

Milo Greene is an American indie rock band formed in Los Angeles. The band started as a quintet but became a trio, with members Robbie Arnett, Graham Fink and Marlana Sheetz.

== History ==
=== Self-titled debut album (2012–2015) ===
Sheetz described their sound to CBS News by explaining, "Originally when we started this band we wanted to create music that we could potentially see being placed in movies and TV." They released their self-titled debut album on July 4, 2012. On October 6, 2012, the group released a short film entitled Moddison as a companion to the album. Written by the band and directed by Chad Huff, the film consists of a series of individual music videos for every song on Milo Greene. It was filmed over a span of five days at a cabin on Shaver Lake in California.

Milo Greene is the name of a fictitious booking agent, a persona created by the band to help them get gigs in the early days of playing shows. The band decided to use the name of their fictitious booking agent for the group.

=== Control (2015–2018) ===
On September 30, 2014, Milo Greene announced that their second album, Control, would be released on January 27, 2015. They described the new album's tone as a departure from the more folk-based sounds of their previous work, instead sounding more upbeat and percussive.

=== Adult Contemporary (2018–present) ===
Milo Greene released third album titled Adult Contemporary on September 7, 2018. The lead single "Move" was released in May.

== Members ==
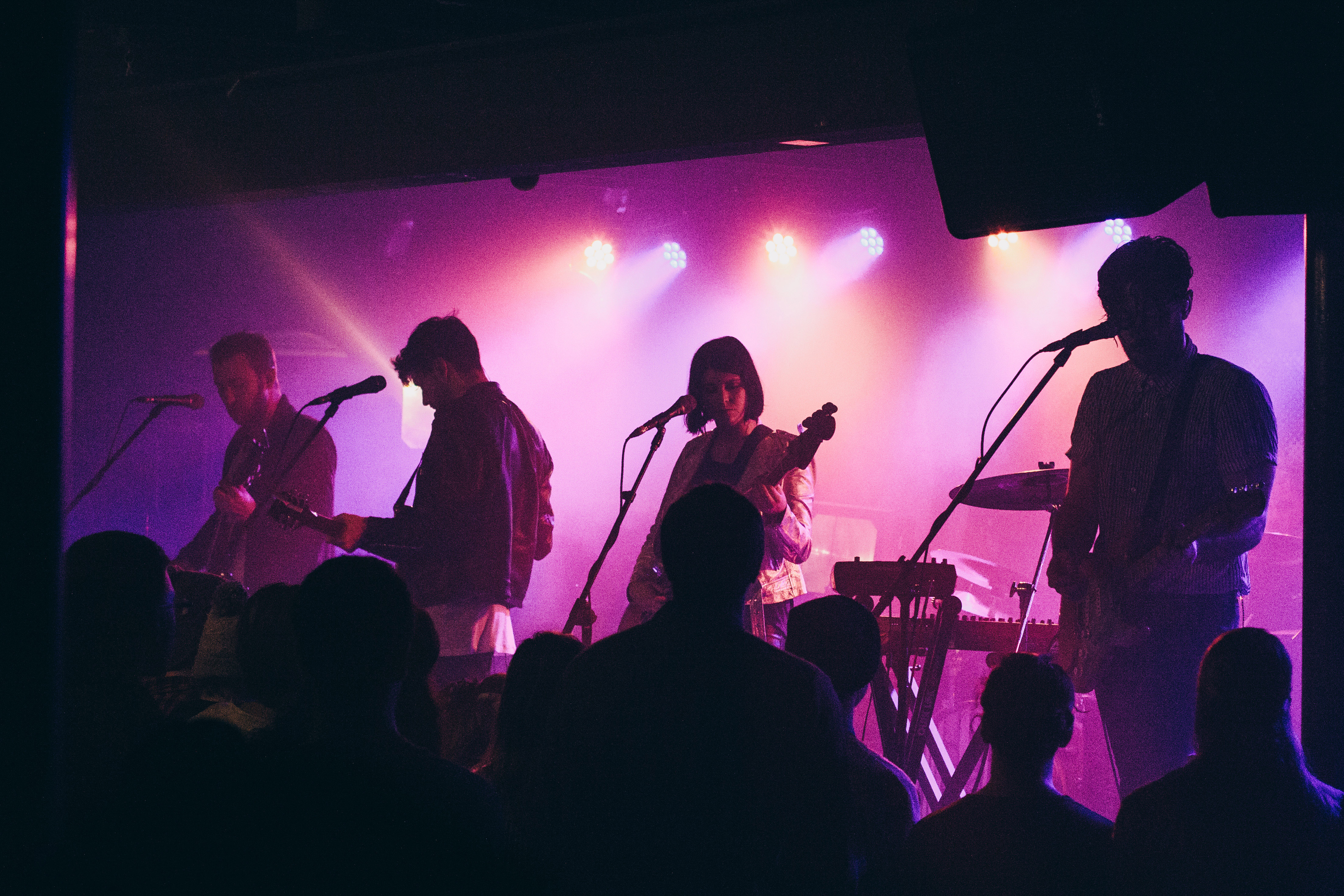
Milo Greene performing in 2014

Current members

- Robbie Arnett – vocals, various instruments
- Marlana Sheetz – vocals, various instruments
- Graham Fink – vocals, various instruments

Past members

- Andrew Heringer – vocals, guitar
- Curtis Marrero – percussion

== Discography ==
=== Albums ===
Year	Album
2012	Milo Greene: Released: July 17, 2012; Labels: Chop Shop, Atlantic; Format: Digital, CD, vinyl
2015	Control: Released: January 27, 2015; Labels: Chop Shop, Elektra; Format: Digital, CD, vinyl
2018	Adult Contemporary: Released: September 7, 2018; Labels: Nettwerk; Format: Digital, CD, vinyl

=== Singles ===
- "1957" (2012) #19 Adult Alternative Songs
- "On the Fence" (2015)
- "Move" (2018) #30 Adult Alternative Songs

=== Music videos ===
Year	Song
2012	"1957"
2012	"Silent Way"
2012	"What's the Matter"
2018	"Move"
