= Kyle Holmes =

American playwright (born 1989)

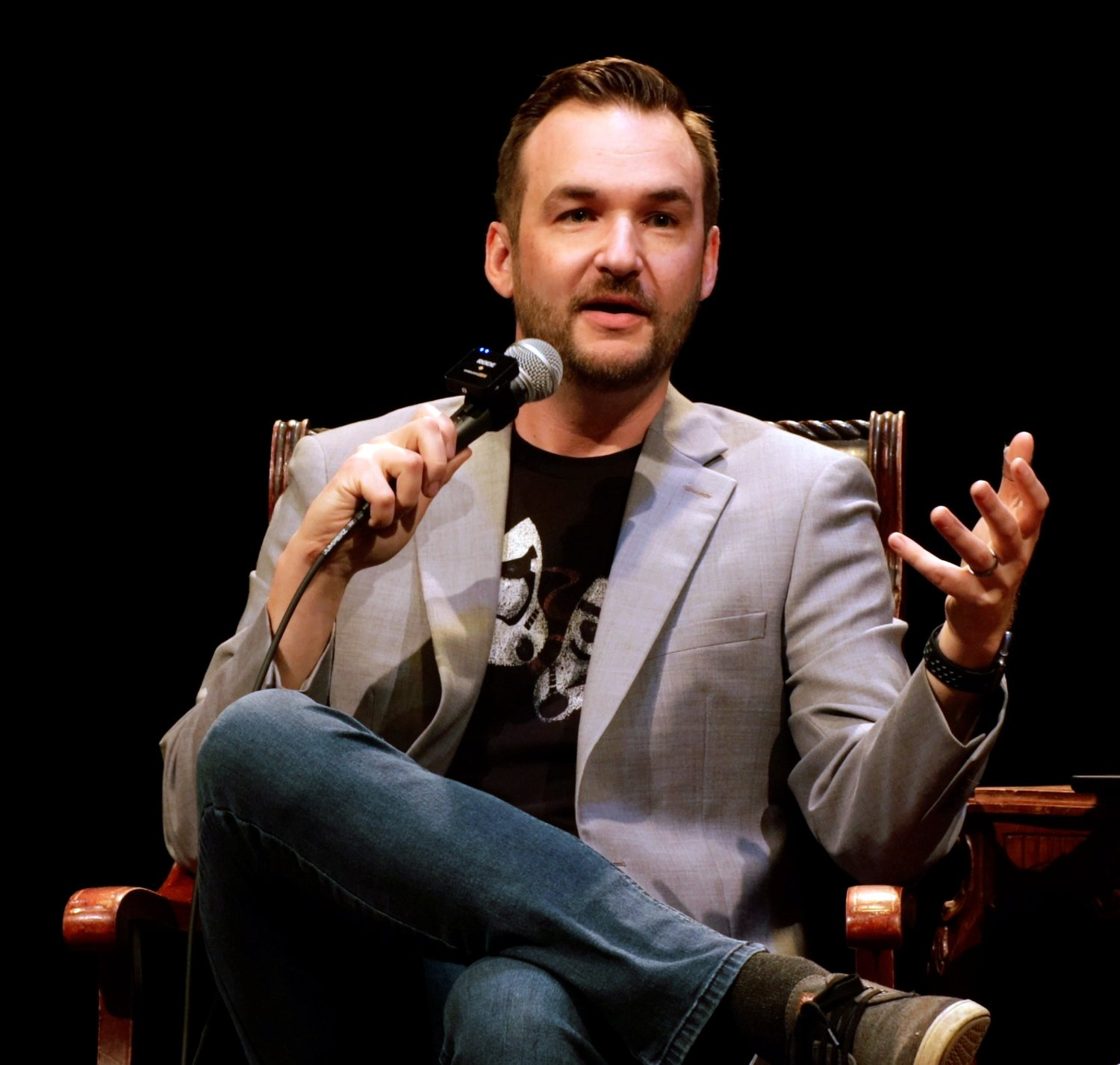
- Born: March 23, 1989 (age 37)
- Education: UC Davis (BA) (MFA)
- Occupations: Playwright, educator
- Website: kpholmes.com

Kyle Holmes (born March 23, 1989) is an American educator, playwright and producer best known for writing the book to Ranked, a Musical. He, his collaborator David Taylor Gomes, and their musical Ranked is the subject of the 2022 HBO feature documentary, My So-Called High School Rank.

Holmes is a co-founder of Uproar Theatrics, an all-digital theatrical licensing company. Ranked, a Musical was included in the company's original catalog for its launch in 2021.

== Early life ==
Holmes was born in Sacramento, California and grew up in Placerville, California, where he attended Union Mine High School. He attended the University of California, Irvine for two years, majoring in theatre, before finishing his undergraduate degree at University of California, Davis. He received his M.A. in education in 2012 there.

== Career ==
Holmes began teaching English at Granite Bay High School in 2011. He took over as Director of Theatre Arts the following year. He began writing musicals in 2017 with collaborator David Taylor Gomes.

== Ranked, a Musical ==
In the spring of 2018, Holmes and Gomes began writing Ranked, a Musical for Holmes' students at Granite Bay High School. The play focuses on academic pressure, with the central plot following a student whose parents paid for their grades. The show debuted on April 4, 2019 at Granite Bay High School just weeks after the 2019 college admissions bribery scandal broke, attracting national attention.

After developing the show at UC Davis, in the fall of 2019, it was announced that the musical's journey towards a commercial production would be filmed for an HBO documentary. My So-Called High School Rank was released on HBO and HBO Max on November 29, 2022.

Ranked has been licensed and performed by schools around the world.
