= I'll Be Waving as You Drive Away (album) =

Studio album by Hayden Pedigo
- Released: June 6, 2025
- Studio: Echo Magic (Ojai); The Shed (Nashville)
- Genre: American primitivism
- Length: 28:50
- Label: Mexican Summer
- Producer: Scott Hirsch

Hayden Pedigo chronology
| The Happiest Times I Ever Ignored (2023) | I'll Be Waving as You Drive Away (2025) |

Singles from I'll Be Waving as You Drive Away
- 1. "Long Pond Lily" Released: April 8, 2025; 2. "I'll Be Waving as You Drive Away" Released: May 7, 2025

I'll Be Waving as You Drive Away is the fifth studio album by American fingerstyle guitarist and avant-garde musician Hayden Pedigo. It was released on June 6, 2025, through Mexican Summer, in vinyl, CD and digital formats.

== Background ==
The album, consisting of eight tracks with a total runtime of approximately thirty minutes, succeeds Pedigo's 2023 project, The Happiest Times I Ever Ignored. It was produced, mixed, and recorded by Scott Hirsch, and mastered by Stephan Mathieu. The first single of the album was released on April 8, 2025, titled "Long Pond Lily". Pedigo refers to the album as the final installment in his "The Motor Trilogy", consisting of the album and its two predecessors. The title track was released as the second and final single on May 7, 2025.

The album is named after an episode of American television series Little House on the Prairie of the same name.

== Reception ==
Professional ratings
Review scores
| Source | Rating |
|---|---|
| AllMusic | 4/5 stars |
| Beats Per Minute | 75% |
| Clash | 8/10 |
| Pitchfork | 8.3/10 |
| Uncut | 8/10 stars |

AllMusic's Timothy Monger referred to the album as "another quiet gem from an artist in the full bloom of his talents". Nathan Skinner of Beats Per Minute gave the album a score of 75%, stating "Along these lines, there are characteristics of a hauntological record sprinkled throughout I'll Be Waving – sounds pining for a mythical landscape that will never return (and arguably never even existed)." Uncut's Stephen Deusner rated the album eight out of ten and remarked, "These compositions are crammed with imaginative flourishes, like the electric guitar that adds a poignant psychedelia to 'Long Pond Lily'."

== Track listing ==
All tracks are written by Hayden Pedigo.

I'll Be Waving as You Drive Away track listing
| No. | Title | Length |
|---|---|---|
| 1. | "Long Pond Lily" | 4:26 |
| 2. | "All the Way Across" | 4:26 |
| 3. | "Smoked" | 5:18 |
| 4. | "Houndstooth" | 3:52 |
| 5. | "Hermes" | 3:40 |
| 6. | "Small Torch" | 3:22 |
| 7. | "I'll Be Waving as You Drive Away" | 3:46 |
| Total length: | | 28:50 |

== Personnel ==
Credits adapted from the album's liner notes.

- Hayden Pedigo – acoustic guitar, electric guitar, electric piano, arrangements
- Scott Hirsch – production, recording, mixing, bass, synthesizer, EBow guitar, cymbals, arrangements
- Nathan Bieber – violin, string arrangements
- Noah Kittinger – strings recording and engineering
- Stephan Mathieu – mastering
- Jens Kuross – piano on "All the Way Across"
- Nicole Lawrence – pedal steel on "I'll Be Waving as You Drive Away"
- Jonathan Phillips – album cover painting
- Ryan Giesbrecht – back cover photo
- Alex Tults – layout, design
