= Milo Greene (album) =

Studio album by Milo Greene
- Released: July 17, 2012
- Studio: Bear Creek Studios
- Genres: Indie folk, folk rock
- Length: 36:36
- Labels: Chop Shop, Atlantic
- Producers: The Cymbalhands, Ryan Hadlock

Milo Greene is the debut studio album by Los Angeles–based band Milo Greene. It was released on July 17, 2012 and peaked at number one on the US Billboard Heatseekers Albums chart and number 115 on the Billboard 200 albums chart.

== Background and recording ==
The band recorded Milo Greene in California and at Bear Creek Studios in Seattle. The lead vocals, guitars, bass, and banjo parts were shared by band members Robbie Arnett, Marlana Sheetz, Andrew Heringer and Graham Fink. The group's fifth member, Curtis Marrero, played drums. Album closer "Autumn Tree" was the first song the band wrote. Arnett explained that at the time, "we were still in our other bands, and Andrew was living up in Sacramento, and I was in L.A., and I had sent him some lyrics, and said 'why don’t we try to experiment. I'll send you lyrics, and see if you can put some melodies over it.' He sent that back, so we started going back and forth with melodies, and that’s kind of how that one happened." Fink noted that creating songs for the album was "definitely a collaborative process" in which any number of band members would start an idea for a given song. Several brief interludes and instrumentals were included on the album, Arnett said, "because we wanted it to flow together like a film." One of these tracks, "Moddison", was named after a Sacramento street where Heringer lived. A music video for lead single "1957", also named after an address, premiered in advance of the album's July 2012 release.

== Critical reception ==
Professional ratings
Review scores
Source	Rating
AllMusic	3.5/5 stars
Consequence of Sound	3.5/5 stars
Filter	84/100

AllMusic's Matt Collar likened Sheetz's voice to "Sarah McLachlan fronting Fleetwood Mac" and described the album as "a languid, evocative exercise in harmony-infused pop." Megan Ritt of Consequence of Sound called Milo Greene "a gorgeously arranged and executed album", but noted that "the overall formula itself gets repetitive after a few listens." Filter's Daniel Kohn said that the album "has a familiar '70s Laurel Canyon–esque vibe that fits nicely in the Los Angeles indie-folk scene." Ron Harris of the Associated Press described it as "a tapestry of richly reverbed guitar, inventive drum work and something sorely missing amid today’s morass of arrange-by-numbers rock music". Chuck Campbell of Knoxville News Sentinel wrote that the album, while "often intoxicating", has "an icky, overly sweet taste that sours the enjoyment ... especially as the release gets stuck in fuzzy redundancy."

== Track listing ==
No.	Title	Length
1.	"What's the Matter"	4:28
2.	"Orpheus"	0:28
3.	"Don't You Give Up On Me"	3:18
4.	"Perfectly Aligned"	3:01
5.	"Silent Way"	3:24
6.	"1957"	3:24
7.	"Wooden Antlers"	1:38
8.	"Take a Step"	3:40
9.	"Moddison"	0:46
10.	"Cutty Love"	3:59
11.	"Son My Son"	3:32
12.	"Polaroid"	1:07
13.	"Autumn Tree"	3:51

== Charts ==
Chart (2012)	Peak position
US Billboard 200	115
US Americana/Folk Albums (Billboard)	5
US Top Rock Albums (Billboard)	39
US Heatseekers Albums (Billboard)	1
