= The Acid =

Electronic music band

- Genres: Electronica, minimal
- Years active: 2013–present
- Labels: Infectious, Mute
- Members: Adam Freeland; Steve Nalepa; Jens Kuross; RY X
- Website: wearetheacid.com

The Acid are an electronic music quartet consisting of British DJ and record producer Adam Freeland; Californian producer, composer, and professor of music technology Steve Nalepa; American singer/songwriter Jens Kuross; and Los Angeles–based Australian artist RY X.

On April 14, 2013, the group released their debut, self-titled EP, along with a video for the track "Basic Instinct". On July 7, 2014, they released their first full-length album, Liminal, on Infectious Music (UK) and Mute Records (US).

In 2017, the band released their soundtrack to the film The Bomb, on 12" vinyl.

In 2018, several songs from the album Liminal, including "Tumbling Lights" and "Ghost", were featured in the HBO series Sharp Objects.

== Band members ==
- Adam Freeland
- Steve Nalepa
- Jens Kuross
- RY X

== Discography ==
- The Acid (EP, 2013)
- Liminal (2014)
- The Bomb (Original Motion Picture Soundtrack) (2017)
