= Granite Bay High School =

Public school in California, United States

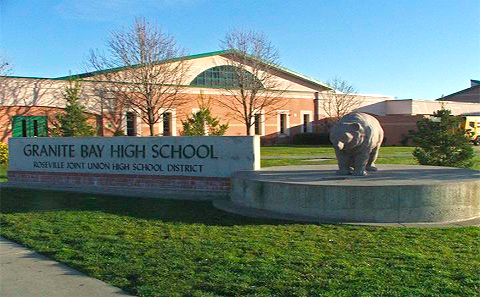

Location
- 1 Grizzly Way; Granite Bay, California 95746; United States; 38°43′55″N 121°12′48″W

Information
- Type: Public
- Established: 1996
- School district: Roseville Joint Union High School District
- Principal: Greg Sloan
- Teaching staff: 86.90 (on a FTE basis)
- Grades: 9–12
- Enrollment: 2,005 (2023–2024)
- Student to teacher ratio: 23.07
- Colors: Green, silver & black
- Nickname: Grizzly Bears
- Newspaper: Granite Bay Gazette
- Website: granitebay.rjuhsd.us

Granite Bay High School is located in Granite Bay, California, United States. Granite Bay High School was founded in 1996 and was named a National Blue Ribbon School by the United States Secretary of Education in 2002 and a California Distinguished School in 2007. It is one of the five comprehensive schools in the Roseville Joint Union High School District. Granite Bay High School has more than 20 Advanced Placement classes, and is one of two schools in Roseville Joint Union High School District to have the International Baccalaureate program.

== Extracurricular activities ==
=== Film and Media ===
Granite Bay High School has a media CTE AME Career Pathway that focuses on GBTV and film projects. They are a winner of numerous Student Television Network awards including the National Academy of Television Arts & Sciences Regional Student Television Production Awards for Excellence.

=== Theatre arts ===
Granite Bay High School has a full-time theatre arts department, offering beginning, intermediate and advanced level acting courses, as well as musical theatre and technical theatre. Productions are staged in the James T. Prichard Performing Arts Center, the 500-seat theater on campus named after the high school's late theatre arts teacher, who retired in 2011.

In 2018, Theatre at Granite Bay premiered Ranked, a new musical written by then GBHS theatre director Kyle Holmes and musical director, David Taylor Gomes. The musical focuses on academic pressure that GBHS students faced, and launched the school's theatre program into the national spotlight during the 2019 College Admission Scandal.

=== Band programs ===
Granite Bay has a marching band known as the Emerald Brigade, as well as 2 concert ensembles and a jazz band. The Emerald Brigade has won multiple awards.

=== Choir ===
Granite Bay has four choirs: Baritone, Treble, Concert and Chamber.

=== Game Development ===
The Granite Bay High School game development club teaches and develops games using the Unity game engine along with its related assets. As a subsection of the club, their competitive game development team creates multiplayer games using the Unity game engine and the PUN2 networking solution for competition in global game markets and game jams.

=== Science Olympiad ===
Granite Bay High School has a Science Olympiad team now in its sixth year of operation. They are a member of Sacramento Regional Science Olympiad.

=== Athletic teams ===
==== Fall teams ====
Cross Country; Freshman, Junior Varsity, and Varsity, Football; Women's Golf; Women's Tennis; Women's Freshman, Junior Varsity, and Varsity Volleyball; Men's Junior Varsity, and Varsity Water Polo; Women's Junior Varsity, and Varsity Water Polo

==== Winter teams ====
Men's Freshman, Junior Varsity, and Varsity Basketball; Women's Freshman, Junior Varsity, and Varsity Basketball; Men's Junior Varsity, and Varsity Soccer; Women's Junior Varsity, and Varsity Soccer; Wrestling

==== Spring teams ====
Men's Freshman, Junior Varsity, and Varsity Baseball; Distance Track; Track and Field; Men's Junior Varsity, and Varsity Golf; Men's lacrosse; Women's lacrosse; Women's Junior Varsity, and Varsity Softball; Swimming; Men's Tennis; Men's Junior Varsity, and Varsity Volleyball

== Notable alumni ==
- Alyssa Anderson – Olympic swimmer
- Haley Anderson – Olympic swimmer
- Miles Burris – Actor and former NFL linebacker
- Kevin Dahlgren – US national convicted of murdering four relatives in Czech Republic in 2013
- Natalie Gulbis – LPGA golfer
- Ryan Holiday (2005) – bestselling author and director of marketing, American Apparel
- Adam Jennings (2001) – former wide receiver for the Atlanta Falcons
- Kevin Kiley (2003) – California State Assemblyman
- Andrew Knapp (2010) - catcher for the Pittsburgh Pirates
- Alicia Parlette – copy editor and former columnist at the San Francisco Chronicle
- Dallas Sartz (2002) – former linebacker for the Washington Redskins and Seattle Seahawks
- Cameron Smith (2015) – linebacker for the Minnesota Vikings
- Sammie Stroughter (2004) – Oregon State University and Tampa Bay Buccaneers football player
- Peyton Thompson – NFL player Jacksonville Jaguars
- Tommy Thompson (2013) - "Homegrown" American MLS soccer player with the San Jose Earthquakes
- Devon Wylie (2007) – former wide receiver for Fresno State and 2012 NFL draft pick of the Kansas City Chiefs
