= Scars on 45 =

English indie rock band

- Origin: Bradford, City of Bradford, UK
- Genres: Indie rock, indie pop
- Years active: 2007-present
- Label: Nettwerk Music Group
- Members: Danny Bemrose; Aimee Driver
- Past members: Stuart Nichols Chris Durling David “Nova” Nowakowski
- Website: www.scarson45.com

Scars on 45 are an English indie rock band from Bradford.

== Recent success ==
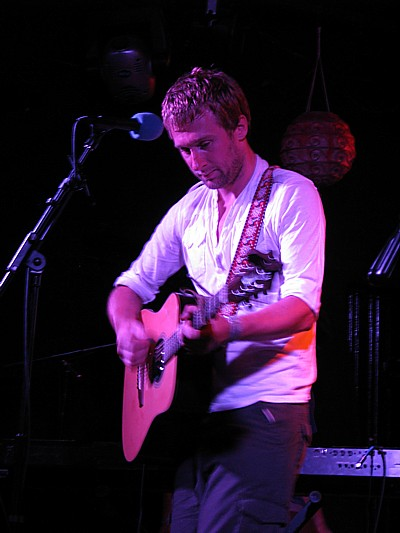
Danny Bemrose of Scars on 45 during performance at The Saint, Asbury Park, NJ, July 2011

After years struggling to become known in England, the band rose from obscurity when their song "Beauty's Running Wild" was featured in an episode of CSI: New York.

The band were soon signed to Atlantic Records' Chop Shop Records label, which has been successful in getting previously unsigned bands heard through song placements in popular TV programmes. The band's single, "Heart on Fire" was selected as the lead song for the eighth series's soundtrack on ABC's top-rated hospital drama, Grey's Anatomy.

Scars on 45's first EP, Give Me Something, was released in January 2011 and yielded a hit single of the same name that rose to the top 5 of the Adult Alternative Charts and was recognised as one of the "Top 3 Singles of the Year" by Amazon.com. The quintette was also named to Entertainment Weekly's "Must List".

Their second EP, which also features "Heart on Fire", was released on 24 October 2011.

The band released Scars on 45, their first full-length studio album, on 10 April 2012. The album was selected by the editors at Amazon.com as number 7 out of 50 "Best Albums of 2012".

Their second full-length studio album was called Safety in Numbers, and was released 7 October 2014.

The band's third studio album was called Satellite Town, and was released 3 August 2018.

Their newest release is a single, entitled Silhouettes, which was released on 8 September 2026.

== History ==
=== Early years (2007 - 2009) ===
When a broken foot ended lead singer Danny Bemrose's professional football career as a striker for Huddersfield Town A.F.C., he earnestly decided to learn how to play his father's guitar. After his injury, Bemrose struck up a close friendship with another former footballer, Stuart Nichols, who had played for rival Bradford City A.F.C. Bemrose taught Nichols to play bass as they spent the next few years improving their skills and making computer recordings to develop their music. After adding pianist/keyboard player David "Nova" Nowakowski, the band began playing the local music scene, rounding out their performances with a variety of other guitarists and drummers that came and went over time.

When Bemrose wrote "Insecurity", which is featured on the Heart on Fire EP, the band began looking for a female singer that could complement his vocals. Soon thereafter, Nova was at home playing The Cure's "Friday I'm in Love" while his visiting schoolmate, Aimee Driver, was making a cup of tea and chimed in with the lyrics. "I just started singing along when Nova rushed in seeming really shocked," Driver recalls. "I thought his dad had a heart attack or something! He made me stand there in his living room and sing to him - which was the scariest thing ever at the time. At first I wouldn't do it, but he wouldn't shut up so I just put my tea down, shut my eyes and sang...just to stop him pestering me. Danny recorded me on 'Insecurity'. The next thing I knew I was in the band. When I told my family and friends they were saying, 'but you can't sing, can you?'" Before joining the band, Driver had never performed in public.

Stuart Nichols recruited drummer Chris Durling after meeting him in a pub and giving him a CD of the band's music. After a late night out, Durling returned to his house and gave it a listen. He enjoyed the results and agreed to work with them on recordings. He ended up becoming the final member of the band a short time later.

The band had difficulties deciding on a name. They realised that a name was critical after a chance meeting with one of their musical influences, Noel Gallagher of Oasis. A friend introduced Nichols and Bemrose to Gallagher who asked the band's name, but they did not have one. "A band with no name?" Gallagher reportedly asked, "What kind of fucking band is that?" and walked off on them.

The name Scars on 45 comes from an Emmylou Harris interview Bemrose heard in which she talks about scratching up her dad's records and being scolded by him for getting "Scars on his 45's", and is also a play on a Dutch medley act from the 1980s whose group name and records alternately used versions of the phrase "Stars on 45". 'Scars on 45' was one of the few names considered that band members did not dismiss out of hand.

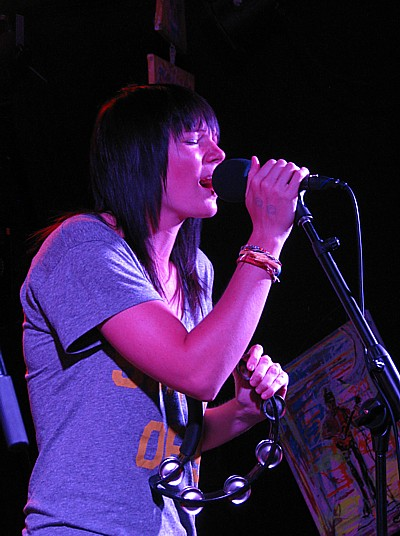
Aimee Driver during performance at The Saint, Asbury Park, NJ, July 2011

=== 2010 – 2020 ===
On several occasions, the band was poised on the brink of success only to have their hopes for a record deal dashed at the last moment. When their song "Beauty's Running Wild" was selected for an extended closing scene of an episode of CSI: New York, they finally had a select amount of money in hand to purchase equipment for recording. They also caught the ear of TV music supervisor Alex Patsavas. At the time, Patsavas had just entered an agreement with Atlantic Records to acquire her Chop Shop label under which the band is now signed.

Their EP Give Me Something was released digitally by Chop Shop Records in January 2011, and the physical EP came out in June. A video for the single "Give Me Something", produced by DJ Brauner, turned out a bit darker and sadder than originally scripted. "The video was weird," explained Bemrose. "It tells the tale of young kids that fall in love, going through the years, and at the very end, the old fella walks back to the tree where they'd carved their names, and she's passed away. That's not how it was supposed to be. There was an old woman cast to play the part, so at the end, both were going to be there and fall in love again, but [the actor] couldn't be bothered to turn up, so we just killed her off."

On 13 September 2011, the Grey's Anatomy Vol. 4 soundtrack was released featuring "Heart on Fire" as the lead track. The song was also used heavily in ABC's TV promotion of the new season, and a music video directed by Jordan Bahat was produced with the band for the ABC Music Lounge. In addition to CSI: New York and Grey's Anatomy, they have also had their music featured on TV's One Tree Hill, The Cleaner, Pretty Little Liars, Warehouse 13, Lost Girl, and Supernatural. Their second EP with Chop Shop Records, Heart on Fire, debuted on 24 October 2011, as well as the band's cut of the music video, also directed by Bahat.

In the winter of 2012, the band conducted their first headlining tour of North America, featuring support from solo artist Anya Marina who is also signed to Atlantic's Chop Shop record label. Scars on 45 also participated in a west coast tour with The Fray in February 2012. After supporting The Fray, Scars on 45 resumed the final dates of their headline tour. The band made their American network television debut as musical guests on The Tonight Show with Jay Leno on Friday, 2 March 2012. The band's self-titled debut album, Scars on 45, was released on 10 April 2012. In support of the album, Apple's iTunes featured the album's 6th track, "Burn the House Down", as the free "single of the week". The album also entered Billboard's "Heatseekers" album chart in the number 4 position. Scars on 45 played some solo dates in April, and toured with singer Ingrid Michaelson for dates in May 2012. After that they headlined throughout the summer and played additional dates in support of The Voice finalist Dia Frampton. On 10 August 2012, Scars on 45 played a show back home in Bradford, Yorkshire, England, at The Live Lounge (also known as Utopia) which was a venue dedicated to supporting local musicians. In September 2012 Scars on 45 embarked on their first European tour, supporting American recording artist/songwriter Joshua Radin, including dates in Sweden, The Netherlands, Germany, England, Scotland and Ireland. The band toured US with dates beginning in October 2012.

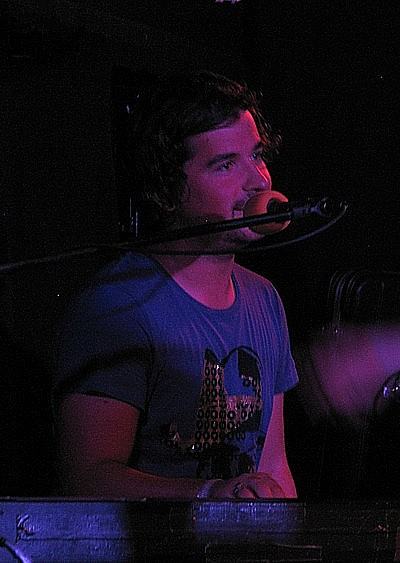
David Nowakowski on keyboards at The Saint, Asbury Park, NJ, July 2011

In early 2014 the band were touring the US and the UK to promote their album Safety In Numbers, which was released on 7 October 2014 in the US and 23 February in the UK.

In April 2015, the band released its Tasted Every Tear EP, with four tracks: the title track, "Runaway", "Show Me What I Want", and "Love Plays Blind". In late 2015, Scars on 45 was back in the US performing select private shows before heading back to the UK to work on their third record.

In November 2016, the hit CW television show Reign featured the band's song "Golden" in the 5th episode of season 3, titled "In a Clearing".

In October 2017, the band announced that Aimee made the decision to stop touring with the band for the foreseeable future (however she came back and had recently toured in America) . It was announced that Katie Dean would fill in for the remainder of shows in 2017 including their slot supporting Tori Amos.

On 3 August 2018 the band released their third studio album, Satellite Town.

The band had scheduled a limited dates American tour in June 2020 that would feature co-vocalist Aimee Driver, but due to the COVID-19 pandemic, all scheduled performances were cancelled. The band pivoted to perform virtually, including a performance for Downtown Boise's "Alive After Five" music series, and for ticketed performances streaming via Zoom. The band has used the time on lockdown to actively write and record new music for their 4th studio album.

=== 2021 – Present ===
In February 2021 Scars on 45 had four music credits in the movie short Patrick, three self penned songs "Love Can Tear Down Walls", "Soul Saver" and "Tomorrow Never Knows" and Lisa Swain Bennet's "Til Then".

The band's original lineup reunited for a show at the Leeds Beckett Students' Union on 25 January 2025.

The band released a single, entitled Silhouettes, on 8 September 2026 leading to the album We All Make Amends In The End on the 26th of September

== Band members ==
=== Current band members ===
- Danny Bemrose – lead vocals, acoustic guitar
- Aimee Driver – vocals, percussion

=== Past band members ===
- Stuart Nichols – bass guitar
- Chris Durling – drums, percussion
- David “Nova” Nowakowski — piano, vocals

== Discography ==
=== We All Make Amends In The End (2026) ===
- 1. A Dream Don't Come Easy
- 2 Breakaway
- 3. Silhouettes
- 4. It's Not You, It Will Always Be Me
- 5. The Outlaw
- 6. Everyday
- 7. The Friend We Can't Forget
- 8. The Stranger That I Was Before
- 9. Pictures of Polly
- 10. Wishing Well
- 11. We All Make Amends In The End

=== Satellite Town (2018) ===
1. Mad Little Thing Called Love
2. Mozambique
3. Teenage Superstar
4. You're The Proof
5. Family
6. Powerplay
7. Confessions
8. Troubadour
9. Satellite Town
10. Forever
11. Lighten Up The Dark
12. Just For You

=== Safety In Numbers (2014) ===
1. Golden
2. Crazy for You
3. Tasted Every Tear
4. I Don't Wanna Break
5. This Is Not Your Love Song
6. Only a Game
7. Higher and Higher
8. Feeling
9. My Eyes Are Still Bright
10. Take You Home
11. Fading Bright Eyes Dark

=== Scars on 45 (2012) ===
1. Warning Sign
2. Breakdown
3. Heart On Fire
4. Don't Say
5. Change My Needs
6. Burn The House Down
7. Give Me Something
8. Beauty's Running Wild
9. The Way That We Are
10. Insecurity
11. Loudest Alarm
12. Tomorrow Won't Die Too Soon
13. Two Way Radio
14. Promises And Empty Words
