= Kid Candidate =

- Official poster
- Directed by: Jasmine Stodel
- Produced by: Jasmine Stodel; Chevis LaBelle; William Dorrien-Smith
- Starring: Hayden Pedigo
- Cinematography: Homero Salinas
- Edited by: William Dorrien-Smith; Bryan Yokomi
- Production companies: Gunpowder & Sky; XTR
- Distributed by: Gunpowder & Sky
- Release dates: March 16, 2021 (SXSW); July 2, 2021 (United States)
- Running time: 67 minutes
- Country: United States
- Language: English

Kid Candidate is a 2021 American documentary film directed and produced by Jasmine Stodel. It follows Hayden Pedigo, who runs for city council in Amarillo, Texas.

It had its world premiere at South by Southwest on March 16, 2021. It was released on July 2, 2021, by Gunpowder & Sky.

== Synopsis ==
The film follows Hayden Pedigo, who runs for city council in Amarillo, Texas.

== Release ==
The film had its world premiere at South by Southwest on March 16, 2021. It was released on July 2, 2021, by Gunpowder & Sky.

== Reception ==
Kid Candidate holds an 82% approval rating on review aggregator website Rotten Tomatoes, based on 17 reviews, with a weighted average of 6.20/10.
