= Peyton Thompson =

American football player (born 1990)

No. 25
- Position: Safety

Personal information
- Born: September 26, 1990 (age 36); Abilene, Texas, U.S.
- Listed height: 5 ft 10 in (1.78 m)
- Listed weight: 184 lb (83 kg)

Career information
- High school: Granite Bay (Granite Bay, California)
- College: San Jose State
- NFL draft: 2012: undrafted

Career history
- Atlanta Falcons (2012)*; Washington Redskins (2013)*; Chicago Bears (2014)*; Jacksonville Jaguars (2014–2017)
- * Offseason or practice squad member only

Career NFL statistics
- Total tackles: 39
- Sacks: 0.5
- Pass deflections: 1
- Stats at Pro Football Reference

Peyton Bryce Thompson (born September 26, 1990) is an American former professional football player who was a safety in the National Football League (NFL). He played college football for the San Jose State Spartans. He was a member of the Atlanta Falcons, Washington Redskins, Chicago Bears and Jacksonville Jaguars.

== Early life ==
Thompson attended Granite Bay High School in Granite Bay, California.

== College career ==
Thompson played for the Spartans at San Jose State University from 2008 to 2011, recording 186 total tackles and seven interceptions.

== Professional career ==
Pre-draft measurables
Height	Weight	40-yard dash	10-yard split	20-yard split	20-yard shuttle	Three-cone drill	Vertical jump	Broad jump	Bench press
5 ft 10 1/2 in (1.79 m)	185 lb (84 kg)	4.46 s	1.56 s	2.61 s	4.35 s	7.39 s	36.0 in (0.91 m)	10 ft 9 in (3.28 m)	14 reps
All values from Pro Day

Thompson signed with the Atlanta Falcons on May 2, 2012, after going undrafted in the 2012 NFL draft. He was released by the Falcons on August 31 and signed to the team's practice squad on September 2, 2012. He was released by the Falcons on August 30, 2013.

Thompson was signed to the Washington Redskins' practice squad on November 27, 2013. He was released by the Redskins on August 9, 2014.

Thompson signed with the Chicago Bears on August 18, 2014, and was released by the Bears on August 23, 2014.

Thompson was signed to the Jacksonville Jaguars' practice squad on September 1, 2014. He was added to the team's active roster on October 25, 2014. He made his NFL debut on November 2, 2014, against the Cincinnati Bengals. Thompson was released by the Jaguars on November 11, 2014. He was signed to Jacksonville's practice squad on November 13, 2014. He was released by the Jaguars on September 4, 2015, and signed to the team's practice squad on September 6, 2015. He became a free agent after the 2017 season but was not re-signed.
