= Ranked (musical) =

American musical

- The Musical
- 2019 production artwork
- Music: David Taylor Gomes
- Lyrics: David Taylor Gomes
- Book: Kyle Holmes

Ranked is a musical written by David Taylor Gomes (music and lyrics) and Kyle Holmes (book), known as "Holmes & Gomes". The musical focuses on a dystopian world where academic competition defines each student's worth, and students do whatever it takes to get to the top of the leaderboards, including paying for their grades. Holmes & Gomes started writing in the spring of 2018, and Ranked debuted on April 4, 2019 at Granite Bay High School just weeks after the 2019 college admissions bribery scandal broke, launching the show into a national spotlight.

The musical is the subject of the 2022 HBO feature documentary My So-Called High School Rank, and is currently licensed by Uproar Theatrics.

== Background ==
Holmes & Gomes started writing Ranked for their students at Granite Bay High School in the spring of 2018. Holmes has been the director of theatre arts at Granite Bay High School since 2012, and Gomes is a local composer and musician who serves as the high school theatre program's musical director each spring. They stated the intent behind the musical was to shine a light on "a system that puts an insurmountable amount of pressure on our teenagers to be successful, and when we say success what we really mean is – better than everyone else [...] and for a lot of our students, that's not the reality of what living a happy and successful life is."

Holmes & Gomes looked at examples of people, especially adults, achieving academic success by any means necessary, such as the Atlanta Public Schools cheating scandal and the District of Columbia Public Schools graduation scandal. They also looked at unique ways of obtaining success in schools, like some Chinese schools using a "grade bank".

One of Holmes & Gomes's goals was to create a story that took student experiences seriously and did not present them as caricatures dealing with meaningless problems. Some of the musical's dialogue is taken directly from student experiences and writing.

Coincidentally, Rick Singer, the mastermind behind the 2019 college admission bribery scandal, worked with the Granite Bay High School community a decade prior to Ranked being written. Holmes did not arrive at Granite Bay High School until 2011.

== Productions ==
Granite Bay High School's production ran from April 4 until April 13, 2019. The performance was directed by book writer Kyle Holmes, and musically directed by composer David Taylor Gomes.

The Granite Bay High School cast held an encore concert-style performance on June 8, 2019 at the historic Crest Theater in Downtown Sacramento. The performance was directed by Joelle Robertson.

In August 2019, Ranked was further developed at the UC Davis Department of Theatre and Dance's third annual Ground and Field Theatre Festival. The production was directed and choreographed by Broadway veteran Mindy Cooper, and starred Chloe Boyan from the original Granite Bay High School cast, and Shelby Wulfert, from Disney Channel's Liv and Maddie.

A 29-hour industry reading of Ranked was scheduled to be presented in New York City on March 20, 2020 in an attempt to secure a lead producer for the project. The reading was to be managed by Daryl Roth Theatrical Management, and held at the Daryl Roth Theatre. The presentation was cast by Stephanie Klapper Casting, and auditions were filmed as part of the HBO project. On February 21, 2020, it was announced that the presentation would be filmed as part of an HBO documentary, that would later become "My So-Called High School Rank." On March 12, 2020 the Ranked social media announced that the reading would be postponed as a result of the coronavirus outbreak.

The show has been licensed by high schools and colleges around the world.

== Recordings ==
Ranked, A Musical Concept Album was released on February 28, 2020. The album was mixed and mastered by Andrew Heringer.

In November 2020, Joshua Dela Cruz and Amanda Dela Cruz released a cover of the song "Come Up For Air".

In January 2023, Broadway and TikTok performers Amber Ardolino, JJ Niemann, and Alex Wong released a cover of the song "Eye on the Prize".

== Cast ==
Casts for the original production, as well as the developmental workshop at UC Davis and the concept album.

Character	Granite Bay High School Spring 2019	UC Davis Fall 2019	Musical Concept Album Spring 2020
Lily	Natalie Collins	Chloe Boyan	Chloe Boyan
Alexis	Chloe Boyan	Shelby Wulfert	Shelby Wulfert
Sydney	Emma Harlow	Sophie Brubaker	Miranda Lawson
Ryan	Joe Reinero	Kyle Nagasawa	Chris Meissner
Jordan	Anvita Gattani	Katie Halls	Sidney Raey-Gonzales
John	Jack Dugoni	Nate Challis	Nate Challis
Francis	Trace Landrum	Sam Votrian	Jonnie Reinhart
Jacquie	Aleah Treiterer	Tiffany Nwogu	Sophie Brubaker
Carly	Taylor Harris	Raegan Price	Emma Harlow
