= Morgxn =

American musician

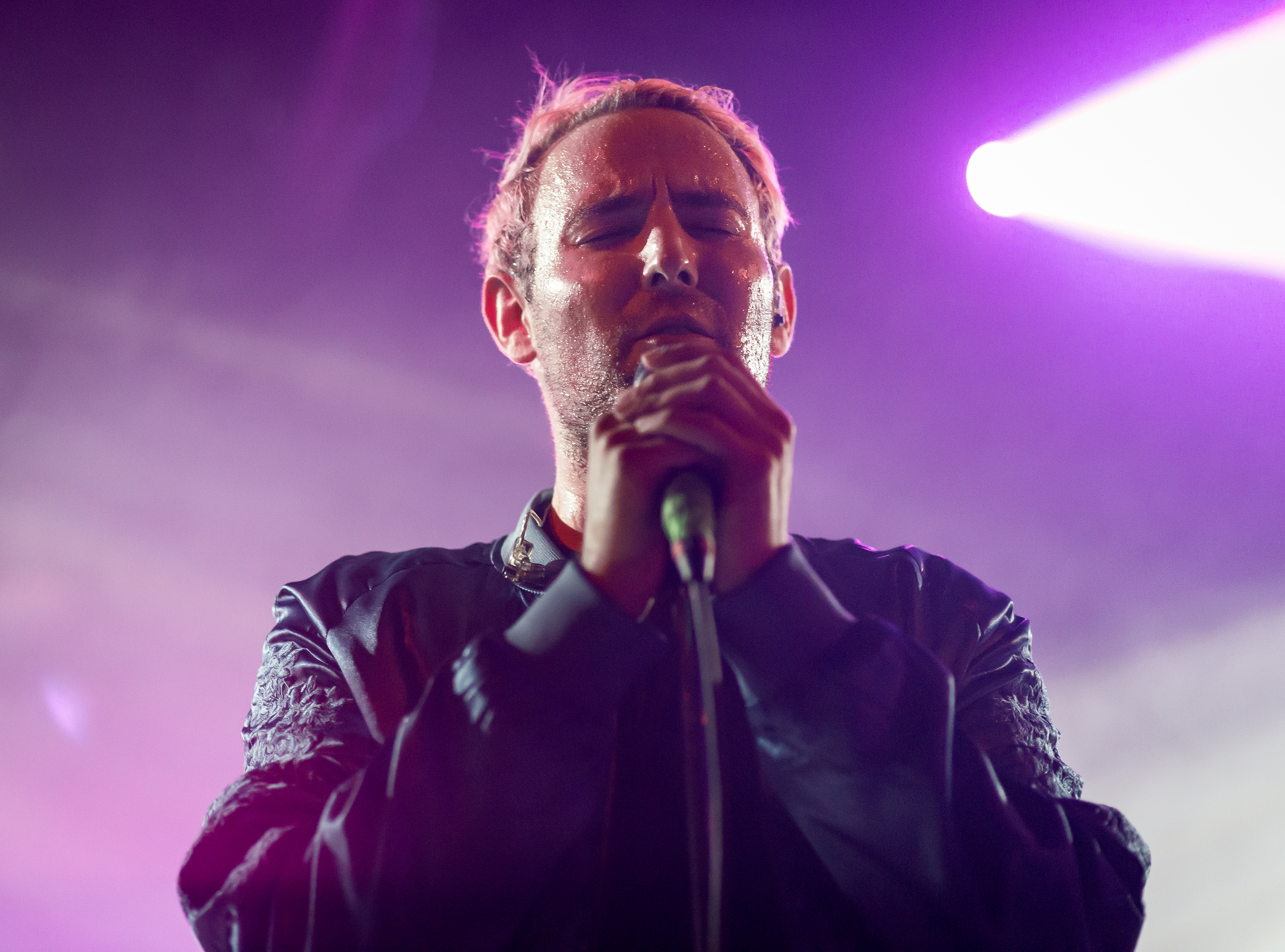
- Performing live at Echoplex in Los Angeles on November 14, 2017.

Background information
- Born: Morgan Isaac Karr; 1987; Nashville, Tennessee
- Genres: Indie pop, alternative R&B, electronic
- Occupation: Singer-songwriter
- Instruments: Vocals; piano
- Years active: 2016–present
- Label: Hollywood
- Website: morgxn.com

Morgan Isaac Karr, better known by his stage name Morgxn (pronounced Morgan), is an American indie pop singer-songwriter based in Los Angeles.

== Early life ==
Morgxn was born and raised in Nashville, Tennessee. After college, he moved to New York City to act in theater. He was an understudy in the original Broadway cast of Spring Awakening, before moving to Los Angeles to write and record his own music. Morgxn came out to himself as queer at 19.

== Career ==
Morgxn contributed vocals on two Tiësto tracks in 2015: "Fighting For" and "Change Your World". His debut single "Love You With the Lights On" was released in June 2016. He collaborated with Janelle Kroll on her 2017 single "Looose", and makes an appearance in the video. His 2018 single "Home" featuring Walk the Moon, a re-recording of his own song from 2016, peaked at No. 11 on the Billboard Alternative Songs chart, and No. 25 on the Billboard Rock Airplay chart.

His first album, Vital, was released on May 18, 2018. The song "alone/forever" features the indie electronic band The Naked and Famous, and the album's final track is a slowed-down cover version of The Cure's "Boys Don't Cry". Morgxn made his national television debut on January 8, 2019, on Jimmy Kimmel Live!, performing "Home" with Walk the Moon. He also performed "Me Without You" on the show. On January 25, 2019, he released vital : blue, an EP of pared-down versions of some of the songs from his album Vital, and a new song with Nicholas Petricca. On May 17, 2019, he released the single "A New Way". The music video premiered on the GLAAD website. On August 2, 2019, he released the single "OMM!" which stands for "Out of My Mind". On July 16, 2020, he released his first single "Wonder" as an independent artist. On August 10, 2021, Morgxn performed "Wonder" on Jimmy Kimmel Live! with Sara Bareilles.

== Tours ==
Morgxn opened for Skylar Grey in 2016, for Great Good Fine Ok and Phoebe Ryan in 2017, and for X Ambassadors and Dreamers in 2018 He played at Lollapalooza and Firefly Music Festival in 2018. In 2019 he toured with Robert DeLong, A R I Z O N A and performed at Bumbershoot.

== Personal life ==
Morgxn is non-binary, and uses they/he/xe pronouns.

== Discography ==
=== Albums ===
| Title | Album details |
|---|---|
| Vital | Released: May 18, 2018; Formats: CD, digital download; Label: wxnderlost/Hollywood |

=== EP ===
| Title | Album details |
|---|---|
| vital : blue | Released: January 25, 2019; Formats: Digital download; Label: wxnderlost |

=== Singles ===
| Title | Year | Peak chart positions | | Album |
| Title | Year | US Alt. | US Rock | Album |
|---|---|---|---|---|
| "Love You with the Lights On" | 2016 | — | — | Non-album singles |
| "Notorious" | 2016 | — | — | Non-album singles |
| "Home" | 2016 | — | — | Non-album singles |
| "xx" | 2017 | — | — | Non-album singles |
| "Hard Pill to Swallow" | 2017 | — | — | Non-album singles |
| "Carry the Weight" | 2018 | — | — | Vital |
| "Translucent" | 2018 | — | — | Vital |
| "Home" (featuring Walk the Moon) | 2018 | 11 | 25 | Non-album singles |
| "Holy Water" | 2019 | — | — | Non-album singles |
| "A New Way" | 2019 | — | — | Non-album singles |
| "OMM!" | 2019 | — | — | Non-album singles |
| "Wonder" | 2020 | 58 | — | Non-album singles |
"—" denotes a recording that did not chart or was not released in that territory.

=== Appearances ===
- "Fighting For" by Tiësto, on Club Life: Volume Four New York City (2015)
- "Change Your World" by Tiësto, on Club Life: Volume Four New York City (2015)
- "Looose" by Janelle Kroll, on Outsider (2017)
- "Somber" by Violet Days (2018)
- "Cross Your Mind" by Wingtip (2018)
- "Running up that Hill" cover by Meg Myers (2019)
- "Disco Kissing" by Vicetone (2025)
