= Chat Pile =

American rock band

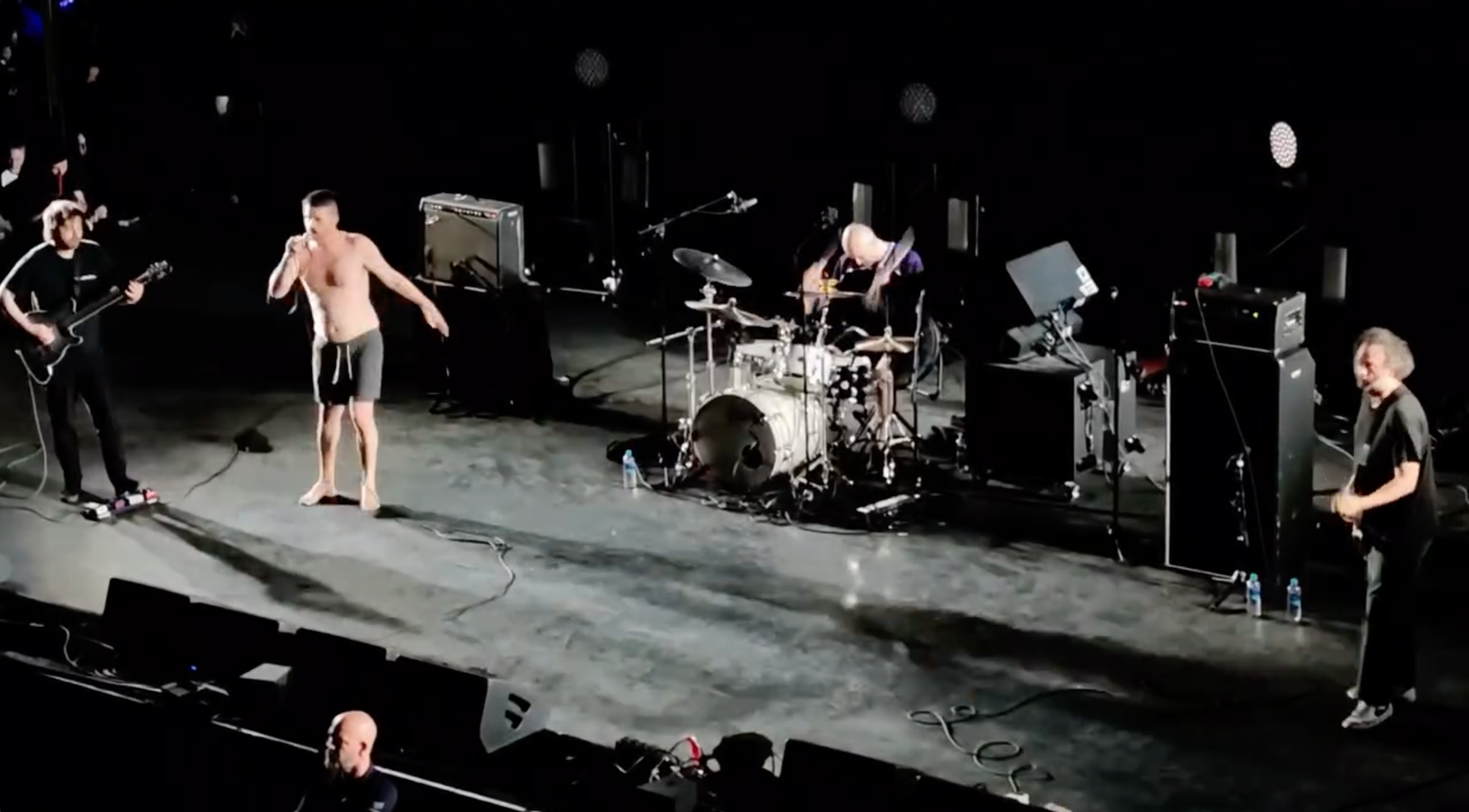
- Chat Pile performing at 2025 Roadburn Festival

Background information
- Origin: Oklahoma City, Oklahoma, U.S.
- Genres: Sludge metal; noise rock
- Years active: 2019–present
- Label: The Flenser
- Members: Raygun Busch; Luther Manhole; Stin; Cap'n Ron

Chat Pile is an American noise rock/sludge metal band from Oklahoma City, Oklahoma, formed in 2019. The band is composed of four members using the pseudonyms Raygun Busch (vocals), Luther Manhole (guitar), Stin (bass), and Cap'n Ron (drums).

Signed to The Flenser, their debut album God's Country was released in 2022, followed by Cool World in 2024. The band self-identifies as belonging to the noise rock subgenre, but external publications have labeled them as sludge metal.

== History ==
Chat Pile formed in February 2019 and took their name from piles of chat, byproducts of lead-zinc mining which are commonly found throughout Northeastern Oklahoma. The band was founded in Oklahoma City, but its members grew up in other parts of the state; Raygun Busch from Ponca City, Luther Manhole from Moore and the brothers Stin and Cap'n Ron from Asher. The members initially adopted stage names to avoid being identified by their employers at the time. Stin also acts as the band's manager.

Their debut EP This Dungeon Earth was released in May 2019. The band performed their first live concert in July 2019 at the venue 89th Street in Oklahoma City. When trying to promote their music, the band was originally rejected by Oklahoma City's music scene, which a band member claimed revolved around only hardcore punk and shoegaze. The band found successful promotion when This Dungeon Earth reached the top of Rate Your Music's weekly charts in a fluke of timing. Their second EP Remove Your Skin Please was released in November 2019, and the band released a compilation of both EPs on vinyl and cassette the following February.

San Francisco-based label The Flenser signed Chat Pile in September 2020 and released the band's debut single, "Roots Bloody Roots", a cover of the song by the Brazilian thrash metal band Sepultura, in July 2021. A year later, the band released their debut album, God's Country. The album received wide acclaim, receiving the "Best New Music" distinction on Pitchfork.

The band released the soundtrack to the film Tenkiller, which Busch stars in, in November 2022 as a Bandcamp exclusive. Brothers in Christ, a split EP with Kansas City band Nerver, was released in April 2023. Chat Pile's European tour debut came in April 2023 Roadburn Festival in Tilburg, Netherlands, first performing a secret set before playing the main stage the day after. Their main stage performance was released as a live album in April 2025, titled Live at Roadburn 2023.

Their second full-length album, Cool World, was released through The Flenser on October 11, 2024. The band was also named as headliners for the 2025 Roadburn Festival and also performed at Primavera Sound in Barcelona, which Stereogum praised as one of the top nine sets of the festival.

In July of 2025, the band announced the creation of their own boutique label Dungeon Earth. The announcement came with the release of Blood at Night and Blood at Night II, both tape-and-digital only releases featuring "a collection of noise, ambient, improv tracks from the Cool World recording sessions." A hundred copies of the tapes were made available on Bandcamp and quickly sold out, with the rest being sold on the Cool World tour.

On October 31, 2025, the band released In the Earth Again, a collaborative album with guitarist Hayden Pedigo. In a new move by the group, the record was released by two labels simultaneously: The Flenser and New York-based label Computer Students. On February 6, 2026, the band released the single "Masks" on Sub Pop, with a B-side covering Nirvana's "Sifting". In June 2026, the band released "Deep Blue" as the lead single to their album Who Loves the Sun. The album was released on September 4, 2026.

== Musical style and influences ==
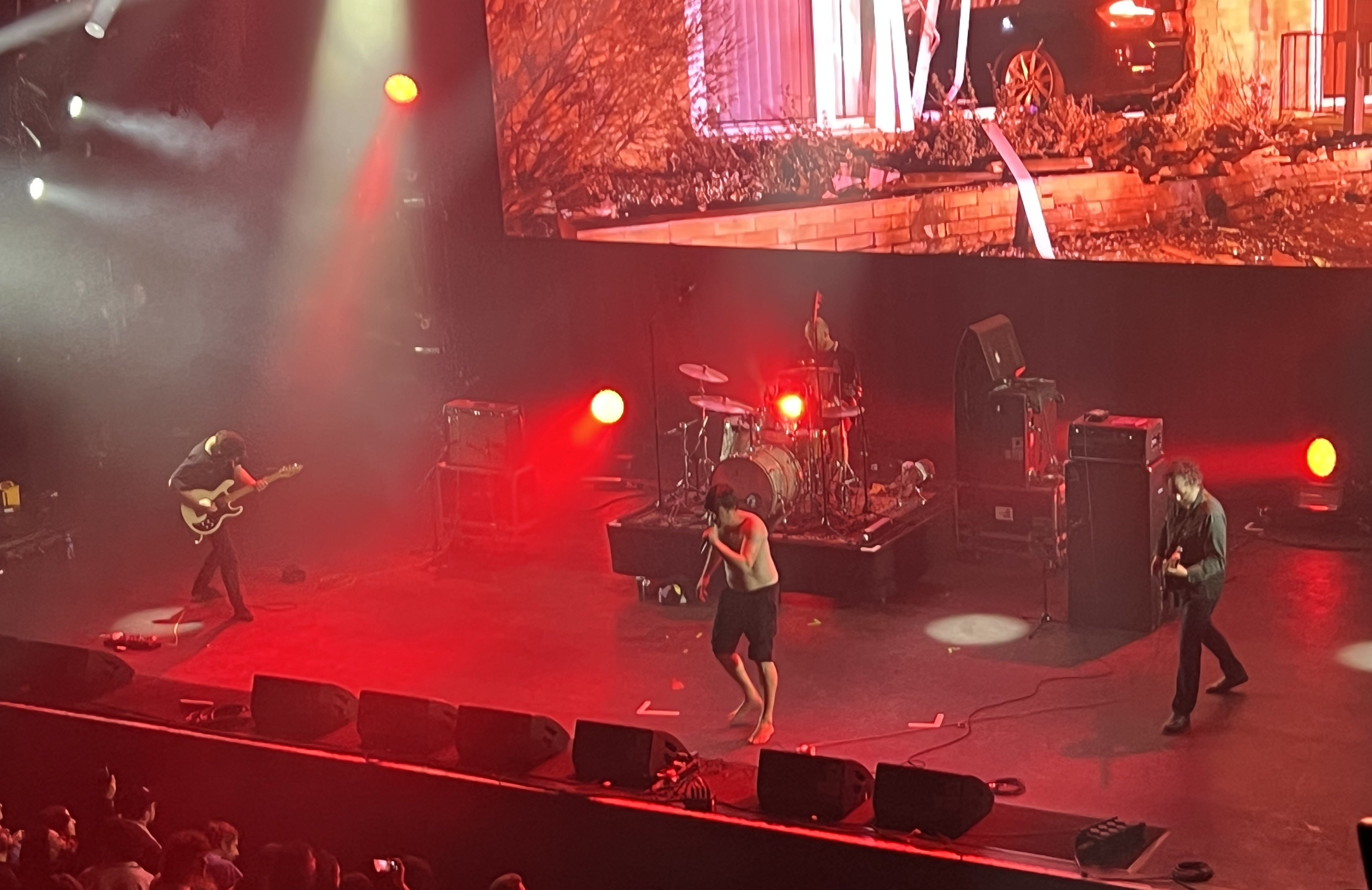
Chat Pile performing in 2023

In interviews, the band has described the themes of their music as "trying to capture the anxiety and fear of seeing the world fall apart," and "very consciously try to express and represent the feeling of living in the southern plains." They also take inspiration from other pieces of media including In a Glass Cage, Mysterious Skin, L'Humanité, Henry: Portrait of a Serial Killer, Continental Drift by Russell Banks, Woman at Point Zero by Nawal El Saadawi, and the 1980 album Chipmunk Punk.

The band describes their music as noise rock while acknowledging that audiences have also labeled them as sludge metal. Vocalist and songwriter Raygun Busch named Big Black as "probably our biggest influence." The Flenser describes Chat Pile as "[c]hanneling everything from the oppressive sludgy beat downs of Godflesh, the vulgar absurdity of The Jesus Lizard and the rebellious, post-modern experimentation of Sonic Youth".

According to guitarist Luther Manhole, the band's sound also contains elements of post-punk, nu metal and grunge. Bassist Stin also cites Korn as an influence with "no shame" but also admitted that "most nu-metal is completely unlistenable, especially anything made after 1999."

Busch's vocals are influenced by David Yow of the Jesus Lizard and Scratch Acid, Black Francis of Pixies and H.R. of Bad Brains.

== Band members ==
- Raygun Busch — vocals (2019–present), occasional rhythm guitar, keyboards (2023–present)
- Luther Manhole — lead guitar (2019–present), glockenspiel (2023–present), occasional keyboards (2023–present)
- Stin — bass (2019–present), tape loops, keyboards (2023–present)
- Cap'n Ron — drums (2019–present), occasional rhythm guitar, keyboards (2023–present)

== Discography ==
=== Studio albums ===
- God's Country (2022)
- Cool World (2024)
- In the Earth Again (with Hayden Pedigo) (2025)
- Who Loves the Sun (2026)

=== Extended plays ===
- This Dungeon Earth (2019)
- Remove Your Skin Please (2019)
- Portrayal of Guilt/Chat Pile Split (with Portrayal of Guilt) (2021)
- Tenkiller Motion Picture Soundtrack (2022)
- Brothers in Christ (with Nerver) (2023)
- Blood at Night (as "Chat Pile (+-)") (2025)
- Blood at Night II (as "Chat Pile (+-)") (2025)

=== Singles ===
- "Roots Bloody Roots" (Sepultura cover) (2021)
- "Slaughterhouse" (2022)
- "Why" (2022)
- "Wicked Puppet Dance" (2022)
- "Tenkiller/Lake Time (Mr. Rodan)" (2022)
- "Bulls on Parade" (Rage Against the Machine cover) (2023)
- "I Am Dog Now" (2024)
- "Masc" (2024)
- "Funny Man" (2024)
- "Scentless Apprentice" (Nirvana cover) (2024)
- "Radioactive Dreams" (with Hayden Pedigo) (2025)
- "Demon Time" (with Hayden Pedigo) (2025)
- "Masks/Sifting (Nirvana cover)" (2026)
- "Deep Blue" (2026)
- "PEN I S MALL" (2026)
- "Same Rules" (2026)

=== Live albums ===
- Chat Pile – Live at Roadburn 2023 (2025)

=== Compilations ===
- This Dungeon Earth / Remove Your Skin Please (2020)

=== Other ===
- grimace_smoking_weed.jpeg (Demo) (2021)

=== Music videos ===
Year	Title
2022	"Slaughterhouse"
2022	"Wicked Puppet Dance"
2022	"The Mask"
2023	"Tropical Beaches, Inc."
2023	"Crawlspace"
2023	"Dallas Beltway"
2023	"Cut"
2024	"I Am Dog Now"
2024	"Masc"
2024	"Funny Man"
2024	"Frownland"
2025	"Radioactive Dreams"
2025	"Demon Time"
2026	"Deep Blue"
2026	"PEN I S MALL"
2026	"Same Rules"
2026	"Shrine"
