= Union Mine High School =

Location
- 6530 Koki Ln; El Dorado, California 95623

Information
- Type: Public
- Established: August 16, 1999
- Principal: Paul Neville
- Staff: 47.81 (FTE)
- Enrollment: 1,066 (2022-23)
- Student to teacher ratio: 22.30
- Campus: Country
- Colors: Burgundy and navy
- Athletics conference: Sierra Valley Conference (Div IV)
- Nickname: Diamondbacks
- Website: umhs.eduhsd.k12.ca.us

Union Mine High School is a public high school located in El Dorado, California, United States. It is a member of the El Dorado Union High School District.

The school district purchased the property on which the school is located in 1971 for $65,000 to accommodate future growth, but did not need it for many years. Preliminary planning for the school began in 1991. After the defeat of a bond measure in 1993 to construct the new high school, a narrow vote to approve a bond in 1997 paved the way for construction to begin. The school's name was chosen in September 1998 during construction, and the school opened in 1999. The first graduating class was the class of 2002, but the first to go through all four years of high school at Union Mine was the class of 2003.

Union Mine's school colors are burgundy, navy, and white. Its mascot is the Diamondback Rattlesnake. Union Mine is known for its 4×4 schedule, and its dedication to the arts. The art program comprises art and three-dimensional design formats, dance classes, theater, and band. When it was first founded it was also known as "the technology school" due to its brand-new computer labs.

The football team clinched the SVC title three consecutive years. Varsity softball and varsity boys' basketball have also won league championships. In 2024, the boys’ basketball team hosted and won their first state tournament games, with a record 31–4 season. The boys' snowboarding team also claimed the state title in 2010 and in 2011, the girls' volleyball team won the Division 4 state championship. The boys' cross-country won the SVC title in 2007. The girls’ cross country won the SVC title in 2022 and 2023. The school has many typical clubs such as Christian club, Key Club, Robotics Club, National Honor Society, California Scholarship Federation, Rotary Interact Club, Drama Club, Environmental Club, Sandwich Club, and French Club, along with the now-defunct Philosophy Club and Nap Club.

As of 2023, the school has an enrollment of 1,066 students.

== Notable people ==
- Kyle Holmes, educator and playwright
- Annie Le, murder victim
