= Avid Dancer =

American rock musician

- Born: Jacob Dillian Summers
- Genres: Rock, alternative rock
- Years active: 2013–present
- Labels: Grand Jury, Hit City, USA

Avid Dancer (born Jacob Dillian Summers) is an American rock musician.

== Biography ==
Summers grew up in a fundamentalist Christian household. Prior to becoming a musician, he was a United States marine. He later started playing drumline drums.

Summers released his first song titled "Stop Playing With My Heart" in 2013. Summers released his debut EP titled I Want To See You Dance in September 2014. He is known for starting the songwriting process on percussions.

In April 2015, Summers released his debut full-length album, 1st Bath, via Grand Jury.

== Discography ==
Studio albums

- 1st Bath (2015, Grand Jury)
- Sharaya (2018, self released)

EPs

- I Want To See You Dance (2014, Grand Jury)

Singles

- You Only Like Me With The Lights Out
- I Feel It
- Feels
- Be With You
