= Chase McBride =

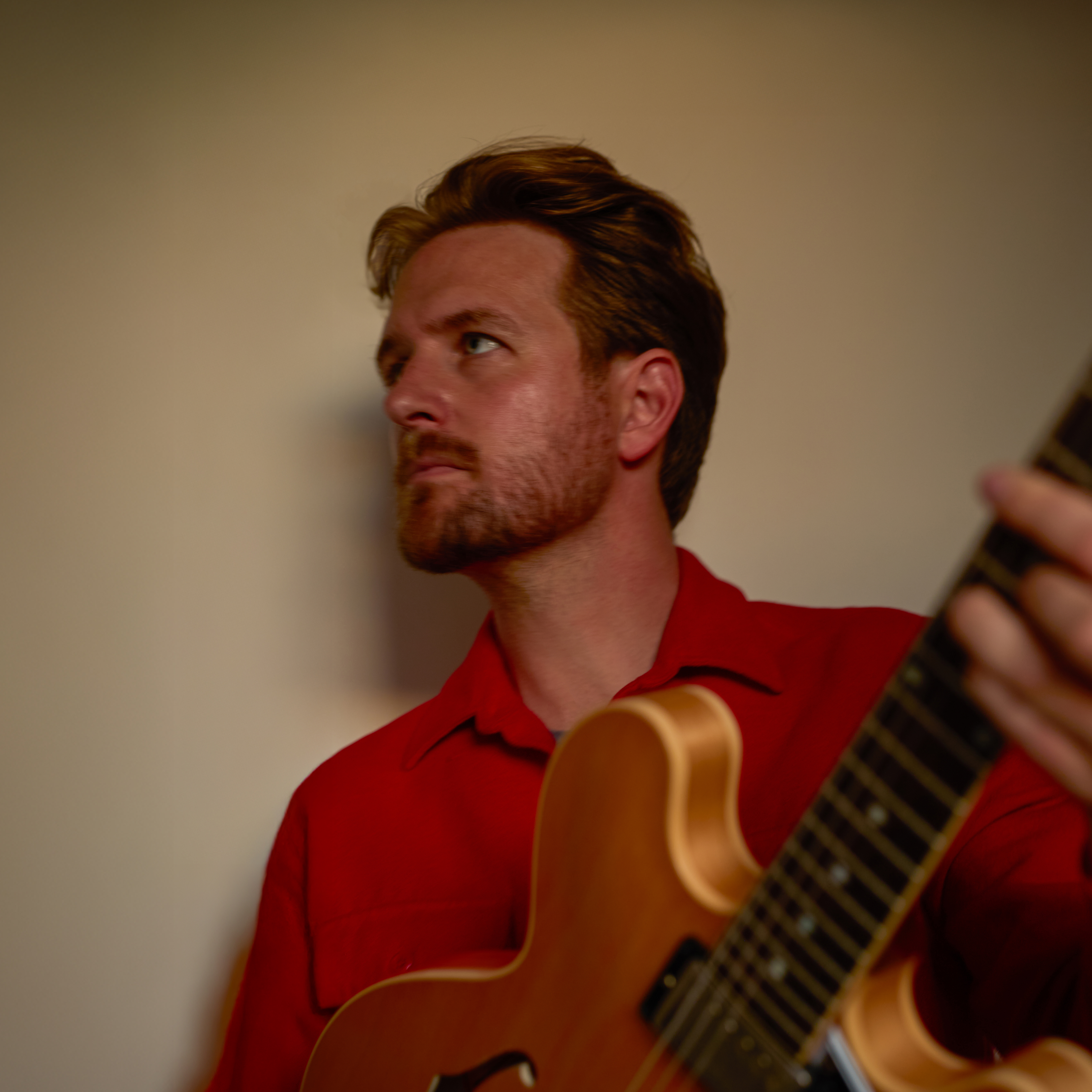
- Chase McBride photographed in 2026

Background information
- Born: Billings, Montana
- Genres: Folk, Singer-Songwriter
- Occupations: Musician, artist
- Instruments: Guitar; Vocals; Drums; Bass
- Years active: 2008–present
- Label: Independent

Chase McBride is an American songwriter and visual artist based in San Francisco. Born in Montana, McBride moved to California at the age of 18. His style has been described as "jangly hook-laden folk pop". He has released 5 solo albums, receiving recognition for both his music and visual arts.

== Career ==
In 2008, McBride left his hometown of Billings, Montana for San Luis Obispo, California, where he recorded his debut album of original music, From the Mountains to the Sea. The album was followed by a west coast tour and led to the production of a music video for the single "1937". This initial effort was met with positive reviews and won McBride an award for "Best Solo Artist" from the popular California publication New Times.

In 2010, McBride relocated to Ventura, California to work on material for a follow-up to his first album with surf-rock producer Todd Hannigan. After a year of studio work, he released two albums, a full-length record, The Good Fight and a five-song EP, Wild Child. McBride followed the releases with an extensive tour of the west coast.

Upon moving to Missoula, Montana in 2011, McBride began producing material for other bands and exploring new directions for his original material. His fourth solo album Every Road I Take, was independently released in 2013.

In 2017, McBride independently released his fifth studio album, Cold Water. The recording session took place in Bodega Bay, CA with San Francisco producer Mackenzie Bunch. A limited run of 250 vinyl records were produced and sold at an album release show in San Francisco. The lead single, "On The Other Side", was picked up by several major music blogs, and earned a feature on Spotify's "Weekly Buzz", "Viral 50 USA" (#8), and "Viral 50 Global" (#14) playlists. The success of the independent release earned McBride nods from some of his songwriting heroes. Impose Magazine stated the album had, "An eloquence and authenticity that gently fills a room".

After touring in support of Cold Water, McBride traveled to London, U.K. to begin work on a new album, Green Shade, projected to release in fall 2017.

== Discography ==
- From the Mountains to the Sea (2008, When It Hits Records)
- The Good Fight (2010, Sun Tribe Records)
- Wild Child (2010, Sun Tribe Records)
- Every Road I Take (2013, self-released)
- Cold Water (2017, self-released)
- Green Shade (2018)
- Pink Lemonade. October 1, 2018
