= Jon Bryant =

Canadian singer-songwriter

- Born: 22 January 1986 (age 40)
- Origin: Halifax, Nova Scotia, Canada
- Genres: Indie rock, folk rock
- Occupations: Singer-songwriter, musician, actor, voice actor
- Years active: 2009–present
- Label: Nettwerk

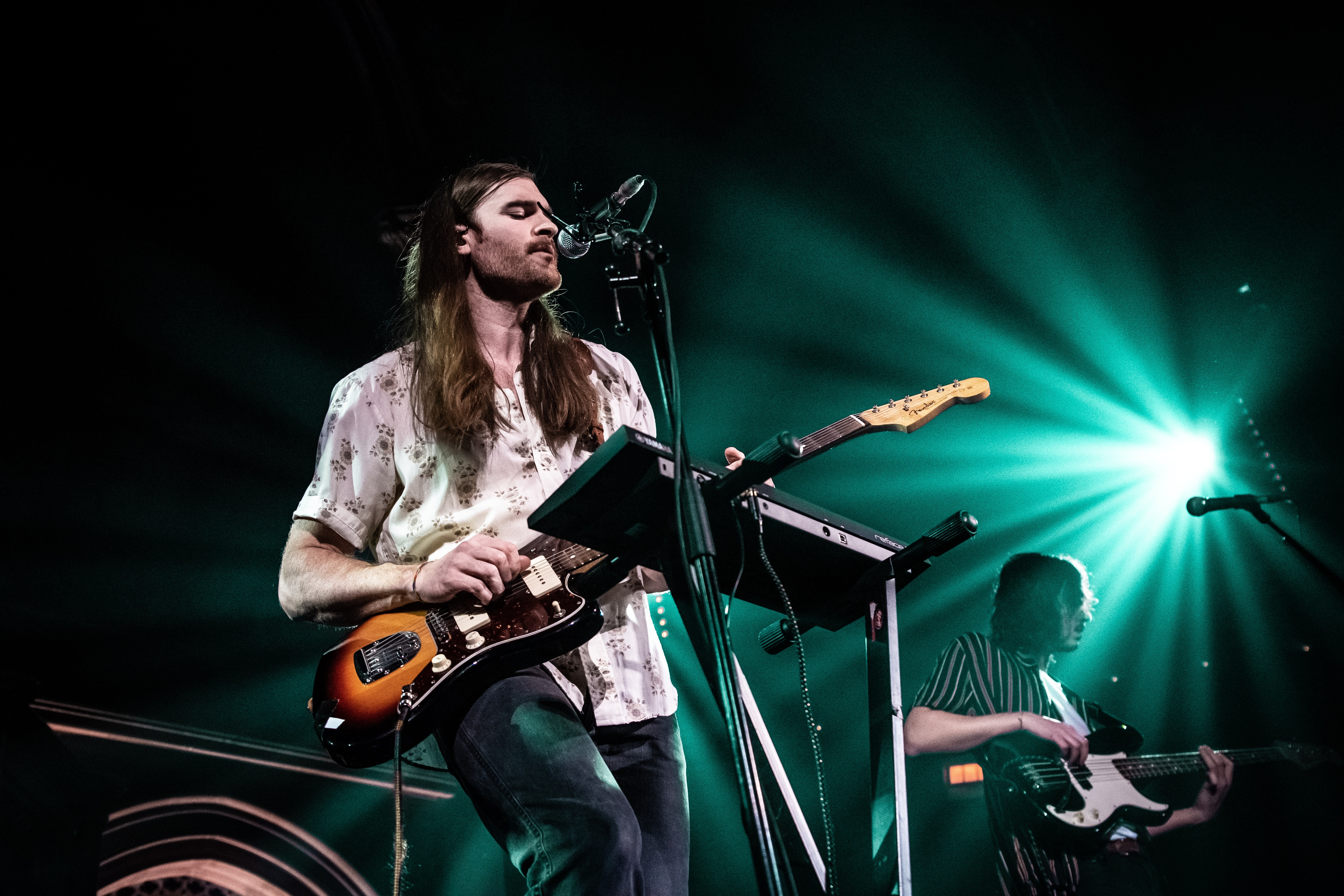
Jon Bryant Live at the Paradiso in Amsterdam 2019

Jon Bryant (born 22 January 1986) is a Canadian singer-songwriter. Native born to Halifax but now based in Vancouver, British Columbia, Bryant writes and sings indie folk music with a maritime influence.

== Bio ==
Bryant was born in Halifax, Nova Scotia. Growing up in Fall River, NS, he attended George P. Vanier Junior School and Lockview High School. Bryant graduated in 2004 from Caronport High School in Saskatchewan. He studied piano, and later learned to play guitar and drums. He attended Nova Scotia College of Art and Design and graduated with a Bachelor of Design in 2010.

He currently resides in Vancouver with his wife Bree (Woodill) Bryant, an actress and model from Halifax. They are expecting their first child September 2025.

== Career ==
Since 2009, Bryant has toured internationally through Canada, Europe and Australia. For many years he was an artist advocate for World Vision while performing with the Canadian Country band, Tim & the Glory Boys. In 2019, He played throughout Europe opening for American indie folk band Radical Face.

Bryant's debut album, Two Coasts for Comfort, released on 29 October 2009, was iTunes Canada's "Featured Singer/Songwriter Album of 2009" and garnered a 2011 East Coast Music Award nomination for "Folk Album of the Year".

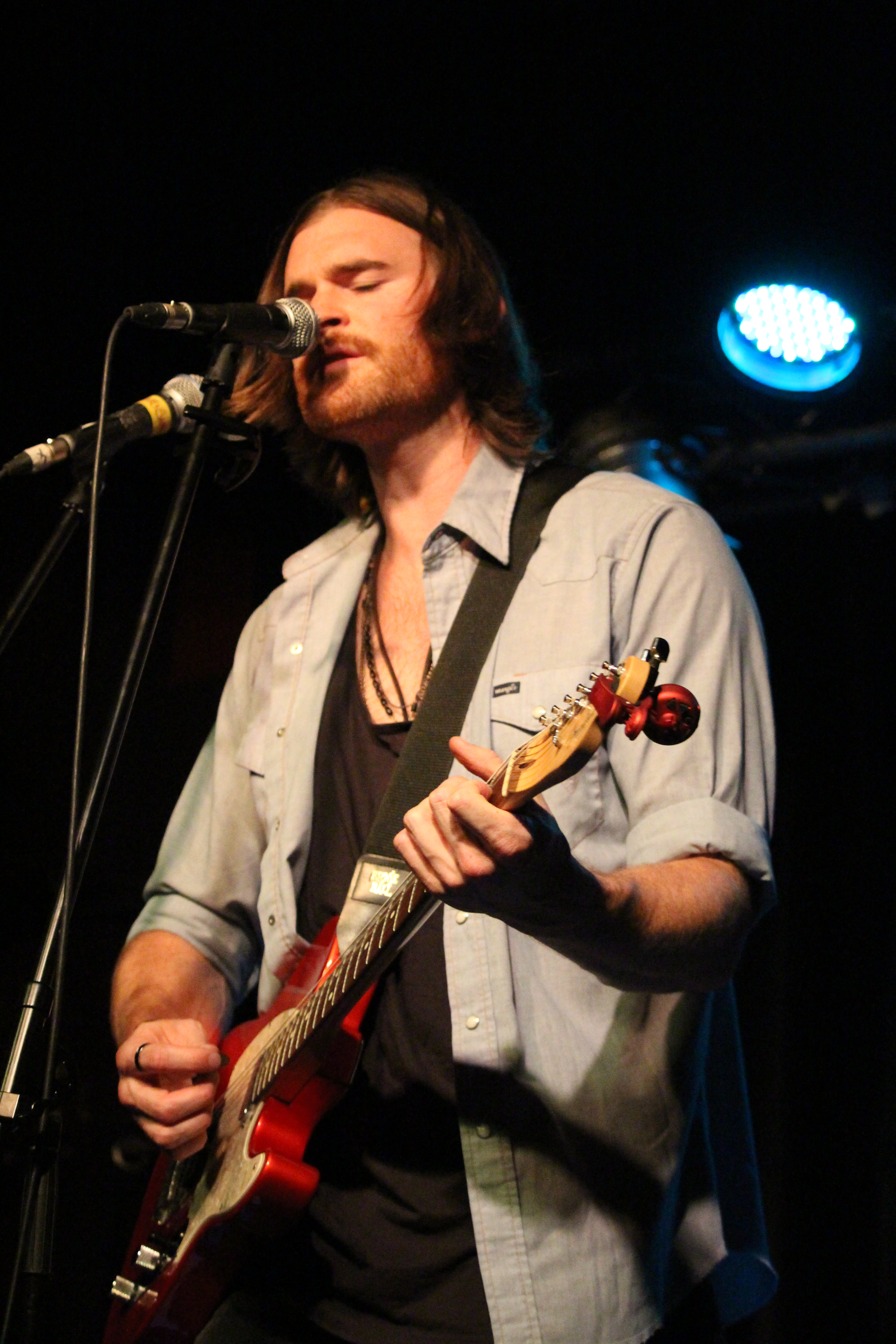
Jon Bryant Singer Songwriter

In May 2012, Bryant released his follow-up album, What Takes You, which featured a number of Canadian musicians, including JUNO Award winner Meaghan Smith, and guitarist Jason Mingo.

In March 2016, Bryant released his third studio album "Twenty Something" which featured the production of British music producer Alex Newport (City and Colour, Death Cab for Cutie), Canadian Producer Nygel Asselin (Half Moon Run), American producer Rick Parker (Lord Huron, Black Rebel Motorcycle Club) and Canadian Producer Jordan Wiberg. The lead off single to the album "Light" received critical acclaim and the official music video features the award-winning filmmaker, photographer & director Caitlin Cronenberg. In 2017, Jon Bryant signed an exclusive licensing deal with Nettwerk Music Group and, to this day, is still represented by them.

In May 2019 Bryant released his 4th studio album "Cult Classic" highlighting his short time within NXIVM, otherwise known as the "hollywood sex cult". The album was initially seen as a departure from his iconic indie-folk roots and features what could be described as a more psychedelic indie sound. Most notably from the album, his single "At Home" has garnered over 12,000,000 streams since its release and the music video won an American Society of Cinematographers award in 2024. "At Home" also was featured on an episode of the American police procedural show, "NCIS", during the attempted assassination of the character, Abby Sciuto and successful killing of MI6 Officer Duane Reeves.

Between 2020 and 2024 Bryant released a variety of Singles and EP's including his most successful song to date "Headphones" which has amassed over 16,000,000 streams on Spotify alone. Additionally, in 2019 Headphones broke into the top 50 when it charted on German AAA radio.

In April 2025, Bryant released his 5th studio album entitled Therapy Notes. The 12 song LP features the songwriting and vocals of Nashville-based singer-songwriter "Bre Kennedy" and Los Angeles based Lauren Luiz from the female fronted band "Girlhouse".

In 2009 and 2017, Bryant performed at the Juno Awards ceremonies. Additionally his albums have incited tastemaker praise courtesy of The Line of Best Fit, Atwood Magazine, CBC Q with Tom Power and Elle Canada.

In addition to his work in the music industry, Bryant is also an actor and voice actor. He has appeared in Apple TV's Smoke, Animal Control, Family Law, Fire Country, Searching for a Serial Killer: The Regina Smith Story, Big Sky, Arrow, Marvel: Sentinel of the Spaceways and Riverdale. In 2023 he voiced Bitores Mendez in the remake of the 2005 video game Resident Evil 4.

== Discography ==
=== Albums ===
- 2009: Two Coasts for Comfort
- 2012: What Takes You
- 2016: Twenty Something
- 2019: Cult Classic
- 2025: Therapy Notes
- 2026: Harbour

=== Singles and EPs ===
- 2020: Half Bad
- 2021: Back to Love
- 2021: Psychldyllic Salutations
- 2021: "The Great Reveal" (with Nina June)
- 2022: "California"
- 2022: "would you call me up?"
- 2022: "This Book"

== Awards and achievements ==
  - 2024 International Songwriting Competition winner
  - 2024 American Society of Cinematographers - Music Video Category - At Home (Winner)
- East Coast Music Awards
  - 2011 – Folk Album of the Year Two Coasts for Comfort (nomination)
- Music Nova Scotia Awards
  - 2010 – Best New Artist (nominated)
  - 2010 – Digital Artist of the Year (nominated)
  - 2010 – Inspirational Artist of the Year (nominated)
- Covenant Awards
  - 2010 – Best Folk Album Two Coasts For Comfort (nominated)
- iTunes Canada
  - "Deaf" – iTunes "Single of the Week" – January 2010
  - Two Coasts for Comfort – iTunes Featured Singer/Songwriter Album of 2009
  - iTunes "Indie Spotlight" – February 2010
- TV/Film Placements
  - "Headphones" – Shameless Season 11 "This is Chicago"
  - “I Shall Not Fear” - Manifest Season 4 “Relative Bearing”
  - "The Fall" – My Life With the Walter Boys Season 01 "The Cole Effect"
  - "At Home" – NCIS Season 15 "One Step Forward"
  - “I Shall Not Fear” - Sullivans Crossing Season 01 "Pressure Drop"
  - “I Don't Know How” - Murder in a Small Town Season 01 "A Chill Rain"
  - “Light” - Scream Season 3 "Endgame"
  - "David Livingstone" – Rookie Blue Season 4 "Skeletons"
  - "Evening Sun" – Rookie Blue Season 3 "Every Man"
  - "David Livingstone" – Degrassi: The Next Generation Season 12 "Waterfalls (1)"
