= Jens Kuross =

American singer-songwriter

- Born: April 21st Seattle, United States
- Origin: Boise, Idaho, United States
- Genres: Alternative
- Occupations: Musician, Composer, Producer
- Instruments: Piano, keyboards, vocals, drums
- Years active: 2015-present
- Labels: Aesop, Bigamo, Woodsist
- Website: http://www.jenskuross.com

Jens Kuross is a musician and singer-songwriter based in Idaho. In addition to his solo career he has recorded and toured with Palace, Hayden Pedigo, Curtis Stigers, The Acid, and RY X among others.

== Personal life ==
Jens was born in Seattle, Washington, but moved to Ketchum, Idaho with his family when he was six years old. Jens began his professional music career at the age of 15 when he began drumming for a jazz trio in the Duchin room (named after the wife of American pianist and bandleader Eddie Duchin). He continued to play this gig regularly until he moved, sharing the bandstand with and learning from the gig's bassist, Jeff Rew, a former session player from San Diego who had spent time on the road with both Elvis Presley and the Buddy Rich big band.

After graduating from Wood River High School, Jens moved to Boston to study at the Berklee College of Music, graduating with a degree in jazz drum set performance. He then moved to Los Angeles where he played in the local Jazz scene and worked as a session musician in a variety of genres and capacities. He earned a master's degree from Azusa Pacific University in Jazz Performance in 2013.

Jens moved back to Idaho in 2020.

== Career ==
In 2016, Jens Kuross released his self-titled debut EP via London-based record label Aesop. It gained favourable reviews from a number of high-profile blogs and publications, including The Line Of Best Fit and DIY Magazine.

In 2017, Kuross supported DJ/producer Bonobo (musician) on his European tour. Later that year Jens also wrote and recorded with minimal electronic artist The Acid on their debut album Liminal and his single "Spiraling" was featured in the closing credits of an episode of Lucifer (TV series).

In April 2018, Kuross released his new EP, 'Art! at the expense of mental health, Vol. 1', supporting the release with two Europe tours. One supporting Rhye and one supporting Mercury Prize-nominated Jazz trio GoGo Penguin. He also played his first London headline show at Servant Jazz Quarters, selling out the venue.

In October 2018, Kuross released the second installment of his 'Art! at the expense of mental health' project, 'Art! at the expense of mental health, Vol. 2'.

In April 2019, Jens Kuross released his single 'Give Me Your Ghost'.

Kuross released his debut album, The Man Nobody Can Touch, on 25 September 2020 but the Covid pandemic forced him to cancel all touring support and promotion for the release.

Kuross moved back to Idaho during the pandemic and after an album he wrote and recorded in his living room failed to find any label interest Jens was dropped by his management and booking agents. The album remains unreleased and he currently works as a cabinet maker.

In 2024 Jens released a collection of B-sides from the unreleased album on the Berlin based label Bigamo as an EP titled "Everything is Poisonous".

Alongside his solo endeavours, Kuross has forged a successful career as a studio and touring musician. He has performed and recorded drum, percussion and keyboard parts for numerous musicians and ensembles in a variety of genres.

== Discography ==
=== Albums ===
Title
Album details
Notes
Crooked Songs
- Released: 29 August 2025
- Label: Woodsist
- Format: Digital download

Track Listing
No.	Title	Length
1.	What I Miss Most of All	4:08
2.	No One's Hiding from the Sun	3:44
3.	Stereotype	4:35
4.	Beggar's Nation	5:07
5.	Hymn of Defeat	4:20
6.	Inside Joke	4:08
7.	Never One for Fighting	3:02
8.	Crooked Song	2:38

The Man Nobody Can Touch
- Released: 25 September 2020
- Label: Dirty Guns
- Format: Digital download

Track Listing
No.	Title	Length
1.	The Anchor	3:45
2.	Painkiller	4:15
3.	Golden Septembers	3:55
4.	Done With Dancing	4:51
5.	The Man Nobody Can Touch	2:50
6.	Happiness	4:34
7.	The Foxhole	2:54
8.	Unglued	3:41
9.	Someone Great	5:47
10.	Expectations	2:47

=== Extended plays ===
Title	Album details	Notes
Jens Kuross	Released: 17 November 2016; Label: Aesop; Format: Digital download	Track Listing: No. / Title / Length; 1. / Steadier / 3:55; 2. / Nobody's Problem / 4:31; 3. / Try To Follow / 5:48; 4. / Wilderness / 4:09
Art! at the expense of mental health, Vol. 1	Released: 13 April 2018; Label: Aesop; Format: Digital download	Track Listing: No. / Title / Length; 1. / I Only Ever Loved Your Ghost / 3:37; 2. / Forgive or Forget / 3:12; 3. / It Could Happen To You / 6:17; 4. / Everything Is Bought / 5:57
Art! at the expense of mental health, Vol. 2	Released: 26 October 2018; Label: Dirty Guns; Format: Digital download	Track Listing: No. / Title / Length; 1. / The Life Inside / 1:28; 2. / No Lights On / 4:38; 3. / Late Nights and Violence / 3:55; 4. / Everybody Wants to Rule the World / 3:44
Everything is Poisonous	Released: May 1 2024; Label: Bigamo; Format: Digital Download	Track Listing: No. / Title / Length; 1. / Cold Alaska / 3:37; 2. / Everything is Poisonous / 3:34; 3. / Savage Lullaby / 5:03; 4. / Solsbury Hill / 6:01

=== Singles ===
Year	Title	Notes
2024	"Everything is Poisonous"	
2023	"Cold Alaska"	
2020	"Painkiller"	
2020	"Done With Dancing"	
2019	"Yard Two Stone" (with Lane 8)	
2019	"The Anchor"	
2019	"Happiness"	
2019	"Coldness Kills"	
2019	"Give Me Your Ghost"	
2018	"The Life Inside"	
2018	"I Only Ever Loved Your Ghost"	
2017	"Only The Lonely"	
2017	"Spiraling"	
2016	"We Will Run"	
2016	"Eclipse Apollo"	
