= Chop Shop Records =

Record label

Chop Shop Records is a record label under partnership with Republic Records, headquartered in South Pasadena, California. The label was founded by Alexandra Patsavas, who also founded Chop Shop Music Supervision, which works with soundtracks on TV shows including Roswell, Boston Public, Grey's Anatomy, Gossip Girl, The O.C., and Chuck, as well as the Twilight series. John Rubeli, a former Atlantic Records vice president, is label manager.

The label works with indie rock bands that are often unsigned or signed with small labels.

== Current artists ==
- The Republic Tigers
- Scars on 45
- Mackintosh Braun
- Milo Greene
- Anya Marina

== Former artists ==
- Marina
- The Little Ones
- Odessa

== Soundtracks of the Twilight series ==
Alexandra Patsavas is the music supervisor and soundtrack producer for the films in the Twilight series: Twilight, New Moon, Eclipse, Breaking Dawn – Part 1 and Breaking Dawn - Part 2. All five soundtracks were released on Chop Shop.
