= Hayden Pedigo =

American avant-garde musician (born 1994)

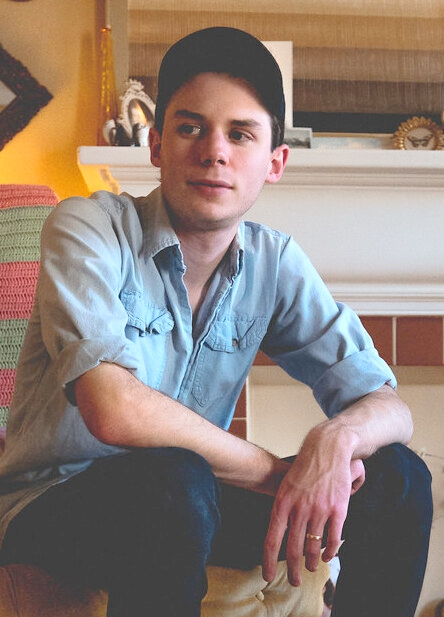
- Pedigo in 2017

Background information
- Born: March 26, 1994 (age 32); Amarillo, Texas, U.S.
- Genres: American primitive guitar, ambient, avant-garde
- Occupations: Musician, politician, performance artist
- Instrument: Guitar
- Labels: Marmara Records; Debacle Records; Driftless Recordings; Mexican Summer; Sub Pop
- Spouse: L'Hannah Pedigo

Hayden Pedigo (born March 26, 1994) is an American avant-garde musician, politician, performance artist, and model. Much of his work has been informed and inspired by his upbringing and residence in the Panhandle of Texas.

== Early life ==
Hayden Pedigo was born and raised in the West Texas city of Amarillo. At age 12, Pedigo decided he wanted to learn to play the guitar, and his parents paid for lessons. Pedigo grew obsessed with the instrument, carefully studying to play like Stevie Ray Vaughan and Ry Cooder. His influences would expand to include John Fahey, Robbie Basho, Daniel Bachman, and Mark Fosson, guitarists of the American Primitive Guitar style.

Pedigo soon moved on to studying European experimental rock acts such as Soft Machine and King Crimson, and jazz artists Miles Davis and Pharoah Sanders.

== Career ==
=== 2012-2015: Early albums ===
In 2012, Pedigo sent a video of himself playing guitar in an abandoned elementary school to the Austin label Maramara Records. The ensuing partnership would result in Pedigo’s first album, Seven Years Late, released in 2013.

For his second album, Five Steps, Pedigo used internet channels to approach various musical heroes for collaboration, including the German guitarist Steffen Basho-Junghaus and the English guitarist Nick Jonah Davis, as well as art rock influences like Charles Hayward (a founding member of This Heat) and Faust drummer Zappi Diermaier. Five Steps was released by the Seattle label Debacle Records in November 2014. In a feature article that same year, Texas Monthly said of the album: “Only twenty years old, [Pedigo] had revealed through sound the world he had grown up in and the sense of wonder he felt at being alive". Vogue magazine wrote of Five Steps: “Pedigo mixes his own unique playing style with disconcerting ambient tracks, creating a sound that comes off as entirely original".

In 2015, Pedigo curated a solo guitar compilation, Imaginational Anthem Vol.7, for Tompkins Square Records. For the project, Pedigo solicited contributions from several friends and influences, including Kyle Fosburgh, Mariano Rodriguez, and Sean Proper.

=== 2018-2021: Further releases ===
In 2018, Pedigo released Greetings From Amarillo under the Los Angeles-based label, Driftless Recordings. The album, said Pedigo, was “a tribute to the landscape of Amarillo, Texas, and the different spaces I've discovered here". At the time, NPR, on their All Songs Considered podcast said of the album’s title track: “Greetings From Amarillo blooms like a field of Texas bluebonnets swaying on the side of the highway. Over four minutes, the delicate and lilting melody dips in and out of major and minor keys, swirling sand into a dancing dust devil".

The following year, Pedigo released an LP, Valley of the Sun, on Driftless Recordings. The album release coincided with Pedigo’s (ultimately fruitless) run for a seat on the Amarillo City Council.

=== 2021-2025: Mexican Summer: The Motor Trilogy ===
In the spring of 2021, Pedigo announced that he had signed a three-album contract with the Brooklyn-based independent record label Mexican Summer. Pedigo would go on to refer to the three albums released via Mexican summer as The Motor Trilogy. The Motor Trilogy consists of: Letting Go, released on September 24, 2021, The Happiest Times I Ever Ignored, released on June 30, 2023, and I'll Be Waving as You Drive Away, released on June 6, 2025.

Between June and December 2025, Pedigo performed 61 shows as part of his tour across Europe and North America.

=== 2025-present: Collaboration with Chat Pile & Sub Pop ===
On October 31, 2025, Pedigo released a collaborative album with Oklahoma City-based noise rock band Chat Pile titled In the Earth Again.

In February 2026, Pedigo signed to Seattle-based record label, Sub Pop, and announced that he was working on a new album.

== Personal life ==
Pedigo married his girlfriend L’Hannah in 2015. They currently reside in Oklahoma City. On November 5th, 2025, Pedigo announced, via an Instagram post, that she was pregnant with their daughter.

On November 2, 2021, Pedigo made his runway debut in Gucci's 100th anniversary fashion show, Love Parade. He modelled their Spring/Summer 2022 collection alongside fellow musicians St. Vincent, Phoebe Bridgers, and Steve Lacy.

== City Council run ==
In the fall of 2018, at the age of 24, Hayden Pedigo drew national attention when he mounted a campaign to fill a city council seat in his hometown of Amarillo. In a profile on the young candidate, Rolling Stone noted: “If [the surrealist film director] David Lynch were in charge of a political campaign, it might look something like Pedigo’s.”

Pedigo's campaign began to gain steam when he launched his first campaign ad, an absurdist lo-fi video featuring the young candidate, dressed in a suit he’d purchased from Goodwill, hurling a metal folding chair around a public park. In the video, Pedigo propped his foot on the chair and declared, “I believe that a lot of local business owners are straight up getting bonked.” The video—and subsequent videos produced by the Pedigo campaign—drew thousands of views on social media, garnering attention from local news affiliates, and eventually from national media.

At first, the Pedigo campaign was seen by many locals as simply a prank. But, as the campaign wore on, it became clear that Pedigo was intent on winning. A documentary film crew, helmed by the documentarian Jasmine Stodel, arrived from Los Angeles to film the campaign—and the surrounding commotion.

In the meantime, Pedigo grew more serious about attaining victory in the race, researching policy and speaking with former city officials. Pedigo soon drew the attention of the Amarillo pro-development PAC “Amarillo Matters,” which, according to Rolling Stone, has been known to employ questionable tactics like sending out mailers with factually incorrect claims about candidates they oppose (a group which included Pedigo). As the campaign rolled on, Pedigo began to use his amplified voice to draw attention to what he saw as rampant cronyism and inequality in Amarillo.

Ultimately, Pedigo finished a distant second in the race behind incumbent Elaine Hayes. But the campaign was not an out-and-out failure, as Texas Monthly noted: “Just by running—and by doing it for the camera—[Pedigo] exposed Amarillo’s hidden-in-plain-sight corporatocracy.”

Kid Candidate, director Jasmine Stodel’s documentary on Pedigo’s city-council campaign, was released in 2021. The film, produced by Gunpowder & Sky, premiered as part of the virtual South by Southwest film festival.

== Discography ==
- Seven Years Late (2013)
- Five Steps (2014)
- Imaginational Anthem Vol.7 (curator) (2015)
- Do You Sing Vol. 1 (2015)
- Greetings from Amarillo (2017)
- Valley of the Sun (2019)
- Big Tex, Here We Come (with Andrew Weathers) (2021)
- Letting Go (2021)
- The Happiest Times I Ever Ignored (2023)
- Live in Amarillo, Texas (2024)
- I'll Be Waving as You Drive Away (2025)
- In the Earth Again (with Chat Pile) (2025)
