= God's Country (album) =

Studio album by Chat Pile
- Released: July 29, 2022
- Genres: Noise rock; sludge metal
- Length: 40:21
- Label: The Flenser
- Producer: Jared Stimpfl

Chat Pile chronology
Remove Your Skin Please (2019)	God's Country (2022)	Brothers In Christ (2023)

Singles from God's Country
- 1. "Slaughterhouse" Released: May 24, 2022; 2. "Why" Released: June 22, 2022; 3. "Wicked Puppet Dance" Released: July 21, 2022

God's Country is the debut studio album by American rock band Chat Pile, released on July 29, 2022, through the Flenser. It received universal critical acclaim, including the "Best New Music" honor from Pitchfork, and earned honors on several publications' year-end lists.

== Background and themes ==
Following the release of two EPs in 2019 and a cover of Sepultura's "Roots Bloody Roots" for a compilation by the band's record label, Chat Pile announced their debut album God's Country on May 24, 2022, alongside its lead single "Slaughterhouse". Subsequent singles "Why" and "Wicked Puppet Dance" were also released prior to the album. The band performed a show in its hometown of Oklahoma City on the day of the album's release and also immediately sold out two October dates in New York City.

The album cover is a photograph of the Oklahoma County Detention Center, where eleven people died in 2022 before the album's release. Bassist Stin said, "That punitive, authoritarian hand is always right over you at any given time."

God's Country is centered around real-world themes of horror. "Slaughterhouse" describes a 2014 beheading that occurred at a local food processing plant, while "The Mask" is about a 1974 mass murder of six restaurant employees in Oklahoma City. Vocalist and songwriter Raygun Busch described "Why", a song about homelessness, as "the scariest song on the record" and "Pamela" as "extremely personal in a lot of ways despite essentially being Friday the 13th fanfiction." "Wicked Puppet Dance" touches on drug addiction. "Tropical Beaches Inc." is about the life and death of infomercial pitchman Don Lapre. Closing track "grimace_smoking_weed.jpg" took its title from a list of options for one of the band's earlier EPs. It was released as a six-minute long demo in 2021 but was transformed into a nine-minute song for the album, and Busch's lyrics were inspired by the films In a Glass Cage and Mysterious Skin.

Busch also cited Nick Cave and the Bad Seeds' 1996 album Murder Ballads as an influence on his storytelling and characters.

The album was originally titled Execute God, but the band changed it due to similarities with Portrayal of Guilt's 2021 album Christfucker.

== Recording ==
God's Country was recorded independently by the band members. This process allowed the band to save money and put forth its own vision for the album. Busch compared it to the film Tangerine, which was shot on an iPhone, and Have a Nice Life's debut album Deathconsciousness, which was recorded on GarageBand, as examples of art made by the masses using computer technology.

Drummer Cap'n Ron uses an electronic drum kit containing samples that are further manipulated to produce an industrial sound. Stin's bass sounds are created using a Rusty Box pedal and a cab microphone. During the songwriting process, Chat Pile's instrumentalists are responsible for writing riffs, which are further jammed upon for Busch to lay his lyrics over.

== Reception ==
Professional ratings
Aggregate scores
Source	Rating
Metacritic	84/100
Review scores
Source	Rating
Beats Per Minute	84%
The Line of Best Fit	8/10
Metal Injection	9/10
New Noise	4.5/5 stars
OndaRock	7.5/10
Our Culture Mag	4/5 stars
Paste	8.0/10
Pitchfork	8.4/10
Sputnikmusic	4.3/5

God's Country received critical acclaim upon its release. At Metacritic, which assigns a normalized rating out of 100 to reviews from mainstream critics, the album holds an overall rating of 84, based on six reviews, indicating "universal acclaim".

Pitchfork awarded God's Country with its Best New Music distinction.

Touché Amoré lead singer Jeremy Bolm named the album his favorite of 2022, and Uniform guitarist Ben Greenberg also listed it as one of his 2022 favorites.

=== Accolades ===
Year-end lists for God's Country
Publication	Accolade	Position	Ref.
Bandcamp	The Best Albums of 2022	—	
BrooklynVegan	BrooklynVegan's Top 50 Albums of 2022	37	
Exclaim!	Exclaim!'s 50 Best Albums of 2022	13	
Paper	PAPER's Favorite Albums of 2022	—	
Paste	The 50 Best Albums of 2022	30	
Pitchfork	The 50 Best Albums of 2022	39	
Rolling Stone	The 15 Best Metal Albums of 2022	5	
Sputnikmusic	Staff's Top 50 Albums of 2022	7	
Stereogum	The 50 Best Albums of 2022	30	
Uproxx	The 2022 Uproxx Music Critics Poll	45	

== Track listing ==
All music is composed by Chat Pile.

God's Country track listing
No.	Title	Length
1.	"Slaughterhouse"	4:12
2.	"Why"	3:31
3.	"Pamela"	4:57
4.	"Wicked Puppet Dance"	3:07
5.	"Anywhere"	5:47
6.	"Tropical Beaches, Inc."	3:46
7.	"The Mask"	2:57
8.	"I Don't Care If I Burn"	2:54
9.	"grimace_smoking_weed.jpeg"	9:05
Total length:		40:21

== Personnel ==
- Raygun Busch — vocals, recording, mixing
- Luther Manhole — guitar, recording, mixing
- Stin — bass, recording, mixing
- Cap'n Ron — drums, recording, mixing
- Jared Stimpfl — mastering
