= Drowse =

American musician and producer

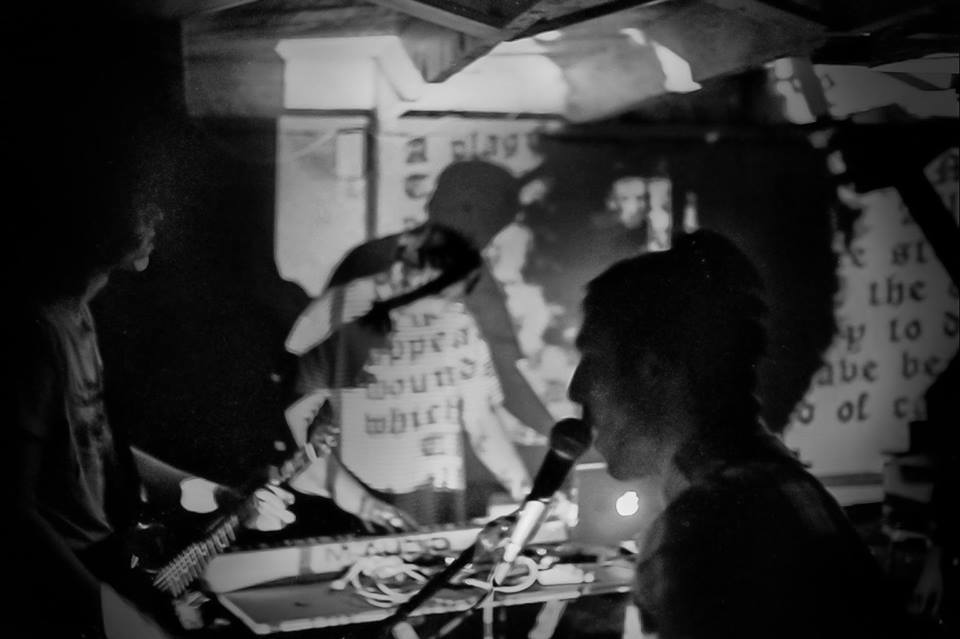
- Drowse performing live in 2014

Background information
- Origin: Portland, Oregon, United States
- Genres: Experimental, slowcore, shoegaze, indie rock folk, drone, ambient, electronic, lo-fi, noise pop, post-punk, black metal
- Years active: 2013 - Present
- Labels: The Flenser, The Native Sound, Apneic Void, Television Records, Glowing Window Recordings, Whited Sepulchre Records
- Members: Kyle Bates
- Website: https://www.kylebates.net/

Drowse is the musical project of American musician and producer Kyle Bates. Based in Portland, Oregon, Bates founded the project in 2013 and released the debut album, Soon Asleep, in 2015.

Bates collaborates with other musicians during his home recordings and live shows and creates interrelated audiovisual and installation artwork and writings under his own name.

== History ==
Before forming Drowse, Bates played in local bands and recorded music on his laptop. In 2011 Bates experienced a dissociative mental breakdown that would inform the first few Drowse releases. In 2013 he released an EP, Songs to Sleep On through Television Records and began performing live with help from various Portland musicians.

Drowse released its debut album Soon Asleep through Apneic Void Sounds in 2015. Following the release of Soon Asleep, Drowse recorded music that was contributed to Miserable's 2016 album, Uncontrollable.

In 2016 Drowse released an EP titled Memory Bed through New York based label The Native Sound.

Drowse signed to The Flenser to release sophomore album Cold Air in 2018. Directly after the release Bates became an artist in residence in Skagaströnd, Iceland, resulting in new work including Fog Storm pts. 1-4, released as a split with Planning For Burial.

Light Mirror, Drowse's second album for The Flenser, was released in 2019–it features material recorded in Iceland and at home. Later that year Drowse released the mini-LP, Second Self, in collaboration with Lane Shi Otayonii (Elizabeth Colour Wheel, Otay:onii) as an exclusive work for The Flenser's label subscription series. Drowse's final release of 2019 was a split with Amulets put out by Whited Sepulchre Records, it featured sounds recorded at the same time as material for Light Mirror.

In 2020 Drowse contributed the acousmatic piece "Screen (Hyperreal)" to the multimedia collection Medicine for a Nightmare: Part One. Bates then composed and recorded a new audiovisual work, Failing Memory Theatre (Prologue), which features repurposed sounds sourced from throughout the Drowse's discography as well as versions of forthcoming material for an upcoming, as-yet-untitled, full length–Failing Memory Theatre (Prologue) was created for and premiered at Roadburn Redux in 2021. In July 2021 the project released Room Impression as part of Glowing Window Recordings' Cold Fronts, a cohesive album length collection of works by Drowse, Planning for Burial, Jonathan Tuite (The Flenser), and Bryan Manning (Bosse-de-Nage).

Wane into It, the project's third proper full length for The Flenser, was self-recorded in Oakland, Portland, and LA from 2019 to 2022. It was released on November 11, 2022.

In 2025 Ash Souvenir, a collaborative LP between Drowse and Pacific Northwest based Black Metal duo Ragana, was released by The Flenser.

Drowse has shared the stage with a wide range of musical acts, including Planning for Burial and King Woman.

== Musical style ==
Pitchfork summed up the project's sound as "blending slowcore, ambient, and folk with lo-fi musings on memory and entropy, [part of] a grand tradition of Pacific Northwestern gloom." Drowse derives influence from multiple genres and has been also been labeled "drone-pop", "shoegaze/drone", and "dream pop." Vice described the project's sound as "the aural equivalent of blood rushing back to a sleeping limb" and likened it to a "post-black metal take on" English shoegazing band Slowdive and Texas post-rock band Explosions in the Sky. Spin writer Matt Malone noted that "Drowse prioritizes music over lyrics, using vocals not to tell a story as much as add an instrumental layer to the music's soothing fog." A.V. Club critic Brian Shultz characterized the project's sound as "breathy, entrancing, and certainly a little bit eerie." Cris Lankenau, writing for Willamette Week, compared Drowse to other Pacific Northwest musical acts Mount Eerie and Grouper. Lars Gotrich from NPR reinforced the comparison, saying "Drowse [...] sounds like an intimate Mount Eerie home recording overdubbed with a worn-out cassette of The Cure's Disintegration."

== Discography ==
=== Studio albums ===
- Soon Asleep (2015; Apneic Void Sounds)
- Cold Air (2018; The Flenser)
- Light Mirror (2019; The Flenser)
- Wane into It (2022; The Flenser)
- Ash Souvenir by Ragana & Drowse (2025; The Flenser)

=== Mini-LPs, EPs, split releases, compilations, commissions ===
- Songs to Sleep On EP (2013; Television Records)
- Memory Bed EP (2016; The Native Sound)
- Fog Storm pts. 1-4 Split w/ Planning for Burial (2018; Glowing Window Recordings)
- Second Self Mini-LP (2019; The Flenser)
- Drowse / Amulets Split w/ Amulets (2019; Whited Sepulchre Records)
- "Screen (Hyperreal)" Acousmatic Piece (2020; commissioned for Medicine for a Nightmare: Part One)
- Failing Memory Theatre (Prologue) Audiovisual Work (2021; commissioned for Roadburn Redux)
- Cold Fronts LP/Collection w/ Planning for Burial, Bryan Manning (Bosse-de-Nage), Jonathan Tuite (The Flenser) (2021; Glowing Window Recordings)
- Send the Pain Below (2021; covers compilation released by The Flenser)
- Your Voice is Not Enough (2024; covers compilation released by The Flenser)

=== Other releases ===
- Naive Sleep (2014; self-released)
- Covered (2015; self-released)

=== As Kyle Bates ===
- A Matinee by Lula Asplund and Kyle Bates (2023; Whited Sepulchre Records)

=== Videos ===
- "Melt" (2015; dir. Ayers)
- "Break" (2016; dir. Bates, Stoner)
- "Memory" (2016; dir. Bates, Stoner)
- "Klonopin" (2018; dir. Bates, Stoner)
- "Bipolar 1" (2019; dir. Bates)
- "Failing Memory Theatre (Prologue)" (2021; dir. Bates)
- "Untrue in Headphones" (2022; dir. Bates)
- "Ash Souvenir [Full Album Stream] Video Art" (2025; dir. Bates)
