= Dream Diary =

A dream diary is a diary in which dream experiences are recorded.

Dream Diary may also refer to:

- Yume Nikki (Dream Diary), a 2004 video game
  - Yume Nikki: Dream Diary, the game's 2018 reboot
- Dream Diary (album), a 2011 studio album
