= Kristina Esfandiari =

American singer–songwriter (born 1988)

- Esfandiari performing in 2017

Background information
- Also known as: Kris Esfandiari, Dalmatian, Miserable, MountShout, NGHTCRWLR
- Born: March 4, 1988 (age 38); Sacramento, California, U.S.
- Origin: United States
- Genres: Shoegaze, doom metal, R&B, hip hop, experimental noise
- Occupations: Singer, musician, producer
- Instruments: Vocals, guitar
- Years active: 2009–present
- Labels: Relapse, The Native Sound, Sargent House, The Flenser, Dero Arcade, Genie Mob
- Member of: King Woman, Sugar High
- Formerly of: Whirr

Kristina Esfandiari (born 4 March 1988) is an American singer-songwriter and music producer. She writes music and performs under the monikers Dalmatian, Miserable, and NGHTCRWLR, and with the bands King Woman and Sugar High.

== Early life ==
Kristina Esfandiari was born to immigrant parents, an Iranian father and a Serbian mother. They raised her in a Charismatic Christian church. She was raised in Sacramento, California. At age 22, she moved to the San Francisco Bay Area.

== Career ==
Esfandiari began her musical career as a vocalist for shoegaze band Whirr from 2012 to 2013 and was featured on the EP Around, before moving onto her own projects.

In her early years as a performer, Esfandiari became well known for her heavy and dramatic vocals during live shows. As of June 2021, Esfandiari releases music under a multitude of personas: Miserable, KRIS, Dalmatian, Sugar High, and NGHTCRWLR.

Esfandiari is best known as the lead vocalist for the band King Woman. Esfandiari began King Woman as a solo project in 2009. The project later became a band, after she was joined by her childhood friend, Joey Raygoza.

=== Dalmatian ===
Esfandiari debuted her Dalmatian persona via her social media channels. Dalmatian is a rap project, inspired by artists including Elkk and JRAL. Dalmatian's first release was single "Pain Thresold", followed by "Friday the 13th", released October 2020. Speaking to Revolver in October 2020, Esfandiari said that she was working on Dalmatian's first album, featuring JRAL and Elkk.

=== King Woman ===
King Woman released their first successful EP, Doubt, with The Flenser in 2015. The EP was inspired by Esfandiari's experiences of trying to leave her religious upbringing.

King Woman signed to Relapse Records and released their debut LP, Created in the Image of Suffering, which was labelled by Pitchfork as one of the best rock albums of 2017. Writing for Beats Per Minute’s "Darkest Albums" feature, John Amen called the album "a disturbing journey through consternation, despair, and heretical inquiry." King Woman's second album, Celestial Blues, was announced in June 2021, as was its July 2021 oncoming release by Relapse Records. The first single from the album, "Morning Star", was released ahead of the LP. This was followed by a second single, "Psychic Wound", and a third single, "Boghz". The album was released to positive reviews.

=== Miserable ===
Miserable is a shoegaze project debuted by Esfandiari in 2014 with EPs Halloween Dream and Dog Days. Uncontrollable, Miserable's debut album, was released via The Native Sound in April 2016. Written and recorded over the course of a year, the LP is the most emotional release in Esfandiari's history as an artist. The album quickly became a fan favourite and her breakthrough record, according to most mainstream media. Pitchfork and Spin praised her work. She later toured extensively in the US.

=== NGHTCRWLR ===
NGHTCRWLR has been described as a "mixture of drone, harsh noise and industrial sounds". The first NGHTCRWLR record, Let the Children Scream, was released in 2020 by Amniote Editions. The second, O Z, was released in 2025 via YEAR 0001.

=== Sugar High ===
Sugar High is a collaboration with producer and singer-songwriter Darcy Baylis, who Esfandiari met over Instagram in 2018. The duo released their debut album, Love Addict, in 2020 on Dero Arcade. "Losing" and "Ugly" were released as singles from the album.

== Discography ==
=== Dalmatian ===
==== Singles / EPs ====
- Pain Threshold (2019)
- Friday the 13th (2020)

=== King Woman ===
==== Albums ====
- Created in the Image of Suffering (2017)
- Celestial Blues (2021)

==== Singles / EPs ====
- "Degrida / Sick Bed" (2013)
- "Dove / Fond Affections"" (2014)
- Doubt (EP, 2015)
- "I Wanna be Adored" (The Stone Roses cover) (2018)
- "Bury" (2024)

=== Miserable ===
==== Albums ====
- Uncontrollable (2016)

==== Singles / EPs ====
- Split with Grey Zine (2013)
- Halloween Dream (EP, 2014)
- Dog Days (EP, 2014)
- Loverboy (EP, 2018)

=== NGHTCRWLR ===
==== Albums ====
- Let the Children Scream (2020)
- O Z (2025)

=== Sugar High ===
==== Albums ====
- Love Addict (2020)

=== Whirr ===
==== Singles / EPs ====
- Around (EP, 2013)
