= The Flenser =

Experimental music record label

- Founded: 2009
- Genre: Avant-garde metal, experimental rock, extreme metal
- Country of origin: U.S.
- Location: San Francisco, California
- Official website: www.theflenser.com www.nowflensing.com

The Flenser (also known as Flenser Records) is an American record label founded by Jonathan Tuite in 2009 in San Francisco, California. It describes itself as a "dark music" label or a "dark experimental record label".

Bands that work with or have worked with The Flenser include Have a Nice Life, Deafheaven, Kayo Dot, Planning for Burial, Midwife, Chat Pile and Uboa.

== History ==
The Flenser was founded in 2009 by former musician Jonathan Tuite in San Francisco, who originally intended to focus the label on the American black metal scene at the time. However, the scene changed as The Flenser slowly gained prominence, so Tuite expanded the reach of the label to other genres. The label was named after the process of flensing – removing blubber from whales – which Tuite learned about from the novel Moby-Dick.

Among The Flenser's more critically successful releases was its reissue of Have a Nice Life's album Deathconsciousness (2008; reissued 2014). Originally self-released in 2008, this lo-fi double album gradually developed a cult following; Pitchfork characterized its worldview as one in which "existence is bleak, gallows humor undergirds it, and sometimes wallowing in that sick paradox is the best revenge." Over time, its audience expanded beyond niche internet circles; Kerrang! described it as "a viral hit amongst internet communities like /mu/, Sputnikmusic and Rate Your Music," calling it "the stuff of internet myth." The Flenser reissued the album in 2014, helping introduce it to a wider audience and later released the band's follow-up albums, The Unnatural World (2014) and Sea of Worry (2019).

In 2019, The Flenser began publishing literature, with their first full-length novel, To Sing of Damnation, being released in 2020.

In the 2020s, the label saw success with Chat Pile's God's Country (2022). The band's debut full-length album was a critical success, blending sludge metal, noise rock, and industrial influences. It was named Best New Music by Pitchfork and topped Stereogum's year-end metal list. That same year, the label release the compilation Send the Pain Below, a six-song EP featuring multiple bands on the label covering nu metal songs.

Its recent activities include Ragana's Desolation's Flower (2023), which appeared on multiple year-end lists, including those from Pitchfork and Rolling Stone, as well as the compilation Your Voice Is Not Enough (2024), a tribute album to the band Low. The project was initiated before the death of drummer Mimi Parker and was later dedicated to her memory. The compilation features artists including Midwife, Planning for Burial, and Have a Nice Life.

== Showcases and Events ==
Since 2019, The Flenser has organized and participated in several showcase events in New York and at festivals such as Oblivion Access and Roadburn Festival, featuring artists like Have a Nice Life, Midwife, and Chat Pile.

To mark its tenth anniversary, The Flenser was invited to curate a showcase at the 2020 edition of the Roadburn Festival in the Netherlands. The lineup was set to include performances by Have a Nice Life, Planning for Burial, and Giles Corey—whose set would have been the project's live debut—but the event was ultimately canceled due to the COVID-19 pandemic.

== Artists ==
=== Current ===
- Agriculture
- All Your Sisters
- Amulets
- Black Wing
- Bosse-de-Nage
- Botanist
- Chat Pile
- Consumer
- Cremation Lily
- Crippling Alcoholism
- Drowse
- Echo Beds
- Faetooth
- Genital Shame
- Hand Model
- Have a Nice Life
- Heinali and Matt Finney
- Hissing
- Kathryn Mohr
- Low Estate
- Mamaleek
- Midwife
- Planning for Burial
- Ragana
- Rhododendron
- RLYR
- Scarcity
- Succumb
- Sutekh Hexen
- The Flowers of St. Francis
- Trevor de Brauw
- Truck Violence
- Uboa
- Vale
- Vile Creature
- White Suns
- Wreck and Reference

=== Former ===
- Boduf Songs
- Deafheaven
- Elizabeth Colour Wheel
- Father Murphy
- Kayo Dot
- King Woman
- M. Trecka
- Muscle and Marrow
- Palace of Worms
- Panopticon
- Sannhet
- Sprain
- Street Sects
- Toby Driver

== Releases ==
=== Discography ===
This is a list of works from The Flenser Catalog. The list is ordered by production date.

- Palace of Worms – The Forgotten CD (FR01)
- Panopticon – Collapse DLP (FR02)
- Bosse-de-Nage – Bosse-de-Nage CD (FR03)
- Ghast – May the Curse Bind DLP (FR04)
- Palace of Worms – Lifting the Veil CS (FR05)
- Skagos / Panopticon – Split CD (FR06)
- Necrite – Sic Transit Gloria Mundi CD (FR07)
- Pale Chalice – Afflicting the Dichotomy of Trepid Creation CD (FR08)
- Circle of Eyes – Circle of Eyes CS (FR09)
- Seidr – For Winter Fire CD (FR10)
- Panopticon – On the Subject...of Mortality DLP (FR11)
- Bosse-de-Nage – Bosse-de-Nage (II) CD/LP (FR12)
- Wreck and Reference – Black Cassette LP (FR13)
- Panopticon – Social Disservices CD/DLP (FR14)
- Otesanek, Loss, Orthodox, Mournful Congregation – Fo(u)r Burials CD (FR15)
- Lake of Blood – As Time and Tide Erodes Stone LP (FR16)
- Lycus – Demo 2011 LP (FR17)
- Wheels Within Wheels / Merkaba – Split CS (FR18)
- Obolus – Lament LP (FR19)
- Coffinworm – Great Bringer of Night LP (FR20)
- Worm Ouroboros – Come the thaw DLP (FR21)
- Nick Millevoi – In White Sky CS (FR22)
- Wreck and Reference – No Youth LP (FR23)
- Bosse-de-Nage – Bosse-de-Nage (III) DLP (FR24)
- Palace of Worms / Mastery – Split CS (FR25)
- Deafheaven / Bosse-de-Nage – Split LP (FR26)
- Grayceon – Pearl and the End of Days LP (FR27)
- Botanist – Mandragora CD/LP (FR28)
- Trees – Sickness-In LP (FR29)
- Bell Witch – Longing DLP (FR30)
- Vestiges / Panopticon – Split LP (FR31)
- Skagos – Anarchic CD (FR32)
- Eight Bells – The Captains Daughter LP (FR33)
- Wreck and Reference – No Content 7-inch (FR34)
- Panopticon – Kentucky Reissue DLP (FR35)
- Loss of Self – Twelve Minutes CD/LP (FR36)
- Botanist / Palace of Worms – Split LP (FR37)
- Vaura – The Missing CD/LP (FR38)
- Have a Nice Life – The Unnatural World LP (FR39)
- White Suns – Totem CD/LP (FR40)
- Mamaleek – He Never Spoke a Mumblin' Word LP (FR41)
- Have a Nice Life – Deathconsciousness DLP (FR42)
- Mastery – Valis LP (FR43)
- Planning for Burial – Desideratum LP/CD (FR44)
- Wreck and Reference – Want CD/LP (FR45)
- Botanist – VI: Flora CD/LP (FR46)
- Coffinworm – IV.I.VIII LP (FR47)
- Kayo Dot – Coffins on Io CD/LP (FR49)
- Boduf Songs – Stench of Exist CD/LP (FR50)
- King Woman – Doubt EP/CS (FR51)
- Sannhet – Revisionist CD/LP (FR53)
- Father Murphy – Croce CD/LP/CS (FR54)
- Mamaleek – Via Dolorosa LP (FR55)
- Planning for Burial – Leaving LP (FR56)
- Bell Witch – Demo 2011 LP (FR57)
- Black Wing – ...Is Doomed (FR59)
- Bosse-de-Nage – All Fours LP (FR60)
- Heat Dust – Heat Dust LP (FR61)
- Giles Corey – Giles Corey LP (FR62)
- Sannhet – Known Flood LP (FR63)
- Kayo Dot – Hubardo CD/LP (FR64)
- Trevor De Bruauw – Uptown CD (FR65)
- Braveyoung – Misery & Pride CD/LP (FR66)
- Muscle and Marrow – Love LP (FR67)
- All Your Sisters – Uncomfortable Skin LP/CS (FR68)
- Kayo Dot – Plastic House on Base of Sky CD/LP (FR69)
- Wreck and Reference – Indifferent Rivers Romance End LP (FR70)
- Street Sects – End Position LP (FR71)
- Planning for Burial – Matawan – Collected Works 2010–2014 2CD (FR72)
- Toby Driver – Madonnawhore CD (FR73)
- Succumb – Succumb CD/LP (FR74)
- Planning for Burial – Below the House CD/LP (FR75)
- Heinali & Matt Finney – How We Lived LP (FR76)
- White Suns – Psychic Drift CD (FR77)
- Mamaleek – Out of Time 2LP (FR79)
- Drowse – Cold Air LP (FR80)
- Street Sects – Rat Jacket LP (FR84)
- Alis – The Unraveling CD/LP (FR85)
- RLYR – Actual Existence (FR86)
- Planning for Burial – Quietly CD/LP (FR87)
- Bosse-de-Nage – Further Still CD/LP (FR90)
- All Your Sisters – Trust Ruins CD/LP (FR93)
- Elizabeth Colour Wheel – Nocebo CD/LP (FR94)
- Drowse – Light Mirror LP (FR95)
- Vale – Burden of Sight CD (FR96)
- Wreck and Reference – Absolute Still Life CD/LP (FR98)
- Have a Nice Life – Sea of Worry CD/LP (FR100)
- CONSUMER – In Computers LP (FR102)
- Midwife – Forever LP (FR105)
- Planning for Burial – When Summer Turns to Fall LP (FR108)
- Giles Corey – Hinterkaifeck LP (FR109)
- The Flowers of St. Francies – Vol. 5 Tape (FR111)
- Midwife & Amulets – In / Heaven CS (FR112)
- Botanist – Photosynthesis LP (FR113)
- History – History LP (FR114)
- Midwife – Like Author, Like Daughter LP (FR115)
- Black Wing – No Moon LP (FR117)
- Amulets – Blooming LP (FR119)
- Midwife – Luminol LP (FR120)
- Hand Model – The Thinking Monster (FR121)
- Planning for Burial – Matwan Collected Works 2010–2014 Vol. 1 LP (FR122)
- Succumb – XXI LP (FR123)
- Various Artists – Send the Pain Below LP (FR124)
- Mamaleek – Kurdaitcha LP (FR126)
- Scarcity – Aveilut LP (FR127)
- Chat Pile – God's Country LP (FR129)
- Street Sects – Gentrification V EP (FR130)
- Cremation Lily – Dreams Drenched in Static LP (FR131)
- Mamaleek – Diner Coffee LP (FR132)
- Hand Model & Gloved Hands – Game Changers Tape (FR133)
- Kathryn Mohr – Holly Tape, Digital (FR134)
- Sister Grotto – Song for an Unborn Son LP (FR136)
- Planning for Burial – Matawan 2 LP, Digital (FR137)
- Nahvalr – Nahvalr LP, Digital (FR138)
- Drowse – Wane into It LP, Digital (FR140)
- Chat Pile – Tenkiller Motion Picture Soundtrack Digital (FR141)
- Chat Pile – Tenkiller / Lake Time (Mr. Rodan) Tape (FR142)
- Planning for Burial – Matawan Tape Collection Tape (FR143)
- Sprain – The Lamb as Effigy LP, Digital (FR144)
- Have a Nice Life – Voids LP, CD, Tape Digital (FR145)
- Midwife & Vyva – Orbweaving LP, Digital (FR146)
- Low Compilation – Your Voice Is Not Enough LP (FR147)
- Agriculture – Agriculture LP, CD, Tape, Digital (FR149)
- Ragana – Desolation's Flower LP, CD, Tape Digital (FR150)
- Chat Pile – This Dungeon Earth / Remove Your Skin Please LP, CD (FR151)
- Hand Model – Will Life Reign Supreme Even in Death 7-inch, Digital (FR152)
- Chat Pile – Bulls on Parade Felxi (FR154)
- Uboa – Impossible Light LP, Digital (FR156)
- Chat Pile – This Dungeon Earth LP, Digital (FR157)
- Chat Pile – Remove Your Skin Please LP, Digital (FR158)
- Scarcity – The Promise of Rain LP, Digital (FR159)
- Agriculture – Living Is Easy / Circle Chant LP (FR160)
- Mamaleek – Vida Blue LP, Digital (FR161)
- Midwife – No Depression in Heaven LP, Digital (FR162)
- Mamaleek – Those Who Pass Between Fleeting Words Digital (FR163)
- Chat Pile – Cool World LP, CD, Tape, Digital (FR164)
- Kathryn Mohr – Waiting Room LP, Digital (FR165)
- Midwife – "Signs" Digital Single (FR168)
- Have a Nice Life – Basic Flexi (FR169)
- Pyramids – Pythagorus LP, CD, Digital (FR171)
- Planning for Burial – It's Closeness, It's Easy LP, CD, Tape, Digital (FR172)
- Various Artists – Cold Fronts Vol. 2 LP, Digital (FR173)
- Chat Pile – Live at Roadburn 2023 LP, Digital (FR175)
- Dan Meyer – Kneeling Man Digital (FR176)

=== Literature ===
- "Blear" by Bryan Manning (TFB01)
- To Sing of Damnation by Adam Washington (TFB02)
- "Caryatid" by Bryan Manning (TFB04)
- "Overcasts: Selected Writings 2019–2023" by Kyle Bates (TFB05)

== See also ==
- List of record labels
- Experimental metal
