= Uboa =

Australian experimental musician

- Origin: Melbourne, Australia
- Genres: Noise; drone; dark ambient; doom metal
- Years active: 2010–present
- Label: The Flenser
- Members: Xandra Metcalfe

Uboa is the musical project of Australian drone, ambient and noise rock artist Xandra Metcalfe. She began in 2010, initially experimenting with doom metal textures and home studio equipment, before gradually moving towards noise, experimental and abstract compositions.

Metcalfe has collaborated as Uboa with several other noise artists including Slumber Kitty, Muddy Lawrence, Solus Varak, teeth dreams and has produced a split EP with Bolt Gun.

== Career ==
Xandra Metcalfe is based in Melbourne, Australia. Uboa's debut album Sometimes Light was released in 2010, followed by Jouissance in 2013 and The Sky May Be in 2018. In 2019, she released her fourth album The Origin of My Depression, which was recorded amidst her suicide attempt via drug overdose. The album cover was taken from her point of view in a hospital bed following the attempt, which in her words, "could have been the last thing I saw before I died. Nothing glorious, but something boring and accidental." She released an EP The Flesh of the World in 2020, which Toronto-based queer publication Xtra Magazine praised for its "punchy ’80s synths, layered vocals and absolutely massive blasts of raw noise."

In February 2023, Uboa signed to San Francisco-based record label The Flenser, which released The Origin of My Depression on vinyl for the first time. She opened for Liturgy on their first Australian tour in November 2023. Uboa performed three sets at the 2024 Roadburn Festival in Tilburg, Netherlands, including the live debut of The Origin of My Depression in full. Uboa's fifth album Impossible Light was released on 28 June 2024.

== Music ==
In a very positive review of The Origin of My Depression by the critic Anthony Fantano, her sound was described as a "cerebral dive" into Xandra's most negative and intense feelings of being a transgender woman...via "intense feelings of abandonment...expressed through intense soundscapes...and walls of distortion", culminating in a wide expanse of styles and soundscapes. Metcalfe has said of the album's sound, "I always associated sadness in music with sparseness, barrenness and quietness. I wanted to signify empty space musically. Hence why the harsh noise is few and far between, and I think a little more effective because of all the sparseness it contrasts with". Comparing the two albums, Metcalfe has said "Originally I was worried 'The Origin of My Depression' wasn't "Uboa" enough because of how restrained and sparse it is as a record."

She describes the writing process for My Depression as having "little conscious intentionality, it was mostly an intuitive process of writing. Nothing was planned out, and a lot of the songs were improvisations refined into compositions, usually after several attempts. "Detransitioning" took countless attempts to get right, whereas "An Angel of Great and Terrible Light" came out of nowhere."

Uboa named Jenny Hval, Planning for Burial, and producers Geoff Barrow & Ben Salisbury's collaborative score for the 2018 film Annihilation as influences for The Origin of My Depression.

== Etymology ==
The name "Uboa" is taken from a name given by fans to a secret character in the 2004 video game Yume Nikki. When asked about the influence of video games on her music, Uboa stated in an interview with New Noise Magazine that "the baseline drones in "Phthalates" and "Jawline" were inspired by Nine Inch Nails’ soundtrack to the original Quake", and that she "accidentally started making music by trying to write soundtracks for [video games]."

== Personal life ==
Uboa's music often reflects her struggles with her transgender identity, reflected in her music via the juxtaposition of emotional ambient music and harsh white noise. In an April 2019 interview she described the sources of her mental pain as including "mistaken identity, failed relationships and inability to love, joblessness, boredom, structurelessness, psychosis...[and] anxiety." Shortly after the release of The Origin of My Depression, Metcalfe was diagnosed with autism and ADHD. She has said, "the origin of my depression was nothing other seeing myself as 'broken' for being autistic, ADHD and trans." On the 26th of May 2026, Metcalfe announced her ME/CFS diagnosis to her Instagram account.

== Discography ==
=== Albums ===
List of albums, with selected details
Title	Details
Sometimes Light	Released: December 1, 2010; Format: Digital; Label: Uboa
Jouissance	Released: October 1, 2013; Format: Digital; Label: Uboa; Note: Recorded between 2011 and 2013.
The Sky May Be	Released: October 18, 2018; Format: Digital; Label: Art As Catharsis Records
The Origin of My Depression	Released: February 14, 2019; Format: Digital, Vinyl (2023 Reissue), Cassette; Label: Uboa
Impossible Light	Released: June 28, 2024; Format: Digital, Cassette; Label: Uboa
All The Dead Melt Down As Rain	Released: June 19, 2025; Format: Digital; Label: The Flenser

=== Extended plays and other releases ===
List of albums, with selected details
Title	Details
Coma Wall	Released: September 24, 2015; Format: Digital, Cassette; Label: Void Worship; Release Type: Composition
Hook Echo	Released: July 27, 2017; Format: Digital; Label: Uboa; Release Type: Composition
Please Get Home Safely	Released: December 23, 2017; Format: Digital; Label: Uboa; Release Type: Split EP with Slumberkitty
The Apple of Every Eye	Released: June 15, 2018; Format: Digital; Label: Uboa; Release Type: EP with Muddy Lawrence
Uboa & Bolt Gun	Released: June 4, 2019; Format: Digital; Label: Uboa; Release Type: Split EP with Bolt Gun
The Absolute	Released: July 10, 2019; Format: Digital, Cassette; Label: Polar Wounds; Release Type: EP with Solus Varak
The Flesh of the World	Released: May 20, 2020; Format: Digital; Label: Uboa
Dead Time's Broken Arrow	Released: November 4, 2022; Format: Digital, Cassette; Label: hyperchaos tapes; Release Type: Spilt EP with teeth dreams

== Awards and nominations ==
=== Music Victoria Awards ===
The Music Victoria Awards are an annual awards night celebrating Victorian music. They commenced in 2006.

Year	Nominee / work	Award	Result	Ref.
Music Victoria Awards of 2019	Uboa (Xandra Metcalfe)	Best Experimental/Avant-Garde Act	Nominated	
Music Victoria Awards of 2019	The Origin of My Depression	Best Heavy Album	Nominated	
