= Waiting Room (album) =

Studio album by Kathryn Mohr
- Released: January 24, 2025
- Genre: Ambient pop
- Length: 46:02
- Label: The Flenser
- Producer: Kathryn Mohr

Kathryn Mohr chronology
Holly (2022)	Waiting Room (2025)

Singles from Waiting Room
- 1. "Driven" Released: November 12, 2024; 2. "Elevator" Released: December 18, 2024; 3. "Take It" Released: January 14, 2025

Waiting Room is the debut studio album by American experimental musician and songwriter Kathryn Mohr. It was released on January 24, 2025, by The Flenser. It features the singles, "Elevator", "Driven" and "Take It".

== Background ==
Released three years after her 2022 EP, Holly, Waiting Room was written by Mohr in a concrete room in an abandoned fish factory in Stöðvarfjörður, Iceland. It consists of eleven songs ranging between two and six minutes each, with a total runtime of approximately forty-six minutes, and it was mixed and mastered by Nicholas Wilbur in Anacortes, Washington. Noted as an ambient pop album, it also incorporates elements of goth folk. "Driven" was released as the lead single on November 12, 2024. The second single, "Elevator", was released on December 18, 2024, and the third single, "Take It", was released on January 14, 2025.

== Reception ==
Professional ratings
Review scores
Source	Rating
Beats Per Minute	75%
Pitchfork	8.4/10

Pitchfork rated the album 8.4 out of ten and noted in its review of the album, "Throughout Waiting Room, the contrast between Mohr's sinister production and surprisingly gentle vocals bridges the eerie and the sublime, recalling Grouper by way of Maria BC, or even Julianna Barwick." Beats Per Minute assigned it a score of "75 percent", stating "It shows its fondness for 90s lo-fi homerecording, but embellishes that with bloodless digital sounds and mixing-desk manipulation." BrooklynVegan described it as "a collection of dark, crackling, slow-moving songs that usually find Kathryn singing over a guitar, a piano, or an ambient texture."

== Track listing ==
All tracks are written by Kathryn Mohr.

Waiting Room track listing
No.	Title	Length
1.	"Diver"	3:20
2.	"Rated"	3:15
3.	"Driven"	4:35
4.	"Petrified"	4:09
5.	"Take It"	4:34
6.	"Elevator"	3:38
7.	"Prove It"	4:10
8.	"Horizonless"	3:31
9.	"Cornered"	5:17
10.	"Wheel"	3:07
11.	"Waiting Room"	6:26
Total length:		46:02

== Personnel ==
Credits adapted from the album's liner notes.

- Kathryn Mohr – lead vocals, recording, production, album art, layout
- Nicholas Wilbur – mixing, mastering
- Suzanne Yeremyan – additional layout work
