= Funeral Advantage =

- Origin: Boston, Massachusetts
- Genres: Indie rock, shoegaze, dream pop
- Years active: 2013–present
- Label: The Native Sound
- Website: funadv.org

Funeral Advantage is an American indie rock/dream pop band from Boston, Massachusetts, formed in 2013 by Tyler Kershaw. During live performances, Kershaw is joined by additional musicians.

To date, Funeral Advantage has released one studio album, Body is Dead in 2015 and two EPs, Demo (2013) and Please Help Me (2017) through The Native Sound. Tyler completed his second full record in 2018.

== History ==
Funeral Advantage released his first album, Body is Dead, on August 28, 2015, via The Native Sound. The album was well received critically and commercially, achieving a sold-out in just a few months after its release. It was followed by Please Help Me EP in January 2017. Boston Globe praised Kershaw for this songwriting skills and insightful lyrics.

== Discography ==
- Demo (EP) (Disposable America, 2013)
- Split 7" with Caténine (EP) (Disposable America, 2013)
- Not in My House / That's That (Double A-Side single) (The Native Sound, 2015)
- Split 7" with Former Ghosts (EP) (The Native Sound, 2015)
- Body Is Dead (The Native Sound, 2015)
- Body Is Dead (Demos) (The Native Sound, 2015)
- Please Help Me (EP) (The Native Sound, 2017)
- Nectarine (EP) (Sleep Well, 2019)
