= Desolation's Flower =

Studio album by Ragana
- Released: October 27, 2023
- Recorded: December 2022 – February 2023
- Studio: The Unknown, Anacortes, Washington
- Genre: Black metal
- Length: 41:00
- Label: The Flenser

Ragana chronology
You Take Nothing (2017)	Desolation's Flower (2023)

Desolation's Flower is the sixth studio album by American black metal duo Ragana, released on October 27, 2023, through the Flenser, the duo's first album on the label. It received the Best New Music honor from Pitchfork.

== Background and recording ==
The duo's work has political themes, and they described the title track as a "hymn of gratitude [...] to their queer and trans predecessors". Rolling Stone noted that the album's lyrics contained "proudly queer, anti-fascist politics." The album was recorded in a studio that was converted from a church in Anacortes, Washington.

== Critical reception ==
Professional ratings
Aggregate scores
Source	Rating
Metacritic	75/100
Review scores
Source	Rating
Exclaim!	7/10
The Guardian	3/5 stars
Pitchfork	8.3/10

Desolation's Flower received a score of 75 out of 100 on review aggregator Metacritic based on four critics' reviews, indicating "generally favorable" reception. Pitchfork awarded the album their "Best New Music" distinction, with the site's Evan Minsker calling it "a sludgy and simmering call to action", and writing that the duo "splice panoptic frenzy with near-ambient calm to underscore the present fraught moment in history where oppression is written into law". Stereogum named it album of the week, with Tom Breihan commenting that if the album "is your first exposure to Ragana, as it was for me, then you are in for an experience", elaborating that "in many places, Desolation's Flower is a sad, angry piece of music. But in moments like that, it also brings a towering, resonant sense of beauty and tranquility".

Ben Beaumont-Thomas of The Guardian felt that the songs "wander between post-rock, stoner rock, doom and black metal" and while "too often in the quieter sections, the duo opt for ponderous arpeggiated runs of notes that make their songs feel pedestrian rather than merely slow[,] when they bring in groove [...] they carry the listener aloft to a hard-won clarity". Exclaim!'s Jeremy Sheehy stated that "while it isn't a perfect record, it's filled with the kind of raw, honest emotionality that has punctuated the band's work and made them a darling of the underground metal community".

Rolling Stone named it the third-best metal album of 2023, praising the band's "powerful pathos, and the innate synchronicity of their approach."

== Track listing ==
Desolation's Flower track listing
No.	Title	Length
1.	"Desolation's Flower"	8:29
2.	"Woe"	6:35
3.	"Ruins"	5:55
4.	"DTA"	4:04
5.	"Winter's Light Pt. 2"	7:10
6.	"Pain"	3:57
7.	"In the Light of the Burning World"	5:15
Total length:		41:00

== Personnel ==
- Maria – vocals, guitars, drums
- N.D.K.G. – drums, vocals, guitars, layout, design
- Nicholas Wilbur – recording, mixing and mastering
- Bailey Kobelin – cover photo
- Suzanne Yeremyan – additional layout and design
