= Faetooth =

American doom metal band

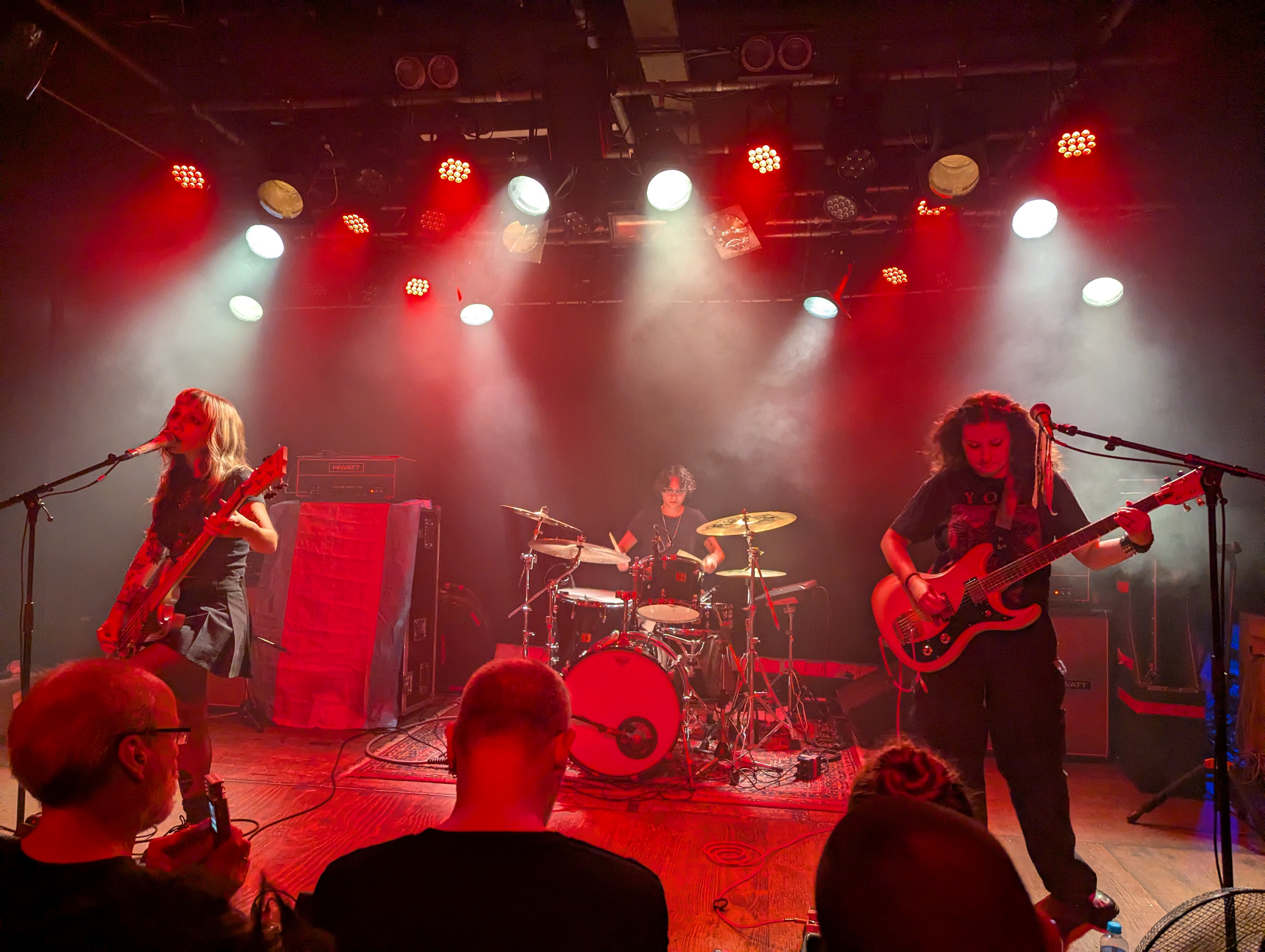

Background information
- Origin: Los Angeles, US
- Genres: Doom metal, sludge metal, post-metal, shoegaze
- Years active: 2019–present
- Labels: The Flenser, Dune Altar
- Members: Jenna Garcia; Rah Kanan; Ari May
- Past members: Ashla Chavez-Razzano

Faetooth is an American doom metal band. Their sound features elements from sludge metal, shoegaze and post-metal, and many of their lyrics deal with themes of folklore and spirituality; the band describes their musical style as "fairy-doom metal".

== History ==
The band was founded in Los Angeles, California in 2019, by Jenna Garcia (bass, vocals), Rah Kanan (drums), Ari May (guitar, vocals) and Ashla Chavez-Razzano (guitar, vocals). That same year, the group self-released the EP ...An Invocation on digital format; the record would be re-released on vinyl through the LA label Dune Altar Records in 2021.

Their first full-length album would be released in 2022, titled Remnants of the Vessel. It was also self-released digitally, with physical formats (vinyl, cassette and CD) released through Dune Altar. The album was supported by two singles: "Echolalia" and "La Sorcière".

In 2023, Chavez-Razzano parted ways with the group, founding art-folk group Rabbit Rabbit Rabbit; Faetooth continued as a trio. The next year, the song "Discarnate" (from Remnants of the Vessel) was featured on the Trip to California (Doom Edition) digital compilation by music promoter Weedian.

In 2025, the band released their second studio album, Labyrinthine, now signed to San Francisco label The Flenser. The album was supported by three singles – "Death of Day", "White Noise" and "Hole" – and again released in four different formats (digital, vinyl, cassette and CD).

== Band members ==
=== Current ===
- Jenna Garcia – bass, vocals (2019–present)
- Rah Kanan – drums (2019–present)
- Ari May – guitars, vocals (2019–present)

=== Past ===
- Ashla Chavez-Razzano – guitars, vocals (2019–2023)

== Discography ==
=== Studio releases ===
Year	Title	Release details	Tracklist
2019	...An Invocation (EP)	Release date: December 28, 2019 (digital); November 5, 2021 (vinyl); Formats: digital, vinyl; Label: self-released (digital), Dune Altar (vinyl)	1. Fifth Circle (4:22); 2. Guilt Machine (4:01); 3. Prunes (4:52); 4. Glass (4:29)
2022	Remnants of the Vessel	Release date: October 28, 2022; Formats: digital, CD, cassette, vinyl; Label: self-released (digital), Dune Altar (physical formats)	1. (I) Naissance (0:41); 2. Echolalia (5:06); 3. La Sorcière (6:05); 4. She Cast a Shadow (4:11); 5. (II) Limbo (3:08); 6. Remains (7:01); 7. Discarnate (5:10); 8. Strange Ways (7:22); 9. (III) Moribund (1:00); 10. Saturn Devouring His Son (9:31)
2025	Labyrinthine	Release date: September 5, 2025; Formats: digital, CD, cassette, vinyl; Label: The Flenser (all formats)	1. Iron Gate (4:01); 2. Death of Day (5:34); 3. It Washes Over (5:52); 4. Hole (6:01); 5. White Noise (6:09); 6. Eviscerate (5:49); 7. October (4:38); 8. Mater Dolorosa (5:46); 9. The Well (2:31); 10. Meet Your Maker (8:28)

=== Singles ===
- "Echolalia" (2022) (from Remnants of the Vessel)
- "La Sorcière" (2022) (from Remnants of the Vessel)
- "Death of Day" (2025) (from Labyrinthine)
- "White Noise" (2025) (from Labyrinthine)
- "Hole" (2025) (from Labyrinthine)

=== Other ===
- Track "Discarnate" featured on Trip to California (Doom Edition) (2024) (compilation by Weedian)

== Awards and nominations ==
=== Berlin Music Video Awards ===
The Berlin Music Video Awards is an international festival that promotes the art of music videos.

Year	Nominated work	Award	Result	Ref.
2026	"Hole"	Best Performer	Nominated	
