= Saint Vitus (venue) =

Bar and music venue in Brooklyn, New York

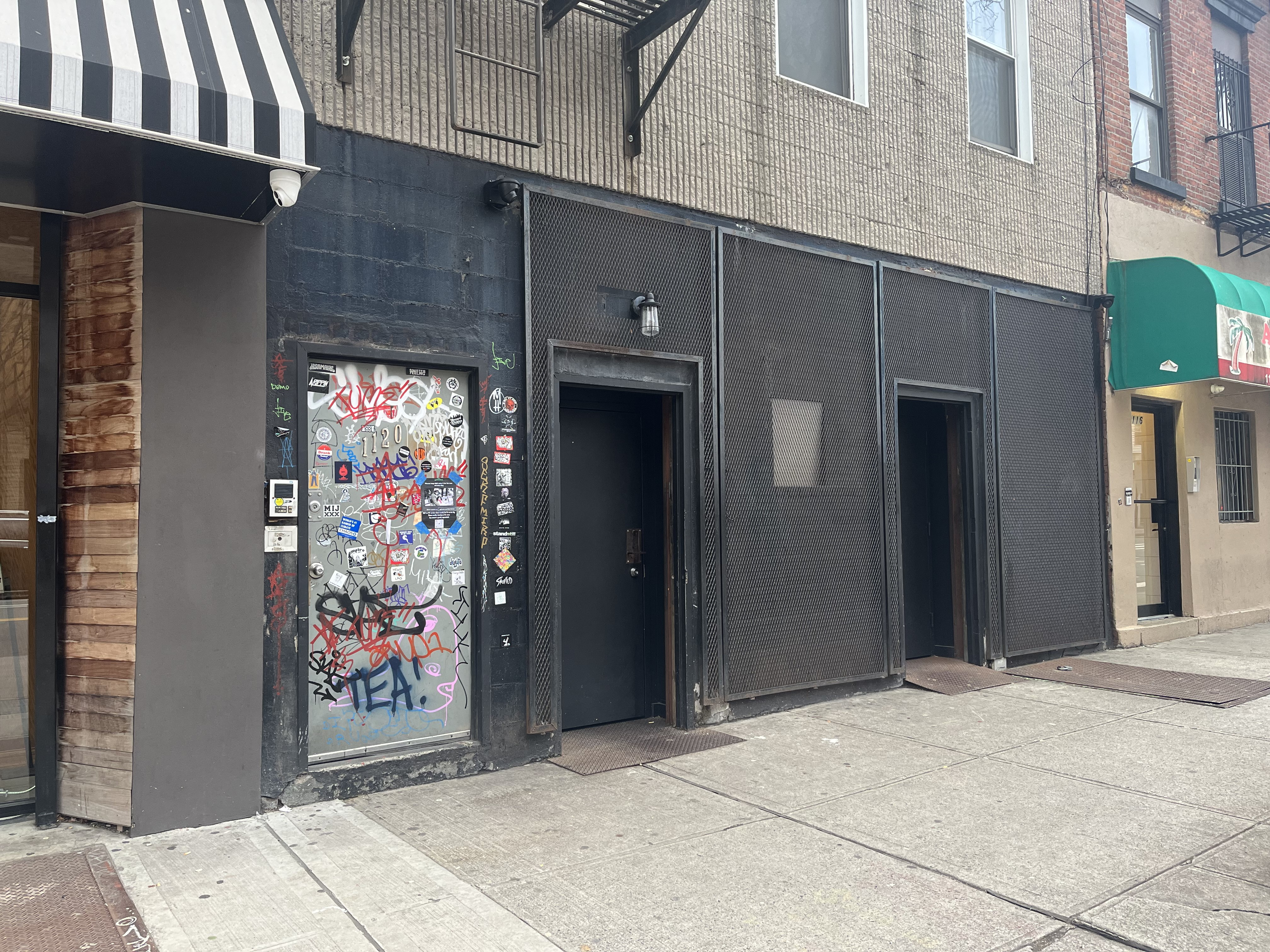
- Exterior of the former Saint Vitus in 2023
- Interactive map of Saint Vitus
- Address: 428 Troutman St (2026–present) 1120 Manhattan Ave (2011–2024)
- Location: Bushwick, Brooklyn, New York
- Coordinates: 40°42′25.6″N 73°55′19.0″W
- Capacity: 500 (2026) 250 (2011–2024)
- Type: Bar and music venue

Construction
- Opened: April 11, 2011
- Closed: February 16, 2024

Website
- saintvitusbar.com

Saint Vitus, also called Saint Vitus Bar, is a bar and music venue located in the Bushwick neighborhood of Brooklyn, New York.

The original location opened in Greenpoint in April 2011, and the 2,500 square feet (230 m^{2}) venue was known for its heavy metal atmosphere. The magazine Kerrang! described Saint Vitus as "one of the most important locations to see loud music in the entire world." Pitchfork named it "The Best Metal Bar in New York City".

The New York City Department of Buildings permanently closed Saint Vitus in February 2024 over multiple violations. In July 2026, the venue announced a new location in Bushwick.

== History ==
=== Original location ===
Saint Vitus was opened in April 2011 by Arty Shepherd, Justin Scurti, and George Souleidis, along with two silent owners. The space was formerly a plumbing school and before that a social club, and the owners hired Matthew Maddy to design the space, with the main intention to be a metal-themed bar that only occasionally held live shows. The name was chosen because it was shared with the doom metal band Saint Vitus, a Bauhaus song, a Black Sabbath song and the St. Vitus Cathedral in Prague.

The first show held there was Liturgy on May 6, 2011. The band Saint Vitus played the venue on September 25, 2012. In its early days, Pitchfork writer Brandon Stosuy booked bands such as Converge, Deafheaven and Iceage to play the venue because, in his words, "if you’re into loud music, and you live in New York, it’s where you want to go to see a show."

In 2013, Shepherd and David Castillo, Saint Vitus's talent buyer, started up a record label called Sacrament Recordings and Merchandise to release an album by the band Sannhet.

On April 10, 2014, the surviving members of Nirvana played an invite-only show at Saint Vitus directly after their Rock and Roll Hall of Fame induction ceremony at Barclays Center. Dave Grohl and Krist Novoselic were joined by guest vocalists Joan Jett, J Mascis, Annie Clark, John McCauley and Kim Gordon.

In April 2016, Saint Vitus celebrated its five-year anniversary with five nights of shows featuring headlining sets from Pallbearer, Corrosion of Conformity, Royal Thunder, and 13th Chime.

Saint Vitus hosted weekly metal yoga sessions run by Metal Yoga Bones. In addition, visual artist Karlynn Holland periodically curated day-long art shows under the moniker Dreams Were Made For Mortals.

The music video for St. Vincent's "Fast Slow Disco", released on June 21, 2018, was filmed at Saint Vitus and named the tenth-best music video of the year by Rolling Stone.

On April 7, 2020, the venue launched a Kickstarter page to help the business stay afloat while it was forced to close during the COVID-19 pandemic. The campaign's goal was set at $15,000, but wound up raising upwards of $125,000 in less than two months.

In 2023, the venue announced a 346-page book by photographer and employee Nathaniel C. Shannon, Saint Vitus Bar: The First 10 Years: An Oral and Visual History, featuring essays and interviews from figures including Dave Mustaine, Laura Jane Grace and Chuck Klosterman.

=== Closure ===
On February 16, 2024, Saint Vitus was indefinitely shut down by the New York City Department of Buildings for multiple violations, including the absence of maximum occupancy signs and improper certifications for assembly and drinking. The venue was raided in the middle of a performance by the band Balmora, opening for Mindforce. The organizers continued to host shows in other venues across the city under the banner "Saint Vitus Presents" while promising a potential reopening, but on August 17, 2024, the venue confirmed that it was now permanently closed in an Instagram post reading: "1120 Manhattan Ave. 2011-2024. Saint Vitus Bar to be continued… Thank you to everyone who was a part of it. ???? Love and Hails, Arty, George, David."

Several artists and bands who played at Saint Vitus, including Thursday, Chelsea Wolfe, Ethel Cain and Saetia, paid tribute to the venue on social media.

=== Reopening ===
On July 3, 2026, Saint Vitus announced its new location in Bushwick, at the site of a former venue named Brooklyn Made which shut down in February 2025. Their first show back was Anthrax on September 4, 2026.

== Notable events ==
- May 6, 2011: Liturgy, venue's first show
- November 3, 2011: Black Sabbath's Tony Iommi book signing
- April 23–28, 2012: One-Year Anniversary Celebration
- September 8, 2012: Descendents, after Riot Fest Brooklyn was canceled early after a tornado warning
- September 25, 2012: Saint Vitus
- September 25, 2013: Carcass and Immolation
- October 11, 2013: Judge
- April 10, 2014: Nirvana tribute show with Dave Grohl, Krist Novoselic, Joan Jett, J Mascis, Annie Clark (St. Vincent), John McCauley of Deer Tick, and Kim Gordon formerly of Sonic Youth
- January 25–26, 2015: Zola Jesus, including a performance outside in the snow
- April 28, 2015: John Lydon aka Johnny Rotten of the Sex Pistols book signing
- October 27, 2015: Carrie Brownstein (of Sleater-Kinney) in conversation with Questlove
- February 22, 2016: Lita Ford book reading
- July 14, 2016: Gojira, rare club show, on Bastille Day and Nice terrorist attack
- August 20, 2016: The Obelisk All-Dayer, a one-day festival hosted by The Obelisk with Mars Red Sky headlining
- September 16–17, 2016: Anthrax, benefit shows for Gilda's Club cancer support group
- December 12, 2016: Megadeth, billed as Vic and the Rattleheads
- March 17–19, 2019: Thursday, band's planned final shows
- May 16, 2019: Killing Joke, 40th anniversary
- September 19, 2019: Blink-182, warmup show days before Barclays Center stop
- November 17–19, 2022: Saetia, first shows since 1999
- February 18, 2023: The Sleeping, including the announcement of the band's permanent reunion and new album.
- October 27–28, 2023: Gridlink, performing their final two shows
- February 16, 2024: Mindforce, venue's final show. Show was cut early during opening band Balmora
- September 4, 2026: Anthrax, first show in new location
