= Created in the Image of Suffering =

2017 King Woman album

Studio album by King Woman
- Released: February 24, 2017
- Studio: The Atomic Garden (Palo Alto, California)
- Genre: Doom metal, post-metal, shoegaze
- Length: 38:50
- Label: Relapse
- Producer: Jack Shirley

King Woman chronology
| Doubt (2015) | Created in the Image of Suffering (2017) | Celestial Blues (2021) |

Created in the Image of Suffering is the debut studio album by American doom metal band King Woman, released on February 24, 2017, through Relapse Records. The album has strong religious themes, inspired by the band's lead member Kristina Esfandiari's upbringing in a Charismatic Christian church. The album was recorded with producer Jack Shirley at the Atomic Garden in Palo Alto, California. King Woman supported Created in the Image of Suffering with an international tour, including a performance at Roadburn Festival.

The album's cover art was created by Esfandiari's friend Ars Moriendee, after appearing to Esfandiari in a "weird vision". She explained the vision to Moriendee, who then "made it come to life."

== Critical reception ==
The album was included in Consequence of Sound's '10 Most Anticipated Metal Albums of 2017' list.

Upon its release, the album received positive reviews from music critics. Metal Injection's Jeremy Ulrey described the album as "An impressive debut by a group that has admirably hewn their own path to get here."

The album ranked 22 on Noisey's top 100 albums of 2017 list. The album was also included by Pitchfork in its list of The 10 Best Metal Albums of 2017. The Guardian music critic Charlotte Richardson Andrews chose Created in the Image of Suffering as one of the best albums of 2017.

Metalriot.com chose the album as their number one best album for all of 2017. Morgan Y. Evans wrote: "It channels the horror and pain of our times perfectly but doesn’t give up..."

== Track listing ==
| No. | Title | Length |
|---|---|---|
| 1. | "Utopia" | 3:10 |
| 2. | "Deny" | 3:54 |
| 3. | "Shame" | 3:39 |
| 4. | "Hierophant" | 7:59 |
| 5. | "Worn" | 4:37 |
| 6. | "Manna" | 6:16 |
| 7. | "Hem" | 8:06 |

== Personnel ==
- Kristina Esfandiari – vocals, guitar
- Colin Gallagher – guitar
- Peter Arensdorf – bass
- Joey Raygoza – drums
