= Sannhet =

American experimental metal band

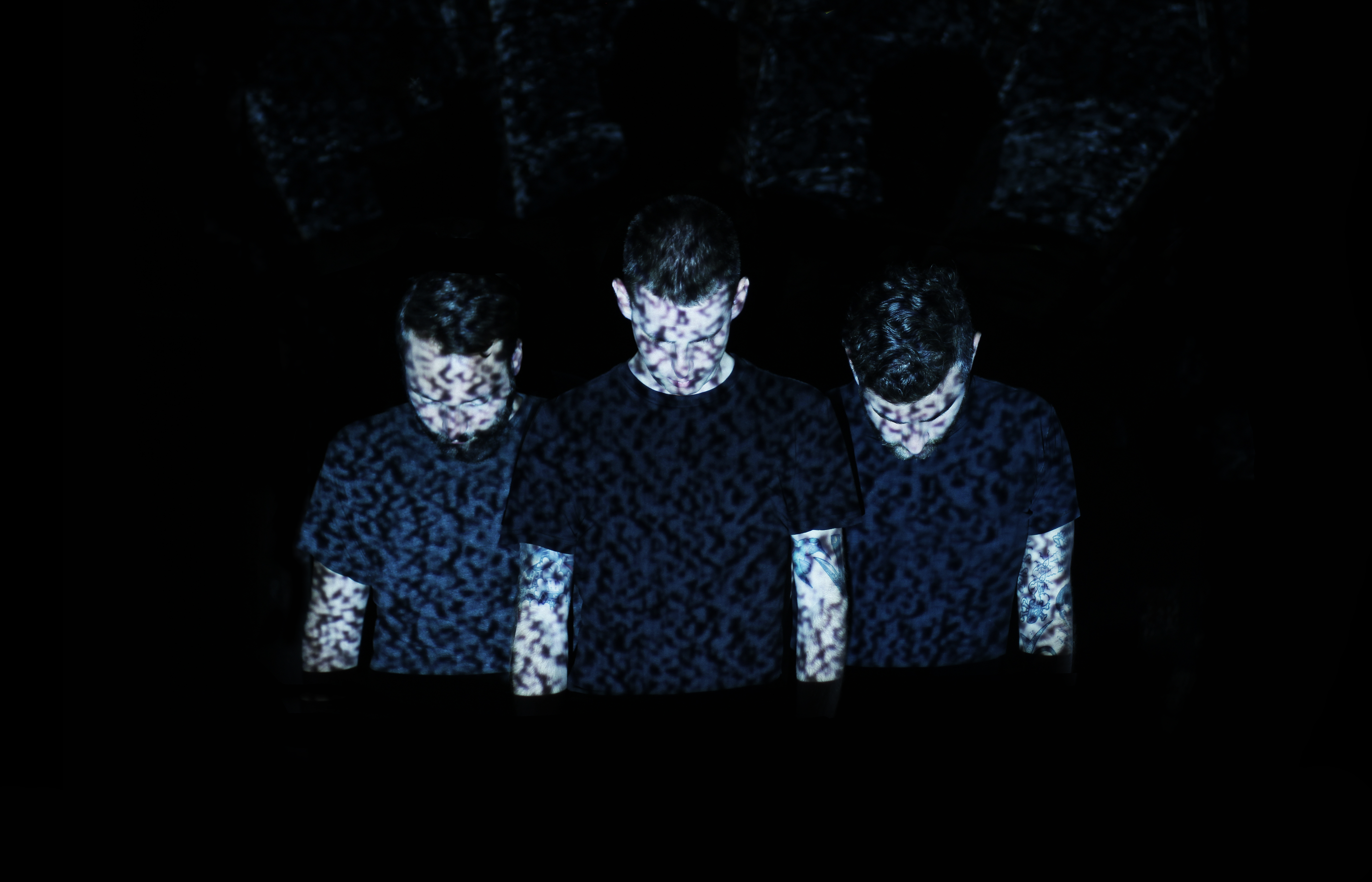
- Sannhet in 2013

Background information
- Origin: Brooklyn, New York, U.S.
- Genres: Instrumental metal; post-metal; sludge metal; black metal
- Years active: 2010–present
- Labels: Sacrament, Consouling Sounds, The Flenser, Hospital Productions, Profound Lore Records
- Members: John Refano; AJ Annunziata
- Past members: Christopher Todd

Sannhet (Norwegian for "truth") is an American experimental metal band from Brooklyn, New York, United States. The band formed in 2010 by John Refano, Christopher Todd, and AJ Annunziata. They have released three full-length albums as well as a variety of EPs and singles which were collected together and released in their 2016 compilation album Young Death. Sannhet has become known for their elaborate live shows which combine their "dense" sound with lights, projected visualizations and rhythm-synced strobes. They are an instrumental band with a sound that combines black metal, sludge metal, and shoegaze with the structures and orders of post-rock and post-punk, though unlike other bands with similar influences, they tend to favor shorter song structures.

== History ==
The band released their debut album Known Flood on February 19, 2013, through Sacrament, an imprint owned by staff at the Saint Vitus bar. The album has been described as "pristine post-rock with dirty noise and hardcore, and it wouldn't be wrong to affix the word "blackened" to the overall sound." Pitchfork's Grayson Currin gave the album a positive review, writing that "each of the longer numbers roll several themes and transitions into a relatively compact framework, again avoiding boredom by a bustle of activity. “Slow Ruin,” one of two that makes it past seven minutes, volleys from field recordings to Touch and Go throb, from post-millennial blackened grandeur to an expansive noise fadeaway." On October 14 they released a music video for the track 'Slow Ruin' directed by Aj Annunziata. On November 12 they released a two-track EP 'Lions Eye', described as funneling "both brawn and versatility into likably finite spaces."

The band released their second album Revisionist on March 3, 2015, through The Flenser. A number of tracks including "Lost Crown" were premiered on music websites in advance of the album's release. The album was received well, with positive reviews and coverage by Pitchfork, Stereogum, MetalSucks, Metal Injection, and more. Critics noted the experimental, diverse sound of the album, such as the "pummeling black-metal drums", "tense rhythmic lock of death metal", and the "astral ascendance of space-rock." Pitchfork's editor Brandon Stosuy named it the 10th best metal album of 2015, while Jayson Greene nominated it as one of the most overlooked albums of 2015 and Ian Cohen named the title track 'Best New Track'. In a review of Revisionist, the New York Times described the album as "many layers of guitar [forming] dissonant harmonies; sections grow and vary, never fully returning to where they started. Sometimes they are abstract, with found-sound voice recordings and clouds of echo. They’re also easy to follow, emotionally clear." On April 18 the band performed alongside Prurient, Andy Stott and others as part of Pitchfork's Tinnitus Music Series in Brooklyn, New York.

On June 30, 2016, the band released a compilation album titled Young Death, drawing together and remastering rare early material and unreleased material spanning from 2008 to 2013. It was released digitally by the band themselves while Hospital Productions issued the album on vinyl. Later that same year, the band released the single 'Short Life' as part of Adult Swim's 2016 Singles compilation series, confirming that they are working on a third album. Pitchfork wrote that "the four-minute track bears a fresh coat of corpse paint, teeming with pulverizing blast beats and tremolo guitars that wail like professional mourners." Stereogum described it as "a scorching four-minute instrumental, with a focus on speed-picking doused in reverb and an impressive, anchoring drum pattern."

== Members ==
- John Refano - guitar and loopers
- AJ Annunziata - bass guitar and visuals

== Discography ==
Studio albums

- Known Flood (2013; Sacrament (vinyl/digital), Consouling Sounds (CD))
- Revisionist (2015; Flenser Records)
- So Numb (2017; Profound Lore Records)

EPs

- Sannhet (2011)
- Lions Eye (2013; Sacrament)
- Short Life (2019; Profound Lore)

Compilations

- Young Death (2016; Hospital Productions)
