= Wreck and Reference =

American experimental rock band

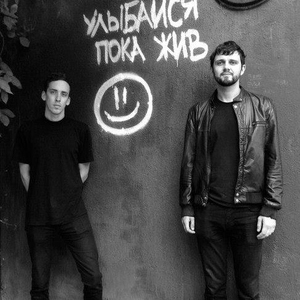

Background information
- Origin: Davis, California, United States
- Genres: Experimental rock; experimental metal; noise rock; drone
- Years active: 2008–present
- Label: The Flenser
- Spinoffs: Hand Model; EVANDER.
- Members: Ignat Frege; Felix Skinner
- Past members: Sam Chiang
- Website: wreckandreference.bandcamp.com

Wreck and Reference is an experimental rock group based in Los Angeles, California.

== History ==
Wreck and Reference (sometimes stylized as Wreck & Reference or W&R) started out as a garage project in Davis, California, in 2008. In 2012, the band released an LP, Y̶o̶u̶t̶h (pronounced "No Youth") and in 2013, released an EP, C̶o̶n̶t̶e̶n̶t (pronounced "No Content"). Later in 2014, their second full-length album Want was featured on "The Best Metal Albums of 2014" list by Pitchfork. Want was followed by a 75-track, online-only release of the samples used to create the electronic instrumentals on the record.

== Members ==
=== Current lineup ===
- Felix Skinner – vocals, production (2008–present)
- Ignat Frege – vocals, production, drums (2008–present)

=== Former members ===
- Sam Chiang – guitars (?–2011)

== Discography ==
Studio albums

- No Youth (2012)
- Want (2014)
- Indifferent Rivers Romance End (2016)
- Absolute Still Life (2019)
- Stay Calm (2025)

EPs

- Black Cassette (2011)
- No Content (2013)
- Alien Pains (2018)

Miscellaneous

- Spill/Fill (2014)
