= Kentucky (Panopticon album) =

Studio album by Panopticon
- Released: June 4, 2012
- Recorded: 2011–2012
- Genre: Black metal, bluegrass, Americana
- Length: 51:24
- Label: The Flenser, Handmade Birds
- Producer: Austin Lunn

Panopticon chronology
Social Disservices (2011)	Kentucky (2012)	Roads to the North (2014)

Professional ratings
Review scores
Source	Rating
AllMusic	5/5 stars
Invisible Oranges	Positive
Sputnikmusic	2.5/5 stars

Kentucky is the fifth studio album from black metal band Panopticon. The album combines styles of bluegrass and Appalachian music with black metal. The album has strong political and environmentalism themes.

== Track listing ==
All tracks are written by Austin Lunn, except where noted.

No.	Title	Writer(s)	Length
1.	"Bernheim Forest in Spring"		2:53
2.	"Bodies Under the Falls"		10:27
3.	"Come All Ye Coal Miners"	Sarah Ogan Gunning	4:13
4.	"Black Soot and Red Blood"		10:11
5.	"Which Side Are You On?"	Florence Reece	2:59
6.	"Killing the Giants as They Sleep"		12:24
7.	"Black Waters"	Jean Ritchie	4:56
8.	"Kentucky"		3:21
Total length:			51:24

== Personnel ==
- Austin Lunn – vocals, instrumentation, arrangement, composition, production
- Johan Becker – violin
- Colin Marston – mixing, mastering
