= So Numb =

Studio album by Sannhet
- Released: August 25, 2017
- Recorded: 2017 at Tarquin Studios, Bridgeport, CT
- Genre: Post-rock, instrumental metal
- Length: 42:55
- Label: Profound Lore
- Producer: Peter Katis

Sannhet chronology
Revisionist (2015)	So Numb (2017)

Professional ratings
Review scores
Source	Rating
Pitchfork	8.0/10
PopMatters	7/10 stars
Sputnikmusic	3.3/5

So Numb is the third studio album by the American instrumental metal band Sannhet. Produced by Peter Katis, it was released on August 25, 2017 through independent label Profound Lore Records.

== Track listing ==
All music is composed by AJ Annunziata, John Refano, and Christopher Todd, except where noted.

No.	Title	Music	Length
1.	"Indigo Illusion"		4:39
2.	"Sapphire"		4:27
3.	"So Numb"		3:30
4.	"Fernbeds"	Thom Wasluck	7:29
5.	"Salts"		5:44
6.	"Way Out"		4:46
7.	"Secondary Arrows"		4:08
8.	"Sleep Well"		4:36
9.	"Wind Up"		3:36
Total length:			42:55

== Personnel ==
Sannhet

- AJ Annunziata – bass guitar and visuals
- John Refano – guitar and loopers
- Christopher Todd – drums and samples

Additional musicians

- Thom Wasluck – additional guitars on "Fernbeds"

Artwork

- AJ Annunziata – photography
- Stephanie Kimerly – photo assist
- Jane Lea and Henry Stosuy – photo subjects

Production

- Peter Katis – production, engineering, mixing
- Greg Giorgio – recording
- Jason Ward – mastering at Chicago Mastering Service
