= Madeline Johnston =

American musician

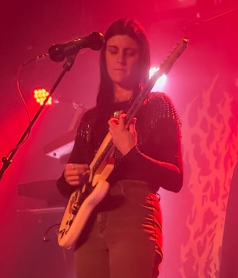
- Johnston performing as Midwife in 2024

Background information
- Born: Madeline Elizabeth Johnston
- Origin: Denver, Colorado
- Genres: Slowcore; shoegaze; dream pop; ambient; drone
- Label: The Flenser
- Website: heavenmetal.bandcamp.com

Madeline Elizabeth Johnston is an American singer-songwriter, multi-instrumentalist, and audio engineer. She is best known for her work under the moniker Midwife, and has also released music as Mariposa and Sister Grotto. Johnston describes her music as "heaven metal".

== Career ==
Johnston's debut album, as Mariposa, was titled Holy Ghost and released in 2013. As Sister Grotto, Johnston released You Don't Have to Be a House to Be Haunted, Blindside, and Song For An Unborn Sun (alongside Devin Shaffer as Yarrow) in 2016.

In 2017, Johnston released her first album as Midwife, Like Author, Like Daughter accompanied by Tucker Theodore on instrumentation. Her next two albums as Midwife were Forever (2020) and Luminol (2021). As Midwife, she would later release Orbweaving (2023) a collaborative LP with Vyva Melinkolya (Angel Diaz). She also featured on the second single from Vyva Melinkolya's album Unbecoming (2023), titled "Doomer GF Song". Johnston's fourth album as Midwife, No Depression in Heaven, was released in 2024. Paste named it the 66th-best album of 2024. "Killdozer" was Consequence's 17th-best and Stereogum's 37th-best song of 2024.

Midwife was named as an Artist in Residence for the 2025 Roadburn Festival.

== Discography ==
=== Mariposa ===
- Holy Ghost (2013)

=== Sister Grotto ===
- You Don't Have to Be a House to Be Haunted (2016)
- Song for an Unborn Sun (2016)
- Blindside (2016)

=== Midwife ===
- Like Author, Like Daughter (2017)
- Forever (2020)
- Luminol (2021)
- Orbweaving (2023) (collaboration with Vyva Melinkolya)
- No Depression in Heaven (2024)
- Never Die (2025) (collaboration with Matt Jencik)
