= Mamaleek =

American rock band

- Mamaleek performing in 2025

Background information
- Origin: San Francisco, CA , U.S.
- Genres: Black metal; jazz metal; electronic; noise rock
- Years active: 2008–present
- Labels: Enemies List., The Flenser
- Members: 4 (anonymous)
- Past members: Eric Alan Livingston
- Website: mamaleek.bandcamp.com

Mamaleek is an American experimental metal group from San Francisco, founded in 2008 by two anonymous brothers. The name supposedly derives from Arabic, and is the plural of mamluk, or "slave".

In 2011, the band was signed with Enemies List; that year, their album Kurdaitcha topped Leor Galil's "Best Free Albums of 2011" list. The band has released nine albums, and are signed with the San Francisco-based alternative label The Flenser.

Regarding the band's style and genre, Noisey wrote: "It's black metal, but then again, it isn't; there are massive electronic, jazz, and psychedelic influences, as well as pronounced Middle Eastern inclinations in melody and aesthetic". According to Stereoboard, they "are a band like no other....Portishead playing lo-fi metal might be somewhere vaguely near the mark". Galil said they "mix Middle Eastern song structures and samples, atonal experimental and avant-garde accents, guttural metal howls, accessible electronic breakbeats, sludgy doom metal guitar-work, nimble piano interludes, and plenty of pop panache to create an unrelenting, moving sound".

Band member Eric Alan Livingston died on March 6, 2023, at the age of 38.

== Discography ==
=== Albums ===
- Mamaleek (February 11, 2008), self-released
- Fever Dream (November 2008), Furusiyya Recordings
- Kurdaitcha (March 15, 2011), Flenser Records
- Via Dolorosa (May 26, 2015), Flenser Records
- Out of Time, Flenser Records (August 31, 2018), Flenser Records
- Come & See (March 27, 2020), Flenser Records
- Diner Coffee (September 30, 2022), Flenser Records
- Vida Blue (August 9, 2024), Flenser Records

=== EPs ===
- He Never Spoke A Mumblin’ Word – EP (July 22, 2014), Flenser Records
- Those Who Pass Between Fleeting Words – EP (December 1, 2023), Flenser Records
