= Ragana (band) =

American black metal duo

- Origin: Olympia, Washington, U.S.
- Genres: Black metal; doom metal
- Years active: 2011–present
- Labels: The Flenser, An Out Recordings
- Members: Maria Stocke; Noel D.K. Gilson
- Website: www.ragana.org

Ragana is an American black metal duo from Olympia, Washington formed in 2011. In 2014, the band relocated to Oakland, California. As of 2024, both members have moved back to Olympia. The band has been described as a “queer antifascist black metal/doom duo".

== History ==
Ragana formed in 2011 after the duo Maria Stocke and Noel Gilson met each other at a grocery store in Olympia, Washington and bonded over the Olympia black metal band Wolves in the Throne Room. Maria originated from Tacoma, Washington while Noel came from Southern California. The band’s name is the Latvian and Lithuanian word for "witch".

The duo released their debut album All's Lost in 2012 and their second album Unbecoming in 2013. That year, both members moved to California. In 2015, Ragana released their third album Wash Away on the Portland-based record label An Out, which the band carefully chose because of the label's anarchist, queer, feminist and anti-racist ideology. The band rejected another label's offer to put out the album because the duo felt that the label did not take any strong political stances.

On November 9, 2016, the day following Donald Trump's victory in the presidential election, Ragana released "You Take Nothing", and proceeds went to Standing Rock Indian Reservation's Sacred Stone Camp. It became the title track to the band's fourth album, released in 2017 on An Out, which contained songs such as "Spare No Man" written about sexual harassment. In 2018, the band released a split album with Thou titled Let Our Names Be Forgotten. Ragana was slated to play an anti-fascist concert event in Brooklyn in January 2019 but canceled due to a member's illness. The band released the cassette-only EP We Know that the Heavens are Empty in 2019.

In 2022, Ragana opened for The Microphones on their West Coast dates and signed to record label The Flenser. Their fifth album Desolation's Flower was released in 2023, which was their first in six years. The band described the title track as "a hymn of gratitude for queer and trans ancestors." It received the "Best New Music" honor from Pitchfork and was named the third-best metal album of 2023 by Rolling Stone, who praised its "proudly queer, anti-fascist politics." The title track was listed as the 91st-best song of 2023 by Pitchfork. Following the album's release, Ragana performed at the 2024 Roadburn Festival in Tilburg, Netherlands, including a collaboration with labelmate Drowse titled The Ash From Mount Saint Helens. In 2025, the band opened for Mount Eerie on their west coast dates.

== Musical style ==
Ragana's sound has been described as "blackened doom metal". Both members call the drums as their primary instrument and alternate vocals, guitar and songwriting. Maria believes her songwriting leans more simple and lyrics-based, while Noel writes the more complex songs.

The band has cited artists such as Wolves in the Throne Room, Cat Power, Grouper, Mount Eerie and Battle of Mice as influences.

== Discography ==
=== Studio albums ===
- All's Lost (2012)
- Unbecoming (2013)
- Wash Away (2015)
- You Take Nothing (2017)
- Desolation's Flower (2023)
- Ash Souvenir (2025)

=== Split albums ===
- Let Our Names Be Forgotten (with Thou) (2018)

=== Extended plays ===
- We Know that the Heavens are Empty (2019)
