= Celestial Blues =

Studio album by King Woman
- Released: 30 July 2021
- Studios: The Atomic Garden, Oakland, California
- Genres: Doom metal, grunge, post-rock
- Length: 40:52
- Label: Relapse
- Producer: kris Esfandiari

King Woman chronology
Created in the Image of Suffering (2017)	Celestial Blues (2021)

Celestial Blues is the second studio album by Kristina Esfandiari-fronted American doom metal band King Woman, released on July 30, 2021 through Relapse Records. It follows King Woman's debut album, 2017's Created in the Image of Suffering. The album was recorded by Jack Shirley in December 2019 at The Atomic Garden in Oakland, California. Like Created in the Image of Suffering, Celestial Blues is thematically-inspired by Esfandiari's childhood with her charismatic Christian parents.

The album received favorable reviews from critics, who praised its themes, performances, and production. Celestial Blues debuted at No. 13 on the Billboard Current Rock Albums Chart.

== Writing and recording ==
Esfandiari wrote each of the album's 9 tracks and was responsible for the production and sound design, which took place in December 2019 at The Atomic Garden in Oakland, California. Jack Shirley was responsible for recording, mixing and mastering the album. In the absence of former guitarist Colin Gallagher, Peter Arsendorf played both bass and guitar on Celestial Blues, Joey Raygoza again featured on drums and Esfandiari performed on vocals.

== Release and promotion ==
The release of Celestial Blues was preceded by the release of three singles. "Morning Star" was released on June 2, 2021, accompanied by a one-shot music video directed by Muted Widows. "Psychic Wound" followed on June 30, 2021, also with a video directed by Muted Widows. The final single "Boghz" was released on July 14, 2021, and premiered on Office Magazine.

Celestial Blues was released by Relapse Records on July 30, 2021. In its first week of release, it reached Billboard chart positions of number four on Current Hard Music Albums, number nine on Independent Current Albums, number 13 on Current Rock Albums, number 35 on Current Album Sales, and number 43 on Vinyl Albums.

== Critical reception ==
Celestial Blues ratings
Aggregate scores
Source	Rating
Metacritic	83/100
Review scores
Source	Rating
Beats Per Minute	83/100
Kerrang!	4/5
Pitchfork	7.5/10
Sputnikmusic	4.5/5

According to the review aggregator Metacritic, Celestial Blues received "universal acclaim" based on a weighted average score of 83 out of 100 from 5 critic scores. Angela Davey of Kerrang! gave the album 4/5, comparing Esfandiari's vocals to PJ Harvey's on Is This Desire?. John Amen of Beats per Minute gave the album 83%, calling Esfandiari "a modern-day gnostic", referring to the themes of spiritual inquiry on Celestial Blues. Kim Kelly of Pitchfork gave the album 7.5/10, praising the band's performance and comparing Celestial Blues favorably to Created in the Image of Suffering: "King Woman's ability to outdo themselves continues apace, and the bar continues to rise each time Esfandiari sheds her skin anew". Max Heilman of Metal Injection gave Celestial Blues 8/10, noting that "What truly makes it stand out becomes how it embodies the 'Blues' as well as the 'Celestial'." Dewinged of Sputnikmusic gave the album 4.5/5, calling Celestial Blues "Kris' most honest and enrapturing work of her prolific career".

== Live performances ==
King Woman played two shows on consecutive nights, July 30 and 31, 2021, at Lodge Room in Highland Park, California, to celebrate the release of Celestial Blues.

In 2026 the band toured both the USA and Europe to celebrate the 5 year anniversary of the album.

== Track listing ==
No.	Title	Length
1.	"Celestial Blues"	4:36
2.	"Morning Star"	3:53
3.	"Boghz"	5:23
4.	"Golgotha"	6:04
5.	"Coil"	3:01
6.	"Entwined"	6:04
7.	"Psychic Wound"	3:20
8.	"Ruse"	4:18
9.	"Paradise Lost"	4:10
Total length:		40:52

== Personnel ==
=== Musicians ===
- Kristina Esfandiari – vocals, rhythm guitar
- Peter Arensdorf – lead guitar, bass
- Joey Raygoza – drums

=== Production ===
- Kristina Esfandiari – sound design, production
- Jack Shirley – engineer, mixing, mastering
- Nedda Afsari – photography
