= Boduf Songs =

English electro-acoustic musician

Boduf Songs is the stage name of Southampton electro-acoustic musician Mat Christian Sweet.

Sweet first began recording as Boduf Songs in 2004, using field recordings in addition to recordings he made at home. He self-released these as a CD-R and Kranky Records reissued the album in 2005. Three further albums followed on Kranky. In 2013 he moved to Southern Records for his fifth full-length; a sixth, on Flenser Records, followed in 2015.

== Discography ==
- Boduf Songs (Kranky Records, 2005)
- Lion Devours the Sun (Kranky Records, 2006)
- How Shadows Chase the Balance (Kranky Records, 2008)
- This Alone Above All Else in Spite of Everything (Kranky Records, 2010)
- Burnt Up on Re-Entry (Southern Records, 2013)
- Stench of Exist (Flenser Records, 2015)
- Abyss Versions (Orindal Records, 2019)
