= Father Murphy (band) =

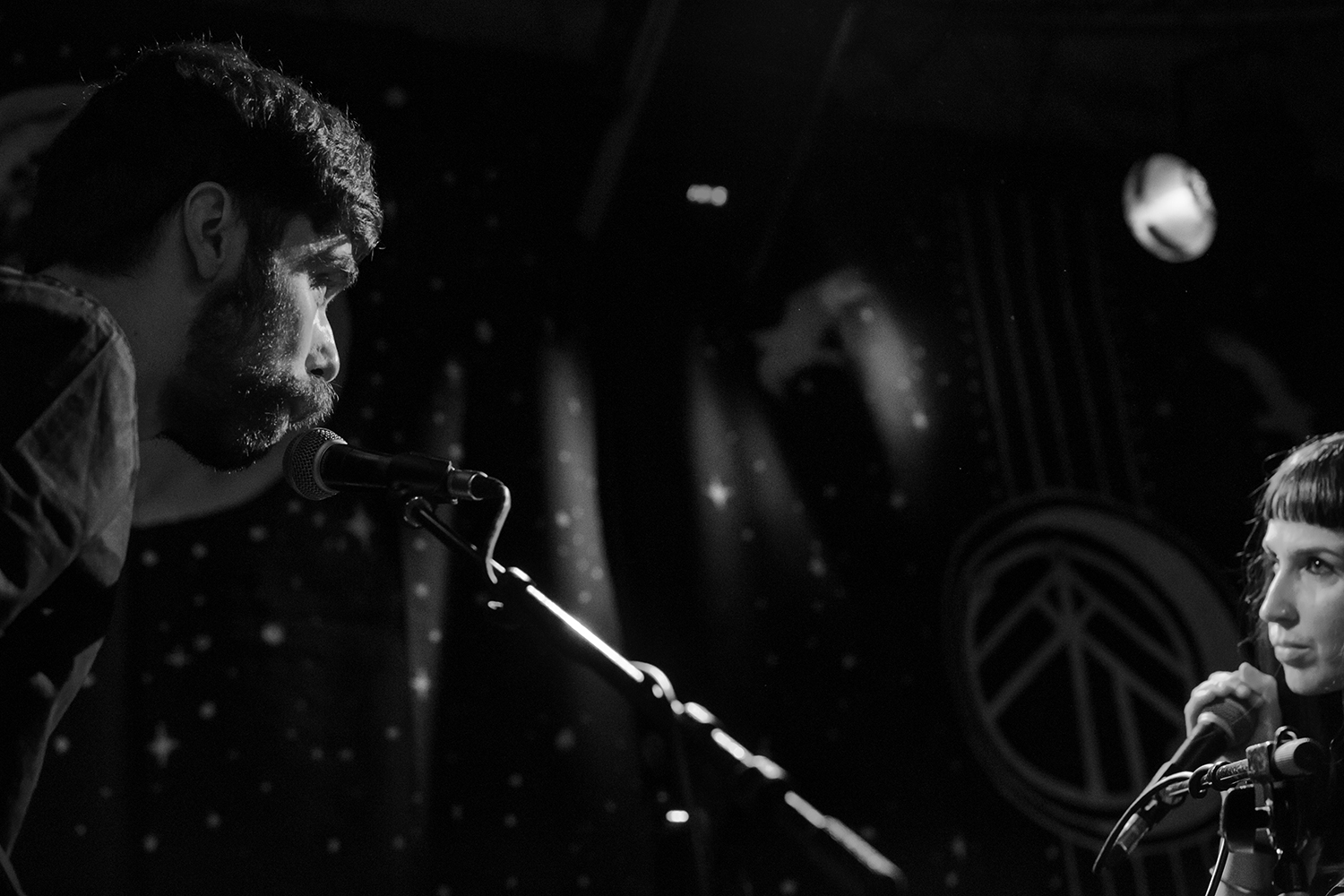
Father Murphy at Treefort Music Fest in 2015

Father Murphy was an avant-garde modern psychedelic band, part of the subgenre defined Italian occult psychedelia by Antonio Ciarletta.

== Biography ==
The band emerged from the partnership of Federico Zanatta (Freddie Murphy), Chiara Lee, and former drummer Vittorio Demarin.

Their first album, eponymously titled, came out from Madcap Collective, one of whose founders was Zanatta. Father Murphy's second album Six Musicians Getting Unknown came out in 2005 also on Madcap Collective.

The 2008 release of ... and He told us to turn to the Sun (Agoo Records, USA, and Boring Machines, Italy) signaled a sudden change in the band's style and an increase in touring. The EP No Room for the Weak came out the same year, also from Aagoo and Boring Machines.

In 2010 the band toured North America with Deerhoof and Xiu Xiu, and in 2012 they released a split EP with Xiu Xiu and toured North America with them and Dirty Beaches.

In 2014, Father Murphy started touring with artist and animator Luca Dipierro, performing a live soundtrack to the screening of his animated short films. The show, called Paper Circus, has been presented in various cinemas and galleries across the USA, like the Hollywood Theatre in Portland, OR, Cinefamily at The Silent Movie Theatre in LA, the Grand Illusion Cinema in Seattle, WA, Spectacle Theater and Millennium Film Workshop in Brooklyn, NY.

In 2015 the band released the Trilogy of the Cross, comprising Calvary (Blue Tapes, U.K.), Croce (The Flenser, U.S.A.) and Lamentations (Backwards Records, Italy).

In 2017 the duo released a collaboration EP with Jarboe, followed by two tours in Europe, one in the Fall and one in Spring 2018 that included Roadburn Festival, one in North America, and a special show at Dark Mofo in Australia.

The band released an album in 2018, Rising. A Requiem for Father Murphy. for Ramp Local and Avant! Records. On the top inside cover is written "Father Murphy 2001 - 2018".

Rising. A Requiem for Father Murphy. was included in essential releases of the week by Bandcamp and in daily discovery by Spotify.

== Members ==
- Freddie Murphy – vocals, guitar (2001–present)
- Chiara Lee – keyboards, vocals, percussion (2001–present)

== Former members ==
- Vittorio "GVitron" Demarin – drums, percussion (2001–2013)

== Discography ==
=== Albums ===
- 2003 Father Murphy (CD EP, Madcap Collective)
- 2005 Six Musicians Getting Unknown (CD album, Madcap Collective)
- 2008 ...And He Told Us To Turn To The Sun (CD/LP album, Aagoo Records/Boring Machines)
- 2011 Do The Sinister (CD collection, Box 13)
- 2012 Anyway, Your Children Will Deny It (CD/LP album, Aagoo Records)
- 2015 Croce (CD/LP/tape, The Flenser)
- 2018 Rising. A Requiem for Father Murphy (CD/2xLP album, Avant!/Ramp Local)

=== Singles and EPs ===
- 2010 No Room For The Weak (10", CD, Aagoo Records/Boring Machines)
- 2014 Pain Is On Our Side Now (2x10", Aagoo Records/Boring Machines, No-fi Recordings)
- 2015 Lamentations (10", Backwards)

=== Album Splits ===
- 2004 When We Were Young The World Wasn't In Your Hands (split with Mrs France, Madcap Collective)
- 2006 When Ground Figures Bless In Black Tutus (split with Lorenzo Fragiacomo, CD, Madcap Collective)
- 2011 Split (split with how much wood would a woodchuck chuck if a woodchuck could chuck wood?, 7", Aagoo Records, Avant!Records, Boring Machines, Brigadisco, La Dèlirante, Madcap Collective)
- 2012 I Luv Abortion / In The Flood With The Flood (split with Xiu Xiu, 7", Aagoo)

=== Compilations ===
- 2007 Jardim Elétrico: A Tribute To Os Mutantes, with the song Ave Lúcifer (CD, Madcap Collective)
- 2009 Rare Or Not Mix 3, with the song We Were Colonists (File MP3, self-produced)
- 2010 OCCII Compilation, A Mix Of Snippets 2002–2009, with the song Go Sinister (CDr, produced by OCCII)
- 2011 Free Music Impulse, with the song You Got Worry (2xCD, Hybryda)
