= Rlyr =

American post-rock band

RLYR is an American post-rock band from Chicago, composed of members of the groups Locrian, Pelican, and Russian Circles.

== History ==
RLYR was formed by Trevor Shelley de Brauw of Pelican, Steven Hess of Locrian, and Colin DeKuiper, of the bands Russian Circles and Bloodiest. They began playing together when Hess and de Brauw were asked to play as an improvisational duo in Milwaukee; finding they had musical common ground, they recruited DeKuiper to form an instrumental trio. The group took its name from the 1975 Yes album, Relayer. Their debut full-length album, Delayer, was released June 17, 2016 via Magic Bullet Records.

== Members ==
- Trevor Shelley de Brauw - guitar
- Steven Hess - drums
- Colin DeKuiper - bass

== Discography ==
- Delayer (Magic Bullet Records, 2016)
- Actual Existence (The Flenser, 2018)
- RLYR (Gilead Media, 2022)
