= Botanist (band) =

American black metal band

- Origin: San Francisco, California, U.S.
- Genres: Black metal; avant-garde metal; post-metal
- Years active: 2009–present
- Labels: The Flenser, Totalrust Music
- Members: Otrebor; Daturus; Tony Thomas
- Website: botanist.nu

Botanist is an American black metal band based in San Francisco, originally formed as a one-man project by musician Otrebor, with later collaborations with other musicians. The band has been described as a "Guitarless, environmentally themed 'green metal' project utilizing hammered dulcimer, sung from the perspective of a reclusive, nature-loving misanthrope." Most of the band's lyrics are based on environmental themes and botanical processes, with a focus on climate change and destruction of the natural world.

== Description ==
In a departure from traditional black metal instrumentation, Botanist uses distorted hammered dulcimers instead of standard electric guitars, and with more clean vocals than most black metal music. Critics have noted the evolution of unconventional instrumentation over the course of the band's history.

Otrebor originally played all instruments himself with no editing. Otrebor claims that when writing songs and recording, he channels an entity called "The Botanist" who holds a "romantic worldview in which plants reclaim the earth after humanity has killed itself," and who is "trying his damnedest to bring about the end of humanity because humanity is destroying the natural world and the natural world must prevail."

The band's sound is largely influenced by Ulver, which Otrebor describes as "black metal that's grown out of the worship of the forest." Otrebor's use of scientific terms for plants and insects in lyrics and song titles is a tribute to the extreme metal band Carcass. Other influences include artists in a wide range of heavy metal genres, plus ambient and classical musicians, including The Ruins of Beverast, Stars of the Lid, Immortal, Pagan's Mind, Antonio Vivaldi, Johann Sebastian Bach, Arvo Pärt, Edenbridge, Helloween, Angra, Martyr, and Bolt Thrower.

Botanist received spotlight coverage from NPR, in which journalist Lars Gotrich praised the albums I: The Suicide Tree and II: A Rose from the Dead as "surprisingly dynamic and hypnotic. The hammered dulcimer rings out and cuts like a blast-beated piano pounding paradiddles in some kind of black-metal drumline. [...] Botanist has created an alternate world where black-metal tropes — buzzing sound, croaked vocals, bleak aesthetics — exist, but are sonically limitless." Decibel magazine has called the band's music "emotionally devastating."

== Band members ==
Botanist has existed mainly as a one-man project in the studio, however various lineups have been assembled for touring and collaborative albums. Otrebor first recorded with a full band in 2017.

=== Current members ===
- Otrebor – vocals, drums, hammered dulcimer (2009–present)
- Daturus (2017–present) – drums
- Tony Thomas (2019–present) – bass

=== Former members ===
- D. Neal – hammered dulcimer (2013–2016)
- A. Lindo – vocals, harmonium (2013–2016)
- R. Chiang – hammered dulcimer (2013–2016)
- Balan – bass (2013–2016)
- Toorpand – bass (2017–2018)
- Cynoxylon – vocals (2017–2019)
- Davide Tiso – bass (2018–2019)

== Discography ==
- I: The Suicide Tree (2011)
- II: A Rose From the Dead (2011)
- III: Doom in Bloom (2012)
- IV: Mandragora (2013)
- The Hanging Gardens of Hell (EP split with Palace of Worms, 2013)
- VI: Flora (2014)
- EP2: Hammer of Botany (2015)
- EP3: Green Metal (2016)
- Collective: The Shape Of He To Come (2017)
- Collective: Setlist (2017)
- Ecosystem (2019)
- Photosynthesis (2020)
- VIII: Selenotrope (2023)
- Paleobotany (2024)
- VII: Beast of Arpocalyx (2024)
