= III (Bosse-de-Nage album) =

Studio album by Bosse-de-Nage
- Released: June 26, 2012
- Genre: Black metal; blackgaze; math rock
- Length: 46:12
- Label: Profound Lore

Bosse-de-Nage chronology
II (2011)	III (2012)	Deafheaven / Bosse-de-Nage (2012)

III is the third studio album by American black metal band Bosse-de-Nage, released on June 26, 2012. It is the band's first album on Profound Lore Records. The album features a cross between black metal and math rock styles, with elements from various genres such as shoegaze, post-hardcore, screamo, and indie rock. The album's sound was also compared to various music acts such as Slint, Mogwai, Godspeed You! Black Emperor, Deathspell Omega and Blut Aus Nord.

== Critical reception ==
Professional ratings
Review scores
Source	Rating
Pitchfork	7.9/10
PopMatters	8/10
Spin	7/10

The album generally received positive reviews from music critics. Pitchfork critic Kim Kelly described the record as "an intense listen, and a wholly cathartic one as well," and further explained: "There are plenty of moments of outright aggression, bleak, harrowing passages of unrelenting blasts, narrated by a chaotic, urgent voice that veers between angry wails and sparse, Slint-like sotto voce intonations depending on the lyrical bent." PopMatters' Craig Haynes regarded the album as the band's "chef-d’œuvre." Haynes also stated: "Merging melodic elegance with blackened rancor might seem on paper to be an incongruent mix. But the longer you listen, the more it all makes perfect, albeit idiosyncratic, sense – admirably reflecting the conflict and confusion of life itself." Christopher R. Weingarten of Spin described the album as "a circling Venn diagram where math rock and black metal meet" and "more bleak shame-spiral than Liturgical transcendence."

== Personnel ==
Bosse-de-Nage

- D. – bass guitar
- H. (Harry Cantwell) – drums
- B. (Bryan Manning) – vocals
- M. – guitar

Other personnel

- Justin Weis – mixing
- Astrid J. Smith – artwork

== Track listing ==
No.	Title	Length
1.	"The Arborist"	6:18
2.	"Desuetude"	7:29
3.	"Perceive There a Silence"	6:53
4.	"Cells"	5:41
5.	"The God Ennui"	10:26
6.	"An Ideal Ledge"	9:21
