= Plastic Flowers =

Greek songwriter

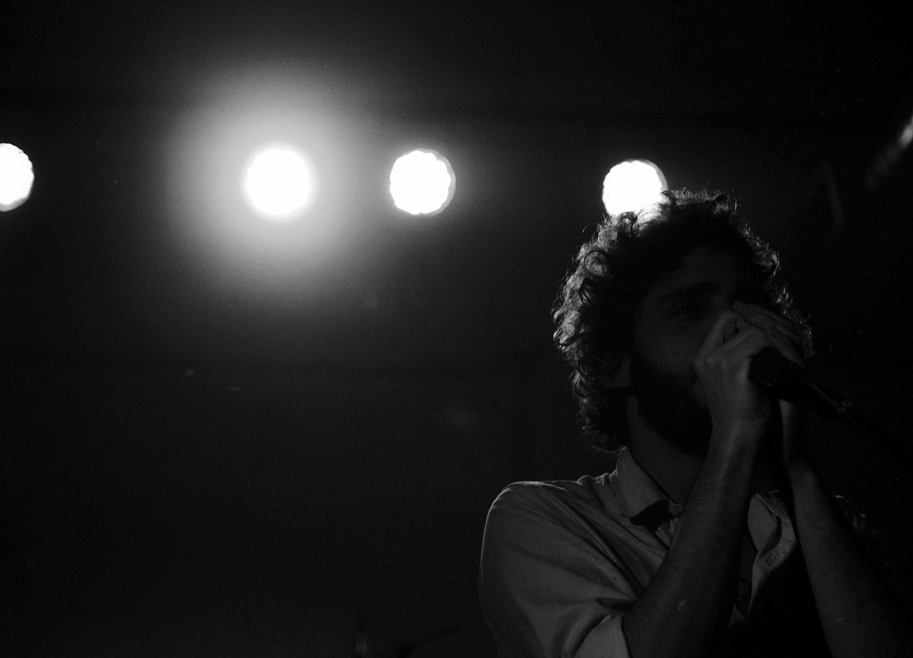
- Plastic Flowers live in Berlin, 2014
- Born: Georgios Samaras; Thessaloniki, Greece
- Education: Aristotle University of Thessaloniki (BA); King's College London (MA, PhD)
- Notable work: Evergreen (2014); Heavenly (2016); Absent Forever (2017)
- Style: Dream pop, electronic, experimental
- Website: gsamaras.io

Georgios Samaras, better known as Plastic Flowers, is a Greek songwriter and academic at King's College London, who has released three full-length studio albums: Evergreen in 2014, Heavenly in 2016 and Absent Forever in 2017.

== Career ==
Georgios started recording music on a TASCAM Multi-track and released a series of bedroom pop influenced EPs that have received praise for their lo-fi touch.

In 2014 his debut album Evergreen was released through Inner Ear Records, and Crash Symbols in Europe and the United States respectively. He later moved to London and recorded his second full-length album Heavenly in November 2015, and Absent Forever in 2017, both released via The Native Sound and distributed by Warner.

He became the first Greek act ever to perform at South by Southwest. He has also toured USA and Europe and performed live at the Royal Academy of Arts, Fun Fun Fun Fest, Stavros Niarchos Foundation Cultural Center, Athens Concert Hall and Thessaloniki Concert Hall, and shared the stage with Bonobo, A.R.Kane, Emancipator, Still Corners and others.

On his debut album Evergreen he collaborated with Keep Shelly in Athens and NY-based artist and painter Ed Askew, who also painted the album cover for Heavenly.

=== Theodoros Pangalos Sample ===
In 2012, Plastic Flowers sampled Theodoros Pangalos' controversial ministerial statement "We [government and citizens] fooled away the money together" in Sinking Ship/Vanished Crew.

== Academia ==
He is an Assistant Professor of Public Policy at King's College London. As an undergraduate studying German at Aristotle University of Thessaloniki between 2009 and 2014, Samaras read modern and contemporary literature. He later obtained a Master's degree in Education Policy, and a PhD both from King's College London, where he investigated the rise of far-right extremism in Greece during the fiscal crisis. He often contributes to Greek newspapers Kathimerini and Efimerida ton Syntakton, and Euronews.

In June 2020, during the Black Lives Matter protests in London, he started a campaign against a local school in West Hampstead, named after slaver William Beckford. The campaign received coverage from national and local media, and support from British actress Emma Thompson resulting in a name change.

== Discography ==
=== LPs ===
- Evergreen (2014, Inner Ear Records – Crash Symbols)
- Heavenly (2016, The Native Sound – Track & Field Records)
- Absent Forever (2017, The Native Sound – Distributed by Warner-ADA)

=== EPs and singles ===
- Meltdown EP (2011, Cakes and Tapes)
- White Walls Painted Black – Single (2011, Cakes and Tapes)
- Natural Conspiracy EP (2012, Cakes and Tapes)
- Empty Eyes – Single (2012, Bad Panda Records)
- In You I'm Lost – Single (2012, self-released)
- Aftermath EP (2013, Manic Pop Records)
- Fog Song/Silence – Double 7" (2013, Manic Pop Records)
- Now She's Gone – Single (2014, self-released)
- Summer of 1992 EP (2015, self-released)
- Falling Off – Single 7" (2016, The Native Sound)
- Plastic Flowers - Live at Megaron Mousikis (2023, self-released)
