= King Woman =

American heavy metal band

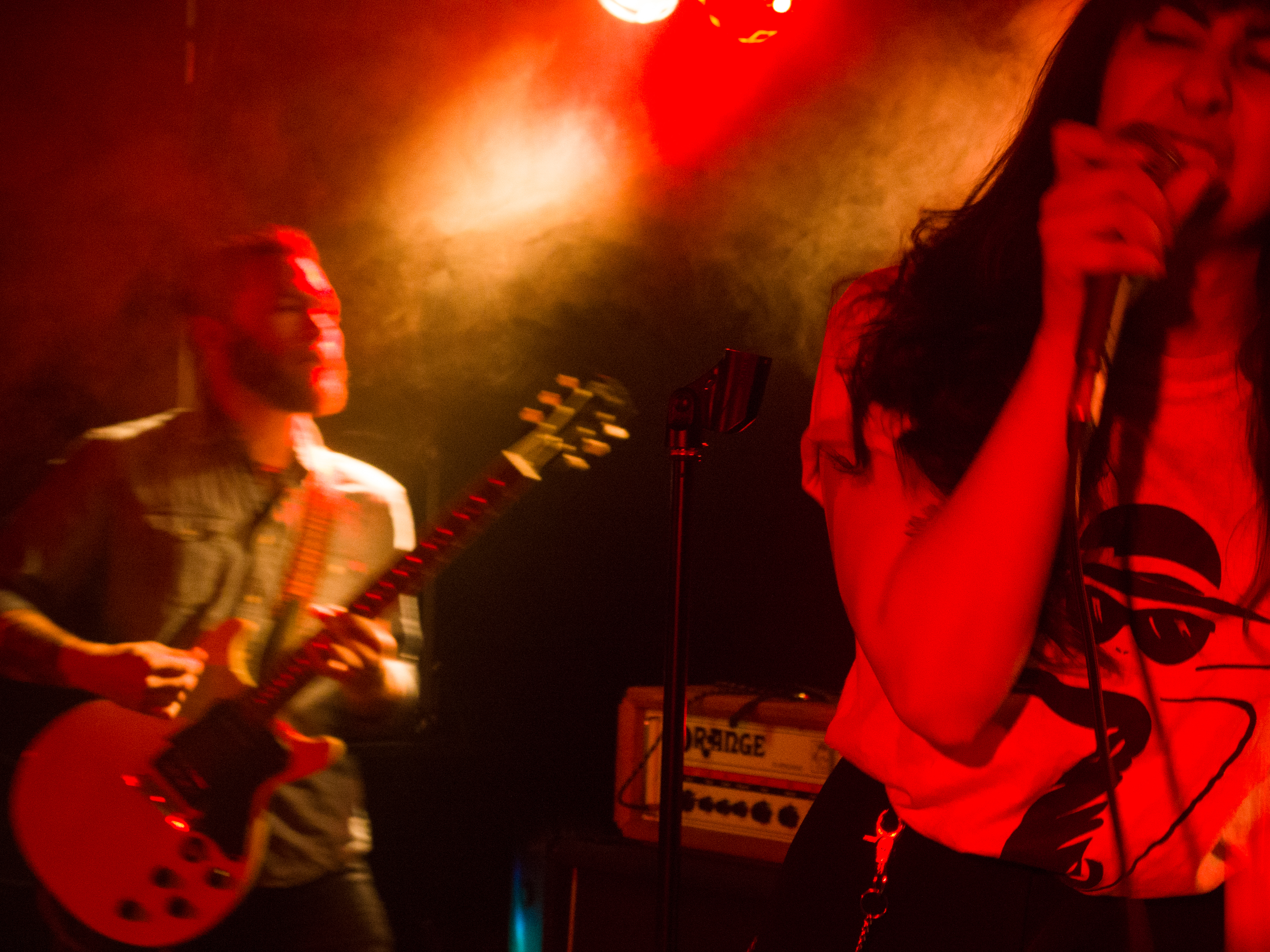
- Colin Gallagher (L) and Kristina Esfandiari performing live in 2017.

Background information
- Origin: San Francisco, California
- Genres: Doom metal
- Years active: 2009–present
- Members: Kristina Esfandiari; Joey Raygoza; Peter Arensdorf
- Past members: Colin Gallagher; Patrick Hills; Sky Madden

King Woman is an American doom metal band from San Francisco, California, formed by singer/guitarist Kristina Esfandiari. The band's lyrics largely address Esfandiari's childhood years in a cult-like charismatic Christian community in Northern California. The band has released two albums in between several of Esfandiari's other projects in disparate genres.

== History ==
Esfandiari first formed King Woman in 2009 as a solo project, in addition to her work fronting several other bands, Due to her commitments elsewhere, the first King Woman release did not occur until 2013. The single "Degrida/Sick Bed" featured musical support from Jess Labrador of the bands Tied to the Branches and Chasms. Esfandiari positioned King Woman in the doom metal genre to emphasize the often disturbing lyrics about her childhood religious experiences. According to one journalist who assessed the lyrics, "Esfandiari has lived through hell, and came out swinging a microphone cord." Others noted the influence of feminism in Esfandiari's examinations of religion, and a focus on the status of women in the heavy metal community.

Esfandiari expanded King Woman into a full band with guitarist Colin Gallagher, bassist Peter Arensdorf, and drummer Joey Raygoza. This lineup released the EP Doubt in 2015, and began regularly playing live in the San Francisco Bay area. The band had two bases of operations after Esfandiari moved to Brooklyn, New York before the release of their first album. During this period, King Woman toured as the opening act for Pentagram, but attracted news coverage by publicly pulling out of the tour due to inappropriate behavior by Pentagram leader Bobby Liebling.

The band signed with Relapse Records in 2016, and their first full-length album Created in the Image of Suffering was released in 2017. Reviewers noted how the band mixed doom metal with shoegaze and sludge rock sounds. Several music journalists named the album as one of the best heavy metal albums of the year. Esfandiari maintained the career of King Woman concurrently with other projects that also released new music during this period, such as the rap-oriented project Dalmatian and the shoegaze act Miserable.

Guitarist Gallagher left the band before their second album, and Arensdorf played both bass and lead guitar on their next release. Their second album Celestial Blues was released in 2021, and expanded the band's sound with experiments in grunge and post-rock. That album's lyrics were noted by journalists for being more positive than those in the band's previous works, with a focus on transcending one's childhood traumas. The band's output then became more sporadic as Esfandiari focused on other projects, but a stand-alone single titled "Bury" was released in 2024.

== Members ==
Current members

- Kristina Esfandiari – lead vocals (2009–present)
- Joey Raygoza – drums (2014–present)
- Peter Arensdorf – bass (2016–present), guitars (2019–present)

Former members

- Colin Gallagher – guitars (2014–2021)
- Patrick Hills – guitars (2014–2015)
- Sky Madden – bass (2014–2016)

== Discography ==
=== Albums ===
- Doubt (EP, 2015)
- Created in the Image of Suffering (2017)
- Celestial Blues (2021)
