= Yume Nikki: Dream Diary =

2018 video game

- Steam artwork
- Developer: Kadokawa Games
- Publisher: Playism
- Platforms: Windows; Nintendo Switch
- Release: Windows; February 23, 2018; Switch; February 21, 2019
- Genre: Adventure
- Mode: Single-player

Yume Nikki: Dream Diary is a 2018 horror-themed adventure game developed by Kadokawa Games and published by Playism. It is a reboot of the 2004 indie game Yume Nikki and was produced with supervision from the original game's creator, Kikiyama. The game borrows basic elements, such as some abandoned design concepts, from its predecessor, but also contains significant changes. As in Yume Nikki, the player controls a girl named Madotsuki from a third-person perspective and explores worlds inside her dreams. Dream Diary adds platforming and puzzle gameplay, and the game is rendered in 3D.

Dream Diary was released on Windows on February 23, 2018, and received mixed reviews from critics, who complimented the visuals, music, and atmosphere, but criticized its gameplay. In general, they felt that it was an upgrade in some ways but was missing significant factors in the appeal of the original game. It received a Nintendo Switch release in 2019.

== Gameplay ==
Madotsuki (right) in a room with two NPCs

A reboot of the 2004 game Yume Nikki, Yume Nikki: Dream Diary is structurally similar to and borrows some environments from the original. It is an adventure game focused on atmosphere and exploration. Unlike its predecessor, Dream Diary is rendered in 3D and includes areas with puzzles and platforming. Some sections are seen from overhead and some have a 2.5D perspective. The player controls a hikikomori named Madotsuki, who is seen waking from a dream at the start of the game. In Madotsuki's apartment, which can not be exited while she is awake, there is a game console the player can use to play a minigame and a dream diary that keeps track of the player's progress and collectibles.

The player can make Madotsuki sleep, which transports them inside her dreams to a room with eight doors, six that lead to new worlds, one that leads back to the real world, and one that can only be opened after the six worlds are finished. Inside these worlds, the player can collect items called Effects, which can help the player progress or unlock secrets. Throughout the game Madotsuki, who cannot fight, can encounter creatures, some of whom are hostile, and some of whom serve as obstacles the player must move. Each world has loosely defined goals and ends with a cutscene, after which Madotsuki wakes up again. The player can also force Madotsuki to wake up at any time.

Dream Diary has a minimal plot, although some cutscenes contain story elements, and the game has two endings. The first requires the player to complete all six dream worlds to open a seventh door, which leads to a platforming sequence in which Madotsuki is chased. If the player escapes to Madotsuki's apartment, a cutscene shows her waking up, looking out from the balcony, and then leaving her apartment. The second ending further requires the player to collect a special item from each world after completing the game. After collecting all of them, the player can access a spaceship, where Madotsuki can play a song with a character named Seccom Masada. After playing the song, he will open a room with a bed in which Madotsuki falls asleep.

== Development and release ==
Dream Diary's predecessor, Yume Nikki, was created independently and released as freeware in June 2004 by a Japanese developer using the pseudonym Kikiyama. After 2011, there was no update from Kikiyama until Yume Nikki was published on Steam by Playism in January 2018. Concurrent with the Steam release, a two-week countdown began on the Kadokawa Corporation website, accompanied by a message indicating an unspecified Yume Nikki project was being produced. After the countdown finished, Dream Diary was revealed to be in development by Kadokawa and Active Gaming Media, and a release date of February 23, 2018 was given. Playism announced that the game's development had supervision and cooperation from Kikiyama. Dream Diary incorporated references to and abandoned design concepts from the original game, as well as influences from contemporary indie games. Shortly before the game's release, Playism announced it would feature a collaboration with Ao Oni, another freeware horror game. Dream Diary was released for Windows on February 23, 2018 On May 25, 2018, it received a major update containing new areas and content, as well as fixes to address technical bugs which had negatively affected early reactions to the game. The game released on Nintendo Switch on February 21, 2019.

== Reception ==
Reception

Aggregate score
Aggregator	Score
Metacritic	51/100

Review scores
Publication	Score
Adventure Gamers	2.5/5
Famitsu	7/10, 7/10, 7/10, 7/10
MeriStation	3.5/10
Hardcore Gamer	2.5/5
TechTudo	7.5/10

Yume Nikki: Dream Diary received a score of 51/100 on review aggregate site Metacritic, indicating "mixed or average reviews". Some critics compared the game with its predecessor—Rock Paper Shotgun's Adam Smith felt that Dream Diary had lost the "mysterious horror and charm" of the original game and called it "fan-disservice", and Adventure Gamers' Kevin Lynn said it introduced adventure platformer tropes while discarding the distinct, open-ended design of Yume Nikki. Tais Carvalho of TechTudo thought the introduction of more traditional gameplay elements had positive and negative effects, and that it made the game more accessible than the original to a general audience; however, Lynn said the game's new 3D visuals were a faithful translation of the original 2D textures.

The game's presentation was generally well received by critics, with Carvalho and Hardcore Gamer's Chris Shive calling the visuals one of the best aspects of the game. Rubén Martínez of MeriStation noted that they did not think the game looked ugly, but called its visual style one of its worst aspects because they felt the pixel art style of the original was the source of a lot of its mystery. Reception to the world design was mixed. Smith compared the re-imagined designs to "bootleg DVD covers", and Shive complimented the creature designs. Shive felt they were unsettling and captured the "chaotic and random" feel of dreams, but criticized them for being too linear. Lynn praised the game's atmosphere. The game's music was received positively; Lynn identified it as a strong point, helping contribute to a "lonely, haunting tone", while Carvalho and Martínez thought it was one of the game's best aspects, helping enhance the game's horror and atmosphere.

The gameplay was generally criticized. Smith said it was clunky and confusing at points, while Martínez and Carvalho criticized a number of glitches. Lynn found the controls mostly responsive, but criticized one section of 3D platforming for its camera and physics. Shive thought that, despite the interesting premise and strong visuals, the game was overall not enjoyable to play, citing linear world layouts and weak puzzles as contributing factors. Lynn also added that, despite the game having a good variety of worlds, they lost their impact due to excessive backtracking and the game's animations became "tiresome".
