= Panopticon (band) =

American black metal band

- Origin: Louisville, Kentucky, U.S.
- Genres: Black metal, art metal, folk, Americana
- Years active: 2007–present
- Members: Austin Lunn

Panopticon is an American black metal band founded by Austin Lunn in Louisville, Kentucky in 2007. The band has been described as "wrenching in its intensity but also sweeping and spectacular" and "ideologically open-minded and musically progressive, tackling issues around self-identity, ecology, religion and politics." Lunn's lyrics are "natural, organic, and methodical, masterful in its writing, fiery and alive in its execution."

== History ==
The project began as a studio-only effort. Lunn wrote all songs and played all instruments. A self-titled debut album was released in 2008. While Lunn remains the sole songwriter and studio musician, Panopticon has expanded to include live musicians. The project's sound has been characterized as black metal with influences from bluegrass and Appalachian folk, with Appalachian instruments such as banjo, fiddle, bells, and acoustic guitar. Lunn's lyrics reference environmentalist philosophers and proponents of anarchism. He has tackled topics like the foster care system, Native American subjugation, and blue-collar labor policy.

Several music publications noted the 2012 album Kentucky for including musical traditions from Lunn's home state. The album included lyrics based on issues faced by that state's residents, such as the coal industry. The 2015 album Autumn Eternal included guest appearances by regional folk musicians. Lunn's interests as an outdoorsman and nature lover informed that album. Pitchfork noted that "one can easily imagine a Henry David Thoreau-like figure retreating to the woods to contemplate personal, spiritual, and environmental concerns." Pitchfork named Autumn Eternal one of the best heavy metal albums of 2015.

The band first played live in 2016, with Lunn on guitar and vocals. Drummer Ray Capizzo, bassist Andy Klokow, and guitarist Jake Quittschreiber accompanied him. The 2018 double album The Scars of Man on the Once Nameless Wilderness received attention for integrating country and folk music with traditional black metal. The 2021 album ...And Again into the Light was noted for integrating Lunn's songwriting interests into a cohesive sound, with personal and family-oriented lyrics that are unusual in black metal. Decibel ranked ...And Again into the Light at number five on its list of the "Top 40 Albums of 2021". Rolling Stone named it the tenth best metal album of 2021.

On June 12, 2025, the band announced they would release a compilation album and a studio album on August 15: Songs of Hiraeth, a black metal album, and Laurentian Blue, a folk album.

On March 25, 2026, the band premiered two tracks from their forthcoming studio album Det Hjemsøkte Hjertet (Norwegian for "The Haunted Heart"), released on May 8 of that year. Det Hjemsøkte Hjertet is the last part of the Laurentian Trilogy, following ...And Again into the Light and The Rime of Memory. The album explores cultural erosion, memory, and mortality through the eyes of a fictional Minnesota's Arrowhead hermit. The album has been noted for its prominent use of strings compared to traditional black metal, with cellos, violins, and violas alongside traditional black metal instrumentation. Reviewers praised the album's emotional depth, described it as a "meticulously crafted eulogy for a world that is no longer ours", and claimed that it is the "crowning jewel" of the trilogy.

== Discography ==
=== Studio albums ===
- Panopticon (2008)
- Collapse (2009)
- On the Subject of Mortality (2010)
- Social Disservices (2011)
- Kentucky (2012)
- Roads to the North (2014)
- Autumn Eternal (2015)
- The Scars of Man on the Once Nameless Wilderness (2018)
- ...And Again into the Light (2021)
- The Rime of Memory (2023)
- Laurentian Blue (2025)
- Det Hjemsøkte Hjertet (2026)

=== Live albums ===
- ...Scars II (The Basics) (2019)
- Live Migration (2020)

=== EPs ===
- The Crescendo of Dusk (2019)
- Beast Rider (2020)
- The Poppies Bloom For No King (2025)

=== Compilations ===
- Revisions of the Past (2016)
- Songs of Hiraeth (2025)

=== Splits ===
- It's Later Than You Think (Wheels Within Wheels, 2009)
- Lake of Blood/Panopticon (Lake of Blood, 2009)
- Panopticon/When Bitter Spring Sleeps (When Bitter Spring Sleeps, 2010)
- Skagos/Panopticon (Skagos, 2010)
- Wheels Within Wheels/Panopticon II (Wheels Within Wheels, 2011)
- Vestiges/Panopticon (Vestiges, 2013)
- Brotherhood (Falls of Rauros, 2014)
- Panopticon/Waldgeflüster (Waldgeflüster, 2016)
- Panopticon/Aerial Ruin (Aerial Ruin, 2020)
- Panopticon/Nechochwen (Nechochwen, 2020)
