= The Native Sound =

- Founded: 2013
- Founder: Julio Anta
- Distributor: ADA (Warner Music Group)
- Genre: Dream pop, shoegazing, folk, indie
- Country of origin: U.S.
- Location: New York City
- Official website: www.thenativesound.com

The Native Sound is an independent record label based in New York City. It was founded in 2013 by Julio Anta. The label has released a number of dream pop, shoegaze and folk music releases on cassette tape, limited edition vinyl, and digital download. The label's roster includes John Vanderslice, Andrew Koji Shiraki, Miserable, King Woman, Funeral Advantage, Plastic Flowers, Sheer, Drowse and Vow.

== Discography ==
The Native Sound Discography
Cat#	Released	Album title	Artist(s)
NATIVE 001	August 13, 2013	Song For Clay Miller / Vitas At Wimbledon	John Vanderslice
NATIVE 002	November 12, 2013	Matters EP	Andrew Koji Shiraki
NATIVE 003	February 18, 2014	Halloween Dream EP	Miserable
NATIVE 004	April 8, 2014	Pool Jealousy	Divino Niño
NATIVE 005	February 25, 2014	Destitution	Grey Zine
NATIVE 006	June 3, 2014	Scorched	Mother Room
NATIVE 007	June 17, 2014	Dove / Fond Affections	King Woman
NATIVE 008	August 12, 2014	Make Me Yours EP	Vow
NATIVE 009	February 24, 2015	Split	Threading / Unconditional Arms
NATIVE 010	July 21, 2015	Split	Planning for Burial / Mother Room
NATIVE 011	April 14, 2015	Split	Former Ghosts / Funeral Advantage
NATIVE 012	February 18, 2015	Not In My House / That's That	Funeral Advantage
NATIVE 013	September 4, 2015	Halloween Dream (Demos)	Miserable
NATIVE 014	May 19, 2015	Midnight Blue / Long Dark Blues	John Vanderslice
NATIVE 015	August 28, 2015	Body is Dead	Funeral Advantage
NATIVE 016	August 29, 2015	Body is Dead (Demos)	Funeral Advantage
NATIVE 017	August 21, 2015	Imago	Lost Film
NATIVE 018	October 28, 2015	You are Never Enough EP	Threading
NATIVE 019	December 11, 2015	Split	Mother Room / Teal
NATIVE 020	October 23, 2015	Live at Santo	Unconditional Arms
NATIVE 021	November 6, 2015	Give Me Your Bones EP	New Manners
NATIVE 022	November 20, 2015	Uneasy	Sheer
NATIVE 023	January 22, 2016	The Light	FVNERALS
NATIVE 024	January 6, 2016	Temporary EP	Lost Film
NATIVE 025	May 13, 2016	The Shady Sexyfornia Tapes	Divino Niño
NATIVE 026	May 27, 2016	Kind Eyes	Vow
NATIVE 027	April 22, 2016	Heavenly	Plastic Flowers
NATIVE 028	April 29, 2016	Uncontrollable	Miserable
NATIVE 029	July 22, 2016	Growth EP	O.C.D.
NATIVE 030	August 5, 2016	Memory Bed EP	Drowse
NATIVE 031	October 14, 2016	Wounds	FVNERALS
NATIVE 032	September 9, 2016	Don't Let It Die	Divino Niño
NATIVE 033	January 20, 2017	If Only	No Sun
NATIVE 034	February 24, 2017	Please Help Me EP	Funeral Advantage
NATIVE 035	April 28, 2017	Psycich Quarry EP	Sheer
NATIVE 036	February 17, 2017	Nazi Punks Fuck Off	No Sun
NATIVE 037	March 24, 2017	Won't Be There	Luke Reed
NATIVE 038	October 6, 2017	We Have No Friends? EP	Surf Rock is Dead
NATIVE 039	November 15, 2017	Underwater	Tea Leigh & Luke Reed
NATIVE 040	September 1, 2017	Rips One Into the Night	Petite League
NATIVE 041	October 13, 2017	Chain Up the Sun	Neaux
NATIVE 043	November 10, 2017	Absent Forever	Plastic Flowers
NATIVE 044	June 28, 2018	Collages	June Pastel

Vinyl Reissue Series Discography
Cat#	Released	Album title	Artist(s)
NATIVE-RE 001	July 15, 2014	Some Small Way EP	Andrew Koji Shiraki
NATIVE-RE 002	May 19, 2015	Mass Suicide Occult Figurines	John Vanderslice
NATIVE-RE 003	January 27, 2017	Spring Song, Volume One	Andrew Koji Shiraki
NATIVE-RE 004	June 1, 2018	No Hitter	Petite League

"Private Press" Singles Series Discography
Cat#	Released	Album title	Artist(s)
NATIVE-PP 001	January 28, 2016	Withdraw	Vow
NATIVE-PP 002	February 9, 2016	Keeping Count	Andrew Koji Shiraki
NATIVE-PP 003	March 22, 2016	Silver Keys	Lost Film
NATIVE-PP 004	April 12, 2016	Eugene, OR	Grave School
NATIVE-PP 005	June 15, 2016	As A Lover	Planning for Burial
NATIVE-PP 006	July 29, 2016	Room	Sheer
NATIVE-PP 007	August 22, 2016	Aligning With The Sun	Dear Tracks
NATIVE-PP 008	September 29, 2016	Falling Off	Plastic Flowers
