= Bosse-de-Nage =

American experimental black metal band

- Origin: San Francisco, California, U.S.
- Genres: Post-black metal; blackgaze; screamo
- Labels: The Flenser; Profound Lore
- Members: D.; H.; B.; M.
- Website: bosse-de-nage.com

Bosse-de-Nage is an American black metal band from San Francisco, California, composed of four anonymous members. Considered a part of the blackgaze scene, their experimental style draws from post-rock, shoegaze, post-hardcore, screamo, and indie rock. The band's influences include the post-rock bands Slint, Mogwai, and Godspeed You! Black Emperor. AllMusic critic Gregory Heaney deemed their sound to be "as comfortable expanding outward as it is contracting into a suffocating mass of needling guitars and frantic drumming." Bosse-de-Nage's lyrics touch on subjects like sex, filth, bodies, perversion, and death. Their name is taken from French symbolist Alfred Jarry's book Exploits and Opinions of Dr. Faustroll, Pataphysician; it is the name of a monkey which may or may not have been a hallucination of the narrator.

== History ==
After releasing a set of demos in 2006, Bosse-de-Nage signed to The Flenser record label and released its self-titled debut album, which featured recordings from 2007, in 2010. The band's second album, II was released in 2011. The album caught Profound Lore Records' attention, which released their follow-up III' in 2012. In the same year, Bosse-de-Nage also released a split EP with fellow San Francisco-based black metal band Deafheaven, Deafheaven / Bosse-de-Nage, contributing the original track, "A Mimesis of Purpose."

The band released its fourth studio album, All Fours, in 2015. In 2018, the band returned to The Flenser for “Further Still”, its fifth album. Their sixth album, Hidden Fires Burn Hottest, is scheduled for release on March 6, 2026.

== Band members ==
- D. (Drew Bonel) – bass guitar
- H. (Harry Cantwell) – drums
- B. (Bryan Manning) – vocals
- M. (Michael Smith-Brenden) – guitar

== Discography ==
Studio albums

- Bosse-de-Nage (2010)
- II (2011)
- III (2012)
- All Fours (2015)
- Further Still (2018)
- Hidden Fires Burn Hottest (2026)

Splits

- Deafheaven / Bosse-de-Nage (2012, with Deafheaven)

Demos

- Demo I (2006)
- Demo II (2006)
