= Planning for Burial =

American musician

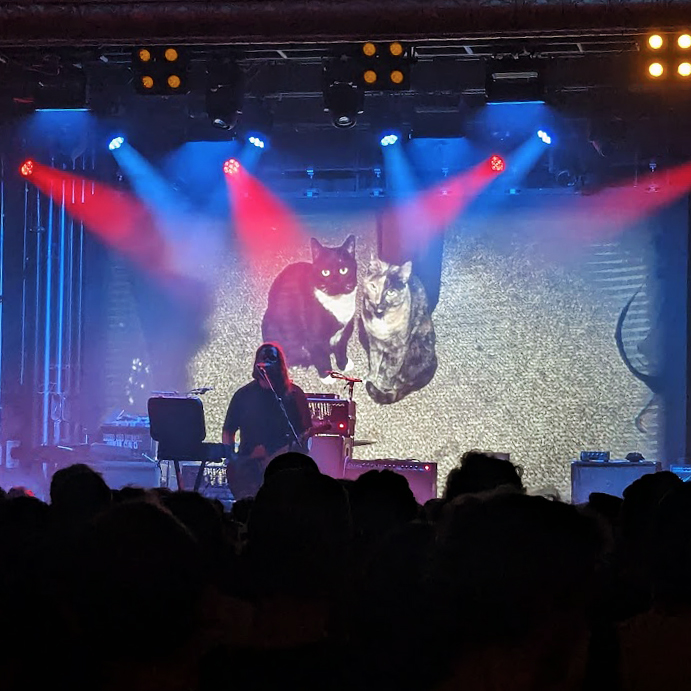
- Planning for Burial performing in Warsaw (September 2025)

Background information
- Also known as: How to Dress for Burial
- Origin: Matawan, New Jersey, United States
- Genres: Shoegaze; post-metal; ambient; gothic rock
- Years active: 2005–present
- Labels: Enemies List Home Recordings; Music Ruins Lives; Tycho Magnetic Anomalies; The Flenser; The Native Sound
- Members: Thom Wasluck
- Website: planningforburial.bandcamp.com

Planning for Burial is the musical project of American musician and singer-songwriter Thom Wasluck. Based in Wilkes-Barre, Pennsylvania, Wasluck started to perform as "Burial" in 2005 and released the debut album, Leaving in 2009. Wasluck plays all instruments during both his home recordings and live performances.

== History ==
Before performing as Planning for Burial, Wasluck played in local bands and recorded music with his 4 track recorder. In 2009, he released his debut album, Leaving, which was re-released by Enemies List Home Recordings in 2010. Following the re-release of the album, Wasluck recorded and released a series of tapes, EPs and splits in the following years.

In 2014, Planning for Burial released its second studio album, Desideratum, through the Flenser record label. In 2016, Planning for Burial released the As a Lover single through New York–based record label the Native Sound. Planning for Burial has shared the stage with a wide range of music acts, including Chelsea Wolfe, Have a Nice Life and Deafheaven.

== Musical style ==
Planning for Burial's music takes influences from a wide array of genres, and is labeled as "gloomgaze" and experimental metal. According to Pitchfork critic Andy O'Connor, Thom Wasluck of Planning for Burial "filters post-metal, doom, ambient, and goth-rock through his own terminally miserable lens". Vice described the band as "a fully-contained, one-man band who delves into shoegaze, metal, black metal and other elements to craft somber, emotional songs", and compared its style to those of English post-metal band Jesu. New Noise Magazine argued that the act's sound "contains elements of slowcore, shoegaze, doom, drone, '90s alt rock, '80s goth, and black metal, while never being defined by any one of those genres". Jason Cook of PopMatters also drew parallels between the band's debut studio album, Leaving, and Nine Inch Nails' 1999 album, The Fragile.

Wasluck releases Planning for Burial on various mediums, including on floppy disks and cassette tape.

== Discography ==
=== Albums ===
- Leaving (2009, re-released in 2010 by Enemies List Home Recordings)
- Quietly (2013, Enemies List)
- Desideratum (2014, The Flenser)
- Live on Radio in Opposition (2014)
- A Little Less Consistent (2015)
- Below the House (2017, The Flenser)
- 22 June 2018, Mostly Quiet (2018, Glowing Window)
- It's Closeness, It's Easy (2025, The Flenser) (2025)

=== Mixtapes ===
- Mixtape (as How to Dress for Burial) (2013, CHVRCHDVST)

=== EPs ===
- Split with Lonesummer (2010, Music Ruins Lives)
- Late Twenties Blues (2011)
- Quietly (2012, Tycho Magnetic Anomalies)
- An Autumn Cassette or Leaves Will Bloom, Leaves Will Fall Long After We Are Gone (2012)
- Reminder (2012)
- Split with Dreamless (2013, Altar of Waste)
- Heaven or Atlantic City (2013, Tycho Magnetic Anomalies)
- Split with Lonesummer (aka Split II) (2013, Music Ruins Lives)
- Vile Process (Split with Troubled By Insects ) (2014, Apneic Void)
- Distances (2014, Bathetic Records)
- Mother Room / Planning for Burial "To Be Everything" 7" Split (2015, The Native Sound)
- With and Without (2015)
- Summer Dust Demos (2016, Glowing Window)
- Planning for Burial / Stress Waves 7" Split (2016, Nostalgium Directive)
- (something) (2017)
- Split with Drowse (2018)
- (continued) (2019)
- Basement Tapes, Volume 1 (2019)
- April May 2010 (2020)
- Sorry For Your Loss (2020)
- PFB Spring 2007 Demo (2021)
- 26 November 2022 (2022)
- Blown Out Cassette for June 2023 (2023)
- 25 November 2023 (2024)

=== Singles ===
- Untitled (2011, Music Ruins Lives)
- I Miss Our Conversations, I'm Sorry (2012, Tycho Magnetic Anomalies)
- Glowing Windows / Walk Alone (2013)
- Tracks (Tall Bodies) / Sunstorm (2013)
- Mischief Night (Split with Liar in Wait) (2014, Broken Limbs Recordings)
- Split with Liar in Wait (2014)
- Split with Mother Room (2015)
- Part Time Punks Session (2015)
- Split with Stress Waves (2016)
- As a Lover (2016, The Native Sound)
- Whiskey and Wine (2017)
- Somewhere in the Evening (2017)
- Dull Knife Pt. I (2017)
- Split with Sister Grotto and Tucker Theodore (2017)
- Several Cases of Stairs (Return) (2018)
- 17 November 2018 (2019)
- When Summer Turns to Fall (2020)
- Split with Midwife (2022)
- Murderer (2023)
- You Think (2025)

=== Compilations ===
- Matawan: Collected Works 2010-2014 (2017)

=== Music videos ===
- "29 August 2012" (2014; dir. Gardenback)

=== Compilation appearances ===
- Falling Down IIV (2012, Falling Down)
- The Haunting Presents (2012, Enemies List)
- You're All the Fucking Best: Anti-Gravity Bunny 5 Year Anniversary Compilation (2013)
- Anything for You: A Tribute to Swans (2014)
- Riffs For Reproductive Justice (2019)
- Cold Fronts (2021)
- Your Voice Is Not Enough (2024)
