= Dan Barrett =

Musical artist, member of the band Have a Nice Life

- Dan Barrett in 2025

Background information
- Also known as: Giles Corey; Black Wing
- Born: March 16, 1980 (age 46)
- Origin: Glastonbury, Connecticut, U.S.
- Genres: Post-punk; experimental rock; shoegaze; post-rock; gothic rock
- Occupations: Musician; singer; songwriter; record producer
- Instruments: Vocals; guitar
- Years active: 2000–present
- Labels: Enemies List Home Recordings; The Flenser
- Member of: Have a Nice Life
- Formerly of: Gate; Nahvalr; Married; In Pieces; The Cappuccino Jellybeans

Dan Barrett (born March 16, 1980) is an American musician. He is one half of the rock duo Have a Nice Life. Barrett's solo work has been primarily released under the aliases Giles Corey and Black Wing. Outside of this, he has been involved in various short-lived bands. In 2003, he founded the record label Enemies List Home Recordings.

== Musical career ==
Comparison of styles across Barrett's solo projects. Where the first, "Spectral Bride" by Giles Corey, is a sombre folk- and country-inspired song, "If I Let Him In" by Black Wing ventures into electronic and synthesised music.
"Spectral Bride"

"If I Let Him In"

=== Have a Nice Life ===
Barrett composes one-half of the industrial post-punk duo Have a Nice Life, which he formed alongside Tim Macuga in 2000. The duo started their career by performing "morbid acoustic songs" at local open mic events, though it was not until the death of Barrett's father that they would start recording the songs. On a budget of less than $1,000, Have a Nice Life's debut came in 2008 with Deathconsciousness, which John Hill of Noisey described as a mix of "shoegaze, noise, black metal, synthpop, drone, doom, and everything in between". The album would fail to reach a widespread public audience but gained recognition on online music platforms. Following Deathconsciousness was Time of Land, an extended play (EP) released in 2010 and distributed physically at Have a Nice Life's first official live show, occurring at The Stone in New York City. Following this, the EP was released digitally for free.

Six years after Have a Nice Life's debut, they released their second album. The Unnatural World came out on 4 February 2014 following three singles: "Defenestration Song", "Burial Society", and "Dan and Tim, Reunited by Fate".

In 2024, the duo released a cover of Low's song "When I Go Deaf" from The Great Destroyer in tribute to Mimi Parker, a member of Low who died two years earlier. The song features on the Flenser's tribute album Your Voice Is Not Enough. Have a Nice Life's interpretation extends the song's duration to eight minutes and supplements the original's slowcore sound with funereal themes.

=== Giles Corey ===
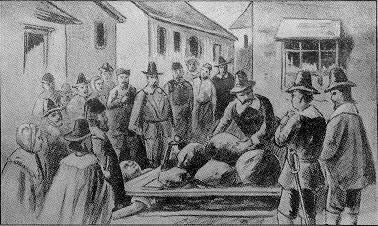
The execution of Giles Corey, a 17th-century farmer from whom the project derives its name

Giles Corey was the first main solo project of Barrett. It began as an outlet for country music but was progressively and supplementarily inspired by folk music. Barrett said the music was influenced by country singer-songwriters Hank Williams, Johnny Cash, and Merle Haggard, among others. The project took its name from Giles Corey, an English farmer accused of witchcraft during the Salem witch trials and executed by pressing. Barrett chose this as the namesake because it demonstrated the "immorality of execution", especially peine forte et dure. Barrett says of Corey: "He made them murder him. He made it ugly". This fixation on death followed a one-year period wherein Barrett contemplated, and had attempted suicide.

During the early stages of the Giles Corey project, he placed self-imposed restrictions on which instruments would be featured. However, as the debut album, the self-titled Giles Corey (2011), evolved, these constraints faded. The album draws on philosophy and the paranormal, something Barrett explored to theorise the experience of death during his depressive year. While unconvinced by the idea of an afterlife, he appreciates its symbolism: speaking to Scene Point Blank, Barrett said "I don't believe in an actual afterlife, but I believe that the image and symbolism of the afterlife describe death in a way that speaks to people, myself included". Despite the album focusing on the concept of death, he argues against it being a concept album: "I don't like the term 'concept album,' since it just sounds corny".

Giles Corey was released on 1 March 2011 to critical acclaim. According to Ray Finlayson of Beats Per Minute, "no words or descriptions will really, properly, fully prepare you for the sheer heart-wrenching emotional pull that these tracks have". The album was released alongside a book that provided more details on the album's influences, as well as various other items of prose: Stereogum described it as "an etiology of suicide, self-asphyxiation manual, novel-in-verse, a fictional biography of a cult leader, Sebaldian picture story, et al". Barrett himself advertised it as an "intensely personal, intimate portrait of depression". The book was in part a sequel to the one that accompanied Have a Nice Life's Deathconsciousness.

In continuation of the Giles Corey project, Barrett released Deconstructionist on 25 August 2012. The release comprised three tracks that in total, spanned over an hour and a half of runtime. On official sources, Deconstructionist is regarded as an album, while Wired writer Phill Cameron called it an extended play (EP). Barrett was inspired by "traditional ritual trance" while making Deconstructionist, and as such, described the release as being "designed to induce trances, possession states, and out-of-body experiences". Musically, the release is composed of binaural beats. Cameron described it as a "disconcerting racket" that feels "almost lonely; every sound echoes as if in a huge space, and the constant pressure of electronic beats adds a sense of desperate urgency to the music. It's unsettling and uncomfortable." Like his previous releases, Deconstructionist was also accompanied by a primer.

Since these albums, Barrett has released one EP and one live album under the Giles Corey pseudonym. The EP, titled Hinterkaifeck name for the murders of the same name, was released on 21 February 2013, and the live album, Live in the Middle of Nowhere, was released on 27 February 2013. The live album was recorded at a live show in the Enemies List Home Recordings warehouse in Meriden, Connecticut.

=== Black Wing ===
Black Wing is the second solo project of Barrett. The music is categorised within electronic subgenres, though maintains the gloomy and dark characteristics present in his work as Giles Corey and with Have a Nice Life. While the primary genres are distinct from those of his earlier projects, Barrett still notes similarities: "There are certain things I can point to as being pretty indicative of my aesthetic sense, little fingerprints that connect my oldest stuff with my newest stuff. None of that's on purpose, but I definitely sense it there". In an interview with The Seventh Hex, Barrett said "It's more a mood that I want to go for, rather than a specific sound". He cited 1980s new wave as an inspiration, as well as Washed Out, whom Pitchfork described as "the godfather of chillwave": a style of electronic music that Black Wing has been classified under.

Barrett began creating music as Black Wing in 2013, releasing two demos on Bandcamp: one self-titled and "My Body Betrayed Me". In June 2015, "My Body Betrayed Me" received a music video and Barrett announced ...Is Doomed, the debut album of Black Wing, which was released on 25 September 2015. The album was enjoyed by critics, though some thought it was underwhelming when compared to his previous works. Sam Robinson for Echoes and Dust said it was refreshing yet reminiscent of his previous works, but that listeners should not expect it to be "the next great milestone" in Barrett's discography. Thomas Brand for Beat was disappointed with the production but still lauded several songs, including the closer "If I Let Him In", which he considered Barrett's best work to date. Tiny Mix Tapes highlighted the same song, describing it as "centering, chilling, later explosive, terribly despondent, but humbling".

Quarantine was profoundly isolating. With writing this record, more than anything I just wanted to prove to myself that I could make something out of it. That ended up being a lot of songs about feeling isolated, a lot of "trapped in my own head" moments. I think that was a lot of people's experience as well.

— Barrett, discussing his creative process for No Moon

...Is Doomed was followed up five years later with Black Wing's second album No Moon. Created during the COVID-19 pandemic and released on 11 December 2020, it is thematically dark and emotional. No Moon was preceded by three singles: "Bollywood Apologetics", "Is This Real Life, Jesus Christ", and "Choir of Assholes / You Think It'll Make You Happy But It Won't". Like its predecessor, No Moon was enjoyed by critics, many of which said it avoided several of ...Is Doomed's shortcomings. For instance, Brian Roseler for Treblezine distinguished its production, something reviewers found issue with in ...Is Doomed. Roseler finished his review by noting that there was less lyrical intensity on this album than in Barrett's previous work, but that this was of no detriment: "It's a triumph of purposeful and intentional design, an album that was born from the pandemic, and tailored from a landscape of dreams". Conversely, Aleksandr Smirnov of Beats Per Minute disliked the change in style and opined that no song was memorable. Regardless, the album was featured as Bandcamp's "Album of the Day", and Chris Keith-Wright for Echoes and Dust called it fantastic and hoped that the next release would arrive sooner than the five-year gap between Black Wing's first two albums.

=== Other projects ===
Barrett has additionally released music under short-lived pseudonyms and bands. This includes releases with fellow Have a Nice Life member Tim Macuga under the names Gate and Nahvalr, which were post-hardcore and black metal bands respectively; as Married with his wife Thao, which released Christmas music; and as a member of the bands in Pieces and The Cappuccino Jellybeans.

== Enemies List Home Recordings ==
At a logistical level, we needed to record music and had no money. Over time we cobbled together whatever we could use. After years of recording however we could, we wanted to distribute that music. There was, then, no outlet for people like us: we wanted to make physical copies of our stuff, but labels didn't, and still don't, invest in home-recorded artists—especially ones they've never heard of and who have never played out.

— Barrett, speaking to PopMatters about the founding of Enemies List Home Recordings

In 2003, Barrett founded his record label, Enemies List Home Recordings, (Note: Occasionally shortened to Enemies List and initialised as ELHR.) because he wanted to release music to the public but did not have the financial means to distribute it through mainstream labels. It was founded solely to release Have a Nice Life's debut Deathconsciousness, and as such he used it as a personal label until 2010, at which point he allowed submissions from other bands. The label has released albums from Have a Nice Life; Barrett's solo projects Giles Corey and Black Wing; as well as unrelated artists, including Planning for Burial, Mamaleek, and Xasthur.

== Personal life ==
Barrett was born on 16 March 1980 in Glastonbury, Connecticut. He is married and has children. Outside of music, Barrett works a regular job and has a real estate marketing agency.

== Solo discography ==
=== As Giles Corey ===
Studio albums

List of studio albums, with release date and additional details
Title	Album details	Ref.
Giles Corey	Release date: 30 April 2011; Label: Enemies List Home Recordings and The Flenser	
Deconstructionist	Release date: 25 August 2012; Label: Enemies List Home Recordings	

Live albums

List of live albums, with release date and additional details
Title	Album details	Ref.
Live in the Middle of Nowhere	Release date: 27 February 2013; Label: Enemies List Home Recordings	

Extended Plays

List of extended plays, with release date and additional details
Title	Extended play details	Ref.
Hinterkaifeck	Release date: 21 February 2013; Label: Enemies List Home Recordings and The Flenser	

=== As Black Wing ===
Studio albums

List of albums, with release date and additional details
Title	Album details	Ref.
...Is Doomed	Release date: 25 September 2015; Label: The Flenser and Enemies List Home Recordings	
No Moon	Release date: 11 December 2020; Label: The Flenser	

Singles and demos

Title	Year	Album	Ref.
"Black Wing"	2013	...Is Doomed	
"My Body Betrayed Me"	2013	...Is Doomed	
"Bollywood Apologetics"	2020	No Moon	
"Is This Real Life, Jesus Christ"	2020	No Moon	
"Choir of Assholes / You Think It'll Make You Happy but It Won't"	2020	No Moon	

=== Other ===
Extended plays

List of extended plays, with release date and additional details
	Extended play details	Ref.
Drive 2 Soundtrack	Released under the name "Dan Barrett and the Cruisers"; Label: Self-released	
