= The Death of Marat =

1793 painting by Jacques-Louis David

- La Mort de Marat (French)
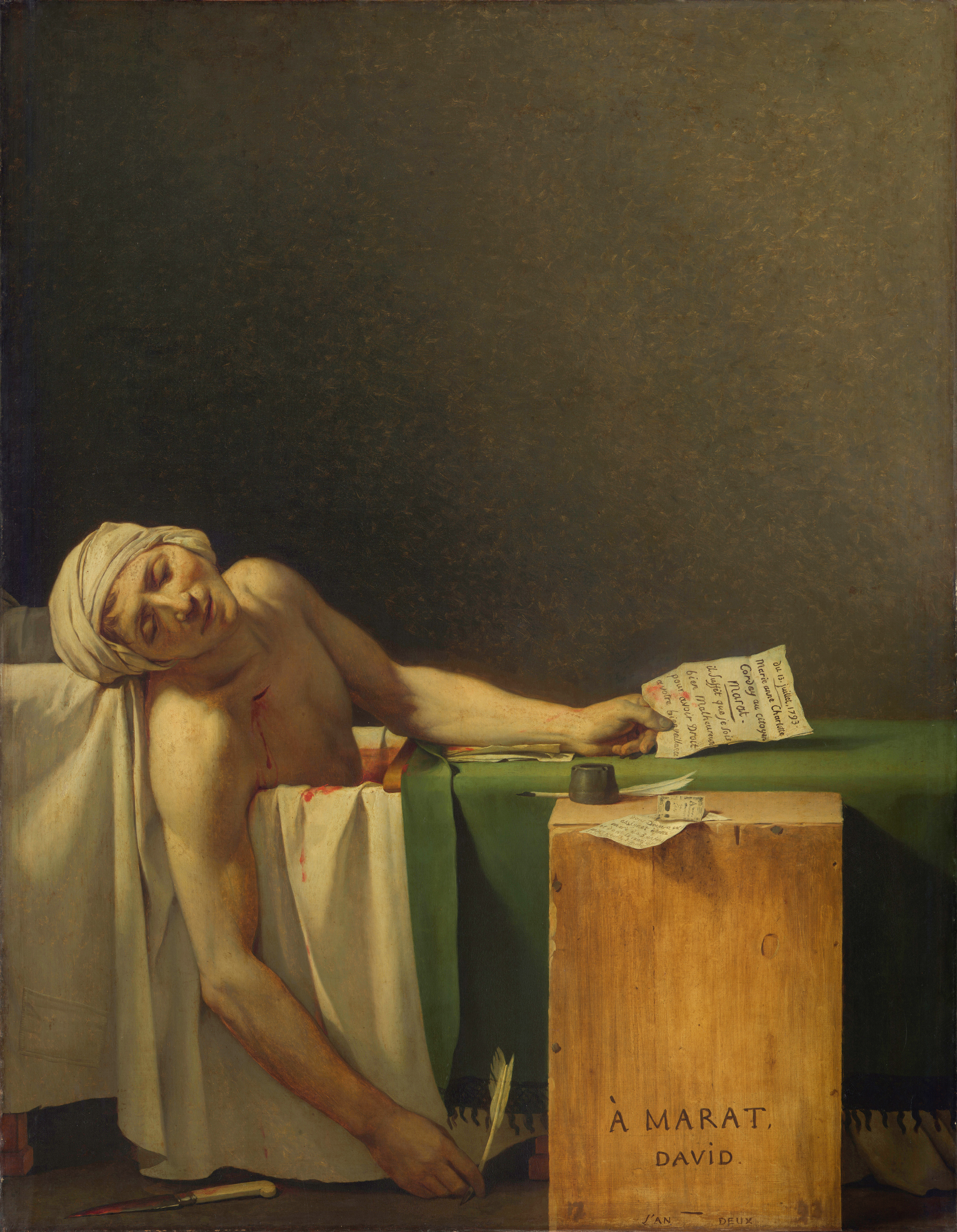
- Artist: Jacques-Louis David
- Year: 1793
- Medium: Oil on canvas
- Movement: Neoclassicism
- Dimensions: 162 cm × 128 cm (64 in × 50 in)
- Location: Royal Museums of Fine Arts of Belgium

The Death of Marat (French: La Mort de Marat or Marat Assassiné) is a 1793 painting by Jacques-Louis David depicting the artist's friend and murdered French revolutionary leader, Jean-Paul Marat. One of the most famous images from the era of the French Revolution, it was painted when David was the leading French Neoclassical painter, a Montagnard, and a member of the revolutionary Committee of General Security. Created in the months after Marat's death, the painting shows Marat lying dead in his bath after his assassination by Charlotte Corday on 13 July 1793.

In 2001, art historian T. J. Clark called David's painting the first modernist work for "the way it took the stuff of politics as its material, and did not transmute it".

The painting is in the collection of the Royal Museum of Fine Arts of Belgium. A replica, created by the artist's studio, is on display at the Louvre.

== The assassination of Marat ==
Jean-Paul Marat (24 May 1743 – 13 July 1793) was one of the leaders of the Montagnards, a radical faction active during the French Revolution from the Reign of Terror to the Thermidorian Reaction. Marat was stabbed to death by Charlotte Corday, a Girondin and political enemy of Marat who blamed Marat for the September Massacres. Corday gained entrance to Marat's dwelling promising either to divulge the names of traitors of the Revolution or to plead for the lives of her Girondin acquaintances (historical records disagree on her ostensible reason for meeting with Marat).

Marat suffered from a skin condition that caused him to spend much of his time in his bathtub; he would often work there. Corday fatally stabbed Marat, but she did not attempt to flee. She was later tried and executed for the murder.

When he was murdered, Marat was correcting a proof of his newspaper L'Ami du peuple. The blood-stained page is preserved. In the painting, the note Marat is holding is not an actual quotation of Corday, but a fictional expression based on what Corday might have said.

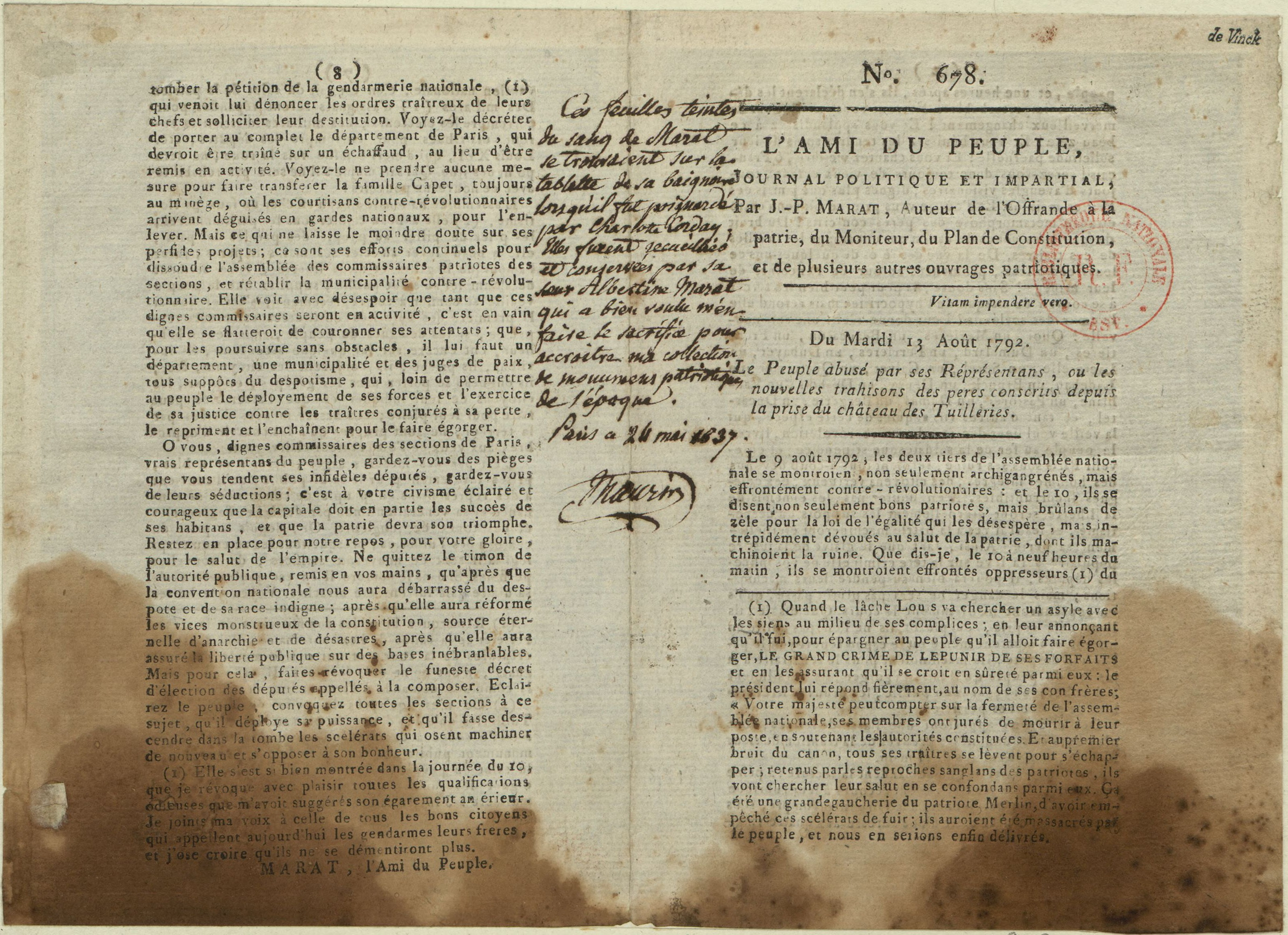
A copy of L’Ami du peuple stained with the blood of Marat

== David's politics ==
The leading French painter of his generation, David was a prominent Montagnard and a Jacobin, aligned with Marat and Maximilien Robespierre. As a deputy of the museum section at the National Convention, David voted for the death of French king Louis XVI and served on the Committee of General Security, where he actively participated in sentencing and imprisonment, eventually presiding over the "section des interrogatoires". David was also on the Committee of Public Instruction.

== Style ==
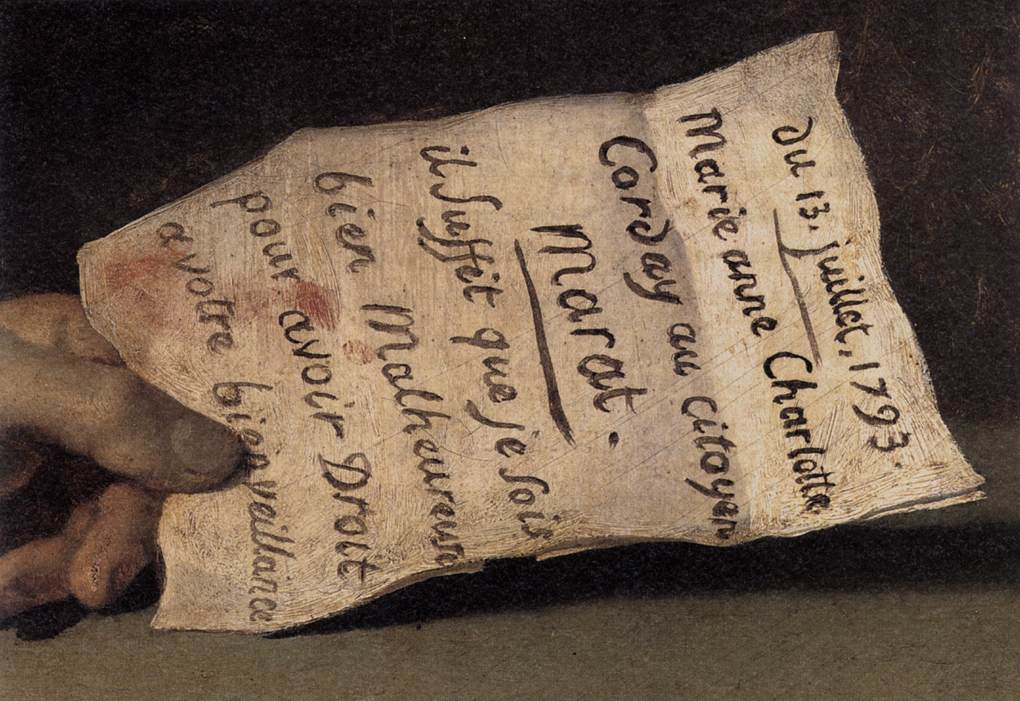
Detail of The Death of Marat showing the paper held in Marat's left hand. The letter reads "Il suffit que je sois bien malheureuse pour avoir droit a votre bienveillance" which translates to "It is enough that I am very unhappy to be entitled to your benevolence"

The Death of Marat has often been compared to Michelangelo's Pietà, a major similarity being the elongated arm hanging down in both works. David admired Caravaggio's works, especially Entombment of Christ, which mirrors The Death of Marat's drama and light.

David sought to transfer the sacred qualities long associated with the monarchy and the Catholic Church to the new French Republic. He painted Marat, martyr of the Revolution, in a style reminiscent of a Christian martyr, with the face and body bathed in a soft, glowing light.

According to Artforum, the painting was "a revolutionary icon so novel in its approach to painting that some scholars insist it singlehandedly inaugurated modernism."

== Later history ==
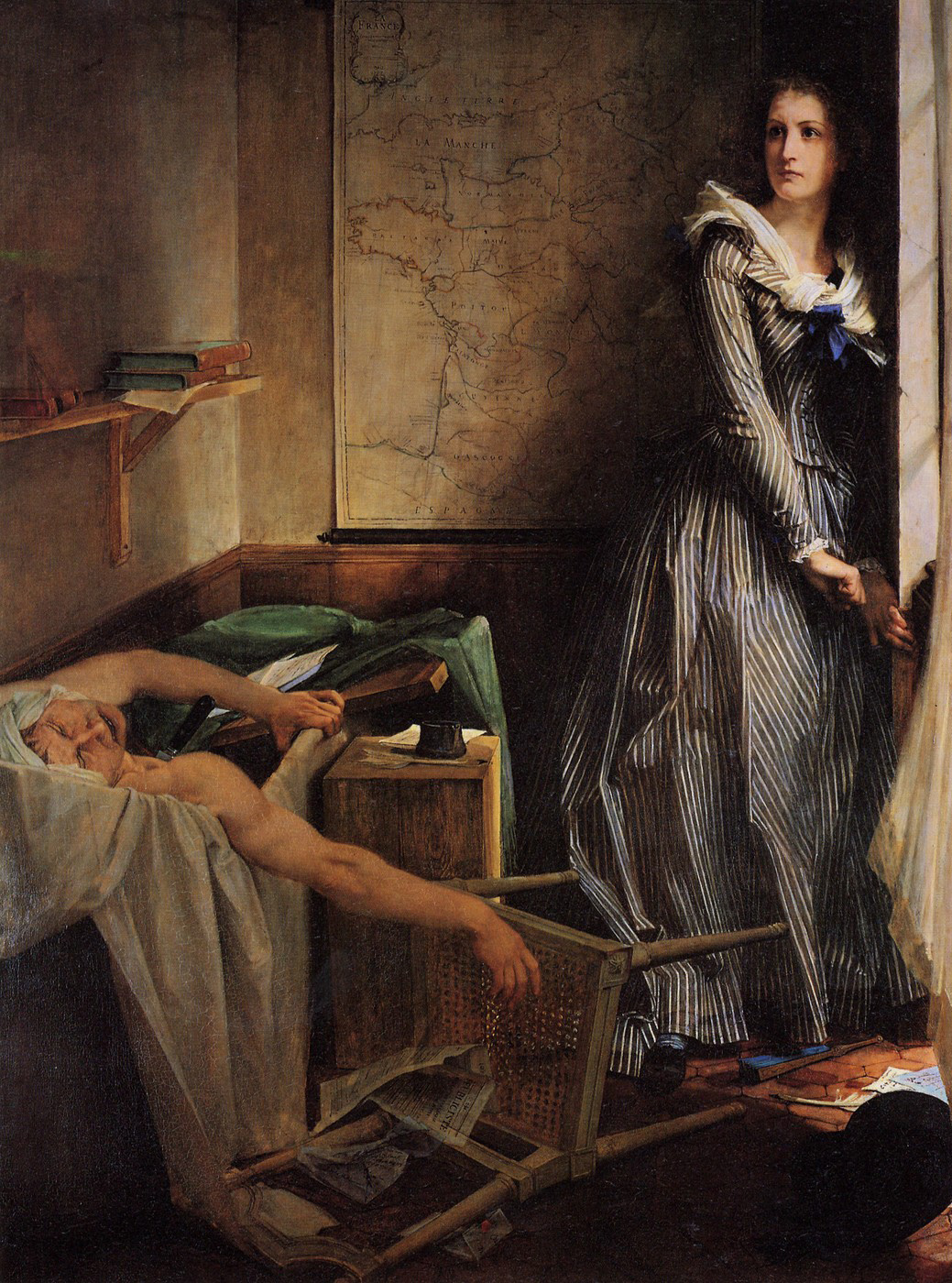
Charlotte Corday by Paul Jacques Aimé Baudry, painted 1860.

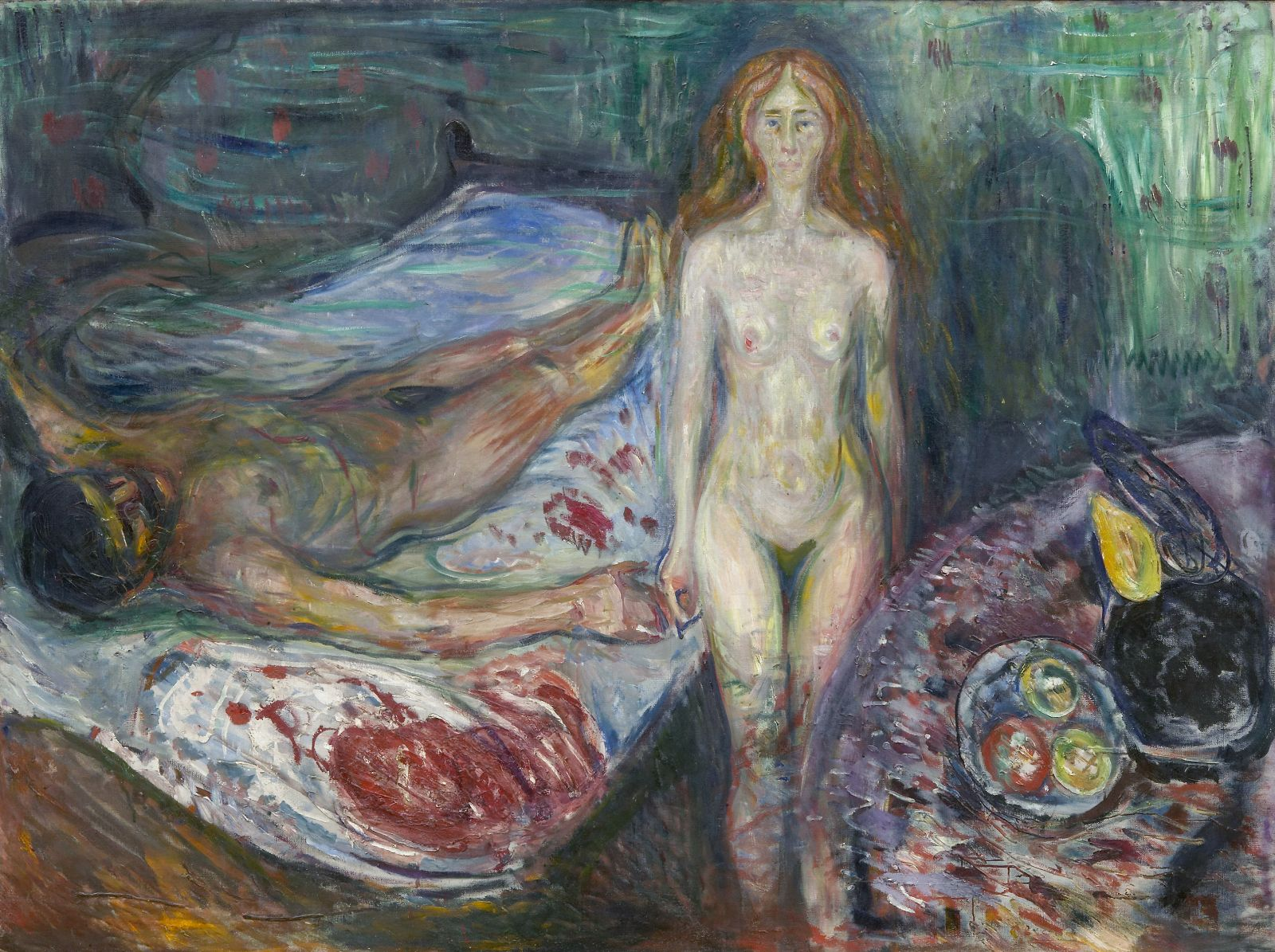
One of two versions of Death of Marat made by Edvard Munch in 1907

Several copies of the painting were made by David's pupils in 1793–1794, when the image was a popular symbol of martyrdom amid the Reign of Terror. From 1795 to David's death, the painting languished in obscurity. During David's exile in Belgium, it was hidden, somewhere in France, by Antoine Gros, David's most famous pupil. After David's death in 1825, his family tried unsuccessfully to sell the painting.

There was renewed interest in the painting after Pierre-Joseph Proudhon and Charles Baudelaire praised the work after seeing it at the Bazar Bonne-Nouvelle in 1845. Baudelaire wrote about the painting:

There is something at once both tender and poignant about this work; in the icy air of that room, on those chilly walls, about that cold and funereal bath, hovers a soul. May we have your leave, you politicians of all parties, and you too, wild liberals of 1845, to give way to emotion before David’s masterpiece? This painting was a gift to a weeping country, and there is nothing dangerous about our tears.

In the late nineteen century David's descendants bequeathed the painting to the city of Brussels. The painting was acquired by the Royal Museums of Fine Arts of Belgium in 1893.

Nineteenth-century paintings inspired by David's work include Paul Jacques Aimé Baudry's Charlotte Corday. In the 20th century, David's painting inspired artists such as Pablo Picasso and Edvard Munch, poets (Alessandro Mozzambani) and writers (Peter Weiss' play Marat/Sade). The painting has also been appropriated by Herman Braun-Vega, at times as a vehicle for political commentary.

The letter that appears in the painting, with blood-stains and bath water marks still visible, has survived and was owned by Robert Lindsay, 29th Earl of Crawford.

== In popular culture ==
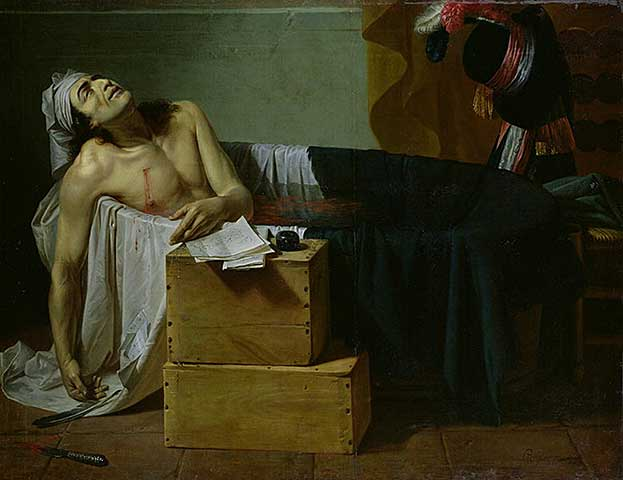
The Death of Marat by Guillaume-Joseph Roques (1793); a knife lies on the floor at lower left in the paintings by Roques and David

- In 1897, the French director Georges Hatot made a movie entitled La Mort de Marat. This early silent film made for the Lumière Company is a brief single-shot scene of the assassination of Marat.
- Monty Pythons Flying Circus TV series featured a skit entitled “It's Wolfgang Amadeus Mozart' / Famous Deaths”. John Cleese (as Mozart) reviews famous historical deaths, including “Marat in his bathtub”.
- The composition influenced one of the scenes in Stanley Kubrick's 1975 adaptation of Barry Lyndon.
- The cover art of the 1980 album East by Australian pub rock band Cold Chisel, was inspired by the painting.
- Andrzej Wajda's 1983 film Danton includes several scenes in David's atelier, including one showing the painting of Marat's portrait.
- Derek Jarman's 1986 film Caravaggio imitates the painting in a scene where the chronicler (head bound in a towel and writing with a typewriter), slouches back in his tub, with one arm extended outside the tub.
- The painting appears in the background of the cover art for the 1986 Blow Monkeys album Animal Magic.
- Vik Muniz recreated the Death of Marat with waste from a massive landfill near Rio de Janeiro in his 2010 documentary Waste Land. The picture is prominently featured on the DVD cover.
- Steve Goodman re-created the painting (with himself in place of Marat) for the cover of his 1977 album Say It in Private.
- The painting is recreated in The Red Violin (1998), in the scene when Jason Flemyng, playing violinist Frederick Pope, leans back in a bathtub with a letter from his lover in his hand.
- In the 2002 movie, About Schmidt, Jack Nicholson's character Warren falls asleep in the bath whilst composing a letter, recreating David's painting.
- The painting was used as the album art for American band Have a Nice Life's 2008 album Deathconsciousness.
- The painting was used as the album art for American band The New Regime’s 2008 album Coup.
- In season 9, episode 3 ("Art Imitates Life") of CSI: Crime Scene Investigation, a serial killer poses his victims peculiarly, one such victim's posture being an homage to David's painting.
- In 2013, the American singer Lady Gaga recreated several artworks for her album Artpop, one of which was The Death of Marat.
- In 2014, Ubisoft’s Assassin’s Creed franchise featured this event in a side mission in Assassin’s Creed Unity, aptly titled The Assassination of Jean-Paul Marat.
- The painting is the subject of an episode in the 2006 BBC series Simon Schama's Power of Art.
- The painting was mentioned as a favorite of the narrator in the novel My Year of Rest and Relaxation by Ottessa Moshfegh.
- The painting is referenced by US alternative rock band R.E.M. in the lyrics of their song "We Walk" and in the video to their song "Drive".
- The cover art to singer-songwriter Andrew Bird's 2019 album My Finest Work Yet features a recreation of the painting with Bird in place of Marat.
- The Death of Marat is one of many paintings animated in the video for the song "Alpha Zulu" by the French alternative rock band Phoenix.
- In Season 1, episode 9 ("Marat Sade") of The Testaments, Commander Grove is stabbed to death while taking a bath and his body is seen in a pose recreating the painting.

== See also ==
- List of paintings by Jacques-Louis David

== Bibliography ==
- T J Clark, "Painting in the Year Two", in Representations, No. 47, Special Issue: National Cultures before Nationalism (Summer, 1994), pp. 13–63.
- Thibaudeau, M.A., Vie de David, Bruxelles (1826)
- Delécluze, E., Louis David, son école et son temps, Paris, (1855) re-edition Macula (1983) – First-hand testimony by a pupil of David
- David, J.L., Le peintre Louis David 1748–1825. Souvenirs & Documents inédits par J.L. David son Petit-Fils, ed. Victor Havard, Paris (1880)
- Holma, Klaus, David. Son évolution, son style, Paris (1940)
- Adhé mar Jean, David. Naissance du génie d'un peintre, ed. Raoul Solar, Paris (1953)
- Bowman, F.P., 'Le culte de Marat, figure de Jésus', Le Christ romantique, ed. Droz, Genève, pp. 62 sq. (1973)
- Wildenstein, Daniel et Guy, Documents complémentaires au catalogue de l’oeuvre de Louis David, Paris, Fondation Wildenstein (1973) – fondamental source to track all influences constituting David's visual culture
- Starobinski, Jean, 1789, les emblèmes de la raison, ed. Flammarion, Paris (1979)
- Schnapper, Antoine, David témoin de son temps, ed. Office du Livre, Fribourg (1980)
- Kruft, H.-W., "An antique model for David's Marat" in The Burlington Magazine CXXV, 967 (October 1983), pp. 605–607; CXXVI, 973 (April 84)
- Traeger, Jorg, Der Tod des Marat: Revolution des menschenbildes, ed. Prestel, München (1986)
- Thévoz, Michel, Le théâtre du crime. Essai sur la peinture de David, éd. de Minuit, Paris (1989)
- Guilhaumou, J., La mort de Marat, ed. Complexe, Bruxelles (1989)
- Mortier, R., 'La mort de Marat dans l'imagerie révolutionnaire', Bulletin de la Classe des Beaux-Arts, Académie Royale de Belgique, 6ème série, tome I, 10–11 (1990), pp. 131–144
- Simon, Robert, "David’s Martyr-Portrait of Le Peletier de Saint-Fargeau and the conundrums of Revolutionary Representation" in Art History, vol.14, n°4 (December 1991), pp. 459–487
- Sérullaz, Arlette, Inventaire général des dessins. Ecole française. Dessins de Jacques-Louis David 1748–1825, Paris (1991)
- David contre David, actes du colloque au Louvre du 6–10 décembre 1989, éd. R. Michel, Paris (1993) [M. Bleyl, "Marat : du portrait à la peinture d'histoire"]
- Malvone, Laura, "L'Évènement politique en peinture. A propos du Marat de David" in Mélanges de l'École française de Rome. Italie et Méditerranée, n° 106, 1 (1994)
- Pacco, M., De Vouet à David. Peintures françaises du Musée d'Art Ancien, XVIIe et XVIIIe siècles, ed. MRBAB, Bruxelles (1994)
- Hofmann, Werner, Une époque en rupture 1750–1830, Gallimard, Paris (1995)
- Crow, T., Emulation. Making artists for Revolutionary France, ed. Yale University Press, New Haven London (1995)
- Monneret, Sophie, David et le néoclassicisme, ed. Terrail, Paris (1998)
- Robespierre, edited by Colin Haydon & William Doyle, Cambridge (1999)
- Lajer-Burcharth, E., Necklines. The art of Jacques-Louis David after the Terror, ed. Yale University Press, New Haven London (1999)
- Lee, S., David, ed. Phaidon, London (1999); * Aston, Nigel, Religion and Revolution in France, 1780–1804, McMillan, London (2000)
- Jacques-Louis David’s Marat, edited by William Vaughan & Helen Weston, Cambridge (2000)
- Rosenberg, Pierre & Louis-Antoine Prat, Jacques-Louis David 1748–1825. Catalogue raisonné des dessins, 2 volumes, éd. Leonardo Arte, Milan (2002)
- Idem, Peronnet, Benjamin, "Un album inédit de David", Revue de l’Art, n°142, (2003–2004) pp. 45–83
- Coquard, Olivier, "Marat assassiné. Reconstitution abusive" in Historia Mensuel, n°691 (juillet 2004)
- Vanden Berghe, Marc & Ioana Plesca, Nouvelles perspectives sur la Mort de Marat: entre modèle jésuite et références mythologiques, Bruxelles (2004) / New perspectives for David's Death of Marat, Brussels (2004), available at the KBR, Brussels.
- Idem, Lepeletier de Saint-Fargeau sur son lit de mort par Jacques Louis-David : saint Sébastien révolutionnaire, miroir multiréférencé de Rome, Brussels (2005), available at the KBR, Brussels.
- Sainte-Fare Garnot, N., Jacques-Louis David 1748–1825, Paris, Ed. Chaudun (2005)
- Johnson, Dorothy, Jacques-Louis David: New Perspectives, University of Delaware Press (2006)
- Guilhaumou, Jacques, La mort de Marat (2006) revolution-francaise.net
- Plume de Marat – Plumes sur Marat, pour une bibliographie générale, (Chantiers Marat, vol. 9–10), Editions Pôle Nord, Bruxelles (2006)
- Angelitti, Silvana, "La Morte di Marat e la Pietà di Michelangelo" in La propaganda nella storia, sl, (sd), e-torricelli.it
- Pesce, Luigi, Marat assassinato : il tema del braccio della morte : realismo caravagesco e ars moriendi in David, s.ed., sl, (2007) best glowing tips
