= Earthmover (disambiguation) =

An earthmover is a heavy-duty vehicle.

Earthmover or Earth Mover may also refer to:

- Earth Mover, a 2006 album by Cosmic Gate
- Earthmover, a 2007 EP by Once Nothing
- Earthmover (character), a character from Batman Beyond
- "Earth Mover" (Batman Beyond), a 1999 episode of Batman Beyond
- "Earthmover", the final track from Have a Nice Life's 2008 album Deathconsciousness
- 1000-THR "Earthmover", a boss from the 2020 first-person shooter Ultrakill
- Earth mover's distance, a measure in computer science
