= The Unnatural World =

Studio album by Have a Nice Life
- Released: February 4, 2014
- Recorded: 2008–2012
- Genre: Post-punk; gothic rock
- Length: 47:20
- Label: Enemies List Home Recordings, The Flenser

Have a Nice Life chronology
Time of Land (2010)	The Unnatural World (2014)	Sea of Worry (2019)

Professional ratings
Aggregate scores
Source	Rating
Metacritic	79/100
Review scores
Source	Rating
AbsolutePunk	9.25/10
Pitchfork	7.8/10
Unrecorded	78/100

The Unnatural World is the second studio album by American rock duo Have a Nice Life. It was released on February 4, 2014, via The Flenser and the band's own record label Enemies List Home Recordings. It is a follow-up to 2008's Deathconsciousness and 2010's Time of Land EP.

The band recorded the album from 2008 to 2012 "in various bedrooms" between Connecticut and Massachusetts, according to its liner notes. The tracks "Defenestration Song" and "Burial Society" premiered in December 2013 and January 2014, respectively. The full album was streamed by Pitchfork Media from January 20 to January 27, 2014.

== Tracks and musical style ==
Andrew Sacher and Wyatt Marshall of BrooklynVegan wrote that "the album falls somewhere between goth, noise, shoegaze and post-punk." They also described the album as "addictively melodic for such dark music."

Noisey Vice stated that the song "Burial Society" had "a Nine Inch Nails-meets-post-punk vibe," which "evidenced Have a Nice Life's leanings on the sonic dark side in the record. Lars Gotrich of NPR described the track "Defenestration Song" as "the kind of pitch-black, post-punk party-rocker that'd really turn up at any Goth Night dance." He also wrote: "A two-note guitar riff is barely heard above the dank din as warming feedback permeates the whole affair, like the kind that lulls you to sleep just before an icy death" while comparing the song's rhythm and distorted bass line to the works of the gothic rock pioneers Bauhaus.

Of the track "Dan and Tim, Reunited by Fate", Tiny Mix Tapes wrote that "the pair cherrypick tropes from a number of bleak traditions: reverb-drenched industrial beats; doom-metal sludge; shoegaze drones conjured from effects pedals; post-punk bass chuggery; a plaintive piano+static post-rock crescendo." Tiny Mix Tapes also wrote that the band holds this genre palette together "by matching its compositional ambitions with idiosyncratic recording and production techniques."

== Track listing ==
All tracks are written by Dan Barrett and Tim Macuga.

No.	Title	Length
1.	"Guggenheim Wax Museum"	5:14
2.	"Defenestration Song"	6:02
3.	"Burial Society"	6:40
4.	"Music Will Untune the Sky"	5:00
5.	"Cropsey"	7:10
6.	"Unholy Life"	2:50
7.	"Dan and Tim, Reunited by Fate"	5:35
8.	"Emptiness Will Eat the Witch"	8:49
Total length:		47:20

== Personnel ==
Have a Nice Life

- Dan Barrett – performance, writing
- Tim Macuga – performance, writing

Production

- Kevin Blackler – mastering
