= Charlotte Corday (painting) =

Painting by Paul Baudry

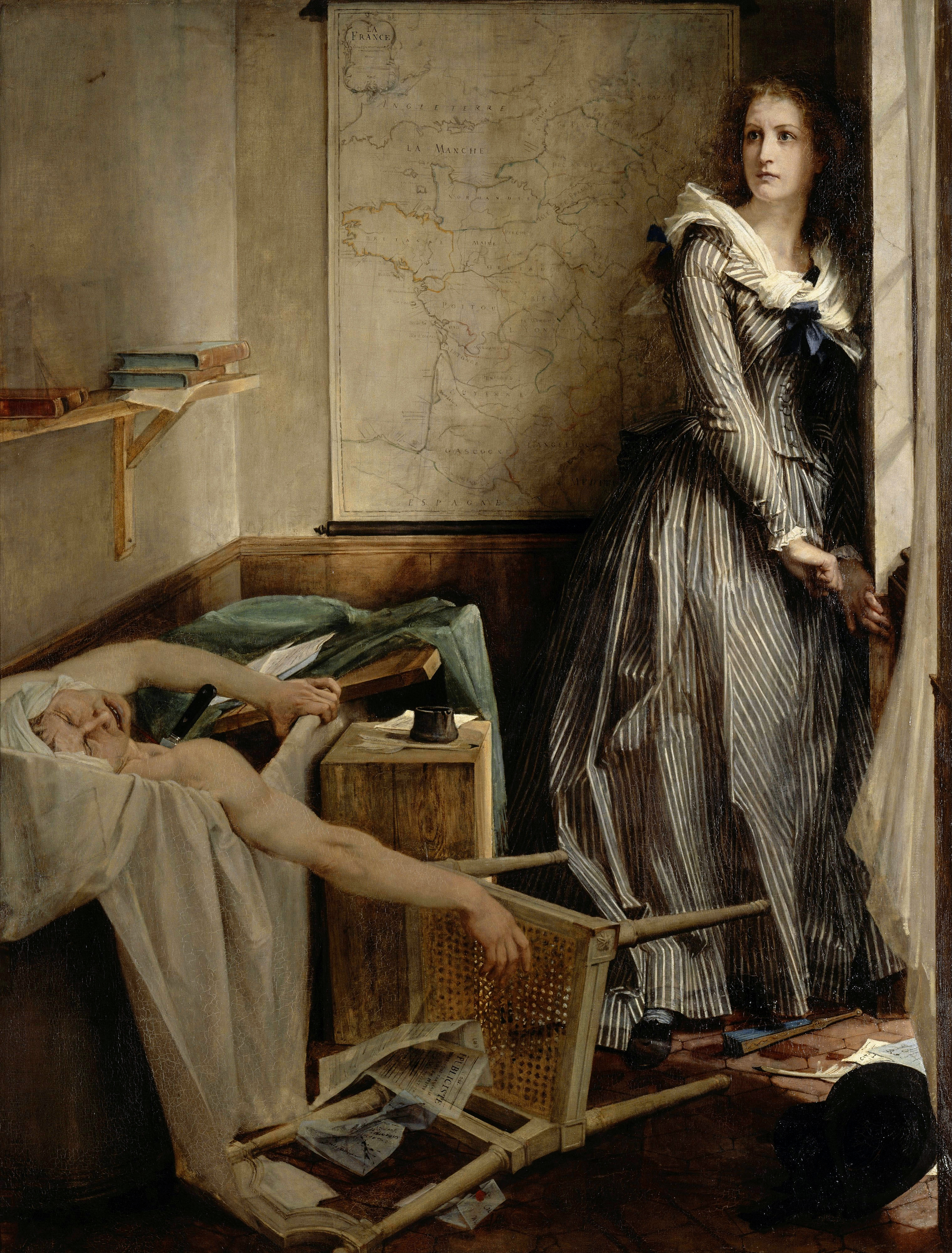
- Artist: Paul Baudry
- Year: 1860
- Medium: Oil on canvas, history painting
- Dimensions: 203 cm × 154 cm (80 in × 61 in)
- Location: Fine Arts Museum of Nantes; Nantes

Charlotte Corday is an 1860 history painting by the French artist Paul Baudry. It depicts the aftermath of the assassination of French Revolutionary Jean-Paul Marat by Charlotte Corday on 13 July 1793. Corday, a supporter of the rival Girondist faction, stabbed Marat to death while he was in his bath. The scene had previously been depicted by Jacques-Louis David's Neoclassical The Death of Marat While David's focus was on the slain Marat, Baudry shifts this to emphasise the emotions of his killer Corday. By the time Baudry produced the work, Corday who was executed shortly after the assassination, had come to be seen as a popular martyr. This is illustrated by the map of France on the wall, suggesting Corday has saved the nation from the oppressive Marat.

The painting was displayed at the Salon of 1861 in Paris. Today it is in the collection of the Fine Arts Museum in Nantes, having been acquired the same year.

== Bibliography ==
- Gilbert, Pamela K. Victorian Skin: Surface, Self, History. Cornell University Press, 2019.
- Huntsman, Penny. Thinking About Art: A Thematic Guide to Art History. John Wiley & Sons, 2015.
