= The Pearl and the Wave =

1862 painting by Paul-Jacques-Aimé Baudry

The Wave and the Pearl
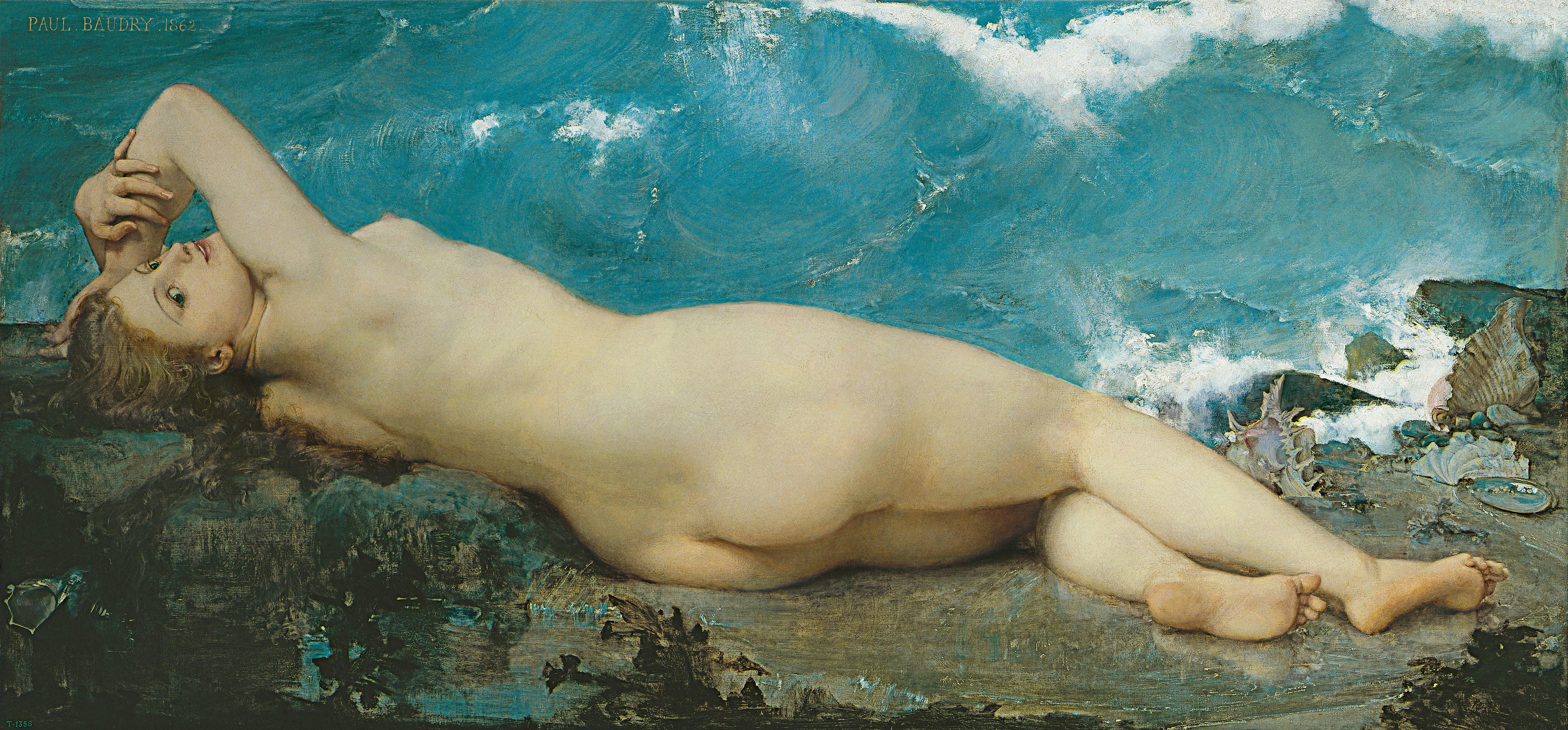
- Artist: Paul-Jacques-Aimé Baudry
- Year: 1862
- Medium: Oil on canvas
- Dimensions: 83.5 cm × 178 cm (32.9 in × 70 in)
- Location: Museo del Prado, Madrid, Spain

The Pearl and the Wave (French: La Perle et la vague), also known as The Wave and the Pearl, is a painting by the French artist Paul-Jacques-Aimé Baudry created in 1862. The painting shows a nude woman lying on the edge of a rocky sea shore, with her head turned to gaze backward over her shoulder towards the viewer. Waves are breaking in the background.

The Pearl and the Wave was the subject of contemporary curiosity. The painting was met with praise from art critics for its technique and distinguishing quality. Artist Kenyon Cox described The Pearl and the Wave as "the most perfect painting of the nude" in the 19th century. Cox identified some features in the painting which he described as "grace of attitude", the well-rounded but slim body of a young woman, the visible dimple in the shoulder, the "savoring of subtle line", the "loveliness of the color", the "solid yet mysterious modelling", and the "perfection of delicate surface". Cox believed these features make this painting what he calls "a pure masterpiece".

Art historian Bailey Van Hook identified The Pearl and the Wave as one of the examples of nude paintings where the subject woman is shown lying down sluggishly for the gratification of the looker-on who she describes as "voyeuristic viewer". Nineteenth-century French art critic Jules-Antoine Castagnary commented that the woman in the painting may be "a Parisian modiste ... lying in wait for a millionaire gone astray in this wild spot."

In 1863, Empress consort Eugénie de Montijo bought the painting for 20,000 francs. It was her second most costly purchase of the paintings of that time. Today the painting is in the collection of the Museo del Prado in Madrid, the main Spanish national art museum.

== See also ==
- The Birth of Venus (Cabanel)
