= Sea of Worry =

Studio album by Have a Nice Life
- Released: November 8, 2019
- Genre: Shoegaze; post-punk; post-rock
- Length: 46:19
- Label: The Flenser

Have a Nice Life chronology
| The Unnatural World (2014) | Sea of Worry (2019) |

Singles from Sea of Worry
- 1. "Sea of Worry" Released: August 27, 2019; 2. "Lords of Tresserhorn" Released: September 17, 2019; 3. "Science Beat" Released: October 15, 2019; 4. "Dracula Bells" Released: November 7, 2019

Sea of Worry is the third studio album by American band Have a Nice Life, released on November 8, 2019, on the Flenser. It is their first album to feature a full band.

== Background and recording ==
The album was announced by the band in August 2019. Shortly after the announcement, on the 27th, the band released the title track as a single. Three other singles were released in advance of the album: "Lords of Tresserhorn", on September 17; "Science Beat", on October 15; and "Dracula Bells", on November 7.

Two of the tracks, "Trespassers W" and "Destinos", were re-recorded versions of songs that appeared on their 2009 compilation album Voids. Dan Barrett had been working on producing "Destinos" by 2006 at the latest, according to a blog post.

== Musical style ==
The album has been described as more straightforward and accessible than the band's previous two LPs. Similarly, it is significantly more polished and has higher production quality, a departure from the band's typical lo-fi sound. Both Barrett and Macuga said that the album was heavily influenced by the British post-punk band the Chameleons.

The album takes influence from several genres, varying from track to track. Songs like "Sea of Worry", "Science Beat", and "Dracula Bells" have been compared to post-punk, new wave, and gothic rock. "Lords of Tresserhorn", according to Marika Zorzi of New Noise Magazine, "seamlessly blends their sweeping shoegaze/post-punk/experimental sound" in a way reminiscent of their earlier releases, while Bill Peel of Kill Your Stereo noted a post-rock influence. The album also features an instrumental track: "Everything We Forget". "Trespassers W" reminded Macuga of the band Hey Mercedes, which was one of the first groups that he bonded with Barrett over.

== Album themes ==
Much like the band's previous releases, many songs feature lyrics about depression. Dan Barrett said that the central theme of the album is: "Jesus Christ, it’s just hard to be alive right now."

Moreover, several songs discuss religion, particularly Christianity. "Dracula Bells" and "Trespassers W" both feature lyrics critical of the religion, while "Destinos" begins with a recording of a preacher lecturing about God sending sinners to hell.

The name of the track "Lords of Tresserhorn" is a reference to Magic: the Gathering. The song was inspired by Barrett's children.

== Critical reception ==
Professional ratings
Review scores
| Source | Rating |
|---|---|
| Kill Your Stereo | 70/100 |
| Pitchfork | 7.4/10 |
| Sputnikmusic | 2.8/5 |
| Wolfgang Magazin | 5.4/10 |

The album was praised by Aristocrazia Webzine, who wrote that "being sad has never been so beautiful." Other outlets that gave the album positive feedback include Pitchfork, Spectrum Culture, and Stereogum.

The release was panned by Sputnikmusic, calling it "predictable".

== Track listing ==
All tracks are written by Dan Barrett and Tim Macuga.

| No. | Title | Length |
|---|---|---|
| 1. | "Sea of Worry" | 4:40 |
| 2. | "Dracula Bells" | 7:44 |
| 3. | "Science Beat" | 5:35 |
| 4. | "Trespassers W" | 4:49 |
| 5. | "Everything We Forget" | 4:12 |
| 6. | "Lords of Tresserhorn" | 6:07 |
| 7. | "Destinos" | 13:12 |
| Total length: | | 46:19 |

== Personnel ==
Have a Nice Life

- Dan Barrett
- Tim Macuga

Band

- Joe Streeter – guitar
- Myke Cameron – bass
- Rich Otero – drums, synthesizer
