= Your Voice Is Not Enough =

2024 tribute album to Low

Compilation album by Various Artists
- Released: 24 May 2024
- Genre: Slowcore
- Length: 42:37
- Label: The Flenser

Singles from Your Voice Is Not Enough
- 1. "Words" Released: 19 December 2023; 2. "Murderer" Released: 24 December 2023; 3. "Hey Chicago" Released: 13 March 2024; 4. "When I Go Deaf" Released: 24 April 2024

Your Voice Is Not Enough is a tribute album featuring covers of songs by Low in dedication to Mimi Parker. The album was announced in December 2023 without a release date. The collection contains contributions from artists such as Planning for Burial, Have a Nice Life, and Midwife among other bands, and was collated and released by the record label The Flenser.

== Background ==
Mimi Jo Parker was born in 1967 near Bemidji, Minnesota. In primary school, Parker met Alan Sparhawk, who she would later marry and have two children with. The two would form Low in 1993, alongside bassist John Nichols. Low would help pioneer a genre of indie rock music that came to be known as "slowcore", and in so doing, garnered a significant reputation in the underground music scene. Low released music until their final album, Hey What, in 2021. Throughout their career, they released 13 albums.

Parker died on 7 November 2022 from ovarian cancer. In December 2023, The Flenser announced they would be releasing a tribute album in her honour. The idea had originated prior to her death, in a conversation with Planning for Burial's Tom Wasluck and The Flenser. Allison Lorenzen released the first single, a cover of "Words" from Low's 1994 debut I Could Live in Hope, on 19 December 2023. This was followed up shortly after on 24 December by Planning for Burial's cover of "Murderer", from 2007's Drums and Guns. In 2024, the third and fourth singles were released. On 13 March Drowse and Lula Asplund released their cover of "Hey Chicago" from the 1997 extended play Songs for a Dead Pilot. One month later, on 24 April, Have a Nice Life's cover of "When I Go Deaf", from the 2005 album The Great Destroyer, was released.

The album was released on 24 May 2024.

== Track listing ==
Your Voice Is Not Enough track listing
No.	Title	Performing artist	Length
1.	"Weight of Water" (from Secret Name, 1999)	Cremation Lily	4:48
2.	"Sunflower" (from Things We Lost in the Fire, 2001)	Holy Water	4:52
3.	"Do You Know How to Waltz" (from The Curtain Hits the Cast, 1996)	Midwife and Amulets	8:28
4.	"Hey Chicago" (from Songs for a Dead Pilot, 1997)	Drowse (feat. Lula Asplund)	3:17
5.	"Cut" (from I Could Live in Hope, 1994)	Kathryn Mohr	4:32
6.	"Words" (from I Could Live in Hope, 1994)	Allison Lorenzen	4:31
7.	"Murderer" (from Drums and Guns, 2007)	Planning for Burial	3:55
8.	"When I Go Deaf" (from The Great Destroyer, 2005)	Have a Nice Life	8:14
Total length:			42:37
