= Paul-Jacques-Aimé Baudry =

French painter (1828-1886)

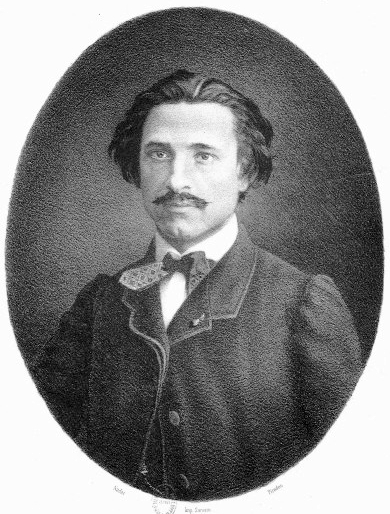
- Portrait published in L'Artiste, 1862
- Born: 7 November 1828; La Roche-sur-Yon, France
- Died: 17 January 1886 (aged 57); Paris, France
- Occupation: Artist
- Awards: Prix de Rome

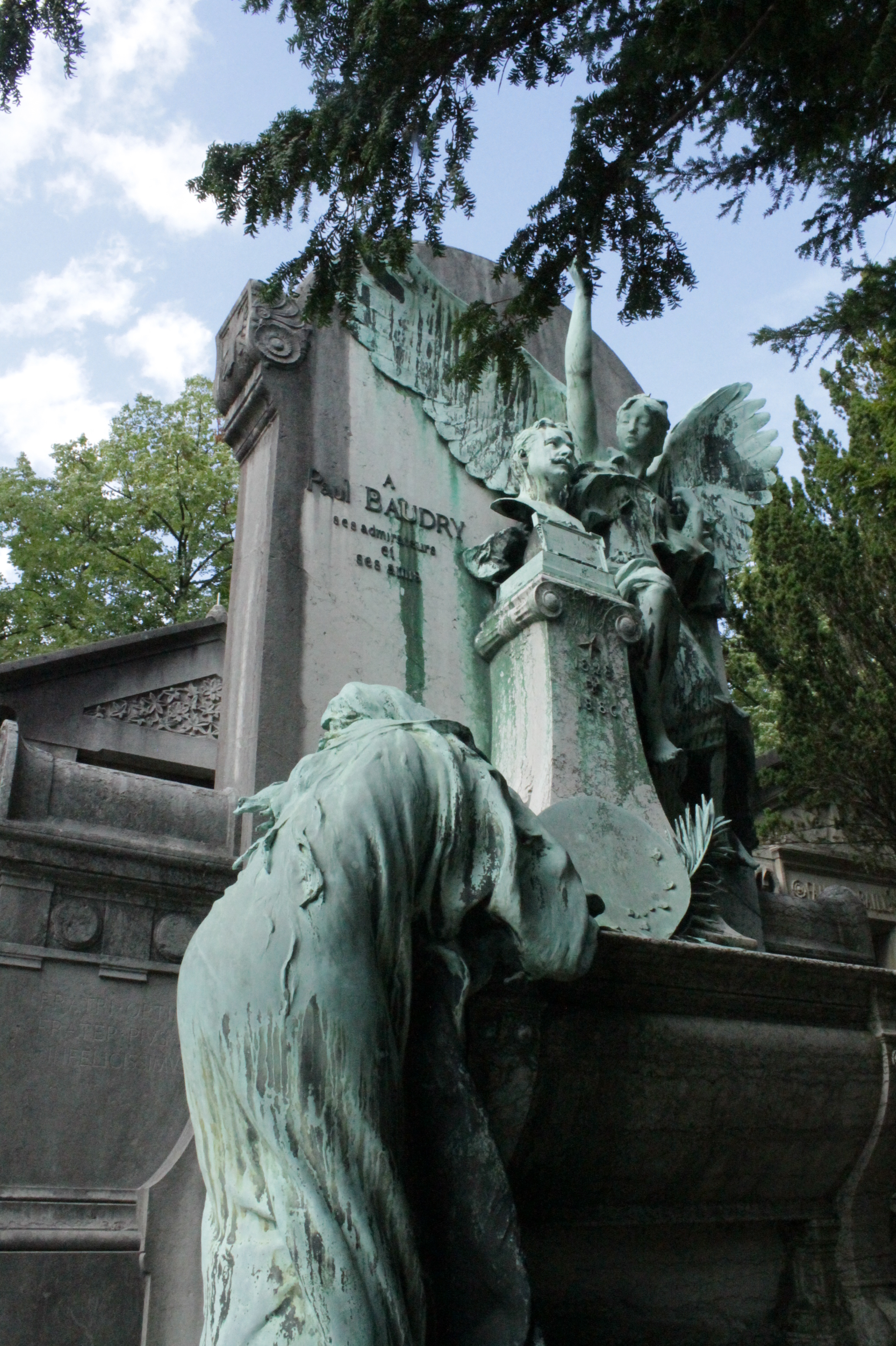
The grave of Paul Baudry, Pere Lachaise Cemetery, Paris

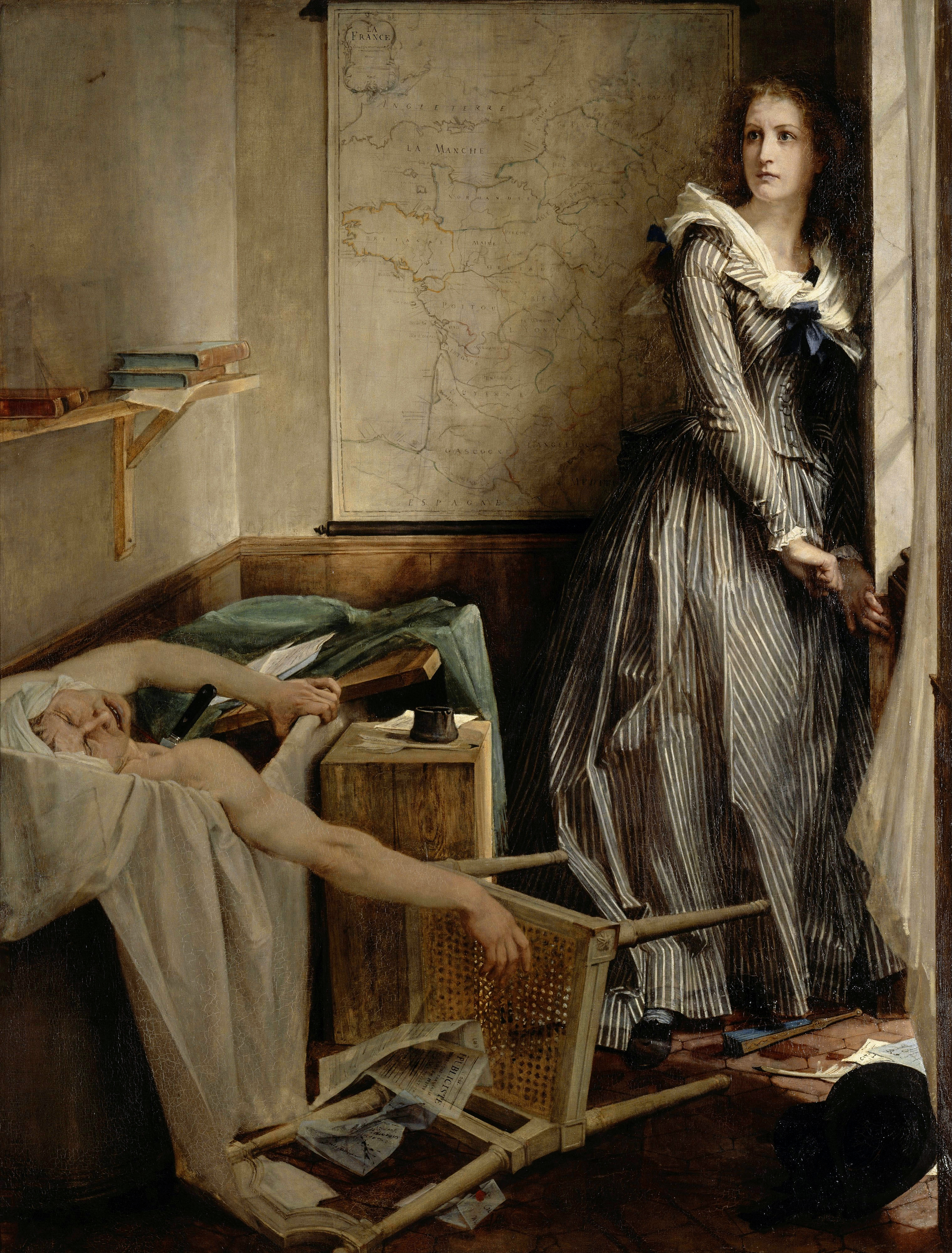
Charlotte Corday, 1860, Musée des Beaux-Arts de Nantes

Paul-Jacques-Aimé Baudry (7 November 1828 – 17 January 1886) was a French painter.

== Life ==
Baudry was born in 1828 in La Roche-sur-Yon in the Vendée. He studied art under Michel Martin Drolling and enrolled in the École des Beaux-Arts in 1845. He won the Prix de Rome in 1850 for his picture of Zenobia found on the banks of the Araxes.

His talent from the first revealed itself as strictly academical, full of elegance and grace, but somewhat lacking originality. In the course of his residence in Italy Baudry derived strong inspiration from Italian art with the mannerism of Correggio, as was very evident in the two works he exhibited in the Salon of 1857, which were purchased for the Luxembourg: The Martyrdom of a Vestal Virgin and The Child.

His Leda, St John the Baptist, and a Portrait of Beul, exhibited at the same time, took a first prize that year. Throughout this early period Baudry commonly selected mythological or fanciful subjects, one of the most noteworthy being The Pearl and the Wave (1862).

Once only did he attempt an historical picture, Charlotte Corday (1860); and returned by preference to the former class of subjects or to painting portraits of illustrious men of his day: Guizot, Charles Garnier, Edmond About.

Baudry's chief legacies were his mural decorations, which show imagination and an artistic gift for color, as may be seen in the frescoes in the Paris Court of Cassation, at the château de Chantilly, and some private residences the Hôtel Fould and Hôtel Paiva.

The decorations of the foyer of the Opera Garnier are regarded as his finest achievement. These, more than thirty paintings in all, and among them compositions figurative of dancing and music, occupied the painter for ten years. Baudry was a member of the Académie des beaux-arts, succeeding Jean-Victor Schnetz.

In the United States, Baudry painted two ceilings in the William K. Vanderbilt House in New York.

Baudry died in Paris in 1886. He is buried in Pere Lachaise Cemetery in Paris with a huge and highly sculptural monument.

== Honours ==
- 1878 : Member of the Royal Academy of Science, Letters and Fine Arts of Belgium

== Legacy ==
Two of his colleagues, Paul Dubois and Marius Jean Mercié, co-operating with his brother, architect Ambroise Baudry, erected his funeral monument in the Père Lachaise Cemetery in Paris (1890).

The statue of Baudry at La Roche-sur-Yon (1897) is by Jean-Léon Gérôme.

== Gallery ==
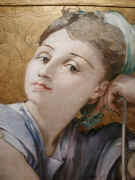
Euterpe (détail) at the Grand foyer of the Opera Palais.

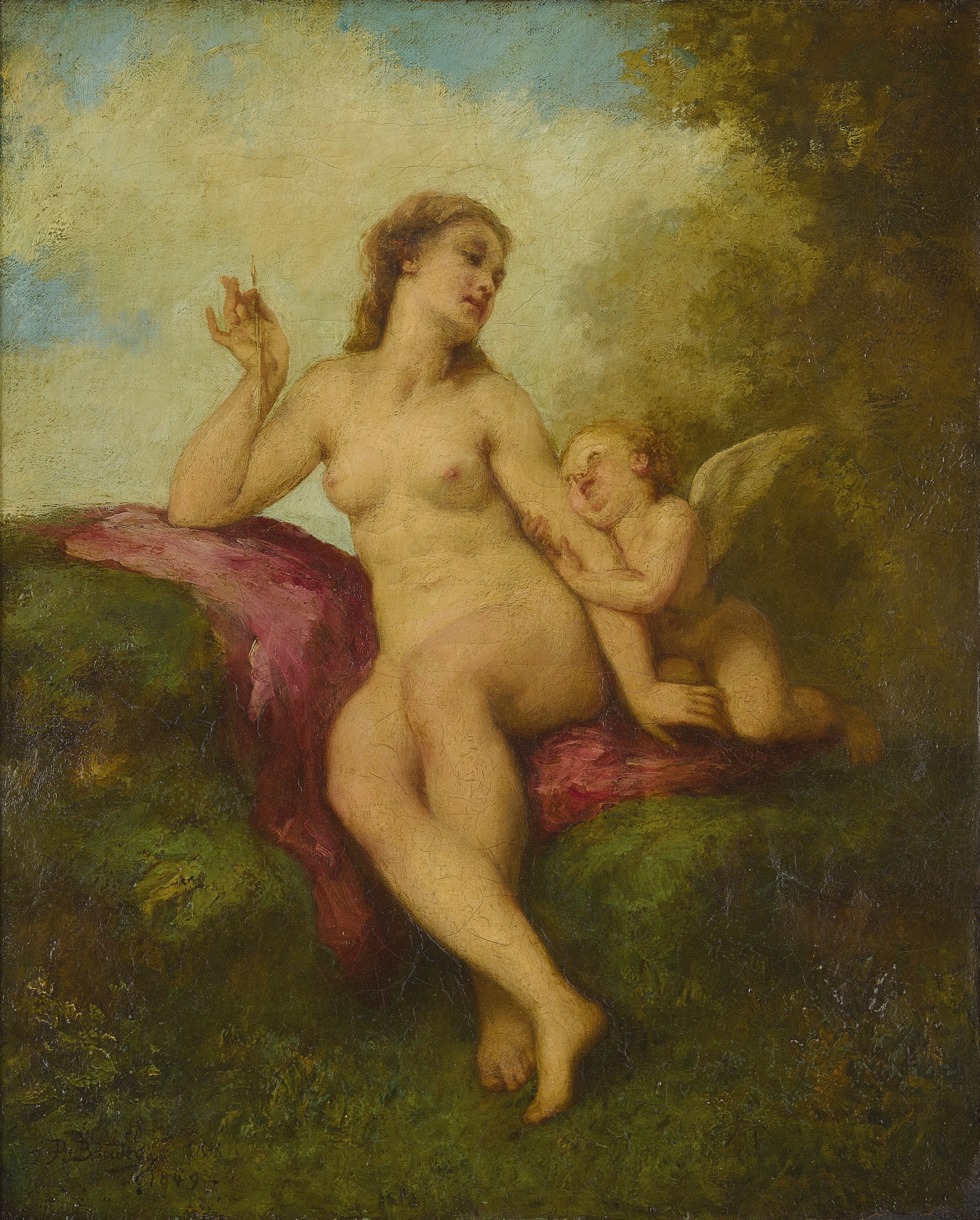
Venus and Cupid, 1849

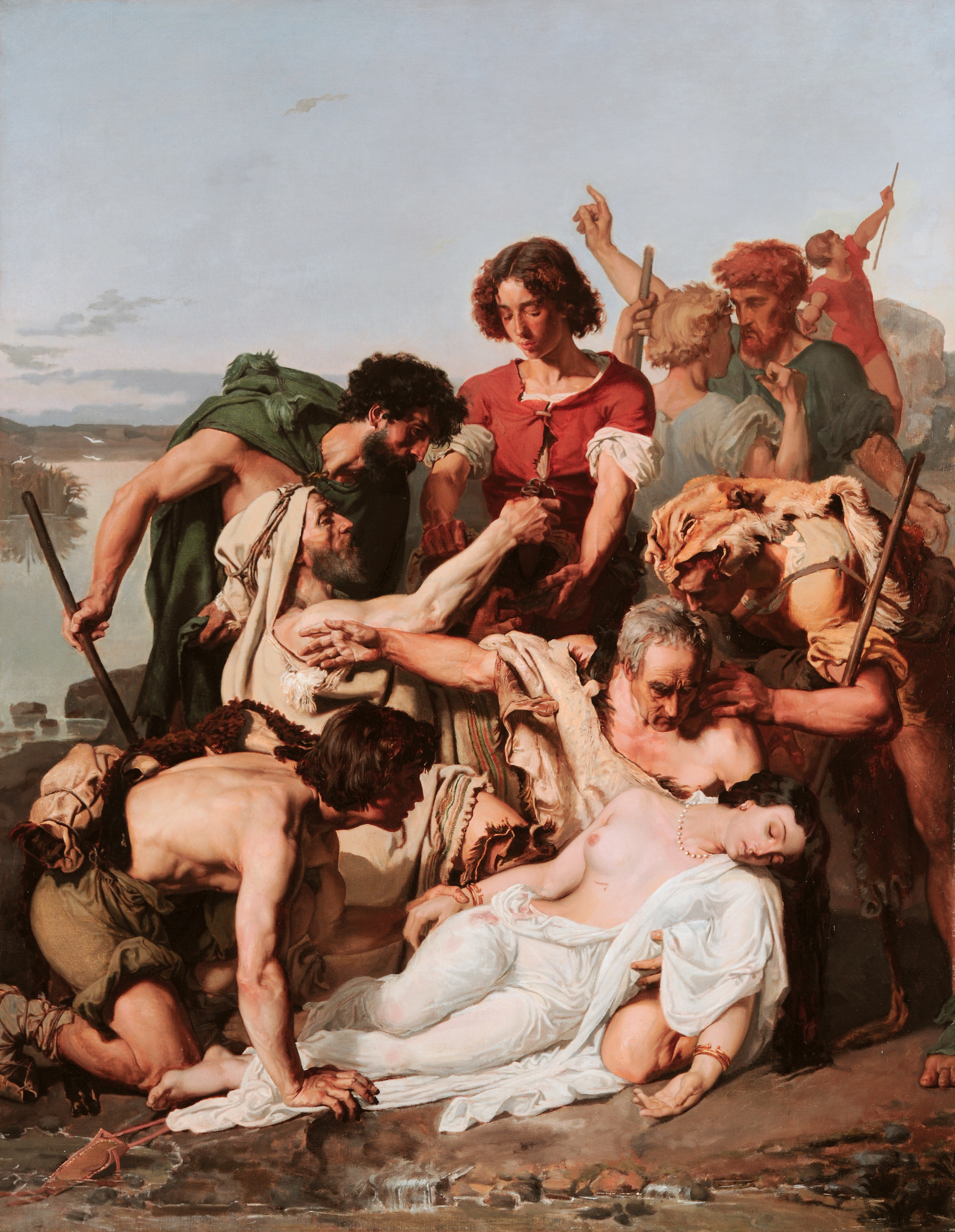
Zenobia Found by the Shepherds, 1850

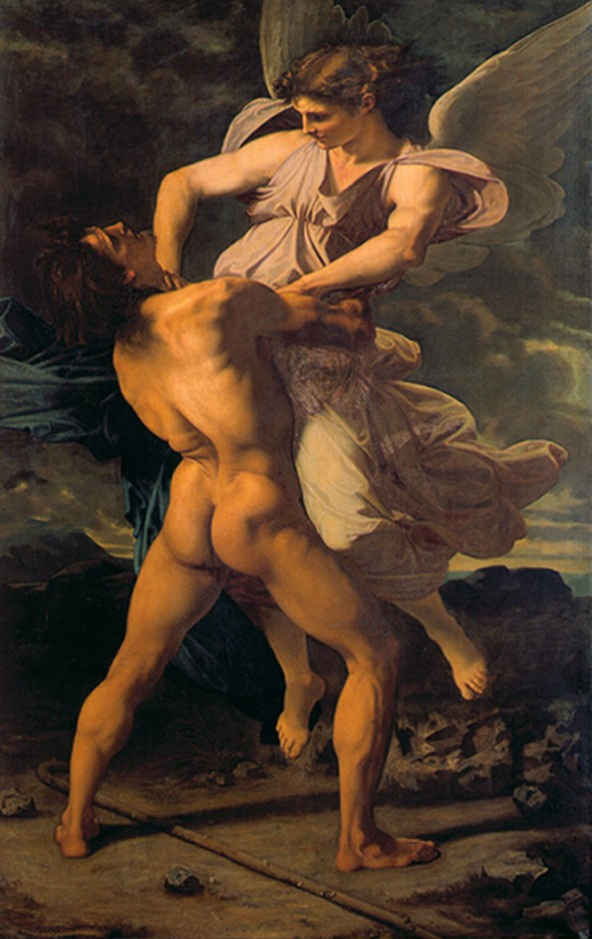
Jacob Wrestling
with the Angel, 1853

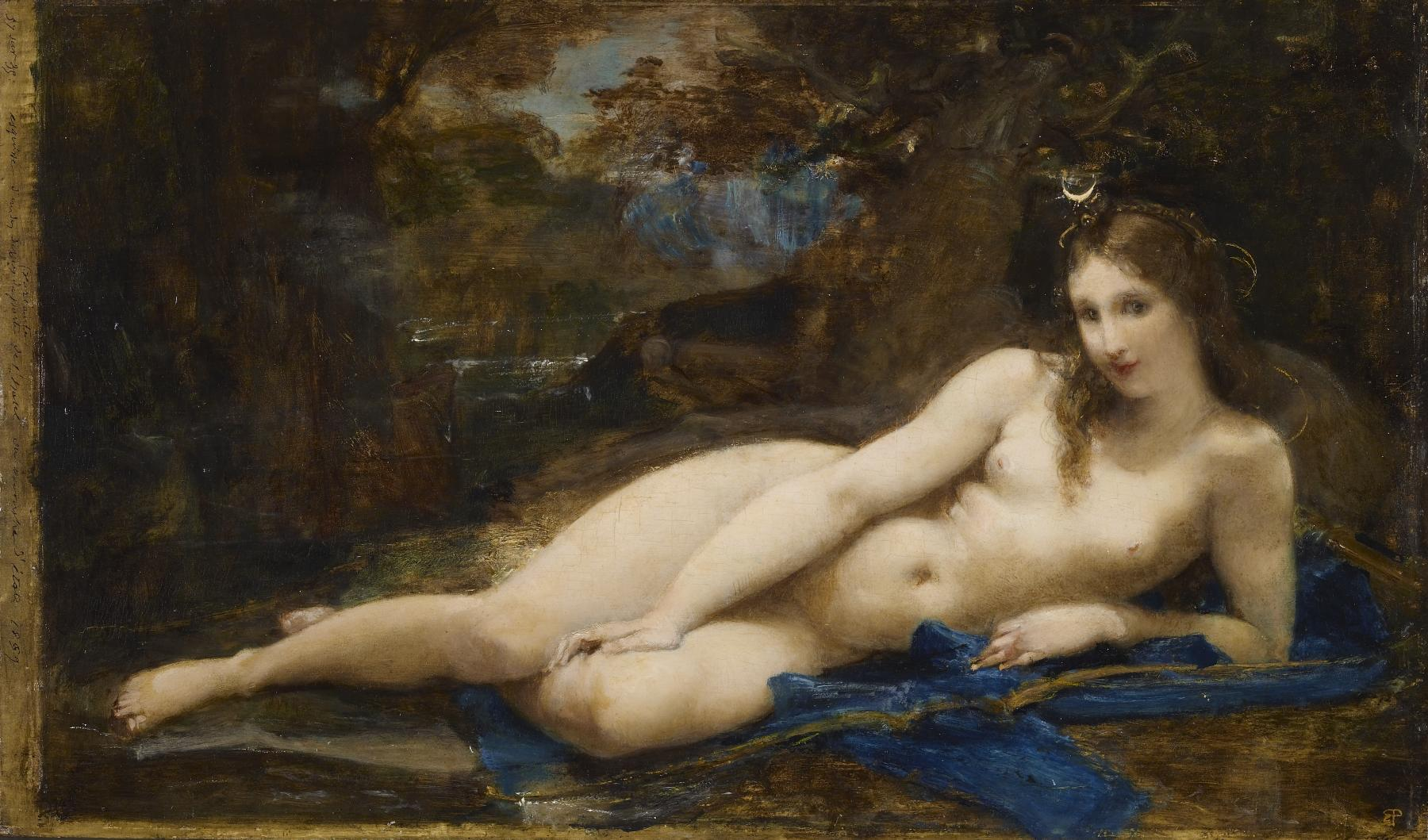
Diana Reposing, c. 1859, Walters Art Museum

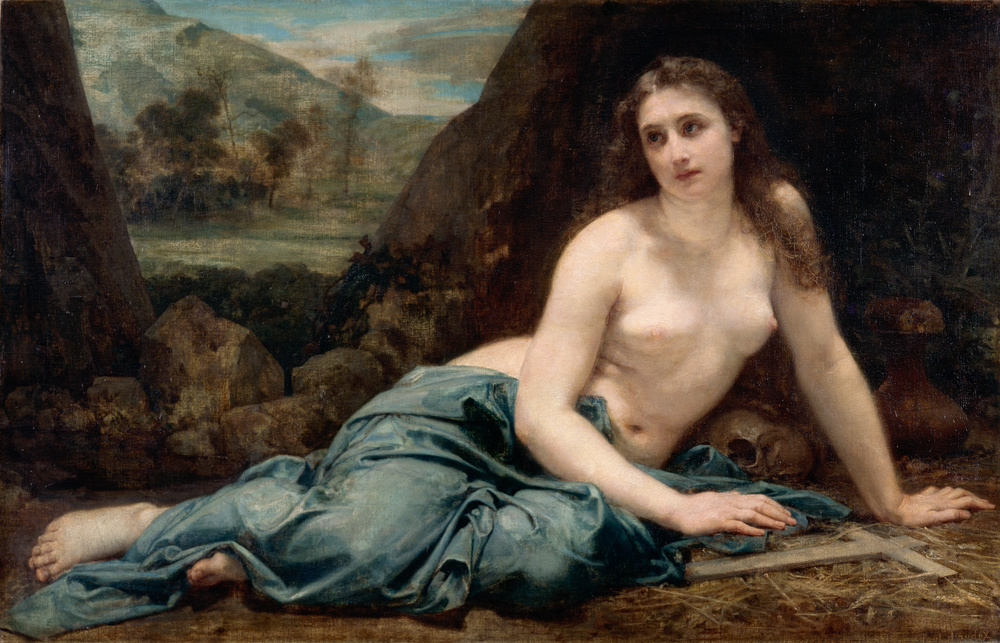
The Penitent Madeleine, 1859

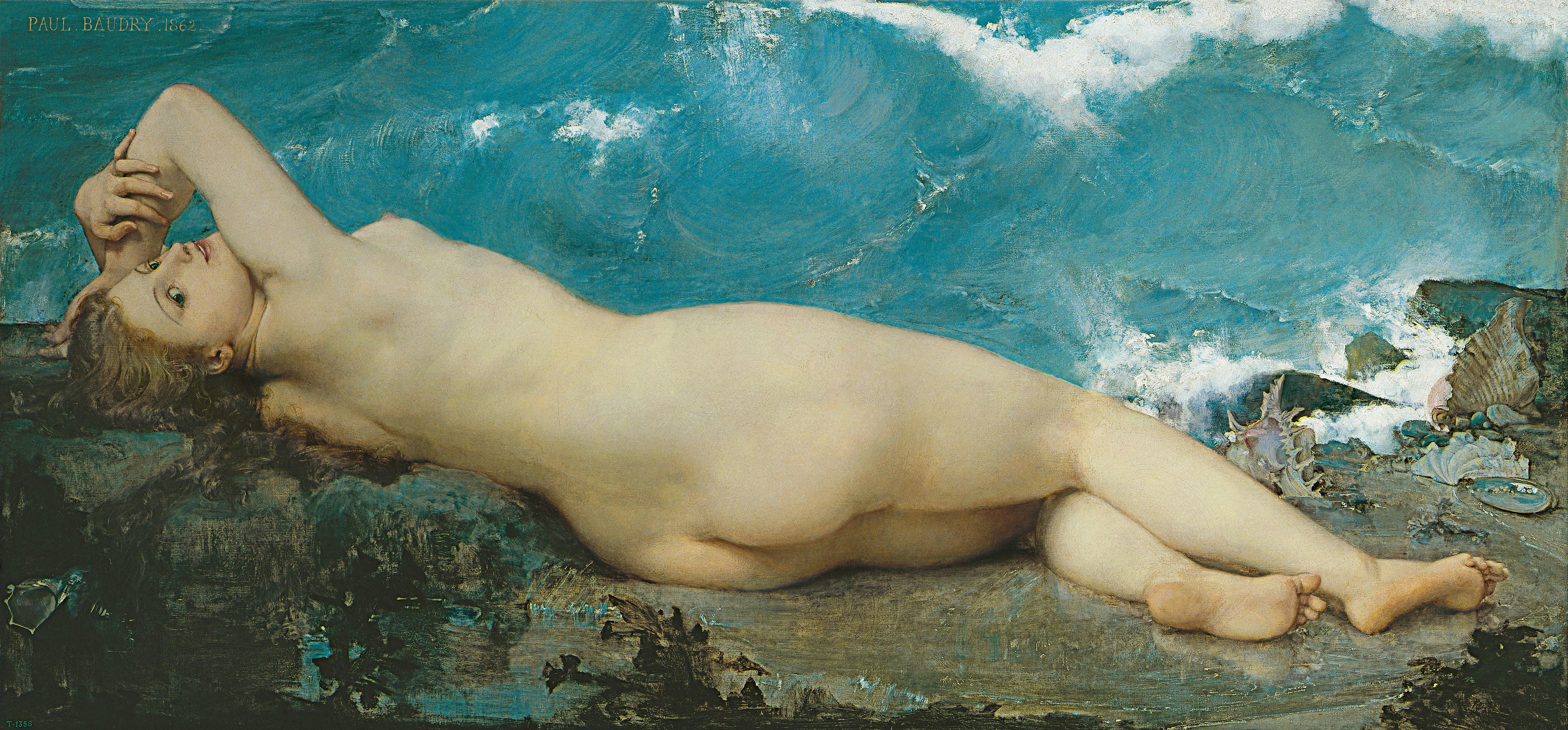
The Pearl and the Wave, 1862, Prado

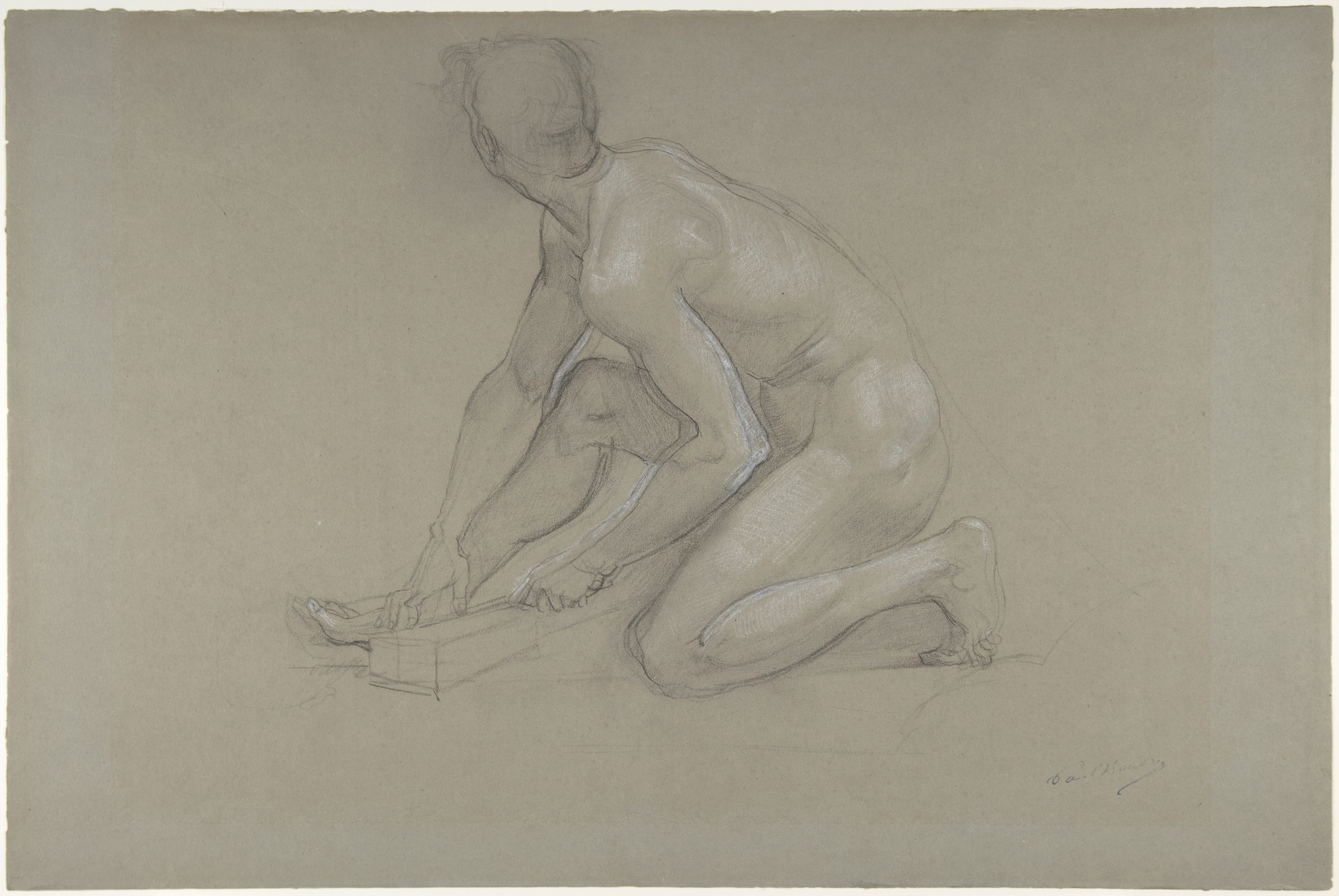
Crouching Nude Male Figure at the Metropolitan Museum of Art, 1864–74

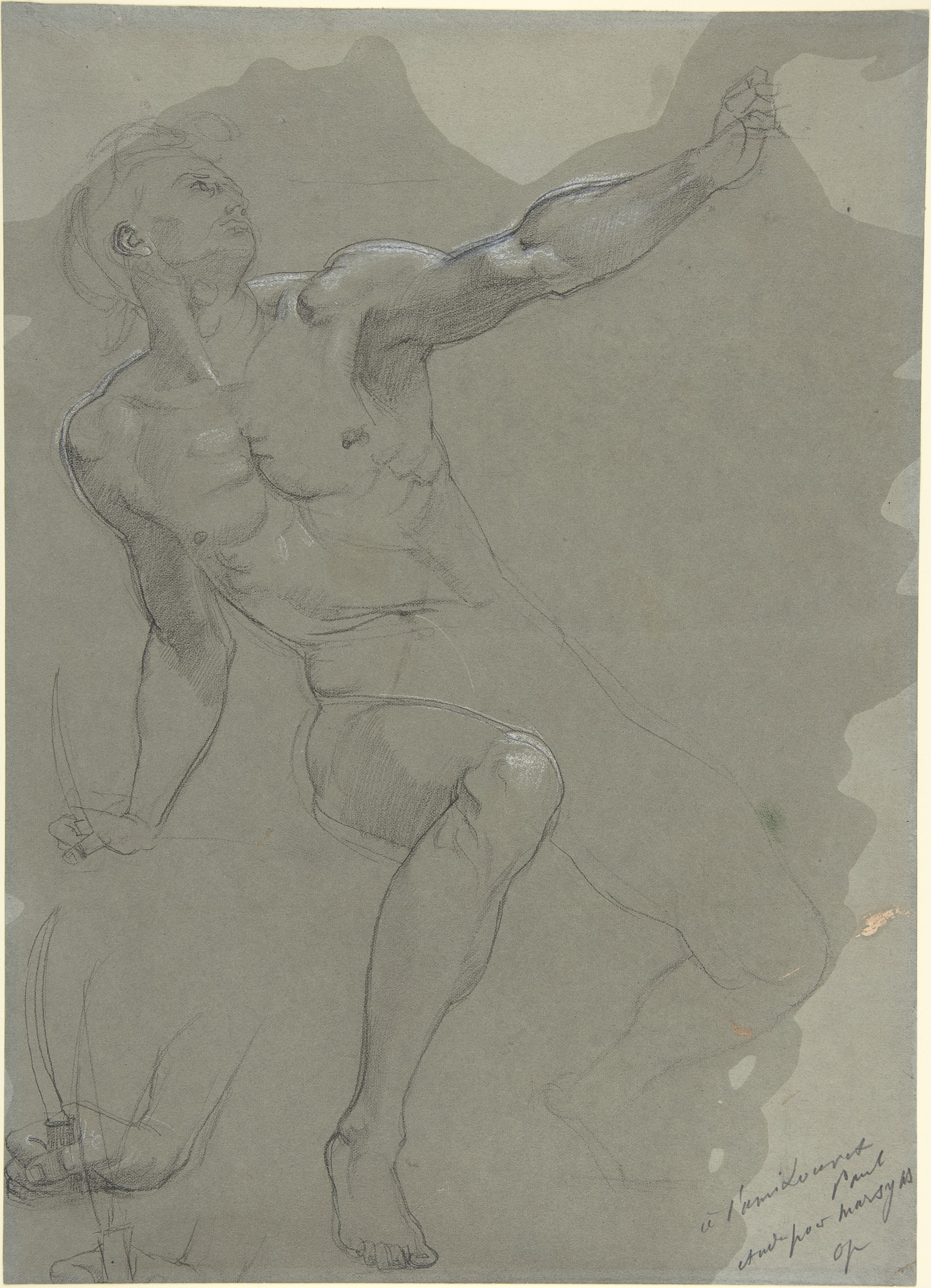
Seated Male Nude (recto); Crouching Male Nude (verso) at the Metropolitan Museum of Art, 1864–74

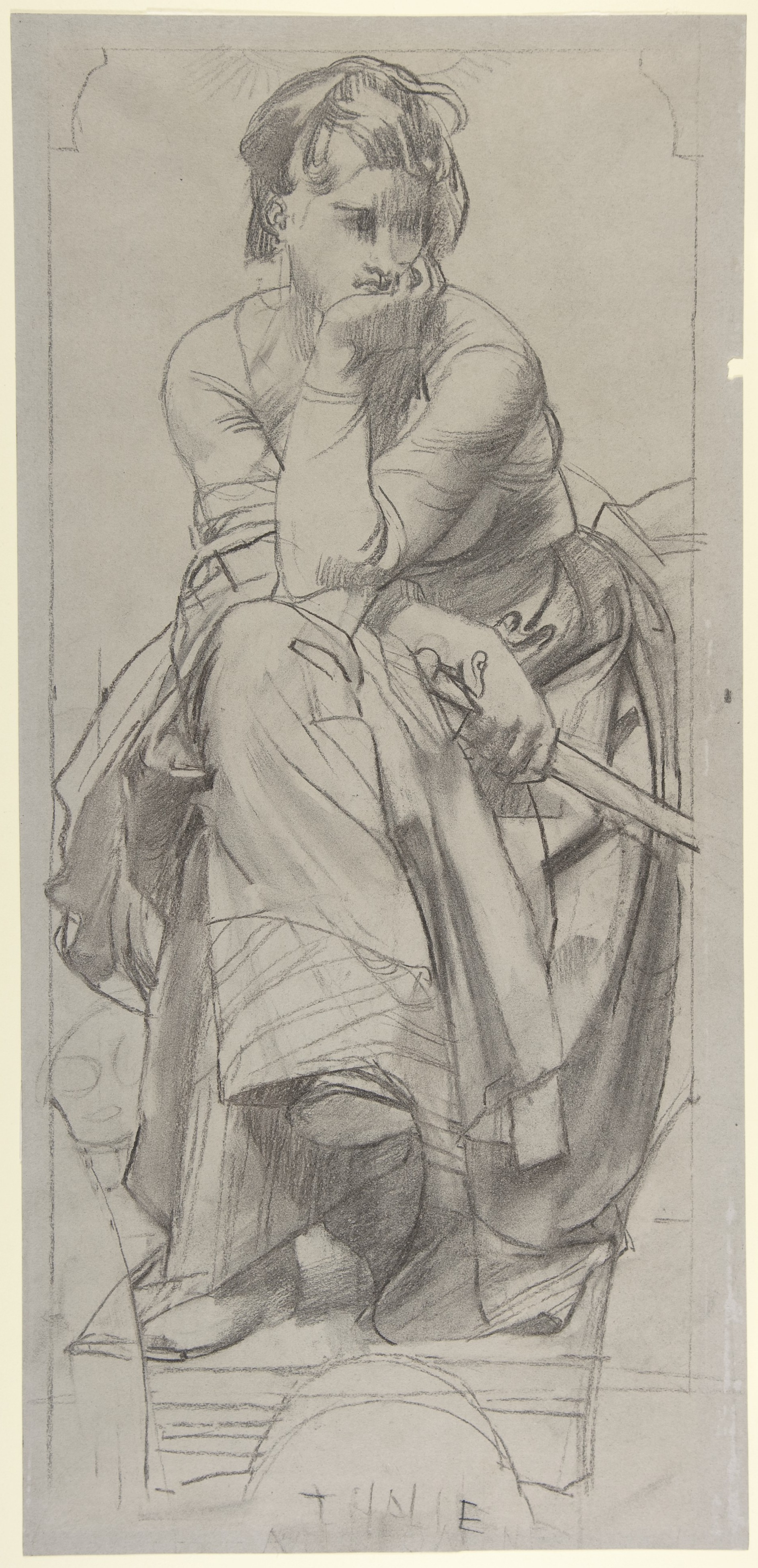
Study for the Muse Thalia at the Metropolitan Museum of Art

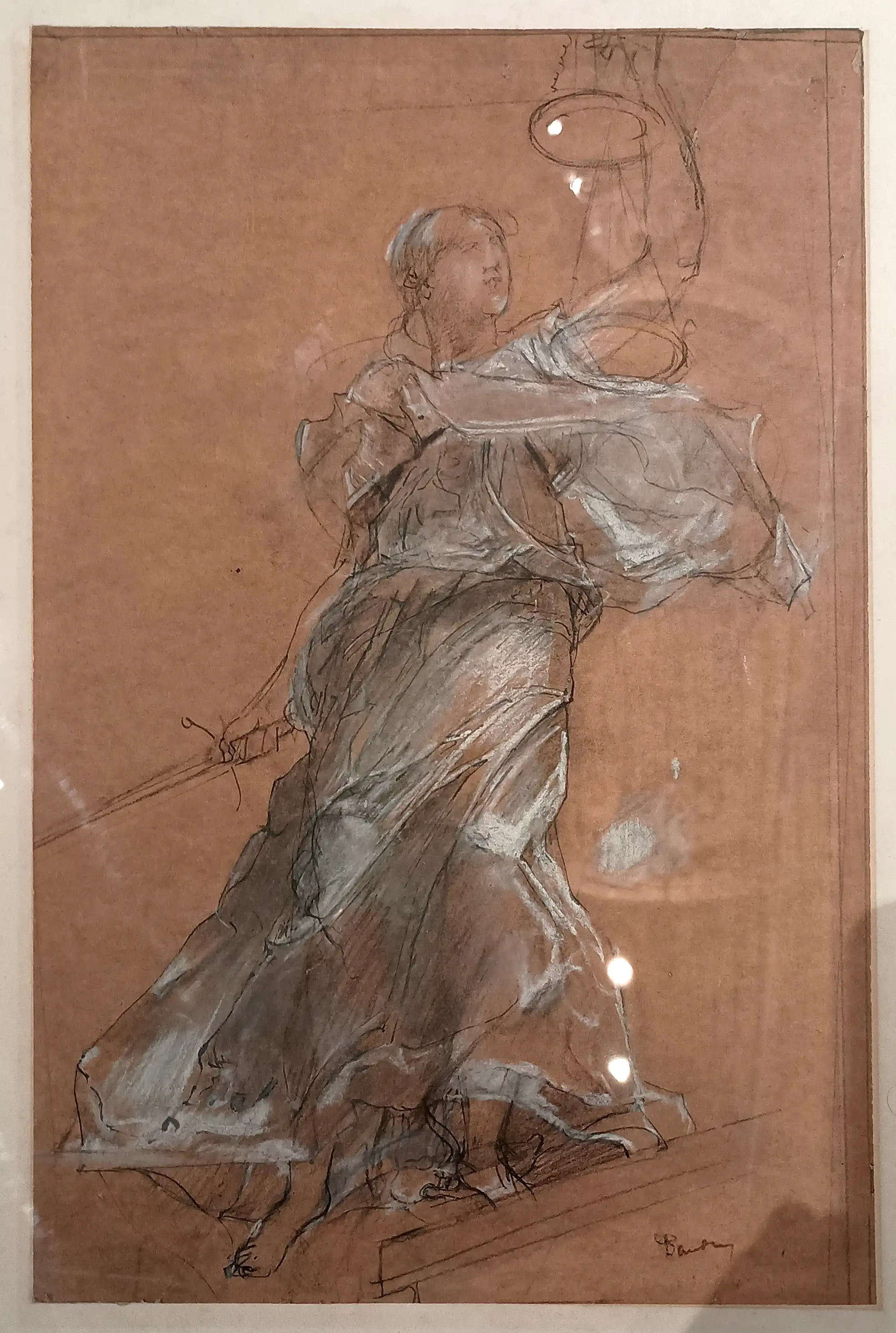
Allegorical Figure: Victory at the Museo Fortuny, Venice, Italy

== See also ==
- List of works by Paul Dubois (sculptor)
- List of works by Antonin Mercié

== References and sources ==
Sources

- H. Delaborde, Notice sur la vie et les ouvrages de Baudry (1886); Ch. Ephrussi, Baudry, sa vie et son oevre (1887). (H. FR.)
- Grunchec, P. (1985). The Grand Prix de Rome: Paintings from the École des Beaux-Arts, 1797-1863. Washington, DC: International Exhibitions Foundation. ISBN 0883970759.
