= Loyola Phoenix =

Student newspaper of Loyola University Chicago

The Loyola Phoenix
- Type: Student newspaper
- School: Loyola University Chicago
- Editor-in-chief: Julia Pentasuglio
- Managing editor: Faith Hug
- News editor: Paige Dillinger
- Opinion editor: Carlos Soto-Angulo
- Photo editor: Sophia Reass
- Other editors: News deputy: Ava Witherite; Opinion deputy: Sadie Harlan; Arts: Allison Treanor; Arts deputy: Kevin Stovich; Sports: Claire Bovino; Sports deputy: Alejandra Pina; Projects: Avaya Hall; Social Media: Skye Weaver; Newsletter: Andrew Quinn; Crossword: Millie Alt
- Founded: 1969
- City: Chicago, Illinois
- Website: https://loyolaphoenix.com

The Loyola Phoenix is the official newspaper of Loyola University Chicago in Chicago, Illinois. It is a student organization independent of the school's journalism program. Published on a weekly basis, it serves the students and faculty of the school, as well as the residents of the northside Chicago neighborhoods of Edgewater and Rogers Park.

The faculty adviser to the newspaper is Katie Drews, a former investigative reporter at the Better Government Association and the 2008-09 editor-in-chief of The Phoenix.

== History ==
The Phoenix's predecessor was founded in 1924 as the Loyola News. In 1969, the university sought to take editorial control of the Loyola News after the paper criticized the university's administration and the Vietnam War. The writers and staff members responded by shutting down the Loyola News, and founding The Loyola Phoenix, which initially operated as an independent business.

Following the newspaper's coverage of an alleged violent beating of a gay man on the CTA Red Line by a then-Loyola student in January 2010, The Phoenix was subpoenaed for their notes regarding the case. Attorneys for the criminal defendant also subpoenaed the Chicago Sun-Times and the Chicago Tribune. In the summer of 2011, however, judge Diane Cannon, blocked the subpoena, which set a new standard for student journalists, entitling them to the same protection as their professional counterparts. The ruling was the first decision in Illinois to apply the law to a student newspaper.
