= Have a Nice Life =

American post-punk band

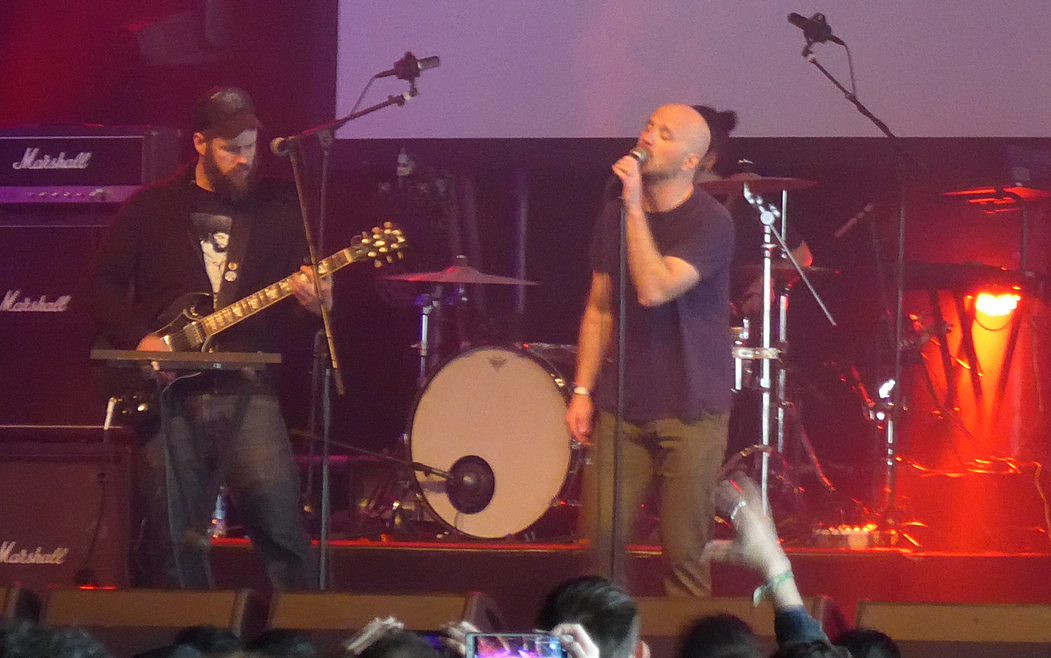
- Macuga (left) and Barrett (right) performing in 2019.

Background information
- Origin: Middletown, Connecticut, U.S.
- Genres: Post-punk; experimental rock; shoegaze; post-rock; gothic rock
- Years active: 2000–present
- Labels: Enemies List Home Recordings; The Flenser
- Spinoffs: Giles Corey; GATE; The Flowers of St. Francis; Black Wing; Nahvalr; Consumer
- Members: Dan Barrett; Tim Macuga
- Website: https://haveanicelifeband.com/

Have a Nice Life is an American rock band founded in Connecticut in 2000 by Dan Barrett and Tim Macuga.

The duo is best known for their 2008 debut album Deathconsciousness, which received little attention from professional music publications upon release but rose to "cult classic" status through its spread among online communities. Have a Nice Life began regularly performing with a full band in 2017, and their third album, Sea of Worry, was their first release to feature members of the live band.

== History ==
=== Early years & Deathconsciousness (2000 – 2009) ===
Have a Nice Life was formed in 2000 by Dan Barrett and Tim Macuga in Middletown Connecticut. They met at a punk rock gig whilst Barrett was studying at The University of Massachusetts in Amherst. They had both been in other bands at that point: Barrett played in post-hardcore outfit In Pieces, and Macuga was in ska punk group Danger Strangers. The pair bonded quickly, and began playing music together. They initially dubbed their project Junkyard Wars, before renaming it to Have A Nice Life a year later. For a while, Barrett described the duo "yelling the lyrics to Firestorm while playing acoustic at coffee shops and friends’ hardcore shows in dorm basements." Macuga commented that they had aimed to push then-popular emo music's sincerity into "absurd, grotesque territory".

The band's earliest demos recalled new wave music, and the gothic rock band The Sisters of Mercy. The band recorded their debut album Deathconsciousness on a budget of less than $1000, losing the original master files for the recordings in the process. It initially did not receive much recognition upon its 2008 release, but gained traction through discussions on online communities such as Sputnikmusic and 4chan, as well as via word of mouth. The band have since developed a cult audience as a result of Deathconsciousness' online popularity.

"The whole joke was that absolutely no one cared that we had Deathconsciousness, right?...The earliest real run of Deathconsciousness was just a CDR that had been spray-painted in my apartment hallway. Tim and I went to a show, handing out demos, just saying, 'Hey, we're in this band.' And I think as we were leaving, we found all the demos we'd handed out just lying on the ground. Since that point, Deathconsciousness has kind of never really been out of print. There's this constant wave of new people discovering the band—whether it's through memes, TikTok, or some playlist on Spotify that I had nothing to do with...That’s a new thing—something incredible for us—and something I'm very grateful for."

— Dan Barrett, The Flenser feature (2025)

=== Time of Land & The Unnatural World (2010 – 2018) ===
The band followed up Deathconsciousness with the extended play Time of Land, released as a free download in 2010. On January 27, 2014, Have a Nice Life released their second studio album The Unnatural World. According to Metacritic, the album has received generally favorable reviews.

In 2017, Have a Nice Life performed alongside the Chameleons at the Strange Day Festival in Olympia, Washington. Barrett and Macuga recruited Myke Cameron, Ian Gustafson, and Rich Otero to join their live ensemble for the performance. The group performed multiple warm-up shows in advance of the festival and ended the year with a sold out performance at Brooklyn Bazaar in New York City.

=== Sea of Worry & recent projects (2019 – Present) ===
The band performed two sets at the 2019 edition of the Dutch festival Roadburn including a performance of Deathconsciousness in full. On November 8, 2019, Have a Nice Life released their third studio album Sea of Worry, their first album to feature a full band.

Have a Nice Life performed a surprise secret set at the 2023 edition of the Roadburn Festival on the day before the ensemble was scheduled to perform as Giles Corey. Have a Nice Life also performed at Sick New World in Las Vegas on April 27, 2024.

The band released a cover of Low's song "When I Go Deaf" in April 2024 in tribute to the band's co-founder and drummer Mimi Parker. The song appeared on The Flenser's Low tribute album Your Voice Is Not Enough. In October 2024, Have a Nice Life was featured on the song "Car Wreck" by the band Bear Hands. Barrett was bandmates with Bear Hands bassist Val Loper in the band In Pieces before Have a Nice Life.

Outside of music, Barrett runs a real estate marketing agency and Macuga is a high school English/History teacher.

== Influences ==
Have a Nice Life's music draws from a diverse array of genres and styles. Critics have labelled their music variously as post-punk, post-rock, shoegaze, gothic rock, and experimental rock. Others have also noted their incorporation of elements of black metal, dark ambient, and industrial rock.

The band has mentioned the likes of My Bloody Valentine, Joy Division, New Order, Earth, Sunn O))), Xasthur, Lurker of Chalice, Nine Inch Nails, Swans, Sisters of Mercy, Kraftwerk, and the philosophy of Friedrich Nietzsche as influences on their music. Speaking on non-musical influences in their music, Macuga commented, "On the one hand, I wish I could express myself exactly that way and feel totally authentic and true. On the other hand, maybe we're already doing that on some level - we like Ligotti, bizarre religious history, pseudo spiritualism etc. - these are songs dreaming on things we enjoy dreaming on."

== Members ==
Current Members

- Dan Barrett
- Tim Macuga

Touring Members

- Rich Otero (drums)
- Ian Gustafson (keyboards/guitar)
- Joe Streeter (guitar)
- Myke Cameron (bass)
- Cody Kestigian (visuals)

== Discography ==
=== Studio albums ===
- Deathconsciousness (2008)
- The Unnatural World (2014)
- Sea of Worry (2019)

=== Compilation album ===
- Voids (2009)

=== Extended play ===
- Time of Land (2010)

=== Demos ===
- Have a Nice Life vs. You (2002)
- Demos 06 (2006)
- Powers of Ten (2006)

=== Singles ===
- "The Big Gloom" (2006), released promotionally as a free download on the band's Myspace account.
- "Bloodhail" (2008), released promotionally as a free download on the band's Myspace account.
- "I Don't Love" (2008), released promotionally as a free download on the band's Myspace account.
- "Sisyphus (Demo)" (2023)
- "When I Go Deaf" (2024), Low cover, part of the tribute album Your Voice Is Not Enough.

=== Live album ===
- Live at The Stone NYC (2010)

== See also ==
- Giles Corey (band)
- List of ambient artists
- List of shoegaze bands
- List of post-punk bands
- List of post-rock bands
- Music of Connecticut
