= Deathconsciousness =

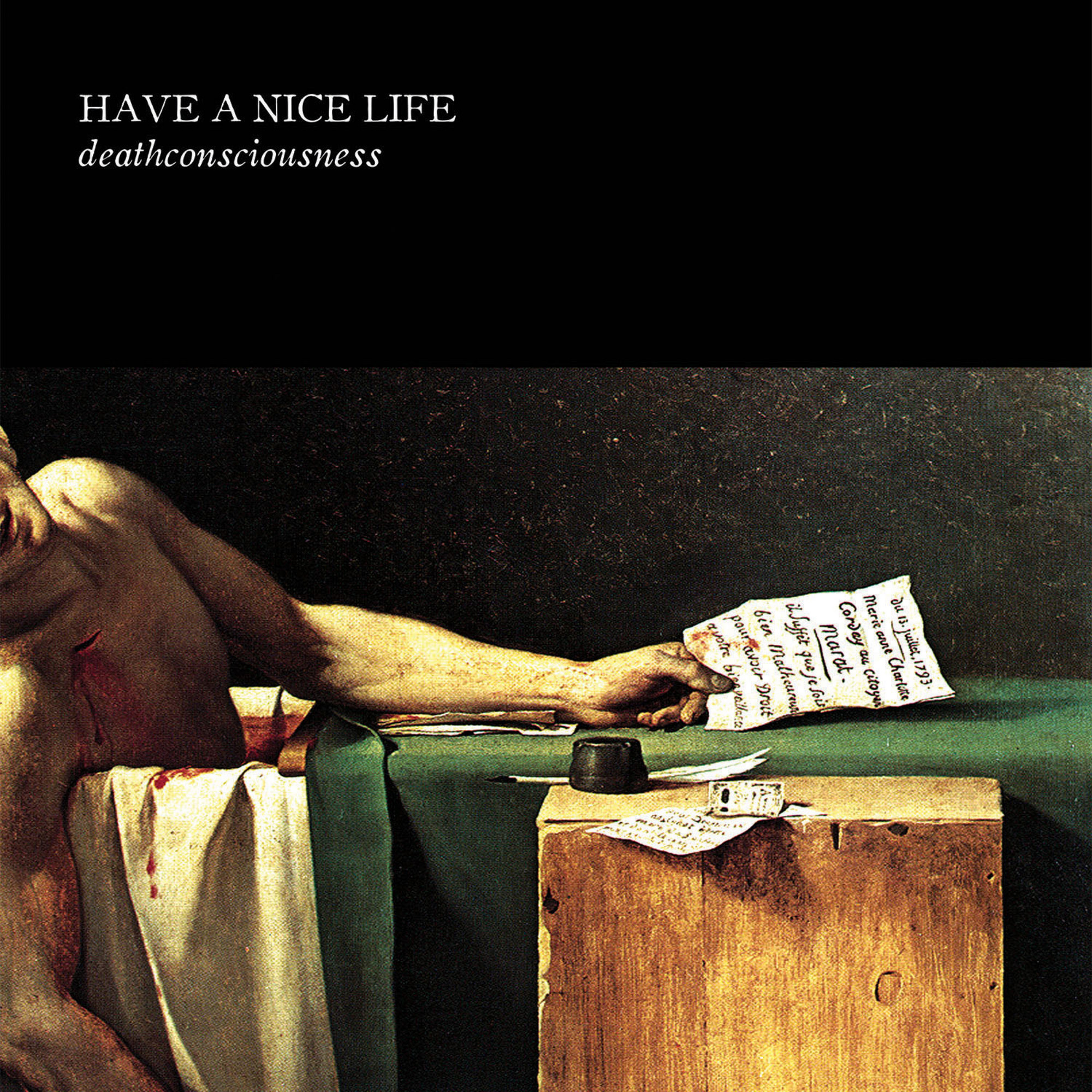

Studio album by Have a Nice Life
- Released: January 24, 2008
- Recorded: 2002–2007
- Genres: Shoegaze; post-punk; gothic rock
- Length: 84:35
- Labels: Enemies List Home Recordings; The Flenser

Have a Nice Life chronology
Deathconsciousness (2008)	Time of Land (2010)

2009 reissue album cover

Deathconsciousness is the debut album by the American rock duo Have a Nice Life, released on January 24, 2008, through Enemies List Home Recordings. It is a shoegaze and post-punk album characterized by a lo-fi production, dense soundscapes, and lyrics exploring themes such as death, depression, and existential despair. Recorded independently over five years on a budget of less than $1,000, it was released as a double album. Accompanied by a 70-page booklet outlining a fictional religious history, the original cover art features a darkened and cropped version of the Jacques-Louis David painting The Death of Marat (1793).

Initially overlooked by professional music publications, Deathconsciousness gained a substantial cult following in the years after its release, largely through online music communities such as 4chan's /mu/ board, Sputnikmusic, and Rate Your Music. Retrospective acclaim has focused on the album's emotional intensity, atmospheric cohesion, and do-it-yourself (DIY) ethos, with music critics describing it as one of the most emotionally devastating records of its era.

== Background ==
Dan Barrett and Tim Macuga met when their previous bands played shows together, leading to a musical connection. While Barrett was studying abroad, the two began collaborating via email, bonding over a shared interest in music and themes. After returning to the United States, they would form Have a Nice Life in Middletown, Connecticut. Their early performances at college coffeehouses and basement shows were characterized by attempts to make the audience uncomfortable. They gained a reputation for performing what Kerrang! later described as "morbid acoustic" songs, frequently centered on themes of death and dying, though with a more absurdist perspective in their initial work.

== Recording ==
The recording process for Deathconsciousness was informal and low-budget, with the total cost reportedly under $1,000. Much of the album was recorded using rudimentary equipment such as a microphone built into Barrett's laptop, a secondhand keyboard, and a toy piano. Because of physical distance and work obligations, the duo worked on the album sporadically, sometimes only a few times per month. As a result, Deathconsciousness was recorded over approximately five years, from 2002 to 2007. Initially, there was no plan for a cohesive double album; the concept only began to take shape around 2005 or 2006.

"The Big Gloom" was the first song recorded for Deathconsciousness with their initial setup. Anecdotes from the recording sessions include the origin of tracks like "Holy Fucking Shit 40,000", which was based on an older acoustic song by Barrett, and a mistaken belief by Macuga that ghostly noises captured during the recording of "There Is No Food" were supernatural—later revealed to be laughter from his roommate during a dinner date. Songs were typically initiated by Barrett, who composed acoustic or quieter core ideas and handled the album's production and engineering. Macuga contributed by layering additional instrumentation, including guitar, bass guitar, synthesizers, and programmed percussion. Their working process was informal and intuitive, with minimal structured planning. The original master recordings of the album were lost during a hard drive crash, leaving the band with only 192 kbit/s MP3 files. A significant turning point in the album's development was the death of Barrett's father; he later stated that the event gave sharper focus to the album's themes and influenced the content of the accompanying booklet.

== Musical style ==
=== Overview ===
Deathconsciousness is very closely tied to what was going on in my life at the time of its recording. It emerged naturally from my writing. It's the opposite of the predominant cultural attitude towards death in the West, namely that we should pretend it doesn't exist. It does exist, and for a long time it was all I could talk or think about. That naturally influenced the music, lyrics, even the packaging.

— Dan Barrett, Scene Point Blank, 2010

Music critics have categorized Deathconsciousness as a shoegaze, (Note: Attributed to multiple references:) post-punk, and gothic rock album with influences of black metal, post-rock, dark ambient, and industrial music. Robin Smith of The Quietus has used the term "doomgaze" to describe the album's fusion of heavy and ethereal styles. Mirco Leier of laut.de compared its sound to that of Godspeed You! Black Emperor, My Bloody Valentine, Beach House, and Swans. Its tone was described by Hayden Goodridge of Paste as "apocalyptic".

Many tracks unfold slowly, building expansive soundscapes that emphasize atmosphere and texture. The production features heavily reverberated and often obscured vocals, dense layers of distortion, and a lo-fi aesthetic. Deathconsciousness is thematically centered on mortality, depression, anxiety, and alienation. It is a concept album; Jason Heller of Pitchfork identified its thesis as the view that "existence is bleak, gallows humor undergirds it, and sometimes wallowing in that sick paradox is the best revenge". The music has been described as emotionally intense and melancholic, with Dakota West Foss of Sputnikmusic calling it "the closest thing to depression in music form".

=== Songs ===
"Bloodhail"
A sample of the second track, "Bloodhail", demonstrates the album's shoegaze influences and dense, layered sound.

The opening track "A Quick One Before the Eternal Worm Devours Connecticut" is an instrumental eight-minute ambient track, whose expansive and atmospheric character contrasts with the heavier "Bloodhail", where the bass introduces a darker and more oppressive mood. The guitar parts were recorded in a bathtub, according to Macuga. It ends with a repeated, echo-laden vocal loop: "I just don't know". "Bloodhail" is a shoegaze track and is built around heavy bass and layered textures. Lyrically, it expresses themes of disillusionment and spiritual exhaustion. It includes a drum machine that has been described by Alessandro Nalon and Alberto Asquini of Ondarock as reminiscent of the Sisters of Mercy. The song references material from the album's accompanying booklet, presenting a narrative from the perspective of a fallen deity. "The Big Gloom" is a dense, shoegaze-inspired piece featuring reverb-heavy vocals and relentless percussion. It was noted by Vice for its emotional rawness and sonic density. "Hunter" is guitar-driven track with melodic riffs. The song presents a narrative centered on a figure who ascends a tower of people in an attempt to shoot down God with arrows, a character referred to as "the Hunter" who recurs throughout the album.

"Telephony" has been described by Loyola Phoenix's Audrey Hogan as "sonically harsher" than the album's earlier "A Quick One Before the Eternal Worm Devours Connecticut", featuring a persistent, high-pitched metallic snare drum accompanied by deep electric guitar strumming throughout. "Who Would Leave Their Son Out in the Sun?" blends reverb-heavy instrumentation, while "There Is No Food" consists of ambient drones and distorted vocal fragments. The lyrics of "Waiting for Black Metal Records to Come in the Mail" are inspired by ecological themes and critical of corporate greed and governmental exploitation. Musically, it is a post-punk-influenced song and draws on the instrumentation of punk and rock-oriented groups. "Holy Fucking Shit: 40,000" begins with an electropop section and a minimalist Casio preset before erupting into harsh noise, industrial elements, and a heavier rhythm, concluding with an acoustic guitar passage. Lyrically, the track has been described as a depiction of psychological distress, drawing on references to The Terminator (1984) and Warhammer 40,000 (1987) to explore themes of determinism through science fiction metaphors.

"The Future" is an instrumental piece with synthetic drums and sparse electronics. Its upbeat rhythm contrasts with the underlying bleakness of its tone. The track suggests a pessimistic outlook on the future, where technological progress fails to address existential suffering. "Deep, Deep" blends synthesizers and distorted guitar. "I Don't Love" features heavy distortion, subdued percussion, and layered vocals. The lyrics deal with emotional numbness and the inability to feel love, often interpreted as a portrayal of depression. The album's closing track "Earthmover" spans over eleven minutes and builds from acoustic strumming to a climactic wall of sound. It features layered guitars, choral textures, and ambient noise. The lyrics describe unstoppable golems as metaphors for overwhelming existential burdens. The track ends with a prolonged instrumental passage. A "bass drop" near the end was an unplanned moment captured when Macuga physically threw down his bass guitar.

== Packaging ==
The album's title Deathconsciousness expresses a perspective that stands in direct contrast to what the band identified as the dominant Western cultural tendency to avoid or deny the reality of death. The original cover art for Deathconsciousness features a darkened and cropped version of the painting The Death of Marat (1793) with a slightly increased contrast, painted by Jacques-Louis David during the French Revolution. In an interview with Revolver, Barrett explained that the band's limited budget influenced them to explore public domain artwork.

Following the loss of Barrett's father, he used part of the life insurance payment to travel across Europe, during which he drafted the first version of the album's 70-page booklet. The text, completed upon his return, refers to a nameless religious history professor from the University of Massachusetts Amherst as its author. It also presents a fictional history centered on a 13th-century religious figure named Antiochus and an apocalyptic Christian sect. Influenced by Mark Z. Danielewski's House of Leaves (2000), the booklet was conceived as a companion to the music.

== Release ==
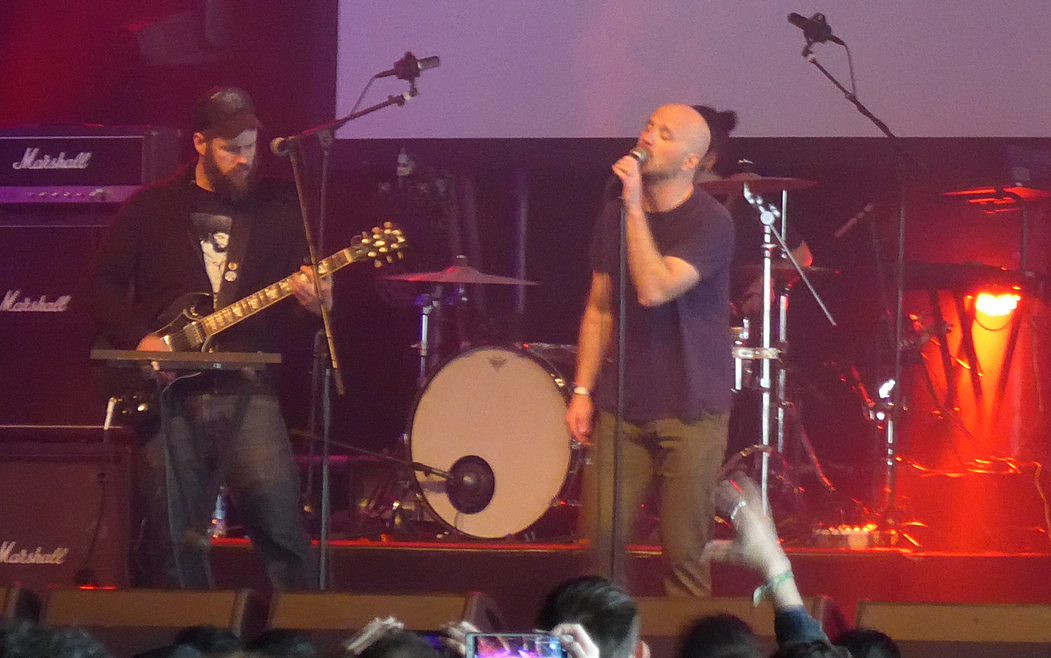
Macuga (left) and Barrett performing at Roadburn Festival in 2019

Deathconsciousness was released on January 24, 2008, under the label Enemies List Home Recordings. Released as a double album, it features two discs entitled "The Plow That Broke the Plains" and "The Future". The album was reissued in 2009 by Enemies List, re-pressing the album on vinyl and CD, with new cover art. Another reissue of Deathconsciousness was released September 17, 2014, by Enemies List and The Flenser. By 2019, the album had been re-issued seven times.

The album received little to no mainstream attention from music publications upon release. Though the duo expected it to linger in obscurity, the album has, in the years following its release, gained a substantial cult following, especially in online music communities such as Sputnikmusic, Rate Your Music, and 4chan's /mu/, the website's imageboard for musical discussion. In 2019, Kerrang! said that the album's growing mystique was amplified by the band's anonymity and its ominous liner notes, which, as the magazine noted, contributed to its status as "the stuff of internet myth". The album is also acclaimed on the Reddit community r/Indieheads. This recognition came as a complete shock to the duo, who initially believed the album would simply be "a pile of CD-Rs in [Dan's] mom's garage" and that "absolutely no one will care" about their music. The band performed the album in its entirety in 2019 at the Dutch experimental music festival Roadburn.

== Reception and legacy ==
Professional ratings
Review scores
Source	Rating
laut.de	5/5 stars
Ondarock	8.0/10
Sputnikmusic	(2008) (2009)

On its release, Sputnikmusic gave it four-and-a-half stars out of five. Another review from Dakota West Foss gave it five stars. At the same website, the album placed at number 94 on its "Top 100 Albums of the Decade" list. Metal Storm praised the album as "easily the most important album of the year so far" despite acknowledging its lack of originality and occasional excess length. He described the album as a "lo-fi masterpiece" that evokes a harrowing and overwhelmingly somber mood, stating that it "makes funeral doom records sound like Barney's theme song".

In retrospective reviews, Mirco Leier from laut.de described the album as "the opposite of an antidepressant", highlighting its bleak emotional tone and intense portrayal of depressive states. He noted that Deathconsciousness is not conventionally sad, but instead evokes a sense of emotional numbness akin to a "musical black hole". Leier characterized the album as a vacuum of feeling, where grief and desolation manifest as overwhelming weight, likening it to "music-turned-inability-to-feel-anything". Loyola Phoenix's Audrey Hogan described it as an emotionally overwhelming and thematically dense work that defined a difficult period of her life. Reflecting on the album's impact, Hogan emphasized how tracks such as "The Big Gloom" could evoke a "deeply primal, all-consuming sadness" from the opening notes. She noted that the album encapsulates "a deeply depressed state" through its fusion of many genres, calling it "a feat of low-budget recording and post-anything instrumentals".

Holden Seidlitz of Stereogum described Deathconsciousness as "morbid, ambitious, densely orchestrated, by turns barbituric and corrosive", characterizing it as an apocalyptic work shaped by the awareness of mortality. Seidlitz highlighted its reputation as a frequent contender for "saddest album of all time", alongside Mount Eerie's A Crow Looked at Me (2017), and remarked that it is "the kind of music you listen to when you want more weight". Writing for Vice, John Hill described the album as "arguably one of the greatest double LPs of all time", emphasizing its stylistic range and emotional resonance. Hill praised the album's do-it-yourself (DIY) ethos and lo-fi production, describing it as "a record made by an everyman, even though it's a work of near-genius", quoting Jonathan Tuite, owner of The Flenser. Mike LeSuer of Flood Magazine described the album as a "meme-worthy cultural moment". "Earthmover" has since become one of the band's most celebrated works, and it gained renewed popularity through viral social media content. The opening track "A Quick One Before the Eternal Worm Devours Connecticut" was sampled by the producer John Mello for a song by the American rapper Lil Peep on a track titled "Shiver" (2016). For the week ending April 18, 2024, "A Quick One Before the Eternal Worm Devours Connecticut" debuted at number 30 on the TikTok Billboard Top 50 chart.

== Track listing ==
All tracks are written by Dan Barrett and Tim Macuga.

The Plow That Broke the Plains
No.	Title	Length
1.	"A Quick One Before the Eternal Worm Devours Connecticut"	7:52
2.	"Bloodhail"	5:38
3.	"The Big Gloom"	8:03
4.	"Hunter"	9:43
5.	"Telephony"	4:36
6.	"Who Would Leave Their Son Out in the Sun?"	5:17
7.	"There Is No Food"	4:00
Total length:		45:09

The Future
No.	Title	Length
8.	"Waiting for Black Metal Records to Come in the Mail"	6:15
9.	"Holy Fucking Shit: 40,000"	6:26
10.	"The Future"	3:48
11.	"Deep, Deep"	5:23
12.	"I Don't Love"	6:06
13.	"Earthmover"	11:28
Total length:		39:26
