= Circa Survive discography =

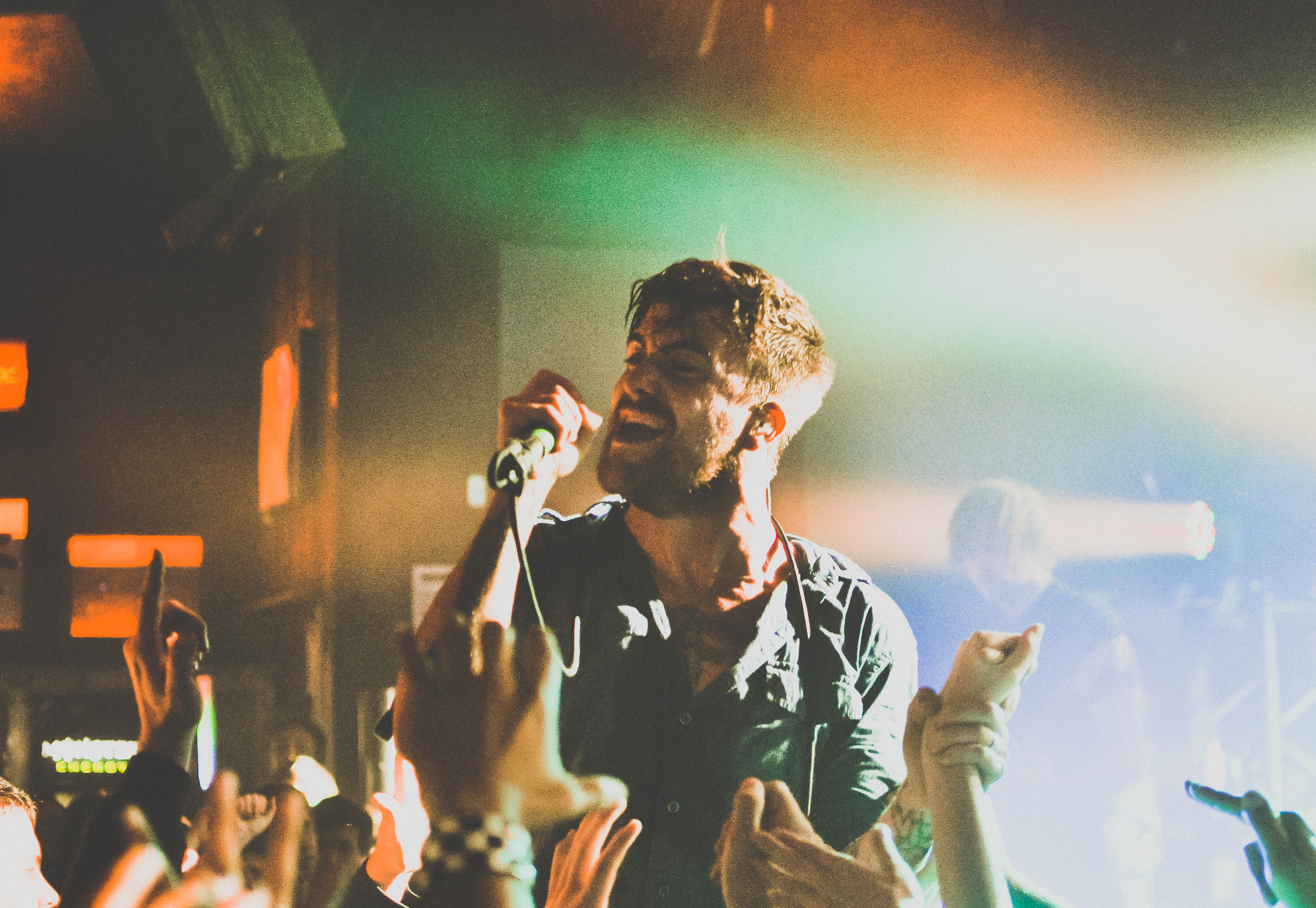
- Circa Survive performing in 2011
- Studio albums: 6
- EPs: 3
- Tribute albums: 3
- Singles: 16
- Music videos: 17

The American rock band Circa Survive has released six studio albums, five extended plays, and 16 singles. They have also contributed songs to three different Nirvana tribute compilations.

== Studio albums ==
List of studio albums, with selected chart positions
Title	Album details	Peak chart positions			
Title	Album details	US	US Rock	US Alt.	US Mtl.
Juturna	Released: April 19, 2005 (US); Label: Equal Vision Records; Formats: CD, Digital, LP	183	—	—	—
On Letting Go	Released: May 29, 2007 (US); Label: Equal Vision Records; Formats: CD	24	7	—	—
Blue Sky Noise	Released: April 20, 2010 (US); Label: Atlantic Records; Formats: CD, Digital, LP	11	3	1	2
Violent Waves	Released: August 28, 2012 (US); Label: Self-released; Formats: CD, Digital, LP	15	4	3	—
Descensus	Released: November 24, 2014 (US); Label: Sumerian Records; Formats: CD, Digital, LP	50	6	4	3
The Amulet	Released: September 22, 2017 (US); Label: Hopeless Records; Formats: CD, LP	26	5	4	—
Live Sky Noise	Released: June 4, 2021 (US); Label: Self-released; Formats: LP	—	—	—	—
"—" denotes a recording that did not chart or was not released in that territory.

== Extended plays ==
List of extended plays, with selected chart positions
Title	Album details	Peak chart positions			
Title	Album details	US	US Rock	US Alt.	US Mtl.
The Inuit Sessions	Released: March 18, 2005 (US); Label: Equal Vision Records; Formats: CD	—	—	—	—
B-Sides	Released: January 5, 2010 (US); Label: Equal Vision Records; Formats: 7"	—	—	—	—
Appendage	Released: November 30, 2010 (US); Label: Atlantic Records; Formats: CD, Digital, LP	—	47	—	12
A Dream About Love	Released: October 22, 2021; Label: Rise Records; Formats: CD, Digital, LP	—	—	—	—
A Dream About Death	Released: February 4, 2022; Label: Rise Records; Formats: CD, Digital, LP	—	—	—	—
"—" denotes a recording that did not chart or was not released in that territory.

== Singles ==
List of singles, showing year released and album name
Title	Year	Album
"Act Appalled"	2005	Juturna
"In Fear and Faith"	2005	Juturna
"The Difference Between Medicine and Poison Is in the Dose"	2007	On Letting Go
"Get Out"	2010	Blue Sky Noise
"Imaginary Enemy"	2010	Blue Sky Noise
"I Felt Free"	2010	Blue Sky Noise
"Suitcase"	2012	Violent Waves
"Sharp Practice"	2012	Violent Waves
"Schema"	2014	Descensus
"Child of the Desert"	2014	Descensus
"Lustration"	2017	The Amulet
"Rites of Investiture"	2017	The Amulet
"The Amulet"	2017	The Amulet
"Premonition of the Hex"	2017	The Amulet
"Imposter Syndrome"	2021	A Dream About Love
"Electric Moose"	2022	A Dream About Death

== Other appearances ==
List of compilation and cover appearances, showing year released and album name
Title	Year	Album
"Battle, My Love"	2012	Hurricane Sandy Benefit EP
"Scentless Apprentice" (Nirvana cover)	2014	In Utero, in Tribute, in Entirety
"Drain You" (Nirvana cover)	2015	Whatever Nevermind
"Love Buzz" (Shocking Blue cover)	2016	Doused in Mud, Soaked in Bleach
"Act Appalled" (acoustic)	2019	Punk Goes Acoustic Vol. 3

== Music videos ==
List of music videos, showing year released and director
Title	Year	Director(s)
"Act Appalled"	2006	
"In Fear and Faith"	2006	Sitcom Soldiers
"The Difference Between Medicine and Poison Is in the Dose"	2007	
"Get Out"	2010	Josh Mond
"Imaginary Enemy"	2010	Ryan Rothermel
"Suitcase"	2012	Dannel Escallon
"Sharp Practice"	2012	Mortimer Jones
"Schema"	2014	Frankie Nasso
"Only the Sun"	2014	
"Child of the Desert"	2015	Andrew Swartz
"Lustration"	2017	Matt Stawski
"Rites of Investiture"	2017	Jonathan Michaels
"The Amulet"	2017	Hank Ford
"Premonition of the Hex"	2017	Josh Call
"Flesh and Bone"	2018	Sibs Shongwe-La Mer
"Imposter Syndrome"	2021	Bob Sweeney
"Electric Moose"	2022	Katharine White
