= Colin Frangicetto =

American musician and painter

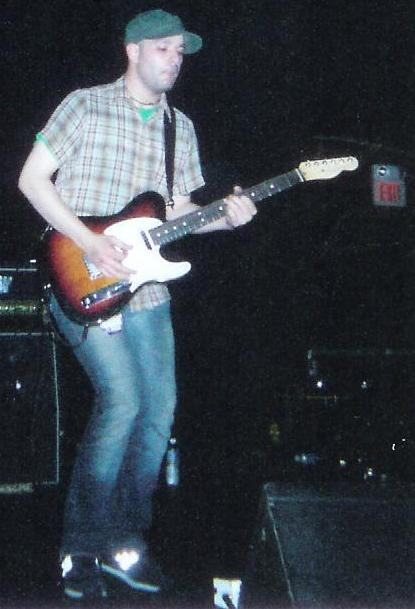

Background information
- Also known as: Psychic Babble
- Born: July 3, 1981 (age 45)
- Origin: Langhorne, Pennsylvania, United States
- Genres: Indie rock, alternative rock, progressive rock, post-hardcore
- Instruments: Vocals, guitar, drums
- Labels: Atlantic, Yenta, Eulogy Recordings, Equal Vision, Sumerian

Colin Frangicetto (born July 3, 1981) is a musician and painter from Langhorne, Pennsylvania. He is currently one of two guitarists in the experimental rock outfit Circa Survive, sole musician in Psychic Babble and previously in the band This Day Forward.

== Career ==
=== This Day Forward (1996–2003) ===
Frangicetto's musical career began in 1997 as the drummer of This Day Forward, consisting of brothers Mike and Gary Shaw on vocals and bass, respectively, Randy Wehrs and Mike Golen on guitars and Colin Frangicetto on drums. Their first full-length album, Fragments of an Untold Story Born By Shunning The Opportunity (1999), released on Break Even Records, gained them significant credit in the local Philadelphia Suburbs. Soon after they signed to Eulogy Recordings and released The Transient Effects of Light on Water (2000) elevating them beyond the local scene. In late 2002, This Day Forward signed with Equal Vision Records and added guitarist Brendan Ekstrom who would go on to join Colin in Circa Survive. After releasing In Response in 2002 and touring with bands such as Thursday and Murder by Death, the band announced their break up in November for reasons unknown to the public. The band played their last show in December while on tour with Alexisonfire at the First Unitarian Church of Philadelphia, a venue they played earlier in their career.

=== Circa Survive (2004–present) ===
After the disbanding of This Day Forward, Frangicetto met up with friend and vocalist Anthony Green, then lead singer of the California rock band Saosin who, on the surface seemed on track to success. Green had decided to take a short amount of time off to return to Philadelphia and "hang out for a little bit" when he met with Colin and they began "jamming and writing every day". With the support of Equal Vision Records, who backed them with enough to get things moving after hearing the rough demos, things began to fall into place. Guitarist Brendan Ekstrom, who had previously worked with Colin in This Day Forward, was the first addition to the band. Colin has expressed a sincere admiration for Ekstrom's work in This Day Forward stating "I had always known that if I were to ever start another band I would need and want him with me." Colin, Anthony and Brendan then found drummer Steve Clifford and bassist Nick Beard of Taken to complete the lineup. The group then went on to rent a house near Philadelphia where they found the inspiration for their first EP The Inuit Sessions and eventually their first full-length album Juturna (2005), released April 29, 2005. Juturna was produced by Brian McTernan and went on to peak at No. 183 on Billboard 200. After the initial success of Juturna, Circa stayed on with Equal Vision Records to release their second full-length album On Letting Go in 2007. The album entered the US billboard at No. 24 on Billboard 200 selling 24,000 copies in the first week. In 2008, Circa Survive returned from their tour with Thrice and Pelican began working on their third full-length album. On April 20, 2010 they released Blue Sky Noise on Atlantic Records and entered the Us Billboard at No. 11.

=== Psychic Babble (solo work) ===
While touring and recording as lead guitarist of Circa Survive, Frangicetto began writing songs that "were initially brought into consideration for inclusion on Circa Survive albums". Colin soon discovered that the material he was creating on his own "needed a different outlet." After five years of writing and recording in "hotel rooms, tour buses, and apartments" Colin found himself with enough material to release a full-length studio album under the name Psychic Babble. The album, titled My Brother's Ears/My Sister's Eyes, was released on August 18 under Yenta Records and features Colin on every instrument including vocals, guitar, drums, and bass. Colin's band mates from Circa Survive have expressed their full support for his solo work in particular front man Anthony Green who has also taken short breaks from Circa to work on solo acts. Although Colin did not tour with material from the album, he has made it clear that hopes to continue to work on Psychic Babble in the future and possibly record a second solo album.

On November 5, 2013, Psychic Babble completed a successful Indiegogo Campaign which raised funds to hire a backing band.

In 2013, Psychic Babble embarked on the "Young Legs Tour" with Anthony Green, Dave Davison (Maps & Atlases), and Brick + Mortar.

=== Film scoring ===
After the release of My Brother's Ears/My Sister's Eyes, Frangicetto began talking to directors most of which were friends of his about scoring a film. Not long after, he was asked to score a short horror-comedy film titled Play Dead. With only a four-week deadline, Colin was able to score the film using "a laptop, keyboard and guitar." The film went on to premiere in minor indie film festivals.

=== Painting ===
Colin began painting on his downtime while touring with Circa Survive as "a great way to stay focused and mellow". This hobby quickly grew into a serious passion and Colin began selling his work in local exhibits and online. His influences range from Esao Andrews, who has created most of the work used for Circa's album covers, to Christopher Davison, Natalia Fabia, Jeremy Geddes and Picasso.

== Discography ==
Solo work

- My Brother's Ears/My Sister's Eyes (2011)

Circa Survive

- The Inuit Sessions (2005)
- Juturna (2005)
- On Letting Go (2007)
- Blue Sky Noise (2010)
- Appendage (2010)
- Violent Waves (2012)
- Descensus (2014)
- The Amulet (2017)
- Two Dreams (2022)

This Day Forward

- Fragments of an Untold Story Born by Shunning the Opportunity 1999
- The Transient Effects of Light on Water (Eulogy Recordings, 2000)
- Kairos EP (Eulogy Recordings, 2002)
- In Response (Equal Vision Records, 2003)
