= Anthony Green (musician) =

American singer (born 1982)

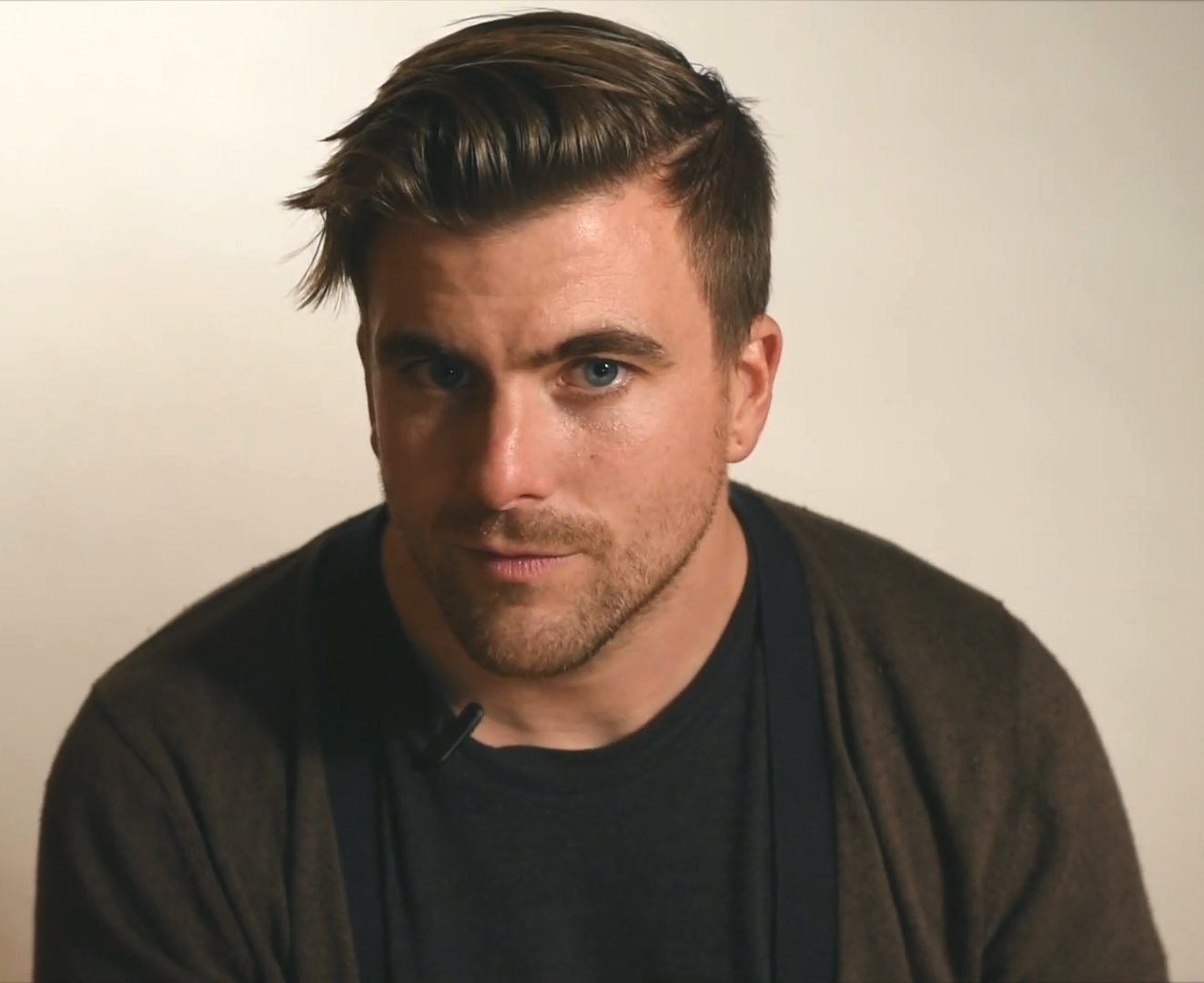
- Green in 2014

Background information
- Also known as: Skunk; Siren; Moshtradamus
- Born: April 15, 1982 (age 44)
- Origin: Doylestown, Pennsylvania, U.S.
- Genres: Post-hardcore; pop rock; experimental rock; emo; progressive rock; screamo; alternative rock; indie rock
- Occupations: Singer; songwriter; magician
- Years active: 1997–present
- Labels: Break Even; Death Do Us Part; Stars & Satellites; Born Losers; Equal Vision; Photo Finish; Epitaph; Atlantic; Sumerian; Hopeless; Rise; Moshtradamus; Memory Music
- Member of: L.S. Dunes; The Sound of Animals Fighting; Circa Survive
- Formerly of: Saosin; Zolof the Rock & Roll Destroyer; Audience of One; Jeer at Rome; High and Driving
- Website: anthonygreenmusic.com

Anthony Green (born April 15, 1982) is an American singer from Doylestown, Pennsylvania. He is currently the lead singer of Circa Survive, the Sound of Animals Fighting, and L.S. Dunes, while also maintaining a solo career. He was previously in the bands Saosin, Audience of One, Jeer at Rome, High and Driving, and Zolof the Rock & Roll Destroyer.

Green is known for his distinctive, high vocal timbre. He has explored lyrical themes including addiction and relapse.

== Career ==
=== Audience of One ===
Anthony Green's first band formed in 1997 while he was in high school with classmate and musician Tommy Dougherty (Junction 232). The band originally had Dougherty on guitar and Green on bass and vocals. Eventually, they recruited drummer Evan Madden. Green wanted to name the band 'Saosin', but Dougherty and Madden decided against it. Before settling on the "Audience of One" name, they played a few shows under the name "Handsome Pete" in 1998 and one show under the name "The Bill Bixby Experience". Due to problems with Evan's availability to practice and play shows, they sought out a new drummer.

Green and Dougherty switched bass and guitar duties. Green met drummer J.D. Foster (Makeshift/Yellow 5) at Days Away's first show in summer of 1998. Foster tried out and musically they clicked right away. The band recorded an LP entitled, I Remember When This All Meant Something at Skylight Studio in the summer of 1999. It was released on Break Even Records on December 3, 1999.

During the summer of 2000, Greg Itzen (Days Away/Like Lions) was welcomed into the band as a second guitar player. As a four-piece, they recorded a four-song demo EP at Skylight Studio. That Autumn, two of the members went off to university and one enlisted in the military. Audience of One was deemed 'on hiatus'.

=== Jeer at Rome ===
From April 12–13, 2000, a four-song demo EP for a hardcore/metal project called "Jeer at Rome" was recorded at Skylight Studio. The band was composed of Anthony Green (vocals), Steve Mensick (guitar), Mike Lepone (guitar), Chris Mensick (bass) and Luke Carmen (drums) The self-titled demo was released on compact disc. They played a handful of shows during the spring and summer of 2000, but apparently dissolved soon afterward.

=== Zolof The Rock and Roll Destroyer ===
Anthony sang on seven songs on Zolof The Rock & Roll Destroyer's self-titled first album. The recordings took place mostly in 2000 and 2001 and were released in early 2002. At that time, the band consisted of Rachel Minton (vocals and keyboards), Anthony Green (vocals and backup vocals), Vince Ratti (guitar and keyboards), Bob Bonocore (vocals and bass) and Rick Delello (drums). Green and Zolof parted ways in early 2002 due to Green's need to "work some things out" in his personal life. They still remain good friends. One year later, Ratti and Minton helped Anthony record vocals over the Saosin instrumental demo recordings, then known as 'The Gift'. Two years later, Green contributed vocals to the Zolof The Rock & Roll Destroyer song "This Was All A Bad Idea" off of their album The Popsicle EP [2004]. In 2012, Ratti mixed Circa Survive's fourth album, "Violent Waves". Minton also contributed backup vocals to the song 'Suitcase'.

=== High and Driving ===
Green recorded a four-song EP in 2002 at Ratti's Skylight Studio in Fairless Hills, PA. Green recorded most of the instruments himself except for drums and some keyboard parts. Tim Arnold (Days Away/Good Old War) supplied the drums and Ratti and Minton tracked some of the keyboard parts. The recording was shared on the internet since early 2004 and ended up being officially released on the deluxe version of Avalon on August 5, 2008, on Photo Finish Records.

=== Saosin ===
The original lineup of Saosin consisted of Anthony Green (vocals), Beau Burchell (guitar), Justin Shekoski (guitar), Zach Kennedy (bass) and Pat Magrath (drums). Their first album, an EP, consisting of 5 songs, was recorded in February and March 2003. Magrath was a studio musician hired to play drums on the album. The drum parts were written largely by Burchell with Alex Rodriguez in mind. Rodriguez was to assume the role of drummer, but he had obligations playing drums for the band Open Hand at the time. Chris Warner filled in on drums during early rehearsals. Kennedy quit the band for personal reasons. Chris Sorenson took the spot as bassist. Before they began playing shows, Danny King replaced Warner as drummer. After only a handful of shows, Rodriguez finally took over as Saosin's permanent drummer.

The band released the EP Translating the Name on June 17, 2003. It was an immediate underground success and was immensely popular on online forums and music sites. Preorders of the album came with a bonus CD containing two acoustic versions of songs from the EP. Translating The Name (2003) has sold an estimated 62,000 copies as of 2008. Green quit Saosin in mid-February 2004, and he was later replaced by Cove Reber.

Following Cove Reber's departure, the band announced on February 20, 2014, that Anthony Green would be reuniting with his former band Saosin for the Skate and Surf festival on May 17, 2014. More shows were quickly booked for May, June and September totaling eight reunion shows during 2014. Anthony Green has hinted at the possibility of recording new material with Saosin after most of the tour cycle for Circa Survive's fifth album, Descensus had completed. Saosin announced that they would be playing some shows in California and Texas in January 2015. The band released a new single "Silver String" on March 16, 2016, while on tour.

Shortly after the release of "Silver String", it was announced that Green decided to ultimately stay with Saosin, while still maintaining his role as lead vocals for Circa Survive and as a solo artist. The band released their first LP since 2009, "Along the Shadow" in May 2016 through Epitaph Records. It peaked at #45 on the Billboard 100 chart.

=== The Sound of Animals Fighting ===
Green is part of another side project with members of Finch, Rx Bandits, Days Away and Chiodos under the alias of The Skunk (each member of The Sound of Animals Fighting was equipped with an animal mask to hide their personas and give the band creative inspiration). Three studio albums were recorded between 2004 and 2008, Tiger and the Duke (2004), Lover, the Lord Has Left Us... (2006) and The Ocean and the Sun (2008). They played four shows in August 2006 of which one was recorded for a live DVD entitled, We Must Become the Change We Want to See (2007). In March 2014, they reunited for a seven show tour, and in Feb/March 2019 for an eight show tour, playing songs from all three albums. In December 2022, they released an EP titled Apeshit. In early 2023, Green and the band went on another eighteen show tour, and released a live album/VHS titled, Live in Philadelphia, later in the year.

=== Circa Survive ===
Immediately after quitting Saosin, Green and Colin Frangicetto (This Day Forward) founded Philadelphia-based Circa Survive, which signed with Equal Vision Records. This new project changed his musical vision from post-hardcore to a more experimental rock sound. Very early on Brendan Ekstrom (This Day Forward) was recruited on guitar. By the end of summer 2004, the lineup was solidified with Nick Beard (Taken) on bass and Stephen Clifford (Reflux) on drums.

Within a year, they had released a limited edition tour EP, The Inuit Sessions, and a full-length album, Juturna. They released their second album, On Letting Go, in May 2007. They parted ways with Equal Vision in August 2008. Their third album, Blue Sky Noise, was released in April 2010 on Atlantic Records. In November 2010, they released an EP called Appendage also on Atlantic Records. Their self-produced fourth album, Violent Waves, was released on August 28, 2012. Their fifth album, Descensus was released on November 24, 2014, on Sumerian Records. Their sixth album, The Amulet, was released on September 22, 2017. Their seventh & eighth release were two thematically linked EPs, 'A Dream About Love' (October 12, 2021) and 'A Dream About Death' (February 4, 2022), both released on Rise Records. The two EPs were later combined into one album, Two Dreams, released on December 16, 2022.

=== L.S. Dunes ===
On August 26, 2022, L.S. Dunes' debut album, Past Lives (2022), was announced accompanied by the release of their first single, "Permanent Rebellion". The new band features Anthony Green, My Chemical Romance's Frank Iero, Coheed and Cambria's Travis Stever and Thursday's Tim Payne and Tucker Rule. Their second album, Violet, was released January 31, 2025.

== Solo projects ==
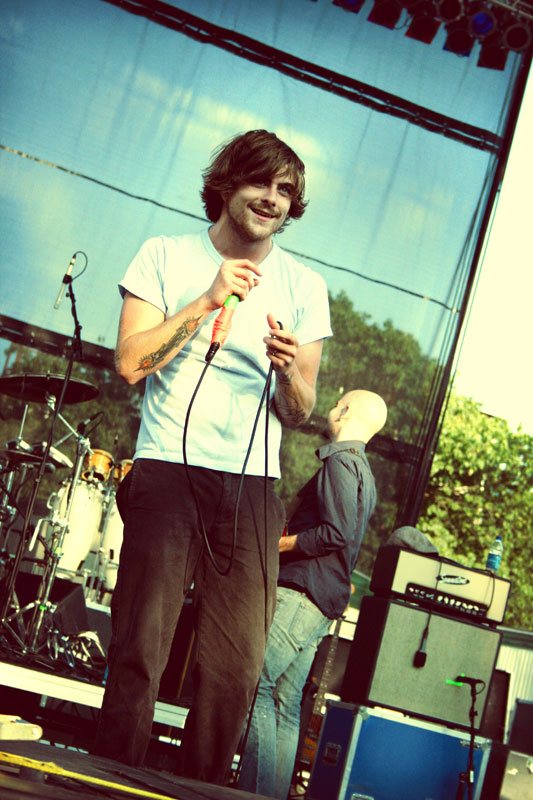
Green in 2008

=== Avalon (2008) ===
Green announced his plans to record his first solo album in December 2007. Avalon was recorded at The Big House in Avalon, New Jersey between late February and early March 2008. Keith Goodwin, Dan Schwartz and Tim Arnold of the band Good Old War played various instruments on the album. Two music videos were shot before the album was released. "Dear Child (I've Been Dying To Reach You)" was shot on May 31, 2008, and released on July 23, 2008. "She Loves Me So" was shot in late July 2008 and released on December 15, 2008. Avalon was released on August 5, 2008, peaking at #44 on the Billboard 200 in the United States. Anthony named the album after being inspired by his father. "my dad said you should call it avalon-"

=== Jackie Haenn (2008) ===
On November 12, 2008, Green released a two-song EP entitled, Jackie Haenn to help fund his cousin-in-law's medical transport fees after she was injured in a car accident on Halloween Night. The songs are B-sides recorded during the Avalon recording session.

=== Avalon [Remixes] (2008) ===
While Green was on the Avalon tour with three-fifths of Circa Survive, Colin Frangicetto worked on his remixes of Avalon in Doylestown, Pennsylvania. He used instrumentation and vocals from the original Avalon recording session but also recorded many new instruments and parts himself. He kept most of the song structures intact but the additional tracking makes it more of a 'reimagining' than a strict 'remix'. The remix album was released digitally on December 5, 2008. It was released as part of a preorder bundle for Avalon's first vinyl pressing. The physical compact disc of the remix album wasn't available until around January 20, 2009, when the vinyl bundles shipped.

=== Beautiful Things (2012) ===
Green announced the title of his second solo album as Beautiful Things in September 2009 while he and the rest of Circa Survive were in Toronto, Canada recording Blue Sky Noise. The album was mainly recorded in early January 2011 at The Big House in Avalon, New Jersey by producer Jason Cupp. Once again the members of Good Old War served as his backup band and helped shape the feel of the songs much more than for Avalon. The album title comes from the lyrics of a Good Old War song entitled "Lullaby" that Green adopted as his own. Anthony's version of "Lullaby" became the closing track of the album. The album was mixed at least seven times over the course of 2011. Green announced the release date on November 15, 2011. Beautiful Things was released on January 17, 2012, peaking at #27 on the Billboard 200 charts in the United States. A music video for the song "Get Yours While You Can" was shot in late November 2011 and released on January 31, 2012. This album also included many of his friends and idols such as Dave Davison of Maps and Atlases, Nate Ruess of Fun, Chino Moreno of Deftones, and Ida Maria to add some variety to his music. Anthony Green describes "Beautiful Things as, "The whole album is sort of about people and the victories you have with them. When I decided on the title, I wasn't thinking of a concrete thing."

=== Young Legs (2013) ===
In the spring of 2011, before his second solo album was even complete, Green mentioned his desire to record and release a third solo album entitled 'Young Legs'. From May to June 2013, Green recorded 'Young Legs' at Studio 4 in Conshohocken, Pennsylvania. Will Yip acted as producer, engineer, composer and performer. The band Good Old War once again joined him as his backing band, as well as, having a hand in the song's composition. On September 17, 2013, Green revealed the album's cover art, track list, release date, fall tour dates and released the first single entitled "Breaker". On October 22, 2013, the second single which is also the title track, "Young Legs" was released. The album was released on November 12, 2013, peaking at #67 on the Billboard 200 charts in the United States. 'Young Legs' contains eleven songs and the deluxe version of the album contains five demos. A music video for the song "Young Legs" was shot during the Beautiful Things tour in 2012 and was released on November 26, 2013.

=== Pixie Queen (2016) ===
In mid-late 2015, Green announced that a fourth solo album was in the works and should be ready sometime in 2016.

It was announced that the album would be released on September 9, 2016, and would be titled "Pixie Queen". A music video for the opening track, You'll Be Fine, was released through his label, Memory Music. It was also announced that he has partnered with producer Will Yip, who he has worked with before.

He also announced a Pixie Queen tour, which would begin on September 2, 2016, and end on October 1, 2016. As expected, Pixie Queen was released on September 9 through Memory Music.

=== Would You Still Be In Love (2018) ===
On June 1, 2018, Green released the album Would You Still Be In Love, on the Memory Music label.

=== Boom. Done. (2022 – Present) ===
On July 22, 2022, Anthony Green released the album Boom. Done. under license to Born Losers Records. After initially being released as a 10-track album that included the song "2022", the track was removed from all streaming services, and the album is now listed as a 9-track album. "2022" was later re-recorded for L.S. Dunes' debut album Past Lives.

== Personal life ==
Green has previously battled with alcohol and heroin addiction, quitting for some time but relapsing in 2019. On November 10, 2019, he posted on Twitter that he is "trying to take time to pull myself back together" and it is "the hardest thing I and my family have ever experienced. I look forward to getting healthy and hopefully being able to share in making music with and for you again. See you in the spring."

In 2021, Green said, "I'm bi, I don't really consider myself anything, but I'm attracted to all sexes."

He also has bipolar disorder, which had been previously misdiagnosed as schizophrenia.

== Discography ==
As Anthony Green

- Avalon (2008)
- Jackie Haenn (EP) (2008)
- Avalon Remix (2009)
- Beautiful December (EP) (2011)
- Beautiful Things (2012)
- Beautiful Spring (EP) (2012)
- Hurricane Sandy Benefit EP (2012)
- Off the Board: A Studio 4 Family Compilation (2013)
- Young Legs (2013)
- Prevention Songs EP (2014)
- Winter Songs EP (2014)
- Pixie Queen (2016)
- Would You Still Be In Love (2018)
- Studio 4 Acoustic Session (2018)
- Would You Still Be A Remix, Volume 1 (2018)
- Would You Still Be With Strings (2019)
- Would You Still Be Live (2020)
- Covers EP (2020)
- Live at Studio 4 (2021)
- Let's Start a Band EP (2021)
- Boom. Done. (2022)
- Doom. Spun. Volume One (2024)
- So Long, Avalon. (2025)
- Reconcile At The Tile Works, Recorded Live (2026)

With Audience of One

- I Remember When This All Meant Something (1999)
- Untitled (Demo) (EP) (2000)

With Jeer at Rome

- Jeer at Rome (Demo) (EP) (2000)

With Zolof the Rock and Roll Destroyer

- Zolof the Rock and Roll Destroyer (2004)
- The Popsicle EP (2004)

With High and Driving

- High and Driving EP (2002)

With Saosin

- Translating the Name (2003)
- A Santa Cause: It's a Punk Rock Christmas (2003)
  - "Mookie's Last Christmas"
- Saosin (Demo) (2003)
  - "I Can Tell There's Been An Accident Here" (Demo)
- Chris Sorenson & Anthony Green (Demo) (2003/2004)
  - "I've Become What I've Always Hated" (Demo)
- Along the Shadow (2016)

With The Sound of Animals Fighting

- Tiger and the Duke (2005)
- Lover, the Lord Has Left Us... (2006)
- We Must Become the Change We Want to See (2007) [Live DVD/CD]
- The Ocean and the Sun (2008)
- Apeshit (2022)
- Live in Philadelphia (2023)
- The Maiden (2025)

With Fuckin' Whatever

- Fuckin Whatever (2021)
- Houdini (2022)

With And There with Them Was Love

- The Ballad (2020)
- Gloryiia (2020)
- Dutch Winter (2020)

With Jess Margera

- Did You See Me? (2022)
- Woo Woo (Song #2) (2022)

With Circa Survive

- The Inuit Sessions (2005)
- Juturna (2005)
- On Letting Go (2007)
- B-Sides (EP) (2008)
- Blue Sky Noise (2010)
- Appendage (2010)
- Violent Waves (2012)
- Hurricane Sandy Benefit (EP) (2012)
- Christmas Songs (Anthony Green album)|Christmas Songs (2012)
- Off The Board: A Studio 4 Family Compilation (2013)
- Descensus (2014)
- The Amulet (2017)
- A Dream About Love (2021)
- A Dream About Death EP (2022)
- Two Dreams (2022)

With L.S. Dunes

- Past Lives (2022)
- Benadryl Subreddit EP (2023)
- How Dare You (2024)
- Violet (2025)

List of guest appearances

- A Life Once Lost
  - A Life Once Lost [Demo] (1999)
    - A Falls River Farewell (Demo)
  - Iron Gag (2007)
    - All Teeth (backup vocals)
- A Trunk Full of Dead Bodies
  - My Smile, Her Corpse (2003)
    - Green On '73 (backup)
    - Bi-Polar Opposites
    - Finger in Your Throat (backup)
    - Spare Me The Couch (backup)
    - Ride or Die (opening chorus)
- Like Lions
  - Like Lions [Demo] (2004)
    - Sweetside (backup vocals)
    - Cheap Seats (backup vocals)
- The Receiving End of Sirens
  - Between the Heart and the Synapse (2004)
    - Flee the Factory (backup vocals)
    - Epilogue (backup vocals)
- Fear Before the March of Flames
  - The Always Open Mouth (2006)
    - My (Fucking) Deer Hunter (backup vocals)
- The Spill Canvas
  - No Really, I'm Fine (2007)
    - Bleed, Everyone's Doing It (backup vocals)
- Envy on the Coast
  - Lucy Gray (2007)
    - The Gift of Paralysis (backup vocals)
- Say Anything
  - In Defense of the Genre (2007)
    - Hangover Song (backup vocals)
- Good Old War
  - Only Way to Be Alone (2008)
    - Weak Man
  - Part of You EP (2018)
    - That Feeling
- Colin Frangicetto
  - Colin Frangicetto [Demo] (2009)
    - Hidden Cameras
- Mindy White
  - Holiday Release (2009)
    - Baby, It's Cold Outside
- Psychic Babble
  - My Brother's Ears/My Sister's Eyes (2011)
    - Five Fold Kiss (Don't Sleep)
    - Nothing Familiar
- Lolly & YoYo
  - An Adventurous Day (2013)
    - I Don't Want to Go to Sleep
  - Nice Things (2017)
    - See You Smile Again
    - Top of the Hill
- Balance and Composure
  - The Things We Think We're Missing (2013)
    - Keepsake
- Sam Means
  - Blue Jeans 7" (2014)
    - Blue Jeans (Lana Del Rey Cover)
- Mat Kerekes
  - Luna & the Wild Blue Everything (2016)
    - Direction
- Eisley
  - I'm Only Dreaming (2017)
    - Louder Than a Lion
- Grey
  - Chameleon (2017)
    - Wings Clipped (With Avril Lavigne)
- Concrete Castles
  - Wish I Missed U (2021)
    - Wish I Missed U
- Clockwise On Fire
  - Clockwise On Fire (2021)
    - What Will You Forget
- Caracara
  - New Preoccupations (2022)
    - Colorglut
- Skrillex
  - Don't Get Too Close (2023)
    - 3am
- The HIRS Collective
  - We're Still Here (2023)
    - A Different Kind of Bed Death
- Night Verses
  - Every Sound Has a Color in the Valley of Night (2024)
    - Slow Dose
