= Will Yip =

American producer, songwriter, and musician (born 1987)

- Born: 葉浩仁; February 18, 1987 (age 39); New York City, New York, U.S.
- Genres: Alternative rock; indie rock; hardcore punk; hip-hop; shoegaze
- Occupations: Record producer; record executive
- Years active: 2006–present
- Label: Memory Music

Will Yip (Chinese: 葉浩仁; born February 18, 1987) is a Grammy-winning American record producer, audio engineer, songwriter and musician. Yip is an owner of Studio 4 Recording in Conshohocken, Pennsylvania. Yip is also the owner of Memory Music, an independent record label that he launched in June 2015, that features projects worked on at Studio 4.

Yip's partial discography includes producing, engineering, mixing, and mastering recordings for artists such as Lauryn Hill, Panic! at the Disco, Circa Survive, Code Orange, Anthony Green, Blacklisted, Title Fight, Turnstile, The Wonder Years, The Disco Biscuits, King Sunny Adé, The Fray, Keane, Balance and Composure, Superheaven, mewithoutYou, and Movements.

Yip is also a studio and live drummer. He was the drummer and music director for hip hop emcee Schoolly D and his band International Supersport.

== Early life ==
Yip was born in Brooklyn, New York and he later attended Central High School in Philadelphia, Pennsylvania.

== Career ==
On October 8, 2013, Yip released a compilation album titled Off The Board: A Studio 4 Family Compilation. The compilation included unreleased songs from bands such as Title Fight, Tigers Jaw, Circa Survive, Pity Sex, Anthony Green and much more.

In early 2017, Yip, alongside Atlantic Records, launched the imprint Black Cement Records, with the first release being Tigers Jaw's Spin.

== Discography ==
| Year | Artist | Album | Label | Credit |
|---|---|---|---|---|
| 2015 | Adventures | Supersonic Home | Run For Cover Records | Producer, Recording Engineer, Mix, Master |
| 2009 | Aneurysm Rats | Dying to Live | Assassinated Records | Producer, Recording Engineer, Mix, Master |
| 2016 | Angel Du$t | Rock The Fuck On Forever | Pop Wig Records | Producer, Recording Engineer, Mix, Master, Writer |
| 2019 | Angel Du$t | Pretty Buff | Roadrunner Records | Producer, Recording Engineer, Mix, Composer, Keyboards |
| 2013 | Anthony Green | Young Legs | Moshtradamus Records | Producer, Recording Engineer, Mix |
| 2016 | Anthony Green | Pixie Queen | Memory Music/Moshtradamus Records | Producer, Recording Engineer, Mix, Writer |
| 2017 | Anthony Green | Studio 4 Acoustic Session | Memory Music/Moshtradamus Records | Producer, Recording Engineer, Mix, Master Writer |
| 2018 | Anthony Green | Will You Still Be In Love | Memory Music/Moshtradamus Records | Producer, Recording Engineer, Mix, Master |
| 2021 | Anthony Green | Live at Studio 4 | Memory Music | Producer, Recording Engineer, Mix, Master |
| 2022 | Anthony Green | Boom. Done. | Born Losers Records | Mix, Master |
| 2006 | Arctic Monkeys | Live Recording | Warner | Recording Engineer |
| 2011 | Balance and Composure | Separation (Aus.Bonus) | No Sleep Records | Recording Engineer, Mix |
| 2013 | Balance and Composure | Split w/Braid | No Sleep Records | Producer, Recording Engineer, Mix |
| 2013 | Balance and Composure | The Things We Think We're Missing | No Sleep Records | Producer, Recording Engineer |
| 2016 | Balance and Composure | Light We Made | Vagrant/Big Scary Monsters | Producer, Recording Engineer, Mix |
| 2023 | Balance and Composure | Too Quick to Forgive 7" single | Memory Music | Producer, Recording Engineer, Composer, Mix, Master |
| 2024 | Balance and Composure | With You in Spirit | Memory Music | Producer, Composer |
| 2020 | Bartees Strange | Live Forever | Memory Music | Mastering |
| 2021 | Bartees Strange | Live Forever Deluxe Edition | Memory Music | Producer, Mix, Mastering, Drums |
| 2021 | Bartees Strange | Live at Studio 4 | Memory Music | Producer, Recording Engineer, Mix, Master |
| 2012 | Beanie Sigel | This Time | Ruffhouse Records | Recording Engineer |
| 2009 | Blacklisted | No One Deserves to Be Here More than Me | Deathwish Inc. | Recording Engineer, Mix, Master |
| 2009 | Blacklisted | Eccentrichine EP | Six Feet Under Records | Recording Engineer, Mix, Master |
| 2012 | Blacklisted | So, You Are A Magician? EP | Six Feet Under Records | Recording Engineer, Mix, Master |
| 2015 | Blacklisted | When People Grow, People Go | Deathwish Inc. | Recording Engineer, Mix |
| 2019 | The Bouncing Souls | Crucial Moments EP | Rise Records | Producer, Recording Engineer, Mix, Composer |
| 2020 | The Bouncing Souls | Volume 2 | Pure Noise Records | Producer, Recording Engineer, Mix, Master, Composer |
| 2023 | The Bouncing Souls | Ten Stories High | Pure Noise Records | Producer, Recording Engineer, Mix, Master, Composer |
| 2013 | Braid | Split w/Balance and Composure | No Sleep Records | Mix |
| 2014 | Braid | No Coast | Topshelf Records | Producer, Recording Engineer, Mix |
| 2019 | Caracara | Better EP | Memory Music | Producer, Recording Engineer, Mix, Master |
| 2019 | Caracara | Dark Bells Single | Memory Music | Producer, Recording Engineer, Mix, Master |
| 2022 | Caracara | New Preoccupations | Memory Music | Producer, Recording Engineer, Mix, Master |
| 2024 | Carly Cosgrove | The Cleanest of Houses Are Empty | Wax Bodega | Master |
| 2020 | Caspian | On Circles | Triple Crown | Producer, Recording Engineer, Mix, Percussion |
| 2019 | Ceremony | In The Spirit World Now | Relapse Records | Producer, Recording Engineer, Percussion |
| 2010 | Circa Survive | Blue Sky Noise | Atlantic Records | Re-Mix Engineer |
| 2012 | Circa Survive | Violent Waves | self-release | Recording Engineer, Co-Producer |
| 2014 | Circa Survive | Live From The Shrine | Sumerian | Recording Engineer, Mixer |
| 2014 | Circa Survive | Descensus | Sumerian | Producer, Recording Engineer, Mixer, Writer |
| 2017 | Circa Survive | The Amulet | Hopeless Records | Producer, Recording Engineer, Mixer, Writer |
| 2021 | Circa Survive | A Dream About Love EP | Rise Records | Producer, Recording Engineer, Mix, Composer |
| 2022 | Circa Survive | A Dream About Death EP | Rise Records | Producer, Recording Engineer, Mix, Composer |
| 2012 | Citizen | Split | Run For Cover Records | Producer, Recording Engineer, Mix |
| 2013 | Citizen | Youth | Run For Cover Records | Producer, Recording Engineer, Mix, Master |
| 2015 | Citizen | Everybody Is Going to Heaven | Run For Cover Records | Producer, Recording Engineer, Mix |
| 2017 | Citizen | As You Please | Run For Cover Records | Producer, Recording Engineer |
| 2017 | Code Orange | Forever | Roadrunner Records | Producer, Recording Engineer, Mix |
| 2018 | Code Orange | Only One Way | Roadrunner Records | Producer, Recording Engineer, Mix |
| 2018 | Code Orange | Hurt Goes On EP | Roadrunner Records | Producer, Recording Engineer, Mix |
| 2019 | Code Orange | Let Me In (Theme song for Bray Wyatt) | WWE | Producer, Recording Engineer, Mix, Drums |
| 2020 | Code Orange | Underneath | Roadrunner Records | Co-Producer, Recording Engineer, Mix |
| 2014 | Cold World | How The Gods Chill | Deathwish Inc. | Producer, Recording Engineer, Mix |
| 2011 | Cold World/War Hungry | Split | Six Feet Under Records | Master |
| 2014 | Columbus | Home Remedy EP | Self-Released | Mix, Master |
| 2012 | Cop Problem | Self-titled EP | War Torn Records / Prejudice Me Records | Recording Engineer, Mix, Master |
| 2007 | Cradle of Filth | Live Recording | Roadrunner Records | Recording Engineer |
| 2009 | CKY | Carver City | Roadrunner Records | Mix |
| 2011 | David Bromberg | Use Me | Columbia Records | Recording Engineer |
| 2012 | Daylight | The Difference Between Good and Bad Dreams | Run For Cover Records | Recording Engineer |
| 2011 | Dead End Path | Blind Faith | Triple B Records | Producer, Recording Engineer, Mix, Master |
| 2014 | Dead End Path | Seance & Other Songs | Triple B Records | Producer, Recording Engineer, Mix, Master |
| 2019 | Dear Seattle | Don't Let Go | Domestic La La | Mix |
| 2019 | Defeater | Defeater | Epitaph Records | Producer, Recording Engineer, Mix |
| 2015 | Die Choking | III | The Compound & Selfmadegod Records | Recording Engineer, Mix, Master |
| 2025 | Die Spitz | Something to Consume | Third Man Records | Producer |
| 2011 | Disco Biscuits | Otherwise Law Abiding Citizens | Independent Label Group | Recording Engineer |
| 2011 | Disengage | Expressions | Triple B Records/Back to Back Records | Producer, Recording Engineer, Mix, Master |
| 2021 | Dreamtigers | Six Rivers | Skeletal Lightning | Mix, Master |
| 2023 | Duckboy | tragic love songs to study to (vol. 5) | G59 Records | Producer, Recording Engineer, Mix, Master |
| 2023 | Duckboy | existential hymns for the average sigma (vol. 9) | G59 Records | Producer, Recording Engineer, Mix, Master |
| 2017 | Eisley | I'm Only Dreaming | Equal Vision Records | Producer, Recording Engineer, Mix, Instrumentalist, Composer |
| 2019 | Esta Coda | King Bitter | Memory Music | Producer, Recording Engineer, Mix |
| 2012 | Face Reality | Strong Survive | Back to Back Records | Producer, Recording Engineer, Mix, Master |
| 2022 | Fantasy Camp | Casual Intimacy | Memory Music | Mix, Master |
| 2012 | Far From Proper | Rock Bottom | Self Released | Producer, Recording Engineer, Mix, Master |
| 2023 | Flycatcher | Stunt EP | Memory Music | Master |
| 2024 | Flycatcher | Brother - Single | Memory Music | Producer, Recording Engineer, Composer, Mix, Master, Percussion |
| 2018 | Former Member | Old Youth | Memory Music | Drums, Co-Producer, Recording Engineer, Mix |
| 2021 | Former Member | Manageable Scratches | Memory Music | Producer, Recording Engineer, Mix, Drums, Composer |
| 2007 | The Fray | Live From the Electric Factory | Sony/BMG | Recording Engineer |
| 2020 | Free the Birds | Free the Birds EP | | Recording Engineer, Co-Production, Mix, Master |
| 2021 | Free Throw | Piecing It Together | Triple Crown Records | Producer, Recording Engineer, Mix, Composer |
| 2024 | From Indian Lakes | Head Void | little shuteye | Master |
| 2016 | Ghost Tours | Warm Lights | | Mix, Master |
| 2024 | Glass Beach | Plastic Death | Run For Cover Records | Mastering Engineer |
| 2020 | Gleemer | Down Through | Other People Records | Producer, Recording Engineer, Mix, Percussion |
| 2022 | Glitterer | Fantasy Four EP | Anti | Producer, Recording Engineer, Mix |
| 2013 | Grayscale | Leaving | | Producer, Recording Engineer |
| 2022 | Gregor Barnett | Don't Go Throwing Roses In My Grave | Epitaph | Producer, Recording Engineer, Mix, Master, Drums |
| 2012 | Gypsy | Giant's Despair LP | Six Feet Under Records | Producer, Recording Engineer, Mix, Master |
| 2010 | Giving Chase | Iron Lungs in Iron Men | Jumpstart Records | Recording Engineer, Mix |
| 2023 | Harm's Way | Common Suffering | Metal Blade Records | Producer, Recording Engineer |
| 2019 | Haze | Collection 2011-2014 | Independent | Producer, Recording Engineer, Mix, Master |
| 2022 | Heart to Gold | Tom | Memory Music | Producer, Recording Engineer, Mix, Master |
| 2024 | Heart to Gold | Free Help | Memory Music | Producer, Recording Engineer, Composer, Mix, Master, Percussion, Keyboard |
| 2008 | The Hooters | Both Sides Live | Sony | Recording Engineer |
| 2014 | Hostage Calm | Die On Stage | Run For Cover Records | Producer, Recording Engineer, Mix, Master |
| 2014 | I Am the Avalanche | Wolverines | I Surrender Records | Mix |
| 2022 | JR Slayer | Not RottenEP | Memory Music | Producer, Recording Engineer, Mix, Master, Composer |
| 2022 | Kayleigh Goldsworthy | Learning to be Happy | Memory Music | Producer, Recording Engineer, Mix, Master, Drums, Bass, Programming |
| 2021 | Kayleigh Goldsworthy | Overambitious / Keep The Light On (2 Song Single) | Memory Music | Producer, Recording Engineer, Mix |
| 2007 | Keane | Under Pressure Single | Interscope Records | Recording Engineer |
| 2010 | King Sunny Adé | Baba Mo Tunde | Indigedisc Records | Recording Engineer |
| 2013 | Koji | Crooked In My Mind | Run For Cover Records | Producer, Recording Engineer, Mix |
| 2014 | La Dispute | Rooms of the House | Better Living | Producer, Recording Engineer, Mix |
| 2019 | La Dispute | Panorama | Epitaph Records | Producer, Recording Engineer, Mix |
| 2019 | La Dispute | Somewhere at the Bottom of the River 10th Anniversary | No Sleep | Recording Engineer |
| 2013 | Light Years | I Won't Hold This Against You | Paper And Plastik | Producer, Recording Engineer, Mix |
| 2014 | Light Years | Temporary | Animal Style Records | Producer, Recording Engineer, Mix, Master |
| 2015 | Light Years | I'll See You When I See You | Rude Records | Producer, Recording Engineer, Mix, Master, Percussion, Composer |
| 2009 | Lighten Up | Absolutely Not | Jumpstart Records | Recording Engineer, Mix |
| 2014 | Lower Lifes | Karma | Hell City Records | Master |
| 2022 | L.S. Dunes | Past Lives | Fantasy Records | Producer, Recording Engineer, Mix, Composer |
| 2025 | L.S. Dunes | Violet | Fantasy Records | Producer, Recording Engineer, Mix, Composer |
| 2019 | Mannequin Pussy | Patience | Epitaph | Producer, Recording Engineer, Mix, Master |
| 2021 | Mannequin Pussy | Perfect EP | Epitaph | Producer, Recording Engineer, Mix, Master, Composer |
| 2014 | Major League | There's Nothing Wrong With Me | No Sleep Records | Producer, Recording Engineer, Mix |
| 2013 | Man Overboard | Heart Attack | Rise Records | Producer, Recording Engineer, Mix |
| 2016 | Mat Kerekes | Luna and the Wild Blue Everything | Equal Vision Records | Producer, Recording Engineer, Mix, Master, Writer |
| 2017 | The Menzingers | After The Party | Epitaph | Producer, Recording Engineer, Mix |
| 2018 | The Menzingers | Toy Soldiers/Freaks Singles | Epitaph | Producer, Recording Engineer, Mix |
| 2019 | The Menzingers | Hello Exile | Epitaph | Producer, Recording Engineer, Mix |
| 2020 | The Menzingers | From Exile | Epitaph | Mix, Master |
| 2015 | mewithoutYou | Pale Horses | Run For Cover Records | Producer, Recording Engineer, Mix |
| 2018 | mewithoutYou | Untitled EP | Run For Cover Records | Producer, Recording Engineer, Mix |
| 2018 | mewithoutYou | Untitled LP | Run For Cover Records | Producer, Recording Engineer, Mix |
| 2016 | Movements | Outgrown Things | Fearless Records | Producer, Recording Engineer, Mix, Writer |
| 2017 | Movements | Feel Something | Fearless Records | Producer, Recording Engineer, Mix, Background Vocals, Writer |
| 2020 | Movements | No Good Left To Give | Fearless Records | Producer, Recording Engineer, Mix, Writer |
| 2021 | Movements | B-Sides | Fearless Records | Producer, Recording Engineer, Mix, Writer |
| 2021 | Movements | Live at Studio 4 | Memory Music | Producer, Recording Engineer, Mix |
| 2023 | Movements | RUCKUS! | Fearless | Producer, Recording Engineer, Composer, Mix |
| 2024 | Movements | RUCKUS! (The Remixes) | Fearless | Producer, Recording Engineer, Composer, Mix |
| 2024 | Movements | Afraid to Die - Single | Fearless | Producer, Recording Engineer, Composer, Mix, Percussion, Keyboard |
| 2025 | Movements | Where I Lay - Single | Fearless | Producer, Recording Engineer, Composer, Mix, Percussion, Keyboard |
| 2013 | The Mongoloids | Mongo Life | Six Feet Under Records | Producer, Recording Engineer, Mix |
| 2011 | Mother of Mercy | IV: Symptoms of Existence | Bridge 9 Records | Producer, Recording Engineer, Mix |
| 2013 | Ms. Lauryn Hill | TBA | Ruffhouse Records | Recording Engineer, Mix |
| 2011 | Naysayer | Laid to Rest | Reaper Records | Producer, Recording Engineer, Mix, Master |
| 2010 | None More Black | Icons | Fat Wreck Chords | Producer, Recording Engineer, Mix |
| 2016 | Nothing | Tired of Tomorrow | Relapse Records | Producer, Recording Engineer, Mix |
| 2020 | Nothing | The Great Dismal | Relapse Records | Producer, Recording Engineer, Mix, Master |
| 2021 | Nothing | The Great Dismal B-Sides | Relapse Records | Producer, Recording Engineer, Mix, Master |
| 2024 | Oceanator | Everything is Love and Death | Polyvinyl Record Co. | Producer, Recording Engineer, Composer, Mix, Master, Percussion, Drums |
| 2024 | Origami Angel | Feeling Not Found | Counter Intuitive Records | Producer, Recording Engineer, Composer, Mix, Master, Percussion, Keyboard |
| 2021 | Orson Wilds | Kyoto | Black Cement Records | Mix, Master |
| 2021 | Orson Wilds | What Is It That You Won't Let Go EP | Black Cement Records | Producer, Recording Engineer, Mix, Composer, Instrumentalist |
| 2016 | Panic! at the Disco | Death Of A Bachelor/This Is Gospel 7" | Fueled By Ramen Records | Producer, Recording Engineer, Mix |
| 2013 | Paint It Black | Invisible | No Idea Records | Producer, Recording Engineer, Mix |
| 2021 | Paerish | Fixed It All | Side One Dummy | Producer, Recording Engineer, Mix, Composer |
| 2016 | Paerish | Semi Finalists | 14 Bowls of Cereal | Master |
| 2023 | Paerish | You're in both dreams (and you're scared) | SideOneDummy | Producer, Recording Engineer, Mix, Master |
| 2015 | Petal | Shame | Run For Cover Records | Producer, Recording Engineer, Mix, Master |
| 2018 | Petal | Magic Gone | Run For Cover Records | Producer, Recording Engineer, Mix, Master |
| 2014 | Pianos Become The Teeth | Keep You | Epitaph | Producer, Recording Engineer, Mix |
| 2018 | Pianos Become The Teeth | Wait For Love | Epitaph | Producer, Recording Engineer, Mix, Composer |
| 2014 | Pillow Talk | Recreational Feelings | Either/Or Records | Master |
| 2022 | Pinkshift | Love Me Forever | Hopeless | Producer, Recording Engineer, Mix |
| 2023 | Pinkshift | Suraksha | Hopeless | Producer, Recording Engineer, Mix |
| 2013 | Pity Sex | Feast of Love | Run For Cover Records | Producer, Recording Engineer, Mix, Master, Percussion |
| 2016 | Pity Sex | White Hot Moon | Run For Cover Records | Producer, Recording Engineer, Percussion, Mix, Percussion |
| 2019 | Pine | Pine | No Sleep | Mix |
| 2013 | Polar Bear Club | Death Chorus | Rise Records | Producer, Recording Engineer, Mix |
| 2014 | Puddle Splasher | Poor Planning | Black Numbers | Master |
| 2019 | Queen of Jeans | If You're Not Afraid, I'm Not Afraid | Topshelf Records | Producer, Recording Engineer, Mix, Master Percussion, Bass |
| 2022 | Queen of Jeans | Hiding in Place EP | Memory Music | Producer, Recording Engineer, Mix, Master |
| 2024 | Queen of Jeans | All Again | Memory Music | Production, Recording Engineer, Mix, Master, Programming, Percussion, Keyboard |
| 2017 | Quicksand | Interiors | Epitaph Records | Producer, Recording Engineer, Mix, |
| 2021 | Quicksand | Distant Populations | Epitaph | Producer, Recording Engineer |
| 2018 | Quicksand | Triptych Continuum | Epitaph Records | Producer, Recording Engineer, Mix, |
| 2021 | Quicksand | Inversion | Epitaph Records | Producer, Recording Engineer |
| 2009 | The Ragbirds | Finally Almost Ready | Buffalo Records | Recording Engineer |
| 2011 | Reckless Aggression | EP Re-release | Six Feet Under Records | Master |
| 2016 | Saosin | Along the Shadow | Epitaph | Writer, Vocal Producer and Engineer |
| 2022 | Sasami | Squeeze | Domino Recording Company | Mix |
| 2016 | Say Anything | I Don't Think It Is | Equal Vision Records | Mixer |
| 2023 | Scowl | Psychic Dance Routine EP | Flatspot Records | Producer, Recording Engineer, Composer, Mix, Master |
| 2025 | Scowl | Are We All Angels | Dead Oceans | Producer, Recording Engineer, Composer, Percussion, Keyboard |
| 2016 | Secret Space | The Window Room | Equal Vision Records | Producer, Recording Engineer, Mix, Master, Composer |
| 2020 | Seer Believer | Bent | Memory Music | Master, Post-Production |
| 2023 | Skrillex | Don't Get Too Close | Atlantic | Producer, Recording Engineer |
| 2022 | Soul Blind | Feel It All Around | Other People Records | Producer, Recording Engineer, Mix, Master, Composer |
| 2022 | Soul Glo | Diaspora Problems | Epitaph | Mix, Master |
| 2013/2014 | Superheaven | Jar | Run For Cover | Producer, Recording Engineer, Master |
| 2015 | Superheaven | Ours Is Chrome | Side One Dummy | Producer, Recording Engineer, Mix, Master |
| 2025 | Superheaven | Superheaven | Blue Grape Music | Vocal Production, Recording Engineer |
| 2009 | Schoolly D | International Supersport | Blingnot Media | Recording Engineer, Drums |
| 2012 | Swarm of Arrows | The Great Seekers of Lesser Life | Dullest Records | Producer, Recording Engineer, Mix |
| 2008 | The Starting Line | Somebody's Gonna Miss Us Live CD/DVD | Image Ent | Recording Engineer |
| 2016 | The Starting Line | Anyways | Downtown Records | Producer, Recording Engineer, Mix, Master |
| 2021 | The Starting Line | Based On A True Story Live at Studio 4 | Memory Music | Producer, Recording Engineer, Mix, Master |
| 2021 | The Starting Line | Direction Live at Studio 4 | Memory Music | Producer, Recording Engineer, Mix, Master |
| 2021 | The Starting Line | The Best Of Live at Studio 4 | Memory Music | Producer, Recording Engineer, Mix, Master |
| 2025 | The Starting Line | Eternal Youth | Self Released | Producer, Recording Engineer |
| 2014 | Tigers Jaw | Charmer | Run For Cover | Producer, Recording Engineer, Mix |
| 2015 | Tigers Jaw | The Cure Cover Split | Bad Timing | Producer, Recording Engineer, Mix, Master |
| 2016 | Tigers Jaw | Studio 4 Acoustic Session | Memory Music | Producer, Recording Engineer, Mix, Master |
| 2017 | Tigers Jaw | Spin | Black Cement Records | Producer, Recording Engineer, Mix, Composer |
| 2019 | Tigers Jaw | Eyes Shut | Tigers Jaw | Producer, Recording Engineer, Mix, Composer |
| 2021 | Tigers Jaw | Warn Me (Single) | Hopeless Records | Producer, Recording Engineer, Mix |
| 2021 | Tigers Jaw | I Won't Care How You Remember Me | Hopeless Records | Producer, Recording Engineer, Mix, Composer |
| 2022 | Tigers Jaw | Old Clothes EP | Hopeless Records | Producer, Recording Engineer, Mix, Composer |
| 2026 | Tigers Jaw | Lost On You | Hopeless Records | Producer, Mix, Composer |
| 2011 | Title Fight | Shed | Side One Dummy | Assistant Producer, Recording Engineer, Mix |
| 2011 | Title Fight | Flood of 72 EP | Side One Dummy | Assistant Producer, Recording Engineer, Mix, Master |
| 2012 | Title Fight | Floral Green | Side One Dummy | Producer, Recording Engineer, Mix |
| 2013 | Title Fight | Touché Amoré / Title Fight (Split with Touché Amoré) | Sea Legs | Producer, Recording Engineer, Mix, Master |
| 2013 | Title Fight | Spring Songs | Revelation Records | Producer, Recording Engineer, Mix, Master |
| 2015 | Title Fight | Hyperview | ANTI- | Producer, Recording Engineer, Mix, Composer |
| 2023 | Title Fight | "Kingston" 7in Reissue | Purple Circle Records | Master |
| 2013 | Touché Amoré | Touché Amoré / Title Fight (Split with Title Fight) | Sea Legs | Master |
| 2015 | Touché Amoré | Touché Amoré / Self Defense Family (Split with Self Defense Family) | Deathwish Inc. | Producer, Recording Engineer, Mix, Master |
| 2014 | Turnover | Blue Dream | Broken Rim Records | Producer, Recording Engineer, Mix |
| 2013 | Turnover | Magnolia | Run For Cover Records | Producer, Recording Engineer, Mix |
| 2015 | Turnover | Peripheral Vision | Run For Cover Records | Producer, Recording Engineer, Mix, Writer |
| 2016 | Turnover | Humblest Pleasures | Memory Music/Run For Cover | Producer, Recording Engineer, Mix, Master, Writer |
| 2017 | Turnover | Good Nature | Run For Cover Records | Producer, Recording Engineer, Mix, Writer |
| 2019 | Turnover | Altogether | Run For Cover Records | Producer, Recording Engineer, Mix, Writer, Percussion |
| 2022 | Turnover | Myself in the Way | Run For Cover Records | Producer, Recording Engineer, Mix, Composer |
| 2016 | Turnstile | Move Thru Me | Pop Wig | Producer, Recording Engineer, Mixer, Vocalist |
| 2018 | Turnstile | Time and Space | Roadrunner Records | Producer, Recording Engineer, Mixer, Programming |
| 2020 | Turnstile & Mall Grab | Share a View | Roadrunner Records | Recording Engineer |
| 2025 | Turnstile | Never Enough | Roadrunner Records | Add.Producer, Recording Engineer |
| 2020 | Violent Soho | Everything Is A OK | Pure Noise Records | Mix |
| 2011 | War Hungry | LP | Six Feet Under Records | Producer, Recording Engineer, Mix, Master |
| 2023 | Wayside | What Does Your Soul Look Like. | Nature Girl Records | Producer, Recording Engineer, Mix, Writer, Percussion, Backing Vocals |
| 2021 | Webbed Wing | What's So Fucking Funny? | Memory Music | Producer, Recording Engineer, Mix, Master, Percussion |
| 2023 | Webbed Wing | Right After I Smoke This EP | Memory Music | Producer, Recording Engineer, Mix, Master |
| 2024 | Webbed Wing | Vol. III | Memory Music | Producer, Recording Engineer, Mix, Master, Percussion, Keyboard |
| 2018 | Wicca Phase Springs Eternal | Spider Web EP | Dark Medicine | Mix, Master |
| 2019 | Wicca Phase Springs Eternal | Suffer On | Run For Cover Records | Producer, Recording Engineer, Mix, Drums, Backing Vocals |
| 2019 | Wicca Phase Springs Eternal | I Fell (Theme Song for Darby Allin) | AEW | Producer, Recording Engineer, Mix, Master Drums |
| 2020 | Wicca Phase Springs Eternal | This Moment I Miss | Run For Cover Records | Mix, Master |
| 2014 | Whirr | Sway | Graveface Records | Mix |
| 2014 | Whirr / Nothing | Split | Run For Cover Records | Producer, Recording Engineer, Mix, Master |
| 2010 | The Wonder Years | The Upsides | Hopeless Records | Recording Engineer |
| 2012 | The Wonder Years | Manton St | Run For Cover Records | Recording Engineer |
| 2023 | The Wonder Years | The Hum Goes On Forever | Hopeless | Producer, Recording Engineer |
| 2016 | Young and Heartless | Stay Away | Hopeless Records | Producer, Recording Engineer, Mix, Master |
| 2013 | Various Artists | Off The Board: A Studio 4 Family Compilation | Self-Released | Producer, Recording Engineer, Mix, Instrumentalist |
| 2026 | Sleeping with Sirens | An Ending in Itself | Rise Records | Producer, Recording Engineer |
| 2026 | Movements | Happier Now | Fearless Records | Producer, Mix, Recording Engineer |
