= Beautiful Things (album) =

Studio album by Anthony Green
- Released: January 17, 2012
- Recorded: 2009 – Early January 2011 'The Big House' in Avalon, NJ
- Genre: Indie
- Label: Photo Finish
- Producer: Jason Cupp

Anthony Green chronology
Avalon (2008)	Beautiful Things (2012)	Young Legs (2012)

Beautiful December EP cover

Beautiful Things is the second studio album by Circa Survive's vocalist, Anthony Green. It was released on January 17, 2012, and peaked at No. 27 on the Billboard 200 chart.

The album features Keith Goodwin, Dan Schwartz and Tim Arnold from the band Good Old War as his backing band.

An early mix of the song "Big Mistake" was released digitally on July 7, 2011.

The first single, "Get Yours While You Can", was released on November 15, 2011. A music video for this song was made by the director Isaac Ravishankara in late November 2011 in Brooklyn and was released on January 31, 2012.

Chino Moreno of Deftones, Nate Ruess of fun., Norwegian rock artist Ida Maria and fellow Circa Survive musician Colin Frangicetto are the confirmed guests appearing on the bonus tracks of the record.

The entire album was put up for streaming on Green's website on January 11, 2012.

== Track listing ==
No.	Title	Length
1.	"If I Don't Sing"	3:27
2.	"Do It Right"	2:15
3.	"Moon Song"	4:44
4.	"Get Yours While You Can" (featuring Dave Davison)	3:16
5.	"When I'm on Pills"	3:22
6.	"Can't Have It All at Once"	3:45
7.	"Big Mistake"	3:25
8.	"Love You No Matter What"	2:04
9.	"How It Goes" (featuring Colin Frangicetto)	3:55
10.	"Just to Feel Alive" (featuring Lights)	3:06
11.	"James' Song"	1:40
12.	"Blood Song"	3:21
13.	"Lullaby"	2:30
Total length:		40:55

Bonus tracks (deluxe digital edition)
No.	Title	Length
14.	"Right Outside" (featuring Chino Moreno)	3:18
15.	"Only Love" (featuring Nate Ruess)	4:13
16.	"Soul 4 My Soul" (featuring Colin Frangicetto)	4:10
17.	"Can't Be Satisfied" (featuring Ida Maria)	3:18
18.	"Can't Be Satisfied" (Demo)	3:04
19.	"Can't Have It All at Once" (Demo)	3:32
20.	"Get Yours While You Can" (Demo)	4:25
21.	"Moon Song" (Demo)	3:08
Total length:		70:04

Beautiful December EP
No.	Title	Length
1.	"Get Yours While You Can" (Studio 1290 Acoustic)	3:00
2.	"Moon Song" (Studio 1290 Acoustic)	4:23
3.	"When I'm On Pills" (Studio 1290 Acoustic)	3:00
4.	"James' Song" (Studio 1290 Acoustic)	1:51
5.	"Love You No Matter What" (Studio 1290 Acoustic)	1:51
Total length:		14:03
