= Avalon (Anthony Green album) =

Studio album by Anthony Green
- Released: August 5, 2008
- Recorded: Late-February & Mid-March 2008 Canon Road Recording Studios in Avalon, New Jersey
- Genre: Indie
- Length: 65:21
- Label: Photo Finish
- Producers: Anthony Green, Joe Dell'aquila

Anthony Green chronology
Avalon (2008)	Beautiful Things (2012)

Avalon Remix cover

Professional ratings
Review scores
Source	Rating
AbsolutePunk.net	(79%)
Stereokill	3.5/5 stars

Avalon is the debut solo album by American musician Anthony Green, released on August 5, 2008 on Photo Finish Records.

Avalon features guest appearances from Keith Goodwin, Tim Arnold, and Dan Schwartz of Good Old War, and Green began a US tour to coincide with the release. Avalon was leaked in its entirety on August 1, 2008, four days before its official release.

Avalon was made available as a vinyl LP with a package including the limited vinyl LP and a digital remix CD of Avalon with remixes created by Colin Frangicetto, Green's bandmate in Circa Survive.

== Track listing ==
No.	Title	Length
1.	"She Loves Me So"	3:52
2.	"Dear Child (I've Been Trying to Reach You) [2003 Version]"	3:23
3.	"Drug Dealer"	2:52
4.	"Stonehearted Man"	3:24
5.	"Babygirl"	3:29
6.	"Miracle Sun"	3:42
7.	"Califone"	3:31
8.	"Springtime Out the Van Window"	4:28
9.	"Slowing Down (Long Time Coming)"	1:44
10.	"The First Day of Work at the Microscope Store"	3:09
11.	"Devil's Song (This Feels Like a Nightmare)"	5:25
Total length:		38:59

High & Driving EP
No.	Title	Length
12.	"Babygirl"	2:32
13.	"First Day of Work at the Microscope Store (Dancing for the Cameras on the Traffic Lights)"	1:44
14.	"The Fisherman Will Be Bewildered"	3:32
15.	"Plays Ugly for Daddy"	2:48

Demos
No.	Title	Length
16.	"She Loves Me So (demo)"	3:34
17.	"Stonehearted Man (demo)"	4:06
18.	"Slowing Down (demo)"	1:58
19.	"Devils Song (demo)"	2:47

Bonus Track
No.	Title	Length
20.	"Dear Child (I've Been Dying to Reach You) [Good Old War Version]"	3:27
Total length:		65:21

The Jackie Haenn Medical Fund B-Sides
No.	Title	Length
1.	"Ripped Apart"	3:12
2.	"Take a Giant Step (The Monkees cover)"	1:35
Total length:		4:47

Avalon Remix
No.	Title	Length
1.	"She Loves Me So"	3:49
2.	"Dear Child (I've Been Dying to Reach You)"	4:13
3.	"Drug Dealer"	3:01
4.	"Stonehearted Man"	3:35
5.	"Babygirl"	3:41
6.	"Miracle Sun"	4:20
7.	"Califone"	4:12
8.	"Slowing Down (Long Time Coming)"	3:29
9.	"The First Day of Work at the Microscope Store"	3:07
10.	"Devil's Song (This Feels Like a Nightmare)"	4:29
11.	"Ripped Apart"	4:39
Total length:		42:30

=== CD video extras ===
1. "Dear Child (I've Been Dying to Reach You) - Making of the Video" - 3-minute-long behind the scenes
2. "Avalon - Making of the Album" - 10-minute-long documentary
