= Pixie Queen =

Studio album by Anthony Green
- Released: September 9, 2016
- Recorded: 2015–2016
- Genre: Indie, emo
- Label: Memory Music
- Producer: Will Yip

Anthony Green chronology
Young Legs (2013)	Pixie Queen (2016)

Pixie Queen is the fourth studio album by Circa Survive's lead vocalist, Anthony Green. It was released on September 9, 2016. The first single, "You'll Be Fine", was released under Will Yip's label, Memory Music (an imprint of Run for Cover Records). The whole album was streamed on August 31, 2016.

== Track listing ==
No.	Title	Length
1.	"You'll Be Fine"	4:38
2.	"I'm Not Holding You Back"	3:48
3.	"Will It Be"	2:08
4.	"A Reason to Stay"	3:29
5.	"East Coast Winters"	3:34
6.	"Dawn on the Canal"	3:03
7.	"From What I Understand"	3:15
8.	"Cellar"	3:16
9.	"Better Half"	3:21
10.	"I'm Sorry for Everything I've Ever Done"	3:04
11.	"Pixie Queen"	5:03
Total length:		38:41

== Charts ==
Chart (2016)	Peak position
US Billboard 200	171
