= Descensus =

Descensus (Latin, "descent") may refer to:

- Descensus controversy, Arminianism in the Church of England
- Descensus Christi, Harrowing of Hell
- Descensus (album), a 2014 album by Circa Survive
