= All Again =

Studio album by Queen of Jeans
- Released: June 28, 2024
- Studio: Studio 4 Recording, Conshohocken, Pennsylvania, US
- Genre: Indie rock
- Length: 39:29
- Language: English
- Label: Memory Music
- Producer: Will Yip

Queen of Jeans chronology
Hiding Place (2022)	All Again (2024)

This album is in part a concept album about a relationship and the passage of time — how it can make the truth of it more warped. You may have left the relationship thinking you were the hero and that they were the villain but the mind tends to filter things differently over time. Not only does it become less of a black-and-white narrative in your head, but you also tend to have more compassion for them and for yourself the more time that passes.

— Vocalist Miri Devora on themes of All Again.

All Again is a 2024 studio album by American indie rock band Queen of Jeans. It has received positive review from critics.

== Reception ==
At BrooklynVegan, Andrew Sacher included the notable releases of the week stating that while the lyrical themes are emotionally difficult, "the music goes down easy, with one song after the next rooted in the blissful dream pop of bands like Alvvays". Grace Robins-Somerville of Paste rated All Again a 7.7 out of 10, stating that "this is the record where Queen Of Jeans have mastered both the banger-to-ballad ratio, and the banger-to-ballad transition" and suggested that listeners will put this album on repeat. Editors at Stereogum chose this for Album of the Week and critic Danielle Chelosky called the music "enchanting, angsty indie rock tinged with emo sensibility" that has "exhilarating momentum" and makes for an album that is "resentful, nostalgic, frustrated, disoriented".

== Track listing ==
All songs written by Queen of Jeans

1. "All My Friends" – 4:32
2. "Horny Hangover" – 3:18
3. "Karaoke" – 3:43
4. "Enough to Go Around" – 2:57
5. "Neighbors" – 3:50
6. "Let Me Forget" – 3:05
7. "Books in Bed" – 4:03
8. "Bitter Pill" – 4:09
9. "Go Down Easy" – 4:23
10. "Last to Try" – 3:33
11. "Do It All Again" – 00:56

== Personnel ==
Queen of Jeans

- Miri Devora – guitar, keyboards, vocals
- Matheson Glass – lead guitar, piano
- Andrew Nitz – bass guitar, keyboards
- Patrick Wall – drums

Additional personnel

- Justin Bartlett – backing vocals audio engineering
- Jess Lim – photography
- Brooke Marsh – photography
- Jack Nitz – photography
- Dylan Savopoulos – layout
- Will Yip – percussion, programming, audio engineering, mixing, production, audio mastering

== See also ==
- 2024 in American music
- List of 2024 albums
