= Something to Consume =

Studio album by Die Spitz
- Released: September 12, 2025
- Genres: Punk rock; grunge; heavy metal
- Length: 34:04
- Label: Third Man
- Producer: Will Yip

Die Spitz chronology
Teeth (2023)	Something to Consume (2025)

Singles from Something to Consume
- 1. "Throw Yourself to the Sword" Released: July 10, 2025; 2. "Pop Punk Anthem (Sorry for the Delay)" Released: August 6, 2025; 3. "Punishers" Released: August 27, 2025

Something to Consume is the debut studio album by American alternative rock band Die Spitz. It was released on September 12, 2025, via Third Man Records in cassette, vinyl, CD and digital formats. Three singles, "Throw Yourself to the Sword", "Pop Punk Anthem (Sorry for the Delay)", and "Punishers" were released prior to the album's release.

== Background ==
The album was produced by Will Yip, and is the band's first full-length album after two EPs. "Throw Yourself to the Sword" was released as the lead single on July 10, 2025. It was followed by second single "Pop Punk Anthem (Sorry for the Delay)" on August 6, 2025, and third single "Punishers" on August 27, 2025, alongside a music video.

== Reception ==
Professional ratings
Review scores
Source	Rating
Clash	8/10
DIY	4/5 stars
Kerrang	4/5
New Noise	5/5 stars

Clash's Paulina Subia described the album as "a doom metal thrasher straight out of Electric Wizard's universe, packed with machine gun riffs, pummeling drums and seething vocals" and "a brilliant debut, ambitious in the best of ways," giving it a rating of eight out of ten. In her four-star review of Something to Consume for DIY, Sarah Jamieson referred it as "fierce" and "fearless", noting it enabled the band to bring their "vision into sharp relief."

Writing for Kerrang, Rishi Shah noted the album as "a thunderous, cathartic debut that remains subtly political and emotive while prioritizing surface-level pandemonium," rating it four out of five. Under the Radar commented that the album represents "a record that fuses serrated punk edge with grunge's murkier hues and a politically conscious undercurrent."

The album received a five-star rating from New Noise, whose reviewer Justice Petersen remarked about its "hypnotic and hard-hitting identity", stating it "firmly cements the band as one of the most exciting up-and-comers within the modern rock landscape."

== Track listing ==
Something to Consume track listing
No.	Title	Writer(s)	Length
1.	"Pop Punk Anthem (Sorry for the Delay)"	Ava Schrobilgen	3:50
2.	"Voir Dire"	Chloe de St. Aubin	3:00
3.	"Throw Yourself to the Sword"	Ellie Livingston	2:40
4.	"American Porn"	De St. Aubin; Schrobilgen	3:42
5.	"Sound to No One"	Livingston	4:04
6.	"Go Get Dressed"	Schrobligen	2:31
7.	"Red40"	Schrobilgen	2:03
8.	"Riding with My Girls"	Livingston; Schrobilgen	3:05
9.	"Punishers"	De St. Aubin; Kate Halter	3:10
10.	"Down on It"	Livingston	2:17
11.	"A Strange Moon/Selenophilia"	De St. Aubin	3:42
Total length:			34:04

== Personnel ==
Credits adapted from Tidal.

=== Die Spitz ===
- Chloe de St. Aubin – drums (tracks 1, 3–8, 10), lead vocals (2, 9, 11), electric guitar (2, 9), bongos (11)
- Kate Halter – bass (all tracks)
- Eleanor Livingston – guitar (all tracks), lead vocals (3, 5, 8, 10)
- Ava Schrobilgen – guitar (1, 3–8, 10), lead vocals (1, 4, 6, 7), drums (2, 9, 11)

=== Additional contributor ===
- Will Yip – production

== Charts ==
Chart performance for Something to Consume
Chart (2025)	Peak position
UK Album Downloads (Official Charts)	59
UK Independent Albums (Official Charts)	39
UK Rock & Metal Albums (Official Charts)	22
