= The Amulet (album) =

Studio album by Circa Survive
- Released: September 22, 2017
- Studio: Studio 4
- Genre: Alternative rock; progressive rock; post-hardcore
- Length: 42:52
- Label: Hopeless
- Producer: Will Yip

Circa Survive chronology
Descensus (2014)	The Amulet (2017)	Two Dreams (2022)

Professional ratings
Aggregate scores
Source	Rating
Metacritic	70/100
Review scores
Source	Rating
AllMusic	3.5/5 stars
Alternative Press	3.5/5 stars
Kerrang!	3/5 stars
Sputnikmusic	4.1/5

The Amulet is the sixth studio album by American rock band Circa Survive, released on September 22, 2017. The Amulet is Circa Survive's first album released through Hopeless Records, after departing their previous label, Sumerian Records. As with previous Circa Survive albums, Esao Andrews created the album artwork.

== Release ==
In a September 2016 Reddit AMA, Anthony Green announced that a new Circa Survive album would be forthcoming. The band announced The Amulet on July 10, 2017, and the album announcement was accompanied by the first single and music video, "Lustration." The next month, they released "Rites of Investiture," with a music video made from a 1994 short film directed by Green's cousin Jonathan Michaels. The title track was released on August 30, accompanied by a video shot at a fireworks convention in Fargo, North Dakota. The last single before the album's release, "Premonition of the Hex," debuted on September 14, with a video directed by Josh Call. The video, which depicts a cult, was meant to "showcase the dangers of fundamentalism and extremism."

The band announced a co-headlining tour with Thrice, accompanied by Balance and Composure and Chon, across North America beginning in San Jose on November 2, 2017.

== Track listing ==
All music is composed by Circa Survive.

No.	Title	Length
1.	"Lustration"	5:33
2.	"Never Tell a Soul"	3:49
3.	"Premonition of the Hex"	3:49
4.	"Tunnel Vision"	3:35
5.	"At Night It Gets Worse"	5:54
6.	"Stay"	2:38
7.	"Rites of Investiture"	4:10
8.	"The Hex"	3:46
9.	"Flesh and Bone"	5:08
10.	"The Amulet"	4:30
Total length:		42:52

Deluxe Edition Bonus Tracks
No.	Title	Length
11.	"Dark Pools"	4:50
12.	"Indra's Net"	4:58
Total length:		52:40

== Charts ==
Chart (2017)	Peak position
US Billboard 200	26
US Independent Albums (Billboard)	3
US Top Alternative Albums (Billboard)	5
US Top Rock Albums (Billboard)	4

== Personnel ==
Circa Survive

- Anthony Green – lead vocals
- Colin Frangicetto – rhythm guitar, backing vocals
- Brendan Ekstrom – lead guitar
- Nick Beard – bass guitar, backing vocals
- Steve Clifford – drums, percussion

Additional musicians

- Kenny Vasoli – guitar

Production

- Will Yip – producer, engineer, mix engineer
- Vince Ratti – mix engineer
- Ryan Smith – mastering

Design

- Esao Andrews – artwork, art direction
- Michael Lopez – album layout, art direction
