= Die Spitz =

American rock band

- Die Spitz at the Eurockéennes de Belfort 2025 (L-R: Chloe de St. Aubin, Eleanor Livingston, Ava Schrobilgen, Kate Halter)

Background information
- Origin: Austin, Texas, U.S.
- Genres: Grunge; punk rock; heavy metal
- Years active: 2022–present
- Label: Third Man
- Members: Ava Schrobilgen; Eleanor Livingston; Kate Halter; Chloe de St. Aubin
- Website: diespitz.com

Die Spitz is an American rock band from Austin, Texas, consisting of guitarist/singer/drummer Ava Schrobilgen, guitarist/singer Eleanor Livingston, bassist Kate Halter, and drummer/singer/guitarist Chloe de St. Aubin. Their debut album Something to Consume was released in September 2025.

== History ==
Schrobilgen and Livingston have known each other since age three and met Halter in middle school; de St. Aubin was a later social media friend. They formed the band in 2022, and their name Die Spitz is misspelled German for "the pointed" or "the tip". (The correct German spelling is „Die Spitze“.) Several media outlets have reported that the band formed when the members were inspired by the Mötley Crüe biopic The Dirt, though the band disdains this origin story.

Their first EP Revenge of Evangeline was released in late 2022 and attracted widespread notice in their home city of Austin, Texas, leading to frequent local performances and several appearances at the annual SXSW festival. The band has been noted for featuring three lead singers on alternating songs, while de St. Aubin and Schrobilgen trade instruments on some songs. In 2023 they released another EP titled Teeth, which won an Album of the Year award in Austin the following year. They have opened tours for bands including Amyl and the Sniffers, Off!, and Sleater-Kinney. A tour of England in 2025 attracted the attention of Metal Hammer, which called Die Spitz "the best new band in the world." They signed with Third Man Records in early 2025, and worked with producer Will Yip on their debut full-length album Something to Consume, which was released in September of that year.

Paste magazine has praised Die Spitz as "the real, explosive deal, unleashing some of the best rock and roll that Gen Z has to offer." Spin has called the band "one of the most riotous new live bands on the planet."

== Musical style and influences ==
Reviewers have categorized Die Spitz's music as grunge, heavy metal, and punk rock. The band members have disputed their categorization as punk due to their focus on melody and composition, and their interests in a wide variety of genres. The band lists influences ranging from heavy metal to pop-punk to grunge. They have cited specific influences including Title Fight, Fleshwater, Deftones, Mudhoney, PJ Harvey, Nirvana, Veruca Salt, Ozzy Osbourne, Black Sabbath, and Iron Maiden. Stereogum writer Brad Sanders put them among his "New Heavy Metal Movie Canon" stating that "Sometimes Die Spitz sound like Megadeth or High On Fire; sometimes they sound like L7 or Babes In Toyland or Tool or Soundgarden. Often, they sound like a combination of all the above."

Their lyrics are informed by political activism, leading some journalists to draw comparisons with the 1990s riot grrl movement. The Fader has described the band's lyrics as "a wrecking ball against oppression and the tyranny of dark forces that suppress others."

== Members ==
- Ava Schrobilgen – guitar, vocals, occasional drums
- Eleanor Livingston – guitar, vocals
- Kate Halter – bass
- Chloe de St. Aubin – drums, vocals, occasional guitar

== Discography ==
Albums

- Something to Consume (2025)

EPs

- Revenge of Evangeline (EP, 2022)
- Teeth (EP, 2023)
