= Queen of Jeans =

American indie rock band

Queen of Jeans is an American indie rock band from Philadelphia, Pennsylvania.

The band released their self-titled debut EP in 2016. In 2018, the group released their debut album, titled Dig Yourself. The band released their second full-length album If You're Not Afraid, I'm Not Afraid in 2019. In 2022, the group released an EP titled Hiding in Place. The band's latest album, All Again, was released in 2024. and was named "Album of the Week" by Stereogum.
