= Days Away =

American indie rock band

- Origin: Langhorne, Pennsylvania, U.S.
- Genres: Progressive rock, indie rock
- Years active: 1997–present
- Label: Fueled by Ramen
- Members: Tim Arnold; Chris Frangicetto; Keith Goodwin; Bryan Gulla; Jake Weiss
- Past members: Matt Haines; Greg Itzen; Matt Austin; Matt Robnett
- Website: daysawaymusic.com

Days Away was an American indie rock band based in Langhorne, Pennsylvania, formed in 1998.

== Biography ==
Days Away formed in 1998 in Langhorne, Pennsylvania. When first formed, the group consisted of Keith Goodwin (vocals/guitar), Matt Austin (guitar), Matt Haines (drums) and Chris Frangicetto (bass). Eventually the band decided to move to California and signed with We the People Records, where they released The Feel Of It EP in 2002. A year later, Tim Arnold joined the band playing keyboards for a short while. Soon after, Arnold moved to drums and the band released the 'L.S.D.' EP. Bryan Gulla then joined on keyboard. The group toured heavily behind its EPs and received significant exposure on the internet, resulting in their signing with Fueled by Ramen. Their debut album, Mapping An Invisible World, was released in May 2005 on Fueled by Ramen Records. On December 18, 2006 the band announced that they are no longer on the Fueled by Ramen roster, but promised that new Days Away material will be released in the near future. In early 2008, an announcement was made that Days Away had disbanded. Keith Goodwin and Tim Arnold shortly thereafter announced they were working on a new project, Good Old War, with Daniel Schwartz.

Goodwin has made guest vocal appearances on the song 'Left Coast Envy' by The Starting Line and on Lover, the Lord Has Left Us..., the second album by The Sound of Animals Fighting. Bassist Chris Frangicetto's older brother is Colin Frangicetto, guitarist for Circa Survive.

== Band members ==
Current members

- Tim Arnold - Drums
- Chris Frangicetto - Bass
- Keith Goodwin - Vocals/Guitar
- Bryan Gulla - Keyboards
- Jake Weiss - Guitar

Former members

- Matt Haines - Drums
- Greg Itzen - Rhythm Guitar
- Matt Austin - Lead Guitar
- Matt Robnett - Rhythm Guitar

== Discography ==
- The Feel of It EP (2002)
- L.S.D.E.P. (2003)
- E.S.P.E.P. (2005)
- Mapping an Invisible World (2005)
- Ear Candy for the Headphone Trippers (2007)

=== Other songs ===
- "To Ramona" from Listen to Bob Dylan: A Tribute
- "Honesty"
