= This Day Forward =

American rock band

- Origin: Philadelphia, Pennsylvania, U.S.
- Genres: Metalcore, post-hardcore
- Years active: 1996–2003, 2024-
- Labels: EVR, Eulogy, Break Even Records
- Members: Mike Shaw – vocals Colin Frangicetto – drums Gary Shaw – bass guitar Brendan Ekstrom – guitar Vadim Taver – guitar
- Past members: Mike Golen – guitar Randy Wehrs – guitar Sean McGuigan – bass guitar on tours 2000–2001

This Day Forward was a Philadelphia-area band active from 1996 to 2003 whose style varied from metalcore to post-hardcore with indie rock influences.

== History ==
The band was formed in 1996 in the Philadelphia suburbs by brothers Mike and Gary Shaw on vocals and bass guitar, respectively, with Randy Wehrs and Mike Golen on guitars and Colin Frangicetto on drums. They initially played local venues, recording their first demo in 1998 and releasing their first full-length album, Fragments Of An Untold Story Born By Shunning The Opportunity, in 1999 on Break Even Records. This was a raw combination of metalcore and screamed vocals, often compared to Converge, but arguably with more melodic riffs. Soon after, the band was signed to Eulogy Recordings and released The Transient Effects of Light on Water in 2000. Being on Eulogy allowed them to play larger shows, such as Hellfest 2000 in Syracuse, and they quickly developed a devoted fan base outside of their home area.

Shortly after the release of Transient Effects, Vadim Taver, a friend of the band and former guitarist of the metal band A Life Once Lost (also from the Philadelphia area) joined This Day Forward and, in 2002, this new line-up released the Kairos EP. While Transient Effects had been a progression from the first release but had stayed more or less true to the same style, Kairos was a definite shift. The riffs were often more subtle and not strictly metal-influenced, and the songs, while still generally heavy, were interspersed with many softer parts. In addition, Shaw varied the vocals greatly, incorporating clean singing and an almost spoken-word-like yelling in addition to his original throaty scream. The album was well received by critics and featured Thursday's Geoff Rickly doing guest vocals at the end of the song "Sunfalls and Watershine", which received a fair amount of play on college radio stations.

This Day Forward signed to Equal Vision Records in late 2002 with a new guitarist, Brendan Ekstrom, formerly of 200 North, by which time they had already completed several US tours, and in the following year released In Response. This album strayed even farther from their initial sound, largely abandoning the screams and incorporating more traditional song structures as well as softer backing vocals by Taver. As a result, the band was predictably accused of selling out by some fans, though others still consider it their best and most original work. In the months following the album, the band toured extensively, playing with bands such as Thursday, Murder by Death, Sincebyman and Christiansen before announcing their break up in November. The reasons for this are not well known. Among the rumors circulating were that some members were dissatisfied with In Response or disillusioned with the hardcore scene, but none of these appeared substantiated, although at one of their final shows with Poison the Well, Mike Shaw walked offstage in the middle of a song after a fight broke out, saying, "And then you wonder why bands break up." The band played the final leg of its last tour in December with Alexisonfire, ending with its last show at the First Unitarian Church of Philadelphia, a local music venue where the band had played early in its career.

In 2024, This Day Forward announced they had reunited for two shows in Philadelphia.

== Current projects ==
Although This Day Forward seems to be permanently defunct, nearly all of its members have been involved in various musical endeavors since 2003. Mike Shaw and Golen are working on a musical tentatively titled Chateau, which was expected to be released in late 2022 Shaw has also done guest vocals for a local band, A Trunk Full of Dead Bodies, on an unreleased track called "The First to Dance" which also featured Rachel Minton of Zolof the Rock and Roll Destroyer, and for another local band, I Am Alaska, on a track called "Get Real". Gary Shaw has re-entered the working world, while Frangicetto and Ekstrom have teamed up with the former Saosin vocalist Anthony Green to form Circa Survive. Taver had teamed up in an acoustic emo side project called Superstitions of the Sky with the former Hot Cross guitarist Josh Jakubowski before This Day Forward had split up. He also appeared on Hot Cross's 2004 EP Fair Trades and Farewells, Zolof the Rock and Roll Destroyer's first full-length album Jalopy Go Far and played guitar and performed lead vocals in Marigold before leaving and moving to California in summer 2006. In 2010, Taver'sfirst solo album, Expand, Escape, was released by Falling Leaves Records.

== Line-up ==
- Mike Shaw – vocals
- Gary Shaw – bass guitar
- Vadim Taver – guitar (previously with A Life Once Lost, currently with Poison the Well)
- Brendan Ekstrom – guitar (currently with Circa Survive)
- Colin Frangicetto – drums (currently with Circa Survive)

Past members

- Mike Golen – guitar (first three albums)
- Randy Wehrs – guitar (first two albums)
- Sean McGuigan – bass guitar

== Discography ==
- Fragments of an Untold Story Born by Shunning the Opportunity (Break Even Records, 1999. Re-released by Eulogy Recordings, 2001)
- The Transient Effects of Light on Water (Eulogy Recordings, 2000)
- Kairos EP (Eulogy Recordings, 2002)
- In Response (Equal Vision Records, 2003)

== See also ==
- Circa Survive
