= Good Old War =

American indie folk band

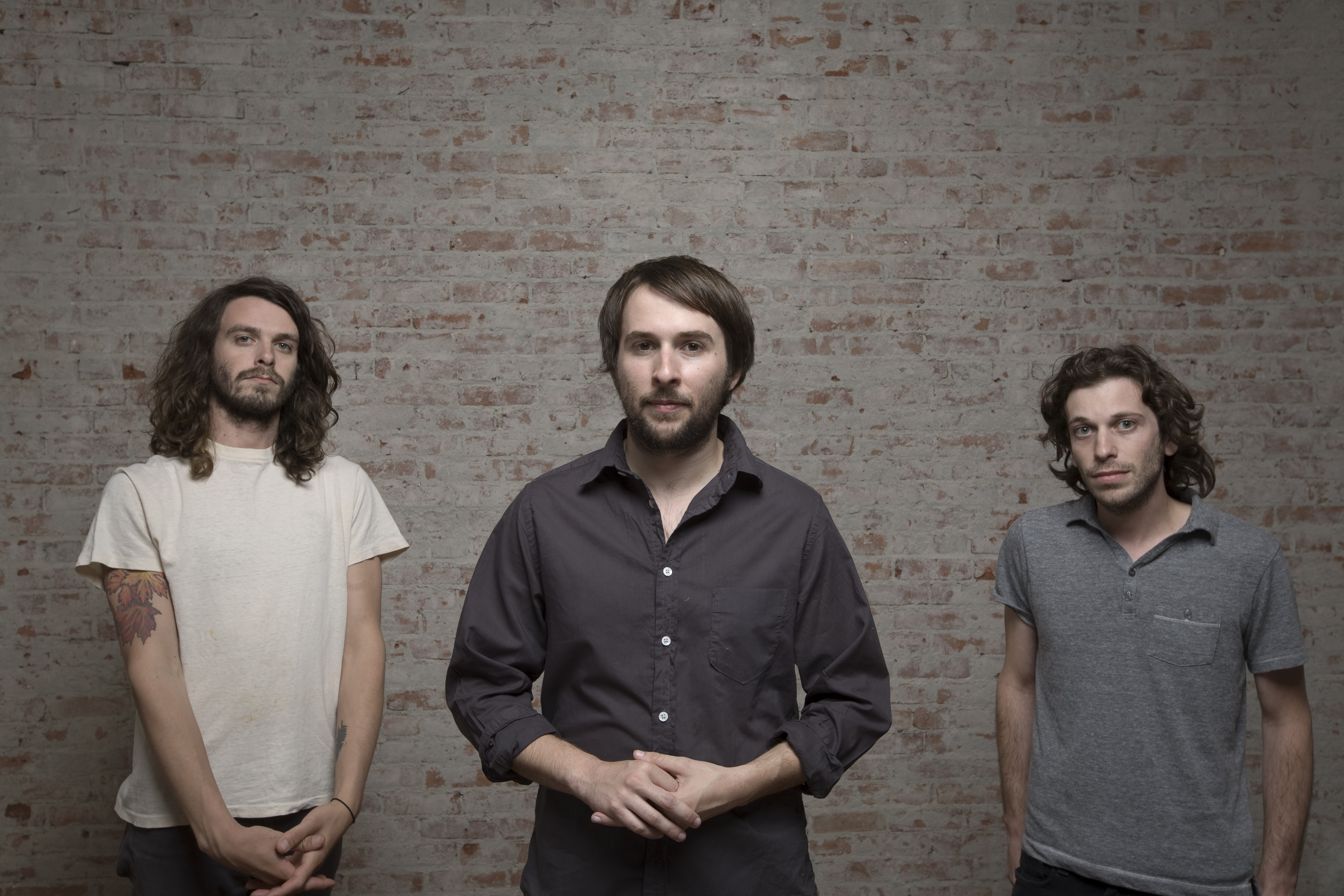

Background information
- Origin: Philadelphia, Pennsylvania, United States
- Genres: Indie folk
- Years active: 2008–2016
- Labels: Nettwerk
- Members: Keith Goodwin; Dan Schwartz; Tim Arnold
- Website: goodoldwar.com

Good Old War was an American indie folk band from Philadelphia, Pennsylvania, United States, featuring former members of Days Away.

== History ==
Good Old War is made up of Keith Goodwin, Tim Arnold, and Dan Schwartz. The band's name comes from the last names of the three members; Goodwin Arnold Schwartz. The band was started in 2008 after Days Away (former band of Keith and Tim) went on hiatus; Schwartz previously played in Unlikely Cowboy. They began by recording some free demos in a late-night session at a recording studio, then played with Anthony Green, a fellow Pennsylvania musician, on a short stint of dates along the east coast as well as at the South by Southwest (SXSW) festival in Texas. Good Old War then signed with Sargent House, a label which also served as the band's management company.

The band recorded their debut album in May 2008 in Los Angeles with producer Rick Parker, who also produced the final EP from Days Away, entitled "Ear Candy for the Headphone Trippers." Good Old War then recorded Anthony Green's 2008 album Avalon as his back-up band, and continued to perform as his band in addition to playing direct support as Good Old War with Person L (a project featuring Kenny Vasoli of The Starting Line) for a nationwide headlining tour that began on August 6, 2008, and ran through September 14, 2008.

On November 4, 2008, Good Old War released their first album, Only Way To Be Alone. Anthony Green makes a guest vocal appearance on the track "Weak Man," along with Dave Davison from the band Maps & Atlases, who plays a guest guitar solo in "Weak Man".

Good Old War released their self-titled second album on June 1, 2010, which peaked at No. 150 on the Billboard 200. On April 22, 2010, the band released "My Own Sinking Ship," the first single from their sophomore album made available for free download.

On December 6, 2011, Good Old War debuted a new single entitled "Calling Me Names" from their latest album, Come Back As Rain, on the radio in the Philadelphia area. Good Old War released the entire album on March 6, 2012.

Arnold took a break from the band in 2014 to move to Atlanta in order to raise his family. Later in the year, on October 14, the band announced their return to the studio to record a new album.

In April 2015, Good Old War released their first single, "Tell Me What You Want From Me", from the new album, Broken Into Better Shape. This 10-song collection is the band's fourth album and was released on June 30, 2015, on Nettwerk.

== Band members ==
- Keith Goodwin – vocals, guitar, keyboards (2008–present)
- Dan Schwartz – guitar, vocals (2008–present)
- Tim Arnold – drums, keyboards, accordion, vocals (2008–2014, 2016–present)

== Discography ==
=== Albums ===
Only Way To Be Alone (Sargent House, November 4, 2008)

Track listing

1. "Coney Island"
2. "Just Another Day"
3. "Looking For Shelter"
4. "Weak Man" (feat. Anthony Green & Dave Davison)
5. "I'm Not For You"
6. "We've Come a Long Way"
7. "No Time"
8. "That's What's Wrong"
9. "Maybe Mine"
10. "Tell Me"
11. "Window"
12. "Stay by my Side" (feat. Ali Wadsworth of Unlikely Cowboy and Claire Wadsworth)

Good Old War (Sargent House, June 1, 2010)

Track listing

1. "GOOD"
2. "Here Are the Problems"
3. "My Own Sinking Ship"
4. "Making My Life"
5. "OLD"
6. "That's Some Dream"
7. "Sneaky Louise"
8. "Get Some"
9. "While I'm Away"
10. "Woody's Hood Boogie Woogie"
11. "My Name's Sorrow"
12. "World Watching"
13. "I Should Go"
14. "Thinking of You"
15. "WAR"

Come Back as Rain (Sargent House, March 6, 2012)

Track listing

1. "Over and Over"
2. "Calling Me Names"
3. "Amazing Eyes"
4. "Better Weather"
5. "Can't Go Home"
6. "Not Quite Happiness"
7. "Touch the Clouds (Taste the Ground)"
8. "It Hurts Every Time"
9. "After The Party"
10. "Loud Love"
11. "Present for the End of the World"

Broken Into Better Shape (Nettwerk, June 30, 2015)

Track listing

1. "Tell Me What You Want From Me"
2. "Fly Away"
3. "Never Gonna See Me Cry"
4. "Broken Into Better Shape"
5. "Small World"
6. "Broken Record"
7. "One More Time"
8. "I’m The One"
9. "Dark Days"
10. "Don’t Forget"

=== EPs ===
Good Old War / Cast Spells Split EP (Sargent House, 2009)

Track listing

1. "Breaking Down " (Good Old War)
2. "Texas Blues" (Good Old War)
3. "All Brass" (Cast Spells)
4. "Letters" (Cast Spells)

The Purevolume.com Sessions (2009)

Track listing

1. "Coney Island" (Acoustic)
2. "I'm Not For You" (Acoustic)
3. "Tell Me" (Acoustic)
4. "We've Come A Long Way" (Acoustic)
5. "Window" (Acoustic)

Part of Me (Nettwerk, 2017)

Track listing

1. "The River"
2. "Part of Me"
3. "Only a Number"
4. "How Did You Find Me?"
5. "Oak Tree"

Part of You (Nettwerk, 2018)

Track listing

1. "That Feeling"
2. "In a Heartbeat"
3. "What Does The Future Mean"
4. "You Should Know"
5. "Take It How You Want To"

Part of Us (Nettwerk, 2018)

Track listing

1. "Every Morning"
2. "Ian's Song (Believer)"
3. "Looking Back"
4. "Misty-Eyed"
5. "Halfway To Ruin"

=== Music videos ===
Year	Video	Director
2008	"Coney Island"	Behn Fannin
2009	"Weak Man"	Matthew Stawski
2010	"That's Some Dream"	Behn Fannin
2012	"Calling Me Names"	Elliott Sellers
2012	"Amazing Eyes"	Elliott Sellers
2016	"Never Gonna See Me Cry"	
