= Mapping an Invisible World =

Studio album by Days Away
- Released: May 10, 2005
- Genre: Indie rock, progressive rock
- Length: 41:54
- Label: Fueled by Ramen
- Producer: Neal Avron

Days Away chronology
E.S.P.E.P. (2005)	Mapping an Invisible World (2005)	Ear Candy for the Headphone Trippers (2007)

Professional ratings
Review scores
Source	Rating
AbsolutePunk.net	(95%)

Mapping an Invisible World is a studio album by American indie rock band Days Away. It was released in 2005 on Fueled by Ramen and produced by Neal Avron.

== Track listing ==
(all songs written by Days Away)

1. God and Mars - 2:45
2. Stay the Same - 3:40
3. Gravity - 3:28
4. Ideas - 3:48
5. Keep Your Voices Down - 3:38
6. Mirrors - 3:56
7. It's Not Over - 3:50
8. The Fight - 3:29
9. You Were Right - 3:41
10. It Happens - 3:15
11. T. Kline's Decline - 6:26

== Personnel ==
- Keith Goodwin – Vocals, guitar
- Matt Austin – Guitar
- Chris Frangicetto – Bass
- Tim Arnold – Drums
- Bryan Gulla – Keyboard
