= Ear Candy for the Headphone Trippers =

Ear Candy for the Headphone Trippers EP

EP by Days Away
- Released: October 10, 2007
- Genres: Indie rock, progressive rock
- Length: 16:48
- Producer: Rick Parker

Days Away chronology
Mapping an Invisible World (2005)	Ear Candy for the Headphone Trippers EP (2007)

Ear Candy for the Headphone Trippers was Days Away's first release after they left Fueled By Ramen. It was released on October 10, 2007 with two bonus videos, "God and Mars (Acoustic)" and "I'm Sorry I Told You All My Problems."

== Track listing ==
(all songs written by Days Away)

1. "Wish - 3:08
2. "I'm Sorry I Told You All My Problems - 4:01
3. "I'll Be Lost - 2:40
4. "Being a Part of You - 2:54
5. "Talk It Over - 4:11

== Personnel ==
- Keith Goodwin - vocals, guitar
- Bryan Gulla - keyboards, vocals
- Chris Frangicetto - bass
- Tim Arnold - drums, vocals
- Jake Weiss - guitar
