= In Response =

Studio album by This Day Forward
- Released: June 17, 2003
- Recorded: December 2002–January 2003
- Genre: Post-hardcore
- Label: Equal Vision Records

This Day Forward chronology
The Transient Effects of Light on Water (2000)	In Response (2003)

Professional ratings
Review scores
Source	Rating
Allmusic	link

In Response is the third and final studio album by Philadelphia post-hardcore band This Day Forward.

== Track listing ==
1. White Picket Defense System (3:22)
  - Composed by: Frangicetto, This Day Forward
2. One and One (4:01)
  - Composed by: Frangicetto, This Day Forward
3. The Breath (4:36)
  - Composed by: Frangicetto, Shaw, This Day Forward
4. In the Past ... On the Ground (4:13)
  - Composed by: Frangicetto, Shaw, This Day Forward
5. Euphio Question (2:18)
  - Composed by: Shaw, This Day Forward
6. Fragile Version (4:18)
  - Composed by: Frangicetto, This Day Forward
7. The Red Room (2:16)
  - Composed by Shaw, This Day Forward
8. Abandon the Abbreviated World (3:42)
  - Composed by: Frangicetto, Shaw, This Day Forward
9. Nouveau (4:18)
  - Composed by: Frangicetto, This Day Forward
10. Voice (5:09)
  - Composed by: Frangicetto, Shaw, This Day Forward
11. Seven (3:51)
  - Composed by: This Day Forward
  - Performed by: Vadim Taver

== Musicians who played on the album ==
- Brendan Ekstrom - Guitar
- Colin Frangicetto - Drums
- Gary Shaw - Bass
- Mike Shaw - Vocals
- Vadim Taver - Guitar, Wurlitzer, Vocals

== Reception ==
A positive review came from Punknews.org, who described the album as having "a few odd, experimental tracks", but praised tracks 8–10 as "all complex mashes of melodic hardrock and pure emotional hardcore complete with mind blowing screams from Mike Shaw and huge bombastic breakdowns by the band behind him."
