= The Transient Effects of Light on Water =

Studio album by This Day Forward
- Released: October 27, 2000
- Genre: Metalcore
- Length: 30:32
- Label: Eulogy

This Day Forward chronology
Fragments of an Untold Story Born by Shunning the Opportunity (1999)	The Transient Effects of Light on Water (2000)	In Response (2002)

Professional ratings
Review scores
Source	Rating
Allmusic	3/5 stars

The Transient Effects of Light on Water is a 2000 metalcore album by This Day Forward.

== Track listing ==
1. My Unbroken Reflection (3:57)
2. Cupid's Diary (3:16)
3. Kissing Perfections Cheek (3:09)
4. If I Wore a Mask (4:27)
5. Writing in Cursive (3:35)
6. End of August (2:42)
7. The Effects of Departure from Ideal Proportions (3:29)
8. Significant Others (3:37)
9. Disintegrating Eden (3:40)

== Facts ==
- The album's name comes from a lyric in "My Unbroken Reflection". The lyric comes from a sound recording clip of a lecture spoken by drummer Colin Frangicietto's college teacher.

The clip is of the professor talking about how water is an object always in motion so to capture it on canvas is a hard task. Guitarist Vadim Taver said in an interview with http://silentstagnation.de/ "This was a good analogy to our music because it's hard to capture the energy, power, and emotion of music on recordings. Sometimes people pull it off, but overall it's not the same as seeing a band perform live, and that was the meaning behind the quote."

- Kissing Perfection's Cheek, If I Wore A Mask, and Significant others are re-recorded versions of songs from their debut album, Fragments of an Untold Story Born by Shunning the Opportunity.
- My Unbroken Reflection, Writing In Cursive [which also was on a Break Even Records Compilation], End Of August, and The Effects Of Departure from Ideal Proportions were all on a pre-TTEOLOW Demo handed out at Syracuse, New York's Hellfest.
