= Juturna (album) =

Studio album by Circa Survive
- Released: April 19, 2005
- Recorded: 2004–05 at Salad Days Studio, Beltsville, Maryland
- Genre: Post-hardcore; emo; alternative rock; progressive rock; experimental rock
- Length: 52:33
- Label: Equal Vision
- Producer: Brian McTernan

Circa Survive chronology
The Inuit Sessions EP (2005)	Juturna (2005)	On Letting Go (2007)

Juturna is the debut studio album by American rock band Circa Survive. It was released on April 19, 2005 through Equal Vision Records.

== Track listing ==
No.	Title	Length
1.	"Holding Someone's Hair Back"	3:22
2.	"Act Appalled"	3:20
3.	"Wish Resign"	4:14
4.	"The Glorious Nosebleed"	3:13
5.	"In Fear and Faith"	3:35
6.	"The Great Golden Baby"	4:11
7.	"Stop the Fuckin' Car"	4:22
8.	"We're All Thieves"	4:53
9.	"Oh, Hello"	2:36
10.	"Always Getting What You Want"	4:01
11.	"Meet Me in Montauk" (includes hidden track)	14:39
Total length:		52:33

Professional ratings
Review scores
Source	Rating
AbsolutePunk	80%
AllMusic	2.5/5 stars
Melodic.net	3.5/5 stars
