= On Letting Go =

Studio album by Circa Survive
- Released: May 29, 2007
- Recorded: 2007
- Studio: Salad Days (Baltimore, Maryland)
- Genres: Emo; progressive rock; alternative rock; post-hardcore
- Length: 45:29
- Label: Equal Vision
- Producer: Brian McTernan

Circa Survive chronology
Juturna (2005)	On Letting Go (2007)	Blue Sky Noise (2010)

Professional ratings
Review scores
Source	Rating
AbsolutePunk.net	90% link
AllMusic	link
Alternative Press	link
Kerrang	link
Lambgoat	7/10 link

On Letting Go is the second studio album by American rock band Circa Survive, released on May 29, 2007, through Equal Vision Records. Produced by Brian McTernan, it was recorded throughout 2007 at the Salad Days Recording Studios in Baltimore, Maryland. The album peaked at No. 24 on the U.S. Billboard 200, selling about 24,000 copies in its first week.

The album combines elements of post-hardcore, progressive rock, and emo. In celebration of its 10-year anniversary, Circa Survive announced the On Letting Go Ten Year Anniversary Tour with support from MewithoutYou and Turnover, which took place from January to March 2017. The group also re-released the album in May 2017, with additional demos and unreleased bonus tracks.

== Track listing ==
All tracks are written by Circa Survive.

No.	Title	Length
1.	"Living Together"	3:30
2.	"In the Morning and Amazing…"	4:03
3.	"The Greatest Lie"	3:42
4.	"The Difference Between Medicine and Poison Is in the Dose"	4:17
5.	"Mandala"	3:23
6.	"Travel Hymn"	3:12
7.	"Semi Constructive Criticism"	3:22
8.	"Kicking Your Crosses Down"	3:37
9.	"On Letting Go"	4:03
10.	"Carry Us Away"	3:20
11.	"Close Your Eyes to See"	3:34
12.	"Your Friends Are Gone"	5:26
Total length:		45:29

== Production ==
- The album art is the work of Esao Andrews, who illustrated the covers of all other releases by the band.
- On May 14, 2007, the band decided to post the lyrics to the then upcoming album on their website, one song a day, starting with the opener "Living Together".
- The album has so far produced two B-sides, both sold digitally for separate charitable causes: "The Most Dangerous Commercials" and "1000 Witnesses".
