= Violent Waves =

Studio album by Circa Survive
- Released: August 28, 2012
- Recorded: April 2012 at Studio 4 Recording Studios, West Conshohocken, Pennsylvania
- Genre: Progressive rock; indie rock; post-hardcore; emo
- Length: 55:17
- Label: Self-released, Sumerian (reissue)
- Producer: Circa Survive

Circa Survive chronology
Appendage (EP) (2010)	Violent Waves (2012)	Descensus (2014)

Professional ratings
Review scores
Source	Rating
AbsolutePunk	(90%)
Alter the Press!	4.5/5 stars
Alternative Press	4.5/5 stars
Blare Magazine	4/5 stars
Consequence of Sound	3.5/5 stars
Revolver	4/5 stars
Sputnikmusic	3.5/5 stars

Violent Waves is the fourth studio album by the American rock band Circa Survive. It was released on August 28, 2012. As Circa Survive wanted a record that would capture the band's live sound, where they felt the magic of the band lay, they recorded the album in one week and produced it themselves. Violent Waves is also Circa Survive's first and only album released without a record label.

The album debuted at #3 on the Top Modern Rock/Alternative Albums and #15 on the Billboard Top 200 without any label or distribution support.

Recording started on April 16, 2012, and was completed on April 24, 2012, at Studio 4 in Conshohocken, PA. Additional production by Will Yip & Vince Ratti. Engineered by Will Yip & Vince Ratti. Mixed by Vince Ratti with assistance from Will Yip.

As with Circa Survive's previous albums, Esao Andrews created the album artwork.

== Track listing ==
All tracks are written by Circa Survive.

No.	Title	Length
1.	"Birth of the Economic Hit Man"	7:12
2.	"Sharp Practice"	4:10
3.	"Suitcase (feat. Rachel Minton of Zolof the Rock and Roll Destroyer)"	4:38
4.	"The Lottery (feat. Geoff Rickly of Thursday)"	4:44
5.	"My Only Friend"	5:53
6.	"Phantasmagoria"	4:13
7.	"Think of Me When They Sound"	4:38
8.	"Brother Song"	4:45
9.	"Bird Sounds"	3:48
10.	"Blood from a Stone"	3:58
11.	"I'll Find a Way"	7:18
Total length:		55:17
