= Appendage (EP) =

EP by Circa Survive
- Released: November 30, 2010
- Recorded: August–October 2009
- Studio: Rattlebox (Toronto, Canada)
- Genre: Post-hardcore
- Length: 21:42
- Label: Atlantic
- Producer: David Bottrill; Circa Survive

Circa Survive chronology
Blue Sky Noise (2010)	Appendage (2010)	Violent Waves (2012)

Professional ratings
Review scores
Source	Rating
Alternative Press	3.5/5 stars
Muzik Dizcovery	4.5/5 stars

Appendage is the second extended play by American rock band Circa Survive. It was released on November 30, 2010, through Atlantic Records. It contains b-sides from the Blue Sky Noise sessions, as well as a demo of "Sleep Underground". As with Circa Survive's previous three albums and EP, Esao Andrews created the artwork.

== Track listing ==
_{All tracks by Circa Survive}

No.	Title	Length
1.	"Sleep Underground (Demo)"	2:26
2.	"Stare Like You'll Stay"	4:38
3.	"Everyway"	4:17
4.	"Backmask"	5:31
5.	"Lazarus"	4:50
Total length:		21:42
