= Circa Survive =

American rock band

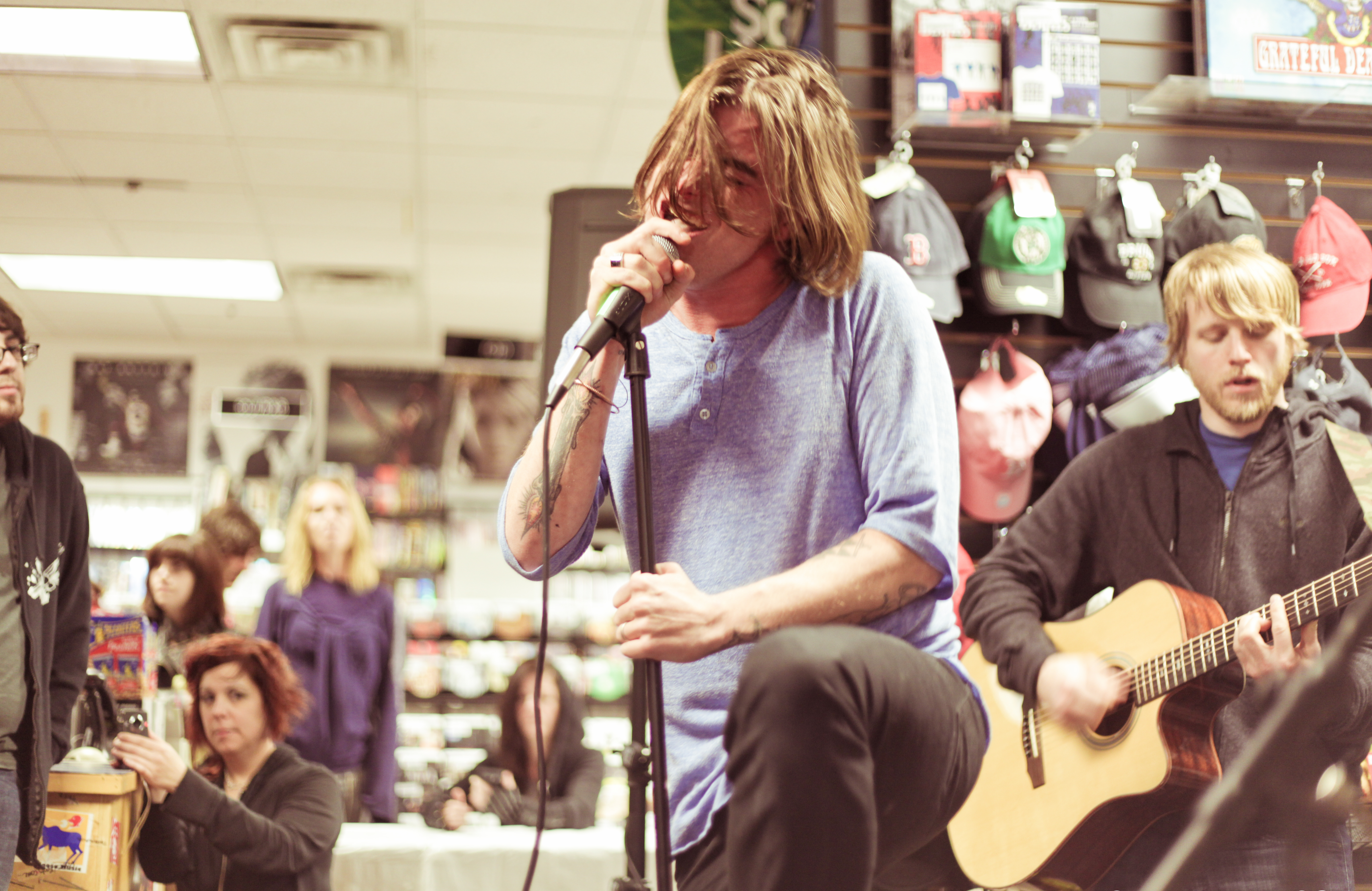
- Circa Survive in 2010

Background information
- Origin: Philadelphia, Pennsylvania, U.S.
- Genres: Alternative rock; indie rock; post-hardcore; emo; progressive rock; Midwest emo
- Years active: 2004–2022; 2026-Present
- Labels: Rise; Hopeless; Sumerian; Atlantic; Equal Vision
- Spinoffs: L.S. Dunes
- Spinoff of: Saosin; This Day Forward
- Members: Anthony Green; Colin Frangicetto; Brendan Ekstrom; Nick Beard; Steve Clifford
- Website: circasurvive.com

Circa Survive is an American rock band from Philadelphia, Pennsylvania. It was formed in 2004 by lead vocalist Anthony Green and guitarist Colin Frangicetto, joined soon after by guitarist Brendan Ekstrom, bassist Nick Beard and drummer Steve Clifford.

Green was the former lead singer of Saosin. The band's debut album Juturna was released in 2005 on Equal Vision Records, as was its follow-up On Letting Go. Their third album Blue Sky Noise was released in 2010 on Atlantic Records. For their fourth album Violent Waves in 2012, the band went independent. Their final two albums, Descensus (2014) and The Amulet (2017), were released on Sumerian and Hopeless Records, respectively. In 2022, the band released the album Two Dreams on Rise Records.

In 2022, Circa Survive announced an indefinite hiatus. Green confirmed in 2025 that it was a permanent disbandment. Following the breakup, Green became the lead vocalist of the supergroup L.S. Dunes. In February of 2026, it was announced that the band would be a part of the Louder Than Life 2026 lineup, for reunion show on the 19th of September.

== History ==
=== Formation and The Inuit Sessions (2004–2005) ===
Vocalist Anthony Green left the band Saosin in 2004, later noting "the big thing was that I was just scared. I was scared of committing". Green returned to his hometown of Philadelphia and met up with his friend Colin Frangicetto, and they decided to begin recording and recruiting. Thus, Circa Survive was born.

Frangicetto and Green, with full support from Equal Vision Records, then recruited Brendan Ekstrom. Ekstrom had been Frangicetto's bandmate in This Day Forward, which had recently disbanded. Both Ekstrom and Frangicetto had toured with Taken during their This Day Forward days, and procured Nick Beard, the previous bass guitarist of Taken, as Circa Survive's next member. The band met Stephen Clifford through Vadim Taver of the band Marigold (and also from This Day Forward); "Steve jammed with us for a week and from there it was on," said Frangicetto.

=== Juturna (2005–2006) ===
Juturna, Circa Survive's first album, was released on April 19, 2005, in the United States and on January 31, 2006, in Japan on Equal Vision Records. It had been initially announced via the band's MySpace page in November 2004. Details as to its sound remained vague, although the band stated they would keep their fans posted via their website, MySpace page, PureVolume page, and YouTube page. Shortly before its official release, the album was posted on their MySpace page in its entirety. Juturna peaked at No. 183 on the Billboard 200. The album was produced by Brian McTernan at Salad Days Studios in Baltimore.

The band drew inspiration for the album from House of Leaves and Eternal Sunshine of the Spotless Mind. During an online Q&A session on April 20, 2010, Brendan dismissed the claim that Juturna was a concept album based on Eternal Sunshine of the Spotless Mind, but did say that there is an underlying concept. That concept is speculated by fans to be vaguely about human memories. "Oh, Hello" exemplifies this with its lyrics. The decision to call the album's bonus track that appears after "Meet Me In Montauk" and the silence that follows it at 8:56, "House of Leaves" was more or less a joint one by the band and their fans. Various members of the band have stated that they have read at least some portion of the book over the years since its 2000 release.

The album's sound is characterized by its prominent utilization of effects-laden, dual guitar melodies over polyrhythmic percussion. The guitarists' approach to songwriting takes on characteristics of jazz and shoegaze music. The album has since gone on to be considered massively influential to the post-hardcore community. Members of the band have recently recognized King Crimson, Björk, Thee Silver Mt. Zion Memorial Orchestra, and Godspeed You! Black Emperor as influences on the album's sound.

=== On Letting Go (2007–2008) ===
On Letting Go is Circa Survive's second album. Released on May 29, 2007, by Equal Vision Records, the album entered the U.S. Billboard 200 at #24, selling about 24,000 copies in its first week. Up to July 11, 2007, it had sold 51,357 copies in the U.S. alone.

As with previous albums, Esao Andrews designed the artwork and Brian McTernan produced the album. The band's sound did not radically change with this release. It was still polished and refined, with guitars and drums much tighter (but still meandering when needed to) and bass more prominent. Lyrically, the band "...evokes an era when hazy lyricism and reckless introspection were prerequisites for legitimacy and timelessness."

In spring 2008, Circa Survive released an On Letting Go B-side, "1,000 Witnesses", to fans through the charity Invisible Children in an effort to raise money for the cause. In June 2008, they also released the B-side "The Most Dangerous Commercials" as a charity download to help support the relocation of local music shop Siren Records, in Doylestown, Pennsylvania.

=== Blue Sky Noise and Appendage (2008–2010) ===
After supporting Thrice and Pelican for their spring 2008 tour, Circa Survive returned to Philadelphia to write for the then-untitled third album. A short leg of shows in the Eastern U.S. occurred in late 2008 and four shows were played in Southern California in February 2009. After that, the band did not tour again until the tentatively planned headlining tour for their forthcoming third album. Anthony Green's growth as a guitarist played a major role on Blue Sky Noise, which the band framed as an entirely "new chapter".

On August 3, Circa Survive stated that they had begun recording their third album in Toronto and had chosen David Bottrill as producer. They also stated, "After completing our contract with Equal Vision we embarked on a long search to find our next home. We met with lots of labels and decided that Atlantic Records is the best place for us to continue our growth as a band and to help us release our music around the world."

Circa Survive on tour supporting Blue Sky Noise November 24, 2010

On Twitter, they stated that they would be recording 16 songs, but that they would not all be on the album. However, they said they would release them all somehow. They posted eight video updates showing some song teases. Studio recording was completed at the end of October 2009 and mixing was completed on February 1, 2010, by Rich Costey.

On February 16, 2010, they announced their new album would be titled Blue Sky Noise, and would be released on April 20, 2010. The album could be pre-purchased, and those who did so received a digital copy of the album a week early, and the first single, "Get Out", instantly. The album entered the Billboard 200 at No. 11, the band's highest position.

On October 18, 2010, Myspace Transmissions released a live EP of the band playing five tracks from Blue Sky Noise as well as a cover of the Nirvana song, "Scentless Apprentice".

Circa Survive's second EP, Appendage, was released on November 30, 2010. It contains five tracks: "Sleep Underground" (Demo), "Stare Like You'll Stay", "Everyway", "Backmask" and "Lazarus".

=== Violent Waves (2012–2014) ===
On April 16, 2012, Circa Survive began recording their fourth record, "Violent Waves". On June 25, 2012, Circa launched the Violent Waves Pre-Order webpage, officially announcing the album's title and release date, August 28, 2012, along with a new song titled "Suitcase". The band also confirmed that the album would be self-released. Green said in 2020 that Atlantic Records offered them less money to record Violent Waves because Blue Sky Noise did not meet sales expectations, so the band opted to go the independent route instead.

On March 3, 2014, it was announced via Pitchfork that Circa Survive would be releasing a 7-inch vinyl record split with the band Sunny Day Real Estate for Record Store Day 2014 (April 19). The split features "Lipton Witch" by Sunny Day Real Estate - their first new song in 14 years - and "Bad Heart" by Circa Survive, a b-side that was recorded after the release of 2012's "Violent Waves" album.

=== Descensus (2014–2016) ===
In mid April 2014, Circa Survive once again entered Studio 4 in Conshohocken, PA to record their fifth album with producer/engineer Will Yip. They recorded 11 songs during the sessions and concluded recording by the end of May. On May 19, 2014, during a Saosin interview at Skate and Surf, Anthony Green stated that Circa Survive "have a new record coming out, hopefully in the fall, I mean I fucking shouldn't even say that, probably". On April 19, 2014, the band released a split EP release with Sunny Day Real Estate titled Sunny Day Real Estate / Circa Survive Split 7".

On August 15, 2014, the band announced their signing to Sumerian Records for the release of the fifth album and also a reissue of their fourth album Violent Waves. In an Alternative Press interview published in August 2014, Green said, "Well, the next Circa record is done. We're in the final process of getting the final mixes right now." "It's definitely the most aggressive Circa record we've ever made. It's the first record of ours I've been able to listen to front to back without having that song that I'm like, 'Yeah, I could've done better here.' Every song has this moment in it that makes me feel ridiculous. I feel like I just outdid myself. I feel like we did better than we did before."

The album, entitled Descensus was released on November 24, 2014. The album art was once again made by Esao Andrews. On October 27, 2014, the band released the first single and music video from Descensus titled "Schema". The second single "Only the Sun" was shown on November 5, 2014. Its video features visuals used in the tour for the album with Title Fight, Tera Melos and Pianos Become the Teeth.

In January 2017 the band began a tour to celebrate ten years of 'On Letting Go' with support from MewithoutYou and Turnover.

=== The Amulet (2017–2021) ===
On July 10, 2017, the band announced their next LP The Amulet. Alongside the announcement they released a single titled "Lustration" with accompanying music video. The album was released on September 22, 2017, through Hopeless Records. On August 10, 2017, the band released its second music video single "Rites of Investiture". On August 30, 2017, they released their third and title track single "The Amulet". Shortly before the LP's release on September 14, 2017, the band released its final music video single "Premonition of the Hex".

The band announced a co-headlining tour with Thrice, accompanied by Balance and Composure and Chon, across North America beginning in San Jose on November 2.

In October 2018, the band released two songs called "Dark Pools" and "Indras Net" for the upcoming deluxe edition of "The Amulet" on November 2, 2018. As well as a video for the song "Flesh and Bone".

=== Two Dreams and breakup (2021–2022) ===
On June 4, 2021, the band teased a new single during the credits of the Live Sky Noise livestream. On October 8, the band would release the single as Imposter Syndrome and announced an EP coming later that month.

On October 22, 2021, the band released A Dream About Love, followed by A Dream About Death on February 4, 2022. These EPs represent a slight departure from the band's established sound, embracing a more electronic approach.

On August 30, 2022, the band announced that their members would be transitioning away from Circa Survive as their full-time job, leading to speculation on the band's future. Green would clarify on his Twitter page that the group had not disbanded. However, on October 18, 2022, the band confirmed they were taking an indefinite hiatus.

A statement from the band was shared:

Many of you have asked where things stand with us and to be totally transparent, our future is currently uncertain. For the time being, we're considering Circa on an indefinite hiatus. We want to thank you for all your love and support, especially over the last few years which were the hardest we have ever had to endure. Extra special thanks to the creatures.

On October 19, 2022, Circa Survive announced they would combine both "Dream" EPs and re-release them as the band's seventh studio album titled Two Dreams due out December 16, 2022. The album release will be accompanied by live session videos.

=== Return (2026–present) ===
In December 2025, Green admitted that the band's hiatus was actually a breakup, stemming from his relapse in 2022.

Circa Survive reformed at some point. In February 2026, the band was announced as part of the lineup for the Louder Than Life music festival in Louisville. They played their first show back from hiatus on September 15th at The Fillmore Philadelphia. In an interview with Valentino Petrarca from The Aquarian, vocalist Green said, "Circa is in better shape than it’s ever been."

== Musical style and influences ==
AllMusic categorized the band's style as "progressive hardcore", describing the band members as "veterans of the local emo and hardcore scenes looking to indulge in the rule-breaking freedom of the neo-progressive movement of the mid-2000s."

According to lead singer Anthony Green, Circa Survive have been influenced by Deftones, Thrice, Paul Simon, dredg, and Björk. Green cites Nirvana as a major influence, with Circa Survive frequently performing covers of Nirvana songs. Green stated that one of his favorite albums is Mapping an Invisible World by Days Away.

Throughout their musical career, but particularly with respect to their first album Juturna, the 2004 film Eternal Sunshine of the Spotless Mind has been a large influence on Circa Survive. The album's hidden track is based on the Mark Z. Danielewski novel House of Leaves, lending it an unofficial title. Lyrically, their third album Blue Sky Noise is based on Green's struggles with mental illness, with many of the lyrics written during his voluntary three-week stay in a mental health facility.

== Band members ==
Final members

- Anthony Green – lead vocals
- Colin Frangicetto – rhythm guitar, backing vocals
- Brendan Ekstrom – lead guitar
- Nick Beard – bass, backing vocals
- Steve Clifford – drums, percussion

Session/touring members

- Keith Goodwin – keyboards (2021–2022; 2026)

== Touring and performing ==
Circa Survive has toured on several occasions, including national tours within the United States. They toured in winter 2005 with My Chemical Romance and Thrice. That summer they co-headlined a tour. Circa Survive has also opened for Mutemath, Mae and Dredg on each of their headlining tours. Circa Survive played The Bamboozle festival in 2005, 2006, 2007, 2008 and 2011 in New Jersey. They also played a few dates on The Vans Warped Tour in 2005. In early 2006, they embarked on a tour of Europe with Coheed and Cambria and Thrice, after having previously completed a tour in September 2005 with Motion City Soundtrack. They also toured with Saves The Day, Moneen and Pistolita. In summer 2006, they embarked on their first headlining tour, The Twilight Army Tour, with The Receiving End of Sirens, Days Away, Portugal. The Man, YouInSeries and Keating. Then in fall 2006, they went on tour with Thursday, Rise Against and Billy Talent. The band also played on the Rockstar Alternative Press Tour headlining with Cute Is What We Aim For, and with supporting act As Tall As Lions.

In April 2007, Circa Survive played at the Coachella arts and music festival in Indio, California. In summer 2007, the band played the entire Vans Warped Tour alongside bands such as Coheed and Cambria, The Used, Anberlin and Bad Religion. Circa Survive opened for My Chemical Romance's 2007 shows in Worcester and Australian and New Zealand shows as well. Circa Survive opened as the main support for Thirty Seconds to Mars September 14, 2007, at the Brixton Academy. Circa Survive completed touring with Ours, Fear Before, with Dear and the Headlights and The Dear Hunter in November, 2007. On New Year's Eve 2007 they had a coming home show with Thursday and The Gaslight Anthem played at The Starland Ballroom in Sayreville, New Jersey. The band is in the Kerrang! 2008 Tour with Madina Lake, Coheed and Cambria and Fightstar. It was announced on January 24, 2008, that Circa Survive would be going on a spring 2008 tour with Thrice and Pelican.

Circa Survive has been known to incorporate other visual elements to performances. Anthony Green frequently wore dresses to outdoor music festivals, most notably The Bamboozle in 2006 and The Vans Warped Tour in 2007. The band's on Letting Go tour included a silent film projected above the band.

In 2010, after mixing for Blue Sky Noise was completed in February, Circa Survive began performing shows in the midwest United States in March, often accompanied by Good Old War and The Christmas Lights. The band performed at the annual SXSW festival in Austin, Texas, from March 18 to 24. They also performed in Anaheim at the Hoodwink Festival on March 26 and at The Bamboozle on March 27. One month later, following the release of Blue Sky Noise on April 20, Circa Survive embarked on an extended tour with Coheed and Cambria and Torche, beginning in Charlotte, North Carolina, on April 22 and ending on May 29 in Atlantic City. On June 19, 2010, Circa Survive performed at Santa Monica Beach at the Pac Sun Beach Ballyhoo event, which was shut down early due to overcrowding before the band could perform their last two songs. After an eleven-day U.S. west coast tour in late July, Circa Survive embarked on a September European tour with Middle Class Rut, beginning in Hamburg, Germany, on September 6 and ending in Nottingham, England, on September 18. Their show in London on September 15 was streamed live over the Internet and attracted more than 43,000 viewers online.

They then went on their U.S. Blue Sky Noise tour with Animals as Leaders, Dredg and Codeseven. The tour began on October 15, 2010, in Hartford, Connecticut, and concluded on December 13 in Bakersfield, California. They begin touring with Anberlin and Foxy Shazam in January 2011. On February 17, 2011, Circa Survive performed with Timeout Jimmy at the Rutgers Student Center at Rutgers University in New Brunswick, New Jersey. They also opened for Linkin Park during the A Thousand Suns Tour for their shows in Dallas and Houston, Texas.

Circa Survive toured with My Chemical Romance as their opening act along with Architects. Both bands opened for My Chemical Romance for the North American leg of The World Contamination Tour.

Circa Survive went on their Violent Waves tour, which began on September 13, 2012, in New Haven, Connecticut, and ended on October 27, 2012, in Sayreville, New Jersey. Balance and Composure, O'Brother, and Touché Amoré went along as their opening acts. They had 33 shows for this tour. After 6, they played in Atlanta, Georgia for the Nervous Energies Session. They then continued the Violent Waves tour. They had 2 Record Release shows for the new album, both in August.

In April 2013, Circa Survive toured Malaysia, Singapore and the Pulp Summer Slam XIII "Til Death Do Us Part" rock festival in Manila, Philippines, on April 27, 2013. The Manila concert featured Circa Survive along with Dragonforce, Amoral, Cannibal Corpse, Coheed and Cambria, As I Lay Dying, A Skylit Drive and 4 local Filipino bands. On April 26, 2013, Circa Survive attended a press conference with Dragonforce and Amoral to promote the Manila rock festival.

Circa Survive announced that they would be co-headlining with Minus the Bear, along with opening act Now, Now, in the "Waves Overhead" tour. This tour began March 6, 2013, and ended March 30, 2013.

On October 16, 2013, Circa Survive announced a special end-of-the-year show on Saturday, December 28, 2013, at the Shrine Expo Hall in Los Angeles. The band will be "playing an extended set of favorites from all of our albums, along with a few rarities and special guests" and will be filming the show for release in 2014. The show was released on DVD included with the Violent Waves reissue released by Sumerian Records on September 9, 2014.

On January 6, 2015, it was announced that Circa Survive would perform on Day 3 (April 12 & 19) of the Coachella Valley Music & Arts Festival in Indio, California.

On January 29, 2015, the band announced they would be touring in the Spring of 2015 with Balance and Composure again and Chon.

On October 11, 2016, the band announced their On Letting Go Ten Year Anniversary Tour with MewithoutYou and Turnover. On this tour, the band's setlist was composed of the songs from On Letting Go, in the same order as they are presented on the album, interspersed with B-sides and unreleased songs from the writing process.

== Discography ==
- Juturna (2005)
- On Letting Go (2007)
- Blue Sky Noise (2010)
- Violent Waves (2012)
- Descensus (2014)
- The Amulet (2017)
- Two Dreams (2022)

== Music videos ==
- "Act Appalled" (live montage) (2005) from Juturna
- "Act Appalled" (2006) from Juturna
- "In Fear And Faith" (live montage) (2006) from Juturna
- "The Difference Between Medicine and Poison Is in the Dose" (2007) from On Letting Go
- "Get Out" (Live Montage) (2010) from Blue Sky Noise
- "Imaginary Enemy" (2010) from Blue Sky Noise
- "Suitcase" (2012) from Violent Waves
- "Sharp Practice" (2012) from Violent Waves
- "Schema" (2014) from Descensus
- "Only the Sun" (2014) from "Descensus"
- "Child Of The Desert" (2015) from Descensus
- "Lustration" (2017) from The Amulet
- "Rites of Investiture" (2017) from The Amulet
- "The Amulet" (2017) from The Amulet
- "Premonition of the Hex" (2017) from The Amulet
- "Flesh and Bone" (2018) from The Amulet
- "Imposter Syndrome" (2021) from A Dream About Love EP
- "Electric Moose" (2022) from A Dream About Death EP

== Equipment ==
=== Guitar Rig & Signal Flow ===
- Brendan Ekstrom plays Melancon hand made guitars which are located near New Orleans U.S.A.
- A detailed gear diagram of Brendan Ekstrom's 2011 Circa Survive guitar rig is well-documented.
