= Blue Sky Noise =

Studio album by Circa Survive
- Released: April 20, 2010
- Recorded: August–October 2009
- Studio: Rattlebox, Toronto, Ontario; Metalworks, Mississauga, Ontario
- Genre: Indie rock; post-hardcore; progressive rock; emo
- Length: 49:56
- Label: Atlantic
- Producer: David Bottrill

Circa Survive chronology
On Letting Go (2007)	Blue Sky Noise (2010)	Appendage EP (2010)

Deluxe Vinyl Edition cover

Professional ratings
Aggregate scores
Source	Rating
Metacritic	83/100
Review scores
Source	Rating
AllMusic	3/5 stars
Alternative Press	4.5/5 stars
Consequence of Sound	1/5 stars
Kerrang!	4/5 stars
The Music	4.5/5 stars
Rock Sound	9/10
Spin	3.5/5 stars
Sputnikmusic	4.5/5
Tom Hull	B

Blue Sky Noise is the third studio album by American rock band Circa Survive, released on April 20, 2010 through Atlantic Records. It serves as the band's first release after departing from Equal Vision Records, and is a follow-up to their second studio album, On Letting Go (2007).

== Background ==
In August 2008, the band announced they had left Equal Vision, and were intended to use a different producer for their next album. They mentioned that their previous releases with producer Brian McTernan were "sonically [...] pretty similar. He also recorded youinseries, and skyeatsairplane for EVR." In November 2008, the band rented a place in Pennsylvania that they used to write material for their next album. In February 2009, the band performed a handful of shows in California. During the tour, a video was posted online featuring the band playing a new song, titled "Frozen Creek".

== Recording and composition ==
The band's recording sessions for the album were completed in late October 2009 and mixing was completed on February 1, 2010 by Rich Costey. Mastering was by Howie Weinberg.

This album marks a change in stylistic direction as it deviates from the band's previous blend of post-hardcore and progressive rock toward a more refined, indie rock influenced sound.

== Release ==
On February 17, 2010, Circa Survive announced that its new album would be titled Blue Sky Noise and released in two months' time. Alongside this, "Get Out" was posted online. In March 2010, the band went on a US Southern tour, which was followed by a support slot for Coheed and Cambria's cross-country US tour through to May 2010. On March 31, 2010, "Imaginary Enemy" was posted online. On April 8, 2010, a music video was released for "Get Out". A music video was released for "Imaginary Enemy" on May 14, 2010; the song was released to radio on May 25, 2010. In July and August 2010, the band went on a US tour with support from the Dear Hunter, O'Brother and Coheed and Cambria. "I Felt Free" was released to radio on October 5, 2010.

As with Circa Survive's previous two albums, the album artwork was created by Esao Andrews.

There are four other songs not included in the track list that Circa Survive has stated would be released separately from the album.

The album was ranked at No. 9 on Myspace.com's Top 50 albums of 2010.

On August 10, 2018, a remastered version (including the deluxe tracks) of the album was released.

In 2020, the band planned to have a 10-year anniversary tour for the album. However, the COVID-19 pandemic forced the band to reschedule the tour for 2022. The band eventually decided to go on hiatus.

== Track listing ==
All tracks are written by Circa Survive.

No.	Title	Length
1.	"Strange Terrain"	4:03
2.	"Get Out"	3:05
3.	"Glass Arrows"	4:12
4.	"I Felt Free"	4:00
5.	"Imaginary Enemy"	4:25
6.	"Through the Desert Alone"	4:10
7.	"Frozen Creek"	5:04
8.	"Fever Dreams"	4:35
9.	"Spirit of the Stairwell"	5:31
10.	"The Longest Mile"	4:04
11.	"Compendium"	1:49
12.	"Dyed in the Wool"	5:02
Total length:		50:00

Deluxe edition bonus tracks
No.	Title	Length
13.	"Get Out (Acoustic)"	4:05
14.	"I Felt Free (Acoustic)"	4:13
15.	"Dyed in the Wool (Acoustic)"	4:08
16.	"Every Way (Acoustic)"	3:41

ShockHound Deluxe Edition bonus track
No.	Title	Length
17.	"Airplane Dance (Demo)"	3:52

iTunes Deluxe Version bonus tracks
No.	Title	Length
13.	"I Felt Free (Acoustic)"
14.	"Dyed in the Wool (Acoustic)"
15.	"Get Out (Video)"
16.	"100 Steps (Demo)"
