= Descensus (album) =

Studio album by Circa Survive
- Released: November 24, 2014
- Genre: Progressive rock; indie rock; post-hardcore
- Length: 49:44
- Label: Sumerian
- Producer: Will Yip

Circa Survive chronology
Violent Waves (2012)	Descensus (2014)	The Amulet (2017)

Professional ratings
Review scores
Source	Rating
Alternative Press	4.5/5 stars
AbsolutePunk	7.5/10
Rock Sound	7/10
Ultimate Guitar	6.7/10

Descensus is the fifth studio album by the American rock band Circa Survive, released on November 24, 2014. Descensus is Circa Survive's first album released through Sumerian Records, aside from the Deluxe CD/DVD version of the band's previous album, Violent Waves which was released on August 28, 2012. As with Circa Survive's previous albums, Esao Andrews created the album artwork.

== Recording ==
During an interview in August 2014, Anthony Green stated that the next Circa Survive record was finished and that the band was in the final process of getting the final mixes.

== Style ==
Anthony Green on the new record: "Every song just got crazy attention put on it. We didn’t overthink things for months. We had parts worked out beforehand, but all the vocal melodies got written by me and Will over a span of eight or nine days. Some of the songs got written in the studio. The music would come in that day; a day later, there would be vocals on it, and boom—that was the meat and potatoes of a song. That’s the first time Circa have ever done that. Usually we spend months writing and demoing at the house. I would say there are only a couple songs that got sussed out musically before the [recording process]. We really went in with very little, and focused during that time we were in the studio. Will Yip’s direction and aura in the studio is unbelievable. There is an album title, but we’re not 1,000 percent on it yet; there is a tentative release date, but I can’t say what it is. It’s definitely the most aggressive Circa record we’ve ever made. It’s the first record of ours I’ve been able to listen to front to back without having that song that I’m like, 'Yeah, I could’ve done better here.' Every song has this moment in it that makes me feel ridiculous. I feel like I just outdid myself. I feel like we did better than we did before. That’s what you always hope for. I absolutely, without a doubt know that anybody who’s an actual fan of Circa Survive is gonna fuckin’ be able to jerk off to this record."

== Release ==
On October 16, 2014, Sumerian Records uploaded an album teaser video on its YouTube page, and announced that Descensus would be released on 11/24/14. Pre-order bundles were made available, and the video contained a clip of a new song. Pre-order bundles were made available through Circa Survive's official website, and could additionally be purchased at Killer Merch, Merch Connection, Merch Now, Impericon, and iTunes. Shortly afterwards on October 24, 2014, Sumerian Records uploaded another video on its YouTube page, which contained a second clip of a new song. The video also promoted the band's upcoming tour with Title Fight, Tera Melos, Pianos Become the Teeth from November 5 to December 14, 2014. The band released its first single, "Schema", on October 27, 2014. On November 4, 2014, Circa Survive released a new song titled "Only the Sun". Regarding the new single, Anthony Green stated, "“‘Only the Sun’ was the first song we tracked vocals for on Descensus, and it was our first indication that we made the right choice working with Will Yip. Once we finished the song, I think we all knew this was going to be something different and very special for us.”

== Track listing ==
All lyrics are written by Circa Survive; all music is composed by Circa Survive.

No.	Title	Length
1.	"Schema"	4:50
2.	"Child of the Desert"	4:50
3.	"Always Begin"	3:58
4.	"Who Will Lie with Me Now"	0:54
5.	"Only the Sun"	4:35
6.	"Nesting Dolls"	6:56
7.	"Quiet Down"	4:44
8.	"Phantom"	5:00
9.	"Sovereign Circle"	5:04
10.	"Descensus"	8:53
Total length:		49:44
