= Esao Andrews =

American painter

- Born: May 22, 1978; Mesa, Arizona
- Education: School of Visual Arts in New York City
- Known for: Painting
- Movement: Pop Surreal, Cartoon-Tainted Abstract Surrealism

Esao Andrews is an American painter, working with oil on wood panels. His work blends Gothic grotesque, erotic and surrealism.

== Life ==
Andrews was born and grew up in Mesa, Arizona where he attended Red Mountain High School. He designed skateboards for Baker Skateboards.

== Work ==
Andrews has exhibited in group shows; one with John John Jesse, and another with Travis Louie and Tara McPherson. He has produced cover art for all of Circa Survive's official releases.

Andrews recently had a story published in the original Fables graphic novel 1001 Nights of Snowfall. He cites Gustav Klimt, Egon Schiele, Alfons Mucha, and Joe Sorren as influences.

Andrews participated in the 2002 BP Portrait Award at the National Portrait Gallery in London.
