= Turnover discography =

- Studio albums: 5
- EPs: 4
- Singles: 10
- Music videos: 6

The discography of Turnover, an American rock band, consists of five studio albums, four extended plays, six music videos and five appearances on compilation and split albums. The band was formed in 2009 in Virginia Beach, Virginia and released their eponymous extended play two years later on Broken Rim Records. This first project has been described as emo and pop punk. In 2012, the band signed to Run for Cover Records and put out a split with Citizen. The next year, Turnover released their debut album, Magnolia, on Run for Cover Records. Magnolia reached number 15 on the Top Heatseekers chart, but failed to chart on the Billboard 200. In 2014, the band released their second extended play, Blue Dream, on Broken Rim Records.

Turnover released their second album, Peripheral Vision, on Run For Cover Records. The album sold well, reaching number 4 on the Top Heatseekers chart and number 15 on the Independent Albums chart. Peripheral Vision was a break from the band's earlier work moving in a more dream pop direction. The same year, the band released an extended play of their Audiotree session. Humblest Pleasures, a two-song extended play, was released in 2016. Eric Soucy was dismissed from the band in 2017, due to allegations of emotional abuse. The same year, Turnover's third album, Good Nature, came out. The album is Turnover's best selling record, reaching number 79 on the Billboard 200 and number 5 on the Independent Albums chart. In 2019, Altogether, Turnover's fourth album, was released. It sold worse than Good Nature and did not crack the Billboard 200, but reached number 4 on the Top Heatseekers chart and number 13 on the Independent Albums chart.

== Studio albums ==
List of studio albums, with selected chart positions
| Title | Details | Peak chart positions | | | Ref. |
| Title | Details | US | US Heat | US Indie | Ref. |
|---|---|---|---|---|---|
| Magnolia | Released: April 16, 2013; Label: Run for Cover | — | 15 | — | |
| Peripheral Vision | Released: May 4, 2015; Label: Run for Cover | — | 4 | 15 | |
| Good Nature | Released: August 25, 2017; Label: Run for Cover | 79 | — | 5 | |
| Altogether | Released: November 1, 2019; Label: Run for Cover | — | 4 | 13 | |
| Myself in the Way | Released: November 4, 2022; Label: Run for Cover | — | — | — | |
"—" denotes a recording that did not chart or was not released in that territory.

== Extended plays ==
List of extended plays by Turnover
| Title | Details | Ref. |
|---|---|---|
| Turnover | Released: 2011; Label: Broken Rim | |
| Blue Dream | Released: August 26, 2014; Label: Broken Rim | |
| Turnover on Audiotree Live | Released: August 25, 2015; Label: Audiotree | |
| Humblest Pleasures | Released: 2016; Label: Run For Cover Records | |

== Singles ==
List of singles, showing year released and album name
| Title | Year | Album | Ref. |
|---|---|---|---|
| "Waiting" (acoustic) | 2011 | Non-album single | |
| "Cutting My Fingers Off" | 2015 | Peripheral Vision | |
| "Super Natural" | 2017 | Good Nature | |
| "Sunshine Type" | 2017 | Good Nature | |
| "Bonnie (Rhythm & Melody)" | 2017 | Good Nature | |
| "Much After Feeling" | 2019 | Altogether | |
| "Plant Sugar" | 2019 | Altogether | |
| "Parties" | 2019 | Altogether | |
| "Number on the Gate" | 2019 | Altogether | |
| "Wait Too Long" | 2022 | Myself in the Way | |
| "Mountains Made of Clouds" | 2022 | Myself in the Way | |
| "Ain't Love Heavy" | 2022 | Myself in the Way | |
| "Tears of Change" | 2022 | Myself in the Way | |

== Music videos ==
List music videos that Turnover has released
| Title | Year | Album | Director | Ref. |
|---|---|---|---|---|
| "Most of the Time" | 2013 | Magnolia | Alex Henery | |
| "New Scream" | 2015 | Peripheral Vision | Rob Soucy | |
| "Humming" | 2016 | Peripheral Vision | Rob Soucy | |
| "Super Natural" | 2017 | Good Nature | Dolan Chorng | |
| "Much After Feeling" | 2019 | Altogether | Jennifer Juniper Stratford | |
| "Still in Motion" | 2019 | Altogether | Mason Mercer | |

== Appearances on compilations and splits ==
List of compilation and split albums that Turnover has appeared on
| Year | Title | Track(s) | Ref. |
|---|---|---|---|
| 2012 | Split with Citizen | "Permanent" and "No Sun" | |
| 2012 | Invisible Children Benefit | "Sasha" | |
| 2013 | Off The Board – A Studio 4 Family Compilation | "Flicker and Fade" | |
| 2014 | Split with Such Gold, Maker, and Ivy League, TX | "I Would Hate You If I Could" | |
| 2015 | Urban Outfitters x Run For Cover Records Mixtape 10 | "Cutting My Fingers Off" | |
