= Hyperview =

Hyperview may refer to:

- Hyperview (computing)
- Hyperview (album) by Title Fight 2015
- Hyperview, design software by Altair Engineering
