= Mat Kerekes =

American singer and songwriter (born 1994)

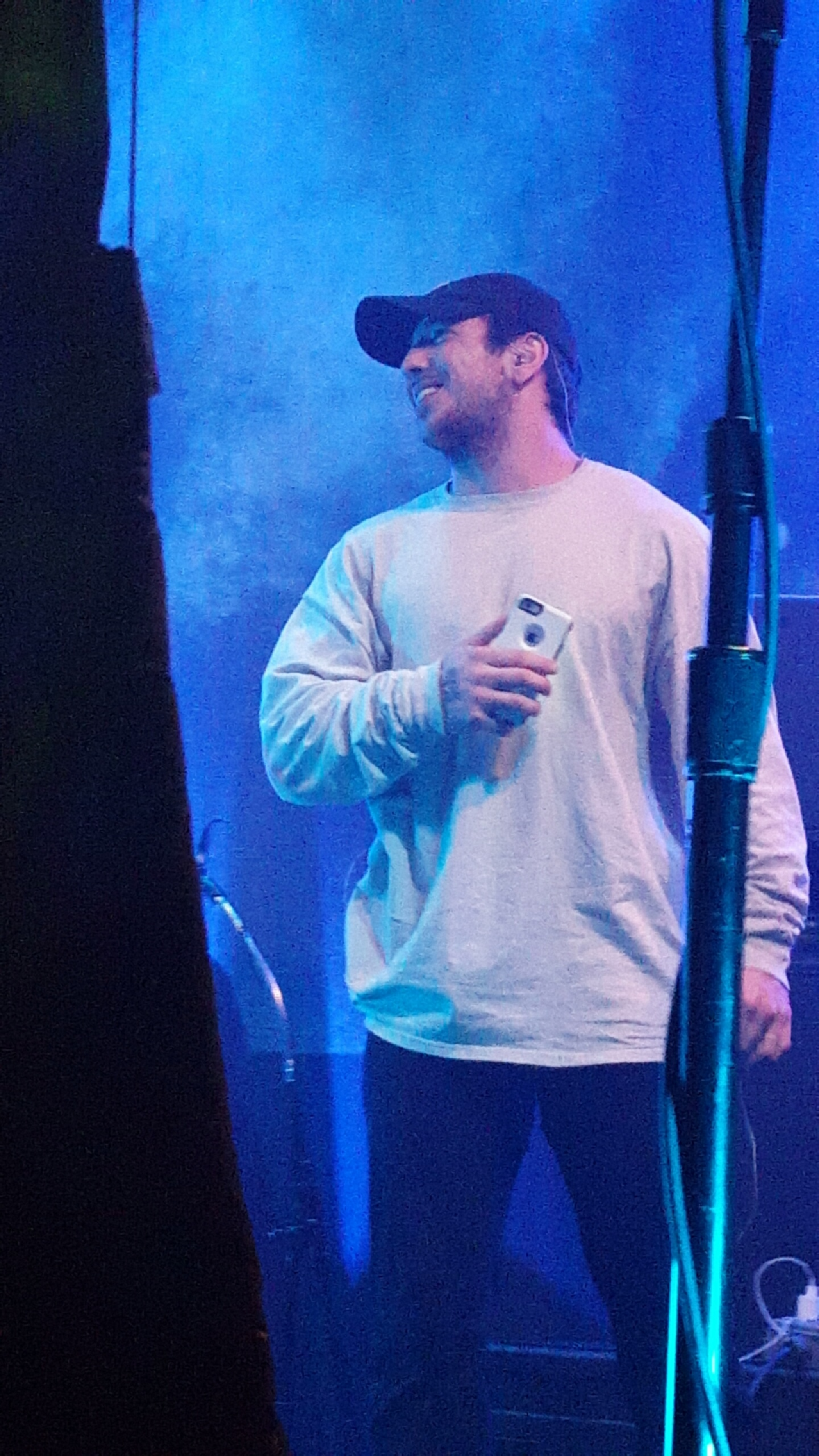
- Mat Kerekes in San Francisco with Citizen, March 2016

Background information
- Born: Mathew James Keith Kerekes; April 22, 1994 (age 32); Toledo, Ohio, United States
- Origin: Bedford Township, Michigan, United States
- Genres: Alternative rock, emo, post-hardcore, grunge
- Occupations: Musician, songwriter
- Instruments: Vocals, guitar, piano, keyboards, bass, drums, sampler
- Years active: 2009–present
- Labels: Run for Cover, EVD
- Member of: Citizen

Mat Kerekes (born April 22, 1994) is an American singer and songwriter, best known as the lead vocalist of rock band Citizen. He is also a solo artist, and a member of The Flats.

== Biography ==
Kerekes was born and grew up in the Bedford Township area of Michigan, and attended Bedford High School. Kerekes formed the band Citizen in 2009 and played their first show on January 28, 2010, at Frankie's Inner City in Toledo, Ohio, where they opened for Set Your Goals. They have released five studio albums and two EPs. Additionally, he has been an active member of his brother Chris Kerekes' band The Flats, playing drums and occasionally contributing vocals.

Kerekes has also released five solo albums and three EPs.

Kerekes has cited Third Eye Blind among his greatest musical influences.

Kerekes follows a straight edge lifestyle. He is an advocate of animal rescues and has used his music before for fundraising efforts, specifically Toledo's PET Bull Project. He owns two pit bulls.

== Discography ==
=== Solo ===
Studio albums

- Luna & The Wild Blue Everything (2016)
- Ruby (2019)
- Nova (2022)
- You Look Like a Stranger (2023)
- To Dream Of Something Wicked (2024)

EPs

- Mat Kerekes (2014)
- Amber Park (2020)
- Songs For Breanne (2020)

Compilations

- 2011–2014 (2015, Bandcamp only release)

=== with Citizen ===
- Youth (2013)
- Everybody Is Going to Heaven (2015)
- As You Please (2017)
- Life in Your Glass World (2021)
- Calling the Dogs (2023)
- Halcyon Blues (2026)

=== Appears on ===
- "Very Aggressive" – Angel Du$t (Brand New Soul, 2023)
- "Your Days Are Numbered" – Motion City Soundtrack (The Same Old Wasted Wonderful World, 2025)
- "New England Numb" – STAB (Lost In Maine, 2026)
