= Magnolia (Turnover album) =

Studio album by Turnover
- Released: April 16, 2013
- Genre: Emo; pop punk; soft grunge
- Length: 30:12
- Label: Run for Cover
- Producer: Will Yip

Turnover chronology
Citizen / Turnover (2012)	Magnolia (2013)	Peripheral Vision (2015)

Professional ratings
Review scores
Source	Rating
AbsolutePunk.net	9.0/10 stars
Alternative Press	3.5/5 stars

Magnolia is the debut studio album by American rock band Turnover.

== Release ==
On March 1, 2013, Magnolia was announced for release the following month. Alongside this, "Bloom" was made available for streaming, and the album's track listing was revealed. Following this, they embarked on a two-week tour with Diamond Youth and PJ Bond. On March 22, a music video was released for "Most of the Time", filmed by Alex Henery. In April, the group went on a two-week tour with Hostage Calm and The World Is.... Magnolia was premiered through Alternative Press' website on April 11, leading up to its release on April 16 through Run for Cover Records.

In June and July, the group embarked on a co-headlining US tour with Koji; they were supported by Ivy League and Have Mercy. Following this, they played a few shows with Such Gold and Placeholder in July and August, which was promoted with an acoustic video for "Flicker and Fade". A full-band version of "Flicker and Fade" appeared on the Will Yip compilation Off the Board, released in October. Alongside this, the group spent the month supporting Tallhart on tour. In March and April 2014, the group supported I Am the Avalanche on their headlining US tour. The band played a one-off show in the UK, appearing at Fury Fest.

== Track listing ==
No.	Title	Length
1.	"Shiver"	2:46
2.	"Most of the Time"	4:39
3.	"Wither"	3:31
4.	"Seedwong"	3:04
5.	"Pray for Me"	2:53
6.	"Bloom"	2:59
7.	"Hollow"	2:53
8.	"To the Bottom"	3:41
9.	"Like a Whisper"	2:41
10.	"Flicker and Fade"	2:21
11.	"Daydreaming"	3:37
Total length:		30:12
