= Title Fight =

American rock band

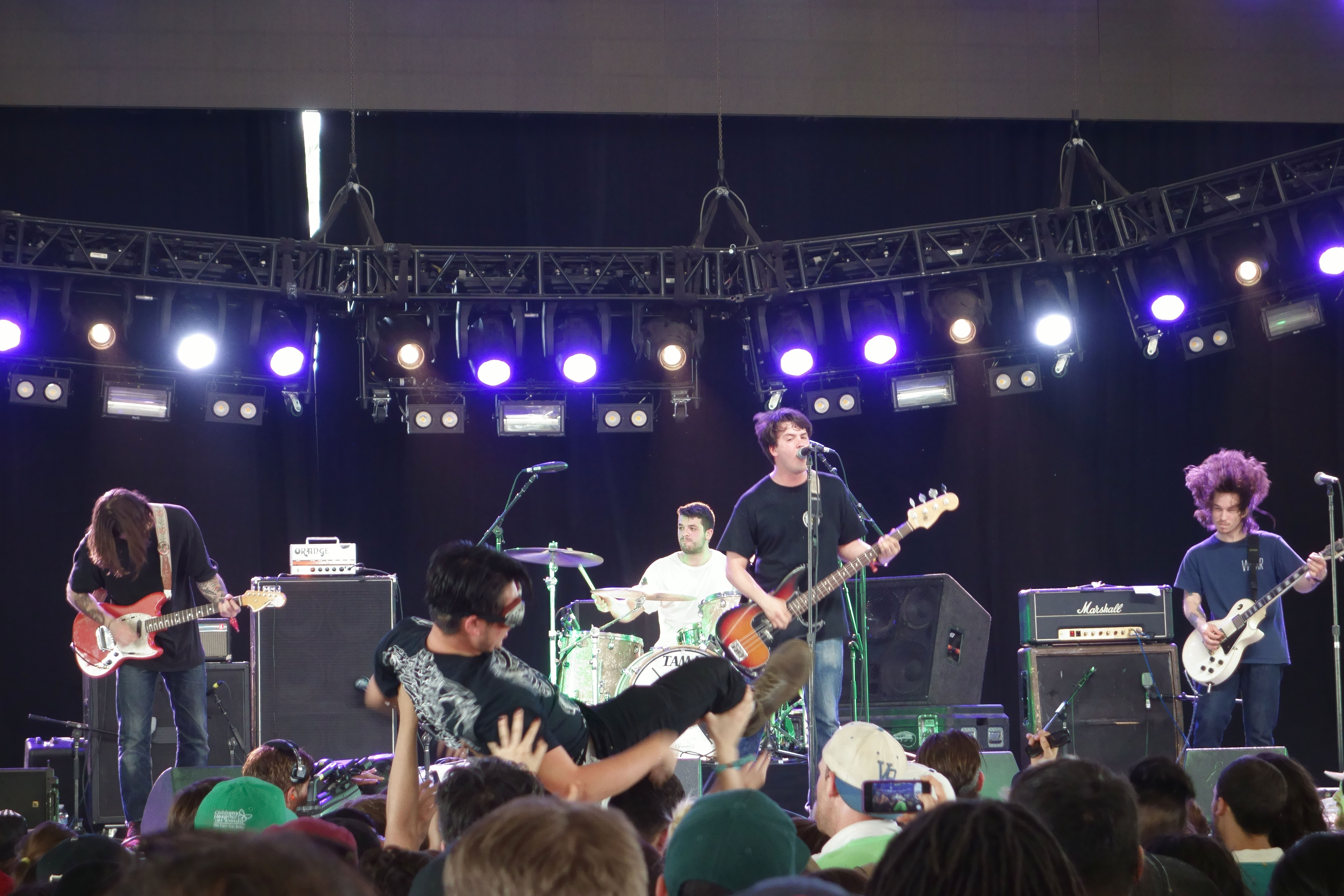
- Title Fight performing at Coachella in 2014

Background information
- Also known as: Western Haikus
- Origin: Kingston, Pennsylvania, United States
- Genres: Post-hardcore; melodic hardcore; emo; soft grunge; pop punk (early)
- Years active: 2003–2018 (on hiatus)
- Labels: ANTI-; Revelation; SideOneDummy; Run for Cover; Six Feet Under; Flightplan
- Spinoffs: Glitterer; Wrong; Bad Seed; Disengage; Early Birds
- Past members: Jamie Rhoden; Ned Russin; Shane Moran; Ben Russin
- Website: titlefight.tumblr.com

Title Fight is an American rock band from Kingston, Pennsylvania, formed in 2003. Beginning their career playing pop-punk, the band consisted of twelve year old twin brothers Ned (bass, vocals) and Ben Russin (drums), as well as Jamie Rhoden (guitar, vocals). In 2005, the band began to gain local attention, coinciding with the addition of Shane Moran (guitar), and the opening of their short-lived squat venue the Future. During this time, the band released five demos and a split EP, which culminated in the 2008 EP Kingston, which was a stylistic shift to emo-melodic hardcore.

In 2009, they signed to Run for Cover Records, who released their EP The Last Thing You Forget, which helped to establish the fourth-wave of emo. In 2011, they released their debut album Shed, which coincided with the founding of their all-ages venue the Redwood Art Space. For their second album, Floral Green (2012), they embraced the influence of alternative rock, which was a pioneering release for soft grunge music. On their final album, Hyperview (2015), they leaned further into their alternative rock influences, creating a sound more similar to shoegaze.

Title Fight's activity began to slow in 2016, playing only a small number of shows in 2017. They played their final show on January 26, 2018, soon entering an indefinite hiatus.

== History ==
=== Early years (2003–2006) ===
Brothers Ned and Ben Russin were introduced to punk rock around 1997 through their older brother, Alex Russin, who plays guitar in the New York-style hardcore band Cold World. He had gifted them records by Blink-182 and Pennywise and took them to some shows. When Alex had moved away to college, the twins were twelve years old, and began searching deeper into his record collection, introducing schoolmates to it and beginning to learn instruments, intent on forming a band.

Title Fight formed in 2003 as a three-piece band consisting of Jamie Rhoden on guitar and vocals, Ned Russin on bass, and Ben Russin on drums, playing local shows in Kingston and Wilkes-Barre, Pennsylvania. The band's name came from the cover of an old HBO Showtime guide that Ned had read in the attic when he was younger. Many of Title Fight's earliest shows were due to Alex's connections. Their first was opening for Alex's band Frost Bite at their final show, alongside Blacklisted, Drug Test and Scraps and Heartattacks. Another early show, they joined last minute after emailing influential promoter Bobb Mac, who accepted because of their connection to Alex, under the stipulation that they cover Gorilla Biscuits. Their debut demo Down for the Count was released in 2003.

Just prior to the band's formation, the Wilkes-Barre hardcore scene had included a variety of sounds including emo, metalcore and screamo. However, by the time of Title Fight's formation the scene's music had narrowed largely towards New York-style hardcore. Title Fight sought to continue the scene's more diverse history. Around 2004, many members of the established Wilkes-Barre hardcore scene moved away, with that year holding the final Positive Numbers festival, an institution of the scene. Title Fight were one of only a small number of bands remaining, which led the band to begin encouraging their schoolmates to form bands and attend shows. In Summer of 2005 while in high school, they opened their own venue "The Future", which closed soon after. A few years later, they opened another venue with local success called the "Redwood Arts Center", which closed due to pressures from the landlord and local government. At this time Title Fight began to gain attention locally and added Shane Moran on second guitar. They recorded two demos that year.

=== Kingston, The Last Thing You Forget and Shed (2007–2011) ===
They released a split with the Erection Kids in 2007 on FlightPlan Records. The band quickly followed up their first release with the Kingston 7" (also on FlightPlan Records) in February 2008. Around this time they locally played shows in a scene that Ned Russin called a "small, tight-knit community" around Kingston, featuring Scranton band Tigers Jaw, and nearby Doylestown bands Balance and Composure (who formed out of Erection Kids) and Daylight. Title Fight played with Fireworks on their tour with Set Your Goals in the summer of 2007, ultimately leading to their discovery by Jeff Casazza, the owner of Run for Cover Records; on October 16, 2008, it was announced that the band had signed to the record label. The band released a 7", The Last Thing You Forget, in December 2008 at the Getaway Group in Massachusetts with Jay Maas. It was released in June 2009 on Run for Cover Records and featured three new songs, while the CD version of the release featured all their releases to date. The artwork for the album was done by John Slaby, a friend from Wilkes-Barre. Following its release, the members dropped out of school in order to tour full time. Later in June, the band went on tour with Crime in Stereo and Fireworks, followed by a US tour with New Found Glory. In 2010, Title Fight was featured on the Triple B Records compilation America's Hardcore with a song titled "Dreamcatchers". They also toured the US with Bayside, Senses Fail, and Balance and Composure, as well as Japan with H_{2}O.

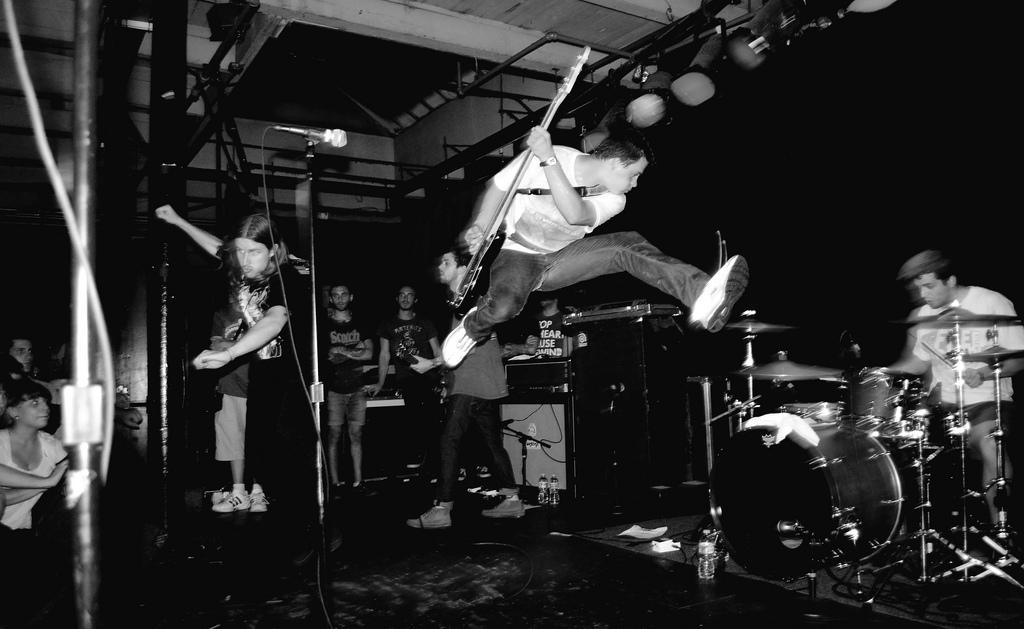
Title Fight in 2011

On January 19, 2011, Title Fight signed to SideOneDummy Records and announced they had finished recording their debut full-length album, Shed, which was produced by Walter Schreifels (of Gorilla Biscuits, Quicksand, and Rival Schools) and engineered by Will Yip at Studio 4 in Conshohocken, Pennsylvania. The band also embarked on their first headline tour in 2011 with the Menzingers, Touché Amoré, Dead End Path, and Shook Ones. Shed was released on May 3, 2011. In addition to the Shed album artwork, the album's lead single, "27", was released as a free download on February 10. On February 23, SideOneDummy Records opened preorders for a new 7" record titled "Flood of '72", the album's second single; it was released on April 12 and included an acoustic version of the song.

In July 2011, the band went on a tour of the UK and Europe. The band also played in the 2011 Reading and Leeds Festival. In October and November, the band supported Four Year Strong on the AP Fall Tour. In February 2012, the band went on a tour of Japan, titled Alliance Trax A.T. Tour, alongside Foundation, Country Yard and Inside. In April and May, the group supported Rise Against on their US tour. In between dates on this tour, the band performed a number of headlining shows. Title Fight toured Australia for the first time in September alongside Touché Amoré.

=== Floral Green and Spring Songs (2012–2014) ===
Title Fight announced via Tumblr in July 2012 that their next album, Floral Green, would come out on September 18 and its lead single "Head in the Ceiling Fan" was released as a free download. On August 14, the band premiered another song, "Sympathy", on NPR Music's All Songs Considered program. One month later, SPIN premiered a full stream of the record on their website, including an interview with Ned Russin. Upon release, Floral Green debuted at #69 on the Billboard 200.

In August of 2012, the band performed at "This Is Hardcore" festival. In September and October, the band went on a European tour with La Dispute and Make Do and Mend. A couple weeks after the tour, they hosted a record release show in Warrior Run, Pennsylvania, along with the Menzingers, Tigers Jaw, Gypsy, and Grey Zine. They then soon after headlined a US tour with supporting acts Tigers Jaw, Pianos Become the Teeth, Whirr, Young Beats, and Single Mothers. In March 2013, the band went on a tour of Australia with support from Luca Brasi. In April and May, the group went on tour of Europe and the UK with support from Dead End Path and Whirr. In August, the group appeared at FYF Fest. In September and October, the band headlined a US tour with support from Balance And Composure, Cruel Hand and Slingshot Dakota. The next month in mid November, the band performed at Fun Fun Fun Fest.

After the touring, they released the four-song EP Spring Songs on November 12, 2013 through Revelation Records, with its second track, "Be a Toy", premiering on August 12 via SPIN. The music video for the track directed by Suzy Cereijo and filmed on a Super 8 during the band's 2013 Spring European Tour – was released a few days later on the 20th.

=== Hyperview and disbandment (2014–2018) ===
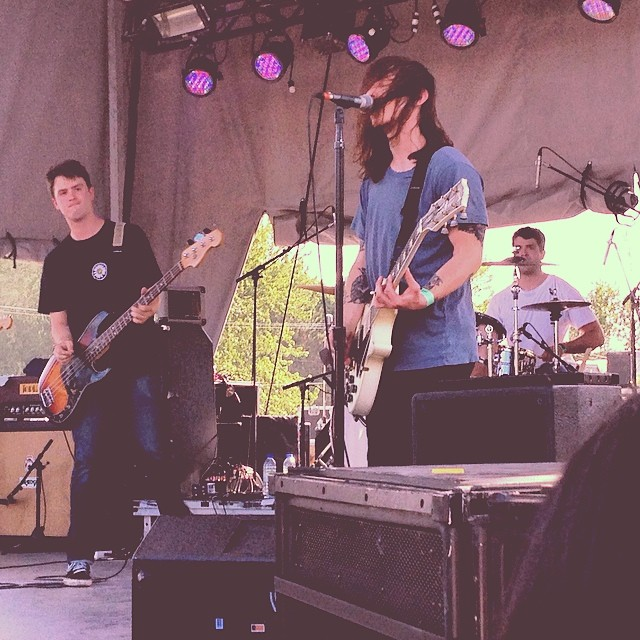
Title Fight performing live in 2014

In July 2014, the band announced on their Instagram account that they had signed to ANTI- and were in the process of recording a new album with producer Will Yip. On December 1, the band announced that their new album would be called Hyperview and was set to be released on February 3, 2015. That day, a music video for the album's lead single, "Chlorine", was released via The Fader. On release day, the band held a record release show at Gallery of Sound in Wilkes-Barre, Pennsylvania. In mid March, the band toured the U.S. with support from Merchandise and Power Trip, touring alongside La Dispute with support from the Hotelier in the second half. Next month, the band toured across Europe with support from Milk Teeth, Cold World and Drug Church, and went on a full tour of the U.S. in later that year.

Title Fight stopped touring by 2016, only playing a few select shows that year and 2017. While headlining Outbreak Festival in the UK in 2017 – in what would end up being the band's second-to-last show before going inactive – vocalist Ned Russin said, "If this is it, it’s been a wild and beautiful ride. Thank you so much. We’re Title Fight. See you on the other side." The band's final show was a benefit concert for their friend Aaron Warman, held in early 2018 at the Revolution Bar & Music Hall in Amityville, New York, with Turnstile opening.

=== Hiatus (2018–present) ===
During the hiatus, Title Fight's social media accounts occasionally post updates with information regarding merchandise and the members' other projects. In September 2023, the band announced that some members started a record label, Purple Circle, to re-press Kingston. Ned Russin also said about Title Fight's inactivity: "We've never said 'hiatus,' we've never said 'broken up,' ... 'the big breakup' is just something I do not care to be a part of, but it’s also something that doesn’t really exist anymore. There is a chance that any band will play again, no matter what."

In 2017, Ned Russin started a solo project called Glitterer, which later expanded into a full band in 2024. Ben Russin took over as the drummer for Citizen in 2023, working on their album Calling the Dogs.

In 2026, it was reported that Ned Russin, Rhoden and Moran played a short acoustic set of their older material at Ben Russin's wedding, marking their first time performing together since 2018.

== Musical style and influences ==
Title Fight's music has shifted over time. As a whole, critics have categorized the band as post-hardcore, melodic hardcore, soft grunge and emo. In the early to mid-2000s, their sound was largely pop-punk, influenced by Descendents and the local band the Snobs. By the end of the decade, they had shifted towards hardcore punk and melodic hardcore. At this foundational time in their sound, their influences included Hot Water Music, Lifetime, Seaweed, New Found Glory, Jawbreaker, Knapsack, Brand New and the Promise Ring. Their second album Floral Green was a soft grunge and emo album, citing influences including Dinosaur Jr., Nirvana, Fugazi, Sonic Youth and Sebadoh, as well as their contemporaries in Balance and Composure, Make Do and Mend and Touché Amoré. Their third album Hyperview was shoegaze, soft grunge and post-rock. For it, they continued their influence from Dinosaur Jr. in addition to citing the Beach Boys's album Pet Sounds (1966) as a major influence.

=== Legacy ===
Every once in awhile a band just comes through and changes things. I think that Title Fight was the first one that really affected everybody. At one point every band in this realm was influenced by Title Fight even if they didn’t know it.

— Mat Kerekes of Citizen, as quoted by Clash (October 19, 2017)

Title Fight were one of the most influential bands to come from hardcore punk and emo in the 2010s. They were one of the founding acts of the fourth-wave of emo, the Pennsylvania basement scene that the movement spawned from, and one of the pioneers of soft grunge music. According to BrooklynVegan writer Andrew Sacher, Title Fight's second album Floral Green (2012) was "one of the most pivotal albums of its generation not just for hardcore but for guitar-based rock and punk music in general", specifically credited them as influential upon the mainstream breakthrough hardcore experienced in the 2020s. Consequence noted them as one of the key bands in re-popularizing shoegaze for the 2020s.

They have been cited as an influence by Tigers Jaw, Polar Bear Club, Citizen, Movements, the Story So Far, Turnover, Trash Boat, Muskets, Die Spitz, Milk Teeth, Modern Color, Glare, Wisp, One Step Closer, Birdskulls, Split Chain, Ethel Cain, Lovejoy, and ZillaKami.

== Other projects ==
In the summer of 2005, they opened the squat venue the Future, where they held shows by Coalesce, Mental, Renee Heartfelt and More to Pride.

The members of Title Fight are also known for their presence in many other Wilkes-Barre hardcore bands—most notably Bad Seed, which featured Shane on vocals and Jamie on bass. Ned later joined the band on bass, while Jamie switched to guitar. Bad Seed released a demo in 2008 and a self-titled EP in 2009 on 6131 Records, and they played Sound and Fury and This Is Hardcore Fest before disbanding in 2010. In addition to Bad Seed, Shane, Ned, and Ben played in the straight-edge band Disengage, which released a seven-song EP, Look Back, in 2010; a full-length album, Expressions, in 2011; and a self-titled EP in 2014. Ned also plays in straight-edge Wilkes-Barre band Stick Together, hardcore band Big Contest, and shoegaze/indie-rock act Noise Pet. Jamie also plays in a shoegaze punk band called Haze, which released a demo of rough mixes in 2014. Ned and Ben are the younger brothers of Alex Russin, guitarist/singer of Gypsy and hardcore band Cold World.

Cafe Metropolis, the venue in Wilkes-Barre where Title Fight played their first show, closed in September 2010. To give back to the rising hardcore community, Title Fight and other local friends took action by opening the venue Redwood Art Space in the city in March 2011. They modeled it off of 924 Gilman Street, having it not serve alcohol in order to allow people below the drinking age to attend. The venue was forced into moving in June 2012.

In June 2016, Title Fight joined many other artists in donating music for a collaborative album to benefit the LGBT community after the 2016 Pulse Nightclub Shooting. The project, named "Forever Beautiful: a collection of love for Orlando", was organized by SRB Productions for the OneOrlando Fund and was released on Bandcamp on June 17th, 2016. The album included music from 49 artists, including Tiger's Jaw, Turnstile, Modern Baseball, Citizen, Basement, Superheaven, and Taking Back Sunday, some of which included unreleased music. For the album, Title Fight gave a previously unreleased B-side from Hyperview called "Dust Collector".

== Members ==
- Jamie Rhoden – guitar, vocals (2003–2018)
- Ned Russin – bass, vocals (2003–2018)
- Ben Russin – drums, percussion (2003–2018)
- Shane Moran – guitar (2005–2018)

== Discography ==
=== Studio albums ===
List of studio albums, with selected details and chart positions
Title	Details	Peak chart positions				
Title	Details	US	US Alt.	US Ind.	US Rock	AUS
Shed	Released: May 3, 2011; Label: SideOneDummy; Format: LP, CD, digital download, streaming	—	—	—	—	—
Floral Green	Released: September 18, 2012; Label: SideOneDummy; Format: LP, CD, cassette, digital download, streaming	69	—	—	—	—
Hyperview	Released: February 3, 2015; Label: Anti-; Format: LP, CD, cassette, digital download, streaming	78	6	4	10	50

=== Compilation albums ===
Title	Compilation album details
The Last Thing You Forget	Released: September 15, 2009; Label: Run for Cover; Format: CD, digital download, streaming

=== EPs ===
Title	EP details
Kingston	Released: February 2008; Label: Six Feet Under (initial release), Purple Circle (2023 re-release); Format: 7", CD, cassette, digital download
Live on WERS	Released: 2009; Label: Run for Cover; Format: Cassette
The Last Thing You Forget	Released: July 21, 2009; Label: Run for Cover; Format: 7", CD, cassette, digital download
Spring Songs	Released: November 12, 2013; Label: Revelation; Format: 7", CD, cassette, digital download, streaming

=== Demo EPs ===
Title	Demo EP details
Down for the Count	Released: 2003; Label: Self-released; Format: Digital download
Demo 2004	Released: 2004; Label: Self-released; Format: Digital download
Demo 2005 (#1)	Released: 2005; Label: Self-released; Format: Digital download
Demo 2005 (#2)	Released: 2005; Label: Self-released; Format: Digital download
Light Up The Eyes	Released: 2006; Label: Self-released; Format: Digital download

=== Split EPs ===
Title	Split EP details
Erection Kids vs. Title Fight (with The Erection Kids)	Released: 2007; Label: Flight Plan; Format: CD
Split (with Touché Amoré)	Released: April 20, 2013; Label: Sea Legs; Format: 7"

=== Singles ===
Title	Year	Album
"27"	2011	Shed
"Flood of '72"	2011	Shed
"Shed"	2011	Shed
"Missed/Dreamcatchers"	2011	non-album single
"Head in the Ceiling Fan"	2012	Floral Green
"Sympathy"	2012	Floral Green
"Secret Society"	2012	Floral Green
"Face Ghost" (Touché Amoré cover)	2013	Split
"Be a Toy"	2013	Spring Songs
"Chlorine"	2014	Hyperview
"Rose of Sharon"	2015	Hyperview
"Your Pain Is Mine Now"	2015	Hyperview

=== Compilations ===
Title	Album details	Notes
Peep Show	Released: 2006; Label: 1120 Studios	Contributed "Let Down"
America's Hardcore	Released: 2010; Label: Triple-B Records	Contributed "Dreamcatcher"
Off The Board - A Studio 4 Family Compilation	Released: October 8, 2013; Label: Memory Music	Contributed "Another One"
Forever Beautiful: a collection of love for Orlando	Released: June 17, 2016; Label: SRB Productions	Contributed "Dust Collector"

=== Music videos ===
Song	Year	Director
"Let Down"	2006	Rulio
"Symmetry"	2010	Patrick Ard
"27"	2011	Hannah Roman
"Shed"	2011	Kevin Custer
"Coxton Yard"	2011	Jerry Joint
"Head in the Ceiling Fan"	2012	Evan James
"Secret Society"	2012	Hannah Roman
"Be a Toy"	2013	Susy Cereijo
"Chlorine"	2014	Johnny Look
"Rose of Sharon"	2015	Hannah Roman
