= Life Is Not a Lesson =

Studio album by Glitterer
- Released: February 26, 2021
- Recorded: March–May 2020
- Studio: Kingston, Pennsylvania
- Genre: Indie rock; noise pop; power pop; synthpop; shoegaze; grunge; emo; post-hardcore
- Length: 21:40
- Label: ANTI-
- Producer: Ned Russin

Glitterer chronology
Looking Through the Shades (2019)	Life Is Not a Lesson (2021)	Fantasy Four (2022)

Singles from Life Is Not a Lesson
- 1. "Are You Sure?" Released: December 9, 2020; 2. "Didn't Want It" Released: January 13, 2021; 3. "Life Is Not a Lesson" Released: February 11, 2021

Life Is Not a Lesson is the second studio album by American rock musical project Glitterer, which was at the time the solo project of Ned Russin of the band Title Fight. released by Anti-. The album has received positive reviews from critics and consists of shoegaze, grunge, and hardcore punk.

== Reception ==
Dave Beech of Clash Music scored this album a 7 out of 10, calling the music, "intense, claustrophobic and often cathartic". In Kerrang!, Mischa Pearlman gave Life Is Not a Lesson a 3 out of 5, stating that the music act shows promise, but that this album needs more length and variation. Spin's Danielle Chelosky characterized this release as "uncomfortable and eccentric" as well as "a hidden opportunity to start a conversation, and to invite others to inhabit Russin's space".

== Track listing ==
No.	Title	Length
1.	"Bodies"	1:48
2.	"Are You Sure?"	1:46
3.	"Try Harder Still"	2:24
4.	"Little Backward Glance"	1:23
5.	"How a Song Should Go"	1:18
6.	"The End"	1:13
7.	"Didn't Want It"	1:59
8.	"Indeed"	1:27
9.	"Birdsong"	1:28
10.	"I Made the Call"	2:31
11.	"Fire"	2:00
12.	"Life Is Not a Lesson"	2:28
Total length:		21:40

== Personnel ==
Glitterer

- Ned Russin – instrumentation, vocals, recording, production

Additional personnel

- Susy Cereijo – photography
- Colin Gorman – drum recording, Kingston, Pennsylvania, United States
- Sarah King – vocals on "How a Song Should Go"
- Andrew Peden – artwork, layout
- Ruben Preciado – photography
- Arthur Rizk – maracas on "I Made the Call", mixing, mastering
- Ben Russin – drums, photography

== See also ==
- 2021 in American music
- List of 2021 albums
