= Floral Green =

Studio album by Title Fight
- Released: September 18, 2012
- Studio: Studio 4, Conshohocken, Pennsylvania
- Genre: Melodic hardcore; emo; post-hardcore; soft grunge
- Length: 32:47
- Label: SideOneDummy
- Producer: Will Yip

Title Fight chronology
Shed (2011)	Floral Green (2012)	Spring Songs (2013)

Singles from Floral Green
- 1. "Head in the Ceiling Fan" Released: July 24, 2012; 2. "Sympathy" Released: August 14, 2012; 3. "Secret Society" Released: September 4, 2012

Floral Green is the second studio album by American rock band Title Fight.

== Production and composition ==
It was recorded with producer Will Yip at Studio 4 in Conshohocken, Pennsylvania.

For the album, they cited influences including Dinosaur Jr., Nirvana, Fugazi, Sonic Youth and Sebadoh, as well as their contemporaries in Balance and Composure, Make Do and Mend and Touché Amoré.

The album's sound has been described as melodic hardcore, emo, post-hardcore, post-rock, soft grunge and art rock.

== Release ==
On July 8, 2012, the band posted a picture with the caption "September 2012". The following day, the group's label SideOneDummy Records posted album artwork for Floral Green. On July 24, "Head in the Ceiling Fan" was made available for streaming and as a free download via the group's website. A music video was released for "Head in the Ceiling Fan", directed by Grey Zine guitarist Evan Evans. In August, the band performed at This Is Hardcore festival. It was made available for streaming through NME on 14 September and released a few days later through SideOneDummy Records. In September and October, the band went on a European tour with La Dispute and Make Do and Mend. The band performed a celebratory release show for the album on October 19. German alternative music magazine Visions included the CD version of the album in their October 2012 issue and in its review section awarded it their album of the month.

In October and November, the group went on a headlining US tour with main support from Pianos Become the Teeth and Single Mothers. They were also supported on select dates by Tigers Jaw, Whirr, Power Trip and Face Reality. On September 4, a music video was released for "Secret Society", directed by Hannah Roman. A 7" vinyl was released featuring "Secret Society" and an untitled B-side. In March 2013, the band went on a tour of Australia with support from Luca Brasi. In April and May, the group went on tour of Europe and the UK with support from Dead End Path and Whirr. In August, the group appeared at FYF Fest. In September and October, the band went on a headlining US tour with support from Balance And Composure, Cruel Hand and Slingshot Dakota. In November, the band performed at Fun Fun Fun Fest.

== Reception ==
Professional ratings
Aggregate scores
Source	Rating
Metacritic	84/100
Review scores
Source	Rating
Alter the Press!	5/5
BBC Music	favourable
idobi	4/5
Sputnikmusic	3.5/5

It peaked at number 69 on the Billboard Top 200. The album was included in TheWaster's top albums of 2012 list, and was later named the 29th best album of the 2010s by Chorus.fm.

== Track listing ==
All tracks are written by Title Fight.

Floral Green track listing
No.	Title	Lead vocals	Length
1.	"Numb, But I Still Feel It"	Ned Russin	3:03
2.	"Leaf"	Ned Russin	2:33
3.	"Like a Ritual"	Jamie Rhoden	3:08
4.	"Secret Society"	Ned Russin	3:07
5.	"Head in the Ceiling Fan"	Jamie Rhoden	4:00
6.	"Make You Cry"	Jamie Rhoden, Ned Russin	2:54
7.	"Sympathy"	Ned Russin	2:52
8.	"Frown"	Ned Russin	2:19
9.	"Calloused"	Jamie Rhoden, Ned Russin	2:02
10.	"Lefty"	Jamie Rhoden, Ned Russin	4:01
11.	"In-Between"	Jamie Rhoden, Ned Russin	2:54

== Personnel ==
Band

- Jamie Rhoden – guitar, vocals
- Ned Russin – bass, vocals
- Shane Moran – guitar
- Ben Russin – drums

Production

- Will Yip – production, sound engineer, mixing
- Adam Ayan – mastering
- Phil Nicolo – mixing
- Jay Preston – mixing
- Colin Gorman – mixing
- Isaac Gonzales – layout
- Manny Mares – photography
- John Garrett Slaby – artwork

== Chart performance ==
Chart (2012)	Peak position
U.S. Billboard Vinyl Albums	2
