= Peripheral Vision (album) =

Studio album by Turnover
- Released: May 4, 2015
- Recorded: Fall 2014
- Studio: Studio 4 (Conshohocken, Pennsylvania)
- Genres: Indie rock; dream pop; soft grunge
- Length: 39:16
- Label: Run for Cover
- Producer: Will Yip

Turnover chronology
Magnolia (2013)	Peripheral Vision (2015)	Good Nature (2017)

Singles from Peripheral Vision
- 1. "Cutting My Fingers Off" Released: March 31, 2015

Peripheral Vision is the second studio album by American rock band Turnover. Produced by Will Yip, the album was released on May 4, 2015, by Run for Cover Records. Following the release of the band’s debut album Magnolia (2013), Turnover parted ways with original guitarist Kyle Kojan, replacing him with Eric Soucy. For Peripheral Vision, Turnover returned to producer Will Yip, who shares songwriting credits on the entire album. It was recorded at his studio, Studio 4, in Conshohocken, Pennsylvania.

The album finds the band shifting from its pop punk origins to a more atmospheric, dream pop-type sound. Peripheral Vision peaked on at number four on Billboard's Heatseekers Albums chart, and critical reviews were largely positive, focusing on its stylistic progression.

In December 2024, the band announced a short tour to celebrate the 10-year anniversary of the album, making plans to perform it in its entirety for the first time.

== Background and production ==
Turnover formed in Virginia Beach, Virginia in 2009 and released its debut album, Magnolia, in 2013. By that time, the group—composed of vocalist-guitarist Austin Getz, drummer Casey Getz, bassist Danny Dempsey, and guitarist Kyle Kojan—had been touring consistently for several years. The band’s members felt ready to move the band into a more part-time project if significant steps forward were not made in their sound and performance. Guitarist Eric Soucy joined Turnover in 2014. Danny Randon of Upset wrote that Soucy had a "major influence" on the band's composing process. In March, a four-way split EP was released featuring Turnover, Such Gold, Maker, and Ivy League, TX. Turnover's contribution was the song "I Would Hate You If I Could". Bassist Danny Dempsey considered the song the band’s "first step at walking away" from the style of their first album, Magnolia (2013).

In August 2014, it was announced that the band would be working with producer Will Yip. While working in pre-production, Yip was as thrilled with the new material as the group was. Recording took place at Yip's studio, Studio 4, in Conshohocken, Pennsylvania. Yip handled production duties and engineered the sessions, with assistance from Colin Gorman. Yip mixed the recordings with Vince Ratti, and Ryan Smith mastered the album at Sterling Sound in New York City.

== Composition ==
All of the songs that ended up on the album were credited to the band and Yip. The album's sound has been described as indie rock, pop, and dream pop. The shift in sound was unintentional according to singer-guitarist Austin Getz, who noted the band didn't plan on "mak[ing] this kind of record." Getz had been listening to "a lot of stuff from the 1980s, late ’70s." He and guitarist Eric Soucy would develop guitar parts individually "and whatever comes out comes out." The ambient droning heard throughout the album is the result of an Electro-Harmonix Superego guitar pedal. The band bought the pedal to use on its debut album but didn't "utilize it a lot", according to Dempsey. For Peripheral Vision, however, the group employed it extensively, making "everything sound a lot bigger than it really is." Discussing "Cutting My Fingers Off", Dempsey noted that it was about "things [that] will go wrong in your life and at first you'll think it's okay. [...] but then you realize it sucks." Regarding the song "Take My Head", Dempsey revealed it was "about how it could be the best day and you're surrounded by happy things, but you still want to be pissed off and sit by yourself."

== Release ==
On March 10, 2015, Peripheral Vision was announced for release. The album's artwork was also revealed. A day later, "Cutting My Fingers Off" was made available for streaming. In March and April, Turnover supported New Found Glory on its tour of the U.S. On this tour, the band was selling burned CDs of "Cutting My Fingers Off". Despite the fact the album wasn't released by this point, the band played seven songs from it. Referring to the band’s past material, Dempsey revealed that the group "didn't want to play songs we weren't stoked on." Dempsey later remarked that the tour wasn't ideal for the band. A music video was released for "New Scream" on March 30. It was directed by guitarist Eric Soucy’s brother Rob. "Cutting My Fingers Off" was released as a single a day later. On April 17, "Humming" was made available for streaming. Peripheral Vision was made available for streaming on April 29 and was released on May 4 through Run for Cover. In June and July, the band supported Fireworks on its tour of the U.S. In August, the band supported The World Is a Beautiful Place & I Am No Longer Afraid to Die and Pianos Become the Teeth.

In September and October 2015, the band supported Lydia on its tour of the U.S. In October and November, the band supported The Story So Far. In January 2016, the band toured alongside Citizen in the UK and Europe. Following this, the band tour the U.S. with Citizen again, as well as Sorority Noise and Milk Teeth in March and April. On May 16, a music video was released for "Humming", directed by Rob Soucy that features a woman walking through a desert community, which contains "a series of different people including ballerinas, mariachi bands, and other desert eccentrics", according to Noisey. Later in May, the band supported Basement on its tour of Australia and headlined the Ice Grill$ Tour in Japan. In June, the band went on a headlining east coast tour of the U.S. with support from Sports and Secret Space, and a headlining west coast tour of the U.S. in August with support from Triathlon. In early October, the band supported Moose Blood on their tour of the UK. From mid October to early November, the band went on a headlining tour of Europe with support from Sorority Noise and Milk Teeth.

== Reception ==
Professional ratings
Review scores
Source	Rating
AbsolutePunk	9/10
AllMusic	3.5/5 stars
Exclaim!	9/10
Pitchfork	6.6/10
Punknews.org	3.5/5 stars
PPCorn	4.4/5 stars
The Quinnipiac Chronicle	Favorable
Rock Sound	7/10

Peripheral Vision charted in the U.S. on several Billboard charts: number 19 on Alternative Albums, number 4 on Heatseekers Albums, number 15 on Independent Albums and number 28 on Top Rock Albums.

Critically, Peripheral Vision was well received. Exclaim!'s Branan Ranjanathan considered Peripheral Vision to be the group's "strongest and most dynamic [work] yet, masterfully incorporating new and adventurous sounds while maintaining the heartfelt authenticity that they've come to be known for." Ian Cohen of Pitchfork commended the band's shift in sound, but criticized what he found as overly obvious lyricism, writing, "Though it’s a warm and often gentle record, not much about Turnover's Peripheral Vision is subtle." Timothy Monger from Allmusic felt the opposite, praising their "improved and far more subtle songcraft." Tyler Sharp, writing for Alternative Press, commented that the band "[has] managed to progress into something entirely unique," complimenting its "subtle-yet-infectious melodies and drowsy (at times dizzying) instrumentals."

Peripheral Vision was listed on Alternative Press's "Best Albums of 2015 so far" list. It was ranked at number 3 on AbsolutePunk's top albums of 2015 list. Stereogum listed "Cutting My Fingers Off" on their "The 5 Best Songs Of The Week" list.

== Track listing ==
All songs written by Turnover and Will Yip.

1. "Cutting My Fingers Off"—3:16
2. "New Scream"—4:12
3. "Humming"—3:58
4. "Hello Euphoria"—3:46
5. "Dizzy on the Comedown"—4:15
6. "Diazepam"—3:19
7. "Like Slow Disappearing"—3:55
8. "Take My Head"—3:13
9. "Threshold"—1:28
10. "I Would Hate You If I Could"—4:03
11. "Intrapersonal"—3:46

=== 2025 bonus tracks ===
12. “Humblest Pleasures”—3:23
13. “Change Irreversible”—5:06

== Personnel ==
Personnel according to liner notes.

Turnover

- Daniel Joseph Dempsey – bass
- Austin Emanuel Getz – vocals, guitar
- Casey Charles Getz – drums
- Eric Joseph Soucy – guitar

Production

- Will Yip – producer, engineer, mixing
- Vince Ratti – mixing
- Colin Gorman – assistant engineer
- Ryan Smith – mastering
- Dane McGoldrick – layout

== Gear ==
- Signature J Mascis Squier Jazzmaster
- Roland JC-120 Jazz Chorus 120-Watt 2x12" Stereo Combo Amp
- Fulltone OCD
- TC Electronics Polytune 2
- Polara Reverberation
- Electro-Harmonix Synth Engine

== Chart positions ==
Chart (2015)	Peak position
U.S. Billboard Alternative Albums	19
U.S. Billboard Heatseekers Albums	4
U.S. Billboard Independent Albums	15
U.S. Billboard Top Rock Albums	28
