= Glitterer =

American rock band

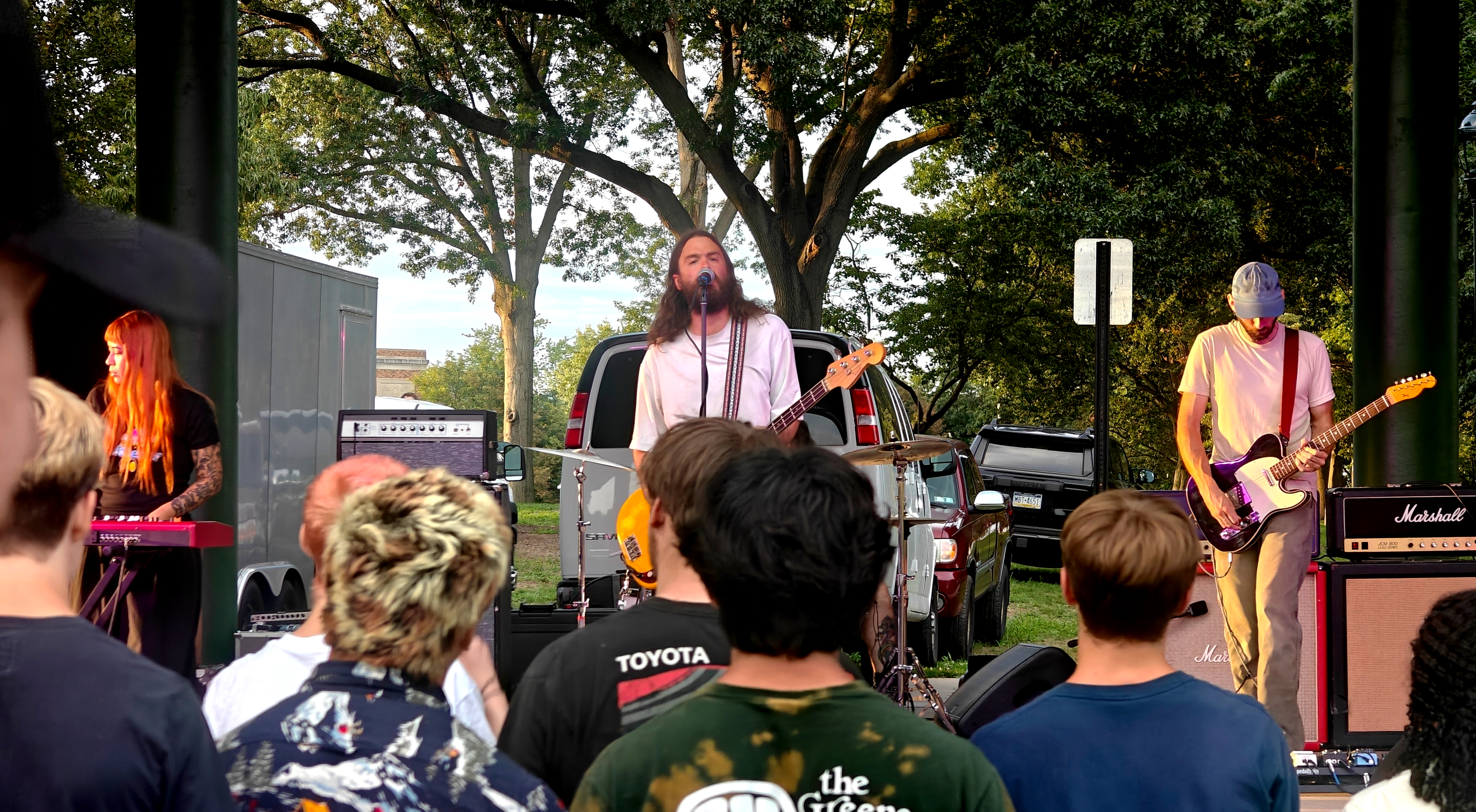
- Glitterer performing at Kirby Park, Wilkes Barre in 2026. Left to right: Nicole Dao, Ned Russin, Colin Gorman. Not pictured: Robin Zeijlon

Background information
- Origin: New York City, United States
- Genres: Indie rock; synth-pop; emo; soft grunge; shoegaze; power pop; post-punk
- Years active: 2017–present
- Labels: Purple Circle; ANTI-
- Spinoff of: Title Fight
- Members: Nicole Dao; Colin Gorman; Ned Russin; Robin Zeijlon
- Past members: Jonas Farah; Connor Morin
- Website: glitterer.com

Glitterer is an American rock band from Washington, D.C. Initially a solo project, the band was formed and is fronted by Ned Russin, vocalist and bassist of the band Title Fight.

== History ==
Glitterer released their first self-titled EP in 2017. In 2019, Russin announced his project Glitterer had signed to ANTI- Records and his first full-length album under the Glitterer moniker titled Looking Through the Shades would be released. The album was released on July 12, 2019. On February 26, 2021, Glitterer released their second full-length album, Life Is Not a Lesson. In late 2022, Glitterer released an EP titled Fantasy Four, which was inspired by the deaths of Wade Allison from the band Iron Age and Riley Gale of the band Power Trip. On February 23, 2024, Rationale, the third Glitterer album and their first as a full band, was released through ANTI- Records. On November 21, 2025, Glitterer released their fourth album, erer, through Purple Circle Records.

== Members ==
Current members

- Ned Russin – lead vocals, bass (2017–present); all instruments (2017–2021)
- Nicole Dao – keyboards (2021–present)
- Colin Gorman – guitars (2025–present)
- Robin Zeijlon – drums (2025–present)

Former members

- Connor Morin – guitars (2021–2025)
- Jonas Farah – drums (2021–2025)

Session members

- Ben Russin – drums (2019–2020)

== Discography ==
=== Studio albums ===
Title	Album details
Looking Through the Shades	Released: July 12, 2019; Label: Anti-; Format: LP, CD, digital download, streaming
Life Is Not a Lesson	Released: February 26, 2021; Label: Anti-; Format: LP, CD, digital download, streaming
Rationale	Released: February 23, 2024; Label: Anti-; Format: LP, digital download, streaming
Erer	Released: November 21, 2025; Label: Purple Circle; Format: LP, CD, digital download, streaming

=== Compilation albums ===
Title	Compilation album details
Not Glitterer	Released: 2019; Label: Purple Circle; Format: LP

=== EPs ===
Title	EP details
Glitterer	Released: August 8, 2017; Label: Self-released; Format: Digital download, streaming
Not Glitterer	Released: April 20, 2018; Label: Self-released; Format: Flexi disc, digital download, streaming
Fantasy Four	Released: September 30, 2022; Label: Anti-; Format: 7", digital download, streaming

=== Singles ===
Title	Year	Album
"Destiny"	2019	Looking Through the Shades
"1001"	2019	Looking Through the Shades
"Two"	2019	Looking Through the Shades
"Are You Sure?"	2020	Life Is Not a Lesson
"Didn't Want It"	2021	Life Is Not a Lesson
"Life Is Not a Lesson"	2021	Life Is Not a Lesson
"Plastic"	2023	Rationale
"Just a Place"	2023	Rationale
"The Same Ordinary"	2024	Rationale
"Stainless Steel"	2025	Erer
"Not Forever"	2025	Erer

=== Music videos ===
Song	Year	Director
"Destiny"	2019	Chris Tharp
"1001"	2019	Chris Tharp
"Two"	2019	Chris Tharp
"Are You Sure?"	2020	Ben Russin
"Life Is Not a Lesson"	2021	Unknown
"Plastic"	2023	Chris Tharp
"Recollection" / "No One There"	2024	Jeff Cecere
"Stainless Steel"	2025	Robin Zeijlon
