= Chlorine (Title Fight song) =

Single by Title Fight

from the album Hyperview
- Released: December 2, 2014
- Recorded: 2014
- Studio: Studio 4 Recording (Conshohocken, Pennsylvania)
- Length: 3:08
- Label: ANTI-
- Songwriters: Jamie Rhoden; Ned Russin; Shane Moran; Ben Russin
- Producer: Will Yip

"Chlorine" is a song by American rock band Title Fight released on December 2, 2014, as the first single from their third studio album Hyperview.

== Composition ==
The sound of "Chlorine" has been described as shoegaze, noted a drastic change from the hardcore punk sound apparent in Title Fight's previous records. Ian Cohen of Pitchfork wrote in a review wrote that the "queasy, violently flanged guitars and opaque vocals of "Chlorine" takes Title Fight miles beyond their Warped Tour formative years, positioning them as more of an ambient-punk analogue No Age or DIIV."

== Music video ==
A music video premiered through The Fader on December 1, 2014 a day prior to the song's official release. The video stars Mark Burnham and was directed by Johnny Look.

== Personnel ==
Lead vocals are provided by Jamie Rhoden. The track was recorded by Will Yip at Studio 4 Recording in Conshohocken, Pennsylvania.

- Jamie Rhoden – guitar, vocals
- Ned Russin – bass, theremin, vocals
- Shane Moran – guitar, synthesizer, layout
- Ben Russin – drums
