= The Last Thing You Forget =

EP / compilation album by Title Fight
- Released: 23 June 2009 (EP); 15 September 2009 (CD)
- Genre: Melodic hardcore, emo, pop-punk, hardcore punk
- Length: 6:26 (EP); 26:45 (CD)
- Label: Run for Cover

Title Fight chronology
Kingston (2008)	The Last Thing You Forget (2009)	Shed (2011)

The Last Thing You Forget is an EP and compilation album by American rock band Title Fight. Originally released as a three-song EP on 7-inch vinyl in June 2009, the September CD reissue also includes two of Title Fight's prior EPs (their 2007 split with The Erection Kids and 2008's Kingston) and a previously unreleased track, "Western Haikus".

== Track listing ==
All tracks are written by Title Fight.

EP
No.	Title	Lead vocals	Length
1.	"Symmetry"	Jamie Rhoden, Ned Russin	2:13
2.	"Introvert"	Ned Russin	2:02
3.	"No One Stays at the Top Forever"	Jamie Rhoden, Ned Russin	2:11
Total length:			6:26

CD compilation tracks
No.	Title	Lead vocals	Length
4.	"Memorial Field"	Jamie Rhoden	2:14
5.	"Loud and Clear"	Jamie Rhoden, Ned Russin	3:06
6.	"Youreyeah"	Ned Russin	2:10
7.	"Room 200"	Jamie Rhoden, Ned Russin	0:57
8.	"Evander"	Jamie Rhoden, Ned Russin	1:57
9.	"Anaconda Sniper"	Jamie Rhoden, Ned Russin	2:40
10.	"Goldwaite"	Ned Russin	2:48
11.	"Neck Deep"	Jamie Rhoden, Ned Russin	2:26
12.	"Western Haikus"	Ned Russin	2:01
Total length:			26:45

=== Notes ===
- For several years following the album's release, the titles of "Evander" and "Anaconda Sniper" were mistakenly switched on digital streaming platforms. As of July 2023, this has been corrected.
- On the original 7-inch release, there is a hidden, instrumental track on the B-side titled, “Lucky”.
- Tracks 4–6 were originally released on their 2008 release 'Kingston'.
- Tracks 7–11 were originally released on a 2007 split with The Erection Kids.
- Track 12 previously unreleased.

== Personnel ==
- Jamie Rhoden – vocals, guitar
- Shane Moran – guitar
- Ben Russin – drums
- Ned Russin – bass, vocals

Technical personnel

- Joe Loftus – engineer
- Jay Maas – engineer
- Mastering by Bill Wickham and Jay Maas
