= Youth (Citizen album) =

Studio album by Citizen
- Released: June 11, 2013
- Genre: Emo; grunge
- Length: 30:46
- Label: Run for Cover
- Producer: Will Yip

Citizen chronology
Young States (2011)	Youth (2013)	Everybody Is Going to Heaven (2015)

Professional ratings
Aggregate scores
Source	Rating
Metacritic	65/100
Review scores
Source	Rating
AllMusic	3/5 stars
Dead Press!	9/10 stars
idobi	3.5/5
Ox-Fanzine	8/10 stars
Punknews.org	4.5/5 stars
Rock Sound	8/10
XS Noize	7/10

Youth is the debut studio album by American rock band Citizen, released June 11, 2013 on Run for Cover Records.

== Background and production ==
Citizen formed in 2009 with members located in Michigan and Ohio. The group released a handful of singles and an EP, Young States (2011). In March 2012, it was announced the band signed to Run for Cover.

Citizen entered Studio 4 with producer Will Yip (Title Fight, Circa Survive, Braid), in February 2013, to record their debut album, Youth.

== Composition ==
Youth has been described predominantly as emo and grunge, but has also variably been labeled indie rock, punk rock, pop punk and post-hardcore. It drew comparisons to Brand New, Basement, the Story So Far, Transit, Title Fight and Daylight. Lyrically, the release discusses the themes of coming-of-age and adolescent angst. The opening track "Roam the Room" starts with a hard rock guitar part that recalled Brand New; it overall was reminiscent of Jar (2013)-era Daylight. The track saw frontman Mat Kerekes switch from gentle singing to more abrasive vocals, backed by intense guitar work. "Sleep" was called a mix of Seahaven and Manchester Orchestra; it talks about having sleepless nights. "Sleep" and following track "How Does It Feel" were a combination of emo and grunge. "The Night I Drove Alone" begins slowly and eventually builds to a crescendo. "Your Head Got Misplaced" was compared to R.E.M.; "Sick and Impatient" was an alternative rock track in the vein of Placebo that bordered on pop rock.

== Release ==
In March and April 2013, the group supported The Story So Far and Man Overboard on their co-headlining US tour, dubbed The Suppy Nation Tour. On April 22, Youth was announced for release, revealing its artwork. On May 13, "The Summer" was made available for streaming. In addition, the album's track listing was revealed. On May 20, a video of behind-the-scenes footage during recording was posted online. On May 29, "Roam the Room" was released as a free download via Alternative Press. Due to Youth leaking, the group made the album available for download on June 4 for $5. It was formally released on June 11 through Run for Cover. On the same day, a music video was released for "The Summer".

Youth received a UK release on July 14. Following this, the group embarked on a UK tour with Diamond Youth and Headroom. In October, the group performed at The Fest. In November and December, the band went on tour with Polar Bear Club, Diamond Youth and Sainthood Reps. On December 4, a music video was released for "How Does It Feel", directed by Rob Soucy. In March and April 2014, the group supported The Wonder Years on their North American headlining tour. The following month, the group appeared at Skate and Surf festival. In September and October, the band went on a headlining US tour with support from You Blew It!, Hostage Calm, Praise and True Love. The tour included an appearance at Riot Fest. On October 6, a music video was released for "Figure You Out". Directed by Ryan Mackfall, it was filmed during their UK tour.

== Track listing ==
No.	Title	Length
1.	"Roam the Room"	2:59
2.	"Figure You Out"	2:34
3.	"The Summer"	3:01
4.	"Sleep"	3:09
5.	"How Does It Feel"	3:53
6.	"The Night I Drove Alone"	2:13
7.	"Speaking with a Ghost"	3:22
8.	"Your Head Got Misplaced"	2:12
9.	"Sick and Impatient"	3:41
10.	"Drawn Out"	3:37
Total length:		30:46
