= Light We Made =

Studio album by Balance and Composure
- Released: October 7, 2016
- Genre: Alternative rock; emo; post-punk; electronic rock; shoegaze
- Length: 41:03
- Label: Vagrant, Big Scary Monsters (Europe)
- Producer: Will Yip

Balance and Composure chronology
The Things We Think We're Missing (2013)	Light We Made (2016)	With You in Spirit (2024)

Singles from Light We Made
- 1. "Postcard" Released: July 25, 2016; 2. "Afterparty" Released: August 25, 2016

Professional ratings
Aggregate scores
Source	Rating
Metacritic	64/100
Review scores
Source	Rating
Alternative Press	3.5/5 stars
Exclaim!	7/10
Kerrang!	3/5 stars
New Noise	4/5 stars
Pitchfork	6.8/10
PopMatters	5/10 stars
Punknews.org	3.5/5 stars
Rock Sound	7/10
Sputnikmusic	2.5/5

Light We Made is the third studio album from American rock band Balance and Composure. It was released on October 7, 2016 through Vagrant Records and Big Scary Monsters throughout Europe. It is the band's last album with original drummer Bailey Van Ellis, and also their last before disbanding in 2019 and reuniting in 2023.

== Track listing ==
No.	Title	Length
1.	"Midnight Zone"	4:10
2.	"Spinning"	4:00
3.	"Afterparty"	3:43
4.	"For a Walk"	2:55
5.	"Mediocre Love"	4:29
6.	"Postcard"	4:31
7.	"Call It Losing Touch"	3:52
8.	"Fame"	4:34
9.	"Is It So Much to Adore?"	4:12
10.	"Loam"	4:37
Total length:		41:03

== Charting ==
Chart (2014)	Peak position
US Billboard 200	137
US Top Alternative Albums (Billboard)	15
US Independent Albums (Billboard)	19
US Top Rock Albums (Billboard)	24
US Indie Store Album Sales (Billboard)	24
US Vinyl Albums (Billboard)	7
