= Shed (album) =

Studio album by Title Fight
- Released: May 3, 2011
- Genres: Punk rock; emo; melodic hardcore; hardcore punk; post-hardcore
- Length: 27:17
- Label: SideOneDummy
- Producer: Walter Schreifels

Title Fight chronology
The Last Thing You Forget (2009)	Shed (2011)	Floral Green (2012)

Singles from Shed
- 1. "27" Released: February 10, 2011; 2. "Flood of '72" Released: March 1, 2011; 3. "Shed" Released: April 26, 2011

Professional ratings
Aggregate scores
Source	Rating
Metacritic	81/100
Review scores
Source	Rating
AbsolutePunk	8/10
AllMusic	3/5 stars
Alter the Press!	3/5 stars
Exclaim!	Favorable
NME	8/10
Punknews.org	4/5 stars
Rock Sound	8/10
The Waster	Favorable

Shed is the debut studio album by American rock band Title Fight. It was released on May 3, 2011, through SideOneDummy Records. It received positive reviews, garnering an 81 on review aggregator Metacritic. It debuted at No. 8 on the Billboard Heatseekers chart.

== Background ==
Compilation album The Last Thing You Forget was released in 2009. Bassist/vocalist Ned Russin said that since its release, the band members had "dropped out of school, seen the world and had life experiences".

== Release ==
On January 20, 2011, it was announced that Title Fight had signed to independent label SideOneDummy Records, and would be releasing their debut album in the spring. On February 10, Shed was announced for release in May, revealing its track listing. In addition, the band gave away "27" as a free download on their Tumblr profile. Russin said that it would be "the first time we have a recording that's longer than seven minutes, so this is a long time coming". On April 27, the album's title-track was made available as a free download. Shed was made available for streaming on May 2, before being released the following day. On May 4, a music video was released for "27". In May and June, the band embarked on their first headlining US tour with support from Touché Amoré, The Menzingers, Dead End Path and Shook Ones.

In July 2011, the band went on a tour of the UK and Europe. On October 10, a music video was released for "Shed". In October and November, the band supported Four Year Strong on the AP Fall Tour. On November 21, a 7" vinyl was released featuring the outtakes "Missed" and "Dreamcatchers". On the same day, the group released a music video for "Coxton Yard". In February 2012, the band went on a tour of Japan, titled Alliance Trax A.T. Tour, alongside Foundation, Country Yard and Inside. In April and May, the group supported Rise Against on their US tour. In between dates on this tour, the band performed a number of headlining shows.

Despite not being released as a single, the song "Safe in Your Skin" had a surge in popularity in 2022 and 2023, mainly due to TikTok virality. It is now the band's most streamed song on Spotify, with 118 million streams as of November 2025.

== Track listing ==
All tracks are written by Title Fight.

Shed track listing
No.	Title	Lead vocals	Length
1.	"Coxton Yard"	Jamie Rhoden, Ned Russin	1:30
2.	"Shed"	Ned Russin	2:17
3.	"Flood of '72"	Jamie Rhoden, Ned Russin	1:57
4.	"Society"	Ned Russin	1:23
5.	"You Can't Say Kingston Doesn't Love You"	Jamie Rhoden	1:43
6.	"Crescent-Shaped Depression"	Jamie Rhoden, Ned Russin	2:35
7.	"Safe in Your Skin"	Walter Schreifels	2:50
8.	"Where Am I?"	Jamie Rhoden, Ned Russin	3:06
9.	"Your Screen Door"	Jamie Rhoden	2:09
10.	"27"	Ned Russin	2:28
11.	"Stab"	Jamie Rhoden	2:01
12.	"GMT (Greenwich Mean Time)"	Ned Russin	3:38
Total length:			27:17

== Personnel ==
Band

- Jamie Rhoden – guitars, vocals
- Ned Russin – bass, vocals
- Shane Moran – guitars
- Ben Russin – drums

Production

- Walter Schreifels – production, vocals on "Safe In Your Skin"
- Will Yip – sound engineer, mixing
- Kim Rosen – mastering
- Dirk Fritz – layout
- Manny Mares – photography
- Alex Dow – photography
- Nathan Congleton – photography
- John Garrett Slaby – artwork
