= Hyperview (album) =

Studio album by Title Fight
- Released: February 3, 2015
- Recorded: July–August 2014
- Studio: Studio 4 Recording
- Genres: Shoegaze; soft grunge; indie rock; dream pop
- Length: 31:47
- Label: ANTI-
- Producer: Will Yip

Title Fight chronology
Spring Songs (2013)	Hyperview (2015)

Singles from Hyperview
- 1. "Chlorine" Released: December 2, 2014; 2. "Rose of Sharon" Released: January 13, 2015; 3. "Your Pain Is Mine Now" Released: January 19, 2015

Hyperview is the third and final studio album by American rock band Title Fight, released on February 3, 2015, by ANTI- Records. The album was produced by Will Yip at Studio 4 Recording, marking the third time Title Fight has worked with Yip, following Floral Green (2012) and the Spring Songs EP (2013). It was mastered by Emily Lazar and Richard Morales at The Lodge, in New York.

Hyperview produced the singles "Chlorine", "Rose of Sharon", and "Your Pain Is Mine Now". The album marked a change in the band's style from the energetic hardcore punk of previous records to a fuzzier and more textured sound rooted in shoegaze and indie rock. It would also be the last recording released by Title Fight before they would go on hiatus in mid-2018. It would go on to receive positive reviews from critics who praised their growth and stylistic shift.

== Background and production ==
In 2012, Title Fight released their second album, Floral Green, and followed it up with the 2013 EP, Spring Songs. On July 24, 2014 it was announced that Title Fight had signed to ANTI-. The band said that their "ability to choose our own path regardless of current or past status quos is a defining characteristic" of the band. With signing to ANTI-, they said that "these qualities will be strengthened and supported."

Title Fight's previous efforts were compared to the likes of Gorilla Biscuits and Lifetime. For Hyperview, bassist Ned Russin said the group was "looking at bands like maybe Dinosaur Jr. and the Beach Boys — we were looking at the moment where they found something that had never been done before and was now being done well. We were just chasing that energy." Hints of the Hyperview sound could be heard in their previous work. Russin claimed that the album was "the most melodic, simple stuff" the band have created. According to the band, the title Hyperview, "is a state of increased vision, of acute awareness. One in which foresight is even sharper than hindsight." "Chlorine" was "a culmination of all attributes, but not limited to any particular one."

== Release ==
On December 1, Hyperview was announced for release, with the artwork and track listing being revealed. It was announced while the band were part-way through a tour with Circa Survive and Pianos Become the Teeth. On the same day, a music video was released for "Chlorine" via The FADER. It was directed by Jonny Look. "Chlorine" was released as a single a day later. On January 12, 2015 a music video was released for "Rose of Sharon", it was directed by Hannah Roman. The video features a young person watching films on his television, interspersed with footage of the band. A day later, the song was released as a single.

"Your Pain Is Mine Now" was made available for streaming via Vogue on January 19. On January 27, the album was made available for streaming. Hyperview was released on February 3 through ANTI-. (Note: U.S. ANTI- 87383) The band held a record release show at Gallery of Sound in Wilkes-Barre, Pennsylvania. In mid March, the band toured the U.S. with support from Merchandise and Power Trip. In late March and early April, the band toured alongside La Dispute with support from The Hotelier. In May, the band toured across Europe with support from Milk Teeth, Cold World and Drug Church. The band went on a tour of the U.S. in October and November.

== Composition ==
The album's sound has been described as dream pop, soft grunge, indie rock and post-punk. The Guardian compared it to Shudder to Think and Slowdive.

One frequent categorization of the album was as shoegaze. However, this has been disputed. In a 2025 retrospective article, former Revolver editor Eli Enis stated "Hyperview was dubbed a shoegaze record mostly by people who didn't know what shoegaze was beyond Nothing, Whirr, Pity Sex, and Deafheaven.", noting it as too thin, quiet and clean. As a part of this article, producer Will Yip recalled that the band did not want to make shoegaze. Instead, Yip credited its similarities to shoegaze as coming from mixing the vocals quietly and adding chorus and fuzz during post-production.

== Reception ==
Professional ratings
Aggregate scores
Source	Rating
Metacritic	71/100
Review scores
Source	Rating
The 405	7/10
AbsolutePunk	6.8/10
AllMusic	4/5 stars
Consequence of Sound	B−
DIY	3/5 stars
Exclaim!	8/10
NME	8/10
Pitchfork	7.6/10
Punknews.org	3/5 stars
Spin	7/10

Compared to previous albums, Title Fight's third effort was not as well received by critics. Some cite the reason for the more mixed reviews was due to the evolution of their sound from a punk and hardcore based noise, to a more distorted, shoegaze-influenced sound. Nevertheless, Hyperview received generally positive reviews overall from professional critics. Album aggregator, Metacritic, gave the album 71/100 indicating "generally favorable reviews".

In a positive review for Exclaim!, Branan Ranjanathan wrote that "the heavily distorted, fuzzy wall of sound from previous albums has been replaced by lead guitar jangle here, but while that may seem off-putting to fans who are accustomed to the relentless punk bludgeoning of their previous material, at its core the songwriting is solid, and familiar enough for old fans to learn to love." Zoe Camp of Pitchfork also gave the album a positive review, praising the songwriting of the band.

The album was included on Grantland's "10 Great Albums From 2015 (So Far) You Might Have Missed" and "Pop-Punk Is the New Indie Rock (or Perhaps the Old Alt Rock)" lists. "Chlorine" was included on Grantland's "Songs of the Week" list.

== Track listing ==
All tracks are written by Title Fight.

Hyperview track listing
No.	Title	Lead vocals	Length
1.	"Murder Your Memory"	Jamie Rhoden	2:36
2.	"Chlorine"	Jamie Rhoden	3:08
3.	"Hypernight"	Ned Russin	2:56
4.	"Mrahc"	Jamie Rhoden	2:11
5.	"Your Pain Is Mine Now"	Jamie Rhoden	4:03
6.	"Rose of Sharon"	Ned Russin	2:50
7.	"Trace Me Onto You"	Jamie Rhoden, Ned Russin	4:02
8.	"Liar's Love"	Ned Russin	3:26
9.	"Dizzy"	Jamie Rhoden	4:21
10.	"New Vision"	Jamie Rhoden	2:14
Total length:			31:47

== Personnel ==
Title Fight

- Jamie Rhoden – guitar, vocals
- Ned Russin – bass, theremin, vocals
- Shane Moran – guitar, synthesizer, layout
- Ben Russin – drums

Production

- Will Yip – producer, composer, engineer, mixing
- Susy Cerejo – photography
- Brianna Collins – layout
- Emily Lazar – mastering
- Rich Morales – mastering assistant
- Todd Pollock – photography
- Jay Preston – studio assistant
- Vince Ratti – mixing
- John Garrett Slaby – cover photo

== Charts ==
Chart (2015)	Peak position
Australian Albums Chart	50
U.S. Billboard 200	78
U.S. Billboard Alternative Albums	6
U.S. Billboard Independent Albums	4
U.S. Billboard Top Rock Albums	10
U.S. Billboard Tastemaker Albums	5
U.S. Billboard Top Album Sales	41
U.S. Billboard Vinyl Albums	2
