= Spring Songs (EP) =

EP by Title Fight
- Released: November 12, 2013
- Genre: Indie rock, punk rock, emo
- Length: 12:17
- Label: Revelation
- Producer: Will Yip

Title Fight chronology
Floral Green (2012)	Spring Songs (2013)	Hyperview (2015)

Singles from Spring Songs
- 1. "Be a Toy" Released: August 12, 2013

Professional ratings
Review scores
Source	Rating
Alternative Press	3/5 stars
Pitchfork	7.2/10
Punknews.org	3/5 stars
Vice	Unfavorable

Spring Songs is an EP by American rock band Title Fight, released on November 12, 2013 through Revelation Records. The EP's second track "Be a Toy" was premiered on August 12 through SPIN magazine, with a music video following on November 20, directed by Susy Cereijo.

== Track listing ==
All tracks are written by Title Fight.

Spring Songs track listing
No.	Title	Lead vocals	Length
1.	"Blush"	Ned Russin	2:52
2.	"Be a Toy"	Jamie Rhoden, Ned Russin	3:04
3.	"Receiving Line"	Ned Russin	3:53
4.	"Hypnotize"	Jamie Rhoden, Ned Russin	2:25
Total length:			12:17

== Personnel ==
- Jamie Rhoden - guitar, vocals
- Ned Russin - bass, vocals
- Shane Moran - guitar
- Ben Russin - drums
