= With You in Spirit =

Studio album by Balance and Composure
- Released: October 4, 2024
- Genre: Alternative rock; indie rock
- Length: 37:45
- Label: Memory Music
- Producer: Will Yip

Balance and Composure chronology
Light We Made (2016)	With You in Spirit (2024)

Singles from With You in Spirit
- 1. "Cross to Bear" Released: May 29, 2024; 2. "Sorrow Machine" Released: May 29, 2024; 3. "Believe the Hype" Released: July 16, 2024; 4. "Any Means" Released: August 20, 2024; 5. "With You in Spirit" Released: September 23, 2024

With You in Spirit (stylized in all lowercase) is the fourth studio album from American rock band Balance and Composure. Their first studio album since reuniting in 2023, it was released on October 4, 2024, through Memory Music. The eight-year gap between it and Light We Made marks the longest gap in the band's studio albums to date. It is also the band's first studio album with drummer Dennis Wilson, who had joined the band on their final tour before their initial disbandment in 2019.

Five singles were released ahead of the album: "Cross to Bear", "Sorrow Machine", "Believe the Hype", "Any Means", and the title track, each with a music video.

== Track listing ==
All lyrics are written by Jonathan Simmons; all music is composed by Matthew Warner, Dennis Wilson, Erik Petersen, Andy Slaymaker, Simmons, and Will Yip; additional writing on "Any Means" by Joey Vannucchi.

With You in Spirit track listing
No.	Title	Length
1.	"Restless"	1:49
2.	"Ain't It Sweet"	2:57
3.	"Any Means"	3:37
4.	"Cross to Bear"	4:32
5.	"Believe the Hype"	3:35
6.	"Lead Foot"	3:25
7.	"Sorrow Machine"	4:45
8.	"A Little of Myself"	3:33
9.	"Closer to God"	4:52
10.	"With You in Spirit"	4:40
Total length:		37:45

== Personnel ==
Balance and Composure

- Erik Petersen – guitar
- Jon Simmons – vocals, guitar, cover photo
- Andy Slaymaker – guitar
- Matt Warner – bass guitar
- Dennis Wilson – drums

Additional contributors

- Will Yip – production, mixing, engineering, vinyl mastering, additional percussion, keyboards, programming
- Ryan Smith – digital mastering
- Vince Ratti – co-mixing
- Justin Bartlett – engineering assistance
- Anneliese Parenti – engineering assistance
- Josh Fernandez – engineering assistance
- Dylan Savopoulos – layout
- Mike Paulshock – live photo
