= Balance and Composure =

American emo band

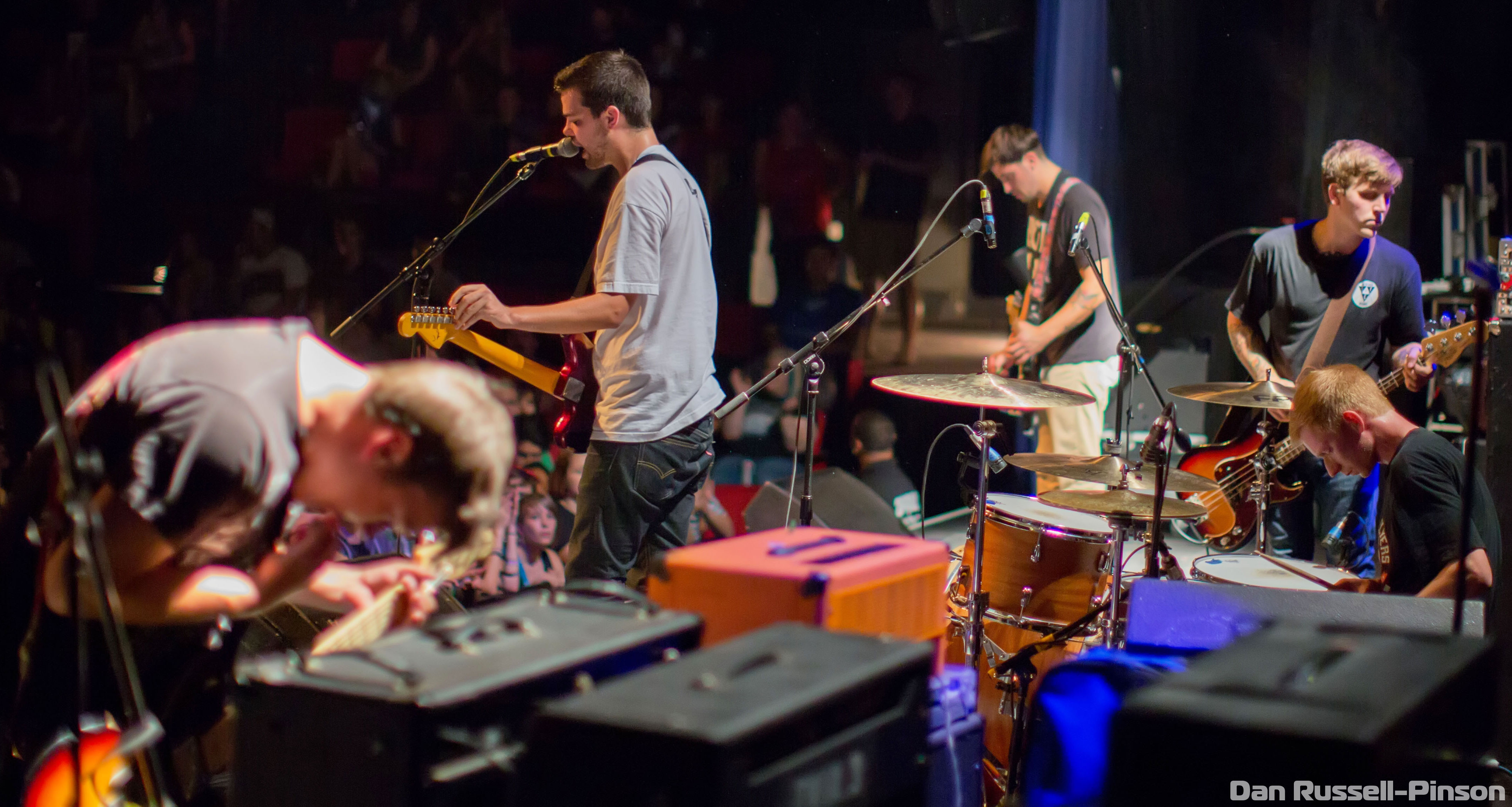
- Balance and Composure playing at Center Stage in Atlanta, Georgia, in 2012

Background information
- Origin: Doylestown, Pennsylvania, U.S.
- Genres: Emo; post-hardcore; alternative rock; post-grunge; soft grunge
- Years active: 2007–2019; 2023–present
- Labels: Vagrant; UNFD (AU/NZ); No Sleep; Big Scary Monsters (EU); Memory Music
- Members: Jon Simmons; Andy Slaymaker; Erik Petersen; Matt Warner; Dennis Wilson
- Past members: Bailey Van Ellis

Balance and Composure is an American emo band from Doylestown, Pennsylvania. The band was formed in 2007 by vocalist and guitarist Jon Simmons, drummer Bailey Van Ellis, guitarist and vocalist Andy Slaymaker and bassist Matt Warner, following the disbandments of their previous bands Erection Kids and Sceneic. One of the founding acts of the fourth-wave of emo and a pioneer of soft grunge music, they released two EPs and a split album with Tigers Jaw, before releasing their debut album, Separation, in 2011, by which time they also added guitarist Erik Petersen. In 2013, they released their second album, The Things We Think We're Missing, followed by 2016's Light We Made. In 2019, Van Ellis departed from the band, replaced by Dennis Wilson, who took part in their final tour before disbanding. In 2023, they reformed with the lineup from their then-final tour, releasing their fourth album, With You in Spirit, in 2024.

== History ==
=== Origins run (2007–2016) ===
Balance and Composure formed in the fall of 2007, following the disbandments of Erection Kids and Scenic State, they soon recorded a three song demo. Their founding lineup was vocalist and guitarist Jon Simmons, drummer Bailey Van Ellis, guitarist and vocalist Andy Slaymaker and bassist Matt Warner. They quickly helped to establish the Pennsylvania fourth-wave emo scene, alongside Doylestown's Daylight, Kingston band Title Fight and Scranton band Tigers Jaw. They released their debut EP, I Just Want to Be Pure, in July 2008. In June 2008, toured the US with Bayside, Senses Fail, and Title Fight. In 2009, they released their second EP, Only Boundaries, through No Sleep Records. Around this time, Erik Petersen joined as a third guitarist. In 2010, they released a split album with Tigers Jaw.

Balance and Composure released their debut album, Separation, in 2011. In August 2012, they toured Australia, with support from Phantoms and Cavalcade. Their second album, The Things We Think We're Missing, was released on September 9, 2013, and reached number 51 on the Billboard 200, number 10 on the Independent Albums, number 13 on the Modern Rock/Alternative Albums and number 16 on the Rock Albums charts. In September and October 2013, the band went on a US tour, supporting Title Fight, alongside Cruel Hand and Slingshot Dakota. On October 7, 2016, they released their third album, Light We Made.

=== Final tour and disbandment (2017–2023) ===
On December 14, 2017, on Taylor Madison's Strange Nerve podcast, vocalist Jon Simmons announced that their upcoming anniversary tour would be their last. On January 14, 2019 a press release went out on the band's Twitter account announcing a farewell tour. Six dates were confirmed, saying that "These shows are the only shows we have planned in our future, we would love if you joined us one last time." The band later added extra dates due to high demand. These shows had select support from Tigers Jaw, mewithoutYou, and Touché Amoré. Before these dates took place, Van Ellis departed from the band, his role being filled by Dennis Wilson, formerly of Saves the Day and Every Avenue.

Following the disbandment, Simmons focused on his emo rap duo Cowards, with Wicca Phase Springs Eternal, as well as his emo rap collective Misery Club with WPSE, Nedarb, Lil Zubin, Fantasy Camp and FoxWedding.

=== Reunion and With You in Spirit (2023–present) ===
On April 11, 2023, the band reunited and surprise released the 7-inch single Too Quick to Forgive with two new songs, "Savior Mode" and "Last to Know". The release was produced by longtime collaborator Will Yip and released via his label, Memory Music. The band also announced a handful of reunion shows with select support from Webbed Wing, Grist Mil, Fleshwater, Seahaven, Death Bells, Choir Boy, and Toledo. Simmons, Andy Slaymaker (guitar), Erik Petersen (guitar), Matt Warner (bass), and Wilson (drums) returned in the formation of the 2023 iteration of the band. The band released their fourth studio album (and first in eight years), With You in Spirit, on October 4, 2024, via Memory Music. Between 27 May and 7 July 2025, they supported Turnover on their U.S. tour.

== Musical style and legacy ==
Critics have categorized Balance and Composure's music as alternative rock, post-hardcore, emo, post-grunge and soft grunge.

On their early material, they played a 1990s style of emo, similar to Sunny Day Real Estate or Texas is the Reason, while incorporating elements of alternative rock and indie rock. At this time, their influences included Hot Water Music, Neutral Milk Hotel, Sunny Day Real Estate, Nirvana, the Smiths, Explosions in the Sky, Built To Spill, Red House Painters, American Football, Mineral, Texas is the Reason, Johnny Cash, the Cure, Jimmy Eat World, the Pixies, mewithoutYou, Manchester Orchestra, Jawbreaker and Braid. By Light We Made (2016), they had begun to incoroproate broader influences such as trip-hop and industrial music, which Pitchfork writer Ian Cohen termed "nü-bubble grunge", or a uniquely 2010s take upon alternative rock. Later on their career they have cited influence from Porches, Travis Scott, Isaiah Rashad, Radiohead and Warpaint.

Balance and Composure were one of the founding acts of the fourth-wave of emo, and one of the pioneers of soft grunge music. A 2016 Pitchfork article by Ian Cohen, called them a part of "the new vanguard of old school alt-rock".

They have been cited as an influence by Title Fight, Polar Bear Club, Movements, Turnover, Currents and Split Chain.

== Members ==
Current members

- Jon Simmons – lead vocals (2007–2019, 2023–present), rhythm guitar (2010–2019, 2023–present), lead guitar (2007–2010)
- Andy Slaymaker – rhythm guitar, backing vocals (2007–2019, 2023–present)
- Matt Warner – bass (2007–2019, 2023–present)
- Erik Petersen – lead guitar (2010–2019, 2023–present)
- Dennis Wilson – drums, programming (2019, 2023–present)

Former members

- Bailey Van Ellis – drums, programming (2007–2019)

Timeline

== Discography ==
Studio albums

- Separation (2011)
- The Things We Think We're Missing (2013)
- Light We Made (2016)
- With You in Spirit (2024)

EPs

- I Just Want to Be Pure (2008)
- Only Boundaries (2009)
- Balance and Composure/Tigers Jaw split (2010)
- Acoustic 7" (2012)
- Braid & Balance and Composure split (2012)
- Off the Board: A Studio 4 Family Compilation (2013)
- Postcard/Revelation 7" (2016)
- Slow Heart 7" (2017)
- Too Quick to Forgive 7" (2023)

Music videos

Year	Song	Director
2012	"Quake"	Dan Centrone
2013	"Reflection"	Dan Centrone
2013	"Tiny Raindrop"	Alex Henery
2016	"Postcard"	Jason Michael Roberts
2016	"Afterparty"	Jason Michael Roberts
2023	"Savior Mode"	Jon Simmons, Erik Petersen, Britain Weyant
2023	"Last to Know"	Dessie Jackson
2024	"Cross to Bear"	Drew Horen
2024	"Sorrow Machine"	Dessie Jackson
2024	"Believe the Hype"	Drew Horen
2024	"Any Means"	Britain Weyant
2024	"With You in Spirit"	Dessie Jackson
