= Prying Eyes =

Studio album by Cruel Hand
- Released: October 14, 2008
- Recorded: July 2008
- Genre: Hardcore punk
- Length: 23:07
- Label: Bridge 9

Cruel Hand chronology
Without a Pulse (2007)	Prying Eyes (2008)	Lock & Key (2010)

Professional ratings
Review scores
Source	Rating
AllMusic	3.5/5 stars

Prying Eyes is the second studio album by Portland, Maine hardcore punk band Cruel Hand. It was released in 2008 on Bridge 9 Records.

== Critical reception ==
Exclaim! called the album "a terrific stab at first-gen hardcore featuring echoing bass, shifts between menacing mid-tempos and testosterone-fueled blasts of furiousness, and a slightly updated feel thanks to crisp production and more guttural vocals accented by backgrounds."

== Track listing ==
No.	Title	Length
1.	"Above and Below"	1:44
2.	"Dead Weight"	1:42
3.	"Life in Shambles"	1:44
4.	"Begin Descension"	2:24
5.	"Motions That Lie"	2:17
6.	"Hounds"	2:42
7.	"Damaged Goods"	1:29
8.	"Heart Failure"	1:28
9.	"No Known Graves"	2:27
10.	"Prying Eyes"	1:09
11.	"House Arrest"	1:41
12.	"Wisdom Pain"	2:23
