= Everybody Is Going to Heaven =

Studio album by Citizen
- Released: June 23, 2015
- Recorded: January 2015
- Studio: Studio 4 Recording
- Genres: Alternative rock; emo; shoegaze
- Length: 39:57
- Label: Run for Cover
- Producer: Will Yip

Citizen chronology
Youth (2013)	Everybody Is Going to Heaven (2015)	As You Please (2017)

Everybody Is Going to Heaven is the second studio album by American rock band Citizen. The album charted within the top 20 on various Billboard charts.

== Background ==
The group announced they were in the process of recording their next album on January 5, 2015. Everybody Is Going to Heaven was recorded at Studio 4 Recording in Conshohocken, Pennsylvania, with producer Will Yip. He was assisted by engineer Colin Gorman; Yip and Vince Ratti mixed the recordings. Ryan Smith mastered the album at Sterling Sound in New York City.

Discussing the writing process, guitarist Nick Hamm said the group was "doing whatever we feel like" and that the songs were "twice as big as [the tracks on] Youth. It's Citizen, but it's turned up to 11". Everybody Is Going to Heaven has been described as alternative rock, emo, and shoegazing.

== Release ==
On April 26, 2015, Everybody Is Going to Heaven was announced for release in June, revealing its cover art. In addition, a short snippet of a song was available on the group's website. On May 5, "Cement" was made available for streaming via Noisey. On June 3, a music video was released for "Stain". The video, directed by Max Moore, premiered via Vice. Everybody Is Going to Heaven was made available for streaming on June 9 via Spin, before being released on June 23 through Run for Cover Records. On October 21, a music video was released for "Yellow Love". Directed by Moore, it features two people stabbing themselves with knives. According to Noisey, proceeding this is "a strange reaction that plays out for the rest of the duration. One could expound that it's a visual representation of the song's lyrics seen real".

In October and November, the group supported Circa Survive on their headlining US tour. In January 2016, the group went on a tour of Europe and the UK with Turnover. "Numb Yourself" was released as a radio single on February 19. In March and April, the group went on a US tour alongside Turnover, Sorority Noise and Milk Teeth. On May 8, an outtake, titled "Nail in Your Hand", was released for free download from the group's website. In August, the group appeared at Reading Festival in the UK. In November, the group went on a tour of Japan and Australia.

== Track listing ==
Track listing per sleeve.

1. "Cement" – 3:42
2. "Dive into My Sun" – 4:20
3. "Numb Yourself" – 3:25
4. "Heaviside" – 3:49
5. "My Favorite Color" – 3:43
6. "Weave Me (Into Yr Sin)" – 4:35
7. "Stain" – 3:41
8. "Ten" – 3:26
9. "Yellow Love" – 3:41
10. "Ring of Chain" – 5:35

Japanese bonus track

11. "Nail in Your Hand" – 3:11

== Personnel ==
Personnel per sleeve.

Citizen

- Eric Hamm – bass
- Jake Duhaime – drums
- Mat Kerekes – vocals
- Nick Hamm – guitar
- Ryland Oehlers – guitar

Additional musicians

- Dean Tartaglia – saxophone (track 9)
- Shelly Weiss – violin (track 10), viola (track 10)
- Ill Will – auxiliary percussion

Production and design

- Will Yip – producer, engineer, mixing
- Colin Gorman – assistant engineer
- Vince Ratti – mixing
- Ryan Smith – mastering

== Charts ==
Chart (2015)	Peak position
US Billboard 200	132
US Top Album Sales (Billboard)	54
US Top Alternative Albums (Billboard)	14
US Independent Albums (Billboard)	3
US Heatseekers Albums (Billboard)	1
US Top Rock Albums (Billboard)	16
US Vinyl Albums (Billboard)	2
