= Rationale (Glitterer album) =

Studio album by Glitterer
- Released: February 23, 2024
- Recorded: May 22–27, 2023
- Studio: Philadelphia, Pennsylvania, US
- Genre: Indie rock; emo; grunge; pop punk; power pop; synthpop; shoegaze
- Length: 21:26
- Label: Anti-
- Producer: Arthur Rizk

Glitterer chronology
Fantasy Four (2022)	Rationale (2024)	Erer (2025)

Singles from Rationale
- 1. "Plastic" Released: October 25, 2023; 2. "Just a Place" Released: November 29, 2023; 3. "The Same Ordinary" Released: January 23, 2024

Rationale is the third studio album by the American rock band Glitterer. It was released on February 23, 2024, through Anti-. It is Glitterer's first album as a full band, after expanding from Ned Russin's solo project.

== Critical reception ==
Andrew Sacher of BrooklynVegan included this among the notable releases of the week, calling it "a loud, punk-informed rock record" that shows the band geling as a unit rather than a solo project for vocalist Ned Russin. In Dork, Ciaran Picker rated this album 4 out of 5 stars, calling it "a reworking of previous material, making it more refined, defined, and consistent" with post-punk and electronica sounds. Kevin Wilson of Glide Magazine stated that there are bedroom pop influences in this music that is "unfamiliar territory that suits the band perfectly". Kerrang!'s Rachel Roberts rated Rationale a 3 out of 5, summing up that "there are little twinkles of innovative magic in the corners of this album, and they would make it feel more worthwhile if brought to the forefront more often". Editors at Stereogum chosen this to be Album of the Week, with critic Danielle Chelosky ending her review, "It's probably not far-off to assume the title Rationale is satirical, a sort of jab at himself for bothering to look for logic in a world founded on inexplicability. It is a funny task to assign yourself, but the results are the answers themselves—we exist to have fun if only for a little while, which is exactly what these songs accomplish."

A June 3 roundup of the best albums of the year in Spin included Rationale where Jonah Bayer called it "so timeless that it sounds like it could have been made in 1994 or 2024". The following day, Stereogum published a similar overview and placed it as the 43rd best album of the year so far, with Danielle Chelosky praising "sagacious lyricism... at its peak... wrapped up in colorful guitars and fluttering synthesizers".

== Track listing ==
No.	Title	Length
1.	"I Want to Be Invisible"	2:17
2.	"The Same Ordinary"	1:11
3.	"Plastic"	1:24
4.	"Can't Feel Anything"	2:40
5.	"Big Winner"	0:58
6.	"Recollection"	1:30
7.	"Certainty"	1:57
8.	"It's My Turn"	1:21
9.	"Just a Place"	2:15
10.	"No One There"	1:48
11.	"My Lonely Lightning"	1:16
12.	"Half Truth"	2:53
Total length:		21:26

== Personnel ==
Glitterer

- Nicole Dao – keyboard
- Jonas Farah – drums
- Connor Morin – guitar
- Ned Russin – bass guitar, vocals

Additional personnel

- Owen Lehman – photography
- Andrew Peden – artwork, layout
- Arthur Rizk – production
- Ben Russin – photography
- Alex Wharton – mastering at Abbey Road Studios

== See also ==
- 2024 in American music
- List of 2024 albums
