= Life in Your Glass World =

2021 Citizen album

Studio album by Citizen
- Released: March 26, 2021
- Recorded: 2019–2020
- Genre: Emo; experimental rock; indie rock
- Length: 37:40
- Label: Run for Cover
- Producer: Mat Kerekes

Citizen chronology
As You Please (2017)	Life in Your Glass World (2021)	Calling the Dogs (2023)

Singles from Life in Your Glass World
- 1. "I Want to Kill You" Released: January 12, 2021; 2. "Blue Sunday" Released: February 9, 2021; 3. "Black and Red" Released: March 9, 2021

Life in Your Glass World is the fourth studio album by American rock band Citizen. The album was released on March 26, 2021 through Run for Cover Records.

== Style and composition ==
The album has been described by music journalists as emo, experimental rock, and indie rock.

== Critical reception ==
Professional ratings
Aggregate scores
Source	Rating
Metacritic	72/100
Review scores
Source	Rating
Classic Rock	3.5/5 stars
DIY	3.5/5 stars
Distorted Sound	7/10
Kerrang	3/5 stars
The Line of Best Fit	9/10
Upset	4/5 stars

Life in Your Glass World received generally positive reviews from contemporary music critics. On review aggregator website, Metacritic, the album has average rating of 72 out of 100 indicating "generally favorable reviews".

Joe Smith, writing for The Line of Best Fit, described the album as a "a brave and rewarding return from emo experimentalists Citizen". Smith further said "each track holds its own distinct mood, along with the signature poised aggression that they've meticulously sculpted throughout their career". Smith awarded the album a 9 out of 10. Phoebe De Angelis, writing for Upset Magazine gave the album a four-star rating out of five saying that Life in Your Glass World is Citizen's "most confident body of work to date."

In a mixed review, Joe Richardson, writing for Kerrang! gave Life in Your Glass World a three-star rating out of five. Richardson described the album as a "consistently rewarding listen", but conceded that the album "doesn't exactly shatter expectations".

== Track listing ==
All music is composed by Mat Kerekes, Nick Hamm, and Eric Hamm.

Life in Your Glass World track listing
No.	Title	Length
1.	"Death Dance Approximately"	4:07
2.	"I Want to Kill You"	3:11
3.	"Blue Sunday"	3:52
4.	"Thin Air"	3:02
5.	"Call Your Bluff"	3:25
6.	"Pedestal"	3:12
7.	"Fight Beat"	2:53
8.	"Black and Red"	2:52
9.	"Glass World"	3:25
10.	"Winter Buds"	4:08
11.	"Edge of the World"	3:27
Total length:		37:40
