= The Things We Think We're Missing =

Studio album by Balance and Composure
- Released: September 9, 2013
- Recorded: January–June 2013
- Genres: Alternative rock, post-hardcore, emo
- Length: 48:06
- Label: No Sleep

Balance and Composure chronology
Separation (2011)	The Things We Think We're Missing (2013)	Light We Made (2016)

Professional ratings
Aggregate scores
Source	Rating
Metacritic	78/100
Review scores
Source	Rating
Alter The Press	4.5/5 stars
Alternative Press	4.5/5 stars
Kerrang!	3/5 stars
Pitchfork	(6.6/10)
Rock Sound	4.5/5 stars

The Things We Think We're Missing is the second studio album by American band Balance and Composure, released on September 9, 2013.

== Track listing ==
All music is composed by Balance and Composure.

No.	Title	Length
1.	"Parachutes"	3:27
2.	"Lost Your Name"	3:45
3.	"Back of Your Head"	4:14
4.	"Tiny Raindrop"	3:34
5.	"Notice Me"	3:11
6.	"Ella"	1:29
7.	"Cut Me Open"	5:33
8.	"Reflection"	4:08
9.	"I'm Swimming"	4:21
10.	"When I Come Undone"	3:49
11.	"Dirty Head"	2:51
12.	"Keepsake"	3:51
13.	"Enemy"	4:33
Total length:		48:06

== Chart positions ==
Chart (2014)	Peak position
US Billboard 200	51
US Top Alternative Albums (Billboard)	13
US Independent Albums (Billboard)	10
US Top Rock Albums (Billboard)	16
