= Hyperview (computing) =

A hyperview in computing is a hypertextual view of the content of a database or set of data on a group of activities. As with a hyperdiagram multiple views are linked to form a hyperview.
