= Altogether (Turnover album) =

Studio album by Turnover
- Released: November 1, 2019
- Recorded: Spring and Summer 2019
- Studio: Studio 4, Conshohocken, Pennsylvania
- Genre: Indie rock; dream pop
- Length: 39:16
- Label: Run for Cover
- Producer: Will Yip

Turnover chronology
| Good Nature (2017) | Altogether (2019) | Myself in the Way (2022) |

Singles from Altogether
- 1. "Still In Motion"; 2. "Much After Feeling"; 3. "Parties"

Altogether is the fourth studio album by Turnover. The album was written by Turnover and producer Will Yip and recorded at Studio 4 Recording in Pennsylvania; it was mastered by Ryan Smith at Sterling Sound NYC with artwork and photograph collaboration by JJ Stratford / Telefantasy Studios. The album was released on November 1, 2019, through Run for Cover Records. On November 6, a music video was released for "Still in Motion", directed by Mason Mercer.

Despite the proximity of the band's hometown (Virginia Beach, Virginia) to the studio where they recorded this album (Conshohocken, Pennsylvania), this is the first album the band wrote while they were living on opposite coasts. This ended up defining the concept of the album which they consider their most collaborative and connected work to date.

== Reception ==
Professional ratings
Aggregate scores
| Source | Rating |
|---|---|
| Metacritic | 58/100 |
Review scores
| Source | Rating |
| AllMusic | 3/5 stars |
| DIY | 4.5/5 |
| Exclaim! | 4/10 |
| Pitchfork | 5.4/10 |
| The Skinny | 3/5 stars |

Multiple media sources in the music industry have expressed their criticism towards Altogether. Pitchfork stated that the record was "unrecognizable" as it evolved from the sounds of the previous three studio albums, and that "in Turnover’s attempts to keep things uncomplicated and accessible, they sound anonymous and corny".

Everything Is Noise, another recognizable music media source, describes the album with a dream pop aesthetic with some light 1980s influence. In alignment with Pitchfork and people's reviews about this album headed into a more pop direction, Everything Is Noise agreed that the album is very relatable as the lyrics are conversational.

== Track listing ==
All songs written by Turnover and Will Yip.

1. "Still in Motion" - 3:46
2. "Much After Feeling" – 3:36
3. "Parties" – 3:47
4. "Number on the Gate" – 4:08
5. "Sending Me Right Back" – 3:35
6. "Ceramic Sky" – 1:52
7. "Valley of the Moon" – 4:46
8. "No Reply" – 3:21
9. "Plant Sugar" – 2:17
10. "Temporary Love" – 3:30
