= Good Nature (Turnover album) =

Studio album by Turnover
- Released: August 25, 2017
- Recorded: 2016–2017
- Genre: Indie rock; dream pop
- Length: 41:47
- Label: Run for Cover
- Producer: Will Yip

Turnover chronology
Peripheral Vision (2015)	Good Nature (2017)	Altogether (2019)

Singles from Good Nature
- 1. "Super Natural" Released: June 21, 2017; 2. "Sunshine Type" Released: July 26, 2017

Good Nature is the third studio album by American rock band Turnover, released on August 25, 2017, on Run for Cover Records.

== Background and production ==
Good Nature was recorded with producer Will Yip, who had worked with the band on their previous album, Peripheral Vision. It is the last album by the band to feature lead guitarist Eric Soucy, who has since been released from the band due to allegations of emotional abuse. The album came together in 2016, with vocalist and guitarist Austin Getz finalising the lyrics while the band was on tour in Europe. In the accompanying press release for the album, Getz describes the album as:

Learning. This whole record is about learning. Opening your eyes to new things, going outside of your comfort zone, and learning to grow into something new.

== Release ==
Following allegations of emotional abuse, guitarist Eric Soucy was removed from the group in June 2017. That same day, Good Nature was announced, and "Super Natural" was released. On August 14, "Bonnie (Rhythm & Melody)" was made available for streaming. Good Nature was released on August 25. Following this, they embarked on a headlining US tour with support from Elvis Depressedly and Emma Ruth Rundle. They went on another US headliner in early 2018 with support from Camp Cope and Summer Salt. In July, the band appeared at the Mo Pop festival. In November and December, the band supported The Story So Far on their US headlining tour. The band embarked on a headlining US tour in April and May, with support from Turnstile and Reptaliens; the stint included an appearance at the Spring Fling festival.

== Reception ==
Professional ratings
Review scores
Source	Rating
AllMusic	3.5/5 stars
DIY	4/5 stars
Exclaim!	8/10
Pitchfork	7.3/10
Rolling Stone Australia	3.5/5 stars

Before release, Alternative Press included the album on their list of the most anticipated albums of the year.

== Track listing ==
All songs written by Turnover and Will Yip.

1. "Super Natural" – 4:18
2. "Sunshine Type" – 3:07
3. "What Got in the Way" - 3:38
4. "Butterfly Dream" - 3:28
5. "Curiosity" - 3:38
6. "Pure Devotion" - 3:52
7. "Nightlight Girl" - 3:47
8. "Breeze" - 3:22
9. "All That It Ever Was" - 4:00
10. "Living Small" - 3:29
11. "Bonnie (Rhythm & Melody)" – 5:08

== Personnel ==
Turnover

- Danny Dempsey – bass
- Austin Getz – vocals, guitar
- Casey Getz – drums, percussion
- Eric Soucy – guitar

Additional personnel

- Will Yip – producer, engineer, mixing, songwriting

== Charts ==
Chart (2017)	Peak position
US Billboard 200	79
US Top Alternative Albums (Billboard)	10
US Top Rock Albums (Billboard)	9
