= As You Please =

2017 Citizen album

Studio album by Citizen
- Released: October 6, 2017
- Recorded: Early 2017
- Genre: Alternative rock; emo; shoegaze
- Length: 47:57
- Label: Run for Cover
- Producer: Will Yip

Citizen chronology
Everybody Is Going to Heaven (2015)	As You Please (2017)	Life in Your Glass World (2021)

Singles from As You Please
- 1. "Jet" Released: July 12, 2017; 2. "In the Middle of It All" Released: August 23, 2017; 3. "Flowerchild" Released: September 21, 2017; 4. "Fever Days" Released: May 17, 2018

As You Please is the third studio album by American rock band Citizen. The album was released on October 6, 2017 through Run for Cover Records. On October 24, 2018, Citizen uploaded a song that was not used on the album, "Open Your Heart", through the Run For Cover Records YouTube channel. In May 2018, the group embarked on a co-headlining US tour with Basement; they were supported by Pronoun and Souvenirs.

== Critical reception ==
Professional ratings
Aggregate scores
Source	Rating
Metacritic	77/100
Review scores
Source	Rating
AllMusic	3.5/5 stars
Alternative Press	4/5 stars
DIY	4/5 stars
Exclaim!	5/10
Kerrang!	4/5 stars
Pitchfork	6.5/10
Rock Sound	8/10
The Line of Best Fit	7.5/10

As You Please was well-received by most contemporary music critics. On review aggregator website, Metacritic, which normalizes music ratings, As You Please received an average score of 77 out of 100, indicating "generally favorable reviews based on 9 critics".

== Track listing ==
All music is composed by Citizen.

As You Please track listing
No.	Title	Length
1.	"Jet"	3:44
2.	"In the Middle of It All"	4:17
3.	"As You Please"	4:13
4.	"Medicine"	4:13
5.	"Ugly Luck"	4:00
6.	"World"	3:44
7.	"Fever Days"	3:35
8.	"Control"	3:57
9.	"Discrete Routine"	3:45
10.	"I Forgive No One"	4:07
11.	"You Are a Star"	4:13
12.	"Flowerchild"	4:36
Total length:		47:57

== Charts ==
Chart performance for As You Please
Chart (2017)	Peak position
US Heatseekers Albums (Billboard)	2
US Independent Albums (Billboard)	9
US Top Album Sales (Billboard)	46
US Top Rock Albums (Billboard)	45
US Top Tastemaker Albums (Billboard)	24
US Vinyl Albums (Billboard)	12
