= Turnover (band) =

American rock band

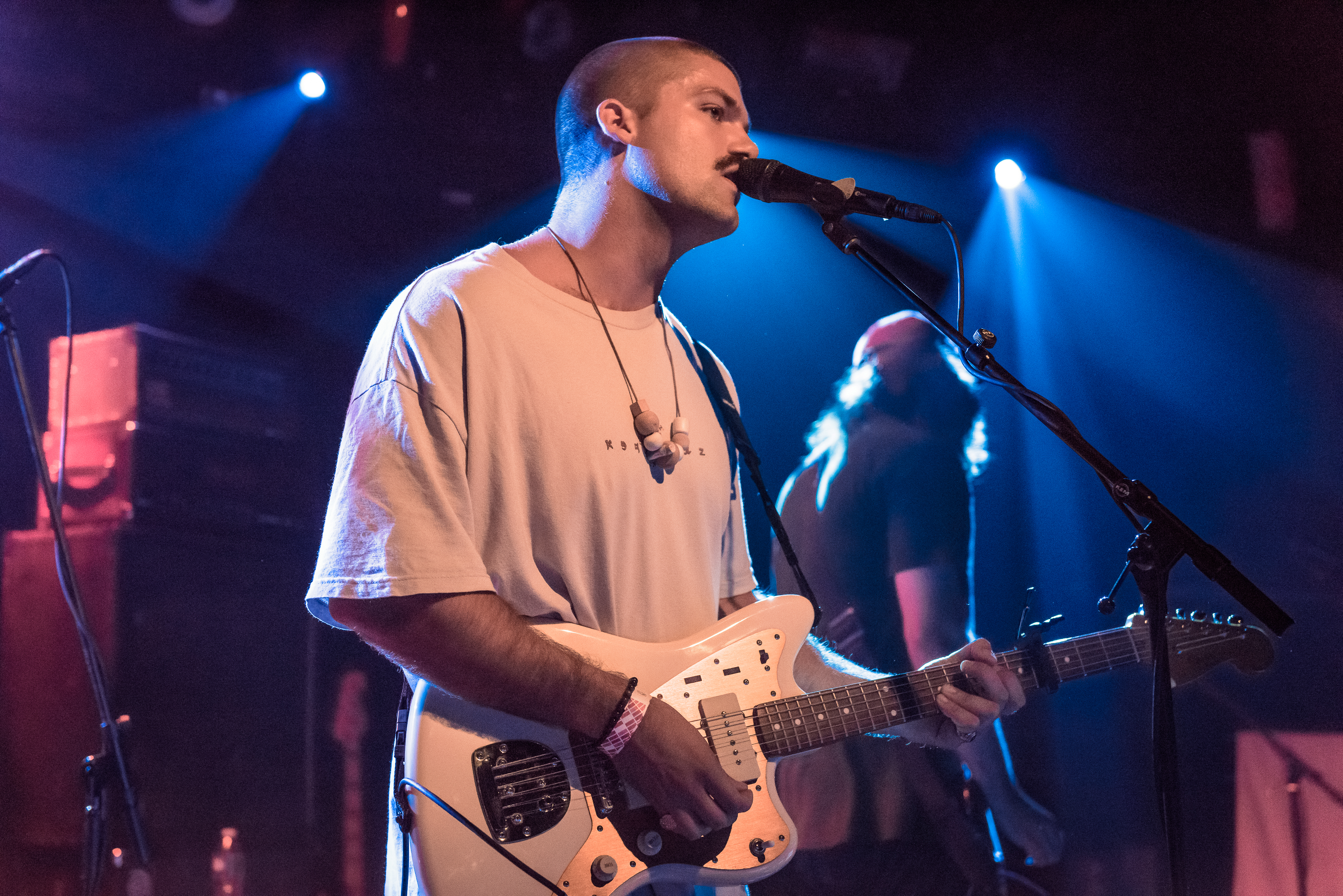
- Turnover performing live in 2015

Background information
- Origin: Virginia Beach, Virginia, U.S.
- Genres: Indie rock; dream pop; soft grunge; emo; pop punk (early)
- Years active: 2009–present
- Labels: Broken Rim; Run for Cover; Audiotree Music
- Members: Austin Getz; Casey Getz; Danny Dempsey; Nick Rayfield
- Past members: Alex Dimaiuat; Kyle Kojan; Eric Soucy
- Website: www.turnovermusic.net

Turnover is an American rock band from Virginia Beach, Virginia. The band were formed in 2009 by brothers Austin (vocals, rhythm guitar) and Casey (drums) Getz alongside longtime friend Danny Dempsey (bass); the three have gone on to oversee every iteration of the band to date. The three are currently joined in the band by lead guitarist Nick Rayfield, who began touring with the band in 2017 and was later officially inducted as a full-time member in 2022. Turnover have released six studio albums and four EPs across their career. Their most recent album, Down on Earth, was released on May 29th 2026.

== History ==
Turnover began in 2009, originally consisting of vocalist Austin Getz, rhythm guitarist/backing vocalist Kyle Kojan, lead guitarist Alex Dimaiuat, bassist Danny Dempsey and drummer Casey Getz. In 2011, the group released their debut E.P. Turnover on Broken Rim Records. In 2012, they released a split single with Citizen, and signed to Run for Cover Records. In December 2011 and January 2012, the band went on a winter tour with True Things. In 2012, the band went on a summer tour with Citizen and Light Years. Towards the end of 2012, Dimaiuat left the group. Shortly afterwards, Austin Getz began playing rhythm guitar in the group, moving Kojan to lead guitar and converting the quintet into a four-piece. In 2013, the band released their debut album Magnolia. Shortly afterwards, Kojan left the group. He was replaced by Eric Soucy, who officially became the band's new lead guitarist the following year.

Soon after their summer tour, the band went on a seven date tour in August with Young Statues and PJ Bond. In June 2013, the band went on a co-headlining tour with Koji, supported by Ivy League, and Have Mercy. In February 2014, the band went on an east coast tour with Turnstile, Diamond Youth, Angel Dust, and Blind Justice. In March 2014, the band went on tour with I Am the Avalanche, The Swellers, and Diamond Youth. In May 2014, the band went on two UK tours. One tour was with I Am the Avalanche, Major League, and Moose Blood. The other tour was with Major League and Nai Harvest. In fall of 2014, the band went on a tour with Light Years and Malfunction. Also in 2014, the band released their sophomore E.P. Blue Dream.

The band went on a 25-date tour in March and April 2015, supporting New Found Glory. In March 2015, the band announced plans to release their second studio album, titled Peripheral Vision in May via Run For Cover. The album's lead single, "Cutting My Fingers Off", came out on March 16, 2015. The album was released on May 4, 2015. The album marked a shift in sound from the band's previous work, being described as dream pop rather than pop punk. In 2016, the group released the single "Humblest Pleasures", and continued to tour in support of Peripheral Vision.

The band's third album, Good Nature, was announced for an August 2017 release. The lead single, "Super Natural," was released to YouTube and streaming services on June 21. The album was again produced by Yip and released on Run for Cover. Good Nature would prove to be the group's last release with Soucy, who was dismissed from the group shortly prior to the album's release following allegations of emotional abuse. He was replaced by touring guitarist Nick Rayfield.

In 2019, Austin Getz began playing keyboards in the group, and the band recruited touring rhythm guitarist Shane Moran (formerly of Title Fight), making them a live five-piece for the first time since 2012. That same year, the band released their fourth studio album, Altogether.

In 2022, the band released their fifth studio album, Myself in the Way. Rayfield was inducted as a full-time member of the band that same year.

On December 10, 2024, Turnover announced a 2025 tour with dates in the US and England to celebrate the 10-year anniversary of Peripheral Vision, planning to perform the album in full for the first time.

== Musical style and influences ==
According to AllMusic, Turnover outgrew their roots in emo and punk rock and evolved their style into "a more introspective sound that incorporated the lushness of dream pop and the tender melodies of indie pop".

Magnolia has been categorized as emo and pop punk. Peripheral Vision has been categorized as indie rock, soft grunge and dream pop.

Turnover have cited early influences including Title Fight, Balance and Composure, Sunny Day Real Estate, Texas is the Reason, American Football, Braid, Mineral, Knapsack, Gods Reflex, Saves the Day, Jawbreaker, Lifetime, the Movielife, the Beach Boys, Prince and Blink-182. On Peripheral Vision (2015) they began to incorporate the influence of the contemporary dream pop artists signed to Captured Tracks such as Wild Nothing, Beach Fossils and DIIV, as well as Beach House. Other influences included the post-punk revival of Interpol and Bloc Party, shoegaze of Ride, Slowdive, My Bloody Valentine, and the various styles of Dinosaur Jr., Cocteau Twins, New Order, Joy Division, the Smiths, the Cure and the National. On Good Nature (2017), they pivoted to being influenced by Simon and Garfunkel, Crosby Stills & Nash, Earth, Wind & Fire and the Beatles, then on Altogether (2019) they were influenced by Chic, Bobby Womack and Curtis Mayfield.

== Band members ==
Current members

- Austin Getz – lead vocals (2009–present), rhythm guitar (2012–present), lead guitar (2019–2022; in studio only), keyboards (2019–present)
- Casey Getz – drums (2009–present)
- Daniel Dempsey – bass (2009–present), backing vocals (2017–present)
- Nick Rayfield – lead guitar (2022–present; touring musician 2017–2022), backing vocals (2019–present)

Former members

- Alex Dimaiuat – lead guitar (2009–2012)
- Kyle Kojan – rhythm guitar (2009–2012), lead guitar (2012–2013), backing vocals (2009–2013)
- Eric Soucy – lead guitar, backing vocals (2014–2017; touring musician 2013–2014)

Former touring musicians

- Shane Moran – rhythm guitar (2019–2022 )

Timeline

== Discography ==
Studio albums

- Magnolia (2013)
- Peripheral Vision (2015)
- Good Nature (2017)
- Altogether (2019)
- Myself in the Way (2022)
- Down on Earth (2026)
