= Calling the Dogs =

Studio album by Citizen
- Released: October 6, 2023
- Genre: Alternative rock
- Length: 33:40
- Label: Run for Cover
- Producer: Rob Schnapf

Citizen chronology
Life in Your Glass World (2021)	Calling the Dogs (2023)	Halcyon Blues (2026)

Singles from Calling the Dogs
- 1. "If You're Lonely" Released: July 18, 2023; 2. "Hyper Trophy" Released: August 22, 2023; 3. "When I Let You Down" Released: September 12, 2023; 4. "Can't Take It Slow" Released: October 2, 2023

Calling the Dogs is the fifth studio album by American rock band Citizen, released on October 6, 2023, through Run for Cover Records. The album was produced by Rob Schnapf, and features the band's touring members Ben Russin and Mason Mercer on drums and guitar, respectively.

== Critical reception ==
Professional ratings
Review scores
Source	Rating
Dork	4/5 stars

Rob Mair of Dork commented that Calling the Dogs "finds the group embracing their pop and indie sensibilities" and "what's perhaps most interesting about all of this is how un-American it all sounds", as the album "pulls as much from New Order and Bloc Party as it does The Strokes or The Killers". Mair concluded that it is "another delightful twist for a band that just can't stand still". Kirstie Rouse of New Noise Magazine wrote that the album "shows the growth the band has experienced and is the band at their best", also describing it as "roughly 35 minutes of pure, polished energy with a raw feel to it".

== Track listing ==
Calling the Dogs track listing
No.	Title	Length
1.	"Headtrip"	3:18
2.	"Can't Take It Slow"	3:35
3.	"Hyper Trophy"	2:55
4.	"If You're Lonely"	4:04
5.	"Lay Low"	2:31
6.	"Needs"	2:51
7.	"Bad Company"	2:44
8.	"Dogs"	2:21
9.	"When I Let You Down"	2:59
10.	"Options"	4:27
11.	"Takes One to Know One"	1:55
Total length:		33:40

== Personnel ==
Citizen

- Eric Hamm – bass, backing vocals
- Nick Hamm – lead guitar, synthesizer, backing vocals
- Mat Kerekes – lead vocals, synthesizer
- Mason Mercer – rhythm guitar, synthesizer
- Ben Russin – drums, percussion

Additional contributors

- Rob Schnapf – production, mixing, programming
- Austin Coupe – mixing, mastering
- Matt Scheussler – engineering
