= PJ Bond =

American singer-songwriter

- Origin: New Brunswick, New Jersey, United States
- Genres: Folk, folk-punk, indie rock, alternative country
- Occupation: Singer-songwriter
- Instruments: Vocals, guitar, bass guitar
- Years active: 1997–present
- Label: Black Numbers
- Website: www.pjbondmusic.com

Patrick John "PJ" Bond is an American singer and songwriter. He released a full-length solo album, You Didn't Know I Was Alphabetical, in 2009. He has also released a split album – Brother Bones / Baby Bones (2012) – with his brother, Brian, and two extended plays (EPs), April 22: Vienna, Austria and Ten Degrees and the Floor, both in 2011.

== Biography ==
PJ Bond, born in New Brunswick, New Jersey, had stints in a handful of bands in the 2000s including Outsmarting Simon, The Color Fred, and Communipaw. He decided to pursue a solo career after Outsmarting Simon, which had released two albums on Triple Crown Records, went on an indefinite hiatus. Bond released his first full-length studio album, You Didn't Know I Was Alphabetical, in 2009. In a review of the album, Jason Schneider of Exclaim! remarked that Bond's "eloquence and clarity approach Paul Westerberg/Elliott Smith standards, in terms of making the mundane sound essential, and vice versa." Punknews.org said the album "doesn't embark on uncharted territory, but it doesn't need to; music has always been more about the ability to connect with the listener than wowing them with wankery. PJ Bond can get by on his melodic songwriting chops, playing wherever there's people willing to listen".

Bond released the April 22: Vienna, Austria EP in 2011. Named for the date and location of its recording, the EP contains seven tracks including three new songs and a cover version of NOFX's "Lori Meyers". Alternative Press writer Matt St. John said the EP "blends the rusty edge of Against Me!’s Tom Gabel and the country storytelling of Old 97's frontman Rhett Miller." Punknews.org called it "unsatisfyingly short, but that's just about its only major drawback." Another EP, Ten Degrees and the Floor, was released later that year, which Bond made available as a free download on Bandcamp. In 2012, he released the split album Brother Bones / Baby Bones. Each half features four songs performed by Bond and his brother Brian, respectively.

== Discography ==
- Fall, Tonight (2007?)
- You Didn't Know I Was Alphabetical (2009)
- April 22: Vienna, Austria (2011)
- Ten Degrees and the Floor (2011)
- Brother Bones / Baby Bones (2012)
- Where Were You? (2015)
