= Cruel Hand =

American hardcore punk band

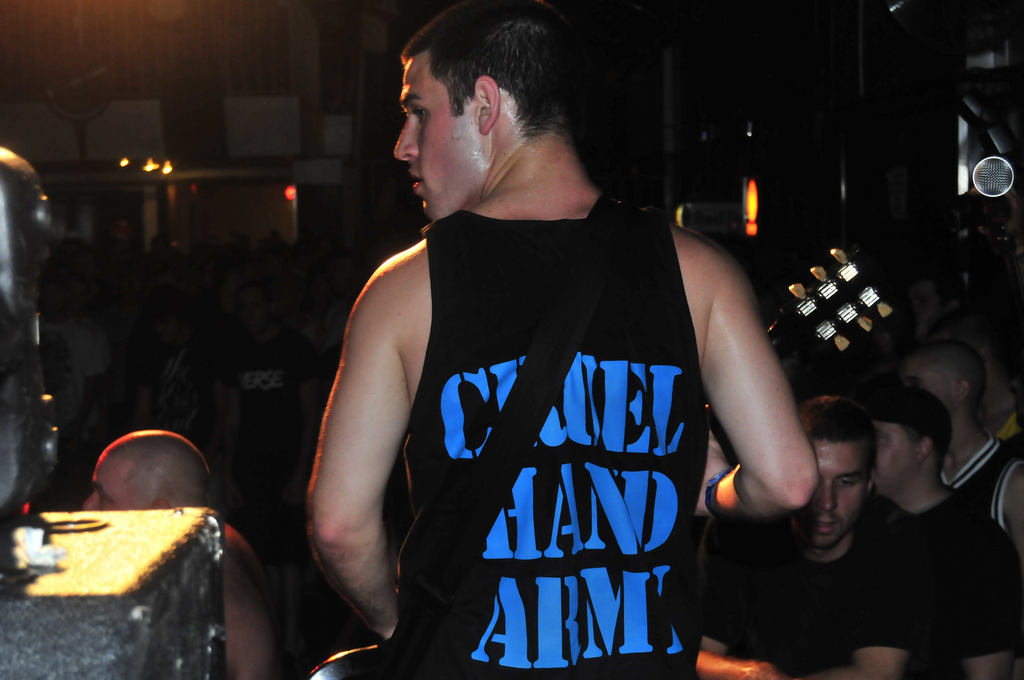
- Former Guitarist Cam Foley in 2009

Background information
- Origin: Portland, Maine, U.S.
- Genres: Hardcore punk
- Years active: 2006–present
- Labels: Hopeless, Bridge 9, 6131
- Members: Chris Linkovich – vocals Andrew Budwey – guitar Jeremy Breau – guitar Seger Daily – bass Ryan Goff – drums
- Website: cruelhand.com

Cruel Hand is an American hardcore punk band from Portland, Maine, that formed in 2006. As of 2016, Cruel Hand has released five full-length albums: Without a Pulse on 6131 Records, Prying Eyes and Lock & Key on Bridge 9 Records, The Negatives and Your World Won't Listen on Hopeless Records. The band has also released three EPs on Bridge 9: Life in Shambles, Cruel Hand and Born Into Debt, We All Owe a Death. Their song "Face to Face" is featured on Triple B Records' 2010 America's Hardcore Compilation.

== History ==
Cruel Hand formed in Portland, Maine, in 2006, originally as a side project of the punk band Outbreak, creating an opportunity for band members to play different instruments. In 2007 they released their debut album Without a Pulse, on 6131 Records. They played shows around the U.S. with Trash Talk and The Mongoloids, touring the United States three times and a full European tour. Cruel Hand then signed with Bridge 9 for their second album, Prying Eyes, which was recorded at Getaway Recording Studios and God City Studios in 2008. Cruel Hand released a self-titled 7-inch EP in 2010 featuring a song from their third album, Lock & Key and an unreleased track. Lock & Key was released on July 27, 2010, on Bridge 9 Records. They have toured extensively throughout the U.S., Europe, and Australia supporting their latest release. On November 5, 2012, Cruel hand released a new video and new track titled "Cheap Life".

Cruel Hand are influenced by the Cro-Mags, early Metallica, and Madball, and are often compared to the seminal Toronto hardcore band No Warning.

== Discography ==
Studio albums

- Without a Pulse (2007, 6131 Records)
- Prying Eyes (2008, Bridge 9 Records)
- Lock & Key (2010, Bridge 9 Records)
- The Negatives (2014, Hopeless Records)
- Your World Won't Listen (2016, Hopeless Records)

EPs

- Life in Shambles (2008, Bridge 9)
- Cruel Hand (2010, Bridge 9)
- Vigilant Citizen (2013, Triple B Records)
- Born Into Debt, We All Owe a Death (2013, Closed Casket Activities)
- Dark Side of the Cage (2021, Static Era Records)

Demos

- Cruel Hand Demo '06 (2006)

Music videos

- "3s" (2013)
- "Cheap Life" (2014)
- "Monument Square People" (2014)
- "Unhinged - Unraveled" (2014)
- "Heat" (2015)
- "Dead Eyes Watching" (2016)
- "Decompose" (2016)
