= Citizen (band) =

American rock band

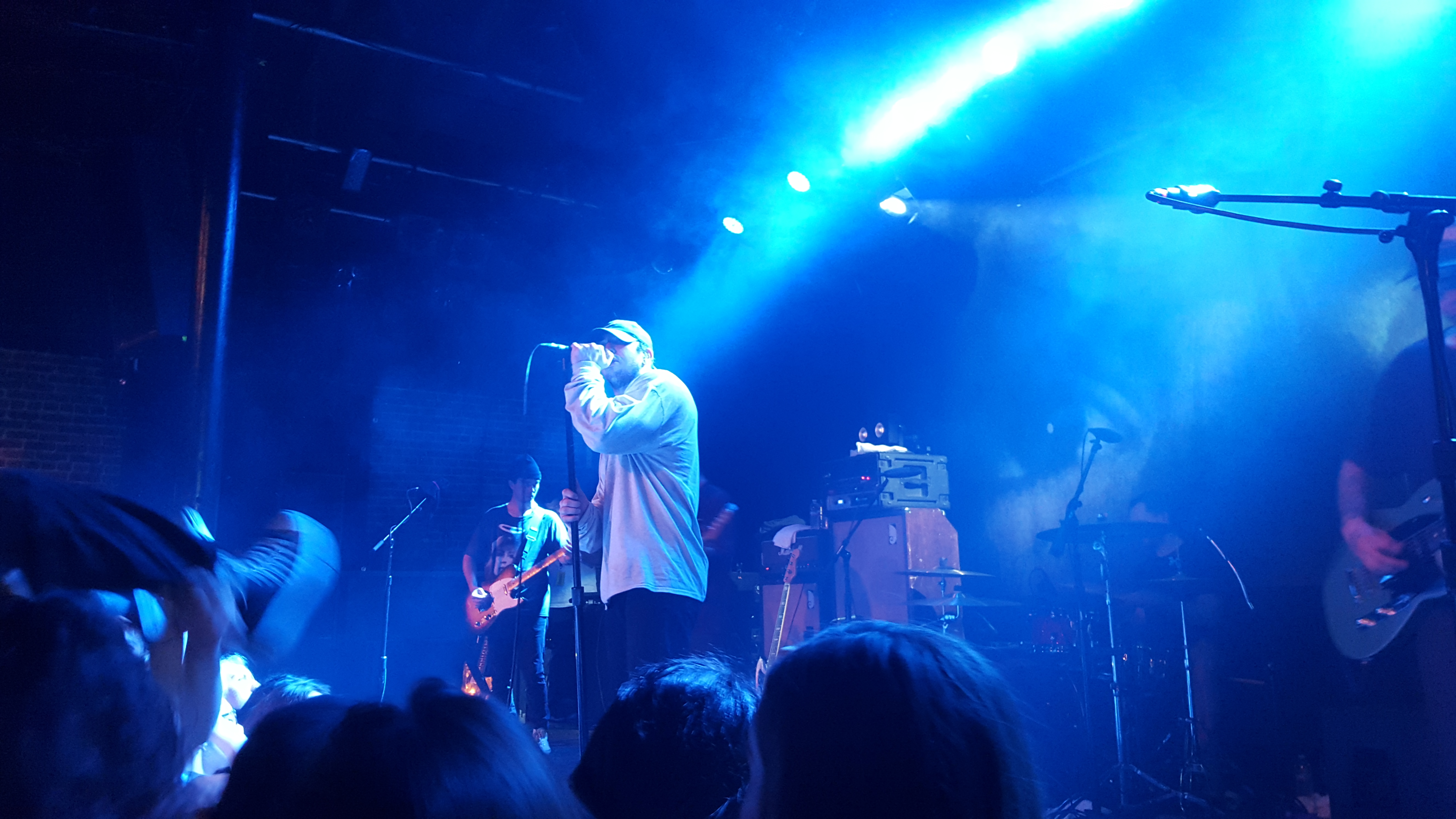
- Citizen performing at Slim's in San Francisco, California, March 2016.

Background information
- Origin: Toledo, Ohio, United States
- Genres: Emo; alternative rock; post-hardcore; soft grunge; shoegaze
- Years active: 2009–present
- Label: Run for Cover
- Spinoff of: The Sound of Glory
- Members: Mat Kerekes; Nick Hamm; Eric Hamm; Mason Mercer; Ben Russin
- Past members: Cray Wilson; Mike Armstrong; Jake Duhaime; Ryland Oehlers
- Website: citizentheband.net

Citizen is an American rock band formed in 2009. They were originally split between Southeast Michigan and Northwest Ohio and are currently based in Toledo, Ohio. Lead vocalist Mat Kerekes and brothers Nick (lead guitar) and Eric (bass) Hamm have featured in every lineup since formation; the present iteration features rhythm guitarist Mason Mercer and drummer Ben Russin. They are signed to Run for Cover Records and have released six studio albums to date: Youth (2013), Everybody Is Going to Heaven (2015), As You Please (2017), Life in Your Glass World (2021), Calling the Dogs (2023), and Halcyon Blues (2026). Considered a part of emo's fourth wave, Pitchfork has described Citizen as "a band their fans can grow up with rather than out of".

== History ==
=== Formation and early releases (2009–2012) ===
Mat Kerekes first formed the band in 2009 after departing as the drummer from his previous band, The Sound of Glory. The Sound of Glory was a metalcore band that had a large local following as well as somewhat of a regional following during their years of existence. This band included additional members of Citizen, Nick Hamm and Eric Hamm, on their same respective instruments. Additional members of the band were vocalist Josh Childress (guitarist of The Plot in You) and a second guitarist to The Sound of Glory, Joey Chester. The early material of Citizen displayed an easycore sound much unlike their present day music. The band released their first demo shortly after formation. Citizen played their first show on January 28, 2010, at Frankie's Inner City in Toledo, Ohio where they opened for Set Your Goals.

In May 2011, the band made an appearance at Bled Fest. The band also released a split EP with The Fragile Season, titled The Only Place I Know.

After signing with Run for Cover Records in March 2012, Citizen began recording a Split EP with labelmates Turnover. Run for Cover Records states that this Split marks growth and maturity for both bands as they go from up and coming locals to established national artists. After the release of Citizen and Turnover's split EP on May 22, 2012, Citizen and Turnover went on a summer tour, along with the band Light Years.

In September 2011, Citizen released an EP titled Young States which was then reissued the following year in September 2012 by Run for Cover Records. Shortly after the reissue of Young States Citizen went on a supporting tour with bands Aficionado and Mixtapes, followed by a tour with Such Gold, Mixtapes, and Raindance. Finally, Citizen went on a brief fall headlining tour with State Champs and Candy Hearts as supporting acts.

=== Youth (2013–2014) ===
In February 2013, Citizen began recording their debut studio album Youth in studio 4 with producer Will Yip and released Youth on June 11, 2013. Youth features ten tracks along with a bonus acoustic version of their song "How Does It Feel?" In an interview with Beyond the Pit Press, when asked how Citizen came up with the title of their album, guitarist Nick Hamm stated that Youth is a coming of age record. After the Release of Youth Citizen played on the 2013 Vans Warped Tour. Following the Vans Warped tour Citizen played a record release show for Youth in their Hometown of Toledo, OH. In June 2014, the band announced they would be going on a fall tour in support of Youth, starting early September in Toronto, Canada, and ending mid-October in Cleveland, Ohio. The tour was supported by the bands You Blew It!, Hostage Calm, Praise, and True Love.

=== Everybody Is Going to Heaven (2015–2016) ===
On April 26, 2015 Citizen announced plans to release their second full-length album, Everybody Is Going to Heaven, on June 23, 2015, via Run for Cover. Before the release of the album, Citizen premiered a music video for their song Stain which appears on the album. The album was made available for streaming via Run for Cover's Bandcamp page on June 9, 2015. The album charted at number 2 on the Billboard Vinyl Albums chart.

=== As You Please (2017–2020) ===
During October 2017 Citizen released their third album, As You Please, with Run for Cover Records. Soon after the release of their third album Citizen began the As You Please Tour, accompanied by Sorority Noise and Great Grandpa.

In 2018 the band embarked on a tour in support of The Story So Far along with Turnover and Movements. The following year, they released a stand-alone single entitled "Big Mouth". Drummer Jake Duhaime had departed the band by this point, with Kerekes taking his place in the studio. By the end of 2019, the remaining quartet had material written for a fourth album. Recording took place in Toledo, Ohio, during the winter of 2019 and into early 2020. Later in 2020, the band shared the unreleased track "Clox" — which was written and recorded for As You Please but was ultimately left off the album.

=== Life in Your Glass World and Youth anniversary (2021–2023) ===
On January 11, 2021, the band announced their fourth full-length album Life in Your Glass World (on Run for Cover Records) and released the lead single, "I Want to Kill You". The band's new press photos for the album showed only Kerekes and the Hamm brothers, confirming Oehlers' departure. Ironically, it was Oehlers himself that took the press photos in question. The band later confirmed that Oehlers played on the album, and would still occasionally contribute in the studio, but was no longer an official member of Citizen. Oehlers has gone on to focus on his career as a front-end developer full-time since departing the band.

In the months before the album's release, its second and third singles ("Blue Sunday" and "Black and Red") were released on digital streaming services. On March 26, 2021, Life in Your Glass World was released. The band toured in support of the album with two touring musicians: Mason Mercer on rhythm guitar and Ronnie Farris on drums. The latter was replaced by former Title Fight drummer Ben Russin later that year, who had previously worked with the band as their tour manager. In April 2022, the band shared a new stand-alone single entitled "Bash Out". Mercer served as the director of the music video.

In January 2023, the band announced a North American tour to commemorate the 10-year anniversary of their debut album Youth. Citizen performed the album in full at every show on the run, and were joined by Fiddlehead on the tour. The album was also reissued on vinyl.

=== Calling the Dogs and Halcyon Blues (2023–present) ===
In July 2023, Citizen announced their fifth studio album Calling the Dogs, which was released on October 6, 2023. The band also shared the album's lead single "If You're Lonely", which they had premiered on the Youth anniversary tour earlier that year. With the announcement of the album came the confirmation that both Mercer and Russin had joined the band as official members. The band toured in support of the album across North America with Narrow Head in 2023, and toured as an opening act for Taking Back Sunday in 2024 and Movements in 2025. Also in 2025, the band performed a one-off show in which they performed Everyone is Going to Heaven in its entirety to commemorate its 10-year anniversary. The show was recorded and released as the live album and film Everybody is Going to Heaven – Live in Detroit, exclusively on cassette and VHS, respectively.

In April 2026, the band announced their sixth studio album, Halcyon Blues, and released its lead single, "Highs and Lows". The album was released on August 7, 2026. The album is to be supported by a world tour running from August 2026 to March 2027.

== Musical style ==
AllMusic biographer Jason Lymangrover who called the band's sound a merge of "bombastic emo pop, post-hardcore, and thick, chunky indie rock". The band has also been described as indie rock and soft grunge. Youth has been described as emo, pop punk, post-hardcore, and punk rock. Everybody Is Going to Heaven has been described as alternative rock, emo, and shoegaze. Citizen has been described as a number of genres but in a 2013 interview with Cosmos Gaming, guitar player Nick Hamm states that while people are right to assign those genres to their band, he views Citizen as being simply a rock band.

They have cited influences including Sonic Youth, Hum, Nirvana and Title Fight.

== Concert tours ==
- Youth Tour (2013)
- Citizen Fall Tour (2014)
- Citizen/Turnover Co-Headlining Tour (2016)
- As You Please Tour (2017)
- Citizen/Knuckle Puck Co-Headlining Tour (2019)
- Decade of Youth (2023)

== Band members ==
Current members

- Mat Kerekes – lead vocals, sampler, keyboards (2009–present), drums (2019–2021; in-studio only)
- Nick Hamm – lead guitar, backing vocals (2009–present), rhythm guitar (2020–2021; in-studio only)
- Eric Hamm – bass, occasional backing vocals (2009–present)
- Ben Russin – drums (2023–present; touring musician 2021–2023)
- Mason Mercer – rhythm guitar (2023–present; touring musician 2021–2023)

Former members

- Ryland Oehlers – rhythm guitar, backing vocals (2009–2020; occasional session musician 2021–present)
- Mike Armstrong – drums (2009–2012)
- Cray Wilson – drums (2012–2014)
- Jake Duhaime – drums (2014–2019)
- Ronnie Farris – drums (2021, touring)

Timeline

== Discography ==
Studio albums

- Youth (2013)
- Everybody Is Going to Heaven (2015)
- As You Please (2017)
- Life in Your Glass World (2021)
- Calling the Dogs (2023)
- Halcyon Blues (2026)

Extended plays

- Young States (2011)

Splits

- The Only Place I Know (split w/ The Fragile Season) (2011)
- Citizen / Turnover (split w/ Turnover) (2012)

Singles

- "Silo" (2014)
- "Nail in Your Hand" (2015)
- "Jet" (2017)
- "Open Your Heart" (2018)
- "Big Mouth" (2019)
- "Clox" (2020)
- "I Want to Kill You" (2021)
- "Blue Sunday" (2021)
- "Black and Red" (2021)
- "Bash Out" (2022)
- "If You're Lonely" (2023)
- "Hyper Trophy" (2023)
- "When I Let You Down" (2023)
- "Can't Take It Slow" (2023)
- "Highs and Lows" (2026)

Other releases

- Demo (2009)
