= The Wonder Years discography =

- Studio albums: 7
- EPs: 6
- Compilation albums: 2
- Music videos: 15
- Split singles: 7

The discography of The Wonder Years, an American rock band, consists of seven studio albums, two compilation albums and twelve extended plays.

== Studio albums ==
List of studio albums, with selected chart positions
Title	Details	Peak chart positions						Sales
Title	Details	US	US Rock	US Indie	US Alt	AUS	UK	Sales
Get Stoked on It!	Released: October 30, 2007; Label: No Sleep (NSR005); Format: CD, DL	—	—	—	—	—	—	
The Upsides	Released: January 26, 2010; Label: No Sleep (NSR022); Format: CD, DL, LP	—	—	42	—	—	—	
Suburbia I've Given You All and Now I'm Nothing	Released: June 14, 2011; Label: Hopeless (HR729); Format: CD, DL, LP	73	20	11	12	—	—	
The Greatest Generation	Released: May 14, 2013; Label: Hopeless (HR771); Format: CD, DL, LP	20	4	3	4	—	—	US: 50,000
No Closer to Heaven	Released: September 4, 2015; Label: Hopeless (HR2172); Format: CD, CS, DL, LP	12	3	4	1	59	46	
Sister Cities	Released: April 6, 2018; Label: Hopeless/Loneliest Place on Earth (HR2469-2); Format: CD, digital download, LP	18	5	1	3	—	70	
The Hum Goes on Forever	Released: September 23, 2022; Label: Hopeless; Formats: streaming	—	—	46	—	—	—	
"—" denotes a recording that did not chart or was not released in that territory.

== Compilation albums ==
List of compilation albums, with selected chart positions
Title	Details	Peak chart positions
Title	Details	US Indie
I Refuse to Sink: A Collection of Prior Recordings	Released: 2009; Label: No Sleep (NSR020); Format: CD	—
Sleeping on Trash: A Collection of Songs Recorded 2005–2010	Released: February 11, 2013; Label: No Sleep (NSR074); Format: CD, DL, LP	46

== Extended plays ==
List of extended plays
Title	Details	Peak chart positions	
Title	Details	US	US Rock
2007 Tour EP	Released: September 1, 2007; Label: No Sleep (NSR005-EP); Format: CD	—	—
Won't Be Pathetic Forever	Released: June 10, 2008; Label: No Sleep (NSR009); Format: DL, 7" vinyl	—	—
Get Stoked on It! Radio EP	Released: October 8, 2009; Label: No Sleep (NSR005-RADIO); Format: CD	—	—
2009 5 Song Radio EP	Released: 2009; Label: No Sleep (NSR009+14); Format: CD	—	—
Manton Street	Released: 2013; Label: Run for Cover (RFC067); Format: 7" vinyl	—	—
Burst & Decay (An Acoustic EP)	Released: September 22, 2017; Label: Hopeless/Loneliest Place on Earth (HR2406-1/LPOE001-1); Format: 12" vinyl, DL	142	25

== Split singles ==
List of split singles
Title	Details
The Wonder Years / Emergency and I (split with Emergency and I)	Released: 2005; Label: Self-released; Format: CD-R
Bangarang! / The Wonder Years (split with Bangarang!)	Released: 2006; Label: Forgive & Forget (FFR001); Format: CD, DL
Distances (split with All or Nothing)	Released: March 10, 2009; Label: No Sleep (NSR009); Format: DL, 7" vinyl
Under the Influence, Vol. 13 (split with Fallen from the Sky)	Released: May 2010; Label: Suburban Home (SH 162-7); Format: 7" vinyl
The Wonder Years vs. Heroes for Hire – A Split Record (split with Heroes for Hire)	Released: September 10, 2010; Label: Boomtown/Hopeless (SH 162-7); Format: 7" vinyl
Punk Is Dead. Get a Job. (split with Stay Ahead of the Weather)	Released: April 24, 2012; Label: Hopeless (HR 9753-1); Format: 6" vinyl
(Sort Of) A Song for Patsy Cline / It's (Sort Of) a Pleasure to Meet You (split with Motion City Soundtrack)	Released: November 2015; Label: Hopeless (HR2185-7); Format: 7" vinyl

== Other appearances ==
List of other appearances, showing year released and album name
Title	Year	Album
"Christmas at 22"	2008	No Sleep 'Till Christmas
"Cheap Shots, Youth Anthems" (Kid Dynamite cover)	2009	Carry the Torch: A Tribute to Kid Dynamite
"Hey Julie" (Fountains of Wayne cover)	2011	Vs. the Earthquake
"Aside" (The Weakerthans cover)	2011	Take Action Volume 10
"Cooking Wine" (Alkaline Trio cover)	2011	A3T: A Tribute to Alkaline Trio
"Anchor" (Into It. Over It. cover)	2012	The Glamour Kills Tour Compilation
"Living Room Song" (full band version)	2014	A Comp for Mom

== Videography ==
List of music videos, showing year released and director
Title	Year	Director
"My Geraldine Lies Over the Delaware"	2007	
"Melrose Diner"	2010	Penta
"Don't Let Me Cave In"	2011	Ryan Mackfall
"Came Out Swinging"	2011	Guise (Mitchell Wojcik & Samuel Gursky)
"Local Man Ruins Everything"	2011	Guise (Mitchell Wojcik & Samuel Gursky)
"Living Room Song"	2012	
"Passing Through a Screen Door"	2013	Guise (Mitchell Wojcik & Samuel Gursky)
"There, There"	2013	Jeremi Mattern
"Dismantling Summer"	2014	Drew Russ
"Cardinals"	2015	Kevin Slack
"Cigarettes & Saints"	2015	Jeremi Mattern
"Stained Glass Ceilings"	2016	Jeremi Mattern
"Sister Cities"	2018	Josh Coll
"Raining in Kyoto"	2018	Josh Coll
"Out On My Feet"	2020	Trevor Bowman & Catalogue Company
"Summer Clothes"	2022	Josh Coll
"Wyatt's Song"	2022	Benjamin Lieber
"Old Friends Like Lost Teeth"	2022	Benjamin Lieber
"Lost It In The Lights"	2022	Yasha Eskandar
"Laura & The Beehive"	2022	Dan Campbell
"Low Tide"	2022	Brad Wyllner
"GODDAMNITALL"	2023	Mitchell Wojcik
"Year of the Vulture"	2024	The Wonder Years
"Junebug"	2025	Catalog Co.
