= Dan Campbell (singer) =

American rock musician (born 1986)

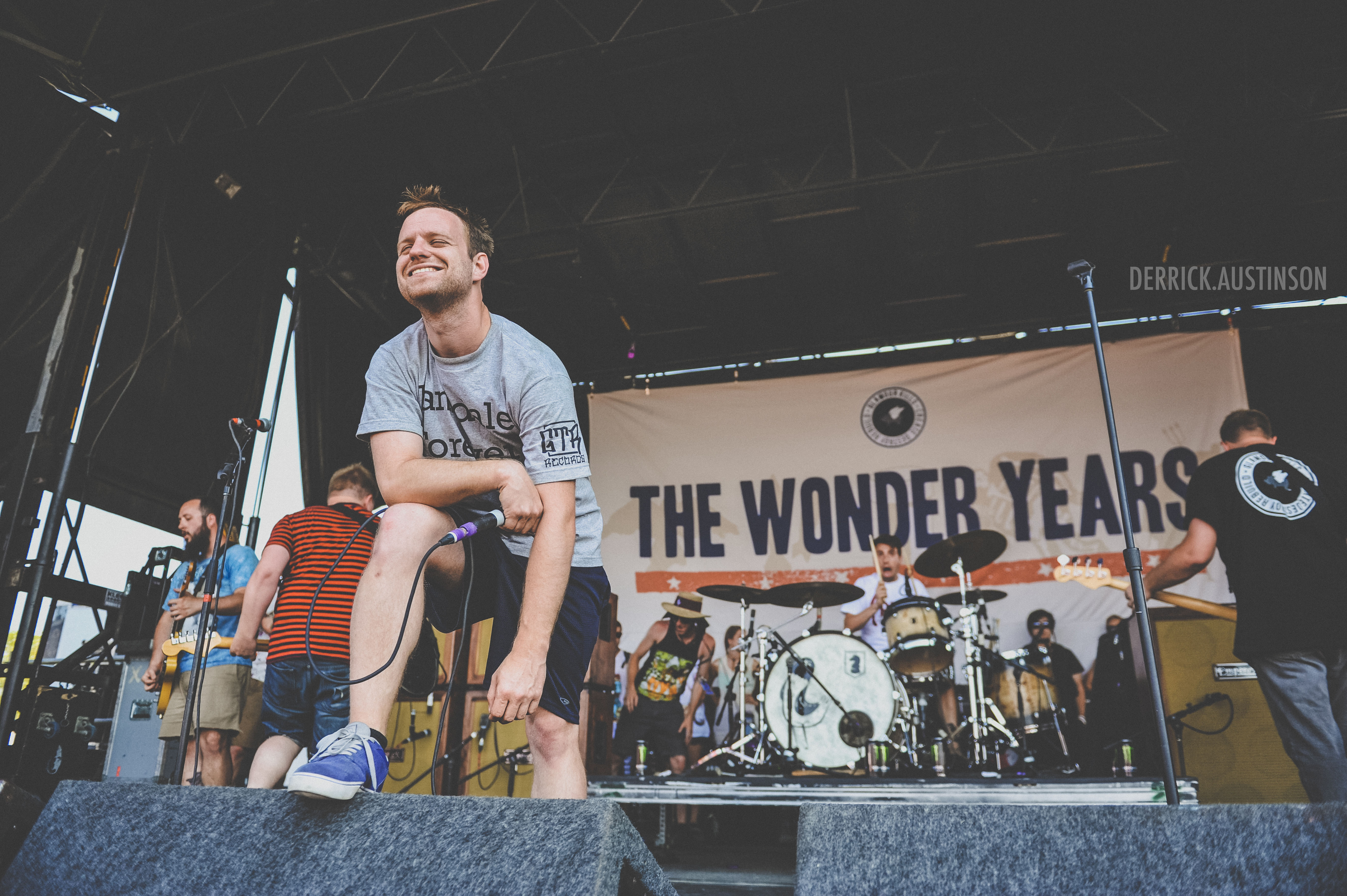
- Campbell performing with The Wonder Years at Warped Tour 2013 in Mesa, Arizona

Background information
- Also known as: Soupy, Aaron West
- Born: January 17, 1986 (age 40); Lansdale, Pennsylvania, U.S.
- Genres: Pop punk; alternative rock; emo; folk rock; indie rock
- Occupations: Singer; songwriter; musician; record producer
- Years active: 2005–present
- Labels: No Sleep; Hopeless; Loneliest Place on Earth
- Member of: The Wonder Years; Aaron West and the Roaring Twenties

Daniel Jason "Soupy" Campbell (born January 17, 1986) is an American singer, songwriter, musician, and record producer from Lansdale, Pennsylvania. He is best known as the lead vocalist and songwriter for American pop punk band The Wonder Years, as well as the creator of folk rock project Aaron West and the Roaring Twenties.

== Early life ==
Campbell graduated from the Temple University College of Education in 2011, and worked with K-12 students at Tanner G. Duckrey School and Joseph C. Ferguson School during his college career.

== Career ==
=== The Wonder Years (2005–present) ===
Campbell was originally part of a band called The Premier, which he "thought had a lot of potential," but "kind of couldn't get a foothold on anything," and the members chose to break up and attend college. The Wonder Years were supposed to be "just a fun thing to do on the side when we were bored."

The band signed to No Sleep Records in 2007 and released their first full-length studio album, Get Stoked on It!, later that year. Campbell has largely disavowed the album, calling it an "unmitigated disaster." Sophomore effort The Upsides (2010), was released to critical acclaim, and propelled the band to the forefront of the pop punk scene.

Shortly after the release of The Upsides, the band signed to Hopeless Records, and released follow-up album Suburbia I've Given You All and Now I'm Nothing the next year. The Upsides, Suburbia, and The Greatest Generation (2013) together make up a trilogy of albums surrounding Campbell's struggles with fear, loneliness, and feeling lost.

Campbell suffered writer's block following the release of The Greatest Generation, and decided that he didn't "want to write about the suburban American experience anymore." Instead, the next Wonder Years album, No Closer to Heaven (2015), was a concept album surrounding the loss of a loved one. The band's follow-up album, Sister Cities (2018), similarly follows a thematic link of unity.

=== Aaron West and the Roaring Twenties (2014–present) ===
In 2013, Campbell created an acoustic side project, Aaron West and the Roaring Twenties, in an attempt to hone his guitar abilities. The project was originally intended to be a series of fictional vignettes, but he settled on writing "a whole album about one guy." Campbell cited the Mountain Goats album All Hail West Texas and the Weakerthans album Reunion Tour as influences, speaking to how they created such real, whole characters that I found myself invested in their lives and their stories."

The project's first album, We Don't Have Each Other, was released on July 8, 2014 via Hopeless to largely positive reviews. The next year, Aaron West appeared as part of the Acoustic Basement segment of Warped Tour. A follow-up EP, Bittersweet, was released May 20, 2016, and the non-album single "Orchard Park" was released on October 5, 2017. The project's sophomore LP, Routine Maintenance was released May 10, 2019.

What is described as the final Aaron West album In Lieu of Flowers was released April 12th, 2024.

=== Other ventures ===
Campbell helped produce British pop punk band Trash Boat's debut album, Nothing I Write You Can Change What You've Been Through (2016), and contributed a vocal feature to the track "Strangers".

In 2018, Campbell and Ace Enders of The Early November announced Clear Eyes Fanzine, a "musical fanzine" dedicated to the TV show Friday Night Lights. Their first EP, Season One, Episodes 1-6 (2019) featured three songs by Campbell and three by Enders.

Campbell was one artist selected for ReRed (2019), a cover album of Taylor Swift's 2012 LP Red. Campbell sang "All Too Well" on the Something Merry compilation.

On February 12, 2021, Campbell released his debut solo single, "When I Face Into the Wind."

== Musical style ==
Much of Campbell's work references religion, specifically the Catholic Church. He attended Catholic school as a child, but was born to non-religious parents, describing his father as a "full-board atheist" and his mother as "a non-practicing Catholic who doesn't think about it much and doesn't go to church." Campbell is critical of organized religion, saying in a 2011 interview with Alternative Press, "To me, there is no flaw in believing in God. If you want to believe in God, that's fine. Where I find a flaw is in being a part of this church that's basing itself off this convoluted text where you can't know everything, and it can't be 100 percent."

== Personal life ==
Campbell and his wife have two children together.

== Discography ==
=== with The Wonder Years ===
Studio albums

- Get Stoked on It! (No Sleep, 2007)
- The Upsides (No Sleep, 2010)
- Suburbia I've Given You All and Now I'm Nothing (Hopeless, 2011)
- The Greatest Generation (Hopeless, 2013)
- No Closer to Heaven (Hopeless, 2015)
- Sister Cities (Hopeless/Loneliest Place on Earth, 2018)
- The Hum Goes on Forever (Hopeless/Loneliest Place on Earth, 2022)

Compilation albums

- I Refuse to Sink: A Collection of Prior Recordings (No Sleep, 2009)
- Sleeping on Trash: A Collection of Songs Recorded 2005-2010 (NO Sleep, 2013)

Extended plays

- The Wonder Years / Emergency and I split EP (2005)
- Bangarang! / The Wonder Years split EP (Forgive & Forget, 2006)
- 2007 Tour EP (No Sleep, 2007)
- Won't Be Pathetic Forever (No Sleep, 2008)
- Get Stoked on It! Radio EP (No Sleep, 2009)
- 2009 5 Song Radio EP (No Sleep, 2009)
- Distances (split with All or Nothing) (No Sleep, 2009)
- Under the Influence, Vol. 13 (split with Fallen from the Sky) (Suburban Home, 2010)
- The Wonder Years vs. Heroes for Hire – A Split Record (Boomtown/Hopeless, 2010)
- Punk Is Dead. Get a Job. (split with Stay Ahead of the Weather) (Hopeless, 2012)
- Manton Street (Run for Cover, 2013)
- (Sort Of) A Song for Patsy Cline / It's (Sort Of) a Pleasure to Meet You (split with Motion City Soundtrack) (Hopeless, 2015)
- Burst & Decay (An Acoustic EP) (Hopeless/Loneliest Place on Earth, 2017)
- Burst & Decay (Volume II) (Hopeless/Loneliest Place on Earth, 2020)

Other appearances

- "Christmas at 22," on No Sleep 'Till Christmas (2008)
- Cheap Shots, Youth Anthems (Kid Dynamite cover), on Carry the Torch: A Tribute to Kid Dynamite (2009)
- "Hey Julie" (Fountains of Wayne cover), on Vs. the Earthquake (2011)
- "Aside" (The Weakerthans cover), on Take Action Volume 10 (2011)
- "Cooking Wine" (Alkaline Trio cover), on A3T: A Tribute to Alkaline Trio (2011)
- "Anchor" (Into It. Over It. cover), on The Glamour Kills Tour Compilation (2012)
- "Living Room Song," on A Comp for Mom (2014)

=== with Aaron West and the Roaring Twenties ===
Studio albums

- We Don't Have Each Other (Hopeless, 2014)
- Routine Maintenance (Hopeless, 2019)
- "In Lieu of Flowers" (Hopeless, 2024)

Extended plays

- Bittersweet (Hopeless, 2016)

Live albums

- Live From Asbury Park (Hopeless, 2020)

Non-album singles

- "Orchard Park" (2017)

=== with Clear Eyes Fanzine ===
Extended plays

- Season One, Episodes 1-6 (Loneliest Place on Earth, 2019)

=== Solo ===
Non-album singles

- "When I Face into the Wind" (Loneliest Place on Earth, 2021)
- "Flight No. 5" (Loneliest Place on Earth, 2021)
- "In Love in Various Rooms" (Loneliest Place on Earth, 2021)

Albums

- "Other People's Lives" (Loneliest Place on Earth, 2021)

As featured artist

- "Growing Up is Killing Me" by Veara, Growing Up Is Killing Me (Epitaph, 2013)
- "The Dope Beat" by Letlive, The Blackest Beautiful (Renditions) (Epitaph, 2013)
- "Confinement" by rationale. feat. Mike Kennedy, Confines Acoustic EP (Rationale., 2016)
- "Feel a Thing - Acoustic" by Meet Me @ The Altar (Fueled by Ramen, 2021)
- "Team Sports," on Self Help (2022)
- "Let The Blaze Light Our Way" by Cubfires, ...Is An Evolving Mess (Guerrilla Records, 2023)

Compilations

- "Broom People" (the Mountain Goats cover) with Ace Enders, Songs That Saved My Life (Hopeless, 2018)
- "All Too Well" (Taylor Swift cover), ReRed (Something Merry, 2019)
