= Spanish Love Songs =

American rock band

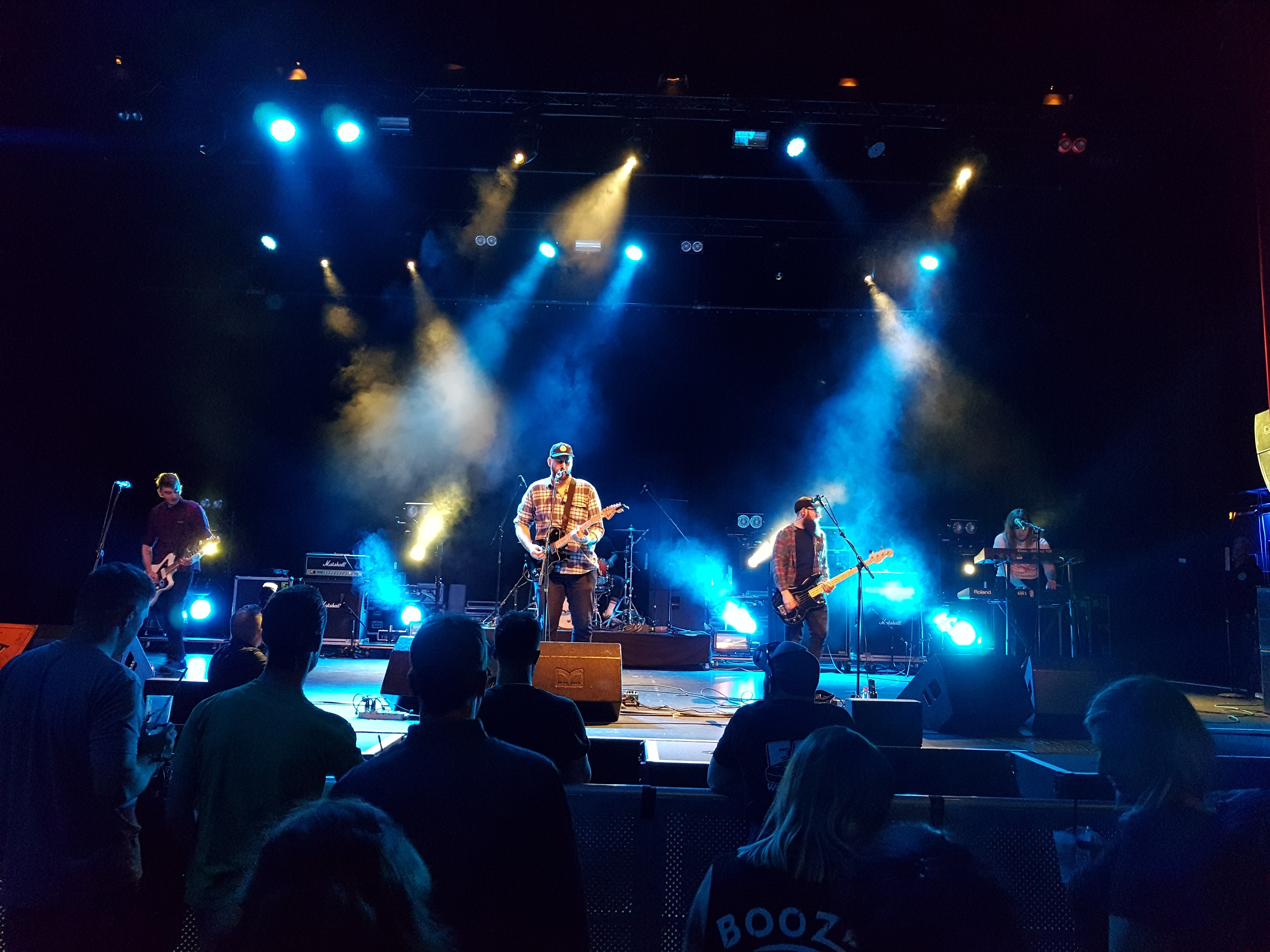
- Spanish Love Songs performing in 2019

Background information
- Origin: Los Angeles, California, U.S.
- Genres: Punk rock; emo; pop-punk; indie rock; pop rock
- Years active: 2013–present
- Labels: Pure Noise; Wiretap; A-F
- Members: Dylan Slocum; Kyle McAulay; Ruben Duarte; Mike Trujillo; Meredith Van Woert
- Past members: Gabe Mayeshiro; Trevor Dietrich
- Website: spanishlovesongs.com

Spanish Love Songs is an American rock band from Los Angeles, California, that was founded in 2013. The band consists of lead vocalist and guitarist Dylan Slocum, guitarist Kyle McAulay, drummer Ruben Duarte, bass guitarist Mike Trujillo, and keyboardist/acoustic guitar player Meredith Van Woert. Slocum and Van Woert are married. Since their formation, Spanish Love Songs has released five studio albums: Giant Sings the Blues (2015), Schmaltz (2018), Brave Faces Everyone (2020), No Joy (2023), and Future Nausea (2026).

== History ==
=== 2013–2019: Formation and early releases ===
Spanish Love Songs was originally formed as a trio by Slocum, Mayeshiro, and Duarte. McAulay joined shortly after, making them a four-piece. The band played their first show in August 2013. They began recording their debut EP, which later became their debut studio album. The band released their debut studio album in March 2015 titled Giant Sings the Blues. The album was released through their own label. In 2016, the band signed with Wiretap Records and rereleased their debut album with bonus tracks. On October 24, 2016, the band released Little Giants, a collection of B-sides from Giant Sings the Blues. In 2017, keyboardist Meredith Van Woert joined the band, making them a five-piece. In 2018, the band released their second studio album, Schmaltz. On November 30, 2018, the band released a cover of "Funeral" by Phoebe Bridgers.

=== 2020-2022: Brave Faces Everyone and Brave Faces Etc ===
In 2020, Spanish Love Songs released their third studio album titled Brave Faces Everyone. The album debuted at No. 21 on Vinyl Albums chart and No. 61 on the Top Album Sales chart with 2000 copies sold. Along with the album, the band announced a tour in the U.K. with the Menzingers and a U.S. tour with the Wonder Years. The tour started on January 25, 2020. On July 14, 2021, the band released "Phantom Limb", a track from the Brave Faces Everyone sessions, along with a cover of "Blacking Out the Friction" by Death Cab for Cutie. On October 28, 2021, the band released a cover of "I Miss You" by Blink-182. On February 1, 2022, the band announced Brave Faces, Etc., a complete reimagining of Brave Faces Everyone, along with the release of the lead singles, new versions of "Generation Loss" and "Optimism (As a Radical Life Choice)". Three additional singles appeared on digital platforms in the weeks leading into the album’s release on April 15.

On August 4, 2022, the band released a cover of "We’ve Had Enough" by Alkaline Trio, as part of a compilation album for their label, Pure Noise Records.

=== 2023–2025: No Joy and A Brief Intermission in the Flattening of Time ===
Beginning on March 8, 2023, the band began digitally releasing a series of cover songs, which, on April 25, was packaged as the Doom & Gloom Sessions. Its four songs were originally performed (respectively) by The Killers, Rilo Kiley, Jimmy Eat World, and Grandaddy.

On May 17, the band released a music video for "Haunted", the lead single from their fourth studio album, No Joy, itself released on August 25, 2023.

On October 9, 2025, the band released the singles "Cocaine and Lexapro" which featured Kevin Devine and "Berlin" featuring Tigers Jaw for the EP "A Brief Intermission in the Flattening of Time" which released on November 21, 2025. A third single was released on October 23, 2025, "Heavenhead" which featured illuminati hotties. With the release of the EP on November 21, 2025, came a fourth song "Lifers Too" which featured Dan Campbell of The Wonder Years. While the digital release features the four songs, the physical release also included the reimagining of five songs from the No Joy Sessions, along with the Doom and Gloom Sessions.

=== 2026: Future Nausea ===
On September 3, 2026, the band announced their fifth full-length album, Future Nausea, with a release date of November 6, 2026, and released the lead single, "Good American". On September 10, 2026, the band announced The Co$t of Living Tour to support the album. On September 29, 2026, the band released another single and music video, "Doom Tripping". On October 22, 2026, the band released the third single and video, "Welcome to Hell".

== Musical style ==
Spanish Love Songs' musical style has been described as punk rock, emo, pop-punk, indie rock, pop rock, alternative rock, garage punk, and indie punk. The band calls themselves "grouchrock". Rich Wilson of AllMusic considers the band to be "[a continuation of] the emotional punk tradition started by bands such as Jawbreaker and Hot Water Music."

== Band members ==
Current members Source:

- Dylan Slocum – lead vocals, rhythm guitar (2013–present), lead guitar (2013)
- Kyle McAulay – lead guitar, backing vocals (2013–present)
- Ruben Duarte – drums, percussion (2013–present)
- Meredith Van Woert – keyboards, acoustic guitar (2017–present)
- Mike Trujillo - bass, backing vocals (2025–present)

Former members

- Gabe Mayeshiro – bass (2013–2016)
- Trevor Dietrich – bass, backing vocals (2017–2025)

== Discography ==
=== Studio albums ===
| Title | Album details |
|---|---|
| Giant Sings the Blues | Released: March 25, 2015; Length: 38:07; Label: Wiretap; Track listing: 1. "Bad Day" – 1:35; 2. "Nervous People" – 4:33; 3. "Concrete" – 3:15; 4. "Dying" – 2:58; 5. "Mexico" – 4:32; 6. "Vermont" – 3:37; 7. "Friends" – 4:12; 8. "Remained" – 4:21; 9. "Stranger" – 5:36; 10. "Bright Day" – 3:27 |
| Schmaltz | Released: March 30, 2018; Length: 39:25; Label: A-F; Track listing: 1. "Nuevo" – 2:10; 2. "Sequels, Remakes, & Adaptations" – 1:56; 3. "Bellyache" – 4:29; 4. "Buffalo Buffalo" – 3:52; 5. "Otis / Carl" – 3:48; 6. "The Boy Considers His Haircut" – 3:56; 7. "El Niño Considers His Failures" – 3:12; 8. "Joana, in Five Acts" – 3:48; 9. "Beer & Nyquil (Hold It Together)" – 3:02; 10. "It's Not Interesting" – 4:28; 11. "Aloha to No One" – 4:33 |
| Brave Faces Everyone | Released: February 7, 2020; Genres: Pop-punk, punk rock; Length: 40:28; Label: Pure Noise; Track listing: 1. "Routine Pain" – 4:23; 2. "Self-Destruction (as a Sensible Career Choice)" – 2:59; 3. "Generation Loss" – 4:26; 4. "Kick" – 4:02; 5. "Beach Front Property" – 4:07; 6. "Losers" – 4:25; 7. "Optimism (as a Radical Life Choice)" – 4:26; 8. "Losers 2" – 4:03; 9. "Dolores" – 3:11; 10. "Brave Faces, Everyone" – 4:26 |
| Brave Faces, Etc. | Released: April 15, 2022; Genres: Emo, electronic; Length: 43:49; Label: Pure Noise; Track listing: 1. "Routine Pain" (Etc Version) – 4:46; 2. "Self-Destruction (as a Sensible Career Choice)" (Etc Version) – 2:44; 3. "Generation Loss" (Etc Version) – 5:19; 4. "Kick" (Etc Version) – 4:52; 5. "Beach Front Property" (Etc Version) – 4:47; 6. "Losers" (Etc Version) – 4:13; 7. "Optimism (as a Radical Life Choice)" (Etc Version) – 4:32; 8. "Losers 2" (Etc Version) – 4:30; 9. "Dolores" (Etc Version) – 2:47; 10. "Brave Faces, Everyone" (Etc Version) – 5:14 |
| No Joy | Released: August 25, 2023; Genres: Pop-punk, punk rock; Length: 45:11; Label: Pure Noise; Track listing: 1. "Lifers" – 3:34; 2. "Pendulum" – 3:34; 3. "Haunted" – 3:43; 4. "Clean-Up Crew" – 3:58; 5. "Middle of Nine" – 3:49; 6. "Marvel" – 3:35; 7. "I'm Gonna Miss Everything" – 3:21; 8. "Rapture Chaser" – 3:35; 9. "Mutable" – 3:16; 10. "Here You Are" – 3:08; 11. "Exit Bags" – 4:00; 12. "Re-Emerging Signs of the Apocalypse" – 5:32 |
| Future Nausea | Released: November 7, 2026; Length: 46:05; Label: Pure Noise; Track listing: 1. "Future Nausea" – 3:52; 2. "Good American" – 3:53; 3. "Welcome to Hell" – 4:02; 4. "New Fears" – 3:37; 5. "Living Blues" – 4:17; 6. "Jan666" – 2:02; 7. "Doom Tripping" – 4:13; 8. "Shadowland" – 3:56; 9. "No Dreams" – 3:49; 10. "Future Nausea Pt. 2" – 4:07; 11. "See You on the Way Out" – 4:25; 12. "Until the Sun Explodes" – 3:52 |

=== Extended plays ===
| Title | EP details |
|---|---|
| Doom and Gloom Sessions | Released: April 25, 2023; Labels: Pure Noise; Length: 17:27; Track listing: 1. "Smile Like You Mean It" (originally by The Killers) – 4:04; 2. "Portions for Foxes" (originally by Rilo Kiley) – 4:45; 3. "Futures" (originally by Jimmy Eat World) – 4:10; 4. "Now It's On" (originally by Grandaddy) – 4:27 |
| A Brief Intermission in the Flattening of Time | Released: November 21, 2025; Labels: Pure Noise; Length: 13:40; Track listing: 1. "Lifers Too" (featuring Dan Campbell of The Wonder Years) - 3:47; 2. "Cocaine & Lexapro" (featuring Kevin Devine) – 3:13; 3. "Heavenhead" (featuring illuminati hotties) – 3:33; 4. "Berlin" (featuring Tigers Jaw) – 3:06 |
