= Sleeping on Trash: A Collection of Songs Recorded 2005–2010 =

Compilation album by The Wonder Years
- Released: February 11, 2013
- Recorded: 2005–10
- Genre: Pop punk
- Length: 52:28
- Label: No Sleep
- Producer: Various

The Wonder Years chronology
| Suburbia I've Given You All and Now I'm Nothing (2011) | Sleeping on Trash: A Collection of Songs Recorded 2005–2010 (2013) | The Greatest Generation (2013) |

Professional ratings
Review scores
| Source | Rating |
|---|---|
| Big Cheese | 4/5 |

Sleeping on Trash: A Collection of Songs Recorded 2005–2010 is a compilation album by American rock band The Wonder Years.

== Contents and release ==
The album is a compilation of all of The Wonder Years recordings prior to the release of The Upsides, with the exception of Get Stoked on It!. The compilation features 18 rare tracks, demos and cover songs. Vocalist Dan Campbell commented that the band "made it a priority to get music to listeners outside of [their albums]. Because of that, there are a lot of old tracks floating around from out-of-print 7 inches, CD-R demos or comps. Sleeping On Trash is a way [...] to get all of it on just one record. It’s a tangible way to own our old material without having to pay out the nose for it on eBay."

On November 27, 2012 Sleeping on Trash was announced for release. On February 8, 2013, the album was made available for streaming. On February 12, the album was released through No Sleep.

== Track listing ==
All tracks are written by The Wonder Years.

| No. | Title | Originally appeared on | Length |
|---|---|---|---|
| 1. | "Mike Kennedy Is a Bad Friend" | Won't Be Pathetic Forever (2008) | 1:15 |
| 2. | "Solo & Chewy: Holdin' It Down" | Won't Be Pathetic Forever | 3:14 |
| 3. | "Won't Be Pathetic Forever" | Won't Be Pathetic Forever | 3:00 |
| 4. | "You're Not Salinger. Get Over It." | Won't Be Pathetic Forever | 3:43 |
| 5. | "An Elegy for Baby Blue" | Distances (2009) (split with All or Nothing) | 2:25 |
| 6. | "Don't Open the Fridge!" | Distances (split with All or Nothing) | 2:57 |
| 7. | "Christmas at 22" | No Sleep 'Till Christmas (2008) | 2:37 |
| 8. | "Leavenhouse. 11:30." | "Leavenhouse. 11:30." (2010) | 2:12 |
| 9. | "My Geraldine Lies Over the Delaware" (split version) | split with Bangarang (2006) | 2:30 |
| 10. | "I Ain't Saying He a Gold Digga (Sike!)" | split with Bangarang | 3:24 |
| 11. | "Let's Moshercise!!!" (split version) | split with Bangarang | 2:33 |
| 12. | "Through Two Hearts" | split with Bangarang | 5:07 |
| 13. | "Cheap Shots, Youth Anthems" (Kid Dynamite cover) | Carry the Torch: A Tribute to Kid Dynamite (2009) | 2:01 |
| 14. | "Zip Lock" (Lit cover) | Under the Influence Vol. 13 (2009) (split with Fallen from the Sky) | 3:22 |
| 15. | "Hey Julie" (Fountains of Wayne cover) | Vs. the Earthquake (2011) | 2:45 |
| 16. | "Buzz Aldrin: The Poster Boy for Second Place" (demo) | split with Emergency and I (2005) | 2:52 |
| 17. | "Cowboy Killers" | split with Emergency and I | 2:38 |
| 18. | "I Fell in Love with a Ninja Master" (demo) | split with Emergency and I | 3:15 |

== Chart performance ==
| Chart (2013) | Peak position |
|---|---|
| U.S. Billboard Independent Albums | 46 |
