= The Hum Goes on Forever =

Studio album by the Wonder Years
- Released: September 23, 2022
- Studio: The Omen Room; Studio 606; Studio 4
- Genre: Alternative rock; emo; pop punk
- Length: 44:37
- Label: The Loneliest Place on Earth; Hopeless
- Producer: Steve Evetts; Will Yip

The Wonder Years chronology
Sister Cities (2018)	The Hum Goes on Forever (2022)

Singles from The Hum Goes on Forever
- 1. "Oldest Daughter" Released: April 21, 2022; 2. "Summer Clothes" Released: May 19, 2022; 3. "Wyatt's Song (Your Name)" Released: June 22, 2022; 4. "Low Tide" Released: July 27, 2022; 5. "Old Friends Like Lost Teeth" Released: August 31, 2022

The Hum Goes on Forever is the seventh studio album by American rock band the Wonder Years. It was released on September 23, 2022, by the Loneliest Place on Earth and Hopeless Records.

== Style and composition ==
The band originally planned to begin writing their next album after the conclusion of their 2020 tour, but the COVID-19 pandemic meant that they did not see each other for several months. They struggled to write virtually, and the record was not created until the band quarantined in a Pennsylvania farmhouse for a week. Many songs on The Hum Goes On Forever reference previous tracks from the Wonder Years' discography: the protagonist of "Oldest Daughter" is named after the titular character in "Madelyn" from The Greatest Generation, while "Cardinals II" is a sequel to the track on No Closer to Heaven.

== Recording and production ==
Steve Evetts, who frequently collaborated with the Wonder Years, produced most of the album, while Will Yip also produced certain tracks, which were initially intended for a standalone EP preceding the album. During production, the band decided to combine the results of both sessions. The recording took place at The Omen Room, Studio 606 and Studio 4.

== Release and promotion ==
On April 21, 2022, the Wonder Years released "Oldest Daughter", their first single since Sister Cities was released four years prior to that and the lead single for a then-untitled album. On May 19, they released "Summer Clothes" as a follow-up single. On June 22, the band announced that The Hum Goes on Forever would be released on September 23 through Hopeless Records. Accompanying the album announcement, which included cover art and a track listing, they released the single "Wyatt's Song (Your Name)".

In October 2022, the Wonder Years headlined a small East Coast tour to promote The Hum Goes On Forever. They were supported by Fireworks and Macseal.

== Critical reception ==
Professional ratings
Aggregate scores
Source	Rating
Metacritic	80/100
Review scores
Source	Rating
Exclaim!	8/10
Kerrang!	4/5
Pitchfork	7.3/10
Sputnikmusic	3.9/5

The Hum Goes on Forever was met with "generally favorable" reviews from critics. At Metacritic, which assigns a weighted average rating out of 100 to reviews from mainstream publications, this release received an average score of 80, based on 4 reviews.

== Track listing ==
All lyrics are written by Dan Campbell; all music is composed by The Wonder Years, except where noted.

No.	Title	Writer(s)	Length
1.	"Doors I Painted Shut"		3:00
2.	"Wyatt's Song (Your Name)"	The Wonder Years; Mark Hoppus	3:45
3.	"Oldest Daughter"	The Wonder Years; Ace Enders	3:19
4.	"Cardinals II"		4:12
5.	"The Paris of Nowhere"		3:30
6.	"Summer Clothes"		4:00
7.	"Lost It in the Lights"		3:53
8.	"Songs About Death"		3:21
9.	"Low Tide"		3:37
10.	"Laura & the Beehive"		4:04
11.	"Old Friends Like Lost Teeth"		3:14
12.	"You're the Reason I Don't Want the World to End"		4:37
Total length:			44:37

== Personnel ==
The Wonder Years

- Matt Brasch – rhythm guitar, vocals
- Dan Campbell – lead vocals
- Casey Cavaliere – lead guitar
- Mike Kennedy – drums
- Josh Martin – bass, vocals
- Nick Steinborn – guitar, keyboards

Technical

- Steve Evetts – production (1–4, 8–12)
- Will Yip – production (5–7)
- Andy Clarke – engineer (1–4, 8–12)
- Vince Ratti – mixing
- Ryan Smith – mastering
- Oliver Roman – additional engineering (1–4, 8–12)
- Evan Myaskovsky – additional engineering (1–4, 8–12)
- Jerred Polacci – additional engineering (1–4, 8–12)
- Justin Bartlett – additional engineering (5–7)
- Jordan Ly – additional engineering (5–7)
- John Carpineta – additional engineering (5–7)

== Charts ==
Chart performance for The Hum Goes on Forever
Chart (2022)	Peak position
Australian Digital Albums (ARIA)	29
Australian Physical Albums (ARIA)	53
Scottish Albums (OCC)	48
UK Album Downloads (OCC)	34
UK Independent Albums (OCC)	17
