= Orchard Park (song) =

Single by Aaron West and the Roaring Twenties
- Released: October 5, 2017
- Recorded: 2017
- Genre: Folk rock, indie rock, emo
- Length: 4:07
- Label: Loneliest Place On Earth
- Songwriter(s): Dan "Soupy" Campbell

Aaron West and the Roaring Twenties singles chronology
"Bittersweet" (2016)	"Orchard Park" (2017)	"Routine Maintenance" (2019)

"Orchard Park" is the first non-album single from American folk rock project Aaron West and the Roaring Twenties, released on October 5, 2017, through Loneliest Place on Earth.

== Background ==
On October 3, 2017, the Aaron West Twitter announced that a new song was imminent. On October 5, 2017, "Orchard Park" was made available for purchase as a Flexi single, with 450 copies being sold online and 550 being sold on tour. The online copies sold out the same day, and the song was made available to stream on October 6, 2017. Along with the tracks from Bittersweet, the song was originally written for a second LP, but was released on its own because Dan Campbell was too busy to make an entire Aaron West album. Because the song depicts Aaron and his mother spreading his father's ashes in Orchard Park, some have thought the song takes place before We Don't Have Each Other, but Campbell has stated that the song takes place in late May or early June 2014, after the events of Bittersweet. The song is the first Aaron West release on Loneliest Place On Earth, The Wonder Years' self-made label.

== Track listing ==
No.	Title	Length
1.	"Orchard Park"	4:07

== Personnel ==
Aaron West and the Roaring Twenties

- Dan "Soupy" Campbell – Vocals, Guitar, Writing

Additional musicians

- Sean Mackin – Violin, Mandolin
- Mike Kelley – Accordion

Production

- Arthur "Ace" Enders – Producer
- Nik Bruzzese – Producer
