= No Closer to Heaven =

Studio album by the Wonder Years
- Released: September 4, 2015
- Recorded: March–April 2015
- Studio: The Omen Room
- Genre: Alternative rock; pop punk; emo
- Length: 45:16
- Label: Hopeless
- Producer: Steve Evetts

The Wonder Years chronology
The Greatest Generation (2013)	No Closer to Heaven (2015)	Sister Cities (2018)

Singles from No Closer to Heaven
- 1. "Cardinals" Released: June 30, 2015; 2. "Cigarettes & Saints" Released: July 31, 2015; 3. "I Don't Like Who I Was Then" Released: August 21, 2015

No Closer to Heaven is the fifth studio album by American rock band the Wonder Years. Struggling with writer's block, vocalist Daniel Campbell spoke with several friends who were in bands for inspiration. No Closer to Heaven is a concept album, detailing the loss of a loved one. The album was recorded between March and April 2015. It was produced by Steve Evetts at The Omen Room. "Cardinals" was released as a single in June, followed by "Cigarettes & Saints" a month later. "I Don't Like Who I Was Then" was made available for streaming in August. "Thanks for the Ride" was made available for streaming in early September. No Closer to Heaven was released through Hopeless on September 4. The Target edition featured two additional tracks.

== Background ==
Between 2010 and 2013, the Wonder Years released a trilogy of albums (The Upsides [2010], Suburbia I've Given You All and Now I'm Nothing [2011] and The Greatest Generation [2013]) that dealt with vocalist Daniel Campbell's struggles of being scared, loneliness and feeling lost. These albums helped increase the band's popularity, "cementing themselves as [pop punk]'s leading force", according to Alternative Press reviewer Evan Lucy. In spring 2014 the band went on The Greatest Generation World Tour. In May, Campbell announced a solo project, Aaron West and the Roaring Twenties. With this project, Campbell pushed himself "to make a piece of fiction feel just as raw and personal as songs about my life". An album, We Don't Have Each Other, was released in July. Campbell performed on a few dates of the 2014 edition of Warped Tour. In February 2015, the group played three celebratory shows where they played the trilogy of albums in their entirety.

== Composition ==
I was like, 'We're over. The band's over and I've let everyone down and it's my fucking fault and my best friends who are relying on me to write lyrics – I've failed them all. I've failed everybody and I am the fucking worst.' I'd just lay around depressed.

– Daniel Campbell, about his writer's block, 2015

On September 2, 2014, Campbell posted a photo with caption "Since our last practice spot was condemned by the board of health, we'll be writing our next record in this new luxurious practice space". On November 13, the band began writing material for their next album. Campbell later revealed that he suffered chronic writer's block while coming up with new ideas. He would frequently sit in his girlfriend's apartment, walk to a coffee shop, and sit by a riverside – all of which failing to inspire him. Campbell frequently hit his notebook in frustration. By January 2015 Campbell started feeling depressed, then started panicking, which turned to rage. Instead of giving up, Campbell started talking to the lyricists from both Fireworks and Hostage Calm, Ace Enders of The Early November, and Jason Aalon Butler of letlive. These conversations helped Campbell rebuild his confidence.

About the album's title, Campbell explained: "I was at this turning point with the [new] record where I was like, "I don't want to write about the suburban American experience anymore [...]" I was thinking about other things in life [...] It started to feel like I was in a footrace with an expanding universe, and I was never going to get to the finish line." No Closer to Heaven is a concept album, detailing the loss of a loved one. Asked how this album is different compared to their previous output, Campbell replied: "We want to make something new. We just tried to push out in every direction. It's a little bit softer, it's a little bit louder, it's a little bit faster, it's a little bit slower. It moves out every way." All the songs were written by The Wonder Years at The Nightmare Factory. Campbell wrote all the lyrics in, according to the album booklet, "his bedroom and various coffee shops or parks." Jason Aalon Butler provided additional lyrics for "Stained Glass Ceilings" while in the break room at the studio. In "Cardinals", Campbell expresses grief about himself "being too self-involved to see when someone you love needs your help." "Thanks for the Ride" was written about Campbell's deceased friend who he ponders what her life would be like if she had lived. Campbell explained that he attempted to write a verse "if [a person] had come out of the coma [scenario]".

== Recording ==
On March 13, 2015 the band entered pre-production for a new album. On April 19, the band announced they had finished recording. The album was produced and engineered by Steve Evetts at The Omen Room. Additional engineering was performed by Allan Hessler. Jason Aalon Butler of letlive. provides additional vocals on "Stained Glass Ceilings". Campbell claimed Butler's "voice was absolutely perfect for it." Additional group vocals were provided by Allison Weiss, Charlie Saxton, Brett Jones, Joanna Katcher, Natalie Schaffer and Dave Summers. Evetts played a Rhodes piano on "No Closer to Heaven". Mixing was performed by Phil Nicolo at Studio 4, while Alan Douches mastered the album at West West Side Music.

== Release ==
On June 29, 2015 The Wonder Years announced No Closer to Heaven, and the track listing and cover art was revealed. The artwork was illustrated by Michael Cortada. When people pre-ordered the album they prompted to select one of four charities that the band would then donate to. A day later, "Cardinals" was made available for streaming and a music video was released. The video was directed by Kevin Slack. The video features Campbell carrying an unconscious friend down a street. The song was also released as a single. When Campbell gets to the middle of the road, an ambulance is seen situated in front of him. As Campbell moves closer to it, the ambulance pulls away. The rest of the band members have cameos in the video. The band played on the 2015 edition of Warped Tour. On July 31, the band released a music video for "Cigarettes & Saints", which was directed by Jeremi Mattern of Driver Friendly. The video features a teenage girl apparently writing a suicide note. The girl proceeds to pick up her bag and venture into a forest. She puts giant stones in her bag and proceeds to walk up a hill. At first, she contemplates jumping in a river, before throwing the bag and then jumping after it. On the same day, the song was released as a single. On August 20, "I Don't Like Who I Was Then" was made available for streaming via Alternative Press.

To help promote the release, the band performed a series of in-store acoustic shows between late August and early September. On September 3, "Thanks for the Ride" was made available for streaming via Spin. The following day, No Closer to Heaven was released through Hopeless Records. The Target edition includes a new song, "Slow Dancing with San Andreas" and an alternative version of "Palm Reader". The band went on a headlining fall tour in October and November with support from Motion City Soundtrack, State Champs, and You Blew It!. To promote the tour, a 7" vinyl was released. It featured Campbell and Justin Pierre of Motion City Soundtrack having traded instrumental tracks of songs from each bands' latest albums and wrote their own lyrics over them. The band supported Enter Shikari on their tour of the UK in February 2016. On March 2, a music video was released for "Stained Glass Ceilings". It was directed by Mattern and shot in the group's hometown, Philadelphia, Pennsylvania. In March and April, the group went on a headlining US tour with support from letlive., Tiny Moving Parts and Microwave. In October and November, the group went on a headlining US tour with support from Real Friends, Knuckle Puck, Seaway and Moose Blood.

== Reception ==
Professional ratings
Aggregate scores
Source	Rating
Metacritic	91/100
Review scores
Source	Rating
AbsolutePunk	9.5/10
AllMusic	4/5 stars
Alternative Press	4.5/5 stars
Clash	7/10
Exclaim!	6/10
Punknews.org	4/5 stars

No Closer to Heaven has received universal acclaim from music critics. At Metacritic, which assigns a "weighted average" rating out of 100 from selected independent ratings and reviews from mainstream critics, the album received a Metascore of 91/100, based on 6 reviews, indicating "universal acclaim". Prior to the album's release, Fuse.tv included the album as one of their "35 Most Anticipated Fall 2015 Albums". The album was included at number 11 on Rock Sound's top 50 releases of 2015 list. The album was ranked at number 8 on AbsolutePunk's top albums of 2015 list. "Cardinals" was included on Alternative Press's "10 Songs You Need To Hear From June 2015" list. The video for "Cardinals" was included on Alternative Press's "The Best Music Videos of 2015 so far" list. "Cardinals" was nominated for Best Music Video at the 2016 Alternative Press Music Awards.

No Closer to Heaven sold 22,144 copies in the first week, making it the largest first-week sales of their career. It charted at number 12 in the U.S., number 46 in the UK and number 59 in Australia.

Loudwire called "I Don't Like Who I Was Back Then" the best emo track of 2015.

== Track listing ==
All songs written by The Wonder Years, all lyrics written by Daniel Campbell.

=== Original release ===
No.	Title	Length
1.	"Brothers &"	1:31
2.	"Cardinals"	3:14
3.	"A Song for Patsy Cline"	3:52
4.	"I Don't Like Who I Was Then"	3:37
5.	"Cigarettes & Saints"	5:02
6.	"The Bluest Things on Earth"	3:10
7.	"A Song for Ernest Hemingway"	2:51
8.	"Thanks for the Ride"	3:31
9.	"Stained Glass Ceilings" (featuring Jason Aalon Butler)	4:45
10.	"I Wanted So Badly to Be Brave"	3:46
11.	"You in January"	3:14
12.	"Palm Reader"	4:14
13.	"No Closer to Heaven"	2:22

=== Target bonus tracks ===
No.	Title	Length
14.	"Slow Dancing with San Andreas"	3:44
15.	"Palm Reader" (alternate version)	3:56

== Personnel ==
Personnel per booklet.

The Wonder Years

- Matthew Brasch – rhythm guitar, vocals
- Daniel Campbell – lead vocals
- Casey Cavaliere – lead guitar, vocals
- Michael Kennedy – drums, percussion
- Joshua Martin – bass, vocals
- Nicholas Steinborn – guitar, keyboards, vocals

Additional musicians

- Jason Aalon Butler of letlive. – additional vocals on "Stained Glass Ceilings"
- Allison Weiss, Charlie Saxton, Brett Jones, Joanna Katcher, Natalie Schaffer, Dave Summers – additional group vocals
- Steve Evetts – Rhodes on "No Closer to Heaven"

Production

- Steve Evetts – producer, engineer
- Allan Hessler – additional engineering
- Phil Nicolo – mixing
- Alan Douches – mastering
- Michael Cortada – illustration
- Megan Thompson – photograph
- Werewolf Girlfriend – layout

== Chart performance ==
Chart (2015)	Peak position
Australian Albums (ARIA)	59
UK Albums (OCC)	46
US Billboard 200	12
US Billboard Vinyl Albums	1
