= Schematics (album) =

Studio album by Zolof the Rock & Roll Destroyer
- Released: September 25, 2007
- Recorded: 2007
- Genre: Indie rock, pop rock, indie pop
- Label: Le Pamplemousse; FlightPlan

Zolof the Rock & Roll Destroyer chronology
Duet All Night Long (2007)	Schematics (2007)

Professional ratings
Review scores
Source	Rating
Allmusic	link
AbsolutePunk	79% link

Schematics is the third studio album by the American pop rock band Zolof the Rock & Roll Destroyer. The album was released on September 25, 2007 through Le Pamplemousse Records (run by band member Rachel Minton) and FlightPlan Records.

== Track listing ==
No.	Title	Length
1.	"The Way It Goes"	2:23
2.	"Can’t Stand It"	2:49
3.	"Way Away"	2:25
4.	"Death or Radio"	3:19
5.	"This Briskness (Java)"	2:11
6.	"I Did It"	2:58
7.	"Secret Circuits"	2:26
8.	"The Moon and Mars"	3:12
9.	"I’m a Rock & Roll Mess"	2:18
10.	"So Scared"	3:11
