= Logan Circle =

Logan Circle may refer to:

- Logan Circle (Washington, D.C.), a traffic circle and neighborhood in Washington, D.C.
- Logan Circle (Philadelphia), a park in Philadelphia, Pennsylvania also known as Logan Square
- "Logan Circle", a song by The Wonder Years from The Upsides
