= Brave Faces Everyone =

2020 studio album by Spanish Love Songs

Studio album by Spanish Love Songs
- Released: February 7, 2020
- Studio: Hurley; West Valley
- Genre: Pop punk; punk rock
- Length: 40:25
- Label: Pure Noise
- Producer: Kyle McAulay

Spanish Love Songs chronology
Schmaltz (2018)	Brave Faces Everyone (2020)	Brave Faces, Etc. (2022)

Singles from Brave Faces Everyone
- 1. "Losers" Released: April 26, 2019; 2. "Kick" Released: January 6, 2020; 3. "Beachfront Property" Released: February 7, 2020

Brave Faces Everyone is the third studio album by American rock band Spanish Love Songs. It was released on February 7, 2020 under Pure Noise. The album was greeted with widespread acclaim by music critics, with a weighted score of 86 on review aggregator website Metacritic.

On April 15, 2022, a reimagining of Brave Faces Everyone, titled Brave Faces, Etc., was released. It featured alternate and more electronic versions of the songs from Brave Faces Everyone.

== Commercial performance ==
The album debuted at No. 21 on Vinyl Albums chart and No. 61 on the Top Album Sales chart with 2000 copies sold.

== Critical reception ==
Professional ratings
Aggregate scores
Source	Rating
Metacritic	86/100
Review scores
Source	Rating
Exclaim!	8/10
Kerrang!	4/5 stars
PopMatters	8/10
Sputnikmusic	5/5 stars

At Metacritic, which assigns a weighted average rating out of 100 to reviews from mainstream publications, this release received an average score of 86, based on 5 reviews.

== Track listing ==
All lyrics are written by Dylan Slocum; all music is composed by Spanish Love Songs.

Brave Faces Everyone track listing
No.	Title	Length
1.	"Routine Pain"	4:23
2.	"Self-Destruction (As a Sensible Career Choice)"	2:59
3.	"Generation Loss"	4:26
4.	"Kick"	4:02
5.	"Beachfront Property"	4:07
6.	"Losers"	4:25
7.	"Optimism (As a Radical Life Choice)"	4:25
8.	"Losers 2"	4:02
9.	"Dolores"	3:10
10.	"Brave Faces, Everyone"	4:26
Total length:		40:25

== Personnel ==
Credits adapted from the album's liner notes.

=== Spanish Love Songs ===
- Trevor Dietrich – bass, guitar, backing vocals, additional production, engineering
- Ruben Duarte – drums, percussion
- Kyle McAulay – guitar, keyboards, production, engineering
- Meredith Van Woert – piano, organ, synthesizers
- Dylan Slocum – vocals, guitar

=== Additional contributors ===
- Patrick Kehrier – additional engineering
- Vince Ratti – mixing
- Ryan Smith – mastering
- Mitchell Wojcik – cover photo
- Dylan Wachman – layout

== Charts ==
Chart performance for Brave Faces Everyone
Chart	Peak position
US Top Album Sales (Billboard)	61
