= Routine Maintenance (album) =

Studio album by Aaron West and the Roaring Twenties
- Released: May 10, 2019
- Recorded: 2018–2019
- Genre: Folk rock, indie rock, emo
- Length: 35:27
- Label: Hopeless Records, Loneliest Place On Earth
- Producer: Ace Enders

Aaron West and the Roaring Twenties chronology
Orchard Park (2017)	Routine Maintenance (2019)	In Lieu of Flowers (2024)

Singles from Routine Maintenance
- 1. "Runnin' Toward the Light" Released: March 28, 2019; 2. "Just Sign the Papers" Released: April 17, 2019; 3. "Bury Me Anywhere Else" Released: May 6, 2019

Routine Maintenance is the second full-length studio album by American folk rock project Aaron West and the Roaring Twenties. Released on May 10, 2019 via Hopeless Records, the album follows the concept begun with We Don't Have Each Other (2014).

== Background ==
In March 2019, Dan Campbell announced two Aaron West tours, as well as a new album. The announcement was accompanied by a brief teaser video, using home movie footage and instrumental music. Later that month, the project released a music video for the album's first single, "Runnin' Toward the Light." Two more singles, "Just Sign the Papers" and "Bury Me Anywhere Else," were released in advance of the full album's debut on May 10, 2019.

In an interview with Rock Sound, Campbell said, "There is a redemption arc built into this album. I really wanted to focus on Aaron growing as a person and understanding how to better cope with tragedy instead of just shutting down and being self-destructive and self-absorbed and self-obsessed."

== Reception ==
Routine Maintenance was released to critical acclaim. Sputnikmusic staffer Channing Freeman rated the album as 4.5 out of 5, declaring it "[m]ore than a side project and much more than a story."

Two Dead Press reviewers shortlisted the album for their list of the top ten albums of 2019.

Professional ratings
Review scores
Source	Rating
Sputnikmusic	4.5/5 stars
The Soundboard	8/10
Already Heard	4/5 stars
DEAD PRESS!	8/10 stars
The Alternative	Phenomenal
obsessxns	8.7/10

== Track listing ==
No.	Title	Length
1.	"Lead Paint & Salt Air"	3:58
2.	"Just Sign The Papers"	3:41
3.	"Bloodied Up in a Bar Fight"	4:07
4.	"Bury Me Anywhere Else"	3:01
5.	"Rosa & Reseda"	3:34
6.	"Wildflower Honey"	2:50
7.	"Runnin' Toward The Light"	3:01
8.	"God & The Billboards"	4:13
9.	"Winter Coats"	3:18
10.	"Routine Maintenance"	3:44
Total length:		35:27

== Credits and personnel ==
Aaron West and the Roaring Twenties

- Dan "Soupy" Campbell – vocals, guitar, keyboards, harmonica

Additional personnel

- Ace Enders – double bass, guitar, keyboards, banjo, lap steel guitar, additional vocals
- John Becker – guitar
- Nick Steinborn – drums
- Gabe Valle – violin
- Nate Sander – viola
- Kristine Kruta – cello
- Juan Lopez – trumpet
- Chiemena E. Ukazim – saxophone
- Dom Maggi, Joe Marro, Ryan Pinkowitz, Emma Wuillermin, Robin Wuillermin – additional vocals

Production

- Ace Enders – producer, engineer, mixing
- Nik Bruzzese, Dom Maggi – additional engineering
- Alan Douches – mastering
- Joe Marro, Lesser Matters – management
