= Rachel Minton =

American singer

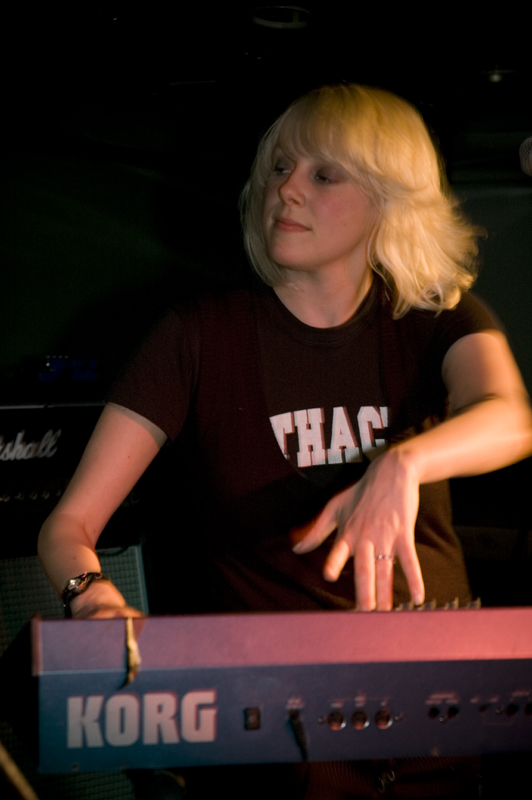
Minton on keyboard

Rachel Minton (born 1980) is the former lead vocalist and keyboardist for the Independent music/pop rock/power pop band Zolof the Rock and Roll Destroyer.

She has provided guest vocals on many other bands' works, including Circa Survive's song "Suitcase", which appears on their fourth album Violent Waves. Previously she took the guest spot on Valencia's album, We All Need A Reason To Believe, on the first single, "Where Did You Go?"; Philly/Pittsburgh electro-clash artist Pfunkt's "Anna Log"; and Motion City Soundtrack's Even If It Kills Me, on the tracks "It Had to Be You", "Hello Helicopter" and "Point of Extinction". She also contributed to Reel Big Fish's live DVD by singing the female parts on "She Has A Girlfriend Now". Minton was also featured as a guest singer on The Wonder Years' song "Zombies Are The New Black" from their full-length Get Stoked On It!; "Solo & Chewy: Holdin' It Down" from their EP Won't Be Pathetic Forever; and "Hey Thanks" from their album The Upsides. She was also featured on the track "Common Weather" by Citizen. In 2004, she also produced the album ''I Am A Robot, I Am Talking Like A Robot, I Am A Robot" by Kitty Kat Dirt Nap.
