= Zolof the Rock & Roll Destroyer (album) =

Studio album by Zolof the Rock & Roll Destroyer
- Released: 2002
- Genre: Pop punk, pop rock, indie rock
- Length: 22:45
- Label: Break Even Records

Zolof the Rock & Roll Destroyer chronology
Zolof the Rock & Roll Destroyer (2002)	Jalopy Go Far (2003)

Professional ratings
Review scores
Source	Rating
AllMusic	(not rated)

Zolof the Rock & Roll Destroyer is the debut album by pop rock band Zolof the Rock & Roll Destroyer. It was originally released by Break Even Records / Wonka Vision, but was later reissued by Law of Inertia / Reignition Records on August 10, 2004. The songs feature Anthony Green on vocals. Several of the tracks were re-recorded for their follow up album, Jalopy Go Far.

== Track listing ==
1. Moment
2. Plays Pretty for Baby
3. Ode to Madonna
4. Words for Now
5. Mean Old Coot
6. Mr. Song
7. Riding Trains in November
8. Simon
9. There's That One Person You Will Never Get Over No Matter How Long It's Been
