= The Popsicle =

The Popsicle EP

EP by Zolof the Rock & Roll Destroyer
- Released: November 16, 2004
- Recorded: The Skylight
- Genre: Indie rock, pop rock, indie pop
- Length: 13:47
- Label: Eyeball Records
- Producer: Rachel Minton, Vincent Ratti

Zolof the Rock & Roll Destroyer chronology
Jalopy Go Far (2003)	The Popsicle EP (2004)	Unicorns, Demos, B-Sides, And Rainbows (2005)

The Popsicle EP is the first EP and third major release by the "spunk rock" band Zolof the Rock & Roll Destroyer. Kenny Vasoli (of The Starting Line) performs guest vocals on "Argh... I'm a Pirate", while Anthony Green (of Circa Survive and Saosin) returns to perform additional vocals on "This Was All a Bad Idea".

== Track listing ==
1. "Argh...I'm a Pirate" – 1:52
2. "This Was All a Bad Idea" – 2:45
3. "Oh William" – 3:05
4. "Crazy = Cute" – 2:16
5. "Popsicle" – 3:54
