= No Joy (album) =

Studio album by Spanish Love Songs
- Released: August 25, 2023
- Recorded: August 2022
- Length: 45:11
- Label: Pure Noise
- Producers: Collin Pastore; Spanish Love Songs

Spanish Love Songs chronology
Doom and Gloom Sessions (2023)	No Joy (2023)	A Brief Intermission in the Flattening of Tine (2025)

No Joy is the fourth studio album by American pop punk band Spanish Love Songs. Produced by the band alongside Collin Pastore, it was released by Pure Noise Records on August 25, 2023.

== Reception ==
According to the review aggregator Metacritic, No Joy received "universal acclaim" based on a weighted average score of 89 out of 100 from four critic scores. In Exclaim!, Adam Feibel gave No Joy an 8 out of 10, calling it an album with "purpose" that has "more considered" music arrangements than Spanish Love Songs' previous work. Olly Thomas of Kerrang! scored this album a 4 out of 5, summing up that "if the message of No Joy is ultimately one of perseverance, it's fitting that this is an album which seems set to grant its creators a new lease of life". At Sputnikmusic, Atari rated this release a 5 out of 5, calling it a "classic" that has "subtle rays of optimism" to serve as "a warm contrast to the band's depressing lyricism, with conflicting emotions now in constant battle", continuing that "there's no other band out there that can write such hopeless lyrics while also managing to make me feel so alive".

== Track listing ==
All tracks are written by Spanish Love Songs.

1. "Lifers" – 3:34
2. "Pendulum" – 3:34
3. "Haunted" – 3:43
4. "Clean‐Up Crew" – 3:58
5. "Middle of Nine" – 3:49
6. "Marvel" – 3:35
7. "I'm Gonna Miss Everything" – 3:21
8. "Rapture Chaser" – 3:35
9. "Mutable" – 3:16
10. "Here You Are" – 3:08
11. "Exit Bags" – 4:00
12. "Re‐Emerging Signs of the Apocalypse" – 5:32

== Personnel ==
Credits adapted from the album's liner notes.

=== Spanish Love Songs ===
- Trevor Dietrich – bass guitar, guitar, synthesizers, vocals, engineering, production
- Ruben Duarte – drums, percussion, synthesizers, production
- Kyle McAulay – guitar, synthesizers, percussion, engineering, additional mix engineering, production
- Dylan Slocum – vocals, guitar, synthesizers, programming, drones, art direction, production
- Meredith Van Woert – synthesizers, keyboards, vocals, art direction, production

=== Additional personnel ===
- Carlos de la Garza – mixing
- Collin Pastore – synthesizers, keyboards, pedal steel, guitar, programming, engineering, production
- Nick Townsend – mastering
- Alec Wingfield – additional mix engineering
- Mitchell Wojcik – photography
- Bonnie Jean Deegan – cover model
- Dylan Wachman – layout, art direction

== See also ==
- 2023 in American music
- List of 2023 albums
