= Jalopy Go Far =

Studio album by Zolof the Rock & Roll Destroyer
- Released: May 6, 2003
- Genre: Pop punk, pop rock, indie rock
- Length: 21:52
- Label: Eyeball

Zolof the Rock & Roll Destroyer chronology
Zolof the Rock & Roll Destroyer (2002)	Jalopy Go Far (2003)	The Popsicle EP (2004)

Jalopy Go Far is the second release from the pop rock band, Zolof the Rock & Roll Destroyer. It was released in 2003. Several tracks appeared on the self-titled debut, but were re-recorded for this release. Additionally, "Plays Pretty for Baby" was re-recorded with different lyrics as "Super OK."

== Track listing ==
1. Mean Old Coot
2. Super OK
3. Moment
4. The Hot Situation
5. Wonderful Awkward
6. How Bout It
7. I Owe You
8. Don't Mope
9. Scream and Run
10. Running Starts Will Only Get You Faster to the Place That Will Make You Say Ouch
