= Bittersweet (Aaron West and the Roaring Twenties EP) =

EP by Aaron West and the Roaring Twenties
- Released: May 20, 2016
- Recorded: 2016
- Genre: Folk rock, indie rock, emo
- Length: 11:10
- Label: Hopeless Records

Aaron West and the Roaring Twenties chronology
We Don't Have Each Other (2014)	Bittersweet (2016)	Orchard Park (2017)

Bittersweet is the first EP from American folk rock project Aaron West and the Roaring Twenties, released on May 20, 2016, through Hopeless Records.

== Background ==
The EP was announced on March 25, 2016, with one song, "'67, Cherry Red", being made available for streaming. The release of the EP features vinyl pressings on three different colors, Green, Blue, and Red, attributing to the songs "Green Like the G Train, Green Like Sea Foam", "Goodbye, Carolina Blues", and "'67, Cherry Red" respectively.

Professional ratings
Review scores
Source	Rating
Sputnik Music	4.5/5 stars
Rock Sound	6/10

== Track listing ==
No.	Title	Length
1.	"67, Cherry Red"	3:38
2.	"Goodbye, Carolina Blues"	3:39
3.	"Green Like The G Train, Green Like The Sea Foam"	3:53
Total length:		11:10

== Personnel ==
Credits from Discogs.

Aaron West and the Roaring Twenties

- Dan "Soupy" Campbell – Vocals, Guitar, Writing, Layout

Additional musicians

- Arthur "Ace" Enders – Guitar, bass, lap steel guitar, banjo
- Dave Heck – Trombone
- Mike Kelley – Saxophone, clarinet
- Michael Kennedy – Drums
- Juan Lopez – Trumpet

Artwork

- Allison Weiss – Artwork (logo)
- Mitchell Wojcik – Photography

Production

- Arthur "Ace" Enders – Producer, Mixing
- Bill Henderson – Mastering
- Ryan Pinkowicz – Engineer
