= Get Stoked on It! =

Studio album by the Wonder Years
- Released: October 30, 2007
- Recorded: July–August 2007
- Genres: Easycore, pop punk
- Length: 32:38
- Label: No Sleep

The Wonder Years chronology
Get Stoked on It! (2007)	The Upsides (2010)

Get Stoked on It! is the debut studio album by American rock band the Wonder Years, released through No Sleep Records on October 30, 2007. The album features guest vocals from Rachel Minton (Zolof the Rock & Roll Destroyer), Bob Wilson (Letxdown), and Brooke Schwartz (CDC). No Sleep released a digital-only reissue of the album on May 15, 2012. The album was remixed, remastered and given a new cover. Commenting on the re-release, lead singer Dan Campbell described the original as a "train wreck", but said since the re-release had been paid for its release was "inevitable". He said about the album, "If you like the record, enjoy the new mixes. If you hate the record, I'm on your side."

== Reception ==
Professional ratings
Review scores
Source	Rating
AbsolutePunk	(85%)
Punknews.org	1.0/5 stars

The album was reviewed positively by AbsolutePunk, who awarded it a score of 85%, saying "They blend genres without playing favorites and are poised to win scores of new fans with Get Stoked On It!". Punknews.org was scathing in their 1-star review, saying "It's hard to get stoked about anything on Get Stoked on It!. The only thing I'm stoked on after listening to this album is jumping through a wood-chipper."

== Track listing ==
All tracks are written by The Wonder Years.

No.	Title	Length
1.	"Keystone State Dude-Core"	1:29
2.	"Bout to Get Fruit Punched, Homie"	2:31
3.	"Buzz Aldrin: The Poster Boy for Second Place"	2:51
4.	"Let's Moshercise!!!"	2:49
5.	""What If We [Swam] into Nothing?""	2:46
6.	"Racing Trains"	1:38
7.	"Zombies Are the New Black"	3:13
8.	"We Were Giants"	3:36
9.	"My Geraldine Lies Over the Delaware"	2:29
10.	"Dude, What Is a Land Pirate?"	3:21
11.	"I Fell in Love with a Ninja Master"	3:12
12.	"When Keeping It Real Goes Wrong"	2:48

== Personnel ==
=== Band ===
- Dan "Soupy" Campbell — vocals
- Josh Martin — bass, vocals
- Matt Brasch — rhythm guitar, vocals
- Casey Cavaliere — lead guitar, vocals
- Mikey Kelly — keyboards, vocals
- Michael Kennedy — drums
