= Aaron West and the Roaring Twenties =

American musical artist

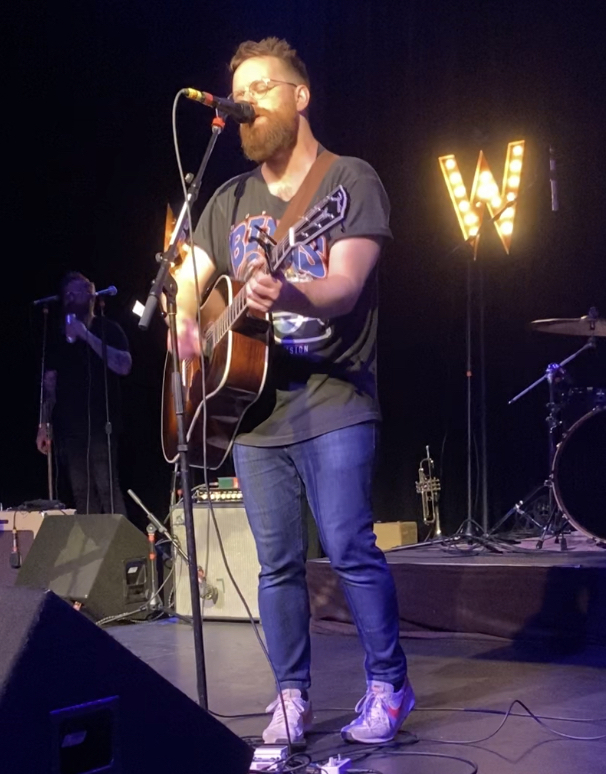
- West performing in 2022

Background information
- Also known as: Aaron West
- Origin: Philadelphia, Pennsylvania, Asbury Park, New Jersey Brooklyn, New York City (fictional biography)
- Genres: Folk rock, indie rock
- Years active: 2014–present
- Label: Hopeless Records
- Members: Dan "Soupy" Campbell
- Website: www.aaronwestandtheroaringtwenties.com

Aaron West and the Roaring Twenties is the solo project of The Wonder Years frontman Dan Campbell. According to the project's Facebook page, it is defined as "a character study conducted through music", with Campbell taking on the persona of Aaron West in each song's lyrics. The project's debut album, We Don't Have Each Other, was released in July 2014; a follow-up EP Bittersweet was released on May 20, 2016. Occasional singles were released by the group in-between albums. The project released its second album, entitled Routine Maintenance, on May 10, 2019. On January 10, 2024, a third album was announced named In Lieu of Flowers, released on April 12, 2024.

== History ==
=== We Don't Have Each Other (2014–15) ===
The Wonder Years frontman Dan Campbell began the project on May 22, 2014, via a video released by Hopeless Records titled "Aaron West and The Roaring Twenties - An Introduction To Aaron West". With this project, Campbell pushed himself "to make a piece of fiction feel just as raw and personal as songs about my life". Campbell released the projects debut song, "Divorce and the American South", via The A.V. Club. "You Ain't No Saint" was released as a single on May 27. "Divorce and the American South" was released as a single on June 10. The project's first album, We Don't Have Each Other, was released on July 8 through Hopeless. The album received primarily positive reviews, with Alternative Press giving it a rating of 4.5/5. On November 19, West released a music video for the song "Our Apartment" via Billboard. Campbell performed his project on five of the 2014 Vans Warped Tour dates. On March 4, 2015, it was announced that Campbell would be performing his project on all of the 2015 Warped Tour dates, on the acoustic basement stage.

The album is a concept record detailing the worst year of Aaron's life from start to finish. The album consists of 9 original songs and 1 cover song, "Going to Georgia" by The Mountain Goats. Campbell is said to have added the song to the album not because the song continued the story, but simply because he liked the song.

=== Bittersweet and Orchard Park (2016–18) ===
On March 25, 2016, it was announced that an EP, titled Bittersweet, would be released on May 20. The EP's cover art and track listing was revealed, and one song on the EP, "'67, Cherry Red", was made available for streaming. The release of the EP features vinyl pressings on three different colors, Green, Blue, and Red, attributing to the songs "Green Like the G Train, Green Like Sea Foam", "Goodbye, Carolina Blues", and "'67, Cherry Red" respectively.

"Orchard Park" was released on October 5, 2017 as a non-album single. The song visualizes Aaron driving with his mother to spread his father's ashes at Orchard Park.

=== Routine Maintenance and live album (2019–20) ===
The project's second LP, titled Routine Maintenance, was officially announced on March 18, 2019 and was given a projected release date of May 10.

In January 2020, Campbell announced a UK tour that was scheduled to begin in May of that year. Due to the COVID-19 pandemic, the tour was rescheduled for August 2021 but later cancelled and rebooked for May 2022. When the tour happened in 2022, Nick caught COVID-19 after 4 shows which resulted in the band except Dan to go home resulting in the remaining 3 shows to be solo shows.

On July 31, 2020, the project released Live From Asbury Park, created from recordings of two December 2019 live performances.

=== In Lieu of Flowers (2024–present) ===
The project's third LP, titled In Lieu of Flowers, was officially announced on the projects Facebook page on January 11, 2024 and given a projected release date of April 12. On January 24 the project announced a tour spanning the United States and the United Kingdom, with a record release show on April 11 in Asbury Park, NJ.

== Style and influences ==
Timothy Monger of AllMusic wrote that the project "blended the passion and aggression of pop punk with more of an Americana and roots aesthetic."

Campbell said in an interview with Rock Sound that he was inspired by The Mountain Goats' All Hail West Texas and The Weakerthans' Reunion Tour, and the artists' ability to create "such real, whole characters that I found myself invested in their lives and their stories."

== Discography ==
Studio albums

List of studio albums
| Title | Album details | Peak chart positions |
| Title | Album details | US |
|---|---|---|
| We Don't Have Each Other | Released: July 8, 2014; Label: Hopeless (HR800); Format: CD, DL, LP | 101 |
| Routine Maintenance | Released: May 10, 2019; Label: Hopeless; Format: CD, DL, LP | — |
| In Lieu of Flowers | Released: April 12, 2024; Label: Hopeless; Format: CD, DL, LP | TBA |

Extended plays

List of extended plays
| Title | Album details |
|---|---|
| Bittersweet | Released: May 20, 2016; Label: Hopeless; Format: DL, 7" vinyl |

Live albums

List of live albums
| Title | Album details |
|---|---|
| Live From Asbury Park | Released: July 31, 2020; Label: Hopeless; Format: DL, LP |

Singles

List of singles, showing year released and album name
| Title | Year | Album |
|---|---|---|
| "You Ain't No Saint" | 2014 | We Don't Have Each Other |
| "Divorce and the American South" | 2014 | We Don't Have Each Other |
| "'67, Cherry Red" | 2016 | Bittersweet |
| "Orchard Park" | 2017 | Non-album single |
| "Runnin' Toward the Light" | 2019 | Routine Maintenance |
| "Just Sign the Papers" | 2019 | Routine Maintenance |
| "Bury Me Anywhere Else" | 2019 | Routine Maintenance |
| "In Lieu of Flowers" | 2024 | In Lieu of Flowers |

Other Appearances

List of appearances on compilations
| Title | Year | Album |
|---|---|---|
| "Borrowed Chords" | 2011 | Love is Hopeless |
