= Sister Cities (album) =

Studio album by the Wonder Years
- Released: April 6, 2018
- Studio: Sunset Sound Studio 1
- Genre: Alternative rock; emo
- Length: 43:41
- Label: Hopeless
- Producer: Joe Chiccarelli

The Wonder Years chronology
No Closer to Heaven (2015)	Sister Cities (2018)	The Hum Goes on Forever (2022)

Singles from Sister Cities
- 1. "Sister Cities" Released: February 9, 2018; 2. "Pyramids of Salt" Released: March 9, 2018

Sister Cities is the sixth studio album by American rock band the Wonder Years.

== Background and concept ==
After the release of No Closer to Heaven in 2015, the Wonder Years spent two years on a massive world tour to support the album. Along the way, vocalist Dan Campbell kept a journal to document experiences and feelings, and the band took photographs of everything they saw. Following the tour, Campbell went through the collections and highlighted excerpts he felt were meaningful. Through this reflection, lyrics began to take shape, and the band worked to compose music that fit the mood of the lyrical content. According to Remfry Dedman of The Independent, Sister Cities came together from this process as "a record that seeks to create unity in a world that is becoming increasingly segregated".

Unity is a central theme on Sister Cities. As the band traveled the world, Campbell saw parallels between his own life and the lives of those perceived to be completely different. The title came about when The Wonder Years were waiting at a bus station in Santiago, Chile, after their scheduled tour stop in the city was cancelled. This bus station is near a monument that commemorated the city's international ties. While they were waiting, fans in Santiago asked them to play a different show. The band agreed, and fans picked them up from the station and took them to the venue, where they played for about 100 people. In an interview with Kerrang!, Campbell describes the experience fondly, stating that, "it got me thinking about how we were in a country with no particular reason for being there, and how immediately welcomed we felt when those kids helped us out and put us up for the night". This idea that individuals can find like-minded people thousands of miles from home stuck with Campbell, and the monuments near the Santiago bus station signified this connection, hence the name Sister Cities.

== Release ==
In late January 2018, The Wonder Years began to tease the album's release. They sent postcards to fans with a minimal version of the album's cover art on one side and a short excerpt from the title track, "Sister Cities", on the other. Other fans received unlabeled 7" vinyl records that held a spoken word poem and an early version of a new song. The band followed this with a worldwide scavenger hunt. They created a site on the domain withpinsandstrings.com and posted the geographic coordinates of posters they placed around the world, asking fans to work together online and find other fans near those locations to visit the coordinates and find the site's password. Once the password was deciphered and entered, the site revealed a teaser video for the album with clips from various songs and reflections from the band's members on the making of the Sister Cities.

On February 9, the first official single and title track "Sister Cities" was released, accompanied by a music video. The Wonder Years followed up a month later, on March 9, with the release of "Pyramids of Salt", the second and final single leading up to the release of the album. In the days before the album's release, the band held interactive pop-up shops in Chicago and Philadelphia to promote the new release. These shops featured exclusive merchandise, live acoustic performances by the band, and an on-site tattoo artist. On April 3, The Independent offered an exclusive stream of Sister Cities and an in-depth interview with vocalist Dan Campbell.

The album was officially released on April 6, 2018 on CD, vinyl, and all streaming platforms. The Wonder Years also released a limited edition vinyl version complete with a book of poems, journals, and photos from their world tour. The material in the book inspired the songs on Sister Cities, allowing fans to follow along with the writings and pictures as they are listening.

== Reception ==
Professional ratings
Aggregate scores
Source	Rating
AnyDecentMusic?	7.9/10
Metacritic	82/100
Review scores
Source	Rating
AllMusic	3.5/5 stars
DIY	4/5 stars
Exclaim!	9/10
GIGsoup	84%
The Line of Best Fit	8/10
Pitchfork	7.1/10
Punknews.org	4.5/5 stars
Sputnikmusic	4.5/5
Under the Radar	8.5/10 stars

Sister Cities was met with positive reviews from music critics. At Metacritic, which assigns a normalized rating out of 100 to reviews from mainstream critics, Sister Cities has an average score of 82 based on nine reviews, indicating "universal acclaim". The review aggregator AnyDecentMusic? gave the album 7.9 out of 10, based on their assessment of the critical consensus.

Many critics praised the maturation of the Wonder Years' sound and lyrics, with Sarah Jamieson of DIY calling the album "a renewed example of just how powerful and poignant The Wonder Years can be". Timothy Monger of AllMusic saw Sister Cities as a natural successor to No Closer to Heaven, making "a move away from the spry pop-punk of [the band's] early days to create something heavier and ultimately darker". Adam Feibel of Exclaim! praised the "deft manoeuvring and brute force" that the Wonder Years employed to enact a genre change, saying that Sister Cities "preserves the band's distinct stylistic markers and singer Dan Campbell's emotive power while applying it all with greater maturity and deliberation". Mischa Pearlman of Under the Radar similarly declared Sister Cities "a phenomenal album that not only transcends genres but which also only feels like the next phase of a career already 13 years short that has a long and exciting future ahead".

Sister Cities was seen by some as an altogether departure from pop punk, with Thomas Forrester of GIGsoup saying that the Wonder Years had "definitely climbed beyond the constraints of the genre". Renaldo Matadeen of Punknews.org said that Sister Cities was more alternative punk than pop-punk, "because to me this shows how unconventional and fluid the band can get". Luke O'Neil of Pitchfork went so far as to say that it "borders on critical malpractice to call the Wonder Years a pop-punk band at this point".

Opening track "Raining in Kyoto" was singled out for praise, with Channing Freeman of Sputnikmusic describing how the track "thrums like an elevated pulse before opening into a huge chorus". Dave Beech from The Line of Best Fit similarly declared the track "a takes-no-prisoners opener that rolls in a pounding drumbeat before exploding in to the sort of blistering catharsis of later Movielife material". Forrester said that "Raining in Kyoto" was "a solid track to kick off proceedings, and hints at the record's departure from the bands previous sound".

== Track listing ==
All tracks are written by The Wonder Years.

No.	Title	Length
1.	"Raining in Kyoto"	4:08
2.	"Pyramids of Salt"	4:42
3.	"It Must Get Lonely"	4:39
4.	"Sister Cities"	3:01
5.	"Flowers Where Your Face Should Be"	4:33
6.	"Heaven's Gate (Sad & Sober)"	3:24
7.	"We Look Like Lightning"	3:59
8.	"The Ghosts of Right Now"	3:09
9.	"When the Blue Finally Came"	2:11
10.	"The Orange Grove"	3:39
11.	"The Ocean Grew Hands to Hold Me"	6:16
Total length:		43:41

== Personnel ==
Personnel per booklet. All songs written by The Wonder Years. Lyrics and poetry written by Dan Campbell, edited by Hanif Willis-Abdurraqib.

The Wonder Years

- Matthew Brasch – rhythm guitar, vocals
- Daniel Campbell – lead vocals
- Casey Cavaliere – lead guitar, vocals
- Michael Kennedy – drums, percussion
- Joshua Martin – bass, vocals
- Nicholas Steinborn – guitar, keyboards

Additional Musicians

- Nate Sander, Kristine Kruta, and Gabe Valle - strings on "Flowers Where Your Face Should Be" and "The Ocean Grew Hands To Hold Me"
- Dave Mackinder - additional vocals on "It Must Get Lonely"

Production

- Joe Chiccarelli - producer
- Carlos de la Garza - mixing
- Emily Lazar - mastering
- Lars Fox and Nicholas Steinborn - additional engineering
- Arthur "Ace" Enders and Nik Bruzzese - strings engineering
- Michael Cortada - artwork and illustrations
- Mitch Wojcik, Jonathan Weiner, Kelly Mason, Dave Summers, Megan Thompson, and Dan Campbell - photography
- Werewolf Girlfriend - layout

== Charts ==
Chart performance for Sister Cities
Chart (2018)	Peak position
Scottish Albums (OCC)	41
UK Albums (OCC)	70
UK Album Downloads (OCC)	61
UK Independent Albums (OCC)	12
UK Rock & Metal Albums (OCC)	3
US Billboard 200	18
US Independent Albums (Billboard)	1
US Top Album Sales (Billboard)	5
US Top Alternative Albums (Billboard)	3
US Top Rock Albums (Billboard)	5
US Indie Store Album Sales (Billboard)	3
US Vinyl Albums (Billboard)	1
