= The Greatest Generation (album) =

Studio album by the Wonder Years
- Released: May 14, 2013
- Recorded: January–February 2013
- Genre: Pop punk; emo; melodic hardcore
- Length: 48:51
- Label: Hopeless
- Producer: Steve Evetts

The Wonder Years chronology
Sleeping on Trash: A Collection of Songs Recorded 2005–2010 (2013)	The Greatest Generation (2013)	No Closer to Heaven (2015)

Singles from The Greatest Generation
- 1. "Passing Through a Screen Door" Released: March 27, 2013; 2. "Dismantling Summer" Released: April 16, 2013

The Greatest Generation is the fourth studio album by American rock band the Wonder Years. The album was produced by Steve Evetts, who also produced their previous album, Suburbia I've Given You All and Now I'm Nothing.

The album's lyrical themes include adolescence, aging, choices, self-reflection and failure.

== Background ==
On January 13, 2013, Campbell posted that the group had finished pre-production. On February 12, the band announced they had finished recording.

In the teaser video the band talked about the recording and writing process of the album. They wrote the album in a small apartment above an abandoned sandwich shop. In the teaser, "Soupy" Campbell called it a third piece in a trilogy about growing up. He also stated the album was about the end of the war he had within himself fighting depression and anxiety. The title is taken from the term coined by Tom Brokaw about how the generation that fought in World War II was 'the greatest generation'.

The Greatest Generation was a part of a trilogy (along with The Upsides [2010] and Suburbia I've Given You All and Now I'm Nothing) that dealt with vocalist Dan Campbell's struggles of being scared, loneliness and feeling lost. Grantland writer Steven Hyden compared albums by Japandroids, Fucked Up, and Cloud Nothings to The Greatest Generation due to them "shar[ing musical] DNA with Generation." "Dismantling Summer" was written after Campbell's grandfather had a heart attack.

== Release ==
On March 6, 2013 The Greatest Generation was announced for release in May, revealing its track listing and artwork. The band then embarked on headlining US tour with support from Fireworks, Hostage Calm and Misser. On March 19, the group released a video trailer for the album. On March 25, "Passing Through a Screen Door" was made available for streaming via AbsolutePunk. Over the next two days, a lyric video was released, and the song was released as a single. On April 15, "Dismantling Summer" was made available for streaming via Alternative Press. The following day, a lyric video was post online, and the track was released as a single. On May 2, a lyric video was released for "The Bastards, the Vultures, the Wolves". On May 8, The Greatest Generation was made available for streaming.

The band played four record release shows in 24 hours in support of the album: Philadelphia at 6pm on May 10 with Modern Baseball; New York City at 12am on May 11 with A Loss for Words; Chicago at 10am on May 11 with Mixtapes; and Anaheim at 6pm on May 11 with Versus the World and the Sheds. Due to travel complications the Anaheim show did not begin until 8 pm. The Greatest Generation was released on May 14 through Hopeless Records. In June, the group supported Silverstein on their tour of Canada. In August, the band performed in Japan. In September and October, the band supported A Day to Remember on the House Party tour in the US. In between dates on the tour, the band supported All Time Low for a few headlining shows. On November 13, a music video was released for "There, There".

In November the group went on a headful of UK shows, included UK Warped Tour, with support from Real Friends. Proceeding this, the group played a handful of shows in Europe. In December, the band went on a short acoustic holiday tour with Vinnie Caruana and Young Statues. On March 24, 2014, a music video was released for "Dismantling Summer". In March and April 2014 the group embarked on a North American headlining tour with support from Citizen, Real Friends and Modern Baseball. They group offered VIP bundles which included pre-show acoustic sets and Q&As, along with memorabilia. Defeater was originally scheduled to support, however, due to their vocalist becoming ill, they were replaced by Fireworks. In May, the group went on a headlining European and UK tour with support from State Champs and A Loss for Words. In August, the group appeared at the Reading and Leeds Festivals in the UK. In September, the group was due to perform in Australia, but was unable to due to "circumstances beyond our control". In October, the group went on a headlining US tour with support from The Story So Far, Modern Baseball, Gnarwolves.

== Reception ==
Professional ratings
Aggregate scores
Source	Rating
Metacritic	97/100
Review scores
Source	Rating
Absolutepunk	5/5 stars
Allmusic	4/5 stars
Big Cheese	5/5
Kerrang!	5/5 stars
Punknews.org	4/5 stars
Sputnikmusic	5/5 stars

The Greatest Generation has received critical acclaim upon its release. At Metacritic, which assigns a normalized rating out of 100 to reviews from mainstream critics the album holds an overall rating of 97, which indicates "universal acclaim", based on 5 reviews. Scott Heisel of Alternative Press gave the album 4.5 out 5 stars saying, "It's fast, it's honest, and it'll probably make you tear up more than once." Thomas Nassif of Absolute Punk did not even give the album a standard rating from 10 to 10, stating "It is my firm belief that The Greatest Generation has no real precedent in this community. It's my belief that there isn't another band in pop-punk right now that can write a record this good." David Allen of TheCelebrityCafe.com, gave the album a 5/5, stating, "This album, more than ever, speaks to the fast, the angry, and the unforgiving part of the human subconscious...It feels as if this album, by itself, has been able to repossess every inch of teenage angst over the past 60 years and throw it back up into arrangements, lining it up half-hazardly [sic], and yet purposefully, to hear.".

Commercially it was also successful. It was their first to crack the top 20 at Billboard 200, moving 19,673 copies on its first week and reaching the number 20 spot. The album has sold 50,000 copies in the United States as of August 2015.

== Legacy ==
In retrospect Rock Sound included The Greatest Generation on their best albums of 2013 list, calling it "the defining album of what may well have been the genre's best year for a decade." Kerrang! said the album "ripped up the pop-punk blueprint" pushing the genre to "new peaks of invention, both lyrically and musically".

Rolling Stone listed the album at No. 41 on their feature "The 50 Greatest Pop Punk Albums".

== Track listing ==
All tracks are written by The Wonder Years.

No.	Title	Length
1.	"There, There"	2:26
2.	"Passing Through a Screen Door"	3:35
3.	"We Could Die Like This"	3:38
4.	"Dismantling Summer"	3:46
5.	"The Bastards, the Vultures, the Wolves"	3:55
6.	"The Devil in My Bloodstream"	4:05
7.	"Teenage Parents"	3:38
8.	"Chaser"	3:54
9.	"An American Religion (FSF)"	2:16
10.	"A Raindance in Traffic"	3:39
11.	"Madelyn"	2:47
12.	"Cul-de-Sac"	3:38
13.	"I Just Want to Sell Out My Funeral"	7:34
Total length:		48:51

== Personnel ==
Personnel per digital booklet.

The Wonder Years

- Matthew Brasch – rhythm guitar, vocals
- Dan "Soupy" Campbell – lead vocals, acoustic guitar on "Madelyn"
- Casey Cavaliere – lead guitar, vocals
- Mike Kennedy – drums, percussion
- Josh Martin – bass, vocals
- Nick Steinborn – guitar, keyboards, vocals

Additional musician

- Laura Stevenson – additional vocals on "The Devil in My Bloodstream"

Production

- Steve Evetts – producer, engineer
- Mark Trombino – mixing
- Alan Douches – mastering
- Nick Steinborn, Allan Hessler, Peter Naddeo – additional engineering
- James Heimer – illustration, layout, design
- Mitchell Wojcik – photo of the Wonder Years
- Monica Leonhardt – copy editing

== Chart performance ==
Chart (2013)	Peak position
U.S. Billboard 200	20
U.S. Billboard Alternative Albums	4
U.S. Billboard Independent Albums	3
U.S. Billboard Tastemaker Albums	2
U.S. Billboard Top Album Sales	20
U.S. Billboard Top Rock Albums	4
U.S. Billboard Vinyl Albums	2
