= Suburbia I've Given You All and Now I'm Nothing =

Studio album by the Wonder Years
- Released: June 14, 2011
- Recorded: January–February 2011 at The Omen Room Studios, Garden Grove, California
- Genres: Emo; pop-punk; melodic hardcore; post-hardcore
- Length: 40:07
- Label: Hopeless
- Producer: Steve Evetts

The Wonder Years chronology
The Upsides (2010)	Suburbia I've Given You All and Now I'm Nothing (2011)	Sleeping on Trash: A Collection of Songs Recorded 2005–2010 (2013)

Singles from Suburbia I've Given You All and Now I'm Nothing
- 1. "Local Man Ruins Everything" Released: April 12, 2011; 2. "Don't Let Me Cave In" Released: May 3, 2011

Suburbia I've Given You All and Now I'm Nothing is the third studio album by American rock band the Wonder Years released on June 14, 2011, the group's first release on Hopeless Records.

== Music and lyrics ==
Suburbia I've Given You All and Now I'm Nothing is a part of a trilogy (along with The Upsides [2010] and The Greatest Generation [2013]) that deal with vocalist Dan Campbell's struggles of fear, loneliness and feeling lost.

The title of the album, five of the song titles, and some lyrical contents reference the Allen Ginsberg poem "America" which according to the album's liner notes served as the primary inspiration for the record. "Came Out Swinging" begins with a sample of Ginsberg reading the poem.

The album's lyrical topics include insurance fraud, homelessness and living spaces.

== Recording ==
The album was produced by Steve Evetts. Evetts would push the band to get the perfect take to the point where they felt sick, such as Dan Campbell throwing up twice while recording vocals. Dan O'Connor and Alan Day, both from Four Year Strong, recorded their guest vocals for "Summers in PA" while on The Wonder Years' tour bus during the 2011 edition of the Kerrang! Tour.

== Release ==
The group performed on the Kerrang! Tour in the UK in February 2011. Following this, they played a one-off headlining show in the UK. In March, the band went on tour with Man Overboard and Handguns. In April and May, the group embarked on a headlining US tour, dubbed The Man Scout Jamboree tour. They were supported by Fireworks, Such Gold, Make Do and Mend and Living with Lions. On April 11, Suburbia I've Given You All and Now I'm Nothing was announced for release in June. In addition, its track listing and artwork were revealed. The following day, "Local Man Ruins Everything" was made available for streaming and released as a single. On May 3, a music video was released for "Don't Let Me Cave In". The track was also released as a single. In May, the group supported Parkway Drive on their headlining tour of Australia, dubbed The Mix N Mash Tour. On June 1, "Coffee Eyes" was made available for streaming on the Alternative Press website.

Suburbia I've Given You All and Now I'm Nothing was made available for streaming on June 10, before being released on June 14 through Hopeless Records. To celebrate its release, the group performed a record release show in Philadelphia, Pennsylvania. The artwork features the band's mascot, Hank the Pigeon. Later in the month, an acoustic version of "Woke Up Older" was included on an Hopeless Records various artists compilation, Another Hopeless Summer. Throughout the summer, the group performed on Warped Tour. On August 11, a music video was premiered for "Local Man Ruins Everything" via Alternative Press. In September, the group embarked on a headlining UK tour, dubbed A Whole Year in Airports, with support from Valencia and Such Gold. In October and November, the band supported New Found Glory on their Pop Punk's Not Dead tour in the US. On November 22, a music video was released for "Came Out Swinging".

In March and April 2012, the band headlined the Glamour Kills Spring 2012 tour in the US. They were supported by Polar Bear Club, Transit, The Story So Far, A Loss for Words and Into It. Over It. To promote the tour, a compilation album was released that featured the bands covering one of the other bands' songs. The Wonder Years' contribution was a cover of the Into It. Over It. track "Anchor". At three of the shows on the tour, the band performed the album in its entirety. In May and June, the band went on tour with The Early November. The group performed two shows in June as part of the Zumiez Couch Tour. On November 6, a deluxe edition of the album was released. It featured outtakes and demos recordings. In November and December, the band supported Yellowcard on their headlining tour of the US. Also in December, the group headlining the Glamour Kills holiday festival and supported The Starting Line.

== Reception ==
Professional ratings
Review scores
Source	Rating
AbsolutePunk.net	5/5 stars
AllMusic	3.5/5 stars
Alternative Press	4.5/5 stars
BLARE Magazine	4.5/5 stars
Kerrang!	5/5 stars
Punknews.org	4/5 stars

The album debuted at number 73 on the Billboard 200, selling about 8,100 copies in its first week of release.

The album was included at number 5 on Rock Sound's "The 51 Most Essential Pop Punk Albums of All Time" list. BuzzFeed included the album at number 32 on their "36 Pop Punk Albums You Need To Hear Before You F——ing Die" list. Cleveland.com ranked "Came Out Swinging" at number 54 on their list of the top 100 pop-punk songs.

== Track listing ==
=== Original release ===
All tracks are written by The Wonder Years.

No.	Title	Length
1.	"Came Out Swinging"	4:04
2.	"Woke Up Older"	3:33
3.	"Local Man Ruins Everything"	2:49
4.	"Suburbia"	0:51
5.	"My Life as a Pigeon"	3:06
6.	"Summers in PA"	3:17
7.	"I Won't Say the Lord's Prayer"	3:06
8.	"Coffee Eyes"	3:39
9.	"I've Given You All"	1:40
10.	"Don't Let Me Cave In"	3:23
11.	"You Made Me Want to Be a Saint"	1:31
12.	"Hoodie Weather"	4:01
13.	"And Now I'm Nothing"	5:00

=== Digital deluxe edition bonus tracks ===
No.	Title	Length
14.	"My Life as Rob Gordon"	3:58
15.	"Me vs. the Highway"	3:41
16.	"Living Room Song"	2:49
17.	"Don't Let Me Cave In (Nervous Energies)"	3:44
18.	"Woke Up Older" (Acoustic)	3:38
19.	"Local Man Ruins Everything" (Acoustic)	3:00
20.	"Came Out Swinging" (Demo)	3:44
21.	"Don't Let Me Cave In" (Demo)	3:25
22.	"Coffee Eyes" (Live demo)	3:34
23.	"Woke Up Older" (Live demo)	3:37
24.	"It's Murder-Suicide" (Nu metal jam)	2:49

== Personnel ==
- Dan "Soupy" Campbell - lead vocals
- Matthew Brasch - rhythm guitar, vocals
- Josh Martin - bass, vocals
- Casey Cavaliere - lead guitar, vocals
- Nick Steinborn - keyboards, guitar, vocals
- Mike Kennedy - drums, percussion

Additional personnel

- Alan Day (of Four Year Strong) - vocals on "Summers in PA"
- Dan O'Connor (of Four Year Strong)- vocals on "Summers in PA”

== Chart performance ==
Chart (2011)	Peak position
U.S. Billboard 200	73
U.S. Billboard Alternative Albums	12
U.S. Billboard Independent Albums	11
U.S. Billboard Tastemaker Albums	3
U.S. Billboard Top Album Sales	73
U.S. Billboard Top Rock Albums	20
