= Zolof the Rock & Roll Destroyer =

American band

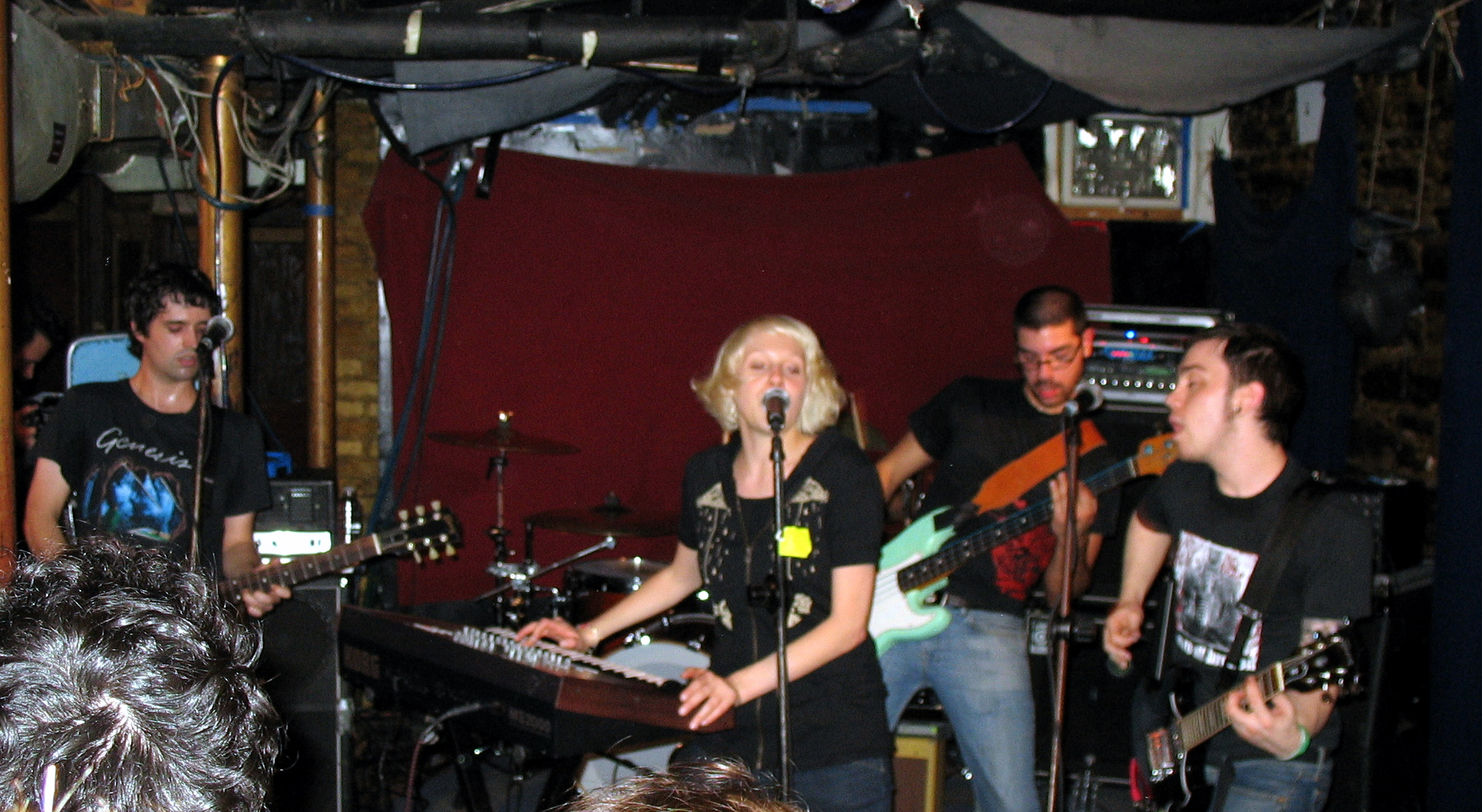
- Zolof playing for MTV2's Dew Circuit Breakout

Background information
- Origin: Philadelphia, Pennsylvania, United States
- Genres: Synthrock, indie rock, power pop, pop punk
- Years active: 2000-2010
- Label: Eyeball Records
- Past members: Rachel Minton; Vince Ratti; Jon Lyons; Matt Bergman; Matt Celeste; T.J. De Blois; Peter Helmis; Greg Kerr; Anthony Green
- Website: zoloftherockandrolldestroyer.com

Zolof the Rock & Roll Destroyer (often referred to as simply Zolof) were an American pop rock band that originated in Philadelphia, Pennsylvania through core members Vince Ratti and Rachel Minton alongside Anthony Green. Their music, defined by the band members as "spunk rock", is heavily structured and influenced by pop music by way of catchy rhythms and bright lyrics.

The band competed in 2006's Mountain Dew Circuit Breakout challenge on MTV2, but was beaten by California band Halifax.

The band played its most recent concert in 2009 and has presumably since broken up as the members have moved on to other projects.

== Discography ==
- Zolof the Rock and Roll Destroyer (LP) (2002)
- Jalopy Go Far (LP) (2003)
- The Popsicle EP (EP) (2004)
- Unicorns, Demos, B-Sides, And Rainbows (Self Released) (2005)
- "Set the Ray to Jerry"
  - Set the Ray to Jerry - Single (2005) iTunes Music Store exclusive
  - The Killer in You (2006) The Smashing Pumpkins tribute compilation
- Duet All Night Long (Split with Reel Big Fish) (2007)
- Schematics (2007)
- Up End Atom A tribute compilation to Atom & His Package (2009)
