= We Don't Have Each Other =

Studio album by Aaron West and the Roaring Twenties
- Released: July 8, 2014
- Recorded: 2013–2014
- Genre: Folk rock, indie rock, emo
- Length: 37:43
- Label: Hopeless Records

Aaron West and the Roaring Twenties chronology
We Don't Have Each Other (2014)	Bittersweet (2016)

Singles from We Don't Have Each Other
- 1. "You Ain't No Saint" Released: May 27, 2014; 2. "Divorce and the American South" Released: June 10, 2014

We Don't Have Each Other is the debut studio album from American folk rock project Aaron West and the Roaring Twenties, released on July 8, 2014, through Hopeless Records.

== Background ==
Dan Campbell announced the Aaron West side project on May 22, 2014, releasing "You Ain't No Saint" as the first single on May 27, 2014. The album's second single, "Divorce and the American South," was released on June 10, 2014, followed by the album on July 8, 2014.

Professional ratings
Aggregate scores
Source	Rating
Metacritic	71/100
Review scores
Source	Rating
AllMusic	3/5 stars
Alternative Press	4.5/5 stars
Kerrang!	3/5 stars
Sputnik Music	4.5/5 stars
Rock Sound	6/10
Punknews.org	4/5 stars
Already Heard	5/5 stars
DEAD PRESS!	10/10 stars

== Track listing ==
No.	Title	Length
1.	"Our Apartment"	3:34
2.	"Grapefruit"	4:13
3.	"St. Joe Keeps Us Safe"	3:31
4.	"Runnin' Scared"	3:14
5.	"Divorce and the American South"	4:20
6.	"The Thunderbird Inn"	3:19
7.	"Get Me Out Of Here Alive"	3:32
8.	"You Ain't No Saint"	4:26
9.	"Carolina Coast"	5:02
10.	"Going to Georgia" (The Mountain Goats cover)	2:32
Total length:		37:43

== Personnel ==
Credits from Discogs.

Aaron West and the Roaring Twenties

- Dan "Soupy" Campbell – Vocals, Guitar, Harmonica, Photography (Additional)

Additional musicians

- Arthur "Ace" Enders – Guitar, bass, lap steel guitar, banjo, keyboards, vocals
- Dave Heck – Trombone
- Mikey Kelley – Trumpet
- Mike Kennedy – Drums
- John Ryan – Saxophone

Artwork

- Allison Weiss – Layout
- Mitchell Wojcik – Photography

Production

- Arthur "Ace" Enders – Producer, engineer, mixing
- Bill Henderson – Mastering
