= The Upsides =

Studio album by the Wonder Years
- Released: January 26, 2010
- Recorded: August 2009
- Studios: Skylight, Fairless Hills, Pennsylvania
- Genre: Pop punk
- Length: 39:47
- Labels: No Sleep, Hopeless Records, Run For Cover Records
- Producer: Vince Ratti

The Wonder Years chronology
| Get Stoked on It! (2007) | The Upsides (2010) | Suburbia I've Given You All and Now I'm Nothing (2011) |

Alternative cover

The Upsides is the second studio album by American rock band the Wonder Years, released through No Sleep Records and Run For Cover Records on January 26, 2010. The album was recorded with producer Vince Ratti at Skylight Studios in Fairless Hills, Pennsylvania. After being signed by Hopeless Records, The Upsides was later reissued in a deluxe edition featuring four new songs.

== Concept and themes ==
The Upsides is a part of a trilogy (along with Suburbia I've Given You All and Now I'm Nothing [2011] and The Greatest Generation [2013]) that dealt with vocalist Dan Campbell's struggles of being scared, loneliness and feeling lost. The album explores real life topics such as college, heartbreak, hope, angst and anger.

As vocalist and lyricist Dan "Soupy" Campbell explained on the album's vinyl release, The Upsides is about fighting back. He began writing the album on early morning bike rides, compiling lines in a notebook for an album that was intended to be about how he had given up. Although it seemed the members of the band had been beaten into misery in their early 20s, Campbell, after riding past a fountain at "Logan Circle" and seeing it had been switched on, realized it wasn't right for him to feel defeated at 23. After a month of writing with the band living in his home, they emerged with a newly adopted "we're not sad anymore" philosophy.

"The whole world wants you to be miserable. It wants you to put your head down, sigh to yourself and give up on being happy, and I know just as well as anyone that sometimes, giving up seems like the only option, but if you take one thing from this record I hope it's this. Don't give those mother-fuckers an inch. Stand your ground every chance you get because everybody deserves a chance to be happy."

— Dan "Soupy" Campbell, The Wonder Years lyricist and vocalist, on the message conveyed by The Upsides.

Whilst the lyrics have been referred to as "more personal than ever," the band didn't shy away from the humor on their previous releases, with topics about sexting (referring to a member of I Call Fives), cock-blocking, and fist pumping. The lyrics also venture into different themes in each song, from the loneliness of tour life ("Everything I Own Fits in this Backpack"), to social awkwardness ("This Party Sucks") and persevering through bad times ("Washington Square Park"). Allmusic's review said The Upsides has a concept album-like feel and is filled with "post-college angst, busted hearts, big questions, hope, anger, humor, and life", adding that the songs fit together like an intricate puzzle, flowing like it was an entire diary's worth of observations, feelings and events.

Campbell said "when the record came out, I was not in the best spot." He had broken up with his girlfriend of two years but still felt "the prevailing theme kind of worked because while I was kind of down at the moment; it was a different down than I had been before. Like in the past, I’ve been depressed, and just kind of been complacent, and okay with it, but this was a different sad. This was a sad where I was mourning what I didn’t have anymore, with the girl I was dating and a couple [of] other things, but it wasn’t hopeless. I knew things were going to get better, and it was just a matter of waiting it out." They later recorded bonus tracks for The Upsides, and one of the songs was about the situation he found himself in upon the album's release.

== Release and promotion ==
On November 11, 2009, The Upsides was announced for release in two months' time; alongside this, the track listing was posted online. To close out the year, the band played three Northeast holiday shows. On December 17, 2009, "Melrose Diner" was posted on the band's Myspace profile. The Upsides was released on January 26, 2010; to promote it, the band played a handful of release shows across the country. The Upsides sold 1,845 units in its first week, charting at number nine on the Billboard Top Heatseekers and 42 on the Top Independent Albums charts.

After a US tour with Therefore I Am and Man Overboard, the Wonder Years went on an East Coast US tour with Crime in Stereo. Following a short tour with Such Gold and We Are the Union, the band supported Set Your Goals on their cross-country US tour through to May 2010. Following the success of the album's release, The Wonder Years announced in May 2010 they signed with Hopeless Records. Between June and August 2010, the band went on a US tour supporting Streetlight Manifesto. Following this, the band supported New Found Glory on their US tour, prior to an Australian tour in September 2010 with Tonight Alive.

A deluxe edition of The Upsides was released through Hopeless Records. It included four extra tracks, two of which had not been heard before. "I Was Scared and I'm Sorry" was written about a break-up and everything changing in Campbell's life. "We Won't Bury You" was written for a friend of the band who was in rehab and later died of an overdose before hearing the song. The first of the reworked songs was a take on "Dynamite Shovel"; "Recorded live in one room with a bunch of mics everywhere, this finds us stomping and clapping and yelling and laughing". The final track is a completely reworked "slowed down, piano-based version" of the song "Logan Circle," said to be "completely reminiscent of the song it actually is, but it's different lyrics (and a) different structure".

In October 2015, the band announced another reissue of the album, due for release on December 18. This time it features new artwork and all the bonus tracks made available with the previous deluxe edition of the album, in addition to "Leavenhouse. 11:30."

== Reception ==
Professional ratings
Review scores
| Source | Rating |
|---|---|
| AbsolutePunk | (86%) |
| Allmusic | 3.5/5 stars |
| Punknews.org | 4/5 stars |
| Alternative Press | 4/5 stars |

Allmusic said the "bleeding humanity" of the band and how Campbell "sounds like a regular guy, not a rock & roll frontman" help The Upsides bring "a time-honored sound" and "make it sound fresh and exciting by doing it seriously right". Reviewer Tim Sendra complimented the dueling riffs of guitarists Matt Brasch and Casey Cavaliere, Mike Kennedy's drum work and how Nick Steinborn adds the occasional unobtrusive keyboard part: "They simply take the best of each element of their conglomerated sound (the hookiness of pop, the heart-spilling fever of emo, the rambling energy of punk) and let it rip." The album was included at number 24 on Rock Sound's "The 51 Most Essential Pop Punk Albums of All Time" list in 2014. In April 2019, the same magazine ranked the album at number 133 on its list of the "250 Greatest Albums of Our Lifetime". Tobi Duncan of Trash Boat has expressed admiration for the album.

== Track listing ==
=== Original release ===
All tracks are written by The Wonder Years.

| No. | Title | Length |
|---|---|---|
| 1. | "My Last Semester" | 3:51 |
| 2. | "Logan Circle" | 2:56 |
| 3. | "Everything I Own Fits in This Backpack" | 4:18 |
| 4. | "Dynamite Shovel" | 1:05 |
| 5. | "New Years with Carl Weathers" | 3:11 |
| 6. | "It's Never Sunny in South Philadelphia" | 4:05 |
| 7. | "Hostels & Brothels" | 3:45 |
| 8. | "Melrose Diner" | 3:21 |
| 9. | "This Party Sucks" | 3:30 |
| 10. | "Hey Thanks" | 2:32 |
| 11. | "Washington Square Park" | 3:30 |
| 12. | "All My Friends Are in Bar Bands" | 3:52 |
| Total length: | | 39:47 |

=== Re-issue bonus tracks ===
| No. | Title | Length |
|---|---|---|
| 13. | "I Was Scared & I'm Sorry" | 4:05 |
| 14. | "Dynamite Shovel" (campfire version) | 1:12 |
| 15. | "Logan Circle: A New Hope" | 4:33 |
| 16. | "We Won't Bury You" | 1:51 |
| Total length: | | 51:26 |

== Personnel ==
The Wonder Years

- Dan "Soupy" Campbell — vocals, ukulele
- Matt Brasch — rhythm guitar, vocals
- Josh Martin — bass, vocals
- Casey Cavaliere — lead guitar, vocals
- Michael Kennedy — drums
- Nick Steinborn — keys, guitar, vocals
- Bill Henderson — mastering
- Jake Sulzer — mastering (acoustic tracks)
- Mitchell Wojcik — photography
- Guest vocals on "Hey Thanks" — Rachel Minton (Zolof The Rock & Roll Destroyer)
- Guest trombone on "Hey Thanks" — Matt Belanger (We Are The Union)
- Guest vocals on "All My Friends Are in Bar Bands" — Shane Henderson (Valencia), Dave Mackinder (Fireworks), Matty Arsenault (A Loss For Words), Jamie Rhoden (Title Fight), Nik Bruzzese (Man Overboard), Charlie Saxton and Nick O'Neill (Sink Or Swim)

== Chart performance ==
| Chart (2010) | Peak position |
|---|---|
| U.S. Billboard Heatseekers Albums | 9 |
| U.S. Billboard Independent Albums | 42 |
