= The Wonder Years (band) =

American rock band

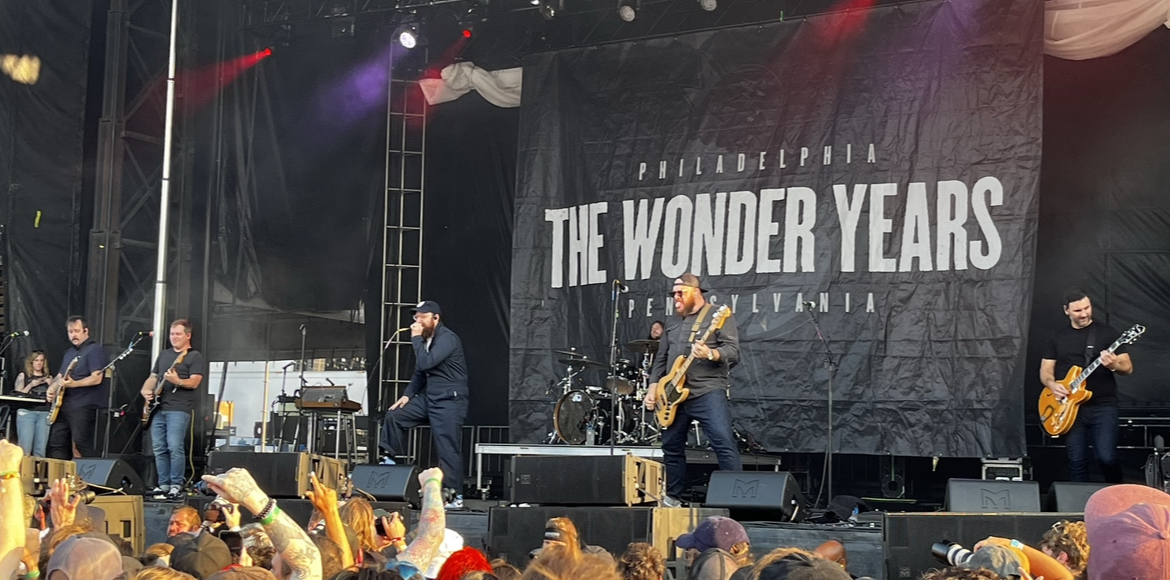
- The Wonder Years performing at Riot Fest 2022 in Chicago

Background information
- Origin: Lansdale, Pennsylvania, U.S.
- Genres: Pop-punk; emo; alternative rock; easycore (early)
- Years active: 2005–present
- Labels: No Sleep; Hopeless; Loneliest Place on Earth
- Spinoff of: The Premier
- Members: Dan "Soupy" Campbell; Casey Cavaliere; Matt Brasch; Josh Martin; Nick Steinborn; Mike Kennedy
- Past members: Mikey Kelly
- Website: thewonderyearsband.com

The Wonder Years is an American rock band from Lansdale, Pennsylvania, formed in July 2005. The band currently consists of Dan "Soupy" Campbell (lead vocals), Casey Cavaliere (lead guitar, backing vocals), Matt Brasch (guitar, vocals), Josh Martin (bass, vocals), Nick Steinborn (keyboards, guitar, backing vocals) and Mike Kennedy (drums, percussion). They have released seven full-length albums, two EPs, and several splits/compilations. The group is currently signed to Hopeless Records.

== History ==
=== Formation, the early years (2005–2006) ===
The Wonder Years were formed in 2005 out of the remnants of an old Lansdale, Pennsylvania, band called The Premier. The Premier consisted of future Wonder Years members Dan "Soupy" Campbell, Matt Brasch and Nick Steinborn, Matt Wells, Dave Hughes and CJ Morgan. The first Wonder Years practice was in Mike Kennedy's basement on July 5, 2005. On that day they wrote their first song, "Buzz Aldrin: The Poster Boy for Second Place".

In their first two years, two split EPs with other local bands were released. Their first, with Emergency and I, was released in 2005, featuring two songs later re-recorded on their first full-length album Get Stoked on It! -- "I Fell in Love with a Ninja Master" and "Buzz Aldrin: The Poster Boy for Second Place"—plus "Cowboy Killers". The second was split with band Bangarang! and also featured two songs that would be re-recorded for Get Stoked on It! -- "My Geraldine Lies Over the Delaware" and "Let's Moshercise!". The other two songs on the EP were "I Ain't Sayin' He a Gold Digga (Sike!)" and "Through Two Hearts".

=== Get Stoked on It! and Won't Be Pathetic Forever EP (2007–2009) ===
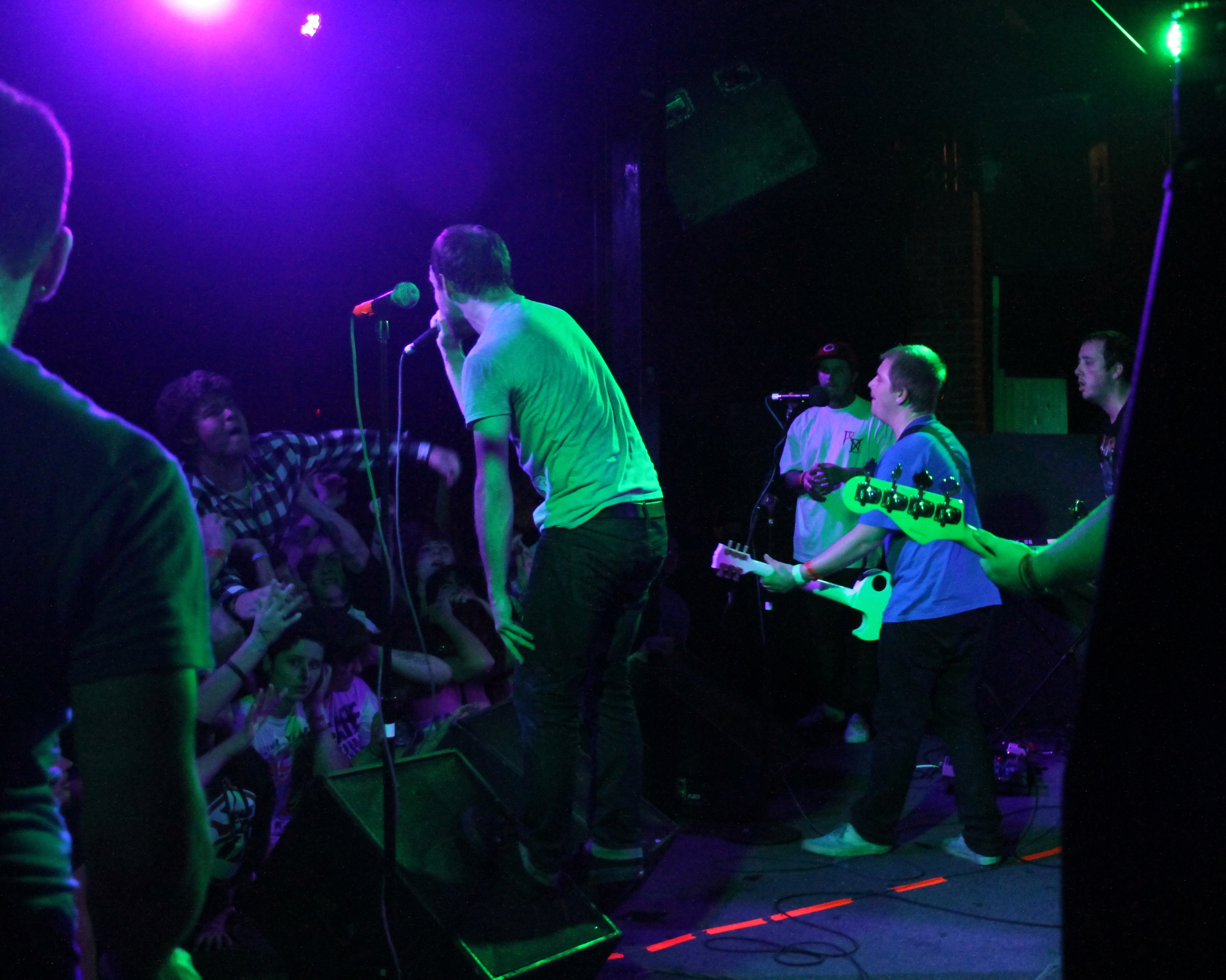
The Wonder Years performing in 2009

The Wonder Years signed to No Sleep Records in 2007. After completing their first tour of the United Kingdom with Never So True, The Wonder Years recorded their first full-length studio album, Get Stoked on It!. Get Stoked on It! was released on October 30, 2007, and caused the band's then-small fan base to grow significantly. In the spring of 2008, The Wonder Years released an EP titled Won't Be Pathetic Forever. In March 2009, The Wonder Years' released a split EP titled Distances with UK pop punk band All or Nothing. The split consisted of two new songs by The Wonder Years, "An Elegy For Baby Blue" and "Don't Shut The Fridge!" It was after this release that keyboardist/backing vocalist Mikey Kelly left the band to pursue other goals. Drummer Mike Kennedy left shortly thereafter, and was replaced by new drummer Nick Steinborn. This iteration of the band only lasted a matter of months, however, as Kennedy ultimately returned to the fold shortly after his departure – moving Steinborn to Kelly's previous role of keyboardist, as well as expanding the band to three guitarists.

=== The Upsides (2010–2011) ===
The Wonder Years' second full-length album, The Upsides, was released on January 26, 2010. The Upsides sold 1852 units in its first week, landing it on multiple Billboard charts: No. 5 on Alternative Artist, No. 9 on Top New Artist, No. 26 on Top Internet Album, and No. 43 on Indie Label Album.

Also with the release of The Upsides was a 7-inch limited to only 500 copies and available with pre-order of The Upsides CD. This vinyl features a non-album song entitled "Leavenhouse. 11:30.", which is about the early years of music for The Wonder Years and their local scene in Lansdale, PA. The title "Leavenhouse" refers to a house in which members of the Lansdale band Leavenworth lived and hung out at day or night.

A few months after the release of The Upsides, on May 27, The Wonder Years announced that they had signed to Hopeless Records. Their first release after their signing was a split 7-inch with Fallen from the Sky, on which they covered "Zip Lock" by Lit.

The Wonder Years released a deluxe edition of The Upsides on September 21, 2010. It included 4 new songs titled, "I Was Scared & I'm Sorry", "We Won't Bury You", "Dynamite Shovel (campfire version)", and "Logan Circle: A New Hope". "We Won't Bury You" was written about best friend Mike Pelone who was also in the band Emergency and I. Mike Pelone died in August 2010.

In October 2010, The Wonder Years released a music video for the song "Melrose Diner" set to the theme of BAW Wrestling and starring actor Charlie Saxton as the wrestler "Lone Wolf".

=== Suburbia I've Given You All and Now I'm Nothing (2011–2013) ===
In the fall of 2010, The Wonder Years confirmed that they were writing the follow-up to The Upsides. On June 14, 2011, The Wonder Years released Suburbia I've Given You All and Now I'm Nothing on Hopeless Records. "Suburbia" is inspired by the poem America by Allen Ginsberg as well as the band's life following the release of The Upsides. The first single off the album titled "Local Man Ruins Everything" was released on April 12, 2011, on iTunes. The second single, "Don't Let Me Cave In", was released on iTunes and Amazon on May 3, 2011, along with a music video. The third single, "Coffee Eyes" was made available for streaming on the Alternative Press website on June 1, 2011. The record charted at number 73 on the Billboard Top 200 the week of its release, selling 8,100 copies. On August 11, 2011, they released a music video for "Local Man Ruins Everything". The video consists of Hank the Pigeon "adventuring on his own" around Lansdale and Philadelphia.

The band released a split 6-inch with Stay Ahead of the Weather entitled Punk Is Dead. Get a Job. on April 17, 2012, and re-released their debut full-length, Get Stoked on It!, on May 15, 2012. The album will only be available digitally through the record label's website. Campbell, who has been outspoken about his disappointment in the band's first album, said, "In our opinion, this record is a trainwreck. Chris paid to get it remastered forever ago and we kept trying to put off its inevitable re-release. He and I agreed that since it's already available digitally, that no real harm can come of swapping out the old mixes with the better sounding ones as long as it never gets pressed in a physical form again. That's the long and short of it. If you like the record, enjoy the new mixes. If you hate the record, I'm on your side. We won't be playing any of these songs live in support of this. We don't even consider it a re-release. Just a swap out for a better mix."

On December 3, the band announced on their official Twitter and website that they will be releasing a compilation of all of their former EPs and splits titled Sleeping on Trash, which was released on February 12. They also announced that they were done writing their new album and would be entering the studio in January.

=== The Greatest Generation (2013–2015) ===
Prior to the release of The Greatest Generation the band played 4 shows in the span of 24 hours to promote the album. The Wonder Years released their fourth LP, The Greatest Generation, on May 14, via Hopeless Records. In May 2013, The Wonder Years played all 6 dates of Slam Dunk festival in the UK and Ireland. Before embarking on the Vans Warped Tour 2013, the band played some shows with Silverstein in Canada. First week sales of The Greatest Generation more than doubled the sales of Suburbia I've Given You All and Now I'm Nothing, with a total of 19,673 copies sold. These sales placed the album at No. 20 on Billboard's Top 200 chart. In February 2015 over the course of three days, the band played anniversary shows where each night they played one of their three previous albums in full.

=== No Closer to Heaven and Burst & Decay (2015–2017) ===
On April 20, 2015, the band announced they were finished recording their fifth studio album. On June 29, the band announced No Closer to Heaven was set for release on September 4. On June 30, the band released the music video off the new record, entitled "Cardinals". On the band's website, buyers of the pre-orders are greeted with the option to donate to one of four charities, which include Puppies Behind Bars, After-School All-Stars, The Herren Project and Futures Without Violence. A music video for "Cigarettes & Saints" was released on July 31. On August 20, "I Don't Like Who I Was Then" was made available for streaming via Alternative Press. The album features Letlive's frontman Jason Aalon Butler on the track "Stained Glass Ceilings". The song's music video premiered on the band's YouTube channel on March 2, 2016. The band alluded to the start of work on a new album on New Year's Day of 2017 via Twitter, but didn't reveal a release date or album title. The band later elaborated on this announcement on April 27 of the same year, stating that two releases were on the way. On July 27, 2017, an acoustic EP, entitled Burst & Decay was revealed with a release date of September 22, 2017. The EP features seven acoustic versions of songs from either "Suburbia", "The Greatest Generation", or "No Closer to Heaven". It was also confirmed that their next LP was finished being written and would be recorded as soon as the band returned home from tour.

On December 22, 2017, the band's social media accounts began to feature a black banner with the text, "SEE YOU IN 2018", and a link to their website. In addition, the band posted in regards to upcoming material, "Turning the lights out for a bit. New record next year. If you want to be kept informed go here: hopelessrecords.com/thewonderyears. For now, we rest."

=== Sister Cities (2018–2020) ===
In January 2018, fans began receiving untitled 7-inch vinyl records in the post which held a song on one side, and a spoken word poem on the other. After searching on "Shazam" for further information, they discovered the name of the song, along with the title, artwork, and tentative track listing for the band's sixth album, Sister Cities.

A few days later, the band officially announced and confirmed this to be the title of their new album along with the release date of April 6, 2018. The music video for the first single and title track for the new album, "Sister Cities", was released on February 8, 2018. On March 9, 2018, the band uploaded a visuals video for the single "Pyramids of Salt". In 2019 the band launched The Sun Drenched Pavement Society, in which fans would receive a randomized merch item every month. After a year the program shut down. In an interview with Valentino Petrarca from The Aquarian, Dan Campbell stated the Sun Drenched Pavement Society would never return.

=== The Upsides anniversary (2020) ===
On October 23, 2020, the single "Brakeless" was released on the 10th anniversary of their album The Upsides, revisiting older, pop-punk tones. The song was released upon the success of the band's get out the vote challenge to register 1000 voters by October 20.

=== The Hum Goes on Forever (2022) ===
On April 21, 2022, the band released "Oldest Daughter", their first new material since the release of Sister Cities. After the release of their second single, "Summer Clothes", they confirmed their seventh studio album, The Hum Goes on Forever, which was released on September 22, 2022. This album consists of twelve songs, giving the listener insight and telling the story of what lead singer, Dan Campbell, experienced and went through during the COVID-19 pandemic.

== Side projects ==
=== Why Bother? ===
In April 2012, Steinborn released an EP, Some Songs, under the name Why Bother?. He later released another EP, This Isn't Very Good, on GTR Records in November 2013.

=== Aaron West & The Roaring Twenties ===
In May 2014, Campbell announced a solo project, Aaron West and the Roaring Twenties. With this project, Campbell pushed himself "to make a piece of fiction feel just as raw and personal as songs about my life". An album, We Don't Have Each Other, was released in July. Campbell performed on a few dates of the 2014 edition of Warped Tour, as well as performed on the entirety of the 2015 edition.

=== Clear Eyes Fanzine ===
Six songs about Friday Night Lights from Dan Campbell (The Wonder Years, Aaron West) and Ace Enders (The Early November, I Can Make a Mess).

=== mdk ===
In August 2017, Michael Kennedy released a 6-song EP, Cigarette, under the name mdk through GTR Records.

=== Cold Climb It ===
In 2016, Matt Brasch started his new solo project, Cold Climb It, later recruiting Eric Sable (of Birthday Boy, The Sixties), Jon Edwards (of Nexus) and Chris Mehr (of The Sixties, Nexus, The Arrangement). The four-piece released their debut EP, Fade, on March 17, 2017. They later released their second EP, In Decline, on November 15, 2019.

== Band members ==
Current

- Matt Brasch – rhythm guitar, backing and occasional lead vocals, percussion (2005–present)
- Dan "Soupy" Campbell – lead vocals, occasional rhythm guitar and ukulele (2005–present)
- Casey Cavaliere – lead guitar, backing vocals (2005–present)
- Mike Kennedy – drums, percussion (2005–2009, 2009–present)
- Josh Martin – bass, synthesizer, backing and unclean vocals (2005–present)
- Nick Steinborn – keyboards, piano, programming, rhythm guitar, backing vocals (2009–present), percussion (2009–present), drums (2009)

Former

- Mikey Kelly – keyboards, synthesizer, backing vocals (2005–2009)

== Discography ==
Studio albums

- Get Stoked on It! (2007)
- The Upsides (2010)
- Suburbia I've Given You All and Now I'm Nothing (2011)
- The Greatest Generation (2013)
- No Closer to Heaven (2015)
- Sister Cities (2018)
- The Hum Goes on Forever (2022)
