= Proper (band) =

American rock band

Proper.
- Also known as: Great Wight (2016–2019)
- Origin: Brooklyn, New York, U.S.
- Genres: Emo; pop-punk
- Years active: 2016–present
- Labels: Old Press; Big Scary Monsters; Father/Daughter
- Members: Erik Garlington; Jon Lyte; Natasha Johnson; Elijah Watson
- Website: likerealproper.com

Proper. is an American rock band from Brooklyn, New York. The band was formed in 2016 as Great Wight by lead vocalist, guitarist, and primary songwriter Erik Garlington and drummer Elijah Watson, and currently consists of Garlington, Watson, bassist and backing vocalist Natasha Johnson and guitarist Jon Lyte. The band are known for their combination of emo with lyrics exploring personal and political topics from an intersectional black and queer perspective.

Garlington and Watson recorded Great Wight's debut album The Suburbs Have Ruined My Life (2017) as a duo, with Johnson joining shortly after its release. After touring Europe, the band signed with Big Scary Monsters, after which they changed their name to Proper. and released I Spent the Winter Writing Songs About Getting Better (2019). Their third album, The Great American Novel (2022), was released through Big Scary Monsters and Father/Daughter Records.

== History ==
=== 2016–2018: Formation and The Suburbs Have Ruined My Life ===
Guitarist and vocalist Erik Garlington first began writing songs whilst living in Mississippi, and began playing shows after moving to Kansas City, Missouri, where he joined a variety of bands but felt disconnected from its scene. In 2015, he relocated from Kansas City to Brooklyn, New York, which he had visited six months earlier whilst touring with a metalcore band. With none of his former bandmates wanting to move to New York, Garlington set about forming a new band of scratch with other people of color. After two years, he became connected with people from New York's DIY scene after going to a record release show he was recommended to attend on Reddit, and was connected to drummer Elijah Watson through a mutual friend. Garlington named the band Great Wight in reference to the television series Game of Thrones. The band experienced numerous changes in personnel before being publicly announced due to Garlington's "glacial pace" of setting up the band.

Over the course of a year, Garlington and Watson rehearsed and recorded Great Wight's debut album, The Suburbs Have Ruined My Life, with Dalton Gomez performing and helping write its lead guitar parts. The album's songs were written by Garlington four to seven years prior to Great Wight's formation, and were originally conceived as acoustic folk punk before being reworked into fuller arrangements. Lyrically, it centers on his experiences of growing up in the United States' Bible Belt as a black, queer and atheist person, with around half of its songs inspired by his time living in Kansas City. The Suburbs Have Ruined My Life was surprise released on September 29, 2017, through Old Press Records. A week before the album's release, Great Wight played an acoustic show at a friend's house, where they met and recruited Natasha Johnson as their bassist. In 2018, the band performed live on The Chris Gethard Show and embarked on their first tour of England, playing at Decolonise Fest in London along the way. Whilst touring Europe with Nervus and Worriers in November 2018, Great Wight were signed to Big Scary Monsters, whom reached out to the band after the label's founder, Kevin Douch, learned that Cultdreams' Lucinda Livingstone was a mutual friend of Johnson.

=== 2019–2021: I Spent the Winter Writing Songs About Getting Better ===
In early 2019, Great Wight changed their name to Proper. to avoid confusion with the glam metal band Great White. The new name was intended as a reappropriation of remarks the members of Proper. received growing up that they "talk[ed] really proper" or like a white person, and the band felt it was more meaningful than their previous one. Thereafter, Proper. finished recording its second album, I Spent the Winter Writing Songs About Getting Better. The album was Proper.'s first to feature songwriting contributions from all members, with Garlington also playing all lead guitar parts. Garlington described its lyrics as being more hopeful and said he aimed to discuss topics relating to queer rights and himself more openly as he felt the lyrics of The Suburbs... only showed people what he hated, whilst also citing the "literal freedom" he experienced after moving to New York as an influence.

In March 2019, Proper. performed at a showcase for Big Scary Monsters at South by Southwest (SXSW). The band publicly announced their signing to the label in June 2019, and surprise released I Spent the Winter Writing Songs About Getting Better the following month to critical acclaim. Following its release, Proper. toured the United States between August and October 2019, with Alfred and Clwdwlkr supporting the band on its first leg and Mint Green on its second. In 2020, the band released "Do Over (TRT remix)", a chopped and screwed remix of "Trill Recognise Trill", and the single "Don't", which was co-produced by Dan Campbell of The Wonder Years. In March and September 2021, the band released the non-album singles "Aficionado" and "Zuko Alone", after which they toured the United States on separate tours with Tiny Moving Parts, Glass Beach and Home is Where in November.

=== 2022–present: The Great American Novel and Part-Timer ===
In March 2022, Proper. released their third album The Great American Novel, through Big Scary Monsters and Father/Daughter Records. The album was recorded and produced by Bartees Strange, with Campbell co-producing and offering writing advice, and saw the band move towards a heavier and more diverse sound displaying elements of post-hardcore, alternative rock, indie rock, and progressive rock. In a press release, Garlington described it as a concept album about "how Black genius, specifically my own, goes ignored, is relentlessly contested or just gets completely snuffed out before it can flourish", likening its protagonist to a "queer, Black Holden Caulfield-type character" growing up in the 2010s. In an interview with Ox-Fanzine, he described the album as an attempt to deconstruct the notion of the concept of the Great American Novel and "finally bring some diversity to the genre" beyond wealthy white men, "especially since it was created in a country that claims to be a melting pot of cultures and identities." (Note: Quotes are translated from the original text: "endlich etwas Vielfalt in dieses Genre zu bringen, vor allem da es in einem Land entstanden ist, das von sich behauptet, ein Schmelztiegel der Kulturen und Identitäten zu sein.") Proper. supported the album's release with a headlining tour of the United Kingdom and Europe in April and May 2022, after which they toured North America opening for Los Campesinos! in August. In December 2022, the band performed as the opening act for The Hold Steady at one of their Massive Nights shows at the Brooklyn Bowl.

In 2023, Proper. expanded into a quartet with the addition of guitarist Jon Lyte. The band spent three days recording an EP, Part-Timer, before touring Canada with Pseudo in March 2023 and the United States in August and September that year. Following the EP's release in September, Proper. began speaking with larger record labels in the run-up to recording their next album. In March 2024, Proper. were one of the earliest acts to follow Squirrel Flower in a boycott of SXSW involving more than 80 artists over the festival's sponsorship by defense contractors RTX Corporation, BAE Systems and Collins Aerospace amidst the Israeli–Palestinian conflict, which ultimately led to the festival terminating those sponsorships in June. The band instead performed at a showcase organized by the Union of Musicians and Allied Workers (UMAW) at Cheer Up Charlies in Austin, Texas, and at the Austin for Palestine Coalition's Anti-SXSW Fest outside of Austin City Hall. In May 2024, they contributed "The 90s" to the soundtrack of the Jane Schoenbrun film I Saw the TV Glow. In 2025, Proper. performed at Furnace Fest. In April 2026, the band toured the United Kingdom with Death is a Girl.

== Musical style and influences ==
From the jump, I wanted to be really punk and make white people uncomfortable. But as I got older and exited my early twenties, I would rather express the Black experience and show how beautiful it can be as a southerner, as a Black person, as a queer person, as an autistic person — and through the roots of rock music, that would be the best way to do it. I grew up listening to rap also, but I really wanted to see what I could do with a guitar and a band behind me.

— Erik Garlington in an interview with Rolling Stone, 2023

Proper. have been predominately described as emo and pop-punk, and are known for combining emo with lyrics exploring personal and political topics from an intersectional black and queer perspective, including coming-of-age, identity, sexuality, racism, and systemic oppression. Pitchfork's Ian Cohen described the band as being "explosively verbal" and believed Garlington was "trying to make the act of listening to Proper. as overwhelming as experiencing his life firsthand". In addition to his personal experiences and observations, Garlington's lyrics draw inspiration from books, films, and television series; he cited the latter as an influence on how he envisions Proper.'s studio albums, likening them to TV seasons.

The members of Proper. have cited a variety of artists as influences, including System of a Down, Kendrick Lamar, Tiny Moving Parts, Kanye West, Modern Baseball, Tyler, the Creator, Say Anything, Saosin, Dance Gavin Dance, Touché Amoré, Kississippi, and The Front Bottoms. Garlington's musical roots were based in heavy metal, progressive rock, and post-hardcore; he began listening to heavy music after his father gave him a copy of Megadeth's Countdown to Extinction (1992) when he was 11 years old, and started playing guitar when he was 12 after listening to Coheed and Cambria, whom he credited alongside At the Drive-In, Dance Gavin Dance and Protest the Hero with inspiring him to do music. He also credited The Wonder Years with showing him "you could write pop-punk and have it be meaningful and have the lyrics be amazing and blunt and still poetic at the same time." Johnson drew inspiration from early pop-punk and Long Island emo, and cited Ramones as her favorite band. Watson was primarily influenced by The Mars Volta and At the Drive-In, as well as Paramore, Taking Back Sunday, Silverstein, J Dilla, and A Tribe Called Quest.

The lyrics of Proper.'s first two albums feature numerous inside jokes and references inspired by Garlington's enjoyment of callbacks in TV shows, anime series and Dungeons & Dragons, and also contain allusions to the band's own history. The Wonder Years and their album Suburbia I've Given You All And Now I'm Nothing (2011) are notably referenced in the title and eponymous track of The Suburbs Have Ruined My Life, with former album's opening track, "Came Out Swinging", also being referenced in the lyrics of "Germany, 1991" and the title of I Spent the Winter Writing Songs About Getting Better. On The Great American Novel, Garlington largely dispensed with humour and references, stating that if the predominately white and male audiences of emo were to be "voyeur to the Black experience, [...] I want them to hear this record and learn about our identity crises, our aimlessness, how many friends and family we know that are dead or in jail by 25. How, at 8 we were told we were gifted but by 11 we were told we’re dangerous."

== Band members ==
- Erik Garlington - guitar, lead vocals (2016–present)
- Jon Lyte - guitar (2023–present)
- Natasha Johnson - bass, backing vocals (2017–present)
- Elijah Watson - drums (2016–present)

Timeline

== Discography ==
=== Studio albums ===
List of studio albums, with selected details
Title	Album details
The Suburbs Have Ruined My Life (Note: as Great Wight: reissued as Proper. in 2020)	Released: September 29, 2017; Label: Old Press; Format: CD, CS, LP, DD
I Spent the Winter Writing Songs About Getting Better	Released: July 26, 2019; Label: Big Scary Monsters; Format: CD, CS, LP, DD
The Great American Novel	Released: March 25, 2022; Label: Father/Daughter, Big Scary Monsters; Format: CD, CS, LP, DD

=== Extended plays ===
List of EPs, with selected details
Title	Album details
Part-Timer	Released: September 8, 2023; Label: Father/Daughter; Format: DD

=== Singles ===
List of singles
Title	Year	Album	Ref.
"A$AP Rocky Type Beat"	2019	I Spent the Winter Writing Songs About Getting Better	
"Bragging Rights" (featuring Willow Hawks)	2019	I Spent the Winter Writing Songs About Getting Better	
"Don't"	2020	Non-album singles	
"Aficionado"	2021	Non-album singles	
"Zuko Alone"	2021	Non-album singles	
"Red, White & Blue"	2021	The Great American Novel	
"Milk & Honey"	2022	The Great American Novel	
"Huerta"	2022	The Great American Novel	
"Jean"	2022	The Great American Novel	
"Potential"	2023	Part-Timer	
"The 90s"	2024	I Saw the TV Glow (Original Soundtrack)	

=== Music videos ===
List of music videos, with directors, along with albums
Title	Year	Director(s)	Album	Ref.
"A$AP Rocky Type Beat"	2019	Christopher Salyers	I Spent the Winter Writing Songs About Getting Better	
"Bragging Rights"	2019	Nikki Austin	I Spent the Winter Writing Songs About Getting Better	
"Fucking Disgusting"	2019	Nikki Austin	I Spent the Winter Writing Songs About Getting Better	
"Red, White & Blue"	2021	Erik Garlington	The Great American Novel	
"Milk & Honey" (Note: Unlisted)	2022	Erik Garlington	The Great American Novel	
"Jean"	2023	Jeffrey Muldinger	The Great American Novel	
"Middle Management"	2024	Christopher Salyers	Part-Timer	
