= The First Glass Beach Album =

Studio album by Glass Beach
- Released: May 18, 2019
- Studio: Multiple members' home studios
- Genres: Indie rock; emo; art rock; power pop; pop-punk; indietronica; neo-psychedelia; new wave
- Length: 60:00
- Label: Run for Cover RFC-204
- Producer: J McClendon

Glass Beach chronology
The First Glass Beach Album (2019)	Alchemist Rats Beg Bashful (Remixes) (2021)

Singles from The First Glass Beach Album
- 1. "Orchids" Released: November 11, 2021

The First Glass Beach Album (stylized in lowercase) is the debut studio album by Seattle–based indie band Glass Beach, which comprised Autumn "Classic J" J. McClendon on vocals, William White on drums, Jonas Newhouse on bass, and Layne Smith on lead guitar. The album was self-released by Glass Beach on 18 May 2019, and re-released on 24 January 2020 upon the band being signed with Run for Cover Records.

The album was worked on for three years, starting from when the band was formed, and the songs in the album went through multiple iterations until they were finished. The album was compared to other artists in the emo genre, as well as punk and chiptune. A remix album, titled alchemist rats beg bashful (remixes), was released in February 2021, including remixes from Bartees Strange, Skylar Spence, Dogleg, Backxwash, Pinkshift, and other artists.

== Background ==
Glass Beach was formed when vocalist and band leader Autumn McClendon's solo musical project Casio Dad caught the attention of bassist Jonas Newhouse and drummer William White, who moved to Los Angeles to join the band in 2015. The trio began making music together, working on their debut record for three years. The band later recruited lead guitarist Layne Smith to re-record some of McClendon's parts in the album.

Before the band formed, McClendon had already had the idea of making the album's first track, "classic j dies and goes to hell part 1". She claims that the track was one of the first to be started and the last to be finished, saying that "we always wanted to have that song go through a bunch of different sounds and we tried so many different sounds for it." She further claims that the band "roughly had an idea of where most of the songs were going to be from the moment we started writing them". McClendon stated that the band, during the making of the album, was "never trying to make something that a lot of people would like, we were just doing what we wanted to do", while they were fully aware that the album's sound was "weird". She further claims that during the production of the album, "most of the songs would go through literally hundreds of versions".

== Music ==
The first track of the album, "classic j dies and goes to hell part 1", according to Pitchfork's Abby Jones, is "a jazzy opus best described as The Black Parade off Broadway", calling it "the most overblown track" on the album. Paste's Scott Russell describes the song as opening up into "an irresistible prog-pop jam, downshifts into a hushed, horn-accentuated bridge, and then throttles back up into full-on power-punk thrash". Jones called the album a "whirlwind of post-emo maximalism, fusing mid-aughts pop-punk with synthy, sugarcoated chiptune", separating electro-punk tracks like "bedroom community", "dallas" and "yoshi's island" with instrumental ones. bedroom community, according to Jones, is a traditional piano solo split up between parts that Jones compares to video game soundtracks. McClendon describes the core concept of "bedroom community" as "the idea of people themselves being commodities." Ian Cohen of Stereogum interprets the track "bedroom community" as seeing "the human cost in trying to build an online scene in that manner — the influencer who’s emboldened to 'monetize her suffering.'" Jones compares the tenth track, "dallas" with Midwest emo before the track launches into synths. Newhouse describes the sound of the track "yoshi's island" as "this bossa nova song that doesn’t stay bossa nova for very long."

McClendon saw the music of the album as "genreless", with Smith describing it as "post-emo". The Washington Post's Hau Chu described the album as something that "shuffles through jazz and synth-prog-rock and what sound like sweeping video game scores." McClendon was originally bitter over the band's comparison to chiptune, but she has "gotten over it". Jones compares the sound of the album to bands like 100 gecs, Brave Little Abacus, American Football, and The Octopus Project, while emphasizing that "nothing on glass beach sounds copied and pasted". Ian Cohen of Stereogum called the album "a painstakingly sequenced hour of prog-like song suites, hypercolored pop-punk bursts, and glitchy interludes", further comparing the album to Radiohead, The Brave Little Abacus, and Jeff Rosenstock. McClendon stated that she was influenced by jazz musicians like Bill Evans, comparing Evans's sound to that on the piano part of "classic j dies and goes to hell part 1", as well as punk musicians like the Ging Nang Boyz and Rosenstock. The band further noted in an interview with Michael Brooks from The Alternative that they have heard comparisons to different artists such as Of Montreal that they had not listened to until after the release of the album, but that they thought was comparable in sound to their own. Stereogum's Chris DeVille compared the album to "peak-eccentricity Of Montreal reimagined as peak-audacity fourth-wave emo and then remixed by peak-accessibility PC Music. Or maybe if The Unicorns wrote a post-rock symphony about a jazz band that goes to war with a synth-pop band".

== Release and reception ==
Professional ratings
Review scores
Source	Rating
Pitchfork	7.2/10

The album was first released on Bandcamp on 18 May 2019. According to Cohen, the album gained traction on Twitter and emo message boards, becoming an "overnight sensation". Chu described the fans of the band as a "cultish online following". The band's fans grew their popularity to the point that Run For Cover Records signed the band and reissued the album on vinyl 8 months after its release.

Pitchfork gave the album a 7.2 rating out of 10, calling it "bizarrely inventive" and praising their confident delivery of lyrics, but saying that they fall short "when their subject matter starts to rely on hackneyed mid-aughts emo tropes". Critic Anthony Fantano gave the album a 7 out of 10, calling it "one of the most creative efforts in emo and power pop this decade" despite "rough edges", something to which McClendon and Newhouse said was one of the most surreal moments to happen since the album has released. Stereogum put the band on its list of the 40 best new bands of 2019.

== Track listing ==
No.	Title	Length
1.	"Classic J Dies and Goes to Hell Part 1"	5:04
2.	"Bedroom Community"	6:01
3.	"(Forever?????????)"	1:48
4.	"Bone Skull"	2:29
5.	"Neon Glow"	3:53
6.	"Cold Weather"	2:18
7.	"Calico"	2:11
8.	"Glass Beach"	7:21
9.	"(Blood Rivers)"	1:35
10.	"Dallas"	7:01
11.	"(Rat Castle)"	2:47
12.	"Planetarium"	4:33
13.	"Soft!!!!!!"	2:06
14.	"Yoshi's Island"	6:19
15.	"Orchids"	4:34
Total length:		60:00

Notes

- Track titles are stylized in lowercase
- "Orchids" ends at 3:39, with the remainder being silence
