= Great American Novel (disambiguation) =

Great American Novel is the concept of a novel that perfectly represents the spirit of the age in the United States at the time of its publication.

Great American Novel may also refer to:

== Books that use this title ==
- The Great American Novel (1923) by William Carlos Williams
- The Great American Novel (1938) by Clyde Brion Davis
- The Great American Novel (Roth novel) (1973) by Philip Roth
- The Great American Novel (2000) by Keith Malley

== Other titles ==
- The Great American Novel (1972), a song by Larry Norman on the album Only Visiting This Planet
- The Great American Novel (album), a 2022 studio album by Proper
