= Sadurn =

American indie rock band

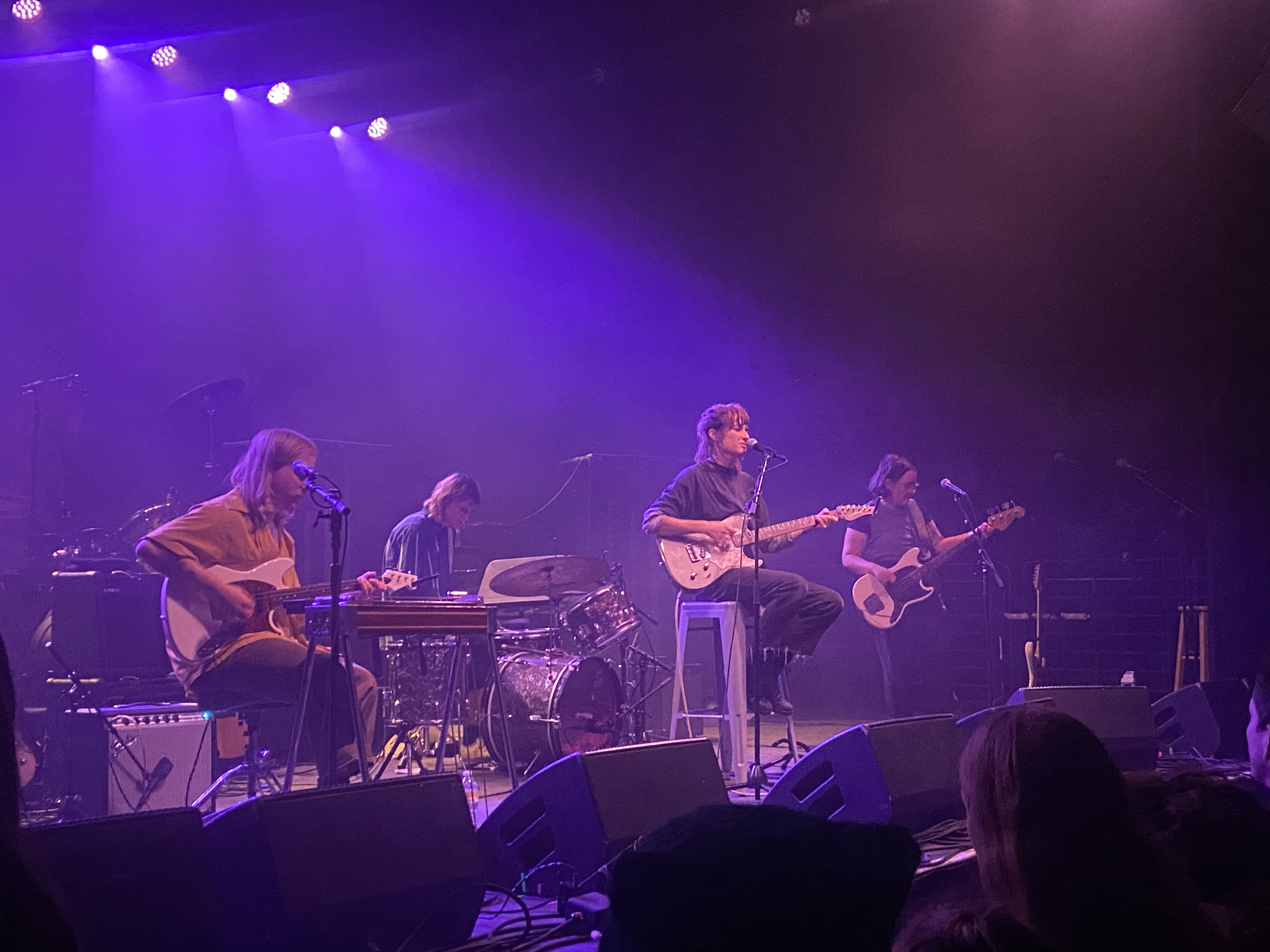
- Sadurn performing at Union Transfer in 2022

Background information
- Origin: Philadelphia, Pennsylvania
- Genre: Indie folk
- Years active: 2017–present
- Labels: Dead Definition, Run for Cover
- Members: G DeGroot; Jon Cox; Amelia Swain; Tabitha Ahnert

Sadurn is an American indie folk band from Philadelphia, Pennsylvania.

== History ==
The band started as a solo project of G DeGroot in 2017 shortly after they had begun learning guitar and writing songs. Jon Cox joined the project later that year on accompanying guitar, and the two began circling the Philadelphia DIY scene as an acoustic duo. In 2019 Sadurn released two EPs through local label Dead Definition, one entitled “Gleam” and the other a split with the band Ther. In 2020, the duo expanded, with DeGroot's friend Amelia Swain joining as drummer as well as Tabitha Ahnert as bassist. In February 2022, the group announced their debut album titled Radiator, to be released through Run for Cover Records. The album was released on May 6, 2022. The band has been dubbed "The Best of What's Next" by Paste.

In 2024, Sadurn contributed the song "How Can I Get Out" to the soundtrack for the film I Saw the TV Glow. Director Jane Schoenbrun said of the band: " whenever I'm out in New York in hip music circles, all of the queer, trans, non-binary people with good taste will just be like, 'You've got Sadurn?' in the way others will talk to me about Phoebe Bridgers [who is also featured on the soundtrack]."

The band tours live, performing on bills with artists like Greg Freeman, Horse Jumper of Love, Babehoven, Tiberius, and Sleeper's Bell, as well as live session for Audiotree in 2022, and a set at All Things Go Music Festival 2025.

Sadurn's second album, The Underworld, was released on October 16, 2026. The album's lead single "whole thing," was released June 29, 2026, accompanied with a music video by Quinn Kessel.

== Discography ==
=== Studio albums ===
- Radiator (2022, Run for Cover Records)
- The Underworld (2026, Run for Cover Records)

=== EPs ===
- Friends with your Friends (2017)
- Gleam (2019)

=== Splits ===
- Sadurn/Ther (2019)

=== Guest appearances ===
- "How can I Get Out" on I Saw the TV Glow (Original Soundtrack) (2024, A24 Music)
