= Plastic Death =

Studio album by Glass Beach
- Released: January 19, 2024
- Genre: Progressive rock
- Length: 63:11
- Label: Run for Cover

Glass Beach chronology
Alchemist Rats Beg Bashful (Remixes) (2021)	Plastic Death (2024)

Singles from Plastic Death
- 1. "The CIA" Released: October 11, 2023; 2. "Rare Animal" Released: November 6, 2023

Plastic Death (stylized in lowercase) is the second and final studio album by American indie rock band Glass Beach. It was released on January 19, 2024, by Run for Cover Records. The album saw the band move primarily into progressive rock, leaving behind the emo of their debut album, The First Glass Beach Album. It was preceded by two singles, "The CIA" and "Rare Animal". Collaborators on the album include "secret fifth member" Daxe Schaeffer, Jer Hunter, and mastering engineer Will Yip. The album was positively received by critics.

== Release ==
After a series of teasers from the band and their label, Glass Beach released the album's lead single, "The CIA", on October 11, 2023. The song came with a music video directed by the band's drummer William White. The song was described as "almost alt-rock-radio-ready" but without "compromising their proggy, exploratory tendencies", "zany, shapeshifting art pop", and as existing "in a strange space, someplace where prog, post-punk, and jazz coalesce".

The album was announced on November 6, 2023, set for release on January 19, 2024, by Run for Cover Records. The announcement came with the second single, "Rare Animal". The song includes gang vocals from the full band and their "secret fifth member Daxe", which vocalist Autumn McClendon likened to a Greek chorus.

== Style ==
Though pulling from a variety of genres, Plastic Death is primarily considered a progressive rock album. Other genres include jazz fusion, alternative rock, and progressive metal. The album notably leaves behind the emo sound that defined The First Glass Beach Album.

== Reception ==
Plastic Death ratings
Review scores
Source	Rating
Exclaim!	7/10
Paste	7.6/10

Stereogum and Treble both named Plastic Death as their "album of the week" ahead of its release. Stereogum's Chris DeVille called Plastic Death a "rare sophomore album feat" and "an entirely new phase of evolution for the band." Treble's Jeff Terich wrote that the "beauty of a record with Plastic Death is that the restraint is always temporary; give them time to get there, and Glass Beach will prove just what kind of masterful bedlam they can stir up." Rachel Evangeline Chiong of Exclaim! described it as "a monolith of an album, narratively entwined front to back." Paste reviewer Grant Sharples stated that "on paper, it may seem like an unfocused mess, but they execute everything with stylistic flair." Consequence's Abby Jones called the album "a vivid, moving, yet realistic examination on the world at large". Flood Magazine's Will Schube called the album's sound "tantalizing, a little scary, and wholly wondrous". Critics also praised the work of mastering engineer Will Yip.

=== Year-end lists ===
Publication	Rank	Ref.
Stereogum	44	

== Track listing ==
All tracks are written by Autumn McClendon, Jonas Newhouse, Layne Smith, and William White.

Plastic Death track listing
No.	Title	Length
1.	"Coelacanth"	6:34
2.	"Motions"	3:32
3.	"Slip Under the Door"	5:28
4.	"Guitar Song"	2:28
5.	"Rare Animal"	4:38
6.	"Cul-de-Sac"	4:35
7.	"Whalefall"	4:10
8.	"Puppy"	3:17
9.	"The Killer"	4:13
10.	"The CIA"	4:42
11.	"200"	3:49
12.	"Commatose"	9:49
13.	"Abyss Angel"	5:56
Total length:		63:11

Notes

- Every song is stylized in all lowercase letters, except for "The CIA" which is stylized as "the CIA".

== Personnel ==
=== Glass Beach ===
- Autumn McClendon – lead vocals, guitar, piano, synthesizer, theremin, gang vocals
- Layne Smith – guitar, gang vocals, spoken word (1)
- Jonas Newhouse – bass, keyboard, synthesizer, gang vocals
- William White – drums, gang vocals

=== Additional musicians ===
- Daxe Schaeffer – gang vocals
- Jer Hunter – trumpet (2, 11), trombone (2, 11)
- Tony Sanders – trumpet (1, 2), trombone (1)
- Tommy Pedrini – marimba (1, 7)
- Camille Faulkner – violin (9, 12)

=== Technical ===
- Will Yip – mastering engineer
- Autumn McClendon – arrangements, additional art, packaging design
- Rat Castle Recordings (McClendon and Smith) – recording engineers, mixing engineers
- Chioko Yamasato – additional engineering (marimba recordings)
- Daxe Schaeffer – album cover, additional art, packaging design
