= Love Me Forever =

Love Me Forever may refer to:

- Love Me Forever (film), a 1935 American drama film
- "Love Me Forever" (song), a 1957 song by the Four Esquires
- Love Me Forever (Motörhead), a 1991 song by the British band Motörhead on their album 1916
- Love Me Forever (Wanda Jackson album), a 1963 album by Wanda Jackson
- Love Me Forever (Pinkshift album), a 2022 album by Pinkshift
- "Love Me Forever", a song by Lil Yachty from the album Lil Boat 2
- "Love me forever!". a 2026 song by singer Ado, part of the soundtrack of the video game Rhythm Heaven Groove
