= Viewing (album) =

Studio album by Stay Inside
- Released: April 10, 2020
- Genre: Emo; post-hardcore; post-punk
- Length: 34:18
- Label: No Sleep
- Producer: Jon Markson

Stay Inside chronology
The Final Girl (2019)	Viewing (2020)	Ferried Away (2024)

Singles from Viewing
- 1. "Monuments" Released: April 2, 2020; 2. "Ivy" Released: April 2, 2020

Professional ratings
Review scores
Source	Rating
Exclaim!	8/10
Original Rock	Positive
Pitchfork	7.7/10
Punknews.org	4/5 stars
Sound Board	6/10
Sputnikmusic	4.0/5

Viewing is the debut studio album by American post-hardcore band Stay Inside. The album was released on April 10, 2020 through No Sleep Records.

== Track listing ==
All music is composed by Vishnu Anantha, Chris Johns, Chris Lawless, and Bryn Nieboer except where noted.

No.	Title	Music	Length
1.	"Revisionist"		4:06
2.	"Void"	Anantha; Johns; Kelly; Lawless; Tawnya Moraga; Nieboer	3:53
3.	"Ivy"		2:41
4.	"Monuments"		3:20
5.	"Silt"		4:18
6.	"Divide"		2:36
7.	"Wake"		3:17
8.	"Veil"		2:31
9.	"Verdict"	Anantha; Johns; Lawless; Nieboer; Bartees Strange	4:03
10.	"Leave"		2:31
Total length:			34:18

== Personnel ==
- Vishnu Anantha — Drums, Artwork
- Chris Johns — Guitar + Vocals
- Chris Lawless — Guitar + Screams
- Bryn Nieboer — Bass + Vocals
- Jon Markson — Producer
- Alan Douches — Mastering
