= Ferried Away =

Studio album by Stay Inside
- Released: February 28, 2024
- Studios: Brooklyn Recording Paradise; The Thunder Palace
- Genres: Emo; post-hardcore; post-punk
- Length: 32:05
- Producer: Brian DiMeglio

Stay Inside chronology
Viewing (2020)	Ferried Away (2024)	Lunger (2025)

Singles from Ferried Away
- 1. "An Invitation" Released: September 13, 2023; 2. "Sweet Stripe!" Released: November 1, 2023; 3. "My Fault" Released: January 24, 2024

Professional ratings
Review scores
Source	Rating
New Noise	3/5 stars
Spectrum Culture	78/100
WMSC	Positive
XSNoize	3.5/5 stars

Ferried Away is the second studio album by American post-punk band, Stay Inside. The album was self-released on February 28, 2024.

== Track listing ==
All music is composed by Vishnu Anantha, Chris Johns, Chris Lawless, and Bryn Nieboer.

No.	Title	Length
1.	"Bon Zs"	4:37
2.	"Learn to Float"	2:41
3.	"A Backyard"	3:34
4.	"An Invitation"	5:33
5.	"A Town to Give up In"	3:32
6.	"My Fault"	2:27
7.	"When's the Last Time?"	3:26
8.	"Sweet Stripe!"	3:07
9.	"Steeplechase"	3:08
Total length:		32:05

== Personnel ==
Stay Inside

- Chris Johns — vocals
- Bryn Nieboer — guitar
- Vishnu Anantha — bass, layout
- Chris Lawless — drums

Additional contributors

- Brian DiMeglio — production
- Mike Watts — mixing
- Adam Cichocki — mastering
- Matt Hull — trumpet
- Dave Levy — trumpet
- Daniel Busa — trumpet
- Siddhu Anandalingam — alto saxophone
- K-NOR — illustrations, layout
