= Horror (Bartees Strange album) =

Studio album by Bartees Strange
- Released: February 14, 2025
- Length: 42:14
- Label: 4AD
- Producer: Bartees Strange; Jack Antonoff; Jake Bowman; Dave Cerminara; Chris Connors; notcharles; Graham Richman; Lawrence Rothman; Yves Rothman; Spencer Stewart; Subp Yao

Bartees Strange chronology
Farm to Table (2022)	Horror (2025)

Singles from Horror
- 1. "Lie 95" Released: July 10, 2024; 2. "Sober" Released: October 1, 2024; 3. "Too Much" Released: October 31, 2024; 4. "Wants Needs" Released: January 14, 2025; 5. "Backseat Banton" Released: February 12, 2025

Horror is the third studio album by American musician Bartees Strange. It was released by 4AD on February 14, 2025, and was met with positive critical reception.

== Release ==
On July 10, 2024, the album's first single, "Lie 95", was released. On October 1, 2024, Strange announced the album and its release date, alongside the single "Sober". The album's third single, "Too Much", was released on October 31, 2024. "Wants Needs", the album's fourth single, was released on January 14, 2025. Strange released the album's last single, "Backseat Banton" on February 12, 2025.

== Composition ==
Horror was co-produced by Jack Antonoff.

== Critical reception ==
Professional ratings
Aggregate scores
Source	Rating
Metacritic	81/100
Review scores
Source	Rating
Clash	8/10
Dork	5/5
Far Out	3.5/5 stars
The Line of Best Fit	7/10
The Observer	3/5 stars
Paste	7.4/10
Pitchfork	6.5/10
PopMatters	9/10
The Skinny	5/5 stars
Under the Radar	9/10

According to the review aggregator Metacritic, Horror received "universal acclaim" based on a weighted average score of 81 out of 100 from 8 critic scores. It received positive reviews from PopMatters, The Line of Best Fit, Clash, Under the Radar, and The Skinny.

== Track listing ==
No.	Title	Writer(s)	Producer(s)	Length
1.	"Too Much"	Bartees Cox; Graham Richman	Bartees Strange; Jack Antonoff; Richman	3:34
2.	"Hit It Quit It"	Cox; Richman	Strange; Jake Bowman; Lawrence Rothman; Yves Rothman	2:39
3.	"Sober"	Cox; Steph Marziano	Strange; Antonoff; L. Rothman; Y. Rothman	3:41
4.	"Baltimore"	Cox	Strange	4:05
5.	"Lie 95"	Cox; Kacy Hill; Charles Franklin Thompson	Strange; Notcharles	2:41
6.	"Wants Needs"	Cox; Marziano	Strange; Connors; Antonoff	4:58
7.	"Lovers"	Cox	Strange; Dave Cerminara; Subp Yao	3:54
8.	"Doomsday Buttercup"	Cox	Strange; Antonoff	2:47
9.	"17"	Cox; Marziano	Strange; Antonoff; L. Rothman; Y. Rothman	3:50
10.	"Loop Defenders"	Cox; Marziano	Strange; Connors	3:28
11.	"Norf Gun"	Cox; Andre Gainey; Vonne Parks	Strange; Bowman; Spencer Stewart	3:00
12.	"Backseat Banton"	Cox; Marziano	Strange; Connors; Antonoff	3:31
Total length:				42:14

== Personnel ==
Credits adapted from Tidal.

=== Musicians ===
- Bartees Strange – vocals (all tracks), bass guitar (tracks 1, 2, 7, 10, 12), programming (1, 5, 7, 8, 10, 12), acoustic guitar (3–5, 8), piano (6), electric guitar (9)
- Graham Richman – piano (tracks 1–3, 9, 12), programming (1, 5, 7, 12), synthesizer (6, 7, 10)
- Victor Indrizzo – drums (tracks 1, 2, 9)
- Jack Antonoff – drums (tracks 1, 6), acoustic guitar (3), programming (6, 8), bass guitar (8), synthesizer (9), piano (12)
- Daniel Kleederman – electric guitar (tracks 3, 4, 6, 9)
- Chris Connors – acoustic guitar (track 3), bass guitar (4, 9), programming (10)
- Jordyn Blakely – drums (tracks 3, 6, 10, 12)
- John Daise – bass guitar (tracks 3, 6)
- Zem Audu – saxophone (tracks 3, 8)
- Joe Kennedy – bass guitar (track 3)
- Sara Galdes – drums (track 4)
- Christina Lieberson – piano (track 4)
- Bobby Hawk – strings (tracks 5, 9)
- Notcharles – bass guitar, programming (track 5)
- Charles Gibbs – vocals (track 5)
- Kacy Hill – vocals (track 5)
- Dave Cerminara – programming (track 7)
- Subp Yao – programming (track 7)
- Sam Dew – vocals (track 8)
- Homer Steinweiss – drums (track 10)
- Spencer Stewart – bass guitar (track 11)
- Jake Bowman – synthesizer (track 11)

=== Technical ===
- Ruairi O'Flaherty – mastering
- Andrew Scheps – mixing (tracks 1–11)
- Don Godwin – mixing (track 12)
- Chris Connors – engineering (tracks 1–3, 6, 9, 10)
- Lawrence Rothman – engineering (tracks 1–3, 6, 9)
- Jesse Newport – engineering (tracks 1–3, 8)
- Laura Sisk – engineering (tracks 1, 3, 6, 8, 9, 12)
- Oli Jacobs – engineering (tracks 1, 3, 6, 8, 9, 12)
- Jack Antonoff – engineering (tracks 1, 6, 8, 9, 12)
- Nancy Conforti – engineering (tracks 2, 6, 10)
- John Brooks – engineering (tracks 3, 6, 10)
- Vishal Nayak – engineering (track 4)
- Bartees Strange – engineering (tracks 5, 7–12)
- Notcharles – engineering (track 5)
- Dave Cerminara – engineering (track 7)
- Jake Bowman – engineering (track 11)
- Spencer Stewart – engineering (track 11)
