= Say Goodbye to Pretty Boy =

2020 EP by Bartees Strange

EP by Bartees Strange
- Released: March 13, 2020
- Studio: Strange Land Studios; Washington, D. C.; United States; Black Lodge Recording, Brooklyn, New York City, New York, United States
- Genre: Indie rock
- Length: 36:31
- Language: English
- Label: Brassland

Bartees Strange chronology
Say Goodbye to Pretty Boy (2020)	Live Forever (2020)

Say Goodbye to Pretty Boy is a 2020 EP by Bartees Strange, covering songs by The National. It was reissued as a deluxe edition 2024. The digital version was seven tracks rather than five tracks long and included an extended version of "Looking for Astronauts." The new vinyl edition included a bonus track: "Lemonworld" (Live at Studio 4).

== Critical reception ==
Emily Fox of Exclaim! rated this EP an eight out of 10, calling it "a beautiful, radical, and poignant political album". The album was released on the digital platform Bandcamp, which promoted the release with a review that characterizes this recording as taking "all of the original ingredients and uses a completely different recipe to create a new, distinct flavor".

== Track listing ==
1. "About Today" (Matt Berninger and Aaron Dessner) – 3:48
2. "Lemonworld" (Matt Berninger and Bryce Dessner) – 3:16
3. "Mr. November" (Matt Berninger and Aaron Dessner) – 4:13
4. "The Geese of Beverly Road" (Matt Berninger, Aaron Dessner, and Scott Devendorf) – 3:24
5. "All the Wine" (Matt Berninger, Aaron Dessner, Bryce Dessner, Bryan Devendorf, and Scott Devendorf) – 2:46
6. "A Reasonable Man (I Don't Mind)" (Padma Newsome) – 4:54
7. "Looking for Astronauts" (Matt Berninger, Bryce Dessner, and Scott Devendorf) – 4:09
8. "Lemonworld" (Live at Studio 4 - vinyl only) (Matt Berninger and Bryce Dessner)

== Personnel ==
Musicians

- Bartees Strange
- Brian Demeglio
- Ceilidh Gao
- Dan Kleederman
- Brian Turnmire
- Dillon Treacy
- Carter Zumtobel

Technical personnel

- Chris Connors – mastering and mixing
- Brian Dimeglio – engineering
- Spencer Murphy – production and engineering
- Graham Richman – production and engineering
- Bartees Strange – engineering
- Carter Zumtobel – engineering
