= Pinkshift =

American rock band

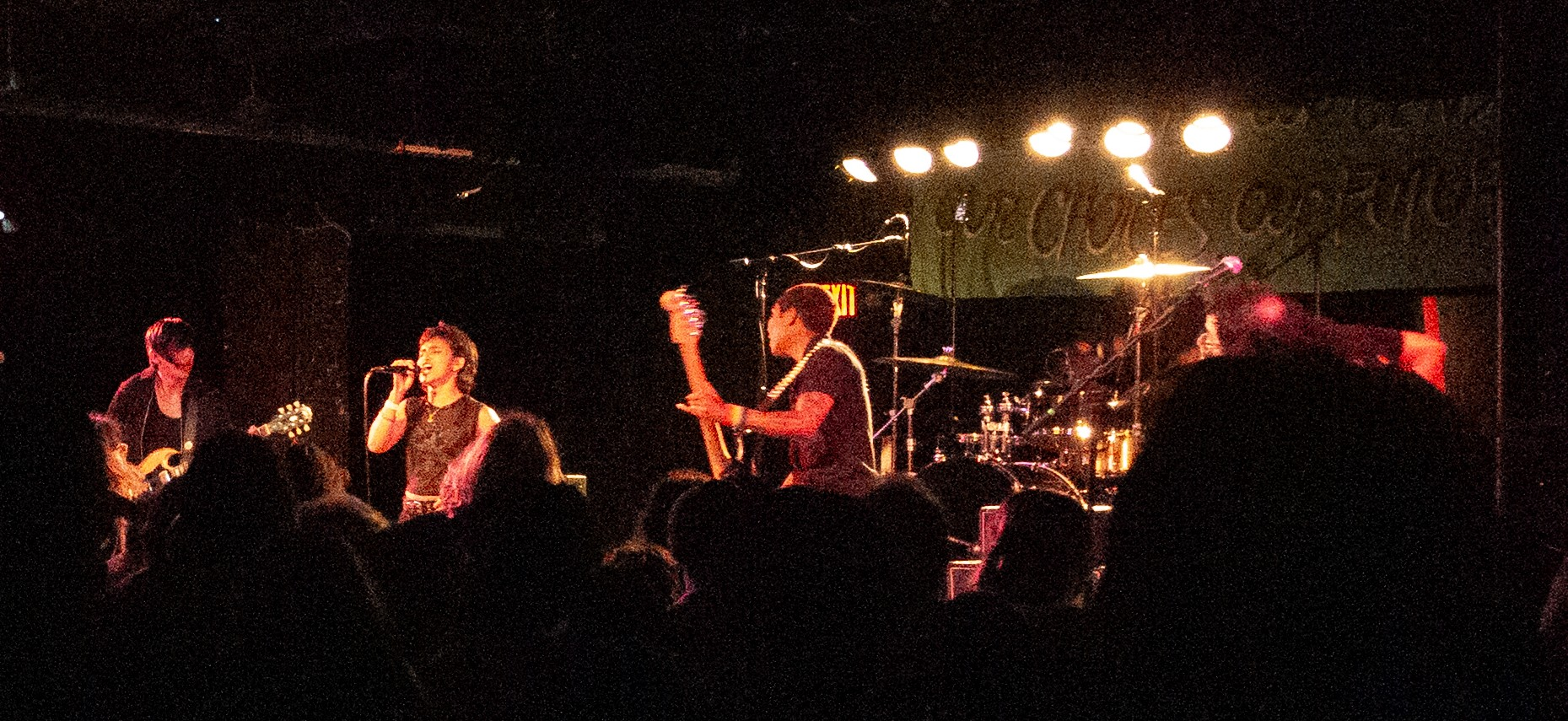
- Pinkshift performing at Liberation Weekend, 2025

Background information
- Origin: Baltimore, Maryland, U.S.
- Genres: Pop punk; grunge; emo
- Years active: 2019–present
- Label: Hopeless Records
- Members: Ashrita Kumar; Paul Vallejo; Myron Houngbedji
- Past members: Erich Weinroth
- Website: pinkshiftmd.com

Pinkshift is an American rock band, consisting since 2022 of lead vocalist Ashrita Kumar, guitarist Paul Vallejo, and drummer Myron Houngbedji. The band formed in Baltimore, Maryland in 2019, after the three members met at Johns Hopkins University and began writing music. Their music has been described as pop-punk with "elements of grunge and alt rock", with the band having cited Nirvana, Arctic Monkeys, and No Doubt as musical influences.

Pinkshift's rise to fame began after their second single, "i'm gonna tell my therapist on you", went viral on Reddit in 2020. They have since released three extended plays and two studio albums: Love Me Forever (2022), and Earthkeeper (2025). The band has garnered attention for its ethnically diverse members.

== History ==
In 2018, Ashrita Kumar and Paul Vallejo met at Johns Hopkins University during a school event. The two wrote demos under the name Sugar Crisis, releasing their first demo song "Mars" in 2019. Looking to start a band, the pair desired to find a drummer. To do this, the pair waited outside the drumming practice room on campus, eventually finding and recruiting Myron Houngbedji. The group, renaming themselves to Pinkshift after the redshift phenomenon, began performing in events around Johns Hopkins University. The group subsequently found Erich Weinroth after Kumar and Vallejo set up profiles on the dating app Tinder in search of a bassist.

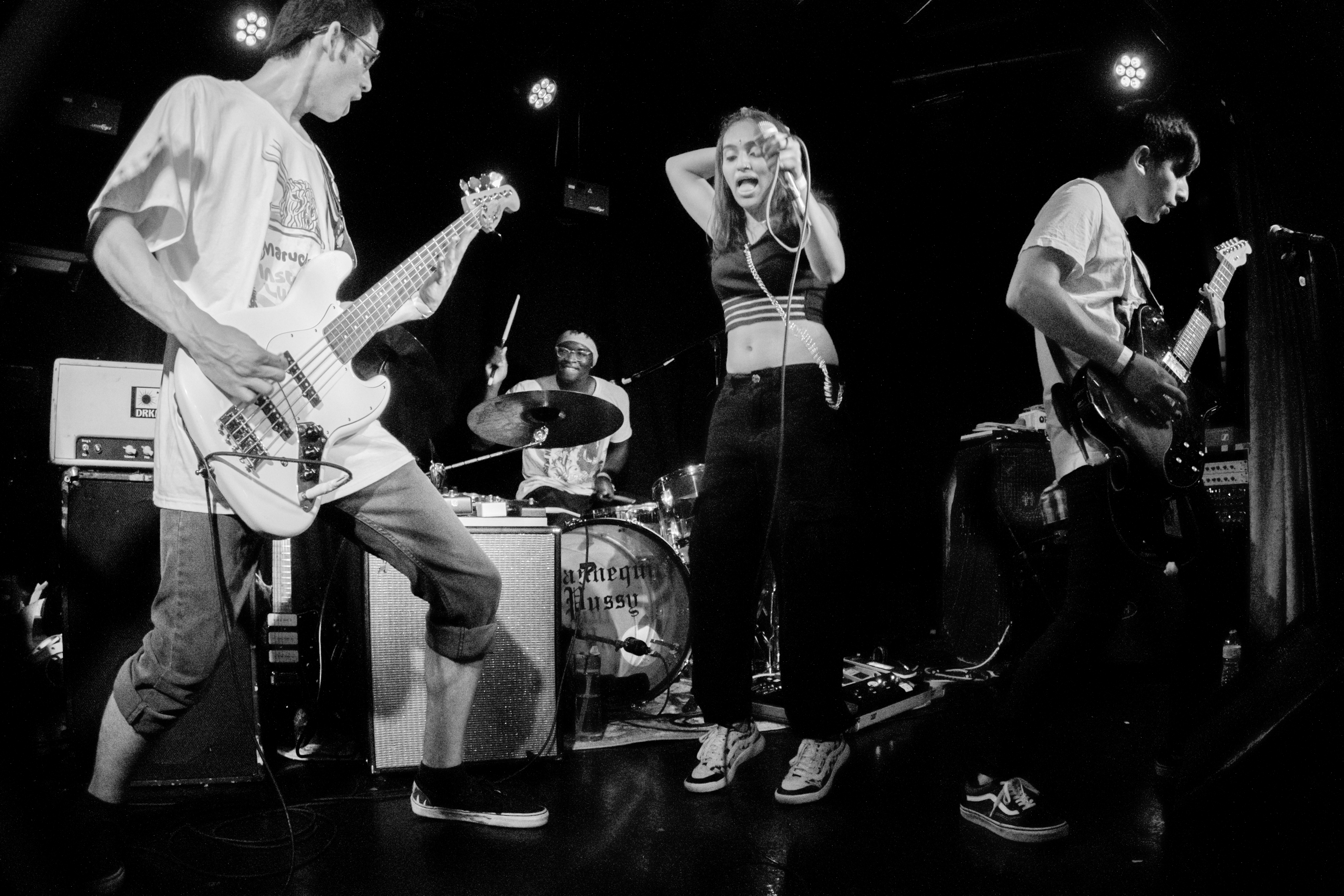
Pinkshift performing at Chop Suey in September 2021

On March 13, 2020, Pinkshift released their debut single "On Thin Ice". However, the band's next single, "i'm gonna tell my therapist on you," released on July 31, 2020, marked the beginning of their rise to fame after the song went viral on Reddit and various punk musicians, like Chris No. 2 from Anti-Flag, showed support for the band. On April 2, 2021, the band released their debut extended play Saccharine to strong reviews from critics. These reviews convinced the band members to pursue a career in music, over continuing higher education. On December 31, 2021, the band announced on Twitter that Weinroth was removed from the band's lineup due to cultural and musical differences.

Pinkshift's debut album, Love Me Forever, was released on October 21, 2022, via Hopeless Records. The record received positive reviews from critics, who noted how the album was "sharp, skilful [sic], and bristling with infectious energy". In October 2023, the band released their second EP Suraksha. In November and December 2023, the band performed as an opening act for Pussy Riot during their North American tour. Pinkshift also performed alongside The Gaslight Anthem during certain shows of the latter's 2024 North American tour, and opened for the Linda Lindas on their 2025 North American tour. On June 10, 2025, Pinkshift announced that their second studio album, Earthkeeper, would be released later that year on August 29.

== Artistry ==
Kerrang! has described Pinkshift's sound as "blending pop-punk with elements of grunge and alt rock", with "whispers of all sorts of rock and punk influences". Pinkshift has used their platform to advocate for racial diversity, Palestine, and gender inclusivity (owing to Kumar identifying as non-binary).

== Discography ==
=== Albums ===
- Love Me Forever (2022)
- Earthkeeper (2025)

=== EPs ===
- Saccharine (2021)
- Suraksha (2023)
- love me for the summer (with caco) (2024)

=== Singles ===
- "On Thin Ice" (2020)
- "i'm gonna tell my therapist on you" (2020)
- "Rainwalk" (2020)
- "bathroom community" (with Glass Beach) (2021)
- "nothing (in my head)" (2022)
- "i'm not crying you're crying" (2022)
- "GET OUT" (2022)
- "in a breath" (2022)
- "to me" (2023)
- "home" (2023)
- "EAT YOUR FRIENDS" (with Jhariah) (2023)
- "Knead" (cover of Knead by Illuminati Hotties) (2024)
- "ONE NATION" (2024)
- "Evil Eye" (2025)
- "Anita Ride" (2025)
- "Vacant" (2025)
- "Don't Fight" (2025)
- "Reflection" (2025)
- "Authority Problem" (2025)
- "Snow" (2025)
- "when we were friends" (2026)

=== Music videos ===
- "i'm gonna tell my therapist on you" (2020)
- "Mars" (2021)
- "nothing in my head" (2022)
- "Get Out" (2022)
- "To Me" (2023)
- "Eat Your Friends" (2023)
- "ONE NATION" (2024)
- "Evil Eye" (2025)
- "Anita Ride" (2025)
- "Vacant" (2025)
- "Don't Fight" (2025)
- "Reflection" (2025)

== Nominations ==
Heavy Music Awards

Year	Nominee / work	Award	Result	Ref.
2022	Pinkshift	Best International Breakthrough Band	Nominated	

Kerrang! Awards

Year	Nominee / work	Award	Result	Ref.
2022	Pinkshift	New Noise Award	Nominated	
