= Earthkeeper =

Studio album by Pinkshift
- Released: August 29, 2025
- Recorded: November 2024 – January 2025
- Studio: The Barber Shop (Hopatcong)
- Length: 40:18
- Label: Hopeless
- Producer: Brett Romnes

Pinkshift chronology
Suraksha (2023)	Earthkeeper (2025)

Singles from Earthkeeper
- 1. "Evil Eye" Released: April 18, 2025; 2. "Anita Ride" Released: June 10, 2025; 3. "Vacant" Released: July 8, 2025; 4. "Don't Fight / Reflection" Released: August 5, 2025

Professional ratings
Review scores
Source	Rating
Distorted Sound	7/10
Kerrang!	4/5
Metal Hammer	7/10 marks

Earthkeeper is the second studio album by the American rock band Pinkshift, released on August 29, 2025, through Hopeless Records. The album was recorded between November 2024 and January 2025 with producer Brett Romnes.

== Release and promotion ==
On April 18, 2025, "Evil Eye" was released as the lead single from Earthkeeper. On June 10, 2025, Pinkshift announced the album and released "Anita Ride". "Vacant" was released on July 8, 2025. "Dont Fight" and "Reflection" were released as a double single on August 5, 2025. Pinkshift is scheduled to embark on the Earthkeeper Tour between September and November 2025.

== Track listing ==
All tracks are written by Ashrita Kumar, Paul Vallejo, and Myron Houngbedji.

No.	Title	Length
1.	"Love It Here"	2:28
2.	"Anita Ride"	3:25
3.	"Evil Eye"	2:51
4.	"Don't Fight"	2:42
5.	"Patience"	4:06
6.	"Spiritseeker"	3:56
7.	"Blood"	4:02
8.	"Freefall"	2:06
9.	"Suspended"	4:08
10.	"Reflection"	4:14
11.	"Vacant"	2:57
12.	"Something More"	3:18
Total length:		40:18

== Personnel ==
Personnel per liner notes.

Pinkshift

- Ashrita Kumar - vocals
- Paul Vallejo - guitar, bass, vocals
- Myron Houngbedji - drums, vocals

Production

- Brett Romnes - production, mixing, recording
- Mike Kalajian - mastering
