= I Saw the TV Glow (soundtrack) =

I Saw the TV Glow (Original Soundtrack)

Soundtrack album by various artists
- Released: May 10, 2024
- Recorded: 2023–2024
- Length: 61:05
- Label: A24 Music

Singles from I Saw the TV Glow (Original Soundtrack)
- 1. "Anthems for a Seventeen Year-Old Girl" Released: March 13, 2024; 2. "Riding Around in the Dark" Released: April 24, 2024; 3. "Starburned and Unkissed" Released: May 3, 2024

I Saw the TV Glow (Original Soundtrack) is the soundtrack to the 2024 film of the same name directed by Jane Schoenbrun. It featured 15 tracks which included songs performed by Caroline Polachek, Sloppy Jane, Phoebe Bridgers, Kristina Esfandiari, Florist, and yeule amongst others. The album was released by A24 Music on May 10, 2024.

== Background ==
"It was a big gateway to a lot of the music that I would come to love in my teenage years. Music was such a deep and core part of my teenage experience. Making a teen angst film, it just felt like it needed to be filled with teen angst music."

— Schoenbrun on curating the film's soundtrack, in an interview to Bloody Disgusting

Schoenbrun wanted to curate an original soundtrack for the film, as music was a formative part of their teenage years. They recalled on seeing commercials on MTV for the film soundtracks, and inspired by that, they wanted to emulate films that would integrate music more fluidly rather than original songs appear in the opening or end credits. With the film taking place around the late 1990s and mid-2000s, when albums were the dominant way of consuming music, they felt that it was the right film to curate a timeless soundtrack. They pitched the idea to A24 on curating a soundtrack for the fictional television show The Pink Opaque and collaborate with contemporary bands and artists to write songs for the same. Schoenburn discovered most of the artists through the music website publication Pitchfork and some through their friends.

The soundtrack was a joint initiative of putting their favorite artists and iconic musical projects together under the "overarching rubric of making the last great '90s teen-angst movie soundtrack that never actually existed". Schoenbrun wanted the film and its soundtrack to be separate creative projects but share the same emotions which would make audiences who watch the film also listen to the soundtrack as well.

== Development ==
For the soundtrack, Schoenbrun intended to create the "greatest '90s mixtape that didn't exist yet". On the curation of the soundtrack, Schoenbrun said:

"A lot of them are queer artists, who make music in a lot of different genres, but like any good curatorial work—and I've done a lot of curatorial work—it can add up to something that's more than the sum of its parts".

Schoenbrun presented each artist with a 10-song mixtape of inspirations for the songs, as well as provided specific prompts to each musician. For the song "Photograph", Schoenbrun referred Drab Majesty to English rock band Echo & the Bunnymen, specifically their song "Bring on the Dancing Horses" from the soundtrack to the 1984 coming-of-age film Sixteen Candles. The song "Green" was recorded by L'Rain, who was given the prompt "electricity". Schoenbrun gave American singer Jay Som the prompt, "Write a song that would have been Teenage Fanclub's biggest hit" for the song "If I Could".

The second single from the soundtrack, "Riding Around in the Dark" was written by Emily Sprague, vocalist of the indie rock band Florist, to capture the feeling of "believing that the world is ending but somehow still living in it".

Caroline Polachek wrote and performed the original song "Starburned and Unkissed", the third single from the soundtrack, which was her first song for a feature film and her first "straight-up grunge track". It is featured in a sequence where Owen (Justice Smith) is walking through his high school. She described it as a song on "solitude in the digital age, but through a very surrealist but teenage kind of lyrical bent". The song was written in late-2021 when she moved to Los Angeles being in a long-distance relationship with her boyfriend, who was in Europe. She recorded it with A. G. Cook during a session for her album Desire, I Want to Turn Into You (2023). At the time, Cook was experimenting with electric guitar and pedalboards, which Polachek thought, "really suited the emotion [she] was seeped in", however, the song didn't fit onto Polachek's album, so she "forgot about it, forgot it existed". In 2022, when Schoenbrun approached Polachek about writing an original song for the film, she "suddenly realized that [she] had the perfect song sitting in [her] back pocket" and that "Starburned and Unkissed", "couldn't fit this film more".

Amidst curating original songs, Schoenbrun re-recorded two '90s tracks for the film, with one of them being Broken Social Scene's "Anthems For a Seventeen Year Old Girl" (2002) re-recorded by yeule, which featured in the first trailer. Initially, Schoenbrun originally planned for yeule to write an original song, but after they began talking about "Anthems For a Seventeen Year Old Girl", they decided yeule would be the "perfect person to cover 'Anthems'". Schoenbrun, who was obsessed with the song in high school, stated:

"It's about being a 17-year-old girl and feeling not cis normal, like you don't fit in with the people who have assimilated to a sense of normative culture. That's also represented in the original song in the way it is produced and sounds."

The other re-recorded song was the Smashing Pumpkins' "Tonight, Tonight" (1996) covered by Snail Mail—a musical project of Lindsey Jordan—who starred as Tara. However, this was edited out of the film, apart from a brief transition, and was not included in the soundtrack. The original music video for "Tonight, Tonight" was, however, the basis of the antagonist Mr. Melancholy, who appears in the fictional television show, The Pink Opaque. Of the Smashing Pumpkins' album Mellon Collie and the Infinite Sadness (1995), which features the song "Tonight, Tonight", Schoenbrun says:

"That's, like, the magic of a suburban youth encapsulated in that album. It's like the magic of night-time in the suburbs. The romance of that double record is rich, the visuals just so perfectly in line with this kind of haunted fairy tale—it was one of the first places I went when I was thinking how I wanted this movie to feel."

== Release ==
The soundtrack was announced on March 13, 2024 with the complete tracklist being unveiled and also made available for pre-order. yeule's cover of "Anthems For a Seventeen Year Old Girl" preceded as the first single from the album. It was then followed by "Riding Around in the Dark" as the second single, released on April 24, and "Starburned and Unkissed" as the third single on May 3. The soundtrack was released on May 10, 2024 on music streaming platforms and is set to be released through physical LP records in July 2024.

== Critical reception ==
Tessa Kaur of The Gamer wrote "There are so many ways to tell a story with one movie, but using your soundtrack to connect with your audience is a severely underrated one. It's almost meta in a way, making the queerness inextricable from the process of making the film, adding another layer of complexity on top of an already critically lauded film." Benjamin Lee of The Guardian wrote that the original soundtrack "feel perfectly of the time without being pastiche-y". and Robert Daniels of RogerEbert.com and William Bibbani of TheWrap described it as an "earworm" and "killer soundtrack", while Ross Bonaime of Collider called it as "tremendous". Adam Nayman of The Ringer wrote "the film pauses for musical numbers that serve as a sort of Greek chorus, delivered by singers who strategically collapse the distance between Nickelodeon and SoundCloud."

Colin Joyce of Pitchfork gave 7.1 out of 10 and wrote "Both I Saw the TV Glow and its soundtrack begin in ways that feel familiar and nostalgic before diving back into the shadows, rendering beloved youthful memories unrecognizably strange." Konstantinos Pappis of Our Culture gave four out of five to the album and wrote "The soundtrack plays to the artist's strengths, but rather than adhering to its cinematic vision, it also invites them to play with their own memories of being a teenager (or listening to music as a teenager), universalizing the film's anxieties without necessarily illuminating them."

== Track listing ==
I Saw the TV Glow (Original Soundtrack) track listing
No.	Title	Artist(s)	Length
1.	"Anthems for a Seventeen Year-Old Girl"	yeule	3:32
2.	"Another Season"	Frances Quinlan	3:44
3.	"Starburned and Unkissed"	Caroline Polachek	3:38
4.	"Riding Around in the Dark"	Florist	3:26
5.	"Big Glow"	Bartees Strange	2:51
6.	"Taper"	Maria BC	4:27
7.	"Psychic Wound"	King Woman	3:10
8.	"If I Could"	Jay Som	4:06
9.	"Green"	L'Rain	3:59
10.	"Moonlight"	The Weather Station	4:33
11.	"Photograph"	Drab Majesty	5:33
12.	"The 90s"	Proper.	2:59
13.	"How Can I Get Out?"	Sadurn	6:27
14.	"Bury"	King Woman	4:53
15.	"Claw Machine"	Sloppy Jane featuring Phoebe Bridgers	3:47
Total length:			61:05

Vinyl bonus track
No.	Title	Artist(s)	Length
16.	"Tonight, Tonight"	Snail Mail	4:19
Total length:			65:24

== Charts ==
Weekly chart performance for I Saw the TV Glow
Chart (2024)	Peak position
UK Soundtrack Albums (Official Charts)	12

== Release history ==
Release history for I Saw the TV Glow (Original Soundtrack)
Region	Date	Format(s)	Label	Ref.
Various	May 10, 2024	Digital download; streaming	A24	
Various	July 2024	Vinyl	A24	
