= Suraksha (EP) =

EP by Pinkshift
- Released: October 13, 2023
- Recorded: February 13–17, 2023
- Studio: Studio 4 Recording (Conshohocken)
- Length: 12:24
- Label: Hopeless
- Producer: Will Yip

Pinkshift chronology
| Love Me Forever (2022) | Suraksha (2023) | Earthkeeper (2025) |

Singles from Suraksha
- 1. "To Me" Released: April 13, 2023; 2. "Home" Released: August 4, 2023

Suraksha (Hindi: सुरक्षा. Sanskrit: "protection" or "security") is the second extended play (EP) by the American rock band Pinkshift, released on October 13, 2023, through Hopeless Records. Recorded in February 2023 with producer Will Yip at Studio 4 in Conshohocken, Pennsylvania, the EP's songs alternate between aggressive and serene moments whilst drawing upon vocalist Ashrita Kumar's South Asian heritage, and primarily deal with grief. Suraksha was promoted by two singles, "To Me" and "Home", and was performed in its entirety by Pinkshift during their headlining Eat Your Friends tour with Jhariah and Pollyanna. It received a positive review from Dork, who praised its progression and style.

== Background and composition ==
In 2022, Pinkshift released their debut album Love Me Forever. The band worked on the songs for Suraksha whilst touring in support of the album that year, and would write material through spontaneous jam sessions integrated into their live shows. The band filmed themselves as they were improvising and would critique and use the footage to produce demoes of songs. Thereafter, Pinkshift recorded the EP with producer Will Yip at Studio 4 in Conshohocken, Pennsylvania, between February 13–17, 2023. Guitarist Paul Vallejo used a baritone guitar and lower guitar tunings whilst recording the EP, serving as a precursor to the metal-influenced direction of Pinkshift's second album Earthkeeper (2025). Drummer Myron Houngbedji said that its songs were "contextualized" and came together thematically based on Pinkshift's circumstances at the time.

Suraksha's songs alternate between aggressive and serene moments whilst drawing upon Kumar's South Asian heritage, and primarily deal with grief. Its title is derived from the Sanskrit translation of the Hindi word for "protection" or "security". In a Discord posting, Kumar said that despite the EP's focus on their heratige, Pinkshift's later output would likely feature "other elements from Paul and Myron's lives". "Lullaby" opens with droning guitars and a recital of the Pavamana Mantra, from the Brihadaranyaka Upanishad. "Home" is an atmospheric track about "finding comfort with chosen family" that features distorted guitarwork and an outro marked by classical Indian instrumentation, according to Consequence's Eddie Fu. "To Me" is a love song incorporating 1990s alternative rock, shoegaze, and emo elements, and fuzzy and acoustic guitars. The EP's vinyl B-side includes instrumental versions of all three songs.

== Release and reception ==
Professional ratings
Review scores
| Source | Rating |
|---|---|
| Dork | 4/5 |

On April 13, 2023, Pinkshift released "To Me" as Suraksha's lead single. On August 4, they announced the EP and released "Home" as its second single. Suraksha was released on October 13, 2023. Pinkshift performed the EP in its entirety on the day of its release at the VFW Hall in Massapequa, New York, during their headlining Eat Your Friends Tour with Jhariah and Pollyanna. The band were joined onstage by veena player and KufliGirls member Abi Natesh. In a positive review for Dork, Alexander Bradley called the EP "a timely reminder of [Pinkshift's] brilliance", highlighting its progression and combined amplification and amalgamation of its members' cultural heritages into their music.

== Track listing ==
All tracks are written by Ashrita Kumar, Paul Vallejo, and Myron Houngbedji.

Suraksha track listing
| No. | Title | Length |
|---|---|---|
| 1. | "Lullaby" | 4:39 |
| 2. | "Home" | 3:41 |
| 3. | "To Me" | 4:03 |
| Total length: | | 12:24 |

Vinyl edition Side B
| No. | Title | Length |
|---|---|---|
| 1. | "Lullaby" (instrumental) | 4:39 |
| 2. | "Home" (instrumental) | 3:41 |
| 3. | "To Me" (instrumental) | 4:03 |
| Total length: | | 24:48 |

Notes

- All tracks are stylized in lower case.

== Personnel ==
Personnel per liner notes and Tidal.

Pinkshift
- Ashrita Kumar - lead vocals
- Paul Vallejo - guitar, bass
- Myron Houngbedji - drums
Additional personnel
- Anirudh Alva Changkakoti - tabla
- Sapan Modi - dhol
- Abi Natesh - veena

Production

- Will Yip - production, mixing, mastering
