= Live Forever (Bartees Strange album) =

Studio album by Bartees Strange
- Released: October 2, 2020
- Genres: Indie rock, hip hop, jazz
- Length: 35:24
- Label: Memory Music

Bartees Strange chronology
Say Goodbye to Pretty Boy (2020)	Live Forever (2020)	Farm to Table (2022)

Singles from Live Forever
- 1. "Mustang" Released: July 23, 2020; 2. "Boomer" Released: August 12, 2020; 3. "Kelly Rowland" Released: September 18, 2020

Professional ratings
Aggregate scores
Source	Rating
AnyDecentMusic?	7.7/10
Metacritic	83/100
Review scores
Source	Rating
Beats Per Minute	81%
Exclaim!	8/10
Flood Magazine	8/10
Paste	7.7/10
Pitchfork	8.2/10
Under the Radar	8/10

Live Forever is the debut studio album by English-born American musician Bartees Strange. It was released on October 2, 2020, by Memory Music.

== Production ==
The album was recorded in a barn studio in Wassaic, New York, and mastered by American producer Will Yip.

== Release ==
On July 23, 2020, Strange released the first single from the album "Mustang". The single has been described as "something of an indie rock anthem wrapped up in mesmerizing synths, catchy riffs and bombastic vocals." The music video was shot at Bartees Strange's apartment in Washington DC, with director Drew Horen. It was also featured as the Top 8 Best Song of the week by Paste on July 24, 2020. and Top 9 Songs of the Week by Under the Radar.

On August 12, 2020, Strange announced the release of his debut album, along with the second single "Boomer". The single has been described "a tight indie rock track driven by jangly guitars" while the music video shows Strange performing all the song's instruments from his home studio.

The third single "Kelly Rowland" was released on September 18, 2020. Along with the deluxe edition, Strange released the new version of the song titled "Free Kelly Rowland" with hip hop group Armand Hammer on October 1, 2021.

== Composition ==
The songs on Live Forever weave in sundry sounds and styles.

"Mustang" works in "infectious" guitar-pop, "sweltering" punk and "hooky" synth-rock. "Boomer" digs into "giddy" blues rock and hip hop verses. "Flagey God" channels experimental rock and witch house while working in "propulsive" dance-pop with a R&B chorus.

== Critical reception ==
Live Forever was met with "universal acclaim" reviews from critics. At Metacritic, which assigns a weighted average rating out of 100 to reviews from mainstream publications, this release received an average score of 83 based on 6 reviews. At AnyDecentMusic?, which collates album reviews from websites, magazines and newspapers, they gave the release a 7.7 out of 10, based on a critical consensus of 7 reviews.

Gareth O'Malley of Beats Per Minute wrote: "There’s so much ground covered on Live Forever that its easy to forget that it’s 35 minutes long. Strange’s genreless approach to making music means that its eventual follow-up could explore any of the sonic avenues the album heads down – or something else entirely" Writing for Exclaim!, Adam Feibel explained: "As intriguing as Strange's music already is, Live Forever demonstrates that there's still tremendous potential left to unlock." He went on to say that the release "is itself not quite a masterpiece, but it's a clear picture of someone who's destined for greatness. Bartees Strange is a visionary artist worth watching closely."

=== Accolades ===
Accolades for Live Forever
Publication	Accolade	Rank
Consequence of Sound	Top 50 Albums of 2020	42
Crack Magazine	Top 50 Albums of 2020	46
NPR Music	Top 50 Albums of 2020	32
Paste	Top 50 Albums of 2020	36
Pitchfork	The 50 Best Albums of 2020	30
Pitchfork	The 35 Best Rock Albums of 2020	Unranked
PopMatters	Top 10 Indie Rock Albums of 2020	6
Rolling Stone	Top 50 Albums of 2020	50
Stereogum	Top 50 Albums of 2020	16
Under the Radar	Top 100 Albums of 2020	15
Uproxx	Top 50 Albums of 2020	25
Vectis Radio	Top 10 Albums of 2020	2

== Track listing ==
Live Forever track listing
No.	Title	Length
1.	"Jealousy"	2:41
2.	"Mustang"	3:54
3.	"Boomer"	3:18
4.	"Kelly Rowland"	1:57
5.	"In a Cab"	2:17
6.	"Stone Meadows"	3:51
7.	"Flagey God"	3:42
8.	"Mossblerd"	1:28
9.	"Far"	4:10
10.	"Fallen for You"	4:09
11.	"Ghostly"	3:57

Live Forever – deluxe edition bonus tracks
No.	Title	Length
4.	"Free Kelly Rowland" (featuring Armand Hammer)	3:20
12.	"Weights"	2:36
13.	"Flagey God Redux"	2:39
