= Farm to Table (album) =

2022 studio album by Bartees Strange

Studio album by Bartees Strange
- Released: June 17, 2022
- Recorded: 2020–2021
- Studios: 38 North Studios; 4AD Studios; Strange Land Studios; Tonal Park
- Genres: Hip hop, indie rock, political music
- Length: 34:14
- Language: English
- Label: 4AD
- Producers: Dave Cerminara; Chris Connors; Steph Marziano; Bartees Strange

Bartees Strange chronology
| Live Forever (2020) | Farm to Table (2022) | Horror (2025) |

Farm to Table is the second studio album by American indie rock musician Bartees Strange, released on 4AD on June 17, 2022. The album has been met with positive reviews for its stylistic variety and emotionally deep lyrics.

== Recording and release ==
The album title refers to Strange's upbringing in rural Oklahoman farms to now having a seat at the table with music industry success. This is his first album released by 4AD and was recorded during the COVID-19 pandemic, when Strange was not able to perform live. He felt musically inspired after finishing his debut full-length Live Forever and began recording this follow-up the day before that album was released. Lyrical themes on the album explore the struggle he felt having success during times of difficulty and desperation for others, as well as the political turmoil during the George Floyd protests. Strange also explores his relationship with his parents in the lyrics; he debuted the work to them in early 2022 as soon as it was finished.

== Promotion ==
Strange released "Heavy Heart" as the album's lead single and his first single on 4AD on March 1, 2022. April 21, 2022 saw the release of the album's second single, "Cosigns", alongside the announcement of a June 17 release date. "Hold the Line" followed as the third single on May 13, 2022. "Wretched" was issued as the fourth and final pre-release single on June 13, 2022.

Strange promoted the album with his first headlining tour.

== Critical reception ==
Professional ratings
Aggregate scores
| Source | Rating |
|---|---|
| AnyDecentMusic? | 7.6/10 |
| Metacritic | 83/100 |
Review scores
| Source | Rating |
| AllMusic | 4/5 stars |
| Beats Per Minute | 69% |
| Clash | 7/10 |
| Exclaim! | 8/10 |
| The Line of Best Fit | 8/10 |
| Paste | 8.4/10 |
| Pitchfork | 8.0/10 |
| PopMatters | 8/10 |
| Rolling Stone | 4.5/5 stars |
| Slant Magazine | 3/5 stars |

According to the review aggregator Metacritic, Farm to Table received "universal acclaim" based on a weighted average score of 83 out of 100 from 14 critic scores. AnyDecentMusic?'s board summed up 15 reviews with a 7.6 out of 10. The editorial board of AllMusic Guide gave Farm to Table four out of five stars, with reviewer Timothy Monger praising the stylistic variety on the recording. Jayson Greene of Pitchfork rated the album an 8.0 out of 10, noting "nimble genre-hopping and his dynamic songwriting" and specifically noting Strange's ability to discuss political themes in his lyrics. In The New York Times, Jon Pareles also calls out the political lyrics in "Hold the Line", a tune written in response to the murder of George Floyd, which the critic calls "the album's most richly moving song". Maura Johnston gave Farm to Table 4.5 out of five stars in Rolling Stone, proposing that his "emotionally rich [lyrics]... [include] stories behind old scars [that] sit side-by-side with in-the-moment descriptions of raw new feelings", but that never "get bogged down in overly self-conscious musings about the slings and arrows of his budding fame". Grant Sharples of Paste christens Strange a "polymath" whose variety of genres and diverse styles of lyrics foretell a long and fruitful career.

Multiple reviews scored the album an eight out of 10: Writing for The Line of Best Fit, Caleb Campbell mused that Strange "might well be indie rock's biggest breakout success of the past several years" and summed up the album as a "no-holds-barred celebration". Jean-Michel Lacombe of Exclaim! discussed Strange's ability to bring intimacy to his music by "channeling... firsthand minutia into maximalist musical moments" and characterized the musical genres as a "buffet" of "rock, emo, folk, rap and electronica" that makes a "multi-course meal". PopMatters' Jeremy Levine wrote that "impressive genre-bending feats do not necessarily make a record someone emotionally treasures or that they come back to in vulnerable moments. Farm to Table offers as much substance as it offers style." In Under the Radar, Mark Moody opined that Strange is "refusing to sit still long enough to be pigeonholed".

A more mixed score came from Tim Sentz of Beats Per Minute, with a 69% that is accompanied by a review critical of the lack of focus on the album, but noting that "a lot of heart" went into the recording. Charles Lyon-Burt of Slant Magazine gave this three out of five stars, pointing out several high points from the music, but calling it "somewhat anonymous". Alex Rigotti of Clash considered Farm to Table a seven out of 10, with several strong tracks, alongside a few that are mixed quality, but pointing out that "it takes a wealth of creativity and guts to make an album as individual as this".

Accolades for Farm to Table
| Publication | List | Rank |
|---|---|---|
| The New York Times | Best Albums of 2022, Jon Caramanica | 7 |
| NME | 50 Best Albums of 2022 | 36 |
| Our Culture Mag | The 50 Best Albums of 2022 | 46 |
| Rolling Stone | Best Albums of 2022 | 16 |
| Spin | 50 More Great Albums of the Year | unranked |

In addition to the above listings, Farm to Table was on the personal best albums of 2022 lists for NPR music critic Gabby Bulgarelli, Cassandra Jenkins, and Sparta's Jim Ward.

== Track listing ==
1. "Heavy Heart" (Chris Connors, John E. Daise, Dan Kleederman, Graham Richman, Bartees Strange, and Carter Zumtobel) – 4:23
2. "Mulholland Dr." (Kleederman and Strange) – 4:01
3. "Wretched" (Strange) – 3:49
4. "Cosigns" (Connors and Strange) – 2:35
5. "Tours" (Steph Marziano and Strange) – 2:43
6. "Hold the Line" (Strange) – 4:23
7. "We Were Only Close for Like Two Weeks" (Connors and Strange) – 0:58
8. "Escape This Circus" (Connors and Strange) – 3:26
9. "Black Gold" (Strange) – 3:38
10. "Hennessy" (Strange) – 4:18

Vinyl editions feature "Daily News" (written by Stay Inside and Strange) after "Escape This Circus".

== Personnel ==
- Bartees Strange – lead vocals, backing vocals, electric guitar, piano, synth bass, synthesizer, percussion, tambourine, keyboards, acoustic guitar, slide guitar, effects, and programming, production, recording, engineering
- Jordyn Blakely – drums and percussion on "Heavy Heart" and "Mulholland Dr."
- John Brooks – recording and engineering on "Heavy Heart" and "Mulholland Dr."
- Dave Cerminara – synthesizer, drum programming, engineering, recording, and production on "Wretched"
- Chris Connors – electric guitar, bass guitar, synth brass, 12-string guitar, piano, synthesizer, recording, engineering, mixing (at Concrete Sound), and production on "Heavy Heart", "Mulholland Dr.", "Wretched", "Hold the Line", "Escape This Circus", "We Were Only Close For Like Two Weeks," "Black Gold," and "Hennessy"
- John E. Daise – bass guitar on "Mulholland Dr." and "We Were Only Close for Like Two Weeks"
- Alison Fielding – design
- Don Godwin – tuba, sousaphone, and piano on "Heavy Heart"
- Victor Indrizzo – drums on "We Were Only Close for Like Two Weeks""
- Joe Kennedy – bass guitar on "We Were Only Close for Like Two Weeks"
- Dan Kleederman – bass guitar, electric guitar, and slide guitar on "Heavy Heart", "Mulholland Dr.", and "Hold the Line"
- Steph Marziano – production on "Tours"
- Conor Murphy – horns and trumpet on "Heavy Heart"
- Fabian Prynn – drums on "Cosigns", "Escape This Circus", and "Hennesy"; recording and engineering on "Cosigns", "Tours", "We Were Only Close for Like Two Weeks", and "Escape This Circus"
- Sarah Register – mastering
- Graham Richman – electric guitar, 12-string guitar, synthesizer, keyboards, and electric piano on "Heavy Heart", "Mulholland Dr.", "Wretched", "Tours", "Hold the Line", "We Were Only Close for Like Two Weeks", "Escape This Circus", and "Black Gold"
- Dillon Treacy – drums on "Hold the Line"
- Niek Truijen – artwork
- Eliza Vera – backing vocals on "Heavy Heart" and "Mulholland Dr."
- Austin Vos – slide guitar on "Black Gold"

== Release history ==
Farm to Table release history
| Region | Date | Label | Format |
|---|---|---|---|
| Worldwide | June 17, 2022 | 4AD | Digital distribution and streaming |
| Worldwide | October 7, 2022 | 4AD | Compact disc and vinyl LP |

== See also ==
- List of 2022 albums (January–June)
