= Stay Inside =

American post-hardcore band

- Origin: Brooklyn, New York, U.S.
- Genres: Post-punk; post-hardcore; emo; soft grunge
- Years active: 2016–present
- Label: No Sleep
- Members: Vishnu Anantha; Chris Johns; Chris Lawless; Bryn Nieboer
- Past members: Bartees Strange
- Website: stayinside.bandcamp.com

Stay Inside is an American post-hardcore band based in Brooklyn, New York. The band consists of Bryn Nieboer, Chris Johns, Chris Lawless, and Vishnu Anantha.

== History ==
The band formed in Brooklyn in 2016 and initially consisted of Bartees Strange, Chris Johns, Vishnu Anantha, and Bryn Nieboer. All the band's members were transplants; Strange was from Yukon, Oklahoma, Johns from Hockessin, Delaware, Anatha from Wayne, Pennsylvania, and Nieboer from Los Angeles. Their debut EP, As You Were was released in April 2017, followed by The Sea Engulfs Us and the Light Goes Out in 2018. That same year, the band released the collaborative EP Balancing Acts with Good Looking Friends, and The Final Girl, a with Dad Thighs and Great Weights.

In 2018, following Bartees Strange's departure to pursue a solo career, Chris Lawless joined the band on guitar and vocals. On April 10, 2020, the band's debut studio album, Viewing was released by No Sleep Records, during the COVID-19 pandemic. The album was met with positive critical reception.

Two years later, the band released their EP, Blight on June 3, 2022. On February 28, 2024, the band released their sophomore album, Ferried Away, which was also met with positive critical reception.

== Members ==
Current

- Bryn Nieboer - bass, vocals (2016–present)
- Chris Johns - guitar, vocals (2016–present)
- Vishnu Anantha - drums (2016–present)
- Chris Lawless - guitar, vocals (2018–present)

Former

- Bartees Strange - guitar, vocals (2016–2018)

== Discography ==
=== Albums ===
- Viewing (2020) - No Sleep Records
- Ferried Away (2024)
- Lunger (2025)

=== EPs and Splits ===
- As You Were (2017)
- The Sea Engulfs Us and the Light Goes Out (2018)
- Balancing Act (split w/ Good Looking Friends) (2018)
- The Final Girl (split w/ Dad Thighs and Great Weights) (2019)
- Blight (2022)

=== Singles ===
- "Offseason" (2019)
