= Trust Ceremony =

Studio album by Jhariah
- Released: April 19, 2024
- Genres: Alternative rock; emo-pop; electronic
- Length: 46:02
- Label: Independent (distributed by ONErpm)
- Producer: Jhariah Clare

Jhariah chronology
A Beginner's Guide To Faking Your Own Death (2021)	Trust Ceremony (2024)

Singles from Trust Ceremony
- 1. "Risk, Risk, Risk!" Released: August 31, 2023; 2. "Eat Your Friends" Released: October 26, 2023; 3. "Pin-Eye" Released: January 26, 2024

Trust Ceremony (stylised in all caps) is the second studio album by Jhariah. Released April 19, 2024, it follows their 2021 extended play A Beginner's Guide to Faking Your Own Death, and was written and produced by Jhariah. The album follows themes of aspirations, mental health, and personal relationships and betrayals. Track and single Eat Your Friends features rock band Pinkshift as well as writing from the band's singer Ashrita Kumar.

== Track listing ==
Trust Ceremony track listing
No.	Title	Length
1.	"Tooth Pact"	2:44
2.	"Big Shot"	2:42
3.	"Fire4Fun"	3:37
4.	"Risk, Risk, Risk!"	3:21
5.	"Collarbone"	0:50
6.	"Pin-Eye"	4:32
7.	"Maybe Later Dance"	3:08
8.	"Control Baby"	3:19
9.	"Eat Your Friends (with Pinkshift)"	3:14
10.	"RE: Concerns"	4:26
11.	"Sasuke"	4:13
12.	"Russian Doll"	4:56
13.	"Trust Ceremony"	5:22
Total length:		46:02

Notes:

- All tracks are stylised in upper-case.
