= Sleeper's Bell =

American folk band

Sleeper's Bell is an American indie folk band from Chicago, Illinois fronted by vocalist Blaine Teppema and guitarist Evan Green.

== History ==
In 2021, Teppema self-released her debut EP, titled Umarell. Shortly after, guitarist Evan Green joined the project. In 2024, the duo announced their debut album Clover. Alongside the album's announcement, the duo released the single "Over". In addition, the duo also released the singles "Bored", "Bad Word", and the single "Room". The album was released on February 7, 2025 with "Bad Word" being named one of the "5 Best Songs of the Week" by Stereogum. and highlighted by The New York Times.

== Discography ==
Studio albums

- Clover (2025, Angel Tapes/Fire Talk)

EPs

- Umarell (2021, self-released)
