= The Great American Novel (album) =

Studio album by Proper.
- Released: March 25, 2022
- Recorded: February 2021
- Genre: Emo; pop-punk; post-hardcore
- Length: 50:40
- Label: Father/Daughter; Big Scary Monsters
- Producer: Bartees Strange

Proper. chronology
I Spent the Winter Writing Songs About Getting Better (2019)	The Great American Novel (2022)	Part-Timer (2023)

Singles from The Great American Novel
- 1. "Red, White & Blue" Released: November 11, 2021; 2. "Milk & Honey" Released: January 18, 2022; 3. "Huerta" Released: February 2, 2022; 4. "Jean" Released: March 23, 2022

Professional ratings
Review scores
Source	Rating
Clash	8/10
God Is in the TV	9/10
Ox-Fanzine	4.5/5 stars
Sputnikmusic	4.0/5
Under the Radar	8.5/10

The Great American Novel is the third studio album by American rock band Proper., released on March 25, 2022, through Father/Daughter Records and Big Scary Monsters. The album was produced and recorded in February 2021 by Bartees Strange.

== Track listing ==
No.	Title	Length
1.	"You Good?" (In Media Res)	1:44
2.	"Shuck & Jive"	3:34
3.	"Red, White & Blue"	2:42
4.	"Jean"	4:31
5.	"McConnell"	3:42
6.	"Ganymede"	3:28
7.	"Barbershop Interlude"	0:48
8.	"In the Van Somewhere Outside of Birmingham"	3:20
9.	"Juvie"	4:15
10.	"The Routine"	2:42
11.	"Huerta"	3:27
12.	"Milk & Honey"	3:27
13.	"Done Talking"	4:26
14.	"Americana"	4:59
15.	"Yeah... I'm Good" (Epilogue)	3:28
Total length:		50:40

== Personnel ==
Proper.

- Erik Garlington - guitar, vocals
- Natasha Johnson - bass, backing vocals
- Elijah Watson - drums

Production

- Bartees Strange - production
- Dan Campbell - co-production
- Brian DiMeglio - mixing, mastering
