= Love Me Forever (Pinkshift album) =

Studio album by Pinkshift
- Released: October 21, 2022
- Recorded: March 2022
- Studio: Studio 4 Recording (Conshohocken)
- Genres: Alternative rock; emo; grunge; hard rock; indie rock; pop-punk; post-hardcore
- Length: 37:53
- Label: Hopeless
- Producer: Will Yip

Pinkshift chronology
Saccharine (2021)	Love Me Forever (2022)	Suraksha (2023)

Singles from Love Me Forever
- 1. "Nothing (In My Head)" Released: June 1, 2022; 2. "I'm Not Crying You're Crying" Released: July 13, 2022; 3. "Get Out" Released: August 24, 2022; 4. "In a Breath" Released: September 21, 2022

Love Me Forever is the debut studio album by the American rock band Pinkshift, released on October 21, 2022. After breaking out in the pop-punk scene following the viral success of their single "I'm Gonna Tell My Therapist on You", Pinkshift began writing their debut album in late 2020 and signed to Hopeless Records in 2021. Recorded in March 2022 with producer Will Yip at Studio 4 in Conshohocken, Pennsylvania, Love Me Forever sees Pinkshift expand their musical range beyond the pop-punk style of their early releases into alternative rock, emo, grunge, hard rock, indie rock, and post-hardcore. Its lyrics explore topics including abusive relationships, trauma, alienation, social media, and coming of age in the wake of the COVID-19 pandemic.

Music critics praised Pinkshift's catchy songwriting and energetic performances on Love Me Forever. Alternative Press and Kerrang! listed the album as one of the best of 2022, whilst BrooklynVegan and Paste ranked it as one of the year's best punk albums. The album was supported by four singles, "Nothing (In My Head)", "I'm Not Crying You're Crying", "Get Out", and "In a Breath". Pinkshift embarked on a headlining tour of North America in support of the album, The Forever Tour, between October and November 2022. An extended play (EP) of remixes, Love Me for the Summer, was released in July 2024.

== Background and recording ==
Vocalist Ashrita Kumar met guitarist Paul Vallejo and began writing songs under the alias Sugar Crisis in 2018. The following year, they found drummer Myron Houngbedji and formed Pinkshift. All three members were attending the Johns Hopkins University in Baltimore, Maryland. After recruiting bassist Erich Weinroth, Pinkshift began playing live shows in late 2019. In August 2020, the band's single "I'm Gonna Tell My Therapist on You" achieved viral success and helped them "[become] one of the biggest breakout names on the pop-punk scene", according to Spencer Hughes of NME. The song also brought the band to the attention of Eric Tobin, the head of A&R at Hopeless Records. In 2021, Pinkshift self-released their debut extended play Saccharine and went on tour supporting Mannequin Pussy, during which time they met with Tobin and other members of Hopeless and decided to sign with the label. Weinroth departed the band soon after the EP's release.

Pinkshift began writing Love Me Forever in late 2020, and recorded three demos with producer Will Yip in March 2021; the band performed several songs from the album during their shows that year. With the exception of "In a Breath", the album's songs were written by Kumar, Vallejo, and Houngbedji, who worked collaboratively and wrote parts for each other outside of lyrics and drums, which were handled by Kumar and Houngbedji respectively. Whilst working on the album, Houngbedji drew influence from hardcore music, Kublai Khan, Turnstile, Knocked Loose, and Roland TR-808 drum patterns in hip-hop music. Vallejo cited Microwave, Pierce the Veil, and Citizen as influences on his guitar playing during this time. Kumar began playing guitar shortly after the release of Saccharine, resulting in an increased grunge influence in Pinkshift's songwriting from bands such as Nirvana and Soundgarden. They (Note: Kumar is non-binary and uses they/them pronouns.) were also heavily inspired by the Arctic Monkeys, specifically their albums Whatever People Say I Am, That's What I'm Not (2006) and Favourite Worst Nightmare (2007). Pinkshift's experiences of coming of age in the wake of the COVID-19 pandemic and what they saw as "injustices and failings" by the United States government during this time served as additional influences on the lyrics.

Pinkshift recorded Love Me Forever with Yip over the course of three weeks in March 2022, at Studio 4 in Conshohocken, Pennsylvania. Its recording marked the first time the band worked in a proper recording studio. Houngbedji recorded his drum tracks within a week, after which the bass and guitars were tracked. Kumar likened recording to a summer camp, and Yip to a coach. Pinkshift had completed 90% of the album's material before going into the studio, and were encouraged by Yip to push themselves performance and songwriting-wise. Kumar said that Yip shared similar influences with Pinkshift and helped "exemplify the core" of their songs. Houngbedji said he connected well with Yip as they were both drummers, and credited him with making his playing style more precise and specific. Recording was completed days before Pinkshift embarked on a two-month-long tour supporting PUP, which began on April 1, 2022.

== Composition ==
Love Me Forever has been described as alternative rock, emo, grunge, hard rock, indie rock, pop-punk, and post-hardcore. Pinkshift intended to display their musical range beyond the pop-punk style of their early releases and potentially expand the genre's limitations, though they did not reject their association with it. The album's songs are generally fast-paced and marked by "jagged" guitars, melodic elements, guitar solos, hard-hitting drums, and "expressive" vocals. The album's lyrics explore topics including abusive relationships, trauma, alienation, social media, and coming of age in the wake of the COVID-19 pandemic. They predominately express feelings of anger, angst, and anguish, and balance "vulnerability and defiance", according to Vicky Greer of New Noise Magazine. Kumar said that the lyrics primarily dealt with the experience of being alive, and further stated in an interview with Goucher College's Revelance blog: "Even though you do have rage at these big systems of oppression, it becomes a personal rage because you're personally targeted if you're anything other than a cis white guy". They also said the album's title was meant to highlight the fact that "no one is going to love you more than you love yourself".

Love Me Forever opens with "I'm Not Crying You're Crying", a heavy, energetic song about struggling and being distrustful of those offering help. Kumar said it was the only song on the album to come exclusively from a place of "raw and unfiltered emotion". "Nothing (In My Head)" is about wanting to escape from a place of feeling trapped, and social media addiction. David Renshaw of The Fader called it a "heavy AF ode to turning off your devices and embracing the smooth brain lifestyle." The song's guitars and vocals were heavily inspired by the Nirvana song "Breed", to the extent that Kumar had to rewrite the song's original melody and lyrics due to them being too similar. Kumar described "Get Out" as a call to reclaim one's means of autonomy and self-expression from white supremacist and patriarchal hierarchies. Nick Ruskell of Kerrang! described "Cherry (We're All Gonna Die)" as reminiscient of Turnstile "with bigger choruses". Titled after the song of the same name by The Offspring, "The Kids Aren't Alright" is a "war cry" marked by aggressive musicianship and vocals. Kumar said the song marks the point at which the lyrics on Love Me Forever move from vague feelings into specificity and identify what is wrong. "Trust Fall" details an abusive relationship, and is about "realizing [...] the anger that you feel after going through something that wasn't fair."

"In a Breath" is an introspective piano ballad centered around Kumar's experiences dealing with trauma, bodily dissasociation, and post-traumatic stress disorder (PTSD) in the aftermath of an abusive relationship. Kumar wrote the song in 2018 and continued to revisit it for comfort until deciding to present it to the other members of Pinkshift. Houngbedji said the band included the song on Love Me Forever as they felt it fit the album's thematic context, despite sounding unlike the rest of its songs. "Cinderella" is a slow-paced song that sees Kumar wishing they could erase memories of someone who betrayed them. Greer compared its dynamics to Evanescence and New Years Day. "Burn the Witch" is a narrative-driven song inspired by Kumar's experience of having their friends turn against them, after a member of their dance team began spreading false rumours about them whilst they were ill. Abby Jones of Consequence viewed its lyrics as analyzing groupthink's "disproportionate maliciousness" towards women. The album's title track is rooted in pop-punk, whilst "Let Me Drown" displays hardcore influences. The latter song's demo was heavily inspired by the Heart Attack Man song "Puke". Aliya Chaudry of Stereogum viewed the album's final track, "Dreamer", as "signifying the journey of coming to terms with challenges and making it through to the other side." Pinkshift wrote the song through jamming and sought to make "something that people could dance to", according to Kumar. Its lyrics were influenced by the Arctic Monkeys song "A Certain Romance".

== Release and promotion ==
On June 1, 2022, Pinkshift announced their signing to Hopeless Records and released the lead single from Love Me Forever, "Nothing (In My Head)". On July 13, the band announced the album and released "I'm Not Crying You're Crying". Following the release of two further singles, "Get Out" and "In a Breath", Love Me Forever was released on October 21, 2022. On July 11, 2024, Pinkshift released Love Me for the Summer, an EP featuring remixes by Caco of five of the album's songs in a variety of styles including trap, house, and dariacore.

Preceding the release of Love Me Forever, Pinkshift played four shows opening for Destroy Boys on the east coast of the United States and performed at the Emo Nite New Orleans Vacation alongside Bring Me the Horizon and 100 gecs in September 2022. From October 20 and November 19, 2022, the band embarked on their debut headlining of the United States, the Forever Tour, which saw Kumar performing guitar onstage for the first time. The band were supported by Jigsaw Youth and Yasmin Nur, who dropped off the tour early on.

== Critical reception ==
Professional ratings
Review scores
Source	Rating
Kerrang!	4/5
New Noise Magazine	4/5 stars
Stereoboard	4/5 stars
Under the Radar	7.5/10
Upset	4/5 stars

Greer of New Noise Magazine called Love Me Forever "a beautifully complex record that shows off the seemingly limitless talent" of Pinkshift's members. Ruskell of Kerrang! said the album's "sharp, skilful [sic] and bristling with infectious energy" and considered it a promising debut album. Emma Wilkes of Stereoboard similarly wrote how the album was one of the best rock debuts of 2022, placing particular praise on Kumar's vocals and the record's "genuine trendless individuality". Spencer Hughes of NME remarked that Pinkshift's "sonics are [shown to be] wider-ranging and more exciting than ever" on the album; Alessandro DeCaro of Alternative Press felt its stylistic range and the band's "unique arrangement skills" broadened its appeal. Under the Radar reviewer Caleb Campbell highlighted the performances of its members and the album's balance between "searing energy and visceral vulnerability". Jones of Consequence praised the album's production and themes, calling it a "useful companion for the world's downfall". BrooklynVegan's Andrew Sacher remarked that Pinkshift had "a knack for writing pop music that you can rock the fuck out to", and, courtesy of Yip's production, "sound[ed] both heavier and catchier" on the album compared to Saccharine. Jenny Josefine Schulz of Ox-Fanzine thought the album's vocals lacked depth but made up for this with "truly atmospheric, catchy instrumentals".

Love Me Forever was listed as one of the best albums of 2022 by Alternative Press and Kerrang!, whilst BrooklynVegan and Paste ranked it as one of the years' best punk albums and Loudwire listed it as one of the year's best rock and metal debut albums. The members of Magnolia Park also listed as one of their favourite albums of the year. "Nothing (In My Head)" was also included in Vulture's list of the best songs of 2022.

== Track listing ==
All tracks are written by Ashrita Kumar, Paul Vallejo, and Myron Houngbedji.

No.	Title	Length
1.	"I'm Not Crying You're Crying"	2:49
2.	"Nothing (In My Head)"	3:05
3.	"Get Out"	2:18
4.	"Cherry (We're All Gonna Die)"	2:32
5.	"The Kids Aren't Alright"	3:16
6.	"Trust Fall"	3:09
7.	"In a Breath"	3:58
8.	"Cinderella"	2:59
9.	"Burn the Witch"	3:22
10.	"Love Me Forever"	3:57
11.	"Let Me Drown"	2:05
12.	"Dreamer"	4:17
Total length:		37:53

Notes

- Tracks 1, 2, 4, 5, 7, 11 stylized in lower case
- Tracks 3 and 9 stylized in all caps

== Personnel ==
Personnel per liner notes.

Pinkshift
- Ashrita Kumar - vocals, piano
- Paul Vallejo - guitar, bass, vocals
- Myron Houngbedji - drums, vocals
Production
- Will Yip - production, mixing, mastering

Artwork

- Leigh Ann Rodgers - album art
- Madison Schubert - LP design
