= Glass Beach (band) =

American indie rock band

- Origin: Los Angeles, U.S.
- Genres: Indie rock; math rock; art rock; post-emo; progressive rock
- Years active: 2016–2026
- Label: Run for Cover
- Past members: Autumn McClendon; Jonas Newhouse; William White; Layne Smith
- Website: glassbeach.band/main

Glass Beach (stylized in lowercase) was an American indie rock band from Los Angeles and based in Seattle. Their music has been described as "heavy indie rock", blending influences including punk rock, math rock, and mid-century jazz. They cite some of their musical influences as Jeff Rosenstock, They Might Be Giants, and the Brave Little Abacus.

The band's formation and music was closely tied to internet communities, and according to The Washington Post has "developed a cultish online following". In early 2020, the Los Angeles Times predicted that the band "likely won't be playing cozy venues like All Star Lanes for much longer."

== History ==
=== 2015–2018: Early years ===
In 2015, lead singer Autumn J. McClendon, also known as "J" or "Classic J", made the move to Los Angeles, California, from her hometown of Burleson, Texas, where she began demoing tracks and worked on her solo project, Casio Dad. During this time she released an EP titled He's Not With Us Anymore. Shortly after, while attending the University of Minnesota Morris, close friends Jonas Newhouse and William White heard a song from Autumn's new EP on their school's radio station, and immediately found interest in the musician. The trio quickly became friends, and soon Newhouse and White joined Autumn in Los Angeles to live together and form Glass Beach. For the next three years, the group worked diligently on their first album, The First Glass Beach Album, which would debut on May 18, 2019, under Run for Cover Records.

=== 2019–2022: The First Glass Beach Album ===
Before the album's release, musician and artist Layne Smith joined the group as the band's guitarist after bonding over Dungeons & Dragons, and immediately got to work developing the band's live sound and became a key member of the group.

The band released several singles and a remix album following The First Glass Beach Album, many of them initially released on Bandcamp. These included "running", originally written for Bill & Ted Face the Music before it was cut from the film, and released in 2020. The band released an alternate version of "classic j dies and goes to hell", a song on their first album, in celebration of the song achieving 1 million streams on Spotify. They covered Car Seat Headrest's "Beach Life-In-Death" in January 2021, as well as "Welcome to the Black Parade" by My Chemical Romance in July of the same year for Pride Month. The remix album, featuring Bartees Strange, Skylar Spence, Ska Tune Network, and Dogleg, was also released in 2021.

Between November and December of 2021, the band would go on their first US tour. During this tour, William White would contract a major case of COVID-19, causing parts of the tour to be cancelled, as well as their eventual departure from playing live with the band.

=== 2023–2026: Plastic Death and later years ===
In 2023, Glass Beach released an alternate reality game hosted on their website which culminated in the reveal of the name and tracklist of their second album Plastic Death. On October 11, 2023 the band released the album's first single, "the CIA", featuring themes of fear and surveillance by the Central Intelligence Agency, with a music video directed by White. On November 6, the band released the second single, "rare animal", a song about the disappearance of D. B. Cooper. Plastic Death was released on January 19, 2024, followed by the band's second US tour.

On February 23, 2026, Autumn released a solo album entitled it's fine to dream under her new project's name, 'you are an angel'.

On April 30, 2026, Glass Beach announced their dissolution, stating "we are no longer capable of making music together that we're proud of nor can we tour in a way that works for all of us."

== Members ==
- Autumn McClendon – vocals/guitar (2016–2026)
- Jonas Newhouse – bass (2016–2026)
- William White – drums (2016–2026)
- Layne Smith – lead guitar (2019–2026)

== Discography ==
=== Studio albums ===
- The First Glass Beach Album (2019)
- Plastic Death (2024)

=== Remix albums ===
- Alchemist Rats Beg Bashful (Remixes) (2021)

=== Singles ===
- "Neon Glow" (2018)
- "Running" (2020)
- "Classic J Dies and Gets a Million Streams on Spotify" (2020)
- "1015" (2020)
- "Beach Life in Death" (2021)
- "Welcome to the Black Parade" (2021)
- "The CIA" (2023)
- "Rare Animal" (2023)
