= Bartees Strange =

American musician and producer (born 1989)

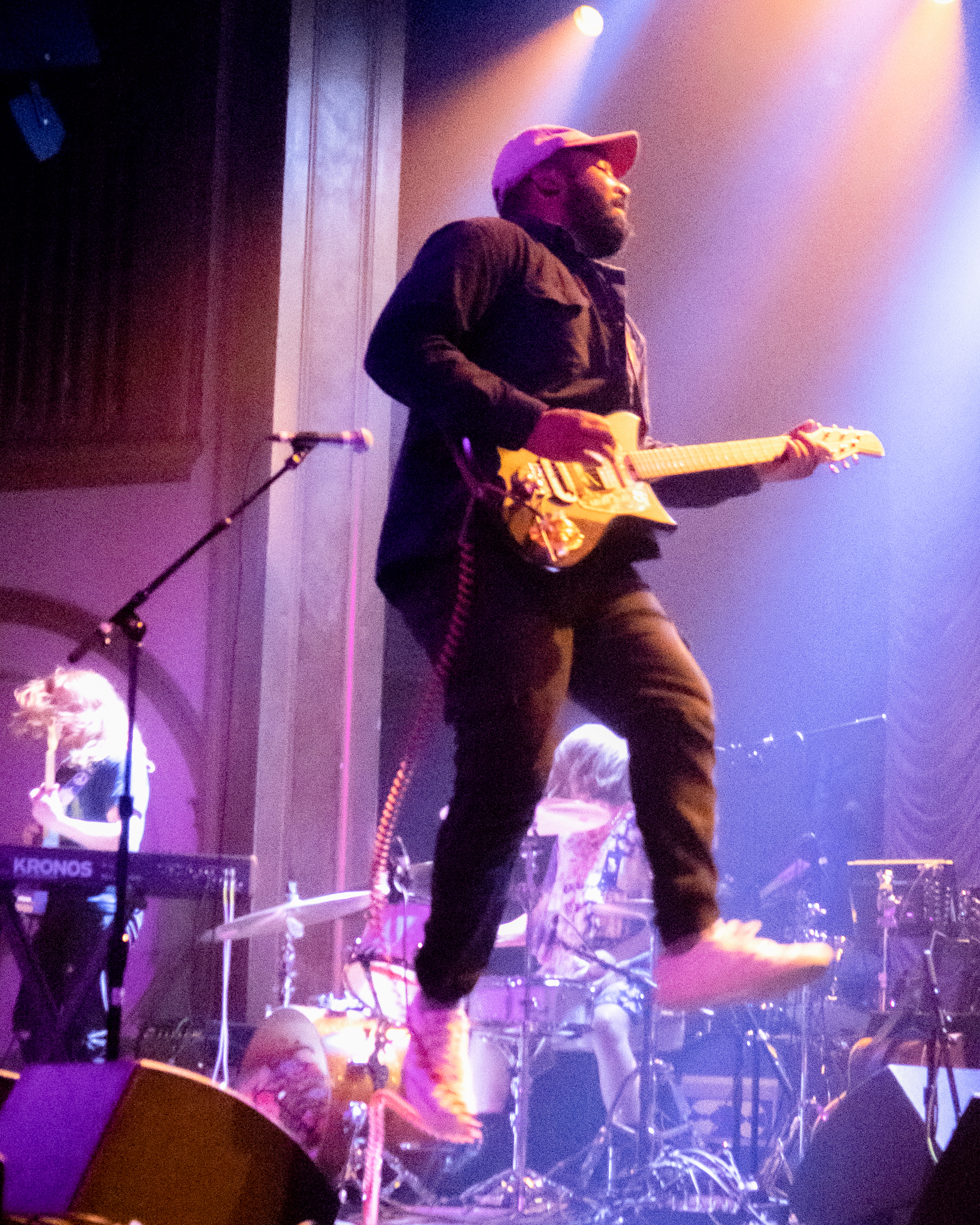
- Strange performing in 2021

Background information
- Born: Bartees Leon Cox Jr. 1989 (age 36–37); Ipswich, England
- Origin: Mustang, Oklahoma, United States
- Genre: Indie rock
- Occupation: Musician
- Instruments: Vocals; guitar
- Years active: 2020–present
- Labels: 4AD; Memory Music; Brassland
- Formerly of: Stay Inside
- Website: barteesstrange.com

Bartees Leon Cox Jr. (born 1989), known professionally as Bartees Strange, is an English-born American musician. Strange was born in Ipswich, England, raised in Mustang, Oklahoma, and is based in Baltimore, Maryland.

== Early life ==
Strange was born in Ipswich, England, to a military father and opera-singer mother. The family moved from England to Germany, Greenland, and various US states, before settling in Mustang, Oklahoma, when Strange was 12.

Before becoming a musician, Strange worked as the director of communications for a nonprofit environmental organization in Washington, D.C.

== Career ==
While living in Brooklyn, Strange was a member of the post-hardcore band Stay Inside, from 2016 to 2018. In late 2017, he released his first solo effort, the acoustic folk EP Magic Boy, under the name Bartees & the Strange Fruit.

In March 2020, Strange released an EP of re-imagined covers of songs by the National, titled Say Goodbye to Pretty Boy, on Brassland. After being named an "Artist to Watch" by Stereogum in 2020, Strange released his debut full-length album, Live Forever, on October 2, 2020. Featuring a mix of hip hop, indie rock, and jazz music, the album received positive reviews. Strange toured throughout 2021 and 2022, supporting artists such as Lucy Dacus, Phoebe Bridgers, the National, Courtney Barnett, and Car Seat Headrest.

In 2022, Strange released his second album, Farm to Table, to critical acclaim. In 2025, he issued his latest record, titled Horror.

== Personal life ==
Strange is bisexual.

== Discography ==
=== Studio albums ===
- Live Forever (2020)
- Farm to Table (2022)
- Horror (2025)

=== EPs ===
- Magic Boy (2017) (as Bartees & the Strange Fruit)
- Say Goodbye to Pretty Boy (2020)
- Magic Boy (2024) (2017 EP in new configuration, with different art and additional music)
- Shy Bairns Get Nowt (2025)

=== Live albums ===
- Live at Studio 4 (2021)

=== Singles ===
As lead artist

Title	Year	Peak chart positions	Album
Title	Year	US AAA	Album
"About Today"	2020	—	Say Goodbye to Pretty Boy
"Lemonworld"	2020	—	Say Goodbye to Pretty Boy
"Going Going" / "HAGS"	2020	—	Non-album single
"The Geese of Beverly Road" / "Looking for Astronauts"	2020	—	Say Goodbye to Pretty Boy
"Mustang"	2020	—	Live Forever
"Boomer"	2020	—	Live Forever
"Kelly Rowland"	2020	—	Live Forever
"Weights"	2021	—	Live Forever (Deluxe)
"Province" (with Eric Slick & OHMME)	2021	—	Non-album single
"Heavy Heart"	2022	—	Farm to Table
"Cosigns"	2022	—	Farm to Table
"Daily News"	2023	—	Non-album single
"Lie 95"	2024	—	Horror
"Sober"	2024	—	Horror
"Too Much"	2024	—	Horror
"Xmas"	2024	—	Non-album single
"Wants Needs"	2025	—	Horror
"Backseat Banton"	2025	33	Horror

As featured artist

Title	Year	Album
"Plead Insanity" (Spring Silver featuring Bartees Strange and Sad13)	2020	Non-album singles
"Goldbrick Champion" (Broke Royals featuring Bartees Strange)	2020	Non-album singles
"love that 4 u" (altopalo featuring Bartees Strange)	2022	frenemy

Guest appearances

List of guest appearances as featured artist, with the respective artists and albums
Title	Year	Artist	Album
"It's Gold"	2020	Project Diem	Pluto
"Milky"	2020	Project Diem	Pluto
"Top of the World"	2020	Dave Hause	Patty
"Monsters"	2021	Hit Like a Girl	Heart Racer
"The Pearl"	2021	Lorenzo Wolff	Down Where the Valleys Are Low: Another Otherworld for Judee Sill
"You Always Hurt the One You Love"	2024	—N/a	The New Look (Apple TV+ Original Series Soundtrack)
"Big Glow"	2024	—N/a	I Saw the TV Glow
"Wolf Like Me"	2024	Anjimile, Kara Jackson	Transa
"You Are Special to Me"	2024	Cadence Weapon	ROLLERCOASTER

Remixes

Song	Year	Artist	Album	Title
"Bone Skull"	2021	Glass Beach	alchemist rats beg bashful (remixes)	Bartees Strange Remix
"Smartest Man" (featuring Arlissa)	2021	Homeschool	Homeschool: Book I	Bartees Strange Remix
"Pool"	2021	Samia	The Baby Reimagined	Bartees Strange Version
"Dreams"	2021	Hannah Georgas	All That Emotion Versions	Bartees Strange Remix
"Emergency Equipment & Exits"	2021	Ganser	Look at the Sun	Bartees Strange Remix
"Pool Hopping"	2021	Illuminati Hotties	Non-album singles	Strange Pool Remix
"Kyoto"	2021	Phoebe Bridgers	Non-album singles	Bartees Strange Remix
"Figure 8"	2023	Paramore	Re: This Is Why	Re: Bartees Strange

=== Production discography ===
Title	Year	Artist	Album	Role
"Good Luck Rd."	2021	Harmony Woods	GRACEFUL RAGE	Producer
"Rittenhouse"	2021	Harmony Woods	GRACEFUL RAGE	Producer
"Easy"	2021	Harmony Woods	GRACEFUL RAGE	Producer
"End"	2021	Harmony Woods	GRACEFUL RAGE	Producer
"Holding You to You"	2021	Harmony Woods	GRACEFUL RAGE	Producer
"God's Gift to Women"	2021	Harmony Woods	GRACEFUL RAGE	Producer
"Graceful Rage"	2021	Harmony Woods	GRACEFUL RAGE	Producer
"I Can't"	2021	Harmony Woods	GRACEFUL RAGE	Producer
"Mirror"	2022	Cinema Hearts	Your Ideal	Producer
"Your Ideal"	2022	Cinema Hearts	Your Ideal	Producer
"Everyday Is a Day Without You"	2022	Cinema Hearts	Your Ideal	Producer
"Can I Tell You I Love You"	2022	Cinema Hearts	Your Ideal	Producer
"Sister"	2022	Cinema Hearts	Your Ideal	Producer
"Morning"	2022	Oceanator	Nothing's Ever Fine	Producer
"Nightmare Machine"	2022	Oceanator	Nothing's Ever Fine	Producer
"The Last Summer"	2022	Oceanator	Nothing's Ever Fine	Producer
"Beach Days (Alive Again)"	2022	Oceanator	Nothing's Ever Fine	Producer
"Solar Flares"	2022	Oceanator	Nothing's Ever Fine	Producer
"Post Meridian"	2022	Oceanator	Nothing's Ever Fine	Producer
"Stuck"	2022	Oceanator	Nothing's Ever Fine	Producer
"From the Van"	2022	Oceanator	Nothing's Ever Fine	Producer
"Bad Brain Daze"	2022	Oceanator	Nothing's Ever Fine	Producer
"Summer Rain"	2022	Oceanator	Nothing's Ever Fine	Producer
"Evening"	2022	Oceanator	Nothing's Ever Fine	Producer
"You Good?"	2022	Proper.	The Great American Novel	Producer
"Shuck and Jive"	2022	Proper.	The Great American Novel	Producer, electric guitar
"Red, White, & Blue"	2022	Proper.	The Great American Novel	Producer, electric guitar
"Jean"	2022	Proper.	The Great American Novel	Producer
"McConnell"	2022	Proper.	The Great American Novel	Producer
"Ganymede"	2022	Proper.	The Great American Novel	Producer, electric guitar
"Barbershop Interlude"	2022	Proper.	The Great American Novel	Producer
"In the Van Somewhere Outside of Birmingham"	2022	Proper.	The Great American Novel	Producer
"Juvie"	2022	Proper.	The Great American Novel	Producer
"The Routine"	2022	Proper.	The Great American Novel	Producer
"Huerta"	2022	Proper.	The Great American Novel	Producer
"Milk & Honey"	2022	Proper.	The Great American Novel	Producer, synthesizer
"Done Talking"	2022	Proper.	The Great American Novel	Producer
"Americana"	2022	Proper.	The Great American Novel	Producer, synthesizer
"Yeah... I'm Good (Epilogue)"	2022	Proper.	The Great American Novel	Producer
"I Am Right on Time"	2024	Bleachers	Bleachers	Electric guitar, background vocals, drums
"We're Gonna Know Each Other Forever"	2024	Bleachers	Bleachers	Electric guitar, background vocals
"Tiny Moves"	2024	Bleachers	Bleachers	Acoustic guitar, electric guitar, synthesizer
"Alma Mater"	2024	Bleachers	Bleachers	Electric guitar, background vocals
"Cadence £∞™.mp3"	2024	Cadence Weapon	ROLLERCOASTER	Co-writer, producer
"YASTM.m4a"	2024	Cadence Weapon	ROLLERCOASTER	Writer, producer
"You Are Special to Me" (featuring Bartees Strange)	2024	Cadence Weapon	ROLLERCOASTER	Featured artist, writer, producer
"No One"	2024	Kacy Hill	Bug	Producer
"You Know I Love You Still"	2024	Kacy Hill	Bug	Co-writer
"Listen to You"	2024	Kacy Hill	Bug	Producer
"Frog Rinse"	2024	Kacy Hill	Bug	Producer
"Poquito Mas"	2024	Kacy Hill	Bug	Producer
"Improvement"	2024	Daphne Eckman	Non-album singles	Producer
"Juliet"	2024	Kacy Hill	Non-album singles	Co-writer
"Ankles"	2025	Lucy Dacus	Forever Is a Feeling	Recording engineer
"Best Guess"	2025	Lucy Dacus	Forever Is a Feeling	Producer, recording engineer, triangle

== Tours ==
Headlining

- 2021 tour

Supporting

- Phoebe Bridgers – Reunion Tour (2021)
- Lucy Dacus – 2021 tour
- Courtney Barnett – North American tour (2021)
- Car Seat Headrest – North American tour (2022)
- The National – 2022 tour
- Metric – The Doomscroller Tour (2022)
- Boygenius – The Tour (2023)
- The National – 2023 European tour
