= Kurt Ballou production discography =

This is a chronological list of the production discography of American musician and record producer Kurt Ballou, and doubles as a list of recordings made at GodCity Studio.

== 1990s ==
Year	Album	Band
1996	Jesuit	Jesuit
1998	When Forever Comes Crashing	Converge
1998	Beyond Hypothermia	Cave In
1998	The Huguenots	The Huguenots
1998	The Mosquito Control EP	Isis
1999	Jesuit	Jesuit
1999	Until Your Heart Stops	Cave In
1999	Flounders Flyers College & Canada	All Chrome
1999	Chaos Is Me	Orchid
1999	Division of Labor	Codeseven
1999	The Red Sea	Isis
1999	The Poacher Diaries	Converge
1999	Frozen Divide	Year of our Lord
1999	Sawblade	Isis

== 2000s ==
Year	Album	Band
2000	Rise of the Great Machine	Supermachiner
2000	Dance Tonight! Revolution Tomorrow!	Orchid
2000	A Mile in Cold Water	Garrison
2000	American Nightmare	American Nightmare
2000	The Huguenots / Sevenpercentsolution	The Huguenots
2000	Cold Blue	The Hope Conspiracy
2001	Self Esteem Through Modern Science	Blue/Green Heart
2001	Seminar II: The Holy Rites of Primitivism Regressionism	Old Man Gloom
2001	Seminar III: Zozobra	Old Man Gloom
2001	After the Storm	Sevenday Curse
2001	Deeper the Wound	Converge & Hellchild
2001	Document #8	Pg.99
2001	Piebald	Piebald
2001	Presents	Jeromes Dream
2001	Garrison / Hundred Reasons	Garrison
2001	Jane Doe	Converge
2001	File 03	The Hope Conspiracy
2001	Dying for It	Panic
2001	Final	Damage
2001	A Life Less Plagued	Carry On
2002	Best Record Ever	Drowningman
2002	The Audio Medium	The Cancer Conspiracy
2002	The Wind Blew All the Fires Out	Eulcid
2002	Learning to Accept Silence	In Pieces
2002	Unfortunately, We're Not Robots	Curl Up and Die
2002	The Treachery Pact	Eden Maine
2002	You're Not Looking So Good	Suicide Note
2002	Earth and Sphere	Beyond the Sixth Seal
2002	But a Whimper	Ramallah
2003	Breaking the Fourth Wall	Beecher
2003	Soldiers	Embrace Today
2003	We Sing the Body Electric	Since By Man
2003	The Past and Now	The Static Age
2003	Not Now, Not Ever	Another Breath
2003	The Whitest of Elephants	Examination of the...
2004	Rope Tied to the Trigger	Scars of Tomorrow
2004	Charmer	Breather Resist
2004	Behold The Fuck Thunder	The Great Redneck Hope
2004	Kamikaze Missions	Backstabbers Inc.
2004	Christmas	Old Man Gloom
2004	You Fail Me	Converge
2004	Sex Positions	Sex Positions
2004	Call Me Armageddon	The Power & The Glory
2004	Promises Kept	Champion
2005	The Lamb	Mi Amore
2005	This Elegy, His Autopsy	Beecher
2005	Petitioning the Empty Sky (Remaster)	Converge
2005	When Forever Comes Crashing (Remaster)	Converge
2005	Erase All Name and Likeness	Transistor Transistor
2005	Brood of Vipers	Seventh Star
2005	Witness	Modern Life Is War
2005	The Sirens of Silence	Swarm of the Lotus
2005	The Moon Is a Dead World	Gospel
2005	Black Thunder	Doomriders
2005	In Place Apart	Killing The Dream
2006	Dead Under Decor	Bleeding Kansas
2006	…Is My Co-pilot	The Punching Contest
2006	Dead Mountain Mouth	Genghis Tron
2006	Death Knows Your Name	The Hope Conspiracy
2006	Lost At Sea	In Dire Need
2006	No Heroes	Converge
2006	Substance	Betrayed
2006	Into Oblivion	Rise and Fall
2007	Peace on Earth, War on Stage	Blacklisted
2007	March Forth To Victory	The Freezing Fog
2007	Sleepwell Deconstructor	Trap Them
2007	The Undisputed Truth	Seventh Star
2007	This is Where the Fight Begins	The Ghost of a Thousand
2007	Animal	Animosity
2007	No Salvation	Coliseum
2007	The Emptiness	Samsara
2007	Séance Prime	Trap Them
2007	Don't Worry Lady	I Hate Sally
2007	A New Beat from a Dead Heart	108
2007	Redemption Through Looseness	Kruger
2007	Swears	The Casual Lean
2007	Discography	The Huguenots
2008	Live the Storm	Disfear
2008	Mount Hope	Pygmy Lush
2008	...I Carry	Adai
2008	Heavier Than Heaven, Lonelier Than God	Blacklisted
2008	Lion of Judas	Elysia
2008	Board Up the House	Genghis Tron
2008	Thaumaturgy	Dead or American
2008	Meanderthal	Torche
2008	Ruined Lives	Transistor Transistor
2008	Villains	Stray from the Path
2008	Traitors	Misery Index
2008	Thousands of Birds	Argument 5.45
2008	Songs to Scream at the Sun	Have Heart
2008	II – Tutti A Pezzi	La Crisi
2008	Seizures in Barren Praise	Trap Them
2008	Bishop Kent Manning	the_Network
2008	Old Wounds	Young Widows
2009	Black Eye Blues	Lewd Acts
2009	Spoils of Failure	Buried Inside
2009	Rust	Supermachiner
2009	Our Circle Is Vicious	Rise and Fall
2009	Magrudergrind	Magrudergrind
2009	Darkness Come Alive	Doomriders
2009	True Nihilist	The Hope Conspiracy
2009	Axe to Fall	Converge
2009	Amnesia	Paint It Black
2009	Surrender	Paint It Black
2009	Red in Tooth & Claw	BATS

== 2010s ==
Year	Album	Band
2010	Acid Tiger	Acid Tiger
2010	Heavy Breathing	Black Breath
2010	Filth Rations	Trap Them
2010	Kvelertak	Kvelertak
2010	Unsilent Death	Nails
2010	To The Open Hearts	You are in my September!
2010	18.61	108
2010	Solve et Coagula	The Secret
2010	Howl and Filth	Generation of Vipers
2010	All Pigs Must Die	All Pigs Must Die
2010	From Desperate Times Comes Radicial Minds	Pettybone
2011	The Day The War Is Over	SEVEN7STEPS
2011	Highway To Health	Pneu
2011	Venerable	KEN mode
2011	Darker Handcraft	Trap Them
2011	Algorithms	Meek is Murder
2011	Old Friends	Pygmy Lush
2011	God Is War	All Pigs Must Die
2011	Discography	Jesuit
2011	Trenchfoot	Trenchfoot
2011	Invernal	Black Cobra
2011	This Old Earthquake	The Fear and Trembling
2011	Pain is a Warning	Today is the Day
2012	Sentenced To Life	Black Breath
2012	De Vermis Mysteriis	High on Fire
2012	Faith	Rise and Fall
2012	Rotten Thing To Say	Burning Love
2012	Harmonicraft	Torche
2012	No Absolutes in Human Suffering	Gaza
2012	No	Old Man Gloom
2012	Love Is Love/Return to Dust	Code Orange Kids
2012	All We Love We Leave Behind	Converge
2012	Agnus Dei	The Secret
2013	Bushcraft	Baptists
2013	Howl	This Routine Is Hell
2013	Abandon All Life	Nails
2013	Fever Hunting	Modern Life Is War
2013	Meir	Kvelertak
2013	When the Landscape is Quiet Again	Sleeping In Gethsemane
2013	Eros/Anteros	Oathbreaker
2013	Nice Hooves	Nice Hooves
2013	Everything is Awesome Nothing Matters	Meek is Murder
2013	Nothing Violates This Nature	All Pigs Must Die
2013	Akrasia EP	Immortal Bird
2013	Fiction or Truth ?	Castles
2013	Chemistry of Consciousness	Toxic Holocaust
2013	Serpents Unleashed	Skeletonwitch
2014	Crystalline	Hark
2014	Prayer for Terrene	Idylls
2014	Oblation	Floor
2014	Blissfucker	Trap Them
2014	From Parts Unknown	Every Time I Die
2014	Seizures Within Reason	Empty Vessels
2014	Splinters	Vallenfyre
2014	I Am King	Code Orange
2014	Tyranny of Will	Iron Reagan
2014	Bloodmines	Baptists
2014	Poison Everything	Obliterations
2014	Silence in the Ancestral House	Occultation
2014	The Ape of God	Old Man Gloom
2015	La Ira	Hamlet
2015	Restarter	Torche
2015	Rust	Harm's Way
2015	Four Year Strong	Four Year Strong
2015	Untitled	The Armed
2015	Luminiferous	High on Fire
2015	Heaven Is Earth	Self Defense Family
2015	Lightless Walk	Cult Leader
2015	S/T 7"	Expander
2015	Bleeder	Mutoid Man
2015	Slaves Beyond Death	Black Breath
2015	The Gall	Nice Hooves
2016	What One Becomes	Sumac
2016	You Fail Me Redux	Converge
2016	Awake for Everything	Hesitation Wounds
2016	You Will Never Be One of Us	Nails
2016	Crown Feral	Trap Them
2016	Guidance	Russian Circles
2016	Once Love Was Lost	Vorvaň
2016	Was	Meek is Murder
2016	Sonoran Depravation	Gatecreeper
2016	Dissociation	The Dillinger Escape Plan
2016	Cinemechanica	Cinemechanica
2017	Forever	Code Orange
2017	Godless Prophets & the Migrant Flora	Darkest Hour
2017	Trumpeting Ecstasy	Full of Hell
2017	Through the Mirror	Endon
2017	Endless Computer	Expander
2017	War Moans	Mutoid Man
2017	RIPHOUSE	Break City Drowwners
2017	Hiss Spun	Chelsea Wolfe
2017	No Cure for Death	SECT
2017	Hostage Animal	All Pigs Must Die
2018	Only Love	The Armed
2018	Stranger Fruit	Zeal & Ardor
2018	Million Dollars to Kill Me	Joyce Manor
2018	Beautiful Ruin	Converge
2018	Love in Shadow	Sumac
2018	Electric Messiah	High on Fire
2018	A Patient Man	Cult Leader
2019	Weeping Choir	Full of Hell
2019	The Grand Descent	Fuming Mouth
2019	Ex Voto	Djunah
2019	Blood Year	Russian Circles

== 2020s ==
Year	Album	Band
2020	Shadow of Life	Umbra Vitae
2020	Seminar IX: Darkness of Being (selected tracks)	Old Man Gloom
2020	Seminar VIII: Light of Meaning (selected tracks)	Old Man Gloom
2020	Internal Incarceration	Year of the Knife
2020	Workstation to Workstation	Boston Typewriter Orchestra
2020	May You Be Held	Sumac
2021	Ultrapop	The Armed
2021	Bloodmoon: I	Converge
2022	The Loser	Gospel
2022	Heavy Pendulum	Cave In
2022	We're Not Here to Be Loved	Fleshwater
2022	Gnosis	Russian Circles
2022	Angels Hung from the Arches of Heaven	Goatwhore
2023	No Love Lost	Year of the Knife
2023	Repent	Affliction Lane
2023	Mutants	Mutoid Man
2023	Last Day of Sun	Fuming Mouth
2024	Cometh The Storm	High on Fire
2024	Light of Death	Umbra Vitae
2024	Dark Superstition	Gatecreeper
2024	Guilt Shrine	Generation of Vipers
2024	Every Bridge Burning	Nails
2024	Dreams on Algorithms	Escuela Grind
2024	Teeth	Babel Map
2025	Cuzco	Jackal Twins
2025	2000:In Search Of The Endless Sky	Fleshwater
2026	Love Is Not Enough	Converge
2026	Hum of Hurt	Converge
2026	Marrow Deep	Mastodon
2026	kWh	Regulator Watts
