= Ben Koller =

American drummer (born 1980)

- Koller with Converge at Roadburn Festival 2018

Background information
- Also known as: Benjamin Koller
- Born: July 29, 1980 (age 46)
- Origin: Massachusetts, U.S.
- Genres: Heavy metal; thrash metal; groove metal; death metal; grindcore; metalcore; hardcore punk; post-hardcore
- Occupation: Musician
- Instrument: Drums
- Years active: 1997–present
- Member of: Converge; All Pigs Must Die; Mutoid Man; Killer Be Killed; High on Fire
- Formerly of: United Nations; Cave In; Acid Tiger

Benjamin Koller (born July 29, 1980) is an American drummer who has played with Converge, Mutoid Man, Killer Be Killed, All Pigs Must Die, and High on Fire. He started playing a full drum kit at age 14.

== Career ==
=== Early bands (1997–1999) ===
Koller played in the bands Where's Ben? and Bastian, before playing in the grindcore band Force Fed Glass. He started playing for the band in 1997. Converge guitarist Kurt Ballou, who is also a successful producer, recorded an album for Force Fed Glass. Ballou later started a side project called Blue/Green Heart and selected Koller as his drummer having already been familiar with his talent from Force Fed Glass. Blue/Green Heart only released one demo album, Self Esteem Through Modern Science.

=== Converge (1999–present) ===
Koller joined Converge in late 1999, replacing John DiGiorgio. Kurt Ballou selected Koller to temporarily fill-in while Converge searched for a more permanent replacement for Bellorado, as he was familiar with his work in previous bands, Force Fed Glass and Blue/Green Heart, a band that Ballou and Koller played in together. After working well with the band during some local shows in Boston, Converge made him an official member. Koller's first studio release with Converge was 2001's Jane Doe released through Equal Vision Records.

=== All Pigs Must Die (2009–present) ===
All Pigs Must Die is a heavy metal band composed of Kevin Baker of The Hope Conspiracy and Ben Koller in addition to Adam Wentworth and Matt Woods of Bloodhorse. The former of which is also a part of Acid Tiger. All Pigs Must Die is signed to Nonbeliever Records, an imprint label of Shirts & Destroy. Their debut EP, which was recorded at Ballou's GodCity studios, was released in October 2010. In 2011, they released their first full-length called God Is War.

=== Mutoid Man (2012–present) ===
Koller recorded some songs as a two-piece band with Stephen Brodsky of Cave In in mid-2012 under the name Mutoid Man. The project was properly announced in March 2013, and its debut EP, Helium Head, was released in November 2013 through Magic Bullet Records. Describing the sound of the new project, Brodsky said, "The material picks up from where we left off with the Cave In Shapeshifter/Dead Already cassingle, written with Ben in the band. The two of us ran with that sound and formula and took it as far as we could go." Koller and Brodsky were later joined by bassist Nick Cageao to form a three-piece band, and released their first full-length album Bleeder on June 30, 2015, through Sargent House. The band released their second full-length album, War Moans, in June 2017.

== Additional projects and contributions ==
In 2005, Cave In drummer John-Robert Conners left the band after a wrist injury that prevented him from being able to play. Ben Koller became his temporary replacement during Cave In's tour in support of their fourth studio album, Perfect Pitch Black. Before the group went on hiatus in 2006, the band recorded two songs with Koller. The two songs, "Dead Already" and "Shapeshifter", were released together on a limited edition cassette single sold during 2005 and 2006 tours. Conners returned to Cave In when they reunited in 2009.

Acid Tiger is Koller's psychedelic punk side project with Lukas Previn (The A.K.A.s), Adam Wentworth (Bloodhorse / All Pigs Must Die), and J Rattlesnake. Previn described the band as having, "no plan or guideline for us other than getting our friends in a room and playing all the riffs we had that didn't work for the other bands we are in." Acid Tiger signed to Deathwish Inc. in July 2009, and released their self-titled debut on April 27, 2010.

In 2010, Koller became the temporary touring replacement for John-Robert Conners in his side project Doomriders.

He filled in for Killer Be Killed's drummer Dave Elitch for their 2015 Soundwave performance. He later became the full time drummer on July 30, 2015.

Koller recorded drums for the 2017 album "Only Love" with The Armed.

Koller recorded drums for the Carpenter Brut song "Leather Terror" in 2022.

== Discography ==
=== With Force Fed Glass ===
- When Backs Are Turned, Knives Are Pulled (1998)
- The Self Destruct EP (1999)
- Discography (2003)

=== With Blue/Green Heart ===
- Self Esteem Through Modern Science (2001)

=== With Converge ===
- Jane Doe (2001)
- You Fail Me (2004)
- No Heroes (2006)
- Axe to Fall (2009)
- All We Love We Leave Behind (2012)
- The Dusk in Us (2017)
- Blood Moon (2021)
- Love Is Not Enough (2026)
- Hum of Hurt (2026)

=== With Cave In ===
- "Dead Already" / "Shapeshifter" (2005)

=== With United Nations ===
- United Nations (2008)
- Never Mind the Bombings, Here's Your Six Figures (2010, EP)

=== With Acid Tiger ===
- Acid Tiger (2010)

=== With All Pigs Must Die ===
- All Pigs Must Die (2010)
- God Is War (2011)
- Nothing Violates This Nature (2013)
- Hostage Animal (2017)

=== With Mutoid Man ===
- Helium Head (2013)
- Bleeder (2015)
- War Moans (2017)
- Mutants (2023)

=== With Killer Be Killed ===
- Reluctant Hero (2020)

=== Collaborations ===
Year	Artist	Release	Additional information
2018	The Armed	Only Love	Drums on album
2020	Greg Puciato	Child Soldier: Creator Of God	Drums on "Roach Hiss"
