= All Pigs Must Die =

All Pigs Must Die may refer to:

- All Pigs Must Die (band), an American hardcore band from the 2010s
  - All Pigs Must Die (EP), a self-titled 2010 EP from the above band
- All Pigs Must Die (album), a 2001 album from the English band Death in June
