= Endnote (disambiguation) =

An endnote is a note or reference placed at the end of a text or major text section.

Endnote, EndNote, or Endnotes may also refer to:

- Endnote (album), an album by Boston hardcore band The Hope Conspiracy
- EndNote, a reference management software package
- Endnotes (journal), a communist theoretical journal
