= Witness (Modern Life Is War album) =

Studio album by Modern Life Is War
- Released: 2005
- Genre: Hardcore punk, melodic hardcore
- Length: 27:01
- Label: Deathwish (DWI45)

Modern Life Is War chronology
My Love. My Way. (2003)	Witness (2005)	Midnight in America (2007)

Witness is the second album released by Iowa hardcore quintet Modern Life Is War, released in 2005 via Deathwish Inc. This is the last M.L.I.W. album to feature Chris Honeck on bass and Matt Hoffman on guitar, as both members would leave the band after the album's release. The album cover was created by Converge singer J. Bannon, and features an image of Main Street, Marshalltown - the city in Iowa where the band members are from - taken in 1896.

Building on the success and hype of M.L.I.W.'s previous album, 2003's My Love. My Way., Witness became a watershed record for the band, selling well in hardcore circles and achieving acclaim from numerous music publications and website reviews. It is normally considered the band's finest release.

The song "Martin Atchet" is based on Peter Milligan's graphic novel Skin, which revolves around the story of a young skinhead, Martin Atchitson, who grew up in 1970's London with thalidomide-related birth defects.

To commemorate its 10th anniversary, Modern Life is War reissued a remastered version of the album with updated packaging and liner notes on June 2, 2015 followed by a nine-date North American tour.

== Track listing ==
No.	Title	Length
1.	"The Outsiders (AKA Hell Is for Heroes Part I)"	3:11
2.	"Martin Atchet"	2:36
3.	"John and Jimmy"	1:53
4.	"Marshalltown"	3:48
5.	"D.E.A.D.R.A.M.O.N.E.S."	2:20
6.	"Young Man on a Spree"	1:35
7.	"I'm Not Ready"	2:53
8.	"Young Man Blues"	3:10
9.	"Hair Raising Accounts of Restless Ghosts (AKA Hell Is for Heroes Part II)"	5:35

Japanese Bonus Tracks
No.	Title	Length
10.	"Late Bloomers (Re-recorded version)"
11.	"Nervous Breakdown" (Black Flag cover)

== Reception ==
Professional ratings
Review scores
Source	Rating
Sputnikmusic	5/5 stars
Punknews.org	4/5 stars

Critical reception regarding Witness has been almost universally positive. Richard Craig from Sputnik Music gave Witness a 5 out of 5 review, describing the album as "quite possibly the greatest hardcore album of our generation. Witness will cement M.L.I.W.'s status for years to come as hardcore greats."

Lambgoat.com summarized the album as "the fulfillment of whatever potential Modern Life Is War may have shown on their debut," going on to praise the band's songwriting chops and overall production quality of the album: "The tastefully minimal instrumentation of the percussion-driven 'Young Man on a Spree' creates a restrained rage and tension as powerful as the disc's loudest moments . . . The tones are all immaculate, and there are no extraneous studio tricks to keep the music from speaking for itself. Witness sounds raw and heartfelt without sounding like garbage."

Scene Point Blank commended the album for its powerful emotional edge, writing "Witness breaks boundaries and surpasses dreams hardcore has not even had yet. It is eloquent and beautiful in every way. You will get choked up the first time you hear it."

Reviewers for Punknews.org were the most blunt with their praise, simply stating that "if every album could be like Witness, then maybe music wouldn’t suck as bad is it does right now."

== Personnel ==
- Chris Honeck - Bass
- Matt Hoffman - Guitar
- John Eich - Guitar
- Tyler Oleson - Drums
- Jeffrey Eaton - Vocals
- Recorded at Volume and Godcity by Sanford and Kurt Ballou
- Mixed at Godcity by Kurt Ballou
- Mastered at West West Side by Alan Douches
- Sleeve design by Jacob Bannon
