= Modern Life Is War =

American hardcore punk band

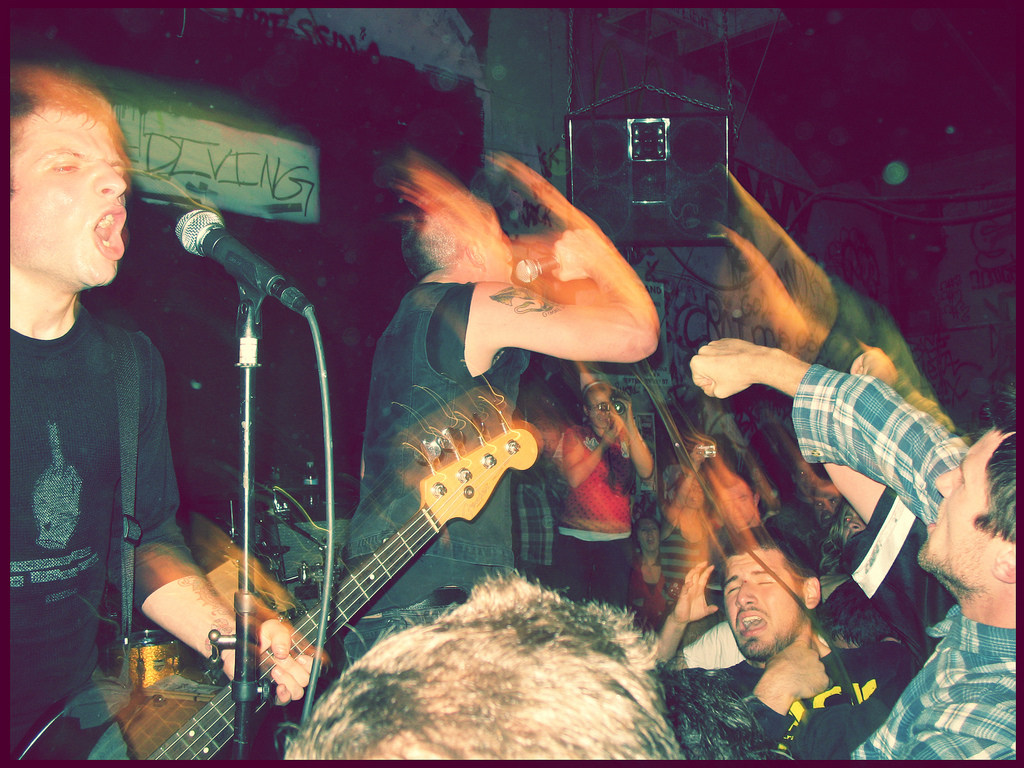
- Modern Life Is War live in 2007

Background information
- Origin: Marshalltown, Iowa, U.S.
- Genres: Melodic hardcore; hardcore punk
- Years active: 2002–2008, 2012–present
- Labels: Equal Vision, Deathwish, Martyr, Iodine
- Members: Jeffrey Eaton; John Paul Eich; Bo Becker; Chris Honeck; Luke Rauch
- Past members: Sjarm 13; Tim Churchman; Matt Hoffman

Modern Life Is War is an American hardcore punk band formed in Marshalltown, Iowa, in 2002. During Modern Life Is War's six-year original run, the band released three full-length albums and one self-titled 7-inch EP. Despite a growing profile on the underground hardcore circuit, and garnering critical acclaim from numerous musical outlets, Modern Life Is War announced its dissolution in early 2008; however, the band reunited in 2012.

== History ==
Modern Life Is War's self-titled 7-inch E.P. was released through Lifeline Records in early 2002. Its two subsequent studio albums, 2003's My Love. My Way. and 2005's Witness are now available through the Deathwish Inc. record label, which is owned and operated by Converge singer Jacob Bannon.

In mid-2005, after the release of Witness, guitarist Matt Hoffman and bassist Chris Honeck left the band. They were replaced by Sjarm 13 and Tim Churchman, respectively. On February 9, 2007, M.L.I.W. announced that it had signed a record deal with Equal Vision Records. The band's third full-length album, Midnight in America, was released on August 21, 2007, to positive reviews.

On February 19, 2008, the band announced its intentions to break up on its Myspace page.

In September 2012, the original lineup reunited and wrote an album in John Eich's basement. Modern Life Is War formally announced its reunion in April 2013 and the intent to record and release the new album through Deathwish by September 2013. The band did not expect to heavily tour during the reunion; as of April 2013, Modern Life Is War was only booked to headline This Is Hardcore Festival and a record release show. Retrospectively, Modern Life Is War wished they had not broken up, but instead scaled back their efforts so they could do it, "without so much stress and life crushing commitment." The band released its fourth studio album Fever Hunting on September 9, 2013, through Deathwish, which was produced by Kurt Ballou of Converge. Modern Life Is War embarked on a six-date tour in celebration of the new album in October 2013.

To commemorate its 10th anniversary, Modern Life is War reissued a remastered version of their 2005 album Witness with updated packaging and liner notes on June 2, 2015, followed by a nine-date North American tour.

On June 13, 2025, the band announced their fifth studio album, Life On The Moon, released on September 5 of the same year through Deathwish and Iodine Recordings.

== Musical style and influences ==
Critics categorise Modern Life is War's music as melodic hardcore. They have cited influences including American Nightmare, the Hope Conspiracy, Descendents, Black Flag, Hüsker Dü, Tragedy, Unbroken, Ruination, Youth of Today, Judge, Alone in the Crowd, Gorilla Biscuits, the Trouble, Rancid, Operation Ivy, the Clash, Dillinger Four, Billy Bragg, the Jam and the Specials.

== Members ==
Current

- Jeffrey Eaton – vocals
- John Paul Eich – guitar
- Bo Becker – guitar
- Chris Honeck – bass
- Luke Rauch – drums

Former

- Sjarm 13 (Harm Haverman) – guitar
- Tim Churchman – bass
- Brad Highnam – bass
- Matt Hoffman - guitar
- Tyler Oleson – drums

== Discography ==
Studio albums

- My Love. My Way. (2003)
- Witness (2005)
- Midnight in America (2007)
- Fever Hunting (2013)
- Life on the Moon (2025)

EPs

- Modern Life Is War (2002)
- Tribulation Work Songs Vol. 1 (2018)
- Tribulation Work Songs Vol. 2 (2018)
- Tribulation Work Songs Vol. 3 (2021)

Singles

- "Stagger Lee" (2007)

Music videos

- "Fuck the Sex Pistols" (2008)
- "Feels Like End Times" (2018)
- "Survival" (2021)
