= Black Breath (band) =

American metal band

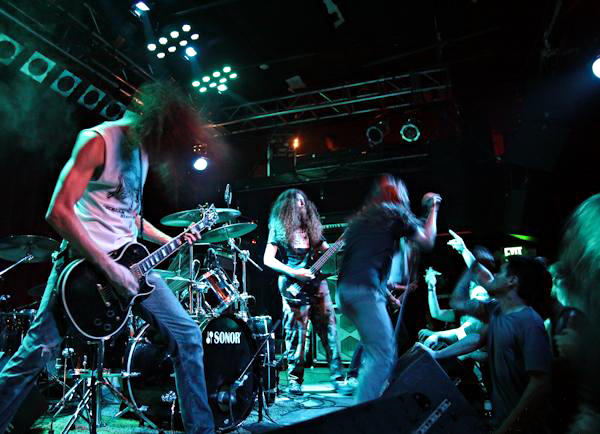
- Black Breath in 2010

Background information
- Origin: Bellingham, Washington, U.S.
- Genres: Crust punk; death 'n' roll; death metal; thrash metal
- Years active: 2006–present
- Label: Southern Lord
- Members: Neil McAdams; Eric Wallace; Mark Palm; Jamie Byrum
- Past members: Zack Muljat; Brian Slodysko; Josh Holland; Elijah Nelson
- Website: blackbreath.com

Black Breath is an American extreme metal band from Washington that formed in Bellingham in 2006 and later moved to Seattle. They play crust punk-influenced death metal. A key factor of their sound is the "Boss HM-2 Heavy Metal Pedal", popularized by bands such as Entombed, Dismember and Edge of Sanity in the early 1990s.

== History ==
Black Breath began in 2005, playing local bars and house shows in Bellingham. They released a few demos and toured the underground before recording an EP in 2008. In 2008, they released the Razor to Oblivion EP under their own label, Hot Mass Records. The EP gained attention in the local music underground and the band signed with Southern Lord Records, a Los Angeles-based metal and hardcore punk-oriented label, in October 2009. Black Breath toured across the country to support the EP as a support act for Victims, Rise and Fall, and Trap Them. Southern Lord took over the distribution of the EP, which was re-released under the new label. Black Breath went to the east coast to record their debut album, Heavy Breathing, at GodCity Studios, owned by Converge guitarist Kurt Ballou. Heavy Breathing was released on March 30, 2010, by Southern Lord. Their second album, Sentenced To Life, was released March 27, 2012, also on Southern Lord Records. In October 2014, it was announced that Black Breath would return to GodCity Studios to record their follow up, Slaves Beyond Death, for an early 2015 release. Bassist Elijah Nelson was found dead on December 29, 2019.

== Discography ==
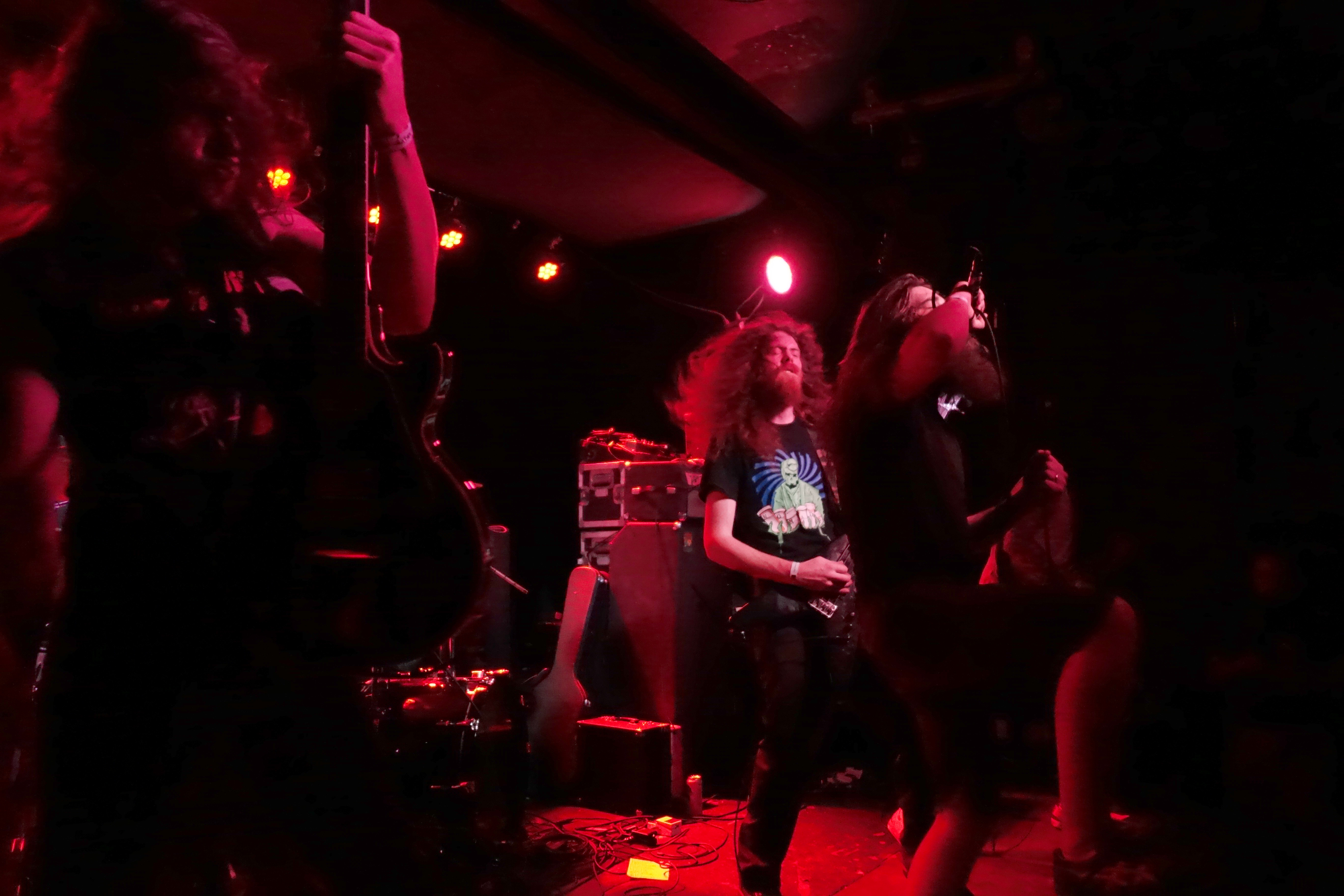
Black Breath performing at the Saint Vitus Bar in Brooklyn, New York, 2015

- Razor to Oblivion EP (2008)
- Heavy Breathing (2010)
- Sentenced to Life (2012)
- Slaves Beyond Death (2015)

== Music videos ==
- "Home of the Grave" (2012)
