= Darker Handcraft =

- External slipcase cover

Studio album by Trap Them
- Released: March 1, 2011
- Recorded: September 2010 at God City Studio in Salem, Massachusetts
- Genre: Grindcore, crust punk
- Length: 31:05
- Label: Prosthetic (#10091)
- Producer: Kurt Ballou

Trap Them chronology
Filth Rations (2010)	Darker Handcraft (2011)	Blissfucker (2014)

Professional ratings
Aggregate scores
Source	Rating
Metacritic	(79/100)
Review scores
Source	Rating
AbsolutePunk.net	91%
Allmusic	4/5 stars
Decibel	(9/10)
Revolver	4/5 stars
Rock Sound	(8/10)

Darker Handcraft is the third studio album by the American grindcore band Trap Them. The album was first released in a vinyl LP format on March 1, 2011 and on CD and digital formats two weeks later on March 15, 2011 through Prosthetic Records. It's also the group's first release through Prosthetic after announcing their departure from Deathwish Inc. in 2009. Darker Handcraft was produced by Kurt Ballou of Converge.

Darker Handcraft is the only Trap Them album recorded with drummer Chris Maggio formerly of the hardcore band Coliseum. Vocalist Ryan McKenny observed a stronger bond among band members with the addition of Maggio. McKenny noted that, during the writing process, Trap Them was focused and never got mad at one another.

== Track listing ==
All lyrics are written by Ryan McKenny; all music is composed by Trap Them.

No.	Title	Length
1.	"Day 42 - Damage Prose"	2:37
2.	"Day 44 - Slumcult and Gather"	3:23
3.	"Day 41 - Every Walk a Quarantine"	2:55
4.	"Day 43 - Evictionaries"	2:53
5.	"Day 32 - All by the Constant Vulse"	3:30
6.	"Day 34 - Sordid Earnings"	1:32
7.	"Day 33 - The Facts"	3:23
8.	"Day 35 - Saintpeelers"	1:15
9.	"Day 46 - Manic in the Grips"	0:58
10.	"Day 37 - Sovereign Through the Pines"	1:36
11.	"Day 47 - Drag the Wounds Eternal"	2:35
12.	"Day 36 - Scars Align"	4:28

== Reception ==
Darker Handcraft has received mainly positive reviews, from many critics. AllMusic stated "Trap Them and their ilk are bound to leave many happily damaged eardrums before they runs their course". Dre Okorley of AbsolutePunk remarked "Darker Handcraft deciphers what Leatherface turned into his special forte: it stretches skin and curdles blood like it's a walk in the park". Though minor flaws were noted in the album, it appeared in the upper percentile of the majority of heavy music sites.

== Personnel ==
Trap Them

- Brian Izzi – guitar
- Stephen Lacour – bass
- Chris Maggio – drums
- Ryan McKenney – vocals

Additional personnel

- Kevin Baker (The Hope Conspiracy) – guest vocals on "Evictionaries"
- Kurt Ballou – engineering, production
- Scott Hull – mastering at Visceral Sound
- Vberkvlt – artwork
