= Acid Tiger =

American rock supergroup

- Genres: Punk rock; psychedelic rock
- Years active: 2009–2010
- Labels: Deathwish
- Members: Ben Koller; Lukas Previn; Adam Wentworth; J. Rattlesnake

Acid Tiger is an American rock supergroup composed of Ben Koller (Converge, All Pigs Must Die), Lukas Previn (Thursday, United Nations), Adam Wentworth (Bloodhorse, All Pigs Must Die) and J. Rattlesnake.

Previn described the band as having "no plan or guideline for us other than getting our friends in a room and playing all the riffs we had that didn't work for the other bands we are in." Acid Tiger signed to Deathwish Inc. in July 2009, and released their self-titled debut on April 27, 2010.

== Self-titled album ==
Acid Tiger

Studio album by Acid Tiger
- Released: April 27, 2010
- Genre: Punk rock, psychedelic rock
- Length: 39:48
- Label: Deathwish (DW97)
- Producer: Kurt Ballou

Acid Tiger is the self-titled debut studio album by American supergroup Acid Tiger. It was released on April 27, 2010, through Deathwish Inc., a label that was co-founded by Jacob Bannon of Converge. The album has been compared to 1990s math rock and the psychedelic rock band The Doors.

=== Reception ===
Professional ratings
Review scores
Source	Rating
Alternative Press	0.5/5 stars
Exclaim!	(mixed)
Punknews.org	2/5 stars
Rock Sound	8/10

The album received generally negative or mixed reviews by music critics. Casey Boland of Alternative Press gave the album a half-star-out-of-five and stated: "The more we listen to Acid Tiger, the more it appears these songs were conceived with tongue firmly in cheek (and bong tightly in hand). Acid Tiger might have been a blast to record, but at times, it's a bust to listen to. It's a shame, since Acid Tiger demonstrate the potential to update and elevate a rock genre mostly ruined by scads of hairspray-loving bands throughout the '80s." Brian "inagreendase" of Punknews.org gave the album two-out-of-five stars and stated: "Even with 11 minutes and two tracks of incessant noodling and phasing to go on Acid Tiger's self-titled debut, its listener will have been thoroughly exhausted. Or rocked. But probably just tired and annoyed. There's a great deal of promise Acid Tiger's members bear, but this is just not the fruition of it. Except for maybe Ballou--shit sounds good, at least." Keith Carman of Exclaim! gave the album a mixed review and stated that ultimately, "Acid Tiger have the capability of piquing interest, but sustaining it might be a bit more difficult with the "Jack of all trades, master of none" approach they currently adhere to." However, Kevin Stewart-Panko of Rock Sound gave the album a positive eight-out-of-ten and stated: "It would be a shame to dismiss Acid Tiger based on where they lay their heads because they have a healthy pedigree (including Converge's Ben Koller on drums) and infuse their raunchy punk with the white-knuckled rhythms of Grand Funk Railroad and a blazing up-tempo psychedelic sizzle. You can dance, drink, fight and fuck to it, plus it'll put hair on your chest. What more do you need?"

=== Track listing ===
1. "The Claw" – 4:00
2. "Dark Hands" – 4:49
3. "Like Thunder" – 3:38
4. "Big Beat" – 6:26
5. "Death Wave" – 9:17
6. "Feel It" – 5:14
7. "Set Sail" – 6:24
