= Dead or American =

Dead or American is an alternative rock band from Stirling, Scotland, formed in January 2000. They are also frequently referred to as "DorA".

== History ==
Dead or American's founding members Richard Carlin, Greg Heuer, Chris Cusack and Colin Morrison came together in the first week of January, 2000. The band rehearsed without a name until April of that same year, assuming the moniker "Dead or American" supposedly based on a dream of Heuer's in which he found himself playing in band of the same name. Heuer has 2 beautiful daughters named Rachael(2001) and Chloe(2008) Shortly after his departure from the band in 2003, the remaining members corrected that story, citing a quote about globalisation in which it was apparently claimed that in 20 years, most cultures will be Dead or American.

After leaving the group for personal reasons in 2003 Heuer was replaced by mutual friend Richard Bruce, also bassist with Bad Taste Records' Turtlehead, who had recently returned from an extended tour of Europe. Bruce played a number of live shows with DorA and performed on the band's first official release, "Subdivide", recorded at Homegrown Studios with James "Andy" Taylor. He departed in 2003 to focus on his Turtlehead commitments and was replaced by Tom "Faz" Farrington, another long-term friend of the group and bassist with alternative-metal outfit Fractal Jack.

Farrington was hired on the understanding that his tenure would be temporary due to his other musical and academic commitments. His replacement was eventually found in the shape of Peter McCulloch who officially became part of DorA in 2004. McCulloch came from a musical family with whom the founding members of Dead or American were already familiar. He quickly struck up a good working relationship with drummer Carlin and the band settled into a period of relatively productive stability.

== "Ends" ==
Recording of a debut album was soon underway, undertaken at McCulloch's family home which also served as a rehearsal space known as Baad Farm. The recording sessions were engineered by Ross Rankin and Chris Reilly of cult Glaswegian electro-prog group Titus Gein. Technical problems with recording led to a full retake, with only "Two Minutes Past Nine" surviving from the original sessions to make it to the album. Some months behind schedule, the band opted to mix the record with (future bassist) Pete Flett.

Unfortunately the recordings were not short of problems and the mixing sessions were beset with delays as a result. With interest being shown by a number of small labels, the band members were impatient to finish the sessions. After almost four months of intensive mixing and rerecording, with Flett and Cusack working around the clock, definitive versions were finally produced. Mastering was carried out in New York by Alan Douches of West West Side Audio. A joint-release deal was finally agreed between Predestination and fledgling Dundee label Pet Piranha, the DorA members feeling PP's current momentum and better distribution through Cargo Records (UK) would be beneficial to the album's success.

"Ends" was finally released in November 2006, almost two years after its recording sessions had originally begun. By the time it came out, Dead or American had already completed recording on their second album.

At the end of 2010 "Ends" was voted the 48th best Scottish album of the past decade by 'The Skinny' magazine.

== "Thaumaturgy" ==
Having secured the backing of The Scottish Arts Council, DorA were awarded a grant towards the costs of recording their second full-length record in Salem, Massachusetts, with cult producer Kurt Ballou, also guitarist in progressive hardcore band Converge.

Sessions for the second album, entitled "Thaumaturgy", began in mid-October 2006. Ten tracks were recorded in ten days using a combination of digital and analogue technology insisted on by the band. Ballou's studio, Godcity, was known in musical circles for having very high quality, rare equipment which the members of DorA were given access to. The common perception afterwards was that this record benefitted greatly from Ballou's mentorship and the superior gear at the band's disposal. "Thaumaturgy" was mastered in early 2007 by Nick Zampiello in Boston. The release was delayed to allow Dead or American to tour in support of "Ends" which, by this stage, had only been widely available for a few months. "Thaumaturgy" ultimately came out on 6 November 2008 and was accompanied by DorA's first European tour.

Following the recording sessions in the USA the three founding members parted ways with McCulloch. He was quickly replaced by former engineer Flett, whose familiarity with the material made him an obvious choice.

== Notable Supports ==
Dead or American supported many artists over a nine-year period, including Oxes, Maypole, Lapsus Linguae, Jetplane Landing, Marmaduke Duke, The Icarus Line, Reuben, Dogs Die in Hot Cars and Thoria.

== Notable Press ==
- Rocksound Magazine reviewed both DorA's albums. 'Ends' received an 8/10, the reviewer had this to say:"…their sound is nothing short of compelling. Their songs are intelligently arranged and layered with thick textures and angular instrumentation that make for a thoroughly absorbing listen. Should they step out of the shadows of their forebears, this band are capable of greatness." (ROCKSOUND Magazine, November 2006). "Thaumaturgy" also received 8/10. Reviewer, Tim Newbound, summarising with, "Accomplished, intelligent, and thoroughly entertaining stuff.",
- Powerplay Magazine gave 'Ends' a 7/10 (Issue 83) while it gave 'Thaumaturgy' an 8/10 (Issue 106).
- Drowned in Sound had the following to say about Ends:"Ends is, to summarise succinctly early on, fairly breathtaking at times and consistently satisfying throughout. These songs bounce and bomb like the best Biffy Clyro efforts so-far laid to tape, albeit mercifully without the over-egging, and resonate with the proper post-hardcore emotional force of Small Brown Bike, Burning Airlines, At The Drive-In, et cetera. Never overly complex, they're immediate affairs that suck you in swiftly and choose not to let you loose 'til the always-worth-it climax." (Drowned in Sound, November 2006)
- The Skinny Magazine reviewed both 'Ends' and 'Thaumaturgy' and awarded both records 4 stars out of 5.

== BBC: Live in Session ==
In December 2008, Vic Galloway invited Dead or American into the BBC studios in Glasgow to perform a live session.

The band chose to play two tracks from the album "Thaumaturgy": 'Shibboleth' and 'Creep Eastward'. However, being a special Christmas edition of the show, Galloway requested that the band write two new tracks exclusively for the show, with a Christmas theme to them. The band wrote the tracks, "Relanativity" and "Unwanted Presence".

Both these tracks were properly demo'd with a view to being further developed for future release.

== Predestination Records ==
Dead or American attracted praise in underground circles for their dedication to DIY ethics and they continue to work according to those principles under the guise of their label Predestination Records. That label was started by the latter-day line-up of the group, joined by David Newitt, a respected and published photographer of live music from Central Scotland.

Dead or American's "Subdivide" was originally released in 2003 bearing a logo for Predestination Records, but the label did not formally come into existence until August 2005. The first release from this date was Premeditation Vol:1, a compilation of underground acts from across the United Kingdom, with an emphasis on Scottish peers. It included songs by Loss Leader, Brendan O'Hare's Macrocosmica and Laeto. The compilation was funded jointly by the bands involved and the label itself, with resultant profits split equally between the contributing parties. Premeditation Vol:1 was followed in 2007 by Premeditation Vol:2, another collection of artists made along the same lines as the original, with the inclusion of two French acts. This second installment featured work by Lapsus Linguae, Gâtechien and Take A Worm For A Walk Week amongst others.

The label continues to release and distribute the work of various underground acts from across the globe.

== Hiatus ==
Dead or American embarked upon a hiatus of undisclosed length in early 2009.

== Band members ==
Current

- Richard Carlin – drums, vocals
- Pete Flett – bass
- Chris Cusack – guitar, vocals
- Colin Morrison – guitar, vocals

Past

- Greg Heuer – bass
- Richard Bruce – bass
- Tom Farrington – bass
- Peter McCulloch – bass
