= The Loser (album) =

Studio album by Gospel
- Released: May 13, 2022
- Recorded: 2021
- Studio: God City Studio, Salem, Massachusetts
- Genre: Post-hardcore, progressive rock
- Length: 40:29
- Label: Dog Knights (DK-163)
- Producer: Kurt Ballou

Gospel chronology
The Moon Is a Dead World (2005)	The Loser (2022)	MVDM: The Magical Volumes Vol.1: The Magick Volume of Dark Madder (2022)

Professional ratings
Review scores
Source	Rating
Pitchfork	7.6/10
Sputnikmusic	3.8/5
Treblezine	(positive)

The Loser is the second studio album by the American hardcore punk band Gospel, released on May 13, 2022.

Upon its release, The Loser received positive reviews.

== Track listing ==
All tracks are written by Gospel

No.	Title	Length
1.	"Bravo"	4:36
2.	"Deerghost"	3:24
3.	"Hyper"	6:04
4.	"S.R.O."	6:00
5.	"Tango"	5:34
6.	"White Spaces"	3:17
7.	"Metallic Olives"	6:13
8.	"Warm Bed"	5:17
Total length:		40:29

== Personnel ==
Personnel per liner notes.

Gospel

- Adam Edward Dooling – vocals/guitar
- Sean Edward Miller – bass guitar
- Vincent Walter Roseboom – drums
- Johnathan Andrew Pastir – keyboards/guitar

Production

- Kurt Ballou – producer, recording
- Magnus Lindeberg – mastering
