= Unfortunately, We're Not Robots =

Studio album by Curl Up and Die
- Released: 2002
- Recorded: God City Studio
- Genre: Metallic hardcore
- Length: 35:41
- Label: Revelation Records
- Producer: Kurt Ballou

Curl Up and Die chronology
..	Unfortunately, We're Not Robots (2002)	The One Above All, the End of All That Is (2005)

Professional ratings
Review scores
Source	Rating
AllMusic	4/5 stars
Drowned in Sound	8/10

Unfortunately, We're Not Robots is the first album by the hardcore band Curl Up and Die, released in 2002.

== Critical reception ==
CMJ New Music Monthly called the album "loaded with sandpaper riffs, razorblade-gargling vocals and dementia-inducing rhythms." Exclaim! called it "a seamless perfection of abrasive metallic hardcore, the occasional droning otherworldly-influenced noisescape, electronic expulsion or melodic segue, bizarre guitar noise and unorthodox noisecore hostility mixed with simply terrifying vocals and intensely personal and poetic lyrics."

== Track listing ==
1. "We" - 0:05
2. "Are" – 0:05
3. "All" – 0:05
4. "Dead" – 0:06
5. "100 M.P.H. Vomit Dedicated To Jon" – 0:24
6. "On The Run From Johnny Law Ain't No Trip To Cleveland" – 1:14
7. "Ted Nugent Goes AOL" – 2:31
8. "Total Pandemonium" – 2:28
9. "Doctor Doom. A Man of Science, Doesn't Believe in Jesus, Why the Fuck Do You" – 2:39
10. "You'd Be Cuter if I Shot You in the Face" – 8:10
11. "Make Like a Computer and Get with the Program" – 4:56
12. "Your Idea of Fascism and Global Intervention Makes Me Puke" 2:37
13. "I Lost My Job to a Machine" 1:20
14. "Kissing You Is like Licking an Ashtray" 2:02
15. "Rich Hall (Runner Up in a Carson Daly Lookalike Contest)" 7:05

== Personnel ==
- Jesse Fitts - Drums
- Matt Fuchs - Guitar
- Ryan Hartery - Bass
- Mike Minnick - Vocals
