= Gospel (band) =

American hardcore punk band

- Gospel in 2022

Background information
- Origin: Brooklyn, New York City, U.S.
- Genres: Screamo; progressive rock; grindcore; post-hardcore; hardcore punk
- Years active: 2003–2006; 2009–2010; 2018–present
- Labels: Fuck It Tapes; Level Plane; Dog Knights
- Members: Adam Dooling; Sean Miller; Vincent Roseboom; Johnathan Pastir
- Website: gospel.bandcamp.com
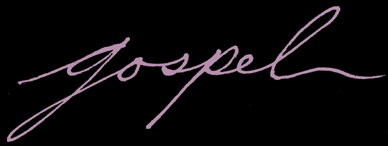

Gospel is an American hardcore punk band. The band was formed in 2003 in Brooklyn, New York by guitarist/vocalist Adam Dooling, bassist Sean Miller and drummer Vincent Roseboom, with keyboardist/guitarist Johnathan Pastir joining the band in 2004.

Gospel's debut album, The Moon Is a Dead World, was released in 2005 to positive reviews, though the band later broke up in late 2006 due to conflicts over the band's creative direction. The band reformed briefly in 2009 and attempted to work on new material, but disbanded again a year later. In 2018, the band reformed for a third time, and have since released a new studio album, The Loser, in 2022.

Gospel have received notability and acclaim for their unique fusion of progressive rock and hardcore music.The Moon Is a Dead World has been seen as one of the greatest screamo albums of all time by multiple sources.

== History ==
=== Formation (2003–2004) ===
"I don't remember [how the band name came about] exactly! But I think I wanted a simple name that would confuse or incite people. We are not religious people, we are the opposite. I went to Catholic school as a child and it made me want to rebel against religion and authority. Taking the name Gospel meant subverting something deemed sacred by society. It is also a simple name people will remember. If the definition of Gospel is "a set of principles and beliefs", then we want to question those principles and beliefs. We want to turn them on their head. We are a punk band after all!"

— Adam Dooling on the origin of the band's name.

Gospel was formed in Brooklyn, in 2003 by Adam Dooling, Sean Miller and Vincent Roseboom, who had previously lived together on Long Island. The three members had been originally playing together in a late 1990s hardcore punk/screamo band called Helen of Troy. Compared to Helen of Troy's material, the band's song writing was more expansive, expanding beyond hardcore music and into progressive music. To help execute the stylistic changes in the band, Johnathan Pastir (also from Long Island) was added to the line-up in 2004 to play keyboards; Pastir had to learn how to play keyboards from scratch.

=== The Moon Is a Dead World and breakup (2004–2006) ===
Gospel recorded their debut album, The Moon Is a Dead World (named after a plaque found in the American Museum of Natural History in New York City), with Kurt Ballou in March 2005, and the album was released in May 2005 on Level Plane Records, the record label owned by Saetia's Greg Drudy. Upon its release, the album received positive reviews; the album has since been seen as a defining release in the screamo genre. Gospel toured heavily around the East Coast of the United States alongside Meneguar in support of the album, creating a buzz for the band within Level Plane and the music industry. The band gained notoriety for their violent and dramatic live shows; most notably, they were banned from The Owl Music Parlour after a large fire broke out following a performance. Gospel embarked on a successful tour with Converge in late 2006, which increased the band's mainstream exposure.

After the tour with Converge ended, the band attempted to record several projects, including a studio-recorded version of "The Magic Volume of Dark Matter", a 23-minute long song which they were writing (and had been played live once) in 2006, but none of these projects materialised. Owing to exhaustion, conflicts and infighting between the band members as well as disputes over the band's musical direction, Gospel announced their breakup in late 2006, but did not disclose the reason why at the time. As summarized by Johnathan Pastir, "The unwavering visions everyone had for the band really destroyed the band".

=== Brief reunion (2009–2010) ===
In 2009, it was announced that Gospel had reunited. The band had written an album's worth of material, and originally planned on quietly releasing the album. However, the band changed plans and performed a benefit show for Matty "No Times" Messina, a tattoo artist and former Gospel roadie, who was in need of financial support to cover the medical costs of a liver transplant, on January 29, 2010. The band revealed they were no longer signed to Level Plane, and that they were planning to release new music in March 2010. The band released LIVIDII, a compilation of live performances of songs from 2004 to 2006, at the show. Another benefit show was played on April 24, 2010.

The band released a new single, "Tango", on June 14, 2010. They attempted to work on an extended play, though this was never completed and the band split again, as, according to Adam Dooling, "We still weren't ready yet".

=== Second reunion, The Loser and MVDM (2018–present) ===
Gospel decided to reunite in 2018 after reconnecting with each other again at the wedding of Matty "No Times" Messina in New York, and with some encouragement from Roseboom's father. They initially planned to finish "The Magic Volume of Dark Matter", but instead ended up writing new material.

In January 2019, The Moon Is a Dead World was remastered by Josh Bonati and reissued on double vinyl, along with updated artwork, by Repeater Records. Later that August, Gospel announced they would be reuniting for a one-off performance at the Saint Vitus Bar in Brooklyn in September, which sold out. The band played some highly anticipated new songs at the show.

In November 2021, Gospel announced their first album in 17 years, The Loser, having already released the single "S.R.O." in October 2021. The song was produced by Kurt Ballou and features him playing the saxophone. The Loser was given a release date of May 13, 2022.

The band performed a benefit show in Brooklyn on January 16, 2022, for Vincent Roseboom's daughter, Alina, who had been diagnosed with pediatric cancer.

On April 20, 2022, the band released another single for the album, "Deerghost". Upon its release, The Loser received positive reviews.

On July 11, 2022, Gospel finally released "The Magic Volume of Dark Matter" under the name MVDM: The Magical Volumes Vol.1: The Magick Volume of Dark Madder.

== Musical style and influences ==
Gospel has been described by critics as screamo, post-hardcore, progressive rock, grindcore, and hardcore punk. They have also been described as "prog-punk" and "progressive hardcore".

Adam Dooling described their music to Decibel as a combination of all of the member's influences and styles without any compromise; "If you were to give Vinny a nice suggestion about what to play, you’d be received with nothing but animosity. But we do have respect for each other. Everybody has a specific style that I don't think would work if we were playing with other musicians." The band members have listed The Beatles, Miles Davis, Nirvana, the 1970 Jesus Christ Superstar rock opera, Team Dresch, Metallica, Mahavishnu Orchestra, Joy Division, The Cure, Yanni, Silverchair, Racebannon, Envy, Jane's Addiction, the Minutemen and Primus as musical influences. The band are also fans of Peter Gabriel-era Genesis, with Roseboom calling them "the most underrated band ever", and the members have cited the band's 1974 album The Lamb Lies Down on Broadway as a musical influence.

The band rejected modern musical tropes of the time; "We’re bored with modern music. If you look through our CD collections, it's like looking through your parents’ collection. Basically, Gospel's sound is the result of four people living under a rock." Gospel also rejected scene culture, especially in the screamo genre they had come out of, with Dooling referring to it as "that sing-scream, white belt and stupid hair shit".

== Band members ==
- Adam Edward Dooling – vocals/guitar (2003–2006, 2009–2010, 2018–present)
- Sean Edward Miller – bass guitar (2003–2006, 2009–2010, 2018–present)
- Vincent Walter Roseboom – drums (2003–2006, 2009–2010, 2018–present)
- Johnathan Andrew Pastir – keyboards/guitar (2004–2006, 2009–2010, 2018–present)

== Discography ==
=== Studio albums ===
Year	Title	Details
2005	The Moon Is a Dead World	Released: May 10, 2005; Label: Level Plane (LP-83); Format: CD, LP, 2xLP, DD
2022	The Loser	Released: May 13, 2022; Label: Dog Knights (DK-163); Format: LP, DD

=== EPs ===
Year	Title	Details
2022	MVDM: The Magical Volumes Vol.1: The Magick Volume of Dark Madder	Released: July 11, 2022; Label: Dog Knights (DK-164); Format: LP, DD

=== Live albums ===
Year	Title	Details	Notes
2004	Lived	Released: 2004; Label: Fuck It Tapes (FIT002); Format: CS	Limited to 100 hand numbered copies. All songs but "Ghost N Gun" re-recorded on The Moon Is A Dead World
2010	LIVIDII	Released: January 29, 2010; Label: self-released; Format: CS	Limited to 50 copies. Handed out at benefit show on January 29, 2010.

=== Split releases ===
Year	Title	Details	Notes
2004	A Split 10" (with Kodan Armada)	Released: 2004; Label: Neon Boombox/The Support Group (vinyl) (BBOX-02/TSG 05), Cosmonaut Records (CD) (CRCD 005); Formats: 10" vinyl, CD	"Congratulations: You've Hit Bottom!" re-recorded on The Moon Is a Dead World

=== Singles ===
Title	Year	Album
"Tango"	2010	The Loser
"S.R.O."	2021	The Loser
"Deerghost"	2022	The Loser
