= Rheia (album) =

Studio album by Oathbreaker
- Released: September 30, 2016
- Recorded: April 2016
- Studios: Atomic Garden Studio (East Palo Alto, California)
- Genres: Black metal; blackgaze; screamo
- Length: 63:22
- Label: Deathwish
- Producers: Jack Shirley, Oathbreaker

Oathbreaker chronology
Eros|Anteros (2013)	Rheia (2016)

Rheia is the third studio album by Belgian metal band Oathbreaker. The album was produced by Jack Shirley and released through independent record label Deathwish Inc. on September 30, 2016. Oathbreaker toured internationally in support of Rheia from September until December with Skeletonwitch and Iron Reagan. The title references Rhea, mother goddess in Greek mythology.

== Background ==
Following 2013's Eros/Anteros, the band's first release to feature clean vocals, Oathbreaker decided to continue the mix of clean and harsh vocals on their next album, making sure to "not sound like a Nightwish cover band." Rheia was recorded in San Francisco with producer Jack Shirley, who was known for his work with bands like Deafheaven and Loma Prieta. The band also wanted the album to sound less dark and aggressive than its predecessor. "Stay Here/Accroche-Moi" was the final song to be recorded.

Lead vocalist Caro Tanghe said that her lyrics for Rheia were the most direct that she had written, which was inspired by her boyfriend and bandmate Gilles Demolder encouraging her to open up more. Both Tanghe and Demolder stated that singer-songwriter Mark Kozelek was the main influence on Rheia's lyrics, which tackle subjects ranging from the death of Tanghe's grandmother to her strained personal relationships with her estranged parents. The lyrics of "10:56" are about Tanghe walking her father home as a child while he was drunk with a broken nose. "Where I Live" and "Where I Leave" were written about Tanghe leaving her birthplace of Blankenberge.

The album's cover art depicts Tanghe and Demolder's hands joined together with burning candle wax as it reacts to cold water.

== Reception ==
Professional ratings
Aggregate scores
Source	Rating
Metacritic	76/100
Review scores
Source	Rating
Exclaim!	8/10
Pitchfork	7.8/10
PopMatters	6/10
Sputnikmusic	3.8/5

Rheia was well received by music critics upon release. At Metacritic, which assigns a normalized rating out of 100 to reviews from mainstream publications, the album received an average score of 76, based on five reviews, indicating "generally favorable reviews". Exclaim!'s Natalie Zina Walschots thought that the band has released "a vast and complex record that doesn't just react toward but actively embraces the aesthetics of doom and sludge." Andy O'Conor of Pitchfork said of the album: "While still fairly beholden to black metal, Rheia shares a core ideal with Cobalt's Slow Forever and Deafheaven's New Bermuda: They broke out of black metal's stylistic confines, using it as a launching pad more than a set of totalitarian marching orders, and in the process became emotive, powerful metal albums." PopMatters critic Chris Conaton described the record as "wonderful in terms of contrasting black metal fury with quieter moments," but thought that the songwriting lags behind the atmosphere." Sputnikmusic staff critic Tristan Jones described the album as "a swan song," writing that the record "demonstrates the band's evident progress instrumentally and vocally and [Jack] Shirley's influence takes them to new heights, and chasmic lows."

=== Accolades ===
Publication	Country	Accolade	Rank
Treble	US	The Top 50 Albums of 2016	50
Consequence of Sound	US	The Top 10 Metal Albums of 2016	9
Terrorizer	UK	Albums Of The Year 2016	3
Noisey	US	The 100 Best Albums of 2016	20

== Track listing ==
All music and lyrics written by Oathbreaker.

No.	Title	Length
1.	"10:56"	2:11
2.	"Second Son of R."	5:55
3.	"Being Able to Feel Nothing"	7:08
4.	"Stay Here / Accroche-Moi"	5:12
5.	"Needles in Your Skin"	7:14
6.	"Immortals"	8:52
7.	"I'm Sorry, This Is"	4:14
8.	"Where I Live"	7:01
9.	"Where I Leave"	8:52
10.	"Begeerte"	6:43

== Personnel ==
Rheia personnel adapted from CD liner notes.

=== Oathbreaker ===
- Lennart Bossu - Guitars
- Ivo Debrabandere - Drums
- Gilles Demolder - Guitars, Bass
- Caro Tanghe - Vocals

=== Additional musicians ===
- Wim Coppers – drums on "Second Son of R.," "Being Able to Feel Nothing," "Needles in Your Skin" and "Where I Live"
- Treha Sektori – electronic arrangements on "I'm Sorry, This Is," "Where I Live" and "Where I Leave"

=== Production ===
- Jack Shirley – recording, producing, engineering, mixing and mastering
- Oathbreaker – production

=== Artwork ===
- Hemel – art direction
- Jeroen Mylle – photography
- We Became Aware – layout, design

== Charts ==
Chart (2016)	Peak position
Belgian Albums (Ultratop Flanders)	104
