= Death Knows Your Name =

Studio album by The Hope Conspiracy
- Released: September 19, 2006
- Recorded: February 2005–February 2006; God City Studios. Salem, Massachusetts, USA
- Genre: Hardcore punk
- Length: 35:18
- Label: Deathwish (DWI52)
- Producer: Kurt Ballou

The Hope Conspiracy chronology
Hang Your Cross (2006)	Death Knows Your Name (2006)	True Nihilist (2009)

Professional ratings
Review scores
Source	Rating
Allmusic	4.5/5 stars
Alt Press	4/5 stars
Interpunk	(positive)
Lambgoat	4/5 stars

Death Knows Your Name is the third full-length album from hardcore punk band The Hope Conspiracy. It was released September 19, 2006 through Deathwish Inc.

In January 2022, Deathwish will release a remastered reissue of Death Knows Your Name with updated artwork and the bonus track "Eurohell" from the band's out-of-print 2006 EP, Hang Your Cross.

== Track listing ==
No.	Title	Length
1.	"They Know Not"	3:35
2.	"Deadtown Nothing"	2:16
3.	"A Darkness In The Light"	2:01
4.	"Animal Farm"	3:40
5.	"Curse Of The Oil Snakes"	2:21
6.	"Hang Your Cross"	2:28
7.	"Suicide Design"	3:22
8.	"Leech Bloody Leech"	1:34
9.	"So Many Pigs So Few Bullets"	2:36
10.	"Sadistic Sacred Whore"	5:59
11.	"Stolen Days"	5:26
