= The Moon Is a Dead World =

Studio album by Gospel
- Released: May 10, 2005
- Recorded: March 2005
- Studio: God City Studio, Salem, Massachusetts
- Genre: Screamo; post-hardcore; progressive rock; hardcore punk
- Length: 39:05
- Label: Level Plane (LP-83)
- Producer: Kurt Ballou

Gospel chronology
The Moon Is a Dead World (2005)	The Loser (2022)

The Moon Is a Dead World is the debut studio album by American hardcore punk band Gospel. It was released on May 10, 2005, by Level Plane Records. It was the band's only studio album during their initial existence.

Upon its release, the album received positive reviews; the album has since been seen as a defining release in the screamo genre.

== Recording and production ==
Gospel entered God City Studio with Kurt Ballou in early March 2005. While Ballou already had a set up drum kit in the studio, Roseboom wanted to use his own, so time was spent adjusting his drumkit. The band enjoyed working with Kurt Ballou; despite the fact that Gospel's sound was a departure from his usual hardcore material and the fact the band had one week to record the album, Ballou adjusted well and did not pressure the band during the recording process. "He captured the essence of the music very well, in a short period of time, and made it as painless as possible", Johnathan Pastir recalled.

As most of the songs were already completed by the time he joined the band, Johnathan Pastir only contributes to the songwriting on "Golden Dawn".

== Composition ==
The Moon Is a Dead World has been classed as screamo, post-hardcore, progressive rock, grindcore and hardcore punk. The band received comparisons to Genesis, King Crimson, Hawkwind, Glassjaw and Sonic Youth. Pitchfork described the album's riffs as "King Crimson via Converge".

=== Album title ===
The album title was taken from a plaque describing the moon at the American Museum of Natural History in New York City. "When reading the plaque describing the moon, the first sentence reads, “the moon is a dead world,” and we just kept it in mind.", Johnathan Pastir recalled. "We used it for the best reason possible: it sounds cool. In hindsight, I personally think it fits the atmosphere of the record really well." Adam Dooling supported this; "I like how at first glance it reads as a macabre statement, but under closer examination it’s nothing more than an objective assertion."

== Release and touring ==
The Moon Is a Dead World was released on May 10, 2005, by Level Plane Records on CD and vinyl. The first vinyl press was limited to 200 copies on red with white splatters.

=== Touring ===
To support the record, Gospel toured throughout the East Coast of the US with Menuwar and Converge, creating a buzz for the band within Level Plane and the music industry. During the tour the band became a notorious live act, getting into fights and destroying instruments. An infamous event was at The Owl Music Parlour, where a fire broke out after a drunk fan threw a Christmas tree on a fire created by John Pastir after the show. Overall, the tour was a success for the band, however, they took the praise they were receiving with a grain of salt.

=== 2019 remaster ===
In October 2018, it was announced that The Moon Is a Dead World would be getting a reissue on double vinyl. It was remastered by Josh Bonati, and released through Repeater Records on January 11, 2019.

== Reception ==
Professional ratings
Review scores
Source	Rating
Allmusic	3.5/5 stars
Pitchfork	7.8/10

Upon its initial release, The Moon Is a Dead World received positive reviews from critics.

=== Accolades ===
Publication	Country	Accolade	Year	Rank
Treble	United States	10 Essential Screamo Albums	2014	*

* denotes an unordered list

== Track listing ==
All tracks are written by Adam Dooling, Sean Miller and Vincent Roseboom, except where noted.

Side A
No.	Title	Music	Length
1.	"Congratulations...You've Hit Bottom!"		3:41
2.	"Yr Electric Surge Is Sweet"		4:14
3.	"A Golden Dawn"	Dooling, Miller, Roseboom, Johnathan Pastir	9:04

Side B
No.	Title	Length
4.	"Paper Tigon"	3:23
5.	"And Redemption Fills the Emptiest of Hearts"	2:45
6.	"Opium"	3:56
7.	"What Means of Witchery"	6:18
8.	"As Far as You Can Throw Me"	5:40
Total length:		39:05

== Personnel ==
Credits adapted from liner notes and Bandcamp.

Gospel
- Adam Dooling – vocals/guitar
- Sean Miller – bass guitar
- Vincent Roseboom – drums
- Johnathan Pastir – keyboards/guitar

Production

- Kurt Ballou – producer, engineer, recording
Artwork
- Alec Horihan – cover art
- Dima Drjuchin – design
- Gospel – design

Remaster

- Josh Bonati – remastering
