= Sleepwell Deconstructor =

Studio album by Trap Them
- Released: April 3, 2007
- Recorded: 2006
- Genres: Grindcore, crust punk
- Length: 21: 27
- Label: Trash Art!
- Producer: Kurt Ballou

Trap Them chronology
| Sleepwell Deconstructor (2007) | Séance Prime (2007) |

Sleepwell Deconstructor is the first album by Trap Them, released on April 3, 2007 on Trash Art!. Like the last recorded output from core members Ryan McKenney and Brian Izzi, Backstabbers Inc's Kamikaze Missions (2003), Sleepwell Deconstructor is produced by Kurt Ballou. Illustration and design by Justin Bartlett.

== Track listing ==
| No. | Title | Length |
|---|---|---|
| 1. | "Day One: Insomniawesome" | 1:08 |
| 2. | "Day Two: They Followed the Scent of Jihad All the Way to the Thieves Paradise (We Will Bring Our Riot to the Courtyard of the Cunt Heir to the Throne)" | 2:57 |
| 3. | "Day Three: Instant Circulation" | 0:44 |
| 4. | "Day Four: Collapse and Marathon" | 1:19 |
| 5. | "Day Five: Garlic Breakfast" | 1:30 |
| 6. | "Day Six: Fucked as Punk" | 2:05 |
| 7. | "Day Seven: Digital Dogs with Analog Collars" | 1:55 |
| 8. | "Day Eight: Destructioneer Extraordinaire" | 4:58 |
| 9. | "Day Nine: Hollow Factory" | 1:07 |
| 10. | "Day Ten: Swine into Silk" | 1:03 |
| 11. | "Day Eleven: Threatnurse" | 1:04 |
| 12. | "Day Twelve: All Hands on the Medic" | 1:37 |

== Reception ==
Professional ratings
Review scores
| Source | Rating |
|---|---|
| AllMusic | link |
| Blabbermouth | link |
| Decibel | link |
| Exclaim! Magazine | not rated link |
| Hellride Music | Highly Recommended link |
| Lambgoat | link |
| Outburn | 10/10 stars |
| Punknews.org | link |
| Rise And Revolt | link |
| Scene Point Blank | link |
| Terrorizer | 9/10 stars |

Sleepwell Deconstructor has received mainly positive reviews, from many critics. Exclaim! magazine called the band "one of the fiercest, ugliest, most threatening malcontents around". Decibel talked about the mix of styles on the album and were not quite sure what to make of it (though they did give a positive review). Despite some minor criticisms, Sleepwell Deconstructor was well-received for a debut album released on a small label with less reach than other indies. The album was also rated as one of Decibel's top 40 releases of 2007.

== Music ==
=== Production ===
Sleepwell Deconstructor was produced by Trap Them and Kurt Ballou, Ballou also appears as a vocalist and guitarist on several songs.
