= Once Love Was Lost =

Studio album by Vorvaň
- Released: October 14, 2016
- Recorded: 2015 at Pentagram House Studio, The Atomic Garden Recording Studio, Ddf Studios
- Genre: Hardcore punk, crust punk, post-hardcore, black metal
- Length: 50:54
- Label: Darkened Days Records, Wooaaargh (DDR-LP-001, WRG099)
- Producer: Vorvaň, Kurt Ballou

Professional ratings
Review scores
Source	Rating
Doomed to Darkness Zine	8/10 stars
Kvlt	9.5/10 stars
Legacy Magazine	(11/15)
Metal Hammer	7/10 stars
Metalnews	(97/100)
Metal Trenches	(8.7/10)
Ox Fanzine	9/10 stars
Rock N Reel	4/5 stars
Toilet ov Hell	4/5 stars

Once Love Was Lost is the first full length studio album by Russian hardcore/metal band Vorvaň. The album was released on October 14, 2016 through German labels Wooaaargh and Darkened Days Records.

== Background ==
After the release of two EPs and a split Vorvaň started to work on the material for a full-length album. It took more than a year to finish recording, the band wanted to make “Once Love Was Lost” sound differently and stand up to the works of the bands that had influenced Vorvaň.

== Recording ==
The album was recorded at Pentagram House, studio run by the band members. Famous sound producer Kurt Ballou mixed the record at Godcity Studio, Brad Boatright mastered it. Double LP edition includes a bonus cover on the song Struck a Nerve originally performed by Machine Head and includes a 32-page booklet with illustrations and lyrics.

== Track listing ==
All music composed and produced by Vorvaň, all lyrics written by Eli Mavrychev

No.	Title	Length
1.	"Of Menace and Favour"	5:17
2.	"Sirens"	2:19
3.	"Third Case Scenario"	5:31
4.	"Last to Witness"	4:06
5.	"Celestine"	10:03
6.	"Breothan"	4:58
7.	"Turned Away"	3:15
8.	"The Black Kaleidoscope"	4:05
9.	"When Serpent Strikes First"	3:04
10.	"The End (Hemicrania)"	8:16

Vinyl edition bonus track
No.	Title	Length
11.	"Struck a Nerve" (Machine Head cover)	3:36

== Personnel ==
Album personnel and recording history as listed in LP liner notes.

=== Vorvaň ===
- Eli Mavrychev – lead vocals, backing vocals, guitars
- Eugene Cherevkov – guitars
- Igor Butz – bass
- Zakk Hemma – drums, backing vocals

=== Guest musicians ===
- Meghan O'Neil Pennie (Punch, Super Unison) – vocals on "Sirens"
- Armin Schweiger (Afgrund, Distaste) – vocals on "The Black Kaleidoscope"

=== Art and design ===
- Hal Rotter – artwork
- Eli Mavrychev – concept, design, layout
- Eva Ivanova – photography

=== Production and recording ===
- Vorvaň – production
- Igor Butz – engineering at Pentagram House Studio
- Kurt Ballou – mixing at Godcity Studios
- Brad Boatright – mastering at Audiosiege
- Jack Shirley – additional recording at The Atomic Garden Recording Studio
- Lukas Haidinger – additional recording at Ddf Studios
- Timur Mukhametzyanov – additional engineering
