= Vorvaň =

Russian hardcore band

- Also known as: Vorvan
- Origin: Moscow, Russia
- Genres: Hardcore punk, crust punk, sludge metal
- Years active: 2009–present
- Labels: Wooaaargh, Darkened Days
- Members: Eugene Cherevkov; Igor Butz; Eli Mavrychev; Maxim Prokofyev
- Past members: Aleksandr Fursov; Alexey Merganov; Zakk Hemma; Egor Mikhailov
- Website: vorvan.bandcamp.com

Vorvaň is a Russian hardcore punk/metal band originally from Moscow, formed in 2009. They are known for mixing different styles of extreme music, continuously experimenting with compositions, melodics and sound.

== History ==
Vorvaň was formed by guitarist Eugene Cherevkov who had left his previous band Tombstone Piledriver and started the new project in 2009 in Moscow with an idea of playing fast mix of metal and punk. After a long process of trying different musicians Eugene's old mate Igor Butz joined him as a bassist in early 2011. Later that year drummer Aleksandr Fursov and vocalist Eli Mavrychev completed the band's line up. In February 2012 Vorvaň released their debut EP "Sailing the Vastness of Oceans" via Gorgona Records limited to only 500 CD copies. As expected, it was influenced by Converge, Disfear and Mastodon.

After the "Sailing the Vastness of Oceans" release Aleksandr left the band and new drummer Alexey Merganov joined Vorvaň. Fresh line up went on in November 2012.

During 2013 Vorvaň were actively playing local shows, sharing stage with such bands as Napalm Death, Extreme Noise Terror. In October the band released a digital EP In Gloom consisting of four new songs where they presented a much more aggressive and solid sound. Their music became even more experimental and chaotic. The following year Vorvaň opened their new recording studio, and went on their first headlining European tour.

Whole 2015 was spent on new material and experiments with recording and finally Vorvaň finished working on their first longplay album Once Love Was Lost which was mixed and mastered by American producers Kurt Ballou (Converge) and Brad Boatright (From Ashes Rise). In September 2016 Vorvaň premiered the new song "The Black Kaleidoscope" featuring guest vocals of Armin Schweiger (Afgrund/Distaste) and quickly followed with their new official music video release on the song "When Serpent Strikes First". On 5 October, new song "Sirens" became exclusively available for digital streaming that made the upcoming album highly anticipated worldwide. This song features guest appearance of Meghan O'Neil known as a vocalist for San Francisco-based Punch and Super Unison.

Once Love Was Lost was officially released via German labels Wooaaargh and Darkened Days Records on double coloured vinyls. This press includes a 32-page booklet with the artwork done by Rotting Graphics and exclusively features Vorvaň's cover on the song "Struck a Nerve" originally performed by Machine Head. By the end of year the band went on short Russian tour. In an interview with Metal Hammer, vocalist Eli Mavrychev has revealed Vorvaň's plans to tour Europe and the UK in 2017.

== Members ==
=== Current ===
- Eugene Cherevkov – guitar (2009–present)
- Igor Butz – bass (2011–present)
- Eli Mavrychev – vocals, guitar, lyrics (2011–present)
- Maxim Prokofyev – drums (2018–present)

=== Former ===
- Aleksandr Fursov – drums (2011–2012)
- Alexey Merganov – drums (2012–2014)
- Zakk Hemma – drums (2014–2017)
- Egor Mikhailov – drums (2017–2018)

== Discography ==
Studio albums

- Once Love Was Lost (2016 Darkened Days Records / Wooaaargh / Enrage Records)
- Awakened (2021 Darkened Days Records / Sludgelord Records / Black Voodoo Records / Enrage Records)

Extended Plays

- Sailing the Vastness of Oceans (2012 Gorgona Records)
- In Gloom (2013 Self-Released)

Splits

- Split with The Chains (2012 Unlock Yourself Records / Opposing Music)

== Music videos ==
- Isolation (2013)
- Alco Side (2013)
- When Serpent Strikes First (2016)
