= Midnight in America =

Studio album by Modern Life Is War
- Released: 2007
- Genre: Hardcore punk, melodic hardcore
- Length: 30:02
- Label: Equal Vision
- Producer: J. Robbins

Modern Life Is War chronology
Witness (2005)	Midnight in America (2007)	Fever Hunting (2013)

Midnight in America is the third full-length studio album by American hardcore punk band Modern Life is War. The album was produced by J. Robbins.

== Track listing ==
All tracks by Modern Life Is War

1. "Useless Generation" - 3:14
2. "Screaming at the Moon" - 2:24
3. "Stagger Lee" - 4:08
4. "Big City Dream" - 3:10
5. "Fuck The Sex Pistols" - 1:04
6. "Pendulum" - 1:39
7. "These Mad Dogs of Glory" - 3:36
8. "Night Shift At The Potato Factory" - 2:17
9. "The Motorcycle Boy Reigns" - 2:14
10. "Humble Streets" - 2:52
11. "Midnight in America" - 3:24

== Personnel ==
- Alan Douches – Mastering
- Jeffrey Eaton – Vocals
- John Eich – Guitar, Vocals
- Tyler Oleson – Drums
- Tim Churchman - Bass, Vocals
- Sjarm 13 - Guitar
- James Robbins – Producer, Engineer, Mixing

== Critical reception ==
Professional ratings
Review scores
Source	Rating
Allmusic	link
Stylus Magazine	A-
