= Blissfucker =

Studio album by Trap Them
- Released: June 10, 2014
- Genre: Grindcore, crust punk
- Length: 46:41
- Label: Prosthetic PROS101721
- Producer: Kurt Ballou

Trap Them chronology
Darker Handcraft (2011)	Blissfucker (2014)	Crown Feral (2016)

Professional ratings
Aggregate scores
Source	Rating
Metacritic	81/100
Review scores
Source	Rating
Pitchfork	7.3/10 stars
PunkNews	4/5 stars
Revolver	4/5 stars

Blissfucker is the fourth studio album by the American grindcore/crust punk band Trap Them. It was released on June 10, 2014. It is the first album to feature their new bassist, Galen Baudhuin (Infera Bruo), and drummer Brad Fickeisen (No Salvation, ex-The Red Chord). Like their 2011 release, Darker Handcraft, it was released on Prosthetic Records. At 5:30 of the track "Let Fall Each and Every Sedition Symptom," is a hidden track, a re-recording of "Insomniawesome," from their first album, Sleepwell Deconstructor.

== Track listing ==
No.	Title	Length
1.	"Salted Crypts"	4:15
2.	"Habitland"	2:22
3.	"Gift and Gift Unsteady"	3:12
4.	"Lungrunners"	4:04
5.	"Organic Infernal"	3:47
6.	"Sanitations"	3:49
7.	"Bad Nones"	3:05
8.	"Former Lining Wide The Walls"	3:25
9.	"Savage Climbers"	7:41
10.	"Ransom Risen"	4:25
11.	"Let Fall Each and Every Sedition Symptom"	6:36

== Personnel ==
Trap Them

- Brian Izzi – guitar
- Galen Baudhuin – bass
- Brad Fickeisen – drums
- Ryan McKenney – vocals
