= Crown Feral =

Studio album by Trap Them
- Released: September 23, 2016
- Genre: Grindcore, crust punk
- Length: 31:31
- Label: Prosthetic PROS102562
- Producer: Kurt Ballou

Trap Them chronology
Blissfucker (2014)	Crown Feral (2016)

Professional ratings
Review scores
Source	Rating
Decibel	Positive
Metal Injection	9/10 stars
Rock Sound	7/10 stars
Ultimate Guitar	8.2/10 stars

Crown Feral is the fifth and final studio album by the American grindcore band Trap Them. It was released in 2016 through Prosthetic Records.

== Track listing ==
No.	Title	Length
1.	"Kindred Dirt"	2:01
2.	"Hellionaires"	3:30
3.	"Prodigala"	3:33
4.	"Luster Pendulums"	2:40
5.	"Malengines Here, Where They Should Be"	3:32
6.	"Speak Nigh"	3:06
7.	"Twitching in the Auras"	3:31
8.	"Revival Spines"	3:32
9.	"Stray of the Tongue"	2:02
10.	"Phantom Air"	4:07

== Personnel ==
Trap Them

- Brian Izzi – guitar
- Galen Baudhuin – bass
- Brad Fickeisen – drums
- Ryan McKenney – vocals
