= Filth Rations =

EP by Trap Them
- Released: June 1, 2010
- Genre: Crust punk
- Length: 13:57
- Label: Southern Lord (115)
- Producer: Kurt Ballou

Trap Them chronology
Seizures in Barren Praise (2008)	Filth Rations (2010)	Darker Handcraft (2011)

Filth Rations is an extended play by the American grindcore band Trap Them. It was released on June 1, 2010, through Southern Lord Records. Filth Rations was described by Blow the Scene as "a tasty appetizer" for the group's follow-up release, Darker Handcraft. Jason Heller of The A.V. Club added the EP to his best of 2010 list.

== Track listing ==
1. "Day 38: Carnage Incarnate" – 3:27
2. "Day 39: Degenerate Binds" – 3:31
3. "Day 40: Dead Fathers Wading In the Bodygrounds" – 5:10
4. "Day 7: Digital Dogs with Analog Collars" – 1:49

== Personnel ==
Trap Them

- Brian Izzi – guitar
- Stephen LaCour – bass guitar
- Chris Maggio – drum kit
- Ryan McKenney – vocals
