= Séance Prime =

EP by Trap Them
- Released: October 30, 2007
- Recorded: 2007
- Genre: Grindcore, crust punk
- Length: 11:21 (7" version)
- Label: Deathwish (DWI66)
- Producer: Kurt Ballou

Trap Them chronology
Sleepwell Deconstructor (2007)	Séance Prime (2007)	Seizures in Barren Praise (2008)

Professional ratings
Review scores
Source	Rating
Decibel	8/10 stars
DecoyMusic	4/5 stars
Exclaim!	(favorable)
Hellride Music	(positive)
Lambgoat	7/10 stars
Scene Point Blank	9/10 stars

Séance Prime is Trap Them's Deathwish Inc. debut, released on October 30, 2007, making it their third release of the year. Like Sleepwell Deconstructor, Séance Prime was produced by Kurt Ballou at Godcity Studios. Described as "a tornado of D-Beat hooks, frantic bursts of speed, and earth shaking dirges" this album has been critically called their heaviest release to date.

In 2011, the EP was reissued as Séance Prime: The Complete Recordings featuring all six songs from this recording session, including: "The Iconflict", originally released as a CD exclusive track, and "Enders", originally released on a split single with Extreme Noise Terror.

== Track listings ==
Séance Prime (7")

1. "Day Thirteen: The Protest Hour" – 3:12
2. "Day Fourteen: Pulse Mavens" – 3:39
3. "Day Fifteen: Citizenihilist" – 2:50
4. "Day Seventeen: Wafer and Wine of Sandblast Times" – 1:40

Séance Prime (CD)

1. "Day Thirteen: The Protest Hour" – 3:12
2. "Day Fourteen: Pulse Mavens" – 3:39
3. "Day Fifteen: Citizenihilist" – 2:50
4. "Day Sixteen: The Iconflict" – 4:19
5. "Day Seventeen: Wafer and Wine of Sandblast Times" – 1:40

Séance Prime: The Complete Recordings (LP)

1. "Day Thirteen: The Protest Hour" – 3:12
2. "Day Fourteen: Pulse Mavens" – 3:39
3. "Day Fifteen: Citizenihilist" – 2:50
4. "Day Sixteen: The Iconflict" – 4:19
5. "Day Seventeen: Wafer and Wine of Sandblast Times" – 1:40
6. "Day Eighteen: Enders" – 0:58

== Reception ==
Séance Prime has gotten mainly positive reviews, from many critics. Lambgoat described it as "a small shift in songwriting style and a desire to get outside the grindcore box," but also said this change "sacrifices some of the intensity that was a key component to the band's sound." The EP was also praised as the band's heaviest to date and a continuation of their mixture of many different genres including d-beat, grindcore, hardcore punk and extreme metal.

== Production ==
Séance Prime was produced by Trap Them and Kurt Ballou.
