= Fever Hunting =

Studio album by Modern Life Is War
- Released: September 9, 2013
- Genres: Melodic hardcore, hardcore punk
- Length: 30:55
- Label: Deathwish (DW150)
- Producers: Kurt Ballou, Modern Life Is War

Modern Life Is War chronology
Midnight in America (2007)	Fever Hunting (2013)	Life On The Moon (2025)

Professional ratings
Aggregate scores
Source	Rating
Metacritic	81/100
Review scores
Source	Rating
Pitchfork	7.9/10.0
Revolver	3.5/5

Fever Hunting is the fourth studio album by American hardcore punk band Modern Life Is War. It was released on September 9, 2013 through Deathwish Inc., as the band's first release in six years since 2007's Midnight in America after reforming in 2012. The album features the band's original lineup and was produced by Kurt Ballou of Converge.

== Track listing ==
All songs composed by Modern Life Is War.

1. "Old Fears, New Frontiers" – 1:13
2. "Health, Wealth, & Peace" – 2:29
3. "Chasing My Tail" – 4:35
4. "Media Cunt" – 2:01
5. "Blind Are Breeding" – 3:50
6. "Fever Hunting" – 2:48
7. "Dark Water" – 2:16
8. "Brothers in Arms Forever" – 3:53
9. "Currency" – 3:19
10. "Cracked Sidewalk Surfer" – 1:55
11. "Find a Way" – 2:36

== Personnel ==
Modern Life Is War

- Jeffrey Eaton – vocals
- John Eich – guitar
- Matt Hoffman – guitar
- Chris Honeck – bass
- Tyler Oleson – drums

Additional musicians

- Kat Demarco – backing vocals
- Pete Marullo – backing vocals
- Rob Samps – backing vocals

Production and artwork

- Kurt Ballou – engineer, mixing, producer
- Jacob Bannon – artwork
- Brad Boatright – mastering
- Modern Life Is War – producer
