= My Love. My Way. =

Album by Modern Life Is War

Studio album by Modern Life Is War
- Released: 2003
- Genre: Hardcore punk
- Length: 24:00
- Label: Martyr; Deathwish (DWI55)

Modern Life Is War chronology
Modern Life Is War EP (2002)	My Love. My Way. (2003)	Witness (2005)

Professional ratings
Review scores
Source	Rating
Allmusic	link

My Love. My Way. is an album by Iowa hardcore quintet Modern Life is War. The album was originally released via Martyr Records; Deathwish Inc. now handles all Modern Life Is War reissues. The reissued and remastered version of My Love. My Way. contains two additional songs from the M.L.I.W. 7" E.P.

== Track listing ==
No.	Title	Length
1.	"Breaking the Cycle"	2:01
2.	"Late Bloomers"	2:21
3.	"Clarity"	1:57
4.	"War"	1:20
5.	"Self Preservation"	3:29
6.	"By the Sea"	3:39
7.	"Yesterday's Trash"	0:52
8.	"A Tale of Two Cities"	2:15
9.	"Momentum"	2:59
10.	"First and Ellen"	3:07

Re-release Bonus Tracks
No.	Title	Length
11.	"Destination: Death or Better Days"	2:28
12.	"Farmer's Holiday Association"	2:02

== Personnel ==
- Tyler - Drums
- Matt - Guitar
- Jeff - Vocals
- John - Guitar
- Chris - Bass

== Album information ==
- Recorded in March 2003 at Atomic Recording Company in Brooklyn, N.Y.
- Dean Baltulonis – Audio Engineering
- Bob Strakele – Audio Engineering
- Matt Henderson – Audio Engineering
- Bice - Assistant Engineering
- All songs written by Modern Life Is War
- Reissue remasted by Nick Zampiello at New Alliance
- House Photography - Christopher Cannon
- Original Design and Art Direction - Christopher Cannon and Jacob Bannon
