= Nothing Violates This Nature =

Studio album by All Pigs Must Die
- Released: 28 June 2013
- Recorded: 2013
- Studio: Godcity Studios
- Genre: Metalcore; grindcore; crust punk
- Length: 33:01
- Label: Southern Lord
- Producer: Kurt Ballou

All Pigs Must Die chronology
| God Is War (2011) | Nothing Violates This Nature (2013) |

Professional ratings
Aggregate scores
| Source | Rating |
|---|---|
| Metacritic | 82/100 |
Review scores
| Source | Rating |
| Allmusic | 4/5 stars |
| Consequence of Sound | 4/5 stars |
| Revolver (magazine) | 3.5/5 stars |
| Sputnik Music | 3.5/5 stars |

Nothing Violates This Nature is the second album by American metalcore supergroup All Pigs Must Die. The album was released on 28 June 2013 through Southern Lord Recordings, produced by Kurt Ballou and recorded at Godcity Studios in 2013.

== Track listing ==
| No. | Title | Length |
|---|---|---|
| 1. | "Chaos Arise" | 2:47 |
| 2. | "Silencer" | 1:55 |
| 3. | "Primitive Fear" | 4:21 |
| 4. | "Bloodlines" | 3:34 |
| 5. | "Of Suffering" | 5:30 |
| 6. | "Holy Plague" | 3:26 |
| 7. | "Aqim Siege" | 1:06 |
| 8. | "Sacred Nothing" | 1:59 |
| 9. | "Faith Eater" | 3:37 |
| 10. | "Articles of Human Weakness" | 4:47 |
| Total length: | | 32:55 |

== Personnel ==
All Pigs Must Die

- Kevin Baker – vocals
- Ben Koller – drums
- Adam Wentworth – guitar
- Matt Woods – bass

Additional personnel

- Kurt Ballou – engineering
- Brad Boatright – mastering
- Aaron Turner – artwork, design
