= Cold Blue =

Studio album by The Hope Conspiracy
- Released: October 24, 2000
- Genre: Hardcore punk
- Length: 22:11
- Label: Equal Vision Records
- Producer: Kurt Ballou

The Hope Conspiracy chronology
Cold Blue (2000)	File 03 (2001)

Professional ratings
Review scores
Source	Rating
AllMusic	2.5/5 stars
The Encyclopedia of Popular Music	3/5 stars

Cold Blue is the debut full-length album by the hardcore punk band the Hope Conspiracy, released in 2000.

== Critical reception ==
Exclaim! wrote: "Of course, the up-tempo hardcore-inflected riffs are present, as are the prerequisite breakdowns, thrash inspired metallic segments and tortured spoken/screamed vocals, but the Hope Conspiracy does manage a somewhat fresh take on it - the enthusiasm is tangible, the execution is flawless and the lyrics of singer Kevin Baker are more poetic than preaching."

== Track listing ==
No.	Title	Length
1.	"Fragile"	2:35
2.	"Bled Across the Wire"	2:37
3.	"Truth and Purpose"	1:48
4.	"Carved Out"	1:52
5.	"Hope Bound Heart"	2:06
6.	"Youth and Its Burden"	2:29
7.	"Divinity Sickness"	1:52
8.	"Consumed"	2:28
9.	"You've Been Warned"	2:16
10.	"Liars' Parade"	2:08
