= File 03 =

EP by The Hope Conspiracy
- Released: 2001
- Genre: Hardcore punk
- Length: 15:26
- Label: Bridge 9 Records

The Hope Conspiracy chronology
Cold Blue (2000)	File 03 (2001)	Endnote (2002)

File 03 is a 2001 EP from hardcore punk band The Hope Conspiracy.

== Track listing ==
1. "No Love Goes Unpunished"
2. "Treason"
3. "It Meant Nothing"
4. "Divinity Sickness"
5. "Regret Kills"
6. "Escapist"

== Sources ==
- File 03 On Yahoo! Music
