= Endnote (album) =

Studio album by The Hope Conspiracy
- Released: September 17, 2002
- Recorded: 2002
- Genre: Hardcore punk
- Length: 26:39
- Label: Equal Vision Records

The Hope Conspiracy chronology
File 03 (2001)	Endnote (2002)	Hang Your Cross (2006)

Professional ratings
Review scores
Source	Rating
Punknews	4.5/5

Endnote is the second full-length album by Boston hardcore band The Hope Conspiracy.

== Track listing ==
No.	Title	Length
1.	"Departed"	1:00
2.	"Defiant Hearts"	2:24
3.	"Holocaust"	2:59
4.	"Fallen"	2:27
5.	"Violent And Grey"	2:00
6.	"Just A Lie"	2:58
7.	"Distant"	1:28
8.	"Three Year Suicide"	2:06
9.	"Deadman"	1:07
10.	"Vendetta"	1:52
11.	"Fading Signal"	2:05
12.	"For Love"	4:05
