= Oathbreaker (band) =

Belgian metal band

- Origin: Ghent, East Flanders, Belgium
- Genres: Post-black metal; post-metal; metalcore; crust punk (early)
- Years active: 2008–2017, 2025–present
- Labels: Thirty Days of Night, Holy Shit!, Deathwish Inc.
- Spinoffs: Wiegedood; Predatory Void
- Members: Lennart Bossu; Gilles Demolder; Caro Tanghe; Wim Coppers
- Past members: Ivo Debrabandere

Oathbreaker is a Belgian metal band from Ghent, formed in 2008 and currently signed to Deathwish Inc. The band consists of guitarists Lennart Bossu and Gilles Demolder, drummer Wim Coppers, and vocalist Caro Tanghe who performs both screamed and sung vocals. They are a part of Church of Ra, an artistic collective started by Amenra, a band of which Lennart and Caro are also members. Like Amenra, Oathbreaker emerged from the Belgian underground hardcore punk scene but integrated extreme metal and art music aesthetics.

They have released three studio albums: Mælstrøm (2011), Eros|Anteros (2013) and Rheia (2016). The last two were generally well reviewed, on account of dark atmospheres, extremely intense sound, poetic lyrics, and raw emotion.

== History ==
=== Formation and early years ===
Gilles and Caro were childhood friends, meeting when Caro was aged 14. The duo eventually met Lennart Bossu, and formed a band which played in the Belgian hardcore scene, performing live with bands such as Rise and Fall. Over time, their style progressively changed, before parting ways with their drummer. In 2008, they had met Ivo Debrabandere, and evolved into what would become Oathbreaker, writing and releasing their debut EP in 2008. The band was named after a lyric in the song "The Eye of Every Storm" by Neurosis.

=== Debut album and first tours (2008–2012) ===
Over the course of the next two years, the band had begun to gradually write what would become their debut album, Mælstrøm, coming to rehearsal with small pieces and ideas for songs, combining them together. Before the release of the album, Lennart Bossu said in an interview, "It’s the only way we know how to write songs, even though there are faster ways I’m sure." In the Fall of 2010, the and had met with Michael Neyt, and Lander Cluyse, to engineer and record, and with Kurt Ballou to mix it. Lacking a singular recording location, the album had been recorded in a mix of several studios, and bedrooms. In July 2011, the album was released on Thirty Days To Nights Records, to small critical press, with above average to rave reviews. Most reviews had come to a general agreement that the band had a strong future. They then spent the latter half of 2011 into 2012 touring throughout Germany with Italian band Hierophant, as well as Northern and Eastern Europe with Rise and Fall, and The Secret. In 2012 they began their first US tour, on the east coast, before returning to Europe to begin work on their second album.

=== Eros/Anteros and Rheia (2013–2016) ===
The band released their second album Eros|Anteros in 2013. The band described the album as the "story of love and the anti-love (life and death), and the growth they have experienced through these trials." Their third album Rheia was released in 2016 and featured a more black metal, blackgaze and post-metal direction. The album received a 7.8 out of 10 from Pitchfork. Both Tanghe and Demolder cited Mark Kozelek as a major influence on the album's lyrics.

=== Hiatus (2018–2024) ===
In late 2017, the band said that they would be taking a break from touring and played their last show on 20 December in Brussels. The band's song "Ease Me" was included on the Metal Swim 2 compilation made by Adult Swim in 2019. The band was set to return from hiatus to play the 2020 ArcTanGent Festival in England. However, the festival was postponed until 2022 because of the COVID-19 pandemic and the band did not play.

During the hiatus, guitarist Demolder and drummer Coppers have continued playing with the band Wiegedood, while guitarist Bossu formed the band Predatory Void. Tanghe performed vocals on Amenra's 2021 album De Doorn.

=== Reunion (2025–present) ===
In October 2025, Oathbreaker's reunion was announced for the April 2026 Roadburn Festival in Tilburg, Netherlands, with the band playing Rheia in full for its tenth anniversary. The festival wrote, "After eight years of inactivity... when we got word that Oathbreaker were awakening from their collective slumber and had specifically requested to make their return at Roadburn we were honoured – and on board immediately." They also announced shows at ArcTanGent and Prepare the Ground festivals. In May 2026, the band released a 10th-anniversary remaster of Rheia.

== Musical style ==
Oathbreaker's eclectic style has been associated with various genres within the realms of punk rock, heavy metal and avant-garde music including black metal, post-hardcore, hardcore punk, post-metal, post-black metal, screamo, metalcore, crust punk, d-beat, sludge metal, art metal, shoegaze, and post-rock. It has been compared to that of Cobalt and Ghost Bath as well as Deathwish Inc. labelmates Deafheaven, Converge, Touché Amoré, Loma Prieta, and Planes Mistaken for Stars. Caro Tanghe's vocals have received attention as a prominent aspect of the band's sound; Exclaim noted that her "higher pitched screams rival [Converge's] Jacob Bannon's, while simultaneously being close enough to a black metal shriek, and desperate enough for screamo" while Stereogum praised her singing, stating it is "often melodic, and multi-tracked, and it gives these gigantic songs greater mass and momentum, as well as humanity and maybe even vulnerability." Furthermore, Metal Injection described her lyricism as "haunting and poetic, gothic and honest."

While Tanghe's first language is Dutch, she chooses to write lyrics in English. "I never thought about singing in Dutch because it just sounds really weird. English is a lot more poetic, but it is harder for me," she said.

== Members ==
Current

- Lennart Bossu – guitars (2008–present)
- Gilles Demolder – guitars, bass (2008–present)
- Caro Tanghe – vocals (2008–present)
- Wim Coppers – drums (2016–present)

Former

- Ivo Debrabandere – drums (2008–2016)

== Discography ==
=== Studio albums ===
- Mælstrøm (2011)
- Eros|Anteros (2013)
- Rheia (2016)

=== EPs ===
- Oathbreaker (2008)
- Amenra/Oathbreaker – Brethren Bound by Blood 3/3 (2011)
- An Audiotree Live Session (2016)
- Ease Me & 4 Interpretations (2020)

=== Singles ===
- "Ease Me" (2020)

=== Live albums ===
- Live at Vooruit (2015)

=== Compilations ===
- Metal Swim 2 (2019)

=== Music videos ===
Year	Name	Director
2011	"Origin"	
2011	"Glimpse of the Unseen"	Olli Bery
2013	"No Rest For The Weary"	Jeroen Mylle and Fabrice Parent
2016	"10:56" / "Second Son of R."	Jeroen Mylle and Fabrice Parent
2016	"Immortals"	Jeroen Mylle and Fabrice Parent
