= Trash Art! =

American record label

Trash Art! is an independent record label from Providence, Rhode Island, specializing in loud music from punk and metal subgenres. The label was founded in 1997, and has issued releases on vinyl and compact disc formats by 16, Apartment 213, As The Sun Sets, Backstabbers Inc, Cursed, Disappearer, Forensics, Meltdown, Today Is The Day, Trap Them, Verse, and XFilesX, amongst others.

== Current bands ==
- Backstabbers Incorporated
- Cursed
- Disappearer
- Forensics
- Meltdown
- Trap Them
- XFilesX

== Previous/one-off bands ==
- 16
- Another Dead Juliet
- Apartment 213
- As The Sun Sets
- Dahmer
- Draw Blood
- Paindriver
- Today Is The Day
- Verse

== See also ==
- List of record labels
