= God Is War =

Studio album by All Pigs Must Die
- Released: August 16, 2011
- Genre: Metalcore
- Length: 32:35
- Label: Southern Lord
- Producer: Kurt Ballou

All Pigs Must Die chronology
All Pigs Must Die (2010)	God Is War (2011)	Nothing Violates This Nature (2013)

Professional ratings
Review scores
Source	Rating
Rock Sound	(8/10)
AllMusic	3.5/5 stars
MetalSucks	(4/5)

God Is War is the first full-length studio album by the American band All Pigs Must Die. It was produced by Kurt Ballou and released on August 16, 2011 through Southern Lord Records.

== Track listing ==
No.	Title	Length
1.	"Death Dealer"	3:52
2.	"Pulverization"	1:54
3.	"Sacrosanct"	3:17
4.	"God Is War"	5:02
5.	"The Blessed Void"	3:25
6.	"Third World Genocide"	4:26
7.	"Extinction Is Ours"	2:21
8.	"Sadistic Vindicator"	8:22
Total length:		32:35

== Personnel ==
All Pigs Must Die

- Kevin Baker - vocals
- Ben Koller - drums
- Adam Wentworth - guitar
- Matt Woods - bass

Miscellaneous staff

- Kurt Ballou - production, engineering, mixing
- John Golden - mastering
- Florian Bertmer - illustrations
