= Eros/Anteros =

Eros|Anteros

Studio album by Oathbreaker
- Released: 16 July 2013
- Recorded: GodCity Studio
- Genre: Blackgaze; black metal; crust punk; shoegaze
- Length: 46:47
- Label: Deathwish Inc.
- Producer: Kurt Ballou

Oathbreaker chronology
Mælstrøm (2011)	Eros|Anteros (2013)	Rheia (2016)

Eros|Anteros is the second studio album by Belgian band Oathbreaker. It was released on 16 July 2013 by Deathwish Inc. The album has been praised for successfully mixing diverse genres including black metal, hardcore punk, and shoegaze.

The title references Eros and Anteros, gods of love in Greek mythology.

Professional ratings
Review scores
Source	Rating
Exclaim!	8/10

== Track listing ==
No.	Title	Length
1.	"(Beeltenis)"	2:34
2.	"No Rest for the Weary"	3:23
3.	"Upheaval"	3:11
4.	"As I Look Into the Abyss"	2:30
5.	"The Abyss Looks Into Me"	9:02
6.	"Condor Tongue"	2:35
7.	"Offer Aan De Leegte"	4:49
8.	"Agartha"	4:23
9.	"Nomads"	2:45
10.	"Clair Obscur"	11:25

== Personnel ==
=== Oathbreaker ===
- Caro Tanghe
- Lennart Bossu
- Gilles Demolder
- Ivo Debrabandere

=== Other ===
- Maurice Maeterlinck – poem on "(Beeltenis)" and "Clair Obscur"
- Kurt Ballou – additional guitars on "(Beeltenis)" and "Clair Obscur"

=== Production ===
- Kurt Ballou – engineering and production
- Brad Boatright – mastering
- Jeroen Mylle – photography
- Valentijn Goethals & Tomas Lootens – art direction and design
