= The One Above All, the End of All That Is =

Studio album by Curl Up and Die
- Released: 2005
- Recorded: Hothead Studios
- Length: 33:52
- Label: Revelation Records
- Producer: Alex Newport

Curl Up and Die chronology
...But the Past Ain't Through with Us (EP) (2003)	The One Above All, the End of All That Is (2005)

The One Above All, the End of All That Is is the second and final release by the American metalcore band Curl Up and Die.

The album was rated 3.5 out of 5 stars by PunkNews.org.

== Track listing ==
1. "An Uncomfortable Routine" – 4:54
2. "Antidepressants Are Depressing" – 0:56
3. "Ultra Carb Diet Carpooling Stupid Fucking Life" – 1:23
4. "The One Above All, the End of All That Is" – 0:38
5. "Instrumental" – 3:52
6. "Black Out" – 4:47
7. "There Ain't No Can't in American" – 1:14
8. "Zero MPH Fallover" – 0:51
9. "There Is Never Enough Time to Do Nothing" – 3:37
10. "I'm Trying to Fly to the Moon Using Two Magnets and Willpower" – 5:18
11. "Blood Mosh Hips Hair Lips Pills Fuck Death" – 6:16

== Personnel ==
- Jesse Fitts – drums
- Matt Fuchs – guitar
- Ryan Hartery – bass guitar
- Mike Minnick – vocals

Additional

- Alex Newport – engineering and mixing
- Alan Douches – mastering
- Dave Gorum – artwork and design
