= All Pigs Must Die (band) =

American hardcore band (2009–20??)

- Origin: Massachusetts, U.S.
- Genres: hardcore punk; crust punk; grindcore
- Years active: 2009–20??
- Labels: Nonbeliever, Southern Lord
- Members: Kevin Baker; Ben Koller; Adam Wentworth; Matt Woods; Brian Izzi

All Pigs Must Die is an American hardcore supergroup consisting of Kevin Baker of The Hope Conspiracy, Ben Koller of Converge, Adam Wentworth and Matt Woods of Bloodhorse, and Brian Izzi of Trap Them. All Pigs Must Die is signed to Nonbeliever Records, an imprint label of Shirts & Destroy.

== History ==
The band's debut EP, which was recorded at Kurt Ballou's GodCity Studio, was released in October 2010. The cover artwork was designed by German illustrator Florian Bertmer.

In December 2010 the band began recording for their second release, again with Kurt Ballou at GodCity Studio. In March 2011, it was announced that their upcoming album would be titled God Is War, and that the band had signed with Southern Lord.

Their second full-length album, Nothing Violates This Nature, was released in 2013.

== Members ==
- Kevin Baker – vocals
- Adam Wentworth – guitar
- Matt Woods – bass
- Ben Koller – drums
- Brian Izzi – guitar

== Discography ==
=== Studio albums ===
- God Is War (2011) – Southern Lord
- Nothing Violates This Nature (2013) – Southern Lord
- Hostage Animal (2017) - Southern Lord

=== Extended plays ===
- All Pigs Must Die (2010) – Nonbeliever
- Curse of Humanity (2012) – Southern Lord
