= Seizures in Barren Praise =

Studio album by Trap Them
- Released: November 11, 2008
- Recorded: 2008
- Genre: Grindcore, crust punk
- Length: 25:09
- Label: Deathwish (DWI78)
- Producer: Kurt Ballou

Trap Them chronology
| Séance Prime (2007) | Seizures in Barren Praise (2008) | Filth Rations (2010) |

Professional ratings
Review scores
| Source | Rating |
|---|---|
| AllMusic | 4/5 stars |
| Decoy Music | 4/5 stars |
| Lambgoat | 9/10 |
| Punknews.org | 4/5 stars |
| Rocksounds | 9/10 stars |

Seizures in Barren Praise is the second full-length album by extreme metal band, Trap Them. It was released on November 11, 2008. It continues the days in a now non-linear fashion (starting from Day Nineteen, after Day Eighteen: Enders from the Trap Them/Extreme Noise Terror split) in the fictional area of Barren Praise.

== Track listing ==
All tracks are written by Brian Vincent Izzi and Ryan McKenney except where noted.

| No. | Title | Length |
|---|---|---|
| 1. | "Day Nineteen: Fucking Viva" | 1:41 |
| 2. | "Day Twenty Eight: Targets" | 2:17 |
| 3. | "Day Twenty Six: Angels Anonymous In Transit" | 2:09 |
| 4. | "Day Twenty Nine: Reincarnation Of Lost Lones" | 1:05 |
| 5. | "Day Twenty Five: Guignol Serene" | 1:59 |
| 6. | "Day Twenty: Flesh & Below" | 2:19 |
| 7. | "Day Twenty Four: Gutterbomb Heaven On The Grid" (McKenney) | 2:47 |
| 8. | "Day Twenty Three: Invertopia"/Day Thirty: "Class Warmth" | 2:22 |
| 9. | "Day Twenty One: Roam/Day Twenty Two: Absent Civilian" | 1:08 |
| 10. | "Day Thirty One: Mission Convincers" | 7:22 |

== Personnel ==
- Kurt Ballou – bass, guitar, noise, producer, engineer
- Brian Vincent Izzi – guitar
- Ryan McKenney – vocals, Lyricist
- Stephen LaCour – bass
- Mike Justian – drums
- Nick Zampiello – mastering
