= Backstabbers Incorporated =

American grindcore band

- Origin: Portsmouth, New Hampshire, United States
- Genres: Hardcore punk, grindcore, crust punk
- Years active: 2000–2008
- Labels: Black Market Activities, Trash Art!
- Members: Matt Serven; Mark Blanchard; Anthony Ruscio; Mark Richards
- Past members: Brian Serven; Sean McAllister; Jonah Livingston; Nick Reddy; Brian Izzi; Mike Justian; Ryan McKenney

Backstabbers Incorporated (sometimes called Backstabbers Inc. or BSI, and previously known as Life Passed On) were an American hardcore band based in Portsmouth, New Hampshire.

== History ==
Backstabbers Incorporated was formed as Life Passed On in the late nineties by Matt Serven (guitar) and Ryan McKenney (vocals). In 2000, a lineup changes prompted the band to change their name to Backstabbers Incorporated. Brian Serven joined around this time. They have released albums for Black Market Activities (distributed through Metal Blade) and Trash Art! Records in addition to some splits and EPs on smaller DIY labels.

The band has gone on several US tours, including a short tour in January 2005, and a more extensive East Coast Tour from October to December 2005. In 2006, the band embarked on a European tour during August and September. Since a short tour in March 2008 around Dudefest, the band has largely been inactive.

On August 24, 2010, BSI announced via Facebook that their upcoming full-length album would be released on Blackmarket Activities.

January 1, 2014 saw the release of MIA: a raw, stripped down, claustrophobic Hardcore record. In Spring of 2015 the band re-emerged with yet another line-up change and a brief East Coast/Midwestern Tour.

== Musical style ==
The band is typically described as punk and hardcore as umbrella terms, but state that other influences such as grindcore, crossover thrash, post-hardcore, and death metal are often present. The use of a variety of vocal styles, from high pitched screaming to deeper growls, often serve to identify the band in both the hardcore and metal genres. On their earlier releases they are typically described as more direct and stripped-down, while their later releases such as Kamikaze Missions show an expansion of their sound. Their style that now incorporated a more diverse array of extreme metal and hardcore influences in longer song structures. Brian Serven also cites film composers Michael Nyman and Yann Tiersen as influences.

The band is also sometimes tied to the straight edge music culture, due to the Serven's not using drugs or alcohol and being vegan. However, they expressed that these decisions are not tied to any youth-orientated subculture like straight edge, but are personal choices.

== Discography ==
Albums

- 2003: Bare as Bones (Black Market Activities)
- 2004: Kamikaze Missions (Trash Art!)
- 2014: Missing In Action (Self Release)

EPs

- 2000: Evolution (Cadmium Sick Records)
- 2001: While You Were Sleeping (Trash Art!)
- 2002: Theory/History (Element Records)

Splits

- 2001: Bad Cop, No Cop - 7" with Advocate (Black Day Propaganda)
- 2003: People Don't Take Photographs of Things They Want to Forget - with Advocate, Trap Them & Kill Them, Purity's Failure, and Transistor Transistor (Broken Press)

Demo

- Backstabbers Incorporated (Self-released demo tape)

== Members ==
Current

- Matt Serven – Guitar, vocals (1998–Present)
- Mark Richards (Current)
- Anthony Ruscio – Bass (Current)
- Mark Blanchard – Drums (Current)

Former

- Brian Serven Bass, Guitar, Vocals - (2000–2018)
- Sean McAlister-Bass
- Nick Reddy – Bass (2004–2014)
- Jonah Livingston – Drums (2004–2014)
- Ryan McKenney – Vocals (1998-?)
- Brian Izzi – Guitar (2001- ?)
- Mike Justian – Guitar, Drums
- Mike Quinn – Drums
- Matt Dunn – Drums
