= Trap Them =

American hardcore punk band

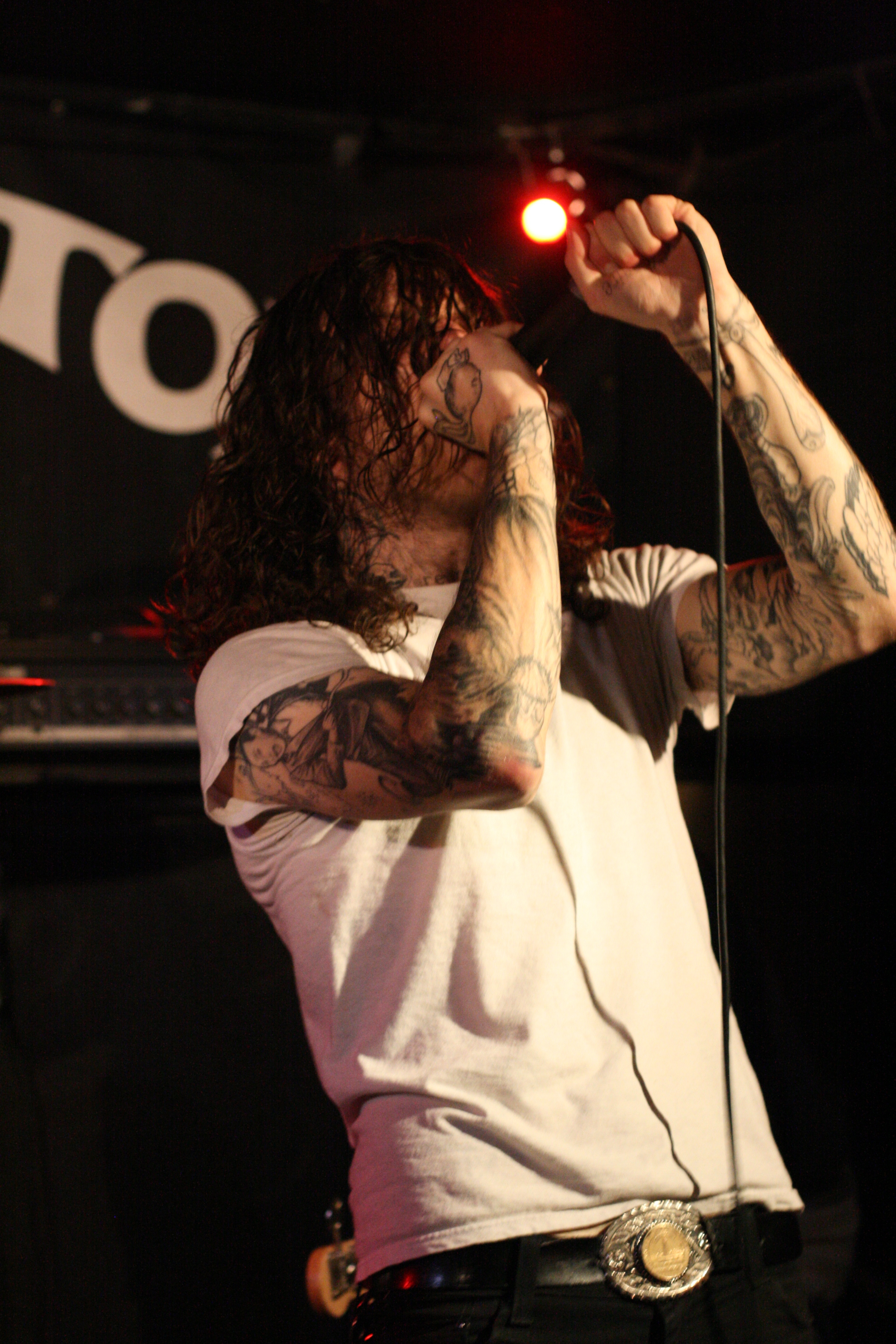
- Ryan McKenney performing at the Knitting Factory, Brooklyn

Background information
- Also known as: Trap Them + Kill Them, 77+K7
- Origin: Salem, New Hampshire, United States
- Genres: Grindcore; crust punk; metalcore; hardcore punk
- Years active: 2001–2017
- Labels: Prosthetic, Southern Lord, Trash Art!, Deathwish
- Past members: Ryan McKenney; Brian Izzi; Brad Fickeisen; Galen Baudhuin; Stephen LaCour; Mike Justian; Mike Sharp; Scott DeFusco; Nat Coghlan; Chris Maggio
- Website: http://www.trapthem.net

Trap Them was an American hardcore punk band formed in Salem, New Hampshire in 2001. They released five studio albums and five EPs, including a split EP with Extreme Noise Terror.

== History ==
Trap Them began in 2001 as a side-project for Ryan McKenney, who was the vocalist of Backstabbers Incorporated, and Brian Izzi, briefly a second guitarist for Backstabbers Incorporated and consistent member of December Wolves. The pair met as employees of Newbury Comics in Salem, New Hampshire. They took the band's name from a 1977 film by Joe D'Amato called Trap Them And Kill Them, known also as Emanuelle E Gli Ultimi Cannibali and Emanuelle and the Last Cannibals. They recorded and self-released an MCD as Trap Them and Kill Them. Both departed Backstabbers Incorporated in 2008 and Trap Them became their full-time project.

On April 3, 200, they released their debut album, Sleepwell Deconstructor. They toured Europe in early 2008 with the Ocean and Rotten Sound.

Trap Them recorded a split EP with crust punk band Extreme Noise Terror and toured the U.S. with Napalm Death. Their second album, Seizures in Barren Praise, was released in November 2008. In May 2009, the band played on the annual Maryland Deathfest music festival in Baltimore, Maryland. The band toured the US with Victims and Black Breath in May and June 2009, and Skeletonwitch and Saviours in mid-July.

In 2010, the band released the EP Filth Rations as a limited cassette release restricted to fifty copies available at their appearance at the Scion Rock Festival. The EP was later released on Southern Lord Records on 12" vinyl featuring an etching on the B-side by artist Justin Bartlett, who also drew the main cover.

In late 2010, it was announced that in March 2011 the band would release their third full-length, Darker Handcraft, through Prosthetic Records, their first for the label since signing in mid-2009. In April 2011, the band toured Europe to promote the album as main support for Rotten Sound.

On April 7, 2014, the band completed work on their following album, Blissfucker, released on June 10, 2014. It was the first album to feature bassist Galen Baudhuin (Infera Bruo) and drummer Brad Fickeisen (No Salvation, ex-The Red Chord).

Crown Feral, the band's fifth and final studio album, was released on September 23, 2016, via Prosthetic Records. The album was recorded with producer Kurt Ballou at the God City recording studio and featured artwork from artist Mattias Frisk.

The band performed their final three shows in November in New York City, Montreal and Boston before disbanding.

== Musical style and influences ==
Trap Them's music has been categorised as grindcore, crust punk, hardcore punk and metalcore. The band make heavy use of the Boss HM-2 guitar pedal, which creates a distinctive guitar tone that was first popularised by Swedish death metal bands. Metal Injection writer Christopher Luedtke described their sound as "Bringing a hardcore/punk, d-beat, and grind attitude with death metal riffs ala Grave".

The band's influences include hardcore and crust punk bands, such as Black Flag, Born Against, and Tragedy and metal bands like Dismember and Entombed.

== Members ==
Final

- Brian Izzi - guitar (2001-2017)
- Ryan McKenney - vocals (2001-2017)
- Brad Fickeisen - drums (2013-2017)
- Galen Baudhuin - bass (2013-2017)

Past

- Nat Coghlan - bass (2006-2007)
- Scott DeFusco - drums (2006-2007)
- Mike Sharp - drums (2007-2008)
- Derek Black - bass (2007)
- Stephen LaCour - bass (2007-2011)
- Mike Justian - drums (2008-2009)
- Jeff Lohrber - drums (2009)
- Chris Maggio - drums (2009-2013)

Timeline

== Discography ==
=== Studio albums ===
- Sleepwell Deconstructor (2007, Trash Art!)
- Seizures in Barren Praise (2008, Deathwish)
- Darker Handcraft (2011, Prosthetic)
- Blissfucker (2014, Prosthetic)
- Crown Feral (2016, Prosthetic)

=== EPs and splits ===
- 77K7 (2002, self-released)
- Cunt Heir to the Throne (2007, Trash Art!)
- Séance Prime (2007, Deathwish)
- Extreme Noise Terror / Trap Them (split with Extreme Noise Terror) (2008, Deathwish)
- Filth Rations (2010, Southern Lord)

=== Compilation contributions ===
- People Don't Take Pictures of Things They Want to Forget (2003)
