= All Pigs Must Die (EP) =

EP by All Pigs Must Die
- Released: 2010
- Genre: Metalcore
- Length: 20:01
- Label: Nonbeliever
- Producer: Kurt Ballou

All Pigs Must Die chronology
All Pigs Must Die (2010)	God Is War (2011)

Professional ratings
Review scores
Source	Rating
Punknews	4.5/5 stars

All Pigs Must Die is the first EP by American supergroup of the same name. It was released in 2010 on Nonbeliever Records.

== Track list ==
No.	Title	Length
1.	"Hungry Wolf, Easy Prey"	3:38
2.	"Sermon for the End"	3:42
3.	"Die Ignorant"	3:13
4.	"Noxchi Assault"	2:49
5.	"Death in My Wake"	6:35

== Personnel ==
All Pigs Must Die

- Matt Woods – bass
- Ben Koller – drums
- Adam Wentworth – guitars
- Kevin Baker – vocals

Production

- Kurt Ballou – recording, mixing
- John Golden – mastering
