= Rise and Fall (band) =

Belgian hardcore punk band

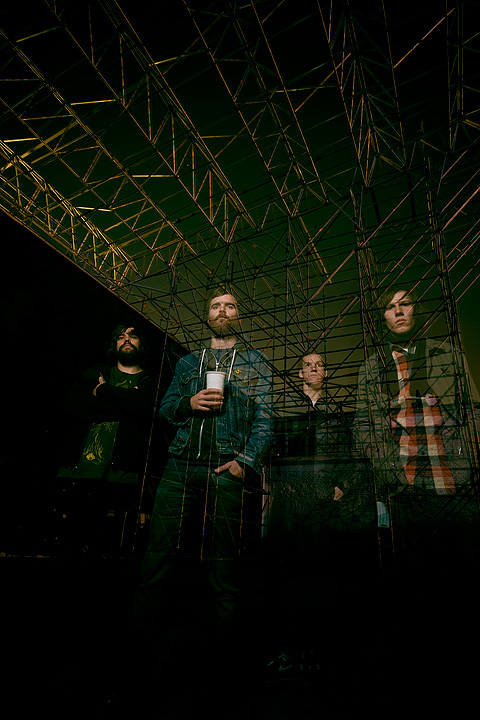
- Rise and Fall in 2009

Background information
- Origin: Ghent, Belgium
- Genres: Hardcore punk, metalcore, crust punk
- Years active: 2002–2012
- Labels: Deathwish Inc., Reflections, JTTP
- Members: Cedric; Vince; Björn; Wim
- Past members: Daan; JP; Murph; F Double; AK

Rise and Fall was a Belgian hardcore punk band from Ghent, formed 2002 by members of The Deal and Kingpin. They were among a few European bands currently signed to American hardcore label Deathwish Inc. Rise and Fall have been influenced by bands such as Black Flag, Converge, Neurosis, Tragedy and Entombed.

== History ==
=== Early career and Hellmouth (2002–2004) ===
Rise and Fall was formed in 2002 in Ghent, Belgium, as a side project of members of The Deal and Kingpin, eventually becoming the most important band for all four members as The Deal and Kingpin was disbanded. Following some lineup changes, the band released their first album Hellmouth, in April 2004. The album was released on CD a few months later by JTTP Records in Germany and on vinyl by Belgian label Anger Management Records. The band then set out on a self-booked European tour in August, and supported 100 Demons on their European tour in October. During these tours the band started writing material for their following album.

=== Into Oblivion, Our Circle Is Vicious, and Faith (2005–2012) ===
In March 2005 the drummer departed from the band, stunting the new album's progress. In April 2005, one year after it was originally recorded, "Hellmouth" was released in the United States with bonus tracks on Philadelphia's "SA Mob" record label.

In the meantime, ex-Course of Action drummer and long-time friend Jp joined the band, and together they finished writing the new album.

In July 2005, the band recorded their second full-length "Into Oblivion". The album was recorded in CCR Studios in Zulte, Belgium, engineered by Vincent Tetaert of Amenra and mixed in Boston, MA at Godcity Studio by Kurt Ballou (Converge). American label Deathwish Inc. and European Reflections Records put out the album. Throughout the rest of 2005, Rise and Fall toured throughout Europe.

Rise and Fall also played major festivals, including Pukkelpop in Hasselt, Belgium and Hellfest Summer Open Air in Clisson, France. In 2006, Rise and Fall recorded a cover of Integrity's song "Kingdom of Hell", which was released on Escapist Records' Various Artists compilation Harder They Fall: Tribute to Integrity in February 2007.

In July 2007, Rise and Fall releases Clawing, a special 3 tracks 7" on Deathwish Inc. in support of a 70 days long tour. The 7", featuring stunning artwork form German artist Florian Bertmer showcases one new song (Clawing), a re-recorded track from "Hellmouth" (Bottom Feeder) and a cover from the band Alice in Chains (Them Bones).

Rise and Fall released their third studio album, Our Circle Is Vicious, on 27 October 2009 through Deathwish Inc. The album artwork was designed by Jacob Bannon of the hardcore group Converge. Decibel rated at 7 out 10, Punknews.org rated it at four out five.

Their fourth and final studio album, Faith, through Deathwish Inc on 20 March 2012. A music video for the song "Hidden Hands" was released in February 2012. Alternative Press rated Faith at four out five, while Lambgoat rated it eight out ten.

== Tours ==
In 2006, Rise and Fall extended their touring schedule:

- February 2006: European tour with Doomriders.
- April 2006: First US tour (east coast) with Blacklisted and Guns Up!
- Summer 2006: Appearances at independent hardcore summer festivals such as Fluff Fest (to which they returned in 2007 and 2009).
- October/November 2006: Full European tour with Blacklisted
- November 2006: European tour with FVK, formerly known as Cro-Mags (Line up: John Josef, Mackie Jayson, Tom Capone and Cache Tolman

2007 marks the year of Rise and Fall turning into a full-time band for its all 4 members. Rise and Fall is on the road 5 out of the first 8 months of the year.

- January 2007: UK tour with The Hope Conspiracy
- February 2007: European Tour with Comeback Kid
- March/April 2007: Full US tour with Iron Age
- June/July 2007: Full European tour with Converge and Animosity
- August 2007: Full US tour with Have Heart

== Members ==
Current

- Cedric – guitars
- Vince – bass
- Björn – vocals
- Wim – drums

Former

- Daan – drums
- JP – drums
- Murph – drums
- F Double – guitars
- AK – guitars

== Discography ==
Studio albums

- Hellmouth (2004)
- Into Oblivion (2005)
- Our Circle Is Vicious (2009)
- Faith (2012)

EPs and singles

- Demo (2003)
- Weapons (split with Paint the Town Red) (2003)
- Clawing (2007)
- "Deceiver / Sinking in Skin" (2011)

Live albums

- Alive in Sin (2019)

Compilation appearances

- GSR Records Comp
- Integrity Tribute CD

Music videos

- "Hidden Hands" (2012)
