= Curl Up and Die =

American metalcore band

- Origin: Las Vegas, Nevada, U.S.
- Genres: Metalcore, Mathcore
- Years active: 1998–2005, 2019–present
- Labels: Status, Revelation
- Members: Mike Minnick; Matt Fuchs; Ryan Hartery; Keil Corcoran
- Past members: Jesse Fitts; Geoff Bergman; Gustavo Mendoza

Curl Up and Die, formed in late 1998, is an American metalcore band from Las Vegas, Nevada.

== History ==
After demos in 1998 and 1999, Curl Up and Die recorded its first release in early 2000, an album called 1998. An EP, The Only Good Bug Is A Dead Bug, was picked up by Status Recordings in early 2001. Prior to forming Curl Up and Die, vocalist Mike Minnick was a founding member of Vegas grindcore band The Weirding Way, playing drums.

The group signed with Revelation Records in 2001 and their debut full-length CD, Unfortunately, We're Not Robots, was released in May 2002. Two EPs, We May Be Through With the Past (on Status) and But the Past Ain't Through With Us (on Revelation) were released, as well as one more album, The One Above All, The End Of All That Is, before the band broke up in late 2005.

After an earlier attempt to reunite in 2012, the band successfully reunited in 2019 with drummer Keil Corcoran taking the place of Jesse Fitts.

== Other projects ==
Vocalist Mike Minnick provides vocals for the baseball-themed grindcore band Puig Destroyer and post-hardcore supergroup Less Art. Corcoran and Fuchs also started a grindcore-influenced side project called Red Vom.

== Band members ==
=== Latest members ===
- Matt Fuchs – guitar
- Ryan Hartery – bass
- Mike Minnick – vocals
- Keil Corcoran – drums

=== Former members ===
- Jesse Fitts – drums
- Geoff Bergman – bass (went on to play in Poison the Well)
- Jon Brown – guitar
- Mike Pinaud – drums
- Gustavo Mendoza – bass
- Gavan Nelson – bass

== Discography ==
=== Albums ===
- Unfortunately, We're Not Robots (Revelation, 2002)
- The One Above All, the End of All That Is (Revelation, 2005)

=== EPs ===
- The Only Good Bug Is a Dead Bug (Status, 2000)
- 1998 (Status, 2001)
- We May Be Through with the Past... (Status, 2003)
- But the Past Ain't Through with Us (Revelation, 2003)
