= The Hope Conspiracy =

American hardcore punk band

- Origin: Boston, Massachusetts, U.S.
- Genres: Hardcore punk, melodic hardcore
- Years active: 1999–present
- Labels: Deathwish Inc., Equal Vision
- Members: Kevin Baker; Jonas Feinberg; Neeraj Kane; Jared Shavelson
- Past members: Adam Patterson; Dan Zimmerman; Aaron Lisi; Jarrod Alexander; Tim Cossar

The Hope Conspiracy is an American hardcore punk band from Boston formed in late 1999. They were picked up by Equal Vision Records and Bridge 9 Records before signing a deal with Deathwish Inc.

== Biography ==
With the help of Mark Thompson of Tortuga and Hydra Head Records, The Hope Conspiracy headed to Godcity Studios in Norwood, Massachusetts to record their first demo in November 1999. It consisted of three songs ("Escapist", "Divinity Sickness", and "When the Doves Fly"). They produced 1000 copies of the tape, and managed to present 200 copies at their first show with black and white covers (which were quickly made on the way to the gig). Then they produced 800 more color copies of the demo cover based on a design by Aaron Turner. In early 2000, Turner brought up the idea of the demo cassette being put on CD and 7-inch vinyl, and the band accepted the invitation. The CD version contained one extra song, "It Meant Nothing". In both demos, the song "When the Doves Fly" was renamed to "Regret Kills". This demo is now out of print.

In July 2000, The Hope Conspiracy set out recording their debut full-length entitled Cold Blue on Equal Vision Records. The 10-song album was recorded in a week in both Godcity Studios and The Outpost in Stoughton, Massachusetts. It was released on October 24, 2000. In the next two years the band toured off of this album, contributed a cover of "Nervous Breakdown" to the Back on Black 7-inch Black Flag tribute on Initial Records, and released an EP called File 03 on Bridge 9 Records. File 03 was a rerelease of their original demo tracks plus two new tracks (one song of original material called "No Love Goes Unpunished" and a cover of Naked Raygun's "Treason"). The European version of "File 03" is available from Join the Team Player Records.

When it came time to record their second full-length, the band had gone through what they called "a long overdue lineup solidification." The album, entitled Endnote, was recorded during May and June 2002 in Brooklyn's Atomic Studios. The 12-song album was produced by Dean Baltunosis and was released on October 17, 2002. In November 2002, Deathwish Records released a limited split 7-inch with The Suicide File with a song called "Failure", which was an outtake from earlier recording sessions.

The band went on a hiatus in 2004. In that time, Kevin Baker did vocals for Bars, while Jared Shavelson played drums for None More Black.

Their third album, Death Knows Your Name, was released on September 19, 2006, on Deathwish Records. The album has received favorable reviews. As a teaser, the record label released the Hang Your Cross EP in July 2006.

Recorded by Kurt Ballou at God City Studios, the EP True Nihilist was released in 2009 on Deathwish Inc.

Their EP Confusion/Chaos/Misery was released in 2023. This was followed by the album Tools of Oppression/Rule by Deception in 2024.

== Members ==
=== Current ===
- Kevin Baker – vocals (1999–present)
- Jonas Feinberg – bass (1999–present)
- Neeraj Kane – guitar (1999–2001, 2006–present; mainly participates in songwriting)
- Jared Shavelson – drums (2002–present)

==== Touring ====
- Jim Carroll – guitar (2003–present; usually replaces Kane for live dates)

=== Former ===
- Adam Patterson – drums (1999–2002)
- Dan Zimmerman – guitar (1999–2002)
- Aaron Lisi – guitar (2001–2003)
- Jarrod Alexander – drums (2002)
- Tim Cossar – guitar (2005–2008)

== Discography ==
Studio albums

- Cold Blue (2000 Equal Vision Records)
- Endnote (2002 Equal Vision)
- Death Knows Your Name (2006 Deathwish Inc.)
- Tools of Oppression/Rule by Deception (2024 Deathwish Inc.)

EPs and demos

- Self-titled demo (1999, 2000 Life Recordings)
- File 03 (2001 Bridge 9 Records / European version on Join the Team Player Records)
- Limited split 7-inch with The Suicide File (2002 Deathwish)
- Hang Your Cross EP (2006 vinyl on Deathwish Records / CD version licensed to Resist Records)
- True Nihilist 7' (2009 vinyl on Deathwish)
- Confusion/Chaos/Misery EP (2023 vinyl on Deathwish)

== Music videos ==
- "Fragile" (Live) (2000)
