= Kurt Ballou =

American musician and record producer

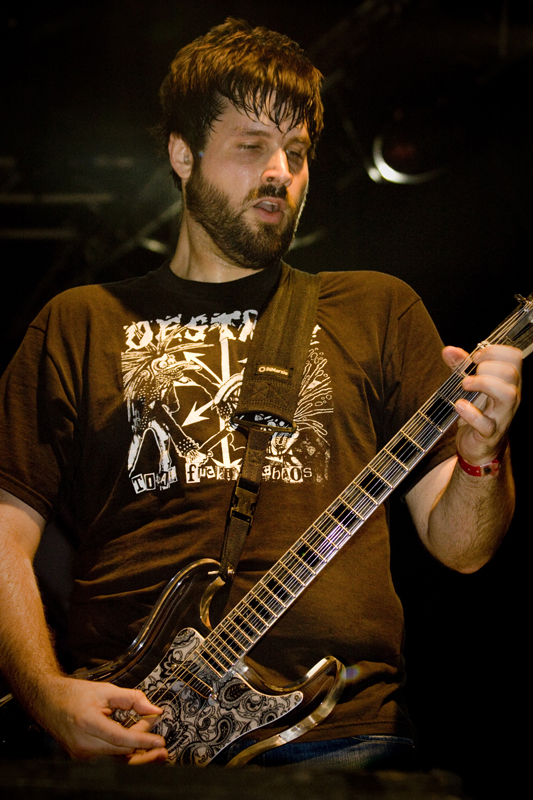
- Ballou in 2010

Background information
- Also known as: Kurt Parker Ballou
- Born: February 1, 1974 (age 52)
- Origin: Massachusetts, U.S.
- Genres: Metalcore; hardcore punk; mathcore; grindcore
- Occupations: Musician; producer; recording engineer
- Instrument: Guitar
- Works: Production discography
- Years active: 1990–present
- Member of: Converge
- Formerly of: The Huguenots; Kid Kilowatt; Blue/Green Heart

Kurt Parker Ballou (born February 1, 1974) is an American musician and record producer based in Massachusetts, best known as the guitarist for metalcore band Converge and for his recording and production work at his own GodCity Studio.

== Early and personal life ==
Kurt Ballou started playing saxophone in elementary school. He performed in jazz band, concert band and orchestra, dabbling between baritone saxophone, bassoon and bass clarinet. Ballou was accepted to join the Hartford School of Music, but he opted to study aerospace engineering instead. His father used to have a guitar that Ballou played occasionally, but it did not interest him until a school friend gave him Slayer tapes around the age of sixteen.

He is a vegan and follows a straight edge lifestyle.

== Career ==
Since 1990, Kurt Ballou has played in the metalcore band Converge. From 1996 to 2000 Ballou played in the hardcore punk band The Huguenots. From 1996 to 1999 Ballou and Stephen Brodsky played in the rock band Kid Kilowatt. In 1998 Ballou established GodCity Studio. From 1999 to 2002 Ballou and Ben Koller played in the hardcore punk band Blue/Green Heart.

=== God City Studio ===
In the late 1990s, Kurt Ballou was working as a biomedical engineer when his then-project got cancelled. Instead of selecting a different position within the same company that he had worked with for six years, Ballou opted to receive a severance package which he used to build his own recording studio. His experiences and knowledge in engineering carry over to his recording work. In regards to Ballou's technical precision as a producer, Jacob Bannon (of Converge) has stated, "Nothing gets by him—it is inspiring to watch him work."

Established in 1998, God City Studio is located in Ballou's home state of Massachusetts. One of the earliest recordings from the studio was Cave In's Until Your Heart Stops. Ballou handled all production, engineering, and mastering for the record.

Ballou has stated that collaborating on Jane Doe with co-producer Matthew Ellard was a huge learning experience for him as an engineer and producer. Ellard jokingly stated Ballou "watched him like a hawk" during the engineering and producing process.

In 2005 Ballou remixed and remastered Converge's Petitioning the Empty Sky and When Forever Comes Crashing. Ballou has stated that because of the quality of [Converge's] recordings has improved so much that the original recordings were "becoming distracting". Ballou has also produced and co-produced several Converge albums, including 2001's Jane Doe, 2004's You Fail Me and 2006's No Heroes. He has also produced a number of independent metal and hardcore bands, including Genghis Tron's Board Up the House, Torche's Meanderthal, Disfear's Live the Storm and Darkest Hour's Godless Prophets & the Migrant Flora.

One reason that motivated Ballou to get in to the studio side of music was to have "maximum control over Converge's music." He further stated, "When we were starting out, no one wanted to help us anyway, so if we didn't take control, nothing was going to get done." Ballou has claimed to admire producers such as Ken Andrews, Martin Bisi, Fred Drake, Steve Albini, and Don Zientara.

Ballou has also contributed to music-production education. In 2013, he taught a multi-day recording and engineering course for CreativeLive, covering his workflow at GodCity Studio and demonstrating techniques used on Converge recordings. He later appeared as a guest instructor on the Nail The Mix platform, where he provided an in-depth breakdown of his mix for Converge's "I Can Tell You About Pain."

== Equipment ==
- Guitars commonly used: GodCity Instruments guitars, Wild Customs The Savage One w/ EMG P85 bridge pickup, First Act Custom Sheena Guitar w/ EMG 81 bridge pickup, Warmoth Custom Jazzmaster W/ EMG 89 bridge pickup, First Act Custom Offset-Horns Double-Cutaway, Rickenbacker 650A w/ EMG 81 bridge pickup.
- Amps commonly used: Orange OR50 head, Sparrows Sons overdrive std (aka Sparrow amp), Bad Cat Black Cat head, Bad Cat Lynx head, Marshall 1987x Plexi Reissue, 1978 Marshall 50-watt JMP 2204, Ampeg V-4 head, Guild Thunderbass.
- Speaker Enclosures commonly used: Emperor 6x12 cabinet (2), Marshall customized 4x12 cabinet w/ four "Eminence vintage 30 clone" 12-inch speakers, Marshall 8x10 cabinet w/ stock 15-watt Celestions.
- Effects commonly used: Providence Stampede Distortion, Boss GE-7 Graphic Equalizer, Akai Headrush, Earthquaker Devices Avalanche Run, Boss PS-3 Pitch Shifter/Delay, Boss HM-2 Heavy Metal, TC Electronic Polytune, Boss Noise Suppressor, TC Electronic Mimiq.

== Discography ==
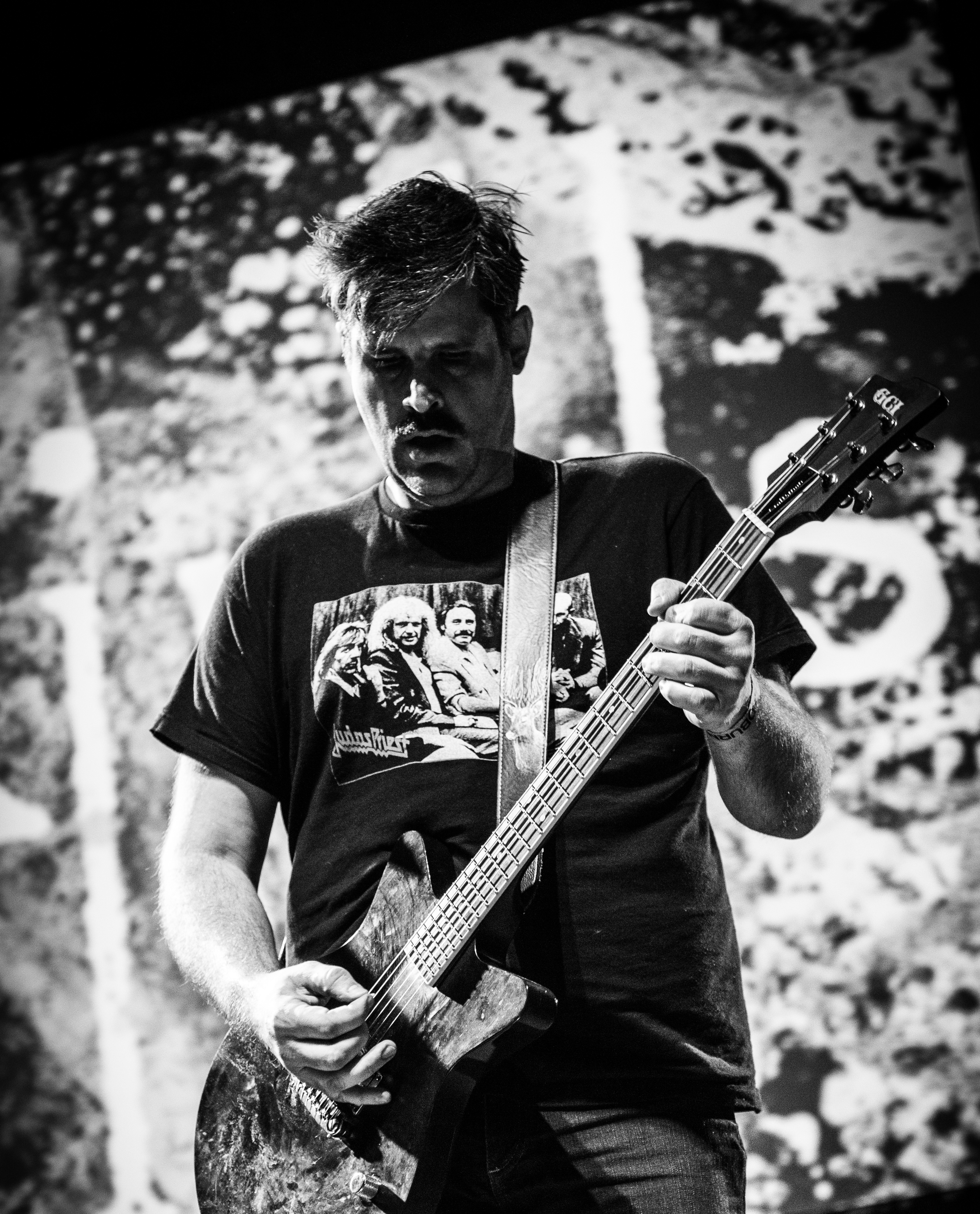
Ballou with Converge in 2018

=== With Converge ===
- Halo in a Haystack (1994)
- Petitioning the Empty Sky (1996)
- When Forever Comes Crashing (1998)
- Jane Doe (2001)
- You Fail Me (2004)
- No Heroes (2006)
- Axe to Fall (2009)
- All We Love We Leave Behind (2012)
- The Dusk in Us (2017)
- Bloodmoon: I (2021)
- Love Is Not Enough (2026)
- Hum of Hurt (2026)

=== With The Huguenots ===
- The Huguenots (1998) (EP)
- The Huguenots / Sevenpercentsolution (2000) (split with Sevenpercentsolution)
- Discography (2007)

=== With Blue/Green Heart ===
- Self Esteem Through Modern Science (2001) (EP)

=== With Kid Kilowatt ===
- Guitar Method (2004)

=== As an additional/guest musician ===
Year	Artist	Album	Contributions
1998	Cave In	Until Your Heart Stops	Guitar, percussion, vocals
2000	Supermachiner	Rise of the Great Machine	Guitar, saxophone, electronics
2000	Garrison	A Mile in Cold Water	Slide guitar
2002	Nationale Blue	A Different Kind of Listening	Melodica
2002	In Pieces	Learning to Accept Silence	Harmonica, melodica, slide guitar
2002	Curl Up and Die	Unfortunately, We're Not Robots	Vocals
2004	Old Man Gloom	Christmas	Guitars, drums, drum programing, vocals
2004	Last Perfection	Drawing Conclusions	Guitar
2004	Suicide Note	Too Sick to Dance Forever	Guitars, vocals
2005	Mi Amore	The Lamb	Guitars, solos
2005	New Idea Society	You Are Awake or Asleep	Drums
2006	Kahoots	Fourteen Ghosts	Saxophone
2007	Animosity	Animal	Saxophone
2007	Pygmy Lush	Bitter River	Saxophone, melodica, slide guitar
2007	Coliseum	No Salvation	Keyboards
2007	Trap Them	Sleepwell Deconstructor	Guitars
2007	The Casual Lean	Swears	Guitars, vocals
2007	The One AM Radio	This Too Will Pass	Drum engineering
2007	New Idea Society	World Is Bright and Lonely	Guitars
2008	Genghis Tron	Board Up the House	Toy drums
2008	Verse	Aggression	Drum engineering
2008	Torche	Meanderthal	Guitars
2008	Pygmy Lush	Mount Hope	Percussion
2008	Trap Them	Seizures in Barren Praise	Bass, guitars, noise
2008	Clouds	We Are Above You	Synthesizer, saxophone, guitar, slide guitar
2009	Supermachiner	Rust	Guitar, saxophone, electronics
2009	Rise and Fall	Our Circle Is Vicious	Additional percussion
2010	Trap Them	Filth Rations	Glockenspiel
2011	KEN mode	Venerable	Slide guitar
2011	Des Ark	Don't Rock the Boat, Sink the Fucker	Space bong
2012	High on Fire	De Vermis Mysteriis	Guitar
2013	Oathbreaker	Eros/Anteros	Guitar
2014	Trap Them	Blissfucker	Guitar
2014	Old Man Gloom	The Ape of God	Guitar
2015	Sweet Cobra	Earth	Guitar
2015	The Armed	Untitled	
2017	Full of Hell	Trumpeting Ecstasy	Bass
2017	Mutoid Man	War Moans	Guitar
2017	All Pigs Must Die	Hostage Animal	Guitar
2017	Chelsea Wolfe	Hiss Spun	Guitar
2017	Wear Your Wounds	WYW	
2017	Examination Of The...	The Whitest Of Elephants	Slide guitar
2018	Baptists	Beacon of Faith	Vocals, soundscapes
2019	Crowhurst	III	Drum programming
2019	SECT	Blood Of The Beasts	Guitar

== Awards and nominations ==
=== Heavy Music Awards ===
Year	Nominee / work	Award	Result	Ref.
2018	Himself	Best Producer	Nominated	

== See also ==
- Category:Albums produced by Kurt Ballou
