= Converge discography =

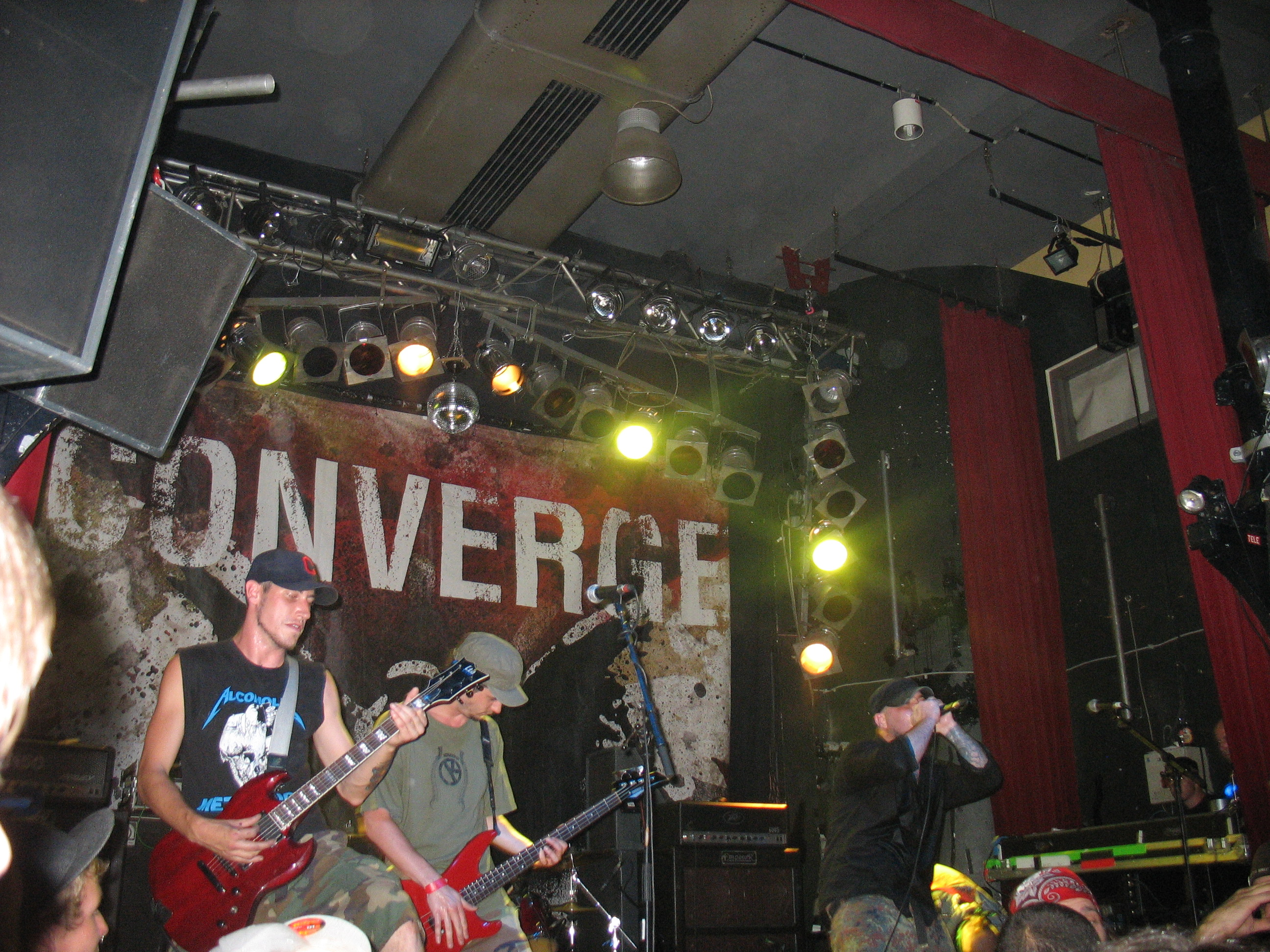
- Converge performing in 2008
- Studio albums: 12
- Extended plays: 5
- Compilation albums: 2
- Singles: 1
- Video albums: 1
- Music videos: 5
- Splits: 5
- Other appearances: 3
- Demos: 5

The discography of American metalcore band Converge consists of twelve studio albums, three compilation albums, two video albums, six extended plays (EPs), and five split releases.

== Albums ==
=== Studio albums ===
List of studio albums, with selected chart positions
Title	Album details	Chart positions								
Title	Album details	US	US Hard Rock	US Rock	AUS	BEL	GER	JPN	SCT	UK
Halo in a Haystack	Released: 1994; Label: Earthmaker	—	—	—	—	—	—	—	—	—
Petitioning the Empty Sky	Released: 1996; Label: Ferret	—	—	—	—	—	—	—	—	—
When Forever Comes Crashing	Released: April 14, 1998; Label: Equal Vision	—	—	—	—	—	—	—	—	—
Jane Doe	Released: September 4, 2001; Label: Equal Vision	—	—	—	—	—	—	—	—	—
You Fail Me	Released: September 21, 2004; Label: Epitaph	171	—	—	—	—	—	246	—	190
No Heroes	Released: October 24, 2006; Label: Epitaph	151	—	—	—	—	—	155	—	186
Axe to Fall	Released: October 20, 2009; Label: Epitaph	74	12	33	—	—	—	106	—	196
All We Love We Leave Behind	Released: October 9, 2012; Label: Epitaph	70	9	32	—	—	—	126	—	186
The Dusk in Us	Released: November 3, 2017; Label: Epitaph	60	1	6	79	136	79	—	75	100
Bloodmoon: I (with Chelsea Wolfe)	Released: November 19, 2021; Label: Epitaph	—	—	—	—	—	59	—	—	—
Love Is Not Enough	Released: February 13, 2026; Label: Epitaph	—	—	—	—	192	—	—	—	—
Hum of Hurt	Released: June 5, 2026; Label: Epitaph	—	—	—	—	78	—	—	—	—
"—" denotes a recording that did not chart or was not released in that territory.

=== Live albums ===
Title	Album details
Jane Live	Released: March 3, 2017; Label: Deathwish
Live in Orlando, FL 03.14.22	Released: October 4, 2024
Live at CBGBs	Released: June 13, 2025; Split with Coalesce

=== Compilation albums ===
Title	Album details
Caring and Killing	Released: Late 1995; Label: Lost and Found
Unloved and Weeded Out	Released: January 28, 2003; Label: Deathwish
Petitioning Forever	Released: July 25, 2006; Label: Deathwish

=== Video albums ===
Title	Album details
The Long Road Home	Released: February 25, 2003; Label: Deathwish
Thousands of Miles Between Us	Released: November 27, 2015; Label: Deathwish

=== Split albums ===
Title	Album details
The Poacher Diaries	Released: November 23, 1999; Label: Relapse; Split with: Agoraphobic Nosebleed
Deeper the Wound	Released: April 23, 2001; Label: Deathwish; Split with: Hellchild

== Extended plays ==
Title	Album details
Unloved and Weeded Out	Released: Mid 1995; Label: Orionquest/Heliotrope
Petitioning the Empty Sky	Released: Early 1996; Label: Ferret
Y2K EP	Released: 1999; Label: Equal Vision
Pound for Pound: The Wolverine Blues Sessions	Released: May 23, 2013; Label: Self-released
Live at the BBC	Released: March 10, 2014; Label: Deathwish
Beautiful Ruin	Released: June 29, 2018; Label: Deathwish, Epitaph
The Poacher Diaries Redux	Released: March 18, 2022; Label: Self-released

=== Split EPs ===
Title	Album details
Among the Dead We Pray for Light	Released: 1997; Label: Edison; Split with: Coalesce
Converge / Dropdead	Released: June 21, 2011; Label: Self-released (CONCULT02); Split with: Dropdead
Converge / Napalm Death	Released: August 1, 2012; Label: Self-released (CONCULT03); Split with: Napalm Death

=== Demos ===
Title	Album details
Gravel	Released: Early 1991; Label: Self-released
Converge	Released: Mid 1991; Label: FAR, Exchange
Where Have All the Flowers Gone	Released: Mid 1992; Label: Self-released
Dog Days	Released: Early 1993; Label: Self-released
Jane Doe Demos	Released: Mid 2000; Label: Self-released

== Singles ==
Title	Album details
"Downpour"/"Serial Killer"	Released: 1997; Label: Ellington
"On My Shield"	Released: July 2010; Label: Self-released (CONCULT01)
"I Can Tell You About Pain"	Released: July 25, 2017; Label: Epitaph / Deathwish

== Music videos ==
Year	Song	Director	Album
2003	"Concubine"/"Fault and Fracture"	Zach Merck	Jane Doe
2005	"Eagles Become Vultures"	Zach Merck	You Fail Me
2006	"No Heroes"	Ryan Zunkley	No Heroes
2009	"Axe to Fall"	Craig Murray	Axe to Fall
2012	"Aimless Arrow"	Max Moore	All We Love We Leave Behind
2014	"Precipice" / "All We Love We Leave Behind"	Craig Murray	All We Love We Leave Behind
2017	"I Can Tell You About Pain"	Tony Wolski	The Dusk in Us
2017	"A Single Tear"	Max Moore	The Dusk in Us
2018	"Melancholia"	Tony Wolski	Beautiful Ruin
2021	"Blood Moon"	Emily Birds	Bloodmoon: I (with Chelsea Wolfe)
2025	"Love Is Not Enough"	George Gallardo Kattah	Love Is Not Enough
2026	"Doom in Bloom"	George Gallardo Kattah	Hum of Hurt
2026	"It Used to Matter"	Morgan Tedd	Hum of Hurt

== Other appearances ==
Song	Year	Album	Comments
"Savior Salvation"	1992	In Our Blood	Later released on Caring and Killing.
"Zodiac"	1993	Boston is Burning	Later released on Caring and Killing.
"Divinity"	1993	Over The Edge	Later released on Caring and Killing.
"Sky"	1993	Soundtrack to the Revolution	Later released on Caring and Killing.
"Blind"	1994	East Coast Assault	Later released on Caring and Killing.
"Flowers and Razorwire"	1995	They Came from Massachusetts	Later released on Unloved and Weeded Out.
"Snowblind"	1997	In These Black Days Vol. 2	Cover of a Black Sabbath song. Later released on the Y2K EP.
"Disintegration"	1999	Disintegrated: A Tribute to The Cure	Cover of the Cure song. Later released on the Y2K EP.
"Annihilate This Week"	2002	Black on Black: A Tribute to Black Flag	Cover of a Black Flag song.
"Whatever I Do"	2003	Tomorrow Seems So Hopeless: A Tribute To Negative Approach	Cover of a Negative Approach song.
"I Won't Let You Go"	2020	Cyberpunk 2077 soundtrack	Credited in-game as Shattered Void

== See also ==
- Epitaph Records discography
- Deathwish Inc. discography
