= Endless Arrow =

Single by Converge
- Released: March 19, 2020
- Studio: God City Studio
- Genre: Ambient
- Length: 31:18
- Songwriters: Jacob Bannon; Kurt Ballou; Nate Newton; Ben Koller
- Producer: Kurt Ballou

Converge singles chronology
"I Can Tell You About Pain" (2017)	"Endless Arrow" (2020)	"I Won't Let You Go" (2020)

"Endless Arrow" is a song by the American hardcore punk band Converge. The more-than-30-minute-long song was self-released digitally on March 19, 2020 as a pay what you want download.

"Endless Arrow" is an extended ambient/experimental remix of the song "Aimless Arrow", the opening track from Converge's 2012 studio album All We Love We Leave Behind. The original track was just under three-minutes long and written by all members of Converge, but "Endless Arrow" was entirely remixed and created by guitarist Kurt Ballou at his own God City Studio. The band has said they created and released the track "to keep people entertained" during the initial United States lockdowns of the COVID-19 pandemic.

Music journalists generally noted the song's drastic departure from Converge's typical musical style and track length. Jon Hadusek of Consequence of Sound described the track as "a half hour of experimental noise and dark, lingering atmospherics. It's a distant echo of the original song's arrangement." Tom Breihan of Stereogum said, "The original track was two minutes as 39 seconds long. And now Kurt Ballou — who is also, it's worth mentioning, probably the most sought-after producer in all of heavy music — has taken that sprint of a track and stretched it into an ambient doom odyssey." Axl Rosenberg of MetalSucks said, "If you listen very, very closely, you can still hear the original track in there. But yeah they ain't kiddin' when they describe 'Endless Arrow' as 'ambient/expermiental.' This shit makes Bloody Panda sound like DragonForce."

== Track listing ==
1. "Endless Arrow" – 31:18
