= I Won't Let You Go =

I Won't Let You Go may refer to:

- "I Won't Let You Go" (Agnetha Fältskog song), 1985
- "I Won't Let You Go" (James Morrison song), 2011
- "I Won't Let You Go" (Converge song), 2020
- "I Won't Let You Go", a 1977 song by Jackie Trent and Tony Hatch
- "I Won't Let You Go", a 1965 song by Kathy Kirby
- "I Won't Let You Go", a 1972 song by The Three Degrees, 1972
- "I Won't Let You Go", a 1980 song by Ray Charles
- "I Won't Let You Go", a 2016 song by Switchfoot
