= Thousands of Miles Between Us =

- Artwork by Ashley Rose Couture.

Live album / Video album by Converge
- Released: November 27, 2015
- Recorded: November 2012
- Length: 1:10:00 (disc one)
- Label: Deathwish

Converge chronology
All We Love We Leave Behind (2012)	Thousands of Miles Between Us (2015)	The Dusk in Us (2017)

Thousands of Miles Between Us is a live album and video by American metalcore band Converge. It was released on November 27, 2015, through Deathwish Inc. record label. The Blu-Ray set was described by Deathwish as "the long-awaited sequel to their 2003 DVD, The Long Road Home."

== Background ==
In October 2015 Deathwish's YouTube channel released a preview for the album/video. The trailer contained two songs from the album/video; "Concubine" and "Dark Horse". Noisey writer John Hill described the preview as "[doing] a good job of showing the diversity of Converge's catalogue. The classic "Concubine" is a killer start to the live album, showing the rawness of the band's earlier work updated a little with the live performance. It then leads into a newer cut, "Dark Horse" which sounds even crisper than it did in 2009." On November 14 the video was screened at midnight in Brookline. Thousands of Miles Between Us was released as a digital download, three-disc Blu-Ray collection, and a limited box set that includes a double LP and a 160-page booklet.

The footage ranges from a full 20 song Converge set to over 15 hours of live, rare, and previously unseen footage, which is claimed to span over a decade in the life of Converge. Disc one contains a full 20 song set from the band's Union Transfer (Philadelphia, PA) show during the All We Love We Leave Behind tour. Disc two and three collectively show over 15 hours of live, rare, and previously unseen footage spanning over a decade of the band, chronologically presented over two Blu-ray discs. The collection features international live performances, interviews, features, music videos, covers, and more.

== Track listing ==
=== Disc one ===
1. "Concubine" (Live) - 01:27
2. "Dark Horse" (Live) - 03:17
3. "Heartless" (Live) - 02:50
4. "Aimless Arrow" (Live) - 03:02
5. "Trespasses" (Live) - 02:40
6. "Bitter and Then Some" (Live) - 01:26
7. "All We Love We Leave Behind" (Live) - 03:57
8. "Sadness Comes Home" (Live) - 04:12
9. "My Unsaid Everything" (Live) - 03:17
10. "Glacial Pace" (Live) - 04:13
11. "Cutter" (Live) - 01:39
12. "Worms Will Feed" (Live) - 07:15
13. "Tender Abuse" (Live) - 01:22
14. "On My Shield" (Live) - 04:12
15. "Axe To Fall" (Live) - 03:18
16. "Empty On The Inside" (Live) - 02:35
17. "Eagles Become Vultures" (Live) - 02:22
18. "The Broken Vow" (Live) - 02:14
19. "You Fail Me" (Live) - 07:31
20. "The Saddest Day" (Live) - 07:40

== Personnel ==
Production and recording

- Alan Douches – mastering at West West Side Music
- Kurt Ballou – mixing at Godcity Recording Studio
- Jimmy Hubbard – film technician, editing

Artwork

- Thomas Hooper – artwork
