= Smear Campaign (album) =

Studio album by Napalm Death
- Released: 15 September 2006
- Recorded: 18–27 May 2006 and 3–10 June 2006
- Studios: Foel Studios, Llanfair Caereinion
- Genre: Deathgrind
- Length: 45:09; 54:34 (vinyl and digipak CD)
- Label: Century Media
- Producer: Russ Russell

Napalm Death chronology
The Code Is Red...Long Live the Code (2005)	Smear Campaign (2006)	Time Waits for No Slave (2009)

Professional ratings
Review scores
Source	Rating
Allmusic	3.5/5 stars
Blabbermouth	9.5/10
Chronicles of Chaos	9/10
Collector's Guide to Heavy Metal	9/10
The Encyclopedia of Popular Music	3/5 stars
The Metal Forge	9/10
Sea of Tranquility	3/5 stars

Smear Campaign is the twelfth studio album by grindcore band Napalm Death. It was recorded with producer Russ Russell at Foel Studios, Wales, and was released on 15 September 2006. It was released as a regular CD, and as a digipak edition featuring two bonus tracks and a sticker of the cover artwork. Differently coloured versions of the cover art exist.

Shortly before the release, Barney Greenway mentioned that the album features a guest appearance by Anneke van Giersbergen, ex-vocalist for the Dutch rock band The Gathering, saying, "[She] has offered up a few parts to a track, which I've yet to hear. But before some people recoil in horror about Napalm going operatic rock or whatever, this was done for good effect and relevance to the track. It will work. It will rock. I'm sure. And we're grateful to Anneke (who is an awesome vocalist in her own right) in advance for giving it a stab."

Smear Campaign is a concept album criticising religion in general.

== Track listing ==
No.	Title	Lyrics	Music	Length
1.	"Weltschmerz"	Greenway	Harris	1:27
2.	"Sink Fast, Let Go"	Greenway	Mitch Harris	3:22
3.	"Fatalist"	Greenway	Embury	2:50
4.	"Puritanical Punishment Beating"	Greenway	Harris	3:25
5.	"When All Is Said and Done"	Embury	Embury	3:00
6.	"Freedom Is the Wage of Sin"	Greenway	Harris	3:08
7.	"In Deference"	Greenway	Harris	3:13
8.	"Short-Lived"	Greenway	Embury	3:05
9.	"Identity Crisis"	Greenway	Harris	2:43
10.	"Shattered Existence"	Embury	Embury	3:10
11.	"Eyes Right Out"	Greenway	Harris	3:13
12.	"Call That an Option? (vinyl and digipak CD limited editions bonus track)"	Greenway	Embury	3:02
13.	"Warped Beyond Logic"	Greenway	Embury	1:59
14.	"Rabid Wolves (For Christ)"	Greenway	Embury	1:23
15.	"Deaf and Dumbstruck (Intelligent Design)"	Greenway	Harris	2:45
16.	"Persona Non Grata"	Greenway	Embury	2:46
17.	"Smear Campaign"	Greenway	Embury	2:47
18.	"Atheist Runt (vinyl and digipak CD limited editions bonus track)"	Greenway	Embury	6:43
Total length:				54:34

== Personnel ==
=== Napalm Death ===
- Mark "Barney" Greenway – lead vocals
- Shane Embury – bass, backing vocals
- Mitch Harris – guitars, backing vocals
- Danny Herrera – drums

=== Additional personnel ===
- Anneke van Giersbergen – additional vocals (1, 7)
- Russ Russell – production, engineering, recording, mixing
- Chris Fielding – assistant engineering
- Mick Kenney – album art
- Kevin Estrada – band photo

== Chart positions ==
Chart (2006)	Peak position
French Albums (SNEP)	158
