= The Code Is Red...Long Live the Code =

Studio album by Napalm Death
- Released: 25 April 2005
- Recorded: 21 September – 13 October 2004
- Studios: Foel Studios, Llanfair Caereinion, Wales
- Genre: Deathgrind
- Length: 45:12
- Label: Century Media
- Producer: Russ Russell

Napalm Death chronology
Leaders Not Followers: Part 2 (2004)	The Code Is Red...Long Live the Code (2005)	Smear Campaign (2006)

Professional ratings
Review scores
Source	Rating
AllMusic	3.5/5 stars
Chronicles of Chaos	9.5/10
Collector's Guide to Heavy Metal	7/10
The Encyclopedia of Popular Music	2/5 stars
Hybrid	Favourable
The Metal Forge	9/10
musicOMH	Favourable
PopMatters	8/10
Sea of Tranquility	3.5/5 stars
Transform Online	Favourable

The Code Is Red...Long Live the Code is Napalm Death's eleventh studio album and was recorded at Foel Studio, Llanfair Caereinion, with producer Russ Russell. It was released on 25 April 2005. A music video for "Silence Is Deafening", directed by Roger Johansson, was released later that year.

Some editions of the album were released with a bonus disc that contains material from a variety of death metal bands, such as Aborted. The Napalm Death song "Silence Is Deafening" is the first track on the compilation.

The album features guest appearances by Jello Biafra of Dead Kennedys, Jamey Jasta of Hatebreed, and Jeffrey Walker of Carcass.

In 2017, Decibel released a special magazine issue relating to the 30th Anniversary of Napalm Death. This issue included a Decibel Magazine Hall of Fame induction for The Code Is Red... Long Live the Code.

== Track listing ==
All lyrics are written by Mark Greenway.

No.	Title	Music	Length
1.	"Silence is Deafening"	Shane Embury	3:48
2.	"Right You Are"	Embury	0:52
3.	"Diplomatic Immunity"	Embury	1:45
4.	"The Code Is Red...Long Live the Code"	Mitch Harris	3:30
5.	"Climate Controllers"	Harris	3:06
6.	"Instruments of Persuasion"	Harris	2:59
7.	"The Great and the Good"	Embury	4:10
8.	"Sold Short"	Harris, Embury	2:47
9.	"All Hail the Grey Dawn"	Embury	4:13
10.	"Vegetative State"	Harris	3:08
11.	"Pay for the Privilege of Breathing"	Embury	1:46
12.	"Pledge Yourself to You"	Harris	3:14
13.	"Striding Purposefully Backwards"	Harris	2:53
14.	"Morale"	Embury	4:44
15.	"Our Pain Is Their Power"	Embury, Harris, Russ Russell	2:10
Total length:			45:12

== Personnel ==
=== Napalm Death ===
- Mark "Barney" Greenway – lead vocals
- Mitch Harris – lead guitar, backing vocals
- Shane Embury – bass, backing vocals, rhythm guitar (14)
- Danny Herrera – drums

=== Additional musicians ===
- Jello Biafra – vocals (7)
- Jamey Jasta – vocals (6, 8)
- Jeffrey Walker – vocals (12)

=== Technical personnel ===
- Russ Russell – production, recording, mixing, mastering
- Dave Anderson – assistant production, assistant recording, assistant mixing
- Winter – recording (7), engineering (7)
- Billy Gould – assistant recording (7), assistant engineering (7)
- Mitch Harris – video direction, video editing
