= Converge / Dropdead =

EP by Converge and Dropdead
- Released: June 16, 2011
- Recorded: Early 2011
- Genre: Hardcore punk; metalcore
- Length: 4:15
- Label: Self-released (CONCULT02)
- Producer: Kurt Ballou/Dropdead

Converge chronology
Axe to Fall (2009)	Converge / Dropdead (2011)	Converge / Napalm Death (2012)

Dropdead chronology
Dropdead / Look Back And Laugh (2004)	Converge / Dropdead (2011)	Dropdead/Ruidosa Inmundicia (2013)

Converge / Dropdead is a split EP by American bands Converge and Dropdead. The single was self-released commercially in digital and 7" vinyl formats by both of the bands on June 16, 2011, and was distributed through Deathwish Inc. and Armageddon. Copies were also available during Converge and Dropdead's May/June 2011 tour with Trap Them and Burning Love.

== Track listing ==
Side A: Converge

1. "Runaway" – 2:05

Side B: Dropdead

1. "Paths of Glory" – 1:38

== Personnel ==
Converge

- Kurt Ballou – guitars
- Jacob Bannon – vocals
- Ben Koller – drum kit
- Nate Newton – bass guitar

Dropdead

- Ben Barnett – guitar
- Devon Cahill – bass
- Brian Mastrobuono – drums
- Bob Otis – vocals

Production and artwork

- Kurt Ballou – production on "Runaway" at Godcity in early 2011, co-production on "Paths of Glory" at Godcity from 2004 to 2011
- Dropdead – co-production on "Paths of Glory"
- John Golden – mastering
- Jacob Bannon – artwork
