= All We Love We Leave Behind =

Studio album by Converge
- Released: October 8, 2012
- Recorded: February 2012
- Studio: GodCity, Salem, Massachusetts
- Genre: Mathcore; heavy metal; hardcore punk; post-hardcore; grindcore
- Length: 38:32
- Label: Epitaph
- Producer: Kurt Ballou

Converge chronology
Axe to Fall (2009)	All We Love We Leave Behind (2012)	Thousands of Miles Between Us (2015)

All We Love We Leave Behind is the eighth studio album by American metalcore band Converge. It was released on October 8, 2012, via Epitaph Records. The album did not feature any guest collaborators, unlike the band's previous album Axe to Fall. The album was produced by Converge guitarist Kurt Ballou and the artwork was created by the band's singer Jacob Bannon.

All We Love We Leave Behind peaked at number 70 on Billboard 200 chart in the United States, it was the band's most commercially successful record until their next album, The Dusk in Us reached number 60 on the same chart in 2017.

== Writing and recording ==
On January 1, 2012, Converge announced that they had completed writing for the album. The following day, Kurt Ballou announced plans via his Facebook page to begin recording with the band in January 2012. The album was recorded and mixed at Kurt Ballou's GodCity Studio in Salem, Massachusetts. Unlike the band's last few albums, All We Love We Leave Behind did not feature collaborators. The album's sound has been described as "raw" and "live-sounding". The album was mastered by Alan Douches, noted for former contributions to Converge recordings as well as mastering for bands such as Death, The Dillinger Escape Plan and Japandroids. Former Give Up the Ghost drummer Alex Garcia-Rivera was brought in as a drum technician.

== Release and promotion ==
All We Love We Leave Behind was first announced on August 28, 2012. On that same day, a Max Moore directed music video for the track "Aimless Arrow" was released. On October 3, 2012, the album was available to stream in its entirety on YouTube, a week before its official release. On April 17, 2014, a second music video was released for the album, "Precipice / All We Love We Leave Behind", making it the first Converge album to have more than one music video. All We Love We Leave Behind was released through Epitaph Records on October 8, 2012 (Europe) and October 9, 2012 (USA), in digital and CD formats. The vinyl edition of the album was released through Jacob Bannon's own independent record label, Deathwish Inc. The deluxe edition came with three additional tracks: "On My Shield," which was originally released as a single; "Runaway," which was originally released on the Dropdead split; and "No Light Escapes," which was originally released on the Napalm Death split. The deluxe edition featured a hardcover 48-page book that included art drawn by vocalist Jacob Bannon. The band made an appearance at Los Angeles’ FYF Fest on September 1, 2012. Then after a short break the band began touring for support of the album on October 12, 2012, the band toured the US with Torche, Kvelertak, Nails and Whips/Chains.

== Musical style and themes ==
Bannon said "All of our albums are emotional but I feel this is our most potent album to date," Bannon continues. "For me songs like 'Predatory Glow' and ‘Empty on the Inside’ have a tone and resonance that communicates in a new way for our band," he adds, chalking up this ability to the fact that the group have become better songwriters by spending so much time on the road and in the studio perfecting their craft. "Success to me is creating something that's moving and fulfilling and I truly feel both of those things when I experience this album from start to finish".

Converge wanted All We Love We Leave Behind to sound more "organic" compared to their previous releases. This means there is no artificial distortion, triggers, or Auto-Tune on the album. Ballou explains, "it's all organic, it’s real sounds that capture the way the band performs live".

Lyrically, Bannon approached All We Love We Leave Behind by once again writing about his own personal experiences, but this time around his vocals were more direct and decipherable than in the past. "This is a personal record and all of the songs tell their own stories," Bannon explained. "Every song is rooted in real life, documenting what I have experienced over the past few years." Correspondingly, the title of the album is an apology letter to everything he has had to leave behind to pursue his path in art and music. Bannon explained the importance he placed on acknowledging these sacrifices to be "a self-aware individual". The album's title track is about the death of Bannon's longtime dog, whom he regretted not spending more time with because of his busy touring.

== Reception ==
=== Critical reception ===
Professional ratings
Aggregate scores
Source	Rating
AnyDecentMusic?	8.1/10
Metacritic	88/100
Review scores
Source	Rating
AllMusic	5/5 stars
The A.V. Club	B+
Chicago Tribune	3.5/4 stars
Consequence of Sound	4.5/5 stars
Kerrang!	5/5 stars
Loudwire	4.5/5 stars
NME	6/10
Pitchfork	8.6/10
Q	4/5 stars
Spin	8/10

All We Love We Leave Behind was met with widespread acclaim from music critics. At Metacritic, which assigns a normalized rating out of 100 to reviews from mainstream critics, the album received an average score of 88, based on 19 reviews, which indicates "universal acclaim". Brandon Stosuy of Pitchfork Media gave the album a Best New Music designation, writing "There's never a dull moment across AWLWLB's 38 minutes. It's all peaks." Stosuy continued: "AWLWLB is an example of building on and mastering the music you loved when you were younger-- something that became more than music, ultimately-- so that it has a chance to grow old with you without becoming any less vital". Sputnikmusic also praised the album, writing "All We Love We Leave Behind is yet another successful achievement to add to Converge’s lauded canon. It lacks the novelty to reach the heights of some of its earliest predecessors, but it continues to drive nails into the coffins of competing hardcore/metal bands." David von Bader of Consequence of Sound called All We Love We Leave Behind "[..] yet another glowing example of how to make art out of aggression", while Tiny Mix Tapes described the album as one that "entices kinetic release in every possible way, irrational and otherwise, allowing unchecked ventilation as means for escape through a medium that has never sounded so engaging". The A.V. Club's Jason Heller wrote that while the album lacked cohesion in some spots, the album "solidifies Converge’s position as one of hardcore’s most progressive yet soulful stalwarts".

NME's John Calvert, on the other hand, was more mixed to the album, writing "[...] [B]y trading nonsensical time signatures and atonal bursts for fluidity and stadium rock, they’ve subtracted from their former wretchedness".

All We Love We Leave Behind was named the best album of 2012 by Decibel, while Pitchfork Media ranked the album No. 2 on its list of the 40 best metal albums of 2012. The album was also listed 40th on Stereogum's list of top 50 albums of 2012. Metacritic ranked All We Love We Leave Behind at number 5 on its "25 best-reviewed albums of 2012" list and number 27 "critics pick the best albums of 2012" list.

=== Charts ===
It peaked at number 70 on the Billboard 200, which was the band's highest chart performance until The Dusk in Us was released in 2017.

== Track listing ==
All lyrics written by Jacob Bannon, all music composed by Converge.

No.	Title	Length
1.	"Aimless Arrow"	2:23
2.	"Trespasses"	2:43
3.	"Tender Abuse"	1:25
4.	"Sadness Comes Home"	3:12
5.	"Empty on the Inside"	2:29
6.	"Sparrow's Fall"	1:27
7.	"Glacial Pace"	4:25
8.	"Vicious Muse"	1:52
9.	"Veins and Veils"	2:32
10.	"Coral Blue"	4:48
11.	"Shame in the Way"	1:57
12.	"Precipice"	1:47
13.	"All We Love We Leave Behind"	4:07
14.	"Predatory Glow"	3:25
Total length:		38:32

Deluxe edition
No.	Title	Length
1.	"Aimless Arrow"	2:23
2.	"Trespasses"	2:43
3.	"Tender Abuse"	1:25
4.	"Sadness Comes Home"	3:12
5.	"Empty on the Inside"	2:29
6.	"Sparrow's Fall"	1:27
7.	"Glacial Pace"	4:25
8.	"No Light Escapes" (bonus track)	0:51
9.	"Vicious Muse"	1:52
10.	"Veins and Veils"	2:32
11.	"Coral Blue"	4:48
12.	"Shame in the Way"	1:57
13.	"On My Shield" (bonus track)	4:14
14.	"Precipice"	1:47
15.	"All We Love We Leave Behind"	4:07
16.	"Runaway" (bonus track)	2:03
17.	"Predatory Glow"	3:25
Total length:		45:40

== Personnel ==
The following people contributed to All We Love We Leave Behind:

Converge

- Jacob Bannon – vocals, lyrics
- Kurt Ballou – guitars, vocals, keyboards, percussion
- Nate Newton – bass, vocals
- Ben Koller – drums, percussion, vocals

Recording personnel

- Kurt Ballou – producer, engineer, mixing at GodCity
- Alan Douches – mastering
- Alex Garcia-Rivera – drum technician

Artwork and design

- Jacob Bannon – artwork, design and illustrations

== Chart performance ==
Chart	Peak position
Japanese Albums Chart	126
UK Albums Chart	186
US Billboard 200	70
US Billboard Independent Albums	16
US Billboard Hard Rock Albums	9
US Billboard Rock Albums	32
US Billboard Tastemakers Albums	13
