= Time Waits for No Slave =

Studio album by Napalm Death
- Released: 23 January 2009
- Recorded: August–October 2008
- Studio: Foel Studios, Llanfair Caereinion; Parlour Studios, Kettering
- Genre: Deathgrind
- Length: 50:20
- Label: Century Media
- Producer: Russ Russell, Napalm Death

Napalm Death chronology
Smear Campaign (2006)	Time Waits for No Slave (2009)	Utilitarian (2012)

Time Waits for No Slave is the thirteenth studio album by the British grindcore band Napalm Death. It was released through Century Media on 23 January 2009.

Professional ratings
Review scores
Source	Rating
AllMusic	3.5/5 stars
The Aquarian Weekly	A
Blabbermouth.net	9.5/10
Brave Words & Bloody Knuckles	10/10
Chronicles of Chaos	10/10
The Metal Forge	8.5/10
MetalReviews	89/100
The Quietus	Favourable
The Washington Post	Favourable

== Track listing ==
No.	Title	Lyrics	Music	Length
1.	"Strong-Arm"	Mark Greenway	Shane Embury	3:04
2.	"Diktat"	Greenway	Mitch Harris	3:41
3.	"Work to Rule"	Greenway	Embury	3:17
4.	"On the Brink of Extinction"	Embury	Embury	3:30
5.	"Time Waits for No Slave"	Greenway	Harris	4:27
6.	"Life and Limb"	Harris	Harris	4:01
7.	"Downbeat Clique"	Greenway	Harris	4:26
8.	"Fallacy Dominion"	Harris, Greenway	Harris	4:07
9.	"Passive Tense"	Greenway	Harris	3:49
10.	"Larceny of the Heart"	Embury	Embury	3:36
11.	"Procrastination on the Empty Vessel"	Greenway	Embury	2:57
12.	"Feeling Redundant"	Greenway	Embury	3:23
13.	"A No-Sided Argument"	Greenway	Embury	2:14
14.	"De-Evolution ad Nauseum"	Greenway	Harris	3:49
Total length:				50:20

Digipak CD bonus tracks
No.	Title	Lyrics	Music	Length
15.	"Suppressed Hunger"	Greenway	Embury	3:09
16.	"Omnipresent Knife in Your Back"	Greenway	Embury	5:41

Japanese edition bonus tracks
No.	Title	Lyrics	Music	Length
15.	"Suppressed Hunger"	Greenway	Embury	3:09
16.	"We Hunt in Packs"	Greenway	Harris	3:49
17.	"Omnipresent Knife in Your Back"	Greenway	Embury	5:41

== Personnel ==
=== Napalm Death ===
- Mark "Barney" Greenway – lead vocals
- Mitch Harris – guitars, backing vocals
- Shane Embury – bass, backing vocals
- Danny Herrera – drums

=== Production ===
- Napalm Death – arrangement, producer
- Russ Russell – producer, engineering, mixing, mastering
- Mick Kenney – outside illustration
- Kevin Sharp – inside illustration
- Carsten Drescher – layout
- Hugo Chevalier – band photo (Herrera)
- ccphotoart.biz – band photos (other band members)

== Chart positions ==
Chart (2009)	Peak position
French Albums (SNEP)	178
German Albums (Offizielle Top 100)	95
US Heatseekers Albums (Billboard)	19
