= Beautiful Ruin =

EP by Converge
- Released: June 29, 2018
- Studio: GodCity, Salem, Massachusetts
- Genre: Extreme metal; metalcore; heavy hardcore; avant-garde metal
- Length: 6:43
- Label: Epitaph; Deathwish
- Producer: Kurt Ballou

Converge chronology
| The Dusk in Us (2017) | Beautiful Ruin (2018) | Bloodmoon I (2021) |

Beautiful Ruin is an EP by American metalcore band Converge. it was released on June 29, 2018, via Epitaph and Deathwish. It consists of four tracks that were recorded during the sessions for The Dusk in Us. It was produced by Converge guitarist Kurt Ballou and features artwork created by the band's singer Jacob Bannon.

== Background ==
On November 3, 2017, Converge released their ninth album The Dusk in Us. Recorded during the spring of 2017, 18 songs were written and recorded for the album, but only 13 made it onto the album. One of the five non-album tracks, "Eve" was released as a b-side to the album's lead single "I Can Tell You About Pain".

Guitarist Kurt Ballou stated that the band is positive about releasing the remaining four tracks at some point: "We all disagreed about what the strongest songs were, and which songs made for the best record. I think we're all equally unhappy with what ended up on the album. It was a compromise. Some of the songs on that album are actually some of the weakest ones that we recorded, and some of the ones that aren't on the album are the strongest. We're just not exactly sure how we're going to release them yet. Whether it's B-sides, or an EP, we don't know yet."

== Release and promotion ==
On June 28, 2018, the band uploaded a short series of images to their Instagram page, which together assemble the EP's cover art, with the EP's title being alluded to in the hashtags. A day later, on June 29, the EP was officially released via Epitaph and Deathwish, along with a music video for the song "Melancholia", directed by Tony Wolski.

== Track listing ==
| No. | Title | Length |
|---|---|---|
| 1. | "Permanent Blue" | 2:24 |
| 2. | "Churches and Jails" | 1:27 |
| 3. | "Melancholia" | 1:29 |
| 4. | "Beautiful Ruin" | 1:23 |
| Total length: | | 6:43 |

== Personnel ==
*Identical to the credits of The Dusk in Us, considering all the tracks are outtakes from that album.

Converge

- Jacob Bannon – vocals
- Kurt Ballou – guitars, bass, backing vocals
- Nate Newton – bass, guitar, backing vocals
- Ben Koller – drums, percussion

Recording personnel

- Kurt Ballou – producer, engineer, mixing
- Robert Cheeseman – assistant engineer
- Alex Garcia-Rivera – drum tech
- Alan Douches – mastering

Artwork and design

- Jacob Bannon – artwork, design and illustrations
