= Utilitarian (album) =

Studio album by Napalm Death
- Released: 27 February 2012
- Recorded: May–November 2011
- Studio: Parlour (Kettering)
- Genre: Deathgrind
- Length: 45:20
- Label: Century Media
- Producer: Russ Russell

Napalm Death chronology
Time Waits for No Slave (2009)	Utilitarian (2012)	Converge / Napalm Death (2012)

Singles from Utilitarian
- 1. "Analysis Paralysis" Released: 2 January 2012

Utilitarian is the fourteenth studio album by British grindcore band Napalm Death. It was released in the UK on 27 February 2012 and globally on 28 February 2012.

The magazine Loudwire named it as second best metal album of 2012. Loudwire also put "The Wolf I feed" at the 64 spot on their best metal songs of the 2010s list.

Professional ratings
Aggregate scores
Source	Rating
Metacritic	74/100
Review scores
Source	Rating
About.com	4/5 stars
Allmusic	3.5/5 stars
Blabbermouth.net	8.5/10
The Guardian	Favourable
Metal Forces	8.5/10
MetalReviews	95/100
Metal Sucks	4/5 stars
Popmatters	8/10
Spin	8/10
This Is Not a Scene	9/10

== Background ==
Utilitarian was recorded in 2011. A 7-inch vinyl single for "Analysis Paralysis" was released in January 2012. When asked, vocalist Mark "Barney" Greenway stated that he was quite proud of the new album, saying, "The thing you have to consider about Napalm Death is that no two albums sound the same, which is what makes this album unique. Whilst we stick to the same aggressive tone that fans are used to, we also have added other technical elements in it to make it stand out. It's still a rock album, but it's something we do to it to make it fresh."

When the recording sessions for the then-untitled album had already finished, Napalm Death extended their worldwide contract with Century Media on a number of future albums. According to vocalist Mark Greenway, "it's the first time we've actually re-signed on a longer term deal with anybody since the days when we didn't strictly know that we could be digging ourselves a big hole with labels."

== Track listing ==
No.	Title	Writer(s)	Length
1.	"Circumspect" (Instrumental)		2:17
2.	"Errors in the Signals"	Mark Greenway, Mitch Harris	3:02
3.	"Everyday Pox"	Greenway, Shane Embury	2:12
4.	"Protection Racket"	Greenway, Embury	4:00
5.	"The Wolf I Feed"	Harris	2:57
6.	"Quarantined"	Greenway, Harris	2:47
7.	"Fall on Their Swords"	Greenway, Embury	3:57
8.	"Collision Course"	Embury	3:14
9.	"Orders of Magnitude"	Harris	3:21
10.	"Think Tank Trials"	Greenway, Harris	2:27
11.	"Blank Look About Face"	Greenway, Harris	3:12
12.	"Leper Colony"	Greenway, Embury	3:23
13.	"Nom de Guerre"	Greenway, Embury	1:07
14.	"Analysis Paralysis"	Harris, Embury	3:23
15.	"Opposites Repellent"	Greenway, Embury	1:22
16.	"A Gag Reflex"	Greenway, Harris	3:30

Limited edition CD track listing
No.	Title	Writer(s)	Length
1.	"Circumspect" (Instrumental)		2:17
2.	"Errors in the Signals"	Mark Greenway, Mitch Harris	3:02
3.	"Everyday Pox"	Greenway, Shane Embury	2:12
4.	"Protection Racket"	Greenway, Embury	4:00
5.	"The Wolf I Feed"	Harris	2:57
6.	"Quarantined"	Greenway, Harris	2:47
7.	"Fall on Their Swords"	Greenway, Embury	3:57
8.	"Collision Course"	Embury	3:14
9.	"Orders of Magnitude"	Harris	3:21
10.	"Think Tank Trials"	Greenway, Harris	2:27
11.	"Blank Look About Face"	Greenway, Harris	3:12
12.	"Leper Colony"	Greenway, Embury	3:23
13.	"Aim Without an Aim" (bonus track)	Greenway, Harris	3:06
14.	"Everything in Mono" (bonus track)	Greenway, Harris	2:49
15.	"Nom De Guerre"		1:07
16.	"Analysis Paralysis"		3:23
17.	"Opposites Repellant"		1:22
18.	"A Gag Reflex"		3:30

LP track listing
No.	Title	Writer(s)	Length
1.	"Circumspect" (Instrumental)		2:17
2.	"Errors in the Signals"	Mark Greenway, Mitch Harris	3:02
3.	"Everyday Pox"	Greenway, Shane Embury	2:12
4.	"Protection Racket"	Greenway, Embury	4:00
5.	"The Wolf I Feed"	Harris	2:57
6.	"Quarantined"	Greenway, Harris	2:47
7.	"Fall on Their Swords"	Greenway, Embury	3:57
8.	"Collision Course"	Embury	3:14
9.	"Orders of Magnitude"	Harris	3:21
10.	"Think Tank Trials"	Greenway, Harris	2:27
11.	"Blank Look About Face"	Greenway, Harris	3:12
12.	"Leper Colony"	Greenway, Embury	3:23
13.	"Aim Without an Aim" (bonus track)	Greenway, Harris	3:06
14.	"Everything in Mono" (bonus track)	Greenway, Harris	2:49
15.	"Nom de Guerre"	Greenway, Embury	1:07
16.	"Analysis Paralysis"	Harris, Embury	3:23
17.	"Opposites Repellent"	Greenway, Embury	1:22
18.	"A Gag Reflex"	Greenway, Harris	3:30
19.	"Standardization" (bonus track)		2:45
Total length:			45:20

Japanese track listing
No.	Title	Writer(s)	Length
1.	"Circumspect" (Instrumental)		2:17
2.	"Errors in the Signals"	Mark Greenway, Mitch Harris	3:02
3.	"Everyday Pox"	Greenway, Shane Embury	2:12
4.	"Protection Racket"	Greenway, Embury	4:00
5.	"The Wolf I Feed"	Harris	2:57
6.	"Quarantined"	Greenway, Harris	2:47
7.	"Fall on Their Swords"	Greenway, Embury	3:57
8.	"Collision Course"	Embury	3:14
9.	"Orders of Magnitude"	Harris	3:21
10.	"Think Tank Trials"	Greenway, Harris	2:27
11.	"Blank Look About Face"	Greenway, Harris	3:12
12.	"Leper Colony"	Greenway, Embury	3:23
13.	"Aim Without an Aim" (bonus track)	Greenway, Harris	3:06
14.	"Everything in Mono" (bonus track)	Greenway, Harris	2:49
15.	"Nom de Guerre"	Greenway, Embury	1:07
16.	"Analysis Paralysis"	Harris, Embury	3:23
17.	"Opposites Repellent"	Greenway, Embury	1:22
18.	"A Gag Reflex"	Greenway, Harris	3:30
19.	"It Failed to Explode" (bonus track)		3:39

== Personnel ==
=== Napalm Death ===
- Barney Greenway – lead vocals
- Mitch Harris – guitars, backing vocals
- Shane Embury – bass
- Danny Herrera – drums

=== Additional personnel ===
- John Zorn – saxophone ("Everyday Pox")
- Russ Russell – production, mixing, engineering, recording, mastering
- Marc Urselli – engineering ("Everyday Pox")
- Frode Sylthe – artwork, layout
- Cindy Frey – band photos

== Chart positions ==
Chart (2012)	Peak position
Belgian Albums (Ultratop Wallonia)	84
Finnish Albums (Suomen virallinen lista)	25
French Albums (SNEP)	80
German Albums (Offizielle Top 100)	74
Swiss Albums (Schweizer Hitparade)	88
US Top Hard Rock Albums (Billboard)	22
US Heatseekers Albums (Billboard)	14
US Independent Albums (Billboard)	43
US Indie Store Album Sales (Billboard)	25
