= Hum of Hurt =

Studio album by Converge
- Released: June 5, 2026
- Studio: God City
- Genres: Metalcore; hardcore punk; post-metal
- Length: 33:34
- Labels: Epitaph; Deathwish
- Producer: Converge

Converge chronology
Love Is Not Enough (2026)	Hum of Hurt (2026)

Singles from Hum of Hurt
- 1. "Hum of Hurt" Released: April 1, 2026; 2. "Doom in Bloom" Released: May 5, 2026

Professional ratings
Review scores
Source	Rating
Kerrang!	4/5
Lambgoat	7/10
New Noise Magazine	Positive
Pitchfork	7.6/10
Sputnikmusic	4.4/5

Hum of Hurt is the twelfth studio album by the American metalcore band Converge, released on June 5, 2026, via Epitaph Records and Deathwish Inc. It is the second album that the band released in 2026, following Love Is Not Enough four months earlier.

== Background ==
On April 1, Converge surprise-released the title track as the lead single while announcing the upcoming release of the album in June, taking many by shock as the band had just released the album Love Is Not Enough in February. The band wanted to write a noise rock album, but neither of their 2026 releases ended up going down that direction; Jacob Bannon said that Hum of Hurt had more of the "spirit" of that early vision.

Kurt Ballou enjoyed keeping the second album a secret and preferred the idea of releasing two shorter albums instead of one long one, believing that listeners nowadays do not have the patience for a double album. "There was a final sprint during the last round of writing where a lot more stuff got finished than we were expecting. We had to decide what to do with all this material," Ballou said.

The album's title references the hum of the Earth, which Bannon suggests represents "the culmination of all the pain in the world, creating an audible signal across the universe." The title track was written about self-examination, "recognizing that I am not the man I want to be," he said.

== Track listing ==
All lyrics are written by Jacob Bannon; all music is composed by Bannon, Kurt Ballou, Ben Koller, and Nate Newton.

Hum of Hurt track listing
No.	Title	Length
1.	"Slip the Noose"	1:44
2.	"Doom in Bloom"	3:17
3.	"It Only Gets Worse"	2:13
4.	"Detonator"	3:37
5.	"I Won't Let You Go"	2:57
6.	"It's Not Up to Us"	2:43
7.	"Dream Debris"	6:01
8.	"It Used to Matter"	2:31
9.	"Hum of Hurt"	3:35
10.	"Nothing Is Over"	4:56
Total length:		33:34

== Personnel ==
Credits adapted from Bandcamp and Tidal.

=== Converge ===
- Jacob Bannon – vocals, production
- Kurt Ballou – guitars, vocals, production, recording, mixing
- Nate Newton – bass, vocals, production
- Ben Koller – percussion, production

=== Additional contributors ===
- Zach Weeks – engineering assistance
- Alan Douches – mastering

== Charts ==
Chart performance for Hum of Hurt
Chart (2026)	Peak position
Belgian Albums (Ultratop Flanders)	78
Belgian Albums (Ultratop Wallonia)	198
French Physical Albums (SNEP)	122
French Rock & Metal Albums (SNEP)	35
German Albums (Offizielle Top 100)	53
German Rock & Metal Albums (Offizielle Top 100)	14
Scottish Albums (Official Charts)	40
UK Albums Sales (OCC)	85
UK Rock & Metal Albums (Official Charts)	12
UK Independent Albums (Official Charts)	32
