= I Won't Let You Go (Converge song) =

Single by Shattered Void (Converge)

from the album Cyberpunk 2077: Radio, Vol. 1
- Released: December 11, 2020
- Length: 2:59
- Label: Lakeshore, Epitaph
- Songwriters: Kurt Ballou, Jacob Bannon, Ben Koller, Nate Newton
- Producers: Kurt Ballou, Josh Newell

Converge singles chronology
"Endless Arrow" (2020)	"I Won't Let You Go" (2020)

"I Won't Let You Go" is a song by the American hardcore band Converge. The song first appeared on the soundtrack for the 2020 video game Cyberpunk 2077; it was released as a stand-alone single in 2021; and it was re-recorded for the band's twelfth studio album, Hum of Hurt, in 2026.

== Release history ==
The song "I Won't Let You Go" was originally released as part of the in-game soundtrack to the 2020 video game, Cyberpunk 2077, as well as being released as a part of the Cyberpunk 2077: Radio, Vol. 1 compilation of music recorded for the game. Artists who contributed to the compilation series all released music under a unique pseudonym, and Converge chose to release "I Won't Let You Go" under the name "Shattered Void." The song was publicly released for streaming on December 10, 2020, coinciding with the release date of the game.

This version of the song was also released as a part of Decibel magazine's limited edition flexi disc singles series in June 2021. The single featured original artwork by Converge vocalist Jacob Bannon and the release commemorated Decibel's 200th issue and 10 year anniversary of their flexi disc series.

A re-recorded version of "I Won't Let You Go" was released as a part of Converge's twelfth studio album, Hum of Hurt, in 2026. The band stated they re-recorded the song because they knew they could improve upon the original. Bannon stated in the album's press release, "This version has everything the previous one was missing. It now feels right." In a separate interview, Bannon elaborated that the re-recorded version is, "more in line with what we thought that song could be as an earlier version was released previously."

== Reception ==
Describing the original version, Andrew Sacher of BrooklynVegan said the song was, "a ripper that finds them leaning more into their punk/hardcore side but still with all the chaos you'd expect from a Converge song."

Describing the re-recorded Hum of Hurt version, Alex Robert Ross of Pitchfork said, "the most striking moments come when Bannon sounds exhausted, as he does on the verses to 'Doom in Bloom' and 'I Won't Let You Go,'" comparing his vocals and lyrics to Guy Picciotto of Fugazi. Ross elaborated, "Clearer too is the animating force behind his lyrics, carried forward from hardcore and post-hardcore, that self-improvement is vital and even political. Over and over again, he seems afraid of nothing more than himself and the damage he can do." Writing for New Noise Magazine, Lamar Ramos said of the song, "the verse immediately reminded me of KEN Mode, both in its noise-rock atmosphere and vocal phrasing." Writing for Decibel, Emily Bellino said the song, "enters [Hum of Hurt] as one of the most unique-sounding riffs in the Converge canon."

== Personnel ==
Converge

- Kurt Ballou – guitars
- Jacob Bannon – vocals
- Ben Koller – drums
- Nate Newton – bass

Production and recording

- Kurt Ballou – recording, mixing
- Alan Douches – mastering
- Josh Newell – recording (original 2020 version)
- Zack Weeks – assistant engineering (re-recorded 2026 version)
