= Love Is Not Enough (Converge album) =

Studio album by Converge
- Released: February 13, 2026
- Studio: God City
- Genres: Metalcore, hardcore punk, mathcore, sludge metal
- Length: 31:07
- Labels: Epitaph; Deathwish
- Producer: Kurt Ballou

Converge chronology
Bloodmoon: I (2021)	Love Is Not Enough (2026)	Hum of Hurt (2026)

Singles from Love Is Not Enough
- 1. "Love Is Not Enough" Released: November 19, 2025; 2. "We Were Never The Same" Released: January 13, 2026

Professional ratings
Aggregate scores
Source	Rating
AnyDecentMusic?	8/10
Metacritic	84/100
Review scores
Source	Rating
Amped Magazine	5/5 stars
Blabbermouth.net	9/10
Boolin Tunes	8/10
Clash	9/10
The Guardian	4/5 stars
Kerrang!	5/5
Metal Factory	8/10
Pitchfork	7.4/10
Slant Magazine	3.5/5 stars
Sputnikmusic	4.6/5

Love Is Not Enough is the eleventh studio album by the American metalcore band Converge, released on February 13, 2026, via Epitaph Records and Deathwish Inc. With a 31-minute runtime, it is the band's shortest album to date.

== Background ==
Following the band's last studio album, 2021's Bloodmoon: I with Chelsea Wolfe, Love Is Not Enough showed the band making a stylistic turn to their simpler and heavier roots. Guitarist Kurt Ballou stated, "There are songs on Bloodmoon that I barely played guitar on. Making Love is Not Enough, that goes back to regular Converge, where we are much more comfortable in our roles. The division of labour is well established in the band and it’s back to being focused on our own stuff. But, also, there’s less space to hide. The guitar ideas are mine, and I’m playing them all. There’s a deliberate lack of collaboration on it. Guitar solos are not my thing, but we’re not having guest musicians here. No one’s playing this solo for me, so I gotta fucking do it. So, you know, I did it."

== Track listing ==
All lyrics are written by Jacob Bannon; all music is composed by Bannon, Kurt Ballou, Ben Koller, and Nate Newton.

Love Is Not Enough track listing
No.	Title	Length
1.	"Love Is Not Enough"	2:22
2.	"Bad Faith"	2:48
3.	"Distract and Divide"	1:31
4.	"To Feel Something"	1:58
5.	"Beyond Repair" (Instrumental)	2:29
6.	"Amon Amok"	3:43
7.	"Force Meets Presence"	2:17
8.	"Gilded Cage"	4:48
9.	"Make Me Forget You"	4:58
10.	"We Were Never the Same"	4:13
Total length:		31:07

== Personnel ==
Credits adapted from the album's liner notes and Tidal.

=== Converge ===
- Jacob Bannon – vocals, production, artwork, design
- Kurt Ballou – guitars, vocals, production, recording, mixing
- Nate Newton – bass, vocals, production
- Ben Koller – percussion, production

=== Additional contributors ===
- Alan Douches – mastering
- Zach Weeks – engineering assistance
- Jason Zucco – photography

== Charts ==
Chart performance for Love Is Not Enough
Chart (2026)	Peak position
Belgian Albums (Ultratop Flanders)	192
French Physical Albums (SNEP)	169
French Rock & Metal Albums (SNEP)	22
Scottish Albums (Official Charts)	32
Swiss Albums (Schweizer Hitparade)	46
UK Albums Sales (OCC)	57
UK Independent Albums (Official Charts)	23
UK Rock & Metal Albums (Official Charts)	10
US Top Album Sales (Billboard)	40
