= No Heroes =

Studio album by Converge
- Released: October 23, 2006
- Studios: GodCity, Salem
- Genres: Metalcore; hardcore punk; post-hardcore; sludge metal
- Length: 41:37
- Label: Epitaph
- Producer: Kurt Ballou

Converge chronology
| You Fail Me (2004) | No Heroes (2006) | Axe to Fall (2009) |

No Heroes is the sixth studio album by American metalcore band Converge, released on October 23, 2006, by Epitaph Records. The album was produced by guitarist Kurt Ballou, and the artwork was created by vocalist Jacob Bannon.

No Heroes reached number 151 on the Billboard 200, and also topped the Top Heatseekers chart and reached number 13 on the Independent Albums chart.

== Musical style and theme ==
In early July 2006, Converge's official website announced the title of the album, as well as the meaning behind it: "These days, cowards outnumber the heroes, and the begging souls outweigh the calloused hands of the hardest of workers. Both in life and in art, the lack of passion is sickening, and the lust for complacency is poisonous. This album is the artistic antithesis of that sinking world; a thorn in the side of their beast. It's for those who move mountains one day at a time. It's for those who truly understand sacrifice. In our world of enemies, we will walk alone..."

In an interview with Alex Gosman of Crossfire, the band talked about the album's theme, or the lack of one. When asked about the album's title, the band stated, "It's completely pointless [to idolize other people/bands] – but that's not the overall theme of the album: just of the 'No Heroes' song. We thought that title would work well for the record too, but it's not a concept album or anything like that; it's still very much a personal record, written about our experiences over the last couple of years."

== Release and promotion ==
No Heroes was released on October 23, 2006 in Europe and October 24, 2006 by Epitaph Records, with a music video for the title track, directed by Ryan Zunkley, being released on the same day. Converge's first headlining tour in support of the album started in November 2006 with Some Girls, Modern Life Is War, Blacklisted, Kylesa, and Gospel.

== Critical reception ==
Professional ratings
Review scores
| Source | Rating |
|---|---|
| AbsolutePunk | 89% link |
| Allmusic | 4/5 stars |
| Collector's Guide to Heavy Metal | 9/10 |
| Drowned in Sound | 8/10 |
| Exclaim! | favorable |
| Pitchfork Media | 8.1/10 link |
| PopMatters | 8/10 |
| Orlando Weekly | favorable link |
| Stylus Magazine | B+ link |
| Sputnikmusic | link |

No Heroes was given a rating 8.1 out of 10 by Brandon Stosuy of Pitchfork Media, who said, "Conceptually reminiscent of the way Orthrelm's OV rocked socks within a tight framework, No Heroes is one of the year's most musically cohesive ways to keep pulses beating rapidly." Sam Roudman of Stylus Magazine gave the album a B+ grade, stating, "As Converge have been instrumental in the expansion of the contemporary hardcore vocabulary—embracing music signifiers previously under the dominion of metal or grind—this return to roots makes this album something of a homecoming."

Notably, No Heroes received a 4.5 out of 5 from Sputnikmusic staff reviewer Jared W. Dillon, who said it was "completely successful in delivering a great array of extremely heavy music". However, Nick Butler, another Sputnikmusic staff reviewer, gave the album a rating of 1.5 out of 5, saying, "if No Heroes isn't the worst album I've heard in 2006, it's certainly the least enjoyable". Despite this being one of the only instances where two of the site's reviewers considerably disagreed with each other, No Heroes was later named the best album of 2006 by Sputnikmusic staff.

== Track listing ==
All lyrics are written by Jacob Bannon; all music is composed by Converge.

| No. | Title | Length |
|---|---|---|
| 1. | "Heartache" | 1:43 |
| 2. | "Hellbound" | 1:07 |
| 3. | "Sacrifice" | 1:37 |
| 4. | "Vengeance" | 0:58 |
| 5. | "Weight of the World" | 1:25 |
| 6. | "No Heroes" | 3:43 |
| 7. | "Plagues" | 4:43 |
| 8. | "Grim Heart/Black Rose" | 9:34 |
| 9. | "Orphaned" | 1:39 |
| 10. | "Lonewolves" | 2:18 |
| 11. | "Versus" | 2:09 |
| 12. | "Trophy Scars" | 4:59 |
| 13. | "Bare My Teeth" | 2:02 |
| 14. | "To the Lions" | 3:40 |

== Personnel ==
Converge

- Jacob Bannon – vocals, percussion (on "Trophy Scars")
- Kurt Ballou – guitars, vocals, organ (on "Plagues"), percussion (on "Trophy Scars")
- Nate Newton – bass guitar, vocals
- Ben Koller – drum kit

Production and recording

- Kurt Ballou – recording and mixing at GodCity
- Converge – production
- Alex Garcia-Rivera (Give Up the Ghost) – drum tech
- Nick Zampiello – mastering at New Alliance East

Guest musicians

- Kevin Baker (The Hope Conspiracy) – backing vocals on "No Heroes", "Hellbound", "Trophy Scars"
- John-Robert Conners (Cave In) – percussion on "Trophy Scars"
- Alex Garcia-Rivera (Give Up the Ghost) – percussion on "Trophy Scars"
- Jonah Jenkins (Only Living Witness, Raw Radar War) – lead vocals on "Grim Heart/Black Rose"
- Adam McGrath (Cave In) – lead guitar on "To the Lions"

Artwork and design

- Jacob Bannon – artwork and design

== Chart performance ==
| Chart (2006) | Peak position |
|---|---|
| Japanese Album Chart | 155 |
| UK Album Chart | 186 |
| US Billboard 200 | 151 |
| US Billboard Heatseekers Albums | 1 |
| US Billboard Independent Albums | 13 |
