= Converge / Napalm Death =

EP by Converge and Napalm Death
- Released: August 1, 2012
- Recorded: Early 2012
- Genre: Deathgrind
- Length: 7:37
- Label: Self-released (CONCULT03)
- Producer: Kurt Ballou/Napalm Death, James Walford

Converge chronology
Converge / Dropdead (2011)	Converge / Napalm Death (2012)	All We Love We Leave Behind (2012)

Napalm Death chronology
Utilitarian (2012)	Converge / Napalm Death (2012)	Apex Predator – Easy Meat (2015)

Professional ratings
Review scores
Source	Rating
Exclaim!	Favourable

Converge / Napalm Death is a split EP by American metalcore band Converge and English grindcore band Napalm Death. The album was self-released on August 1, 2012, and features artwork by Converge vocalist Jacob Bannon. It is available on 7" vinyl and as a digital download.

== Background ==
=== Converge ===
Both bands contributed two new tracks to the EP. Converge contributed "No Light Escapes", a song that later appeared on the deluxe edition of their album All We Love We Leave Behind, as well as a cover version of Swedish death metal band Entombed's "Wolverine Blues". The latter features Bannon, Ballou and Newton as well as guests Tomas Lindberg, Aaron Turner, and Kevin Baker all on vocal duties. Due to scheduling issues the band found it easier to record each vocalist's duties separately to be edited together later as it is on the original track. The track was described by Converge's distributor Deathwish Inc. as being similar to "We Are the World", a collaborative single from 1985 written by Michael Jackson and Lionel Richie, which featured numerous guest musicians."

On May 23, 2013, Converge self-released the EP, Pound for Pound: The Wolverine Blues Sessions, which was a compilation of the different vocal tracks that comprised its cover of "Wolverine Blues." It featured five songs, each of which had only one of the guest vocalists that were present on the split version, with the exception of Lindberg and Ballou who share a track.

=== Napalm Death ===
Napalm Death contributed "Will by Mouth", which is similar to the band's other material, and "No Impediment to Triumph (Bhopal)", which is a "slower and textural" song about the Bhopal disaster from 1984.

== Track listing ==
Side A: Converge
No.	Title	Lyrics	Music	Length
1.	"No Light Escapes"	Jacob Bannon	Kurt Ballou, Bannon, Nate Newton, Ben Koller	0:52
2.	"Wolverine Blues" (Entombed cover)		Nicke Andersson, Uffe Cederlund, Alex Hellid	2:15
Total length:				3:07

Side B: Napalm Death
No.	Title	Lyrics	Music	Length
1.	"Will by Mouth"	Barney Greenway	Shane Embury	1:27
2.	"No Impediment to Triumph (Bhopal)"	Greenway	Embury	3:03
Total length:				4:30

== Personnel ==
Taken from liner notes.

=== Side A ===
==== Converge ====
- Jacob Bannon – lead vocals
- Kurt Ballou – guitars, backing vocals
- Nate Newton – bass, backing vocals
- Ben Koller – drums

==== Guest vocals on "Wolverine Blues" ====
- Kevin Baker (The Hope Conspiracy, All Pigs Must Die)
- Brian Izzi (Trap Them)
- Tomas Lindberg (At the Gates, Disfear)
- Aaron Turner (Isis, Old Man Gloom)

==== Production ====
- Kurt Ballou – recording, mixing
- Allan Douches – mastering

=== Side B ===
==== Napalm Death ====
- Mark "Barney" Greenway – vocals
- Mitch Harris – guitars
- Shane Embury – bass
- Danny Herrera – drums

==== Production ====
- Napalm Death – production
- James Walford – production, mixing, mastering

=== Album artwork ===
- Jacob Bannon – design, photography, illustrations
