= On My Shield =

- Digital cover art image. The physical vinyl's front cover has a die cut circular hole for the record label to show through.

Single by Converge
- Released: July 2010
- Recorded: Summer 2010
- Genre: Extreme metal; hardcore punk
- Length: 4:15
- Label: Self-released (CONCULT01)
- Songwriter(s): Jacob Bannon; Kurt Ballou; Nate Newton; Ben Koller
- Producer(s): Kurt Ballou

Converge singles chronology
"Downpour" / "Serial Killer" (1997)	"On My Shield" (2010)	"'I Can Tell You About Pain" (2017)

"On My Shield" is a single released by American metalcore band Converge. It was originally made available during the band's European tour in July 2010. The single was self-released by the band, though it was distributed by Converge's labels, Epitaph Records and Deathwish Inc. The physical release does not contain a label catalog number, however Deathwish lists the single as CONCULT01. The song was recorded and produced by guitarist Kurt Ballou at his own GodCity studio between the band's 2010 US and European tours in support of Axe to Fall.

== Release ==
The single was released as a limited edition 7-inch vinyl in three different colors, with each variety limited to 1,000 copies. One version was sold during Converge's 2010 European tours, one was sold through the band's Epitaph webstore and the final version was distributed to various vinyl retailers. The single was also released through major digital music retailers later in 2010. The decision to self-release "On My Shield," instead of releasing it through their primary label Epitaph or secondary Deathwish, was made due to the large span of time since their previous 7-inch. Many of Converge's early singles and EPs were self-released, and the band wanted to put out a "fun" and "different" release in the way their older material was made available. The B-side displays a laser etching of the band's shield logo, and does not feature any music. Vocalist Jacob Bannon explained the historical meaning behind the logo:

"The symbol was part of an 18th century medical device used to find imperfections in one's sight. We use the symbol as a visual metaphor for searching for clarity and perspective in one's life."

The song "On My Shield" made its radio debut on the BBC Radio 1 program "The Rock Show with Daniel P. Carter" in July 2010.

== Reception ==
Maxwell of KillYourStereo described the song as "pure Converge," and that "musically, the band continues to write the most intriguing hardcore/punk/metal hybrid that will punish you like the new guy in prison." Joshua T. Cohen of BlowTheScene noted that the intro of "On My Shield" was reminiscent of Converge's "Jane Doe" off their 2001 album Jane Doe. Cohen also commented that the song featured, "several elements that define Converge's sound, including, but not limited to extreme poly-rhythmic drumming, ambient to ultra-dense guitar licks, tastefully driving, distorted bass, and Bannon's patented vocal shred – this track has it all."

== Track listing ==
All music by Converge; all lyrics by Jacob Bannon.

1. "On My Shield" – 4:15

== Personnel ==
Converge

- Jacob Bannon – vocals
- Kurt Ballou – guitars, backing vocals
- Nate Newton – bass guitar
- Ben Koller – drums

Production and art

- Kurt Ballou – production, engineering, mixing
- Jacob Bannon – design, illustration
