= The Dusk in Us =

Studio album by Converge
- Released: November 3, 2017
- Studio: GodCity, Salem, Massachusetts
- Genre: Metalcore; post-hardcore; post-metal; sludge metal; hardcore punk
- Length: 43:53
- Label: Epitaph; Deathwish
- Producer: Kurt Ballou

Converge chronology
All We Love We Leave Behind (2012)	The Dusk in Us (2017)	Beautiful Ruin (2018)

Singles from The Dusk in Us
- 1. "I Can Tell You About Pain" Released: July 25, 2017; 2. "Under Duress" Released: August 15, 2017; 3. "Reptilian" Released: September 27, 2017; 4. "A Single Tear" Released: October 31, 2017

The Dusk in Us is the ninth studio album by American metalcore band Converge. It was released on November 3, 2017, via Epitaph Records and Deathwish Inc, and is the band's first studio album in five years since 2012's All We Love We Leave Behind. The album was produced by Converge guitarist Kurt Ballou and the artwork was created by the band's singer Jacob Bannon.

The Dusk in Us peaked at number 60 on Billboard 200 chart in the United States and it was met with universal critical acclaim, receiving an average score of 89 based on 17 reviews aggregated by Metacritic.

== Background ==
The album is produced by the band's guitarist Kurt Ballou. Ben Koller announced during an interview that the band was planning to start tracking for a new album in the Spring of 2017. Following their tour on April 8, Converge promptly headed into the studio to record their next album.

While eighteen songs were written for the album, only thirteen made it on to the album. One of the five non-album tracks, "Eve" was released as a b-side to the album's lead single "I Can Tell You About Pain". The band were unsure if the remaining four tracks would be released, however Ballou stated that the songs would possibly be released at some point; "We all disagreed about what the strongest songs were, and which songs made for the best record. I think we're all equally unhappy with what ended up on the album. It was a compromise. Some of the songs on that album are actually some of the weakest ones that we recorded, and some of the ones that aren't on the album are the strongest. We're just not exactly sure how we're going to release them yet. Whether it's B-sides, or an EP, we don't know yet." All the four remaining tracks were eventually released on the Beautiful Ruin EP, which came out on June 29, 2018.

== Release and promotion ==
On May 27, 2017, DigBoston published an interview with the band's vocalist, Jacob Bannon, where he revealed that the band had eighteen songs already written and he stated that the album is "very powerful" and will be a "progression of something [they] did previously." On July 25, 2017, Converge released the single "I Can Tell You About Pain", accompanied by a video for the song, directed by Tony Wolski. The single also contained the non-album track “Eve” as a B-side. On August 15, Converge released the song "Under Duress" available for streaming, which was described by Bannon as his "emotional reaction to the complex world in which we live". With the announcement of the song, the album's tracklist and cover art was revealed. The band toured in Europe in August 2017 prior to the release. On September 27, the song “Reptilian” was made available for streaming. The song "A Single Tear" was made available for streaming on October 31 and was also accompanied by a video, directed by Max Moore, described as "heavy with symbolism about parenthood and connection." The Dusk in Us was released through Epitaph Records and Deathwish Inc. on November 3, 2017.

== Reception ==
Professional ratings
Aggregate scores
Source	Rating
AnyDecentMusic?	8.0/10
Metacritic	89/100
Review scores
Source	Rating
AllMusic	4.5/5 stars
Alternative Press	4.5/5 stars
Chicago Tribune	3.5/4 stars
Exclaim!	8/10
The Guardian	4/5 stars
Kerrang!	5/5 stars
The Line of Best Fit	9/10
Metal Hammer	4.5/5 stars
Pitchfork	8.2/10
The Skinny	5/5 stars

The Dusk in Us was met with universal critical acclaim. At Metacritic, which assigns a normalized rating out of 100 to reviews from mainstream publications, it received an average score of 89 based on 18 reviews. Exclaim!'s Joe Smith-Engelhardt praised Converge for "pushing their sound to new levels in a way that is uniquely their own."

=== Accolades ===
Publication	Accolade	Rank	Ref.
Exclaim	Exclaim!'s Top 10 Metal and Hardcore Albums Best of 2017	1	
The Independent	The Top 20 Rock & Metal Albums of 2017	4	
Loudwire	25 Best Metal Albums of 2017	9	
Metacritic	Best Albums of 2017	4	
Metal Hammer	Metal Hammer's 100 best albums of 2017	10	
PopMatters	The Best Metal of 2017	3	
Revolver	20 Best Albums of 2017	5	
Rolling Stone	20 Best Metal Albums of 2017	2	
Stereogum	The 50 Best Albums of 2017	30	
Treblezine	The 20 Best Metal Albums of 2017	1	

== Track listing ==
No.	Title	Length
1.	"A Single Tear"	3:59
2.	"Eye of the Quarrel"	2:14
3.	"Under Duress"	3:42
4.	"Arkhipov Calm"	2:53
5.	"I Can Tell You About Pain"	2:23
6.	"The Dusk in Us"	7:23
7.	"Wildlife"	2:29
8.	"Murk & Marrow"	3:01
9.	"Trigger"	3:33
10.	"Broken by Light"	1:46
11.	"Cannibals"	1:15
12.	"Thousands of Miles Between Us"	4:42
13.	"Reptilian"	4:33
Total length:		43:53

Deluxe edition
No.	Title	Length
14.	"Permanent Blue"	2:24
15.	"Churches and Jails"	1:27
16.	"Melancholia"	1:29
17.	"Beautiful Ruin"	1:23
18.	"Eve"	7:36
Total length:		58:10

== Personnel ==
Converge

- Jacob Bannon – vocals, artwork, design, illustrations
- Kurt Ballou – guitars, bass, backing vocals, production, engineer, mixing
- Nate Newton – bass, guitar, backing vocals
- Ben Koller – drums, percussion

Additional contributors

- Alan Douches – mastering
- Robert Cheeseman – engineering assistance
- Alex Garcia-Rivera – drum technician

== Charts ==
Chart (2017)	Peak position
Australian Albums (ARIA)	79
Belgian Albums (Ultratop Flanders)	136
German Albums (Offizielle Top 100)	79
Scottish Albums (OCC)	75
UK Albums (OCC)	100
US Billboard 200	60
US Top Hard Rock Albums (Billboard)	1
US Top Rock Albums (Billboard)	6
