= Axe to Fall =

Studio album by Converge
- Released: October 19, 2009
- Recorded: May–July 2009
- Studios: GodCity, Salem
- Genres: Metalcore; hardcore punk; grindcore; sludge metal
- Length: 42:04
- Label: Epitaph
- Producer: Kurt Ballou

Converge chronology
No Heroes (2006)	Axe to Fall (2009)	All We Love We Leave Behind (2012)

Axe to Fall is the seventh studio album by American metalcore band Converge, released on October 19, 2009, by Epitaph Records. It is the band's most collaborative album, featuring a number of guest musicians, including members of Cave In and Genghis Tron and Steve Von Till of Neurosis, who performs lead vocals on the slow, Tom Waits-esque track "Cruel Bloom". The album was produced by guitarist Kurt Ballou, and the artwork was created by vocalist Jacob Bannon.

Axe to Fall peaked at number 74 on the Billboard 200, and was well received by critics, who generally described it as their most accessible work.

== Background and recording ==
"For a very long time, we've wanted to do a collaboration album where we could include people we're close with or friends with and who we gel with musically and socially. Now, we did that and it's pretty seamless. [Axe to Fall] doesn't feel like a big rock record where the guest vocalists come out and a spotlight is being thrown on them. It's much more involved than that. It's much more refined."

— Jacob Bannon interview with Spin

Converge began writing Axe to Fall in November 2008. With Jacob Bannon, Kurt Ballou and Nate Newton all living within a half a mile of each other in Boston and Ben Koller living a couple hours away in Brooklyn, the band could easily practice for weeks at a time. Though most songs originated from a guitar or bass riff from Ballou or Newton, all members had equal input on the writing process, with each member proposing different songs. Bannon wrote a few songs for Axe to Fall, but they were scrapped because they were slower than the rest and did not fit the energy of the album.

Following a short tour in March 2009 with Ceremony, Coliseum, Pulling Teeth, Rise and Fall, Converge entered the studio to begin recording in May 2009. The band had debuted some new material live during the tour. As with several of their previous albums, Axe to Fall was produced by guitarist Kurt Ballou at his GodCity Studio in Massachusetts. Throughout the recording process, the band updated their fans via Twitter of their progress in the studio.

During recording, Converge tried to challenge themselves creatively as artists. Ballou stated that with each new Converge album, he "always [wants] to create a new listening-experience", and continued with the concept of "pushing [themselves] forward and not repeating [themselves]". Bannon stated, "We appreciate our past albums, but we're very much about forward movement and challenging ourselves musically and expressing ourselves emotionally". Bannon has stated that he felt that the main artistic difference between Axe to Fall and previous albums was the large number of guest musicians, which included various members from Cave In, Neurosis, and Genghis Tron, among others. Most of the guest-musicians already had an existing relationship with one or more Converge members prior to recording or the band had "admired in some way". Converge had previously thought of the idea of creating a collaborative album with many guest artists for some years, but felt that the "time to execute it [had] never been there". Bannon stated that working with a number of different artists was difficult and something that the band was not used to, but the finished product was "an extremely focused album".

Though writing did not officially begin until November 2008, work on some songs from Axe to Fall began four to five years earlier. In 2004, Converge collaborated with Cave in and recorded some songs together. Dubbed the "Verge In" sessions, the material from this period was never released, and the project later dissolved. The instrumental parts that Cave in contributed to the track "Effigy" were from the original recordings in 2004. Converge took the parts they contributed to the project to create the foundation for what would become "Cruel Bloom" and "Wretched World". While producing their album Board Up the House, Ballou gave Genghis Tron a rough mix of "Wretched World" to contribute their talents. According to Ballou, Genghis Tron "embellished it and created a whole new melodic structure on top of the song that we would've never come up with". Brad Fickeisen from the Red Chord also later added his own drum track to "Wretched World". Much of the song "Plagues" from No Heroes also originated from the "Verge In" sessions. With the release of Axe to Fall, everything Converge contributed to the sessions was finally released in some form.

== Musical style and themes ==
"Anytime anybody writes a song, that's one less thing that you can do and still be original. You can't come along and write "Iron Man" today. All the heavy riffs that are that simple are already taken. So, you've gotta find new riffs, and as more of those become taken, there's fewer places to go."

— Kurt Ballou interview with Decibel

Converge took their music in a more progressive direction with Axe to Fall. Ballou noted that drummer Ben Koller had been listening to more progressive rock over the last few years, and that he tried to complement this sound on the guitar. He went on to say that he was getting the "more straightforward, raw punk aggression out in a yet-to-be-named hardcore side project that I started. So that leaves me free to get weird and progressive with Converge". Ballou considers the band's previous three albums (Jane Doe, You Fail Me and No Heroes) to be a trilogy in regards to their sound, and hoped to push their musical boundaries on Axe to Fall. The tracks on the album have been noted to range from "drone-and-pummel" to atmospheric. Bannon said that this album is "not about being as loud and vicious as possible". Feeling that 40 to 50 minutes of metallic hardcore would be difficult for some, Converge used softer tracks, or "slow jams", such as "Damages" and "Wretched World", to take the listener "to some other places".

Unlike Converge's previous albums, the songs on Axe to Fall do not have a central and consistent lyrical theme. Each song was meant to be a "standalone song" about Bannon's life between this album and No Heroes. Bannon has said that he uses his lyrics and Converge to "vent about things in a healthy way so [he's] not a person that walks around with a lot of negative energy". The opening track "Dark Horse" was written about the passing of a close friend of Bannon, and how he died while trying to succeed as the "underdog".

== Artwork ==
The artwork for the cover and liner note booklet of Axe to Fall was designed and created by Jacob Bannon. The booklet features a different piece of artwork for each song on the album. Bannon tried to create images that "encapsulated some of the emotion of each song" in contrast to more literal imagery, such as avoiding an axe literally falling for the title track. He also experimented with a technique where a single image would be repeated within a frame, but the copies would be distressed or slightly different. This could be seen in the cover art, where a single image of a woman's profile was broken down within the repetition, and some of the copies showed the woman's teeth through her cheek. Bannon stated that for the cover art, he "just wanted to have something that felt timeless and sort of embodied the whole emotional gamut of the record, something that was explosive and powerful but also something that felt poetic and soft at the same time. It could look violent and beautiful at the same time".

== Release and promotion ==
In August 2009, two months prior to the release of the album, Converge made the opening track "Dark Horse" available for streaming and as a free download. The song was noted for being one of the few tracks lacking guest musicians, and was met with a very positive reaction from reviewers. The title track was also made available for free download in September 2009. The entire album was available for streaming one week before the official release date on Converge's MySpace page. Axe to Fall was released on October 19, 2009 (Europe) and October 20, 2009 (USA), by Epitaph Records on CD and digital formats. The vinyl edition of the album was released through Jacob Bannon's own independent record label Deathwish Inc., shortly after the release of the CD version.

A screenshot from the "Axe to Fall" music video, showing a man strapped to a machine with his eyes forced open and tubes sticking out of his mouth

In October 2009, a music video for the album's title track, directed by Craig Murray, was released. The short video (1:40 in duration) shows a man and a woman strapped to a machine, a television that gives birth to a bio-mechanical creature and several disturbing clips in between. The video features stop motion animation influenced by horror films, and was referred to as "terrifying", "seizure-inducing", "nightmarish", "excruciating", and "gross". It was filmed in Ronda, Spain with the intent of making "a film in which we see a cycle. This cycle will study an idea of new creation without pleasure and the art of numbing for progression". Murray was inspired and influenced by artists Chris Cunningham, Gaspar Noé, Nine Inch Nails, and the films Ring, A Clockwork Orange, and Hardware while making the music video. On November 7, the "Axe to Fall" video debuted on MTV2's heavy metal music program Headbangers Ball.

=== Internet leak ===
On October 4, 2009, a digitally watermarked advance copy of Axe to Fall was leaked onto the internet. The watermark was linked to the advance copy given to Shaun Hand, a staff member of the music news and reviews website MetalSucks.net. Converge posted a number of Twitter messages regarding the leak, one of which read, "Special thanks to Shaun Hand at Metal Sucks for leaking our album," and another one was posted shortly thereafter directed at MetalSucks' Twitter account stating, "have fun with that". The source of an album leak is rarely discovered or publicly announced. Converge's method of dealing with their album leaking, referred to as "street justice" by Every Time I Die and Jamey Jasta, avoided a costly lawsuit but still inflicted damages upon MetalSucks by means of viral negative publicity. The staff of MetalSucks issued a formal apology stating that the leak was completely unintentional and the first incident since the website's inception. They went on to say:

We are also deeply embarrassed and regretful. We would never knowingly betray the trust of any band or label. And if you've been following this site, you know that we're huge fans of Converge and Axe to Fall. That this happened with a band and record we hold in such high regard makes the whole thing especially upsetting to us. [...] And for what's it's worth, we'd like to re-emphasize that we think that Axe to Fall is a terrific album, and absolutely worth PAYING FOR when it is released on October 20.

— Axl, Vince, and Everyone at MetalSucks

=== Touring ===
Converge's first tour in support of Axe to Fall was the Metalocalypse tour in late 2009. Alongside High on Fire, Converge held an opening slot for co-headliners Mastodon and Dethklok. The band's first headlining tour in support of the album started in April 2010, with Coalesce, Harvey Milk, Gaza, Lewd Acts and Black Breath. The first week of the tour also featured Thursday and Touché Amoré. Converge began the European leg of their world tour in July 2010 with Kylesa, Gaza and Kvelertak. For this tour, the band released a limited-edition 7-inch vinyl single called "On My Shield", which was recorded between the US and European legs.

== Reception ==
=== Critical reception ===
Professional ratings
Aggregate scores
Source	Rating
Metacritic	77/100
Review scores
Source	Rating
AbsolutePunk	90%
Allmusic	4.5/5 stars
Alternative Press	3.5/5 stars
Decibel	10/10
Drowned in Sound	8/10
Mammoth Press	10/10
Pitchfork	8.5/10
PopMatters	9/10 stars
Rock Sound	9/10
Sputnikmusic	4/5 stars

Axe to Fall was met with positive reviews from critics. On review aggregation website Metacritic, the album holds a score of 77 out of 100 based on ten reviews, indicating "generally favorable" reception. Citing a wider range of styles on the album, many reviewers found Axe to Fall to be Converge's most accessible album to date. The album features songs like the "doomy [and] noisy" track "Worms Will Feed/Rats Will Feast", the "synth-drenched shoegazing" track "Wretched World", and "Kerry King-admiring" solos on "Reap What You Sow" in addition to hardcore tracks like "Effigy" and "Cutter". Andrew Parks of Decibel commented on the album's wide range of sounds, stating "it strikes the perfect balance between dry-heaved hardcore – blunt-trauma-tracks that bleed into one another and hover around the 1:40 mark – and post-metal-opusses that embrace Converge's experimental impulses". Juan Diniz of Mammoth Press noted that the album flowed really well, stating that "every track compliments and balances out the one prior and after. To skip tracks would be foolish as it's a compendium of aggression, frustration, beauty, and brutality," and that the album "demands to be taken in as a whole". Cosmo Lee of Pitchfork Media called Converge "this generation's Black Flag", comparing Axe to Fall to Black Flag's 1984 album My War; Lee noted that Converge combined abrasiveness with "slower, abstract sludge", much like how Black Flag mixed "equal parts lightning and Black Sabbath" on My War. Several reviewers compared the Axe to Fall to Converge's highly praised 2001 album, Jane Doe.

Axe to Fall also received some negative criticism. Jared W. Dillon of Sputnikmusic, who had previously given No Heroes a 4.5 out of 5, gave the album a score of 2.5 out of 5, citing his distaste for the large number of guest musicians. Dillon stated that Converge "seems out of ideas as they enlisted a group of musicians associated with the band to fill in at various points of the record", and rhetorically asked, "why replace the band on a decent portion of their new record with far less talented, less interesting musicians?" He also criticized the album's longer and slower track "Wretched World". When compared to Converge's similar previously released-tracks, (No Heroes's "Grim Heart/Black Rose" and Jane Doe's "Jane Doe") Dillon claimed that the song "never builds to anything" and "cuts off seemingly just as it should've started". Noel Gardner of Drowned in Sound also found Axe to Fall's two closing tracks underwhelming and felt that it "would have been a better album for finishing at track 11". Jason Pettigrew of Alternative Press criticized both the lyrics and overall sound of Axe to Fall as sounding too familiar when it "could've been more alien", and that "in many aspects, Converge took the road most traveled for the majority of Axe to Fall".

=== Charts and sales ===
Axe to Fall debuted at number 74 on the Billboard 200, with 7,400 copies sold in its first week, becoming Converge's highest-charting album in the United States until it was surpassed by 2012's All We Love We Leave Behind. Axe to Fall also became the first Converge album to not appear on the Billboard Top Heatseekers chart, which ranks the top 50 albums released by bands that have never charted above number 100 on the Billboard 200. By November 4, 2009, the album had sold 10,487 units. Axe to Fall also appeared in Canada's Chart Magazine, a weekly chart that compiles airplay data from various Canadian campus radio stations, and peaked at number 42 on their top 50 album chart and number one on their "Metal/Punk" chart.

=== Accolades ===
Axe to Fall appeared on several critics' lists of the best albums of 2009. A "—" denotes the publication's list is in no particular order, and Axe to Fall did not rank numerically.

Publication	Country	Accolade	Year	Rank
Terrorizer	UK	Top 40 Albums of the Year 2009	2009	1
Rock Sound	UK	Top 75 Albums of 2009	2009	2
Decibel	US	Top 40 Extreme Albums of 2009	2009	2
Noisecreep	US	Top 10 Albums of 2009	2009	—
CMU	UK	Top 10 Albums of 2009	2009	—
The A.V. Club	US	Top 25 Albums of 2009	2009	8
The Skinny	Scotland	Top 10 Albums of 2009	2009	6
Sputnikmusic	US	Staff Picks: Top 50 Albums of 2009	2009	5
Revolver	US	The 20 Best Albums of 2009	2009	4
BBC	UK	Best Albums of 2009 – Rock & Indie	2009	8
Metacritic	International	Best Reviews Albums of 2009	2009	13
Allmusic	US	AllMusic's Favorite Metal Albums of 2009	2009	—
PopMatters	US	The Best 60 Albums of 2009	2009	59
PopMatters	US	The Best Metal Albums of 2009	2009	3
Stereogum	US	Top 30 Metal Albums of 2009	2009	1
NPR	US	Top Metal Albums of 2009	2009	5

== Track listing ==
All lyrics are written by Jacob Bannon; all music is composed by Converge, except where noted

No.	Title	Writer(s)	Guest musicians	Length
1.	"Dark Horse"			2:54
2.	"Reap What You Sow"		Sean Martin	2:39
3.	"Axe to Fall"		George Hirsch	1:41
4.	"Effigy"	Converge, Steve Brodsky, John-Robert Connors, Adam McGrath	Brodsky, Connors, McGrath	1:42
5.	"Worms Will Feed/Rats Will Feast"			5:52
6.	"Wishing Well"		Uffe Cederlund	2:49
7.	"Damages"		Trivikrama Dasa	4:26
8.	"Losing Battle"			1:46
9.	"Dead Beat"			2:36
10.	"Cutter"		John Pettibone	1:40
11.	"Slave Driver"			2:48
12.	"Cruel Bloom"	Converge, Steve Von Till	Aimee Argote, The Rodeo, Chris Taylor, Von Till	4:01
13.	"Wretched World"	Converge, Connors, Hamilton Jordan, Mookie Singerman, Michael Sochynsky	Connors, Brad Fickeisen, Jordan, Singerman, Sochynsky	7:10
Total length:				42:04

== Personnel ==
Axe to Fall personnel as listed in CD liner notes.

Converge

- Jacob Bannon – vocals, lyrics
- Kurt Ballou – guitars, vocals, piano, glockenspiel, saxophone
- Nate Newton – bass, backing vocals
- Ben Koller – drums, percussion

Production and recording

- Kurt Ballou – producer, engineer, mixing at GodCity Studios
- Alex Garcia-Rivera – drum tech
- Fred Estby – additional recording
- Josh Penner – additional recording
- Aslak – additional recording
- Jonathan Fuller – additional recording
- Jeff Kane – additional recording
- Steve Von Till – additional recording
- Alan Douches – mastering at West West Side Studios

Artwork and design

- Jacob Bannon – artwork, design and illustrations

Guest musicians

- Sean Martin (ex-Hatebreed, Cage) – lead guitar, backing vocals on "Reap What You Sow"
- George Hirsch (Blacklisted) – backing vocals on "Axe to Fall"
- Steve Brodsky (Cave In) – lead guitar on "Effigy"
- Adam McGrath (Cave In) – guitars on "Effigy"
- John-Robert Conners (Cave In, Doomriders) – drums on "Effigy" and "Wretched World"
- Uffe Cederlund (Disfear, ex-Entombed) – lead guitar, backing vocals on "Wishing Well"
- Tim "Trivikrama Dasa" Cohen (108) – lead guitar on "Damages"
- John Pettibone (Undertow, Himsa) – backing vocals on "Cutter"
- Steve Von Till (Neurosis) – lead vocals on "Cruel Bloom"
- Aimee Argote (Des Ark) – backing vocals on "Cruel Bloom"
- "The Rodeo" – backing vocals on "Cruel Bloom"
- Chris Taylor (Pygmy Lush, Pg. 99) – backing vocals on "Cruel Bloom"
- Mookie Singerman (Genghis Tron) – lead vocals, keyboard on "Wretched World"
- Hamilton Jordan (Genghis Tron) – guitars on "Wretched World"
- Michael Sochynsky (Genghis Tron) – keyboard on "Wretched World"
- Brad Fickeisen (The Red Chord) – drums on "Wretched World"

== Chart performance ==
Chart (2009)	Peak position
Japanese Album Chart	106
UK Albums Chart	196
US Billboard 200	74
US Billboard Hard Rock Albums	12
US Billboard Independent Albums	8
US Billboard Rock Albums	33
