= I Can Tell You About Pain =

Single by Converge

from the album The Dusk in Us
- B-side: "Eve"
- Released: July 25, 2017
- Genre: Hardcore punk; metalcore; post-metal; sludge metal
- Length: 2:23
- Label: Epitaph; Deathwish
- Songwriters: Jacob Bannon; Kurt Ballou; Nate Newton; Ben Koller
- Producer: Kurt Ballou

Converge singles chronology
"'Converge / Napalm Death'" (2012)	"I Can Tell You About Pain" (2017)	"Endless Arrow" (2020)

"I Can Tell You About Pain" is a single by American metalcore band Converge. It was released on July 25, 2017, as a 7-inch vinyl record via Epitaph and Deathwish, Inc., with the much longer track "Eve" as a B-side. The music video for the song "I Can Tell You About Pain" was directed by Tony Wolski.

== Music and critical reception ==
Consequence of Sound's Randall Colburn wrote: ""Eve" serves as a contrast to "I Can Tell You About Pain", as its seven-plus minutes incorporate group chants and menacing synths into its crashing guitars and pummeling percussion, giving the song an eerie epicness." Stereogum writer Tom Breihan described "Eve" as "a monstrous epic", and stated: "Both songs are punishing in very different ways." Pitchfork critic Saby Reyes-Kulkarni thought that "I Can Tell You About Pain"'s production style "almost leans in a black metal direction, giving the song a deceptively quick-and-dirty sound." Reyes-Kulkarni further stated: "This ability to switch from surgically precise to blunt and back again is what keeps Converge continually gripping."

Andy Cush of Spin wrote: "The former ["I Can Tell You About Pain"] is quick and raw, finding the band in full-on firebreathing madness mode; the latter ["Eve"] is an unusually moody epic that clocks in at nearly eight minutes long." Graham Hartmann from Loudwire described "Eve" as "a more experimental piece of Converge's catalogue", stating: "Focusing on doom and drone characteristics, Converge stretch out the expansive track in a way that feels truly inspired. Kurt Ballou's production is top-notch, as always, building a colossal wall of sound for "Eve" that remains dense even in its softest moments." Treble Zine wrote that the former track is "an intense, rhythmically jerky noise-rock burner" while the latter "has some common traits with Oakland sludge innovators Neurosis, with whom the band is touring this summer."

=== Accolades ===
Publication	Accolade	Rank	Ref.
Loudwire	25 Best Metal Songs of 2017	10	
SPIN	The 25 Best Metal Songs of 2017	8	

== Track listing ==
All songs written by Converge.

1. "I Can Tell You About Pain" – 2:24
2. "Eve" – 7:36

== Personnel ==
Converge

- Jacob Bannon – vocals, lyrics
- Kurt Ballou – guitars, vocals, keyboards, production
- Nate Newton – bass
- Ben Koller – drums, percussion
