= Florian Bertmer =

German artist

- FlorianBertmer.jpg

Florian Bertmer is a German illustrator from the hardcore punk, grindcore and metal scene. He has done artwork for bands and companies like Converge, Napalm Death, Danzig, Black Sabbath, Puscifer, The Hope Conspiracy, The Dillinger Escape Plan, Agoraphobic Nosebleed, Pig Destroyer, Doomriders, Kirk Hammett, Lucasfilm, Alamo Drafthouse, Netflix, Funko and others. His early works were reminiscent of Pushead while his later works have become more influenced by Art Nouveau and Occultism . He fronted the band Cheerleaders Of The Apocalypse. He has also created several official movie posters in collaboration with Alamo Drafthouse Cinema and has designed deck art for skateboard companies such as Creature Skateboards or Substance Abuse.

== Music Artwork ==
Artwork for Converge includes illustrations for the inside cover for The Poacher Diaries and back cover artwork and insert poster for Deeper the Wound. Since their 1998 "Rise from Ruin" European tour he has done several t-shirt designs as well and a sought after poster for their 2007 tour.

Artwork for Agoraphobic Nosebleed includes front cover artwork for Bestial Machinery (Discography Volume 1), Split with Kill the Client 7", A Clockwork Sodom 7", Split CD/LP with Apartment 213, Agorapocalypse, and a 7" split with Total Fucking Destruction. In collaboration with Shirts & Destroy he has done several online exclusive shirt designs for Agoraphobic Nosebleed.

Bertmer also designed the cover art for Jesuit's 2011 compilation album Discography.

== Toy Design ==
Since 2018 he has been the sole cover artist for Mondo's Masters of the Universe 1/6th scale toyline.

Aside from the box-art he has contributed numerous concept art for characters such as Trap Jaw and others.

== Album covers (selection) ==
Napalm Death

- Live in Japan - Grind Kaijyu Attack! split with Nasum LP (2009)

Agoraphobic Nosebleed

- Agorapocalypse (2009)
- Bestial Machinery (Discography Volume 1) 2xCD (2005)
- The Poacher Diaries split with Converge CD/LP (1999)
- Split with Kill The Client 7" (2007)
- A Clockwork Sodom 7" (2007)
- Domestic Powerviolence split with Apartment 213 CD/LP (2007)
- Split with Total Fucking Destruction 7" (2007)
- Split with Insect Warfare 5"/mini-CD (2008)

Converge

- The Poacher Diaries split with Converge CD/LP (1999)
- Deeper the Wound Split with Hellchild CD/LP (2001)

Jesuit

- Discography (2011)

Rise and Fall

- Clawing 7" (2007)

All Pigs Must Die

- All Pigs Must Die EP( 2010)
- God Is War CD/LP (2011)

16

- Bridges to Burn CD/LP (2009)\

Outbreak

- Failure CD/LP (2006)

== Movie artwork ==
He has worked on numerous limited edition movie posters for Alamo Drafthouse for such iconic films as The Holy Mountain, Alien, Hellboy, the Evil Dead, Shin Godzilla, Destroy All Monsters, Masters of the Universe Revelation, Night of the Living Dead, Return of the Living Dead, Santa Sangre, the Swamp Thing, Hellraiser and Cowboys and Aliens.
