= And on and On... =

Studio album by Despise You and Agoraphobic Nosebleed
- Released: April 26, 2011
- Studio: 818 Studios (Despise You side); Visceral Sound; Zine Recording, Westfield, Massachusetts (Agoraphobic Nosebleed side)
- Genre: Grindcore, powerviolence, hardcore punk
- Length: 32:29
- Label: Relapse
- Producer: Paul Fig (Despise You side); Scott Hull (Agoraphobic Nosebleed side)

Despise You chronology
West Side Horizons (1999)	And on and On... (2011)	All Your Majestic Bullshit (2015)

Agoraphobic Nosebleed chronology
Agorapocalypse (2009)	And on and On... (2011)	Arc (2016)

Professional ratings
Review scores
Source	Rating
Allmusic	4/5 stars
Teeth of the Divine	Favorable
Heavy Blog Is Heavy	3/5
Trebuchet Magazine	Favorable
Verbicide	Favorable

And on and On... is a split album by powerviolence band Despise You and grindcore band Agoraphobic Nosebleed. It was released on April 26, 2011, through Relapse Records. It includes the first material written by Despise You since their 2007 reformation.

== Background ==
Despise You were offered by Relapse Records and Agoraphobic Nosebleed to do a split, so they took 6 months to write material and record. The Despise You side was recorded at 818 Studios with the help of Paul Fig, and it was mixed at the studio Black Korea. The Agoraphobic Nosebleed side was recorded at Visceral Sound, with vocals being tracked at Zing Recording at Westfield, Massachusetts. The cover art, depicting a drive-by aftermath in East Los Angeles, was taken by photographer Joseph Rodriguez. The song "3/26/00" was written about Chris Elder's daughter.

== Track listing ==
Despise You
No.	Title	Length
1.	"Bereft"	0:38
2.	"Repeat Until You Fail"	0:15
3.	"Roll Call"	1:11
4.	"3/26/00"	0:23
5.	"Three Day Hold"	0:35
6.	"Yes Officer/No Officer"	0:28
7.	"Fear's Song"	1:48
8.	"Two or Ten Faces"	0:27
9.	"Shit Goes in, Shit Comes Out"	0:36
10.	"You Can't Fix Me, Don't Trip"	0:53
11.	"Painted Gray"	1:25
12.	"All the Regimes You Hold Dear"	0:34
13.	"Destinial"	0:46
14.	"Bankrupt Social Code"	0:29
15.	"Seven Funerals"	0:57
16.	"They All Died Is What Happened"	1:31
17.	"...And Expirations"	0:27
18.	"Cedar Ave. (Was the Best Place to Watch People Ascend to Heaven)"	3:29

Agoraphobic Nosebleed
No.	Title	Length
19.	"Half Dead"	4:34
20.	"As Bad As It Is..."	2:13
21.	"Miscommunication"	0:25
22.	"Los Infernos"	0:27
23.	"Ungrateful"	0:50
24.	"Possession"	2:40
25.	"Burlap Sack"	4:40
Total length:		32:29

== Personnel ==
=== Despise You side ===
- Chris Elder – vocals, layout
- Phil Vera – guitars
- Cynthia Nishi – vocals
- Rob Alaniz – drums
- Chris Dodge – bass
- Paul Fig – production

=== Agoraphobic Nosebleed side ===
- Jay Randall – vocals, layout, lyrics
- Katherine Katz – vocals
- Scott Hull – guitar, vocals, production
- Richard Johnson – bass
- Eric Arena – vocal tracking
- Chris Cannella – guitar on "As Bad As It Is..." and "Possession"
