= Agorapocalypse =

Studio album by Agoraphobic Nosebleed
- Released: April 14, 2009
- Recorded: Visceral Sound studios, October 2007 – December 2008
- Genre: Grindcore
- Length: 28:31
- Label: Relapse
- Producer: Matthew F. Jacobson

Agoraphobic Nosebleed chronology
Split with Insect Warfare (2008)	Agorapocalypse (2009)	Split with Crom (2009)

Agorapocalypse is the fourth full-length studio album by American grindcore band Agoraphobic Nosebleed (ANb). It was released through Relapse Records on April 14, 2009, in the United States, and April 20 internationally. The album was recorded by ANb's guitarist Scott Hull at his Visceral Sound studios; Hull also wrote the drum parts using Toontrack's Drumkit from Hell in his digital audio workstation. This is also the band's only album with vocalist Katherine Katz. Agorapocalypse's cover artwork was designed by German illustrator Florian Bertmer.

== Artwork ==
The cover art for Agorapocalypse was drawn by German illustrator Florian Bertmer, who had previously designed the covers for ANb's Bestial Machinery (Discography Volume 1), Agoraphobic Nosebleed / Kill the Client and the inner-sleeve illustration for the group's 1999 split with Converge, The Poacher Diaries. Bertmer, vocalist J. Randall, and guitarist Scott Hull discussed the themes of the album art by phone and agreed to give it an "old-school thrashcore vibe", because of ANb's new musical direction. Agorapocalypse's design was also inspired by the Mad Marc Rude illustration for the Misfits' Earth A.D., which Bertmer defined as "insanely detailed". Bertmer also explained that "[he] tried to incorporate as many iconic characters to give the whole piece a claustrophobic appearance."

Bertmer initially created an outline black-and-white ink drawing measuring 14 inches (36 cm) square; he spent about two weeks sketching and one week drawing, then colored it on a computer. He stylized depictions of "nuclear war, drug use, police brutality, and a greedy businessman—the art is less shocking to the senses by its vivid colors and comic-like appearance." The green head in the middle of Agorapocalypse's cover art is based on a photo of Bertmer himself.

== Release ==
To promote Agorapocalypse, ANb made the album available for streaming in its entirety at www.agorapocalypse.com on April 13, 2009. Agorapocalypse was released through Relapse Records, on April 14 in North America and April 20 internationally. The album was issued on CD, a limited edition LP packaged with a 12 inches (30 cm) square full-color, 28-page booklet, and a mailorder-only longbox CD set limited to 1,000 copies that includes a 18 in × 24 in (46 cm × 61 cm) full-color poster, four-piece pin set and 5 in × 2.25 in (12.7 cm × 5.7 cm) embroidered patch. According to Nielsen SoundScan, Agorapocalypse sold around 1,300 copies in the United States in its first week of release, and peaked at number 41 on the Billboard's Top Heatseekers chart.

The Japanese edition included four bonus tracks, taken from their split with Insect Warfare.

== Reception ==
Professional ratings
Review scores
Source	Rating
About.com	4/5 stars
AllMusic	3.5/5 stars
Baltimore City Paper	favorable
Decibel	8/10 stars
Exclaim!	favorable
Eye Weekly	favorable
The Maine Campus	A−
Pitchfork	5/10
PopMatters	8/10
Washington City Paper	mixed

Greg Pratt of Exclaim! magazine defined Agorapocalypse as "shockingly straight-ahead", while About.com summarized the album by saying "Agorapocalypse might lack a bit of the deviant vibe of ANb's past work, but there's still thrash, grind and a liberal dose of madness."

Unlike ANb's previous releases, on Agorapocalypse the group slowed down its sound to a thrashcore style of the 1980s. With this shift in sound, Cosmo Lee of Pitchfork was more critical, stating that "Agorapocalypse is disappointingly listenable. Song lengths are up, exceeding two and three minutes, and the songwriting has diversified. Instead of simply beating listeners into a pulp, songs now speed up, slow down, and breathe."

== Track listing ==
All songs written and composed by Scott Hull.

No.	Title	Length
0.	"Timelord Zero (Chronovore)" (hidden track in pregap)	3:23
1.	"Agorapocalypse Now"	2:25
2.	"Timelord One (Loneliness of the Long Distance Drug Runner)"	0:56
3.	"Dick to Mouth Resuscitation"	1:16
4.	"Moral Distortion"	2:00
5.	"Hung from the Rising Sun"	2:10
6.	"First National Stem Cell and Clone"	3:19
7.	"Question of Integrity"	2:30
8.	"Timelord Two (Paradoxical Reaction)"	3:03
9.	"Trauma Queen"	1:51
10.	"White on White Crime"	3:19
11.	"Druggernaut Jug Fuck"	2:23
12.	"Ex-Cop"	0:59
13.	"Flamingo Snuff"	2:20

== Personnel ==
- Katherine Katz – vocals
- Jay Randall – vocals
- Richard Johnson – vocals
- Scott Hull – guitar, bass, drum programming, engineering, mixing, mastering
- Matthew F. Jacobson – production
- Florian Bertmer – artwork
