= PCP Torpedo =

Grindcore EP by Agoraphobic Nosebleed

EP by Agoraphobic Nosebleed
- Released: 1998
- Genre: Grindcore
- Length: 6:23
- Label: Hydra Head

Agoraphobic Nosebleed chronology
| Honky Reduction (1998) | PCP Torpedo (1998) | Split with Gob (1998) |

PCP Torpedo is a 6" vinyl EP by American grindcore band Agoraphobic Nosebleed. It was released in 1998 on Hydra Head Records. PCP Torpedo was pressed on assorted colours, including black, black/red mixed, red, and orange/red mixed. The opening sample on "Thanksgiving Day" is Richard Pryor as Zeke Brown in the film Blue Collar.

== Track listing ==
| No. | Title | Length |
|---|---|---|
| 1. | "Thanksgiving Day" | 1:07 |
| 2. | "The Man from Famine" | 0:21 |
| 3. | "Crash Course to Maximum Nowhere" | 0:30 |
| 4. | "PCP Torpedo" | 0:09 |
| 5. | "Information Super Lost Highway" | 0:23 |
| 6. | "Thinning the Heard" | 0:58 |
| 7. | "Clorox Bong (Identity Picnic)" | 0:22 |
| 8. | "Latin Thrift Cave" | 0:28 |
| 9. | "Doubled Over" | 0:46 |
| 10. | "Strong Stench of Balance" | 1:16 |

== PCP Torpedo/ANbRx reissue ==
PCP Torpedo/ANbRx

Compilation album by Agoraphobic Nosebleed
- Released: 2006
- Recorded: 1998–2006
- Genre: Grindcore
- Length: 75:07
- Label: Hydra Head
- Producers: Scott Hull, James Randall

Agoraphobic Nosebleed chronology
| Bestial Machinery (Discography Volume 1) (2005) | PCP Torpedo/ANbRx (2006) | Agoraphobic Nosebleed / Kill the Client (2007) |

Professional ratings
Review scores
| Source | Rating |
|---|---|
| Allmusic | 3.5/5 stars |
| Exclaim! | mixed |
| PopMatters | 7/10 |
| Stylus | B− |

PCP Torpedo/ANbRx is a 2-CD set that contains the re-release of the out of print PCP Torpedo 6". The second disc, ANbRx, consists of remixes of songs from PCP Torpedo. Among notable contributors are Merzbow, Vidna Obmana, James Plotkin and Justin Broadrick.

Much like the Altered States of America album, both discs contain hidden tracks: "Azido Phencyclidine Electrophoresis" on disc one and "Submachine Drum (Agoraphonic Nosecandy mix)" on disc two, both of which are accessible by rewinding the first track.

=== Track listing ===
PCP Torpedo
| No. | Title | Length |
|---|---|---|
| 0. | "Azido Phencyclidine Electrophoresis" | 10:48 |
| 1. | "Thanksgiving Day" | 1:08 |
| 2. | "The Man from Famine" | 0:22 |
| 3. | "Crash Course to Maximum Nowhere" | 0:30 |
| 4. | "PCP Torpedo" | 0:09 |
| 5. | "Information Super Lost Highway" | 0:23 |
| 6. | "Thinning the Herd" | 1:03 |
| 7. | "Clorox Bong (Identity Picnic)" | 0:20 |
| 8. | "Latin Thrift Cave" | 0:28 |
| 9. | "Doubled Over" | 0:45 |
| 10. | "Strong Stench of Balance" | 1:17 |
| Total length: | | 17:13 |

ANbRx
| No. | Title | Remixer | Length |
|---|---|---|---|
| 0. | "Agoraphonic Nosecandy Mix" | Submachine Drum | 4:09 |
| 1. | "Three Ring Inferno" | Vidna Obmana | 4:22 |
| 2. | "Agoranopticon Xanophobic mix" | Dev/Null & Xanopticon | 4:25 |
| 3. | "Phantomsmasher mix" | James Plotkin | 1:45 |
| 4. | "Thanksgiving Day (Creed Are Twats & Nickleback Look Like Michael Bolton mix)" | Speedranch | 2:13 |
| 5. | "Agorzbow Merzbleed mix" | Merzbow | 2:08 |
| 6. | "Decimated Spleencrawler mix" | Jansky Noise | 1:29 |
| 7. | "Doubled Over (Throwing Up Blood mix)" | AUEK | 1:03 |
| 8. | "Flesh of Jesu mix" | Justin Broadrick | 6:38 |
| 9. | "Smoke Hard Drugz mix" | Drokz & Tails | 4:39 |
| 10. | "Harder Drugs Faster mix" | Drokz | 4:04 |
| 11. | "Apocalypse Nosebleed mix" | Hellz Army | 3:56 |
| 12. | "Interchangeable Antichrist mix" | Substance Abuse | 4:58 |
| 13. | "Bloodlusted mix" | Substance Abuse | 4:04 |
| 14. | "PCP Power Trip mix" | Submachine Drum | 8:01 |
| Total length: | | | 57:54 |
