= A Clockwork Sodom =

A Clockwork Sodom / Tentacles of Destruction

EP by Agoraphobic Nosebleed
- Released: 2007
- Recorded: 2003
- Genre: Grindcore
- Label: Garden of Exile

Agoraphobic Nosebleed chronology
Agoraphobic Nosebleed / Kill the Client (2007)	A Clockwork Sodom / Tentacles of Destruction (2007)	Domestic Powerviolence (2007)

A Clockwork Sodom / Tentacles of Destruction is an EP by grindcore band Agoraphobic Nosebleed. The music on this EP was recorded shortly after Altered States of America was completed, featuring the same line-up. The EP featured a more metal sound than previous efforts. The songs were meant to be a contrast to "the absurdity of Altered States of America", and so were all written to be longer than 2 minutes. The release was a one-time pressing, limited to 800 copies. The front cover was done by German artist Florian Bertmer.

The cover art depicts a "zombified" version of A Clockwork Orange's cover.

== Track listing ==
Side A – A Clockwork Sodom
No.	Title	Length
1.	"A Lashing for the Ages"	2:22
2.	"A Clockwork Sodom"	2:54

Side B – Tentacles of Destruction
No.	Title	Length
1.	"Tempting the Fires of Gehenna"	2:02
2.	"The Compensation Phenomenon"	2:30
