= Frozen Corpse Stuffed with Dope =

Studio album by Agoraphobic Nosebleed
- Released: June 11, 2002
- Recorded: 2000–2002
- Genre: Grindcore
- Length: 33:40
- Label: Relapse
- Producer: Scott Hull

Agoraphobic Nosebleed chronology
Split with Benümb (2001)	Frozen Corpse Stuffed with Dope (2002)	Split with Halo (2002)

Professional ratings
Review scores
Source	Rating
Allmusic	2.5/5 stars

Frozen Corpse Stuffed with Dope is the second full-length album released by grindcore band Agoraphobic Nosebleed.

== Track listing ==
No.	Title	Length
1.	"Engineering a Pill Frenzy"	0:12
2.	"Bitch's Handbag Full of Money"	0:34
3.	"Unwashed Cock"	0:28
4.	"Kill Theme for American Apeshit"	1:02
5.	"Built to Grind"	0:21
6.	"Crap Cannon"	0:34
7.	"Razorblades Under the Dashboard"	0:51
8.	"Repercussions in the Life of an Opportunistic, Pseudo-Intellectual Jackass"	1:27
9.	"Doctored Results"	1:41
10.	"Ceremonial Gas Mask"	0:59
11.	"Hang the Pope" (Nuclear Assault cover)	0:41
12.	"Bovine Caligula"	0:23
13.	"Machine Gun"	1:28
14.	"Protection from Enemies"	0:19
15.	"Dead Battery"	1:00
16.	"Manual Trauma"	0:40
17.	"Time vs. Necessity"	0:51
18.	"Blind Hatred Finds a Tit"	0:39
19.	"Grandmother with AIDS"	0:49
20.	"5 Band Genetic Equalizer 2"	0:32
21.	"Hungry Homeless Handjob"	2:00
22.	"Chalking the Temporal God Module"	1:33
23.	"Narcissistic Stimulant"	0:30
24.	"North American Corpse Desecration"	0:44
25.	"Cryogenic Husk"	1:15
26.	"Shit Slit"	0:17
27.	"Sword Swallower"	0:36
28.	"Ceramic Godproduct"	0:28
29.	"Ambulance Burning"	0:38
30.	"5 Band Genetic Equalizer"	0:37
31.	"Drinking Games"	0:38
32.	"Bullshit Gets Up and Walks Around"	0:14
33.	"The Fatter You Fall Behind"	0:14
34.	"Double Negative"	0:25
35.	"Organ Donor"	0:59
36.	"Someone's Daughter"	0:27
37.	"Contaminated Drug Supply"	0:59
38.	"Fuckmaker" (Hidden track begins at 4:55)	5:12

== Personnel ==
- Scott Hull – guitar, programming, backing vocals
- Richard Johnson – bass guitar, backing vocals
- Carl Schultz – vocals
- J. Randall – vocals, samples
- Killjoy – vocals ("Machine Gun")
- Pete Benümb – vocals ("Repercussions in the Life of an Opportunistic, Pseudo-Intellectual Jackass")
- Lenzig Carnage – vocals ("Razorblades Under the Dashboard")
- Dan Lilker – vocals, bass ("Hang the Pope")
- J. R. Hayes – vocals ("Hungry Homeless Handjob", "Ceramic God Product", "Organ Donor")
- Aaron Turner – album artwork
