= Forced Perspective (film) =

2015 film

- Directed by: Nick Cavalier
- Written by: Nick Cavalier
- Produced by: Martin Geramita
- Cinematography: John Pope; Sergio Salgado
- Edited by: Nick Cavalier
- Music by: Chihsuan Yang
- Production company: Coat of Arms
- Release date: 2015
- Running time: 95 minutes
- Country: United States
- Language: English

Forced Perspective: The Art and Life of Derek Hess is a 2015 documentary about American based artist Derek Hess. The film tells the story of Hess's life and how his struggles with alcoholism and bipolar disorder have impacted his life and career.

== Accolades ==
Forced Perspective has taken home multiple awards from several film festivals including:

- Local Heroes Award - 2015 Cleveland International Film Festival
- Best Cinematography Award - 2015 Beverly Hills Film Festival
- Best Art Documentary - 2015 Atlanta International Documentary Film Festival
- Platinum Award Winner - 2015 Spotlight Awards
- Best Documentary Award - 2015 Kingston Film Festival
- Best Feature Film Award - 2015 Reel Indie Film Fest in Toronto.

Forced Perspective was also an official selection for "Excellence in title design" at the 2015 SXSW film festival, and was an official selection at the 2015 Indy Film Fest and 2015 Blue Whiskey Independent Film Festival.
