= Deeper the Wound =

Studio album (split) by Converge and Hellchild
- Released: April 23, 2001
- Recorded: February–July 2000
- Studio: Converge; GodCity, Salem, Massachusetts Hellchild; Sharkbite, Oakland, California
- Genre: Metalcore; hardcore punk
- Length: 35:05
- Label: Deathwish (DWI01)
- Producer: Converge: Andrew Schneider; Kurt Ballou; Jacob Bannon; Hellchild: Billy Anderson; Hellchild

Converge and Hellchild chronology
The Poacher Diaries (1999)	Deeper the Wound (2001)	Jane Doe (2001)

Professional ratings
Review scores
Source	Rating
The Encyclopedia of Popular Music	3/5 stars

Deeper the Wound is a split album between American band Converge and Japanese band Hellchild. The album was released through Deathwish Inc. in America on April 23, 2001. Deeper the Wound was also the first album released through Deathwish. It was later released by Bastardize Records in Japan in 2006. The album features one new track from each artist, one cover song from each artist, and a few live versions of previously released tracks. The new track "Thaw" was later re-recorded and released on Converge's 2001 album, Jane Doe.

== Track listing ==
Converge

1. "Thaw" – 4:18
2. "Clean" (Depeche Mode cover) – 6:03
3. "Conduit" (live) – 3:50
4. "Shallow Breathing" (live) – 0:57
5. "Locust Reign" (live) – 1:32

Hellchild

6. "1" – 4:22
7. "Insurrection of the Living Damned" (Bulldozer cover) – 6:37
8. "In This Freezing Night" (live) – 4:18
9. "Without Any Answers" (live) – 3:08

== Personnel ==
Production

- Kurt Ballou – production, engineering
- Jacob Bannon – production
- Hellchild – production

Artwork and design

- Jacob Bannon – art direction, design
- Derek Hess – illustrations, cover/inside art
- Florian Bertmer – illustrations, inside/back art
