= Despise You =

American powerviolence band

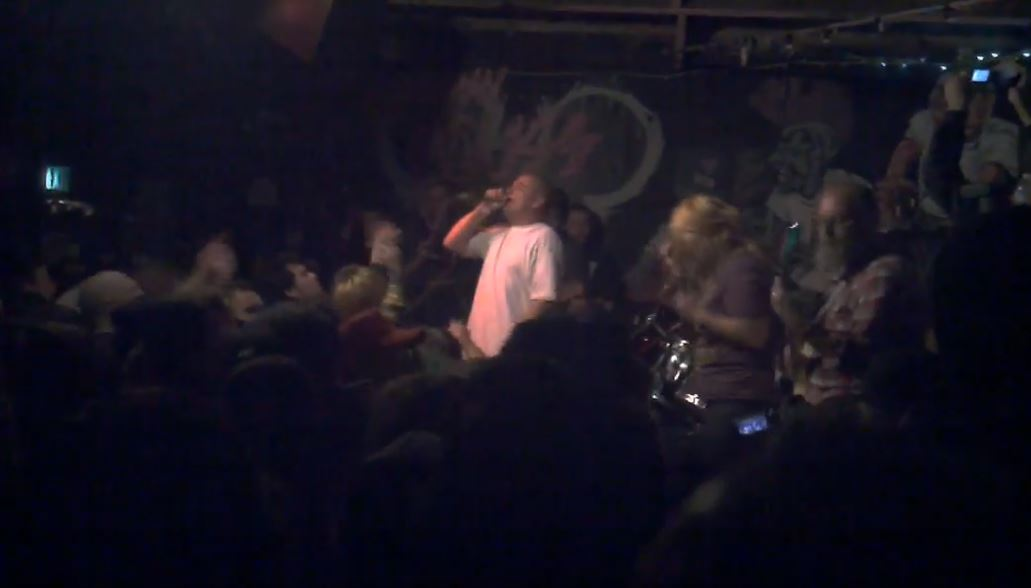

Background information
- Also known as: DxYx
- Origin: Inglewood, California
- Genres: Powerviolence, hardcore punk
- Years active: 1994–1996, 2007–present
- Labels: Pessimiser Records, Relapse, Slap-a-Ham, Theologian Records, Tankcrimes
- Members: Chris Elder; Cynthia Nishi; Phil Vera; Andrew Solis; Andrew Morgan
- Past members: Lulu Hernandez; Frankie Knucks; Jerry Flores; Chris Dodge; Jorge "Snacks" Herrera

Despise You are an American powerviolence band from Inglewood, California, formed in 1994. The group is noted for helping influencing the powerviolence movement and for their bleak lyrics about topics such as gang violence, misanthropy, and self-hate. The band was known for being mysterious during their initial run; they often used pseudonyms in their liner notes and they never played live shows until their reformation in 2007. They have been described as "the angriest band in the world" by some.

== History ==
Guitarist Phil Vera first met vocalist/guitarist Chris Elder back when they hosted an underground death metal/black metal-themed radio show called "Hour of the Goat" on KXLU from 1992 to 1994. The duo would then recruit bassist and vocalist Lulu Hernandez as well as drummer Rob Alaniz. Hernandez was only 16 when she joined the band. From 1995 to 1996, the group issued a few split 7-inch and compilation tracks through labels such as Pessimiser (which Elder owned and operated) and Slap-a-Ham before quietly breaking up in 1996. During their initial run, the group had a revolving door of members that included guitarist Jerry Flores from Excruciating Terror, drummer Martin Alvarado, and bassist Frankie Knuckles from Stapled Shut and Nausea (Los Angeles).

In 2007, the band reunited to perform their first ever live show. Hernandez did not join for the reunion, so to fill in her place the band recruited vocalist Cynthia Nishi and bassist Chris Dodge, operator of Slap-a-Ham and former member of Spazz. In 2011, the group released the split album And on and On... with Agoraphobic Nosebleed, which was issued through Relapse Records. The split included the first material written by the band since their reformation. The band played the A389 Bash music festival that same year. In 2014, Dodge left the group to focus more on his family.

== Members ==
=== Current members ===
- Phil Vera – guitar
- Chris Elder – guitar, vocals (1994–1996) vocals (2007–present)
- Cynthia Nishi – vocals
- Andrew Solis – bass
- Jorge Herrera – drums

=== Former members ===
- Lulu Hernandez – bass, vocals
- Jerry Flores – guitar
- Frankie Knucks – bass
- Martin Alvarado – drums
- Chris Dodge – bass
- Rob Alaniz – drums

== Discography ==
=== Studio albums ===
- And on and On... split CD/LP with Agoraphobic Nosebleed (2011, Relapse)

=== EPs ===
- Despise You 7-inch (1996, Theologian/Pessimiser)
- All Your Majestic Bullshit 7-inch (2015, Pessimiser)

=== Splits ===
- ...To Show How Much You Meant/Mechanized Flesh split 7-inch with Suppression (1995, Slap-a-Ham)
- split 7-inch with Crom (1995, Theologian/Pessimiser)
- split 7-inch with Stapled Shut (1996, Theologian/Pessimiser)
- split 7-inch with Coke Bust (2017, To Live A Lie)

=== Compilation albums ===
- West Side Horizons (1999, Pessimiser)
