= Altered States of America =

Studio album by Agoraphobic Nosebleed
- Released: March 31, 2003
- Genre: Grindcore
- Length: 21:42
- Label: Relapse

Agoraphobic Nosebleed chronology
Split with Halo (2002)	Altered States of America (2003)	Bestial Machinery (Discography Volume 1) (2005)

Professional ratings
Review scores
Source	Rating
Allmusic	4/5 stars

Altered States of America is a 100-song 3" mini CD and the third studio album released by grindcore band Agoraphobic Nosebleed. The album's songs cover a variety of topics, with many referring to violence and drug use. Several songs consist solely of a vocal delivery of the title on top of noise, such as "The Tokyo Subway Gassing" and "The Star of David". The album is divided into movements, some of which are titled. "Wonder Drug Wonderland", which is credited as track 00, can be found on the CD by holding rewind at the start of track 1; it is the first song on the LP. The cover art was created by Jeff Gaither.

In late 2008, Altered States of America was re-issued as a two disc set with the second disc, titled ANbRx II: Delta 9, consisting of remixes from Chicago industrial/hardcore artist Delta 9. The song titles on the remix disc were inspired by the Merzbow/Gore Beyond Necropsy collaboration Rectal Anarchy.

== Track listing ==
No.	Title	Length
0.	"Wonder Drug Wonderland"	1:45
1.	"Spreading the Dis-Ease"	0:56
2.	"Ark of Ecoterrorism"	0:13
3.	"Living Lolita Blowjob"	0:12
4.	"Thawing Out"	0:15
5.	"Need for Better Body Armor"	0:09
6.	"Freeze-Dried Cemetery"	0:20
7.	"Children Blown to Bits by the Busload"	0:12
8.	"Scoring in Heaven"	0:13
9.	"Fuck Your Soccer Jesus"	0:05
10.	"Guided Tour"	0:22
11.	"Honky Dong"	0:08
12.	"Famous Last Words"	0:18
13.	"Osaka Korova Milk Bar"	0:17
14.	"Drive-By Blowjob on a Bicycle"	0:12
15.	"Ten Pounds of Remains"	0:07
16.	"Utter Mental Retardation and Reversal of Man"	0:15
17.	"Neotropolis Euphoria"	0:08
18.	"Snitch Olympics"	0:16
19.	"Crawling out of the Cradle into the Casket"	0:15
20.	"Removing Locator Tooth"	0:06
21.	"Aum Shinrikyo"	0:04
22.	"The Protocols of the Elders of Zion"	0:04
23.	"The Tokyo Subway Gassing"	0:04
24.	"The Star of David"	0:04
25.	"Shintaro Ishihara and the Rape of Nanking in World War 2"	0:05
26.	"Mahikari"	0:12
27.	"Micro-Tidal Wave"	0:04
28.	"Crop Dusting"	0:12
29.	"LSD as a Chemical Weapon"	0:14
30.	"Illegal Manufacture"	0:08
31.	"Drugging the Control Group"	0:10
32.	"Alice in La La Land"	0:04
33.	"Apocalypse as Mescaline Experience"	0:10
34.	"The Artificial Religious Experience"	0:06
35.	"The First Day of Sodom: Pussy Hair Prayer Rug"	0:05
36.	"The Second Day of Sodom: Distortion in Eden"	0:04
37.	"The Third Day of Sodom: Serpent of the Gay Pride Rainbow"	0:04
38.	"The Fourth Day of Sodom: Snaking Adam's Black Apple"	0:04
39.	"The Fifth Day of Sodom: Like a Cretin on Christmas Eve"	0:04
40.	"The Sixth Day of Sodom: Boston Hardcore Caligula"	0:05
41.	"The Seventh Day of Sodom: Fantasizing Hydrahead"	0:07
42.	"The Eighth Day of Sodom: Lamb of the Rotisserie God"	0:04
43.	"The Ninth Day of Sodom: Holiday Bowl Full of Asshole"	0:04
44.	"The Tenth Day of Sodom: Enter the House of Feasting"	0:05
45.	"The Eleventh Day of Sodom: Passing Blunts and Cunts at Relapse"	0:05
46.	"The Twelfth Day of Sodom: When Taking a Shit Feels Sexy"	0:07
47.	"Poland Springfield Acidbag"	0:19
48.	"Rectal Thermometer"	0:11
49.	"Lemonade and a Snickers Bar"	0:05
50.	"Necro-Cannibalistic Tendencies in Young Children"	0:08
51.	"Bombs with Butterfly Wings"	0:09
52.	"Watching a Clown Point a Gun at a Small Dog (reprise)"	0:16
53.	"Mosquito Holding Human Cattle Prod"	0:24
54.	"For Just Ten Cents a Day..."	0:25
55.	"Mental Change(s): Altered Consciousness"	0:06
56.	"Radical Modernism"	0:04
57.	"Human Enhancement"	0:04
58.	"Juxtaposed Impacts"	0:04
59.	"Unprecedented Experiment"	0:38
60.	"Transparent Enclosure"	0:09
61.	"Bong Hit Wonder"	0:08
62.	"Opening to Personals Ad by Richard Johnson"	0:14
63.	"Relapse Refusing U.N. Weapons Inspectors"	0:09
64.	"Neural Linguistic Programming"	0:12
65.	"The Fag vs. the Indian"	0:05
66.	"Black Metal Transvestite"	0:18
67.	"Debbie Does Dishes"	0:04
68.	"Marine Pornography (For Whale Cock Skateboards)"	0:18
69.	"Keeping a Clean Kennel"	0:04
70.	"Baby Mill Pt. 1 (Born and Sold into Child Slavery)"	0:07
71.	"Firearms for All Faiths"	0:12
72.	"Domestic Solution"	0:04
73.	"Definition of Death"	0:39
74.	"Discolored"	0:10
75.	"Scott Hulk on Intramuscular Steroids"	0:09
76.	"4 Leeches (40,000 Leeches)"	0:55
77.	"Group Taking Acid as Considered Conspiracy Against the Government"	0:06
78.	"Small Room and a Six-Pack"	0:06
79.	"Deviant Arousal"	0:06
80.	"Unbound by Civilized Properties"	0:08
81.	"They All Burned!"	0:12
82.	"Shotgun Funeral"	0:04
83.	"Homophobic Assbleed"	0:05
84.	"Exacting Revenge on Pets"	0:08
85.	"Baby Mill Pt. 2 (White Russian)"	0:07
86.	"Narcoterrorist Megalomaniac"	0:25
87.	"Releasing a Dove from a Ghetto Rooftop"	0:08
88.	"Bipartisan Buttfuck"	0:14
89.	"Bent over the Cross"	0:25
90.	"A Chance at Reprisal"	0:15
91.	"Altered Ego"	0:17
92.	"Pin the Tail on the Donkey"	0:21
93.	"Latter Day Mormon Ritual"	0:18
94.	"5-Band Genetic Equalizer, Pt. 3"	0:21
95.	"Absurd Boast"	0:10
96.	"Burning Social Interest"	0:11
97.	"Whore Torn Vet"	0:10
98.	"Obi Wan Kaczynski"	0:12
99.	"Placing a Personal Memo on the Boss's Desk"	0:13

== ANbRx II: Delta 9 ==
No.	Title	Length
1.	"Pounding Grandma's Sniz Rectal Anarchy"	0:05
2.	"ANb Suppository Rectal Anarchy"	0:11
3.	"DJ Rectal Anarchy"	1:41
4.	"Gratification of the Asshole Rectal Anarchy"	0:11
5.	"Total Fucking Rectal Anarchy"	0:58
6.	"Delta 9 Rectal Anarchy"	1:11
7.	"In Rehab for Addiction to Rectal Anarchy"	0:19
8.	"Tossin' Dick Johnson's Salad Rectal Anarchy"	0:32
9.	"Anarchy in the A.S.O.A. Rectal Anarchy"	1:02
10.	"Lenny Dee Butter Burger Rectal Anarchy"	1:10
11.	"Mouth Full After Mouth Full of Rectal Anarchy"	0:07
12.	"Twelve Days of Rectal Anarchy"	0:23
13.	"From Enslavement to Rectal Anarchy"	0:48
14.	"ANb = Death Rectal Anarchy"	0:17
15.	"Invitation to Rectal Anarchy"	0:24
16.	"Your Bitch Is a Bitch Nigga Rectal Anarchy"	0:34
17.	"Liquid Acid Enema Rectal Anarchy"	1:19
18.	"Another Tortured Witness of Rectal Anarchy"	1:34
19.	"Bad Earache Record Deal Rectal Anarchy"	1:12
20.	"Scream Bloody Gore Beyond Necropsy Rectal Anarchy"	0:17
21.	"Seventies Mondo Cinema Rectal Anarchy"	0:49
22.	"The Future Is Rectal Anarchy"	1:43
23.	"On the White House Lawn Rectal Anarchy"	1:15
24.	"Slamming Your Cock in a Casket Rectal Anarchy"	0:24
25.	"Population Control Is Rectal Anarchy"	0:49
26.	"Jumpin' Yourself in the Shower Rectal Anarchy"	0:57
27.	"Nutz in the Ass, Dick in the Pussy Rectal Anarchy"	0:48
28.	"Shut Down for Unlawful Sodomy Rectal Anarchy"	0:08
