= Arc (EP) =

EP by Agoraphobic Nosebleed
- Released: January 22, 2016
- Recorded: July 2013 – August 2014
- Studio: Visceral Sound
- Genres: Sludge metal, doom metal
- Length: 27:15
- Label: Relapse
- Producer: Scott Hull

Agoraphobic Nosebleed chronology
And on and On... (2011)	Arc (2016)	ANbRX Pharmaceuticals 3 (2017)

Professional ratings
Review scores
Source	Rating
Metal Injection	8/10
Punknews.org	4.5/5 stars

Arc is an EP by Agoraphobic Nosebleed, featuring vocalist Kat Katz. It was released on January 22, 2016 via Relapse Records. It is the first in a 4-part series of EPs representing each individual member of the band's vision and influence.

== Track listing ==
All lyrics are written by Katherine "Kat" Katz; all music is composed by Scott Hull.

No.	Title	Length
1.	"Not a Daughter"	7:00
2.	"Deathbed"	8:32
3.	"Gnaw"	11:43
Total length:		27:15

== Personnel ==
- Katherine "Kat" Katz – vocals
- Scott Hull – guitars, bass, drum programming

=== Production ===
- Scott Hull – recording, mixing, mastering
- Orion Landau – design
- Eric Lacombe – artwork
- Josh Wedin – photography (interior)
