= Season to Risk =

American rock band

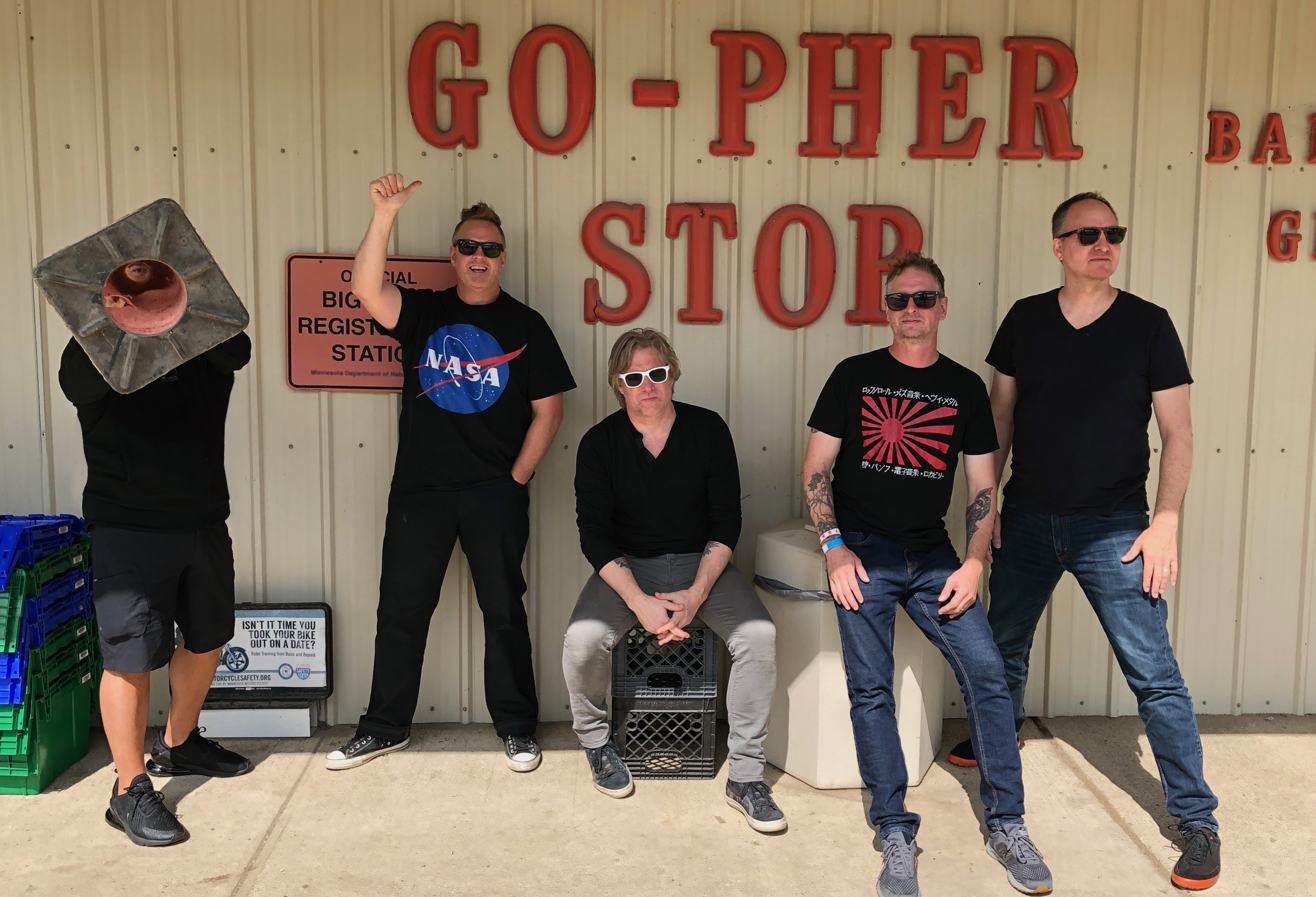

Background information
- Origin: Kansas City, Missouri, U.S.
- Genres: Post-punk, noise rock, alternative rock
- Years active: 1989–present
- Labels: Sony Music Entertainment; Owned & Operated Records; Columbia Records
- Members: Steve Tulipana; Duane Trower; Ben Ruth; David Silver; Wade Williamson
- Website: http://robotswin.com

Season to Risk are an American noise rock/indie rock band hailing from Kansas City, Missouri, United States.

== Early history ==
Season to Risk formed in late 1989 from Kansas City, Missouri punk bands Nine Lives and Curious George, who played together at the Outhouse, a Lawrence, Kansas hardcore venue. Although Season to Risk have had several line-up changes, two founding members have remained constant: Steve Tulipana (lead vocals, guitar) and Duane Trower (lead guitar, keyboards, and vocals). Drummer David Silver joined the band in 1994. Wade Williamson (rhythm guitar and keyboards) joined in 1999, coming from the band Dirtnap. Bass player Ben Ruth began touring with the band in 2024 (and played with Trower in Overstep in the 1990s).

Founding bass player Paul Malinowski played from 1989 - 1995, until he left to join the Kansas City band Shiner. He was replaced on bass in 1995 by Josh Newton, who also plays guitar in Shiner.

The band's genre-bending sound has been defined as post-rock, post-hardcore, math rock, and indie rock. Their constantly changing music has challenged audiences and the record labels they have worked with, with one CMJ reviewer calling it "metal for recovering indie rockers".

The band were signed in 1992 to Red Decibel records in Minneapolis, who then partnered with Columbia Records / Sony, who released their first two albums, during the early 90s post-Nirvana alternative rock band-signing frenzy. Season to Risk toured constantly for their first 15 years, being booked as a young band on shows with Killdozer, Killing Joke, Prong, Fugazi, Corrosion of Conformity, Monster Magnet, and Unsane. They performed a song in a nightclub scene in the 1994 film Strange Days, while living in a trailer on set in Hollywood for two weeks.

They released four albums between 1993 and 2001, at which time they were managed by Stacy Slater at the Talent House in Los Angeles (who also managed 7 Year Bitch and Kool Keith). The master tapes for the band's first two albums were destroyed in the 2008 Universal Studios fire, along with an estimated 150,000 other master tapes.

== Discography ==
The band recorded demos at Sony Studios in NYC, and then lived in Chicago, IL to record their self-titled first album at Soundworks Studio with engineer Jeff Moleski. The self-titled debut Season To Risk (1993) features the songs "Snakes" and "Mine Eyes", and a cover of Neil Young's "Don't Cry". The artwork was designed by Frank Kozik, who had done posters for the band's shows.

Season to Risk wanted a darker sound that reflected their live performance, and recorded In A Perfect World (1995) during the Summer 1994 with Martin Bisi (Sonic Youth, Foetus, Swans). The album had a cover designed by Derek Hess, who designed flyers and posters for the band's shows in Cleveland, OH. Although the record was popular in post-hardcore underground, it had no place on the radio and the band was dropped by Columbia at the end of 1995. Both Hess and Kozik produced limited-edition silkscreen posters of their cover art. Bass player Malinowski left the band to join Shiner in early 1996.

They spent a year building a recording studio in Kansas City, and another year recording their own new music, as well as producing albums for bands Farewell Bend, Casket Lottery, and others with studio partner Joel Hamilton. Men Are Monkeys, Robots Win (1998) was produced in their Trainwreck Recording studio by guitarist Duane Trower and drummer David Silver, and released on Thick Records on CD only. A mastering error caused the CD to be out of phase, and the issue was not corrected until the band reissued the remaster on vinyl in 2019. The recording studio was destroyed by a flash flood which totaled the building one week after it opened to the public. Bass player Josh Newton left the band to join Shiner in 1999.

The Shattering (2001) was produced by Bill Stevenson and Jason Livermore at the Blasting Room in Fort Collins, CO, and released on Descendents' label Owned and Operated Records. This first album as a five-piece was well received and the band toured for several years in support of its release. New bass player Billy Smith (Dirtnap) brought more melody and backing vocals. In the early-2000s the band announced they were "slowing down" to focus on side projects and to develop other careers.

For the next decade, Steve and Billy continued writing songs in a more melodic direction on several Roman Numerals albums and performing with Wade as Thee Water MoccaSins. Billy and Wade performed as Olympic Size, CoNoCo, and Vanish Mode. Steve and Josh released an album and toured as Sie Lieben Maschinen. David moved to the East coast to focus on a publishing career. Duane Trower played guitar with Overstep, Ex-Acrobat, Olivetti Letter and built a new recording studio, Weights and Measures Soundlab, where he has produced many albums including Radkey, Giants Chair, Muscle Worship, and others.

"1-800 MELTDOWN" is a collection of songs written between 1995 and 2024 released by Init Records for Record Store Day 2025. Including their first new music in decades, the album has performances by all of the main band members over the years. In 2025, the band toured extensively across America to support this release with new merch from Bifocal Media.

== Reactivation ==
Still based in Kansas City, the band continued playing select shows each year and touring occasionally, including shows with No Means No (2006), Helmet (2009), Iron Rite Mangle / Molly McGuire (2012), the Medicine Theory (2016), Descendents (2017). Singer Steve Tulipana is the owner/operator of two venues in KCMO, the RecordBar and MiniBar where they often play.

In 2018, Season to Risk began releasing a remastered vinyl reissue series with indie labels and on their Bandcamp page and toured, playing SxSW South By Southwest in Texas and Valley of the Vapors fest in Arkansas, sharing the stage with side project band Sie Lieben Maschinen. In 2019, the band toured the midwest, playing shows at Riot Fest in Chicago and with Porcupine in Minneapolis, supporting a first-ever vinyl release of the album ”The Shattering”, remastered for vinyl by Jason Livermore at Blasting Room studio, Ft. Collins, CO, on limited-edition orange vinyl.

In 2020, Season to Risk re-issued their seminal 1998 album "Men Are Monkeys. Robots Win." remastered by Duane Trower at his studio, Weights and Measures Soundlab, on limited-edition green vinyl. A 2020 tour was postponed due to the Covid-19 pandemic. Their website stated: "Ironically, mentions of the album title are often incorrectly flagged as hate speech by the algorithm on many platforms. Robot wins."

The band released a limited-edition of 100 cassettes / digital compiling a collection of rare singles, B-sides, experiments, cover songs including Bauhaus, The Go-Go's, Killdozer, and others in 2021 titled 1-800-MELTDOWN and played a release show with Descendents and The Menzingers. Season to Risk began recording new music with Duane Trower at his studio Weights and Measures Soundlab in 2022, while they were reunited for shows with Cheer Accident. Shows followed in 2023 with Man or Astroman and in 2024 with Sleepytime Gorilla Museum, Traindodge, and Cherubs.

In February 2025, a Record Store Day exclusive vinyl edition of the 1-800-MELTDOWN album was announced by Init Records. The band released a new single and lyric video "Echo Chamber" which was featured on Decibel magazine, and toured in April - May with a new primary line up including bass player Ben Ruth (Be/Non). They stayed active through 2025, touring again in November and December to support the release of the 30-year anniversary remastered album "In A Perfect World" on Spartan Records (Seattle, WA). Season to Risk toured with the band "sisters", featuring Mario Quintaro from Spotlights and Jason Blackmore from Molly McGuire. The vinyl was released with three color variants, and featured in RecordStoreDay's Black Friday 2025 event. The album was re-mastered by Duane Trower and Weights at Measures Sound Lab and had updated artwork featuring early sketches of Derek Hess' drawings included in the liner notes.

In 2026, the band announced a Midwest tour including the opening night at Caterwaul in Minneapolis with Mike Watt and Didjits in June and shows with Unsane in the Fall.

== Members ==
- Steve Tulipana - Vocals, guitar, synthesizer (1989–present)
- Duane Trower - Guitar, backup vocals, synthesizer, engineering (1989–present)
- David Silver - Drums, synth oscillator, metal, drum machine (1994–present)
- Wade Williamson - Guitar, synths, keyboard (1999–present)
- Ben Ruth - bass, vocals (2024 - present)

== Former members ==
- Paul Malinowski - Bass (1989-1995)
- Josh Newton - Bass (1995-1998)
- Billy Smith - Bass, vocals, guitar, synth (1999–2024)
- Jason Gerken - Drums on "Perfect World" (1994)
- Tim Dow - Drums (live 1990, 1992, 1994)
- Chris Metcalf - Drums (live 2003-2009)
- Chad Sabin - Drums (live 1992-1994)
- Peter Murray - Drums on "eponymous"(1991-1992)
- Chris Sharp - Bass (live 1999)
- Loren Chambers - Drums (early demos)
- Frank Garymartin - Drums (live 1994)
- Mike Myers - Drums (live 2002)
- Jerry Bayton - Drums (live 1990)

== Discography ==
=== Studio albums ===
- Season to Risk (Columbia Records, 1993)
- In a Perfect World (Columbia Records, 1995)
- Men are Monkeys, Robots Win (Thick Records, 1998)
- The Shattering (Owned & Operated Records, 2001)
- 1-800-Meltdown (Init Records, 2025)
- In a Perfect World Remastered (Spartan Records, 2025)

=== Singles and EPs ===
- Mine Eyes/Snakes (Red Decibel/Columbia Records, 1992)
- Biter/Oil (Red Decibel/Columbia Records, 1992)
- Undone split with Glazed Baby (Self-released AFFA Records, 1996)
- Beestings and Poison Eggs split /w Starkweather(Supermodel Records, 1998)
- Ace of Space split with Molly McGuire (-ismist Recordings, 1999)
