= Bridges to Burn =

Studio album by 16
- Released: January 20, 2009
- Recorded: 2008
- Genre: Sludge metal
- Length: 46:34
- Label: Relapse
- Producer: 16

16 chronology
Zoloft Smile (2003)	Bridges to Burn (2009)	Deep Cuts from Dark Clouds (2012)

Professional ratings
Review scores
Source	Rating
Rock Sound	8/10 stars
AllMusic	3.5/5 stars
Metal Temple	7/10 stars

Bridges to Burn is an album by American sludge metal band 16. It was released January 20, 2009 through Relapse Records.

== Overview ==
Bridges to Burn is the fifth studio album released by 16, released in the United States on the band's 16th anniversary on January 20, 2009. The album also marked the first official release of new music from the band in seven years. It was the follow-up to 2002's Zoloft Smile.

The band released the song "Skin and Bones" as the first preview track to their official MySpace page which was soon followed by the tracks "So Broken Down" and "Man Interrupted". Soon after the official release date, the band streamed the album in its entirety at BridgesToBurn.com. The artwork was done by Florian Bertmer.

== Track listing ==
All songs written and arranged by 16.

No.	Title	Length
1.	"Throw in the Towel"	3:21
2.	"Skin and Bones"	3:53
3.	"Me and My Shadow"	5:03
4.	"Man, Interrupted"	2:40
5.	"Flake"	3:53
6.	"You Let Me Down (Again)"	3:28
7.	"Monday Bloody Monday"	3:41
8.	"Permanent Good One"	4:22
9.	"So Broken Down"	3:36
10.	"Thorn in Your Side"	4:06
11.	"What Went Wrong"	3:57
12.	"Missed the Boat"	4:34

== Personnel ==
- Cris Jerue – vocals
- Bobby Ferry – guitar
- Tony Baumeister – bass
- Jason Corley – drums

=== Production ===
- Produced by 16
- Engineered and mixed by Jeff Forrest
- Mastered by Scott Hull
