= Bestial Machinery (Discography Volume 1) =

Compilation album by Agoraphobic Nosebleed
- Released: 2005
- Recorded: 1995–1998
- Genre: Grindcore
- Length: 78:41
- Label: Relapse
- Producer: Scott Hull

Agoraphobic Nosebleed chronology
Altered States of America (2003)	Bestial Machinery (Discography Volume 1) (2005)	PCP Torpedo/ANbRx (2006)

Bestial Machinery (Discography Volume 1) is a double-CD anthology by the American grindcore band Agoraphobic Nosebleed. The album contains all of the material the group recorded prior to their Relapse Records full-length album Honky Reduction, much of which was only released on vinyl 7-inch EPs or compilations.

Although the total playing time of the album could fit on a single compact disc, a technical restriction—the fact that a maximum of 99 tracks could be programmed onto a single CD—forced Relapse to split the 136 songs between two CDs. The first disc contains all of Agoraphobic Nosebleed's EP and split releases, while the second contains the band's first demo and all of their compilation tracks, plus thirteen previously unreleased songs. The front cover was done by German artist Florian Bertmer.

== Track listing ==
All songs written and composed by Agoraphobic Nosebleed except where indicated.

=== Disc one ===
1. "5% Control"
2. "Scrutinized"
3. "Prey for Death / Hollowpoint / Conform to... Death / Life Is Pain / Profit Is the Motive"
4. "Snake Charmer"
5. "Chasing a Dream"
6. "Allegiance"
7. "Information"
8. "Loss for Words"
9. "Your Insecurity"
10. "Rich Get Richer"
11. "Ode to a Junkie"
12. "Crawl of the Mind"
13. "What I Did on My Summer Vacation"
14. "One More Drink"
15. "Forgotten in Space" (Voivod cover)
16. "Letter Bomb"
17. "El Topo"
18. "Vapor Lock"
19. "Victims as Dogs"
20. "Dead Above the Neck"
21. "The Executioner vs. the Sodomite"
22. "From Above"
23. "Green Inferno"
24. "100 Dead Rabbits"
25. "Circle of Shit"
26. "Amputee"
27. "Eight Girls Instead of Nine"
28. "Sex on the Flag"
29. "The Newlyweds Are Raped"
30. "Mule"
31. "10,000 Bullets"
32. "Centipede"
33. "Lithium Daydream"
34. "Doubled Over"
35. "Suicide Note #1"
36. "From Filth to Defilement"
37. "Who Can Wreck the Infinite"
38. "Morphine Constipation"
39. "Unholy BMX Fights the Nod (Morphine Constipation Remix)"
40. "Exceptional Waste"
41. "Fat Fucking Chance"
42. "Holy Mountain"
43. "Sweetback"
44. "Arrival of Bees"
45. "Where You Like"
46. "Powertrip"
47. "Worthless"
48. "Pain in Living"
49. "Lose Your Will"
50. "Unbelievable Stress"
51. "Another Useless Asshole"
52. "My Life Is a Money Pit"
53. "Debilitating Headache"
54. "Powerfall"
55. "Paradigm"
56. "The Power of Dolemite"
57. "Cut to Happy Hour"
58. "Military Scientist"
59. "Kool-Aid Feedbag"
60. "The Big Fuck You"
61. "Computer Lethargy"
62. "Non-Action"
63. "Anti-septic"
64. "Hessian Bodyfarm"
65. "Solvent"
66. "Glade, a Straw, and a Sandwich Bag"
67. "Headglass"
68. "DC5"
69. "Hungry Child" (C.O.C. cover)
70. "I'd Rather Be Sleeping" (D.R.I. cover)
71. "I Don't Need Society" (D.R.I. cover)
72. "Black Ass, White Dick"
73. "Black Market Blastbeats"
74. "Death Takes a Shit 2 (Assnuke)"
75. "Ketamine and Kryptonite"
76. "Pud Rock"

=== Disc two ===
1. "Hammer Fight"
2. "Gravework"
3. "Can You Dig?"
4. "Retardo Montalbon"
5. "Death Takes a Shit"
6. "Panic Gasp"
7. "Hooker Bomb"
8. "Pigs Smell Fear"
9. "Fuck Your Soccer Mom"
10. "Baby Cannon"
11. "You Have No Rights"
12. "Just a Band"
13. "Obscene"
14. "Gorrendously Mutilated"
15. "Habitrail for Humanity"
16. "Inappropriate Response"
17. "Nickel Plated Knuckle Fuck"
18. "Recovering Contraband from a Constricted Airway"
19. "Nice Ass"
20. "Pinkworld"
21. "Hysterical Misery"
22. "My Own Rules"
23. "Intro"
24. "Mobilize"
25. "Measure the Bite Marks"
26. "7.5%"
27. "The Alcoholic Pain"
28. "Eyes Like Two Pissholes in the Snow"
29. "Pediatric Burn Unit"
30. "I Smell Really Bad"
31. "Ten Fucking Steps"
32. "The Grief That Summer Brings"
33. "Driven to Succeed"
34. "So Many Car Phones, So Few Bullets"
35. "McCarthy Witch Hunt"
36. "The River"
37. "Harvey"
38. "Hate Disguised as Legislation"
39. "Fucking Move, Prick"
40. "The Pros and Cons of the CIA"
41. "Scare Tactics"
42. "If You Thought Elvis"
43. "Disease Bomb"
44. "Gratuitous Wound Photos"
45. "Broken Political Wing"
46. "Full Metal Swimsuit"
47. "Swimming in the LaBrea Tar Pits"
48. "Tough Guy Bullshit"
49. "I Feel Dumb"
50. "Ritalin Attack"
51. "Absolutely No Samples"
52. "Silence"
53. "Driven to Succeed 2"
54. "Bloated and Complacent"
55. "Privy to War"
56. "Typical Tough Guy Bullshit"
57. "Man's Hate" (Sore Throat cover)
58. "I Gave You My Life"
59. "Control" (Napalm Death cover)
60. "Ladies and Gentlemen"

== Track sources ==
=== Disc one ===
- Tracks 1–18 taken from split LP with Cattlepress (Bovine Records)
- Track 3 also appears on the compilation Grind in the Mind (Bovine Records/Satan's Pimp Records)
- Tracks 19–30 taken from eponymous 7-inch EP (Clean Plate Records)
- Tracks 31–39 taken from split 7-inch EP with Benümb (Relapse Records)
- Tracks 40–49 taken from split 7-inch EP with Enemy Soil (Bovine Records)
- Tracks 50–56 taken from split 7-inch EP with Laceration (Satan's Pimp Records)
- Tracks 57–63 taken from split 7-inch EP with Gob (Bad Card Records)
- Tracks 64–76 taken from the limited Honky Reduction reissue 7-inch bonus EP The Glue That Binds Us (Regurgitated Semen Records)

=== Disc two ===
All tracks previously unreleased except for:

- Track 3 from the compilation Bllleeeeaaauuurrrrgghhh!: A Music War (Slap-A-Ham Records)
- Track 5 from the compilation Audio Terrorism (Satan's Pimp Records/Chaotic Noise Productions)
- Track 6 from the compilation Accidental Double Homicide (Satan's Pimp Records)
- Tracks 8–9 from the compilation Cry Now, Cry Later Vol. 2 (Pessimiser Records)
- Tracks 11 and 22 from the compilation Speed Freaks 2 (Knot Records)
- Track 12 from the compilation Monsters in My Head (Big City Bastards)
- Tracks 23–53 taken from the band's untitled demo, later reissued as a 7-inch (Chaotic Noise Productions/Bovine Records)
- Tracks 54–60 taken from the Earfull of Shit compilation (Chaotic Noise Productions)

== Personnel ==
- Jay Randall – vocals
- Scott Hull – guitar, bass, drum programming, vocals

=== Additional vocalists ===
- Aaron Morrisette (Disc 1 – 1–18)
- Sean Wipfle
- Richard Johnson
- Jason Hedges
- Nate Mastablasta Miller
- Sherwood Webber
- Dom
