= Jesuit (band) =

American hardcore punk band

- Origin: Virginia Beach, Virginia, U.S.
- Genres: Hardcore punk, sludge, mathcore
- Years active: 1995–1999, 2011
- Labels: Reservoir; Hydra Head; Magic Bullet

Jesuit was an American hardcore punk band from Virginia Beach, Virginia. Active in the mid and late 1990s, the group released twelve songs but disbanded before recording a full-length album.

In 2011, Jesuit played reunion shows and released the compilation album Discography, which includes remastered versions of all of the band's songs.

== History ==
=== Original run (1995–99) ===
Jesuit formed in 1995 with drummer Jason Howard, bassist Brett Matthews, and guitarists Nate Newton (ex-Channel) and Kelly Posadas. The band's demo, a three-song EP, was recorded by Bob Gurske and self-released on cassette.

In 1996, the group released a self-titled three-song EP, produced by Kurt Ballou, on 7" vinyl through Reservoir Records. The same year, a CD was released on Reservoir which includes eight songs: the three songs from the 7", two additional songs from the same recording session, and the three songs from Jesuit's demo tape. In December 1996, Jesuit embarked on a tour which took them into Canada for a week's worth of shows in Ontario with Canadian grindcore band Acrid. Jesuit and Acrid teamed up again in July 1997 for a full tour across the Midwest, Northeast, and East Coast of the United States.

Before their next recording session in winter 1998, Kelly Posadas left the band and was replaced by guitarist Brian Benoit. Jesuit toured North America with Botch and The Dillinger Escape Plan, and was included on Volume 4 of the Black Sabbath 7" tribute series In These Black Days, contributing a cover version of the song "Hole in the Sky". In 1999, the group released another self-titled three-song EP – again produced by Ballou – on 7" vinyl through Hydra Head Records. Despite plans to record an album, Jesuit disbanded in 1999.

After the break up, Nate Newton and Brian Benoit moved to Massachusetts and New Jersey respectively, and either joined or formed new bands. Newton would go on to perform in Converge, Old Man Gloom, Doomriders, and later, Cave In. Benoit performed with The Dillinger Escape Plan until severe nerve damage in his arm made it difficult for him to play his instrument.

=== Reunion (2011) ===
In November 2010, Jesuit announced their intent to reform for concerts in 2011, and also release a collective anthology of the group's early releases which had all gone out of print. Magic Bullet Records released Jesuit's Discography in April 2011; the compilation album featured the group's two EPs, demo tape, and Black Sabbath cover in reverse chronological order. The songs were remixed by Kurt Ballou at GodCity Studios, remastered by Jeff Lipton and Jessica Thompson at Peerless Studios, and the packaging featured newly designed artwork by Florian Bertmer and Brent Eyestone.

On April 9, 2011 Jesuit performed their first show in over a decade, opening for the recently reformed bands Unbroken and Indecision at the Santos Party House club in New York City. Jesuit also performed at Virginia's Best Friends Day festival in August 2011.

== Band members ==
- Jason Howard – drums (1995–1999, 2011)
- Brett Matthews – bass, vocals (1995–1999, 2011)
- Nate Newton – guitar, vocals (1995–1999, 2011)
- Kelly Posadas – guitar, vocals (1995–1997, 2011)
- Brian Benoit – guitar (1997–1999, 2011)

== Discography ==
=== Compilation album ===
Title	Release details	Notes
Discography	Released: April 12, 2011; Label: Magic Bullet (MBL127); Formats: LP+7", CD, DL	Consists of remixed and remastered versions of all twelve songs from Jesuit's discography. Reissued in 2021 by Dark Operative (OPS039).

=== Extended plays ===
Title	Release details	Notes
Demo	Released: 1996; Label: self-released; Format: Cassette	Demo recording. The songs were later released on the CD version of Jesuit (1996) and on Discography.
Jesuit	Released: 1996; Label: Reservoir (RSVR-018, RSVR021); Formats: 7", CD	The 7" consists of three songs. The CD version added five additional songs, including all three tracks from Jesuit's demo. All songs were later released on Discography.
Jesuit	Released: 1999; Label: Hydra Head (HH666-32); Format: 7"	Jacob Bannon provided backing vocals. The songs were later released on Discography.

=== Other appearances ===
Song	Year	Compilation	Label	Notes
"Cannonizing"	1996	Kingdom Live '96	Rustie (#1)	Live recording. This track is only available on this release.
"Hole in the Sky"	1999	In These Black Days Volume 4	Hydra Head (HH666-15)	Cover of a Black Sabbath song. This track was later released on Discography.
