= Lifespan of a Moth =

Studio album by 16
- Released: July 15, 2016
- Recorded: 2016
- Genre: Sludge metal
- Length: 44:15
- Label: Relapse
- Producer: Jeff Forrest

16 chronology
Deep Cuts from Dark Clouds (2012)	Lifespan of a Moth (2016)

Lifespan of a Moth is an album by American sludge metal band 16. It was released July 15, 2016 through Relapse Records.

== Overview ==
On May 18, 2016, Stereogum premiered a new track from The Lifespan of a Moth, "The Absolute Center of a Pitch Black Heart".

On June 9, 2016, Decibel premiered 16's video for "Peaches, Cream and the Placenta". Guitarist Bobby Ferry said of the track, "The song is a stressed-out walk down a well-trodden trail that we have been prancing down since the early '90s. The lyrics delicately touch with all thumbs on the subject of addictive personality sorcery that creates unintended helpless victims." The video was directed by longtime 16 collaborator and producer, Jeff Forrest.

== Track listing ==
No.	Title	Length
1.	"Landloper"	5:03
2.	"Peaches, Cream and the Placenta"	5:57
3.	"The Morphinist"	5:14
4.	"The Absolute Center of a Pitch Black Heart"	3:25
5.	"Gallows Humor"	7:36
6.	"Secrets of the Curmudgeon"	4:21
7.	"Pastor in a Coma"	5:38
8.	"George"	7:01

== Personnel ==
- Cris Jerue – vocals
- Bobby Ferry – guitar
- Barney Firks – bass
- Dion Thurman – drums

=== Production ===
- Produced by 16 and Jeff Forrest
- Engineered and mixed by Jeff Forrest
