= Discography (Jesuit album) =

Compilation album by Jesuit
- Released: April 12, 2011
- Recorded: 1996–1998
- Genre: Hardcore punk
- Length: 46:29
- Label: Magic Bullet (MBL127)
- Producer: Kurt Ballou

Jesuit chronology
Jesuit (1999)	Discography (2011)

Discography is a compilation album by American rock band Jesuit. Released on April 12, 2011, through Magic Bullet Records, the album features every song recorded by the hardcore punk group during their tenure in the mid and late 1990s. Jesuit released a demo tape, two self-titled EPs, and a Black Sabbath cover before disbanding.

In 2021, Discography was reissued by Dark Operative for Jesuit's 25th anniversary.

== Reception ==
Professional ratings
Review scores
Source	Rating
Sputnikmusic	4/5 stars

Shawn Macomber of Decibel magazine awarded the album a 9 out of 10 rating, describing it as "a beautifully remastered collection documenting the all-too-fleeting existence of one of the seminal bands that made post-post-hardcore's mid-'90s vicious turn so darkly exhilarating." Writing for RVA Magazine, Marilyn Drew Necci said "Jesuit’s music stands the test of time better than the vast majority of their contemporaries" and that "the remastering job also aids the songs immeasurably". Bob, staff writer for the online magazine Scene Point Blank, said "the lack of any real mention by the current hardcore crowd (be it listeners, bands, media, etc) has rendered [Jesuit] a true overlooked powerhouse". He gave Discography a rating of 8.5 out of 10, calling it "one hell of a release (bordering on 'should be classic') that needs to be heard just short of immediately."

In a less favorable review, Joseph Schafer of Invisible Oranges wrote "the only reason [Discography] exists in this compiled and remastered form, gorgeous artwork and all, is because bassist Nate Newton and guitarist Brian Benoit went on to join Converge and The Dillinger Escape Plan, respectively." He called the cover of Black Sabbath's "Hole in the Sky" the "best song" on the album, and said "after listening to it, I'd put money down that Converge and Dillinger's track record of incredible covers originates from Benoit and Newton."

== Track listing ==
All tracks are written by Jesuit, except where noted

No.	Title	Original release (Year)	Length
1.	"The Carcrash Lullabye"	Jesuit (1999)	2:58
2.	"Your Sharp Teeth"	Jesuit (1999)	3:44
3.	"Cop Glasses"	Jesuit (1999)	6:39
4.	"Hole in the Sky" (originally by Black Sabbath)	In These Black Days Volume 4 (1999)	3:48
5.	"Servitude 101"	Jesuit (1996)	3:35
6.	"The Malady"	Jesuit (1996)	3:28
7.	"Suicide King"	Jesuit (1996)	4:37
8.	"Tranzor Z"	Jesuit (1996)	3:19
9.	"The Smooth Talking Son of a Bitch"	Jesuit (1996)	3:28
10.	"Trigger"	Untitled demo	2:44
11.	"Canonize"	Untitled demo	3:13
12.	"Expatriate"	Untitled demo	4:56

== Personnel ==
Discography personnel as listed in CD liner notes.

Jesuit

- Brian Benoit – guitar (tracks 1–4)
- J. How – drums
- Brett Matthews – vocals, bass
- Nate Newton – vocals, guitar
- Kelly Posadas – vocals, guitar (tracks 5–12)

Additional musicians

- Jacob Bannon – backing vocals on Jesuit (1999)

Production and recording history

- Kurt Ballou – tracks 1–4 recorded at God City 2 in the winter of 1998; tracks 5–9 recorded at God City 1 on September 2, 1996; tracks 1–12 remixed at God City 4 in the winter of 2006
- Bob Gurske – tracks 10–12 recorded at Wintersound
- Jeff Lipton – tracks 1–12 remastered at Peerless Mastering on January 4, 2007
- Jessica Thompson – tracks 1–12 remastered at Peerless Mastering on January 4, 2007

Artwork and packaging

- Florian Bertmer – cover art illustration
- Brent Eyestoen – layout and design, photographs
- Jason Hellman – photographs
- Dave Mandel – photographs
- Jay Newman – photographs
- Mike Dailey – photographs
- Mike Haley – photographs
- Nate Newton – photographs
- Kelly Posadas – photographs
- Brett Mathews – photographs
- "Various friends and roadies along the way" – photographs
