= Deep Cuts from Dark Clouds =

Studio album by 16
- Released: April 24, 2012
- Recorded: 2011
- Genre: Sludge metal
- Length: 40:01
- Label: Relapse
- Producer: Jeff Forrest

16 chronology
Bridges to Burn (2009)	Deep Cuts from Dark Clouds (2012)	Lifespan of a Moth (2016)

Deep Cuts from Dark Clouds is the sixth album by American sludge metal band 16. It is the band's second release with Relapse Records. The album marks the band's last collaboration with bassist Tony Baumeister, and the band's only recording with drummer Mateo.

== Track listing ==
No.	Title	Length
1.	"Theme from 'Pillpopper'"	3:41
2.	"Parasite"	3:51
3.	"Her Little 'Accident'"	4:16
4.	"The Sad Clown"	3:06
5.	"Ants in My Bloodstream"	4:34
6.	"Broom Pusher"	3:11
7.	"Opium Hook"	4:26
8.	"Bowels of a Baby Killer"	4:51
9.	"Beyond Fixable"	3:40
10.	"Only Photographs Remain"	4:23

== Personnel ==
- Cris Jerue – vocals
- Bobby Ferry – guitar
- Tony Baumeister – bass
- Mateo – drums

=== Production ===
- Produced, engineered and mixed by Jeff Forrest
- Mastered by Scott Hull
- Artwork and design by Orion Landau
