= Jeff Gaither =

Graphic artist

Jeff Gaither (born 1960) is a graphic artist noted for his many pictures for the music industry.

Gaither has been practicing his particular blend of horror and rock art for over 25 years. He has created art for The Misfits, Guns N' Roses, Look Afraid, The Undead, Biohazard, Insane Clown Posse, Accused and many more bands of all genres. He blames it all on his aunt, who in his youth bought him copies of Famous Monsters of Filmland, and took him to movies like The Exorcist and Night of the Living Dead. Jeff is a visual artist, digital artist, photographer, sculptor.

== Major accomplishments and relevant contributions ==
- Created art for an estimated 300+ music CD covers
- Created art for 2500+ magazine/fanzine covers
- Art appears worldwide on posters, prints, clothing, skateboards, skis, glassware, stickers, magazines, book covers, and more
- Art published in Art of Modern Rock: The Poster Explosion, 2004
