= The Poacher Diaries =

Studio album by Agoraphobic Nosebleed and Converge
- Released: 1999
- Recorded: 1999
- Studio: Oblivion Studios, Upper Marlboro, Massachusetts (Agoraphobic Nosebleed); God City, Norwood, Massachusetts (Converge)
- Genre: Grindcore; metalcore; hardcore punk
- Length: 34:56 (The Poacher Diaries); 20:57 (The Poacher Diaries Redux)
- Label: Relapse

Agoraphobic Nosebleed chronology
| Split with Gob (1998) | The Poacher Diaries (1999) | Split with Benümb (2001) |

Converge chronology
| When Forever Comes Crashing (1998) | The Poacher Diaries (1999) | Deeper the Wound (2001) |

Professional ratings
Review scores
| Source | Rating |
|---|---|
| Alternative Press | 4/5 stars |
| Allmusic | 4/5 stars |
| The Encyclopedia of Popular Music | 3/5 stars |
| Sputnikmusic | 4/5 stars |

The Poacher Diaries is a split album released by the bands Agoraphobic Nosebleed and Converge in 1999. It was remastered by Scott Hull in 2006 and re-released by Relapse Records.

In 2022, the Converge songs were reissued as a standalone EP, The Poacher Diaries Redux, with mixing by Kurt Ballou, remastering by Alan Douches, and a new artwork by Randy Ortiz inspired by the original Derek Hess artwork.

== Track listing ==
=== The Poacher Diaries ===
Agoraphobic Nosebleed

1. "Mantis" – 1:26
2. "Center of the Hive" – 1:13
3. "Glass Tornado" – 1:02
4. "Landfills of Extinct Possibility" – 1:11
5. "Pentagram Constellation" – 2:18
6. "Bed of Flies" – 1:01
7. "Destroyed" – 1:07
8. "Gringo" – 1:19
9. "Infected Womb" – 2:59

Converge

10. "Locust Reign" – 1:28
11. "This Is Mine" – 1:34
12. "They Stretch for Miles" – 4:26
13. "My Great Devastator" – 5:00
14. "The Human Shield" – 3:45
15. "Minnesota" – 5:07

=== The Poacher Diaries Redux ===
Converge

1. "Locust Reign" – 1:24
2. "This Is Mine" – 1:32
3. "They Stretch for Miles" – 4:10
4. "My Great Devastator" – 4:54
5. "The Human Shield" – 3:44
6. "Minnesota" – 5:13

== Personnel ==
=== Agoraphobic Nosebleed ===
- J.R. Hayes – vocals
- Scott Hull – guitar, drum programming
- Jay Randall – vocals, electronics

=== Converge ===
- Kurt Ballou – guitar, vocals
- Aaron Dalbec – guitar, vocals
- John Digiorgio – drums
- Nate Newton – bass guitar, vocals
- Jacob Bannon – vocals
