= Honky Reduction =

Studio album by Agoraphobic Nosebleed
- Released: February 24, 1998
- Genre: Grindcore
- Length: 17:46
- Label: Relapse
- Producer: Scott Hull

Agoraphobic Nosebleed chronology
Agoraphobic Nosebleed (1997)	Honky Reduction (1998)	PCP Torpedo (1998)

Professional ratings
Review scores
Source	Rating
AllMusic	3/5 stars

Honky Reduction is the first studio album by grindcore band Agoraphobic Nosebleed.

== Track listing ==
No.	Title	Length
1.	"Black Ink on Black Paper"	0:29
2.	"Polished Turd"	0:20
3.	"Filthy Murder Shack"	0:20
4.	"The Withering of Skin"	0:29
5.	"Empowerment"	0:34
6.	"The House of Feasting"	1:00
7.	"Die and Get the Fuck Out of the Way"	0:40
8.	"Insipid Conversations"	0:27
9.	"Vexed"	0:41
10.	"Circus Mutt (Three Ring Inferno)"	1:17
11.	"Lives Ruined Through Sex (For Anita)"	1:05
12.	"Clawhammer and an Ether Rag (For Bill)"	0:35
13.	"NYC Always Reminds Me"	0:30
14.	"Her Despair Reeks of Alcohol"	0:56
15.	"Chump Slap"	0:21
16.	"Burned Away in Sleep"	0:24
17.	"Grief Is Not Quantifiable"	0:27
18.	"Cloved in Twain"	1:17
19.	"Torn Apart by Dingos"	0:31
20.	"Pagan Territories"	0:51
21.	"Hat Full of Shit (For Cletus)"	0:23
22.	"McWorld"	0:18
23.	"How Sean Threw His Back Out Sneezing"	0:27
24.	"Bones in One Bag (Organs in Another)"	0:16
25.	"Acute Awareness (For Wood)"	3:03
26.	"Two Shits to the Moon"	0:08

== Personnel ==
- Scott Hull – guitar, programming
- Jay Randall – vocals, noise
