= Agoraphobic Nosebleed =

American grindcore band

- Also known as: Surgical Dysfunctions
- Origin: Springfield, Massachusetts, United States
- Genre: Cybergrind
- Years active: 1994–present
- Members: Scott Hull; Jay Randall; Richard Johnson; John Jarvis
- Past members: Katherine Katz; Carl Shultz; J.R. Hayes

Agoraphobic Nosebleed (ANb) is an American grindcore band. Its line-up has changed often over the years, with guitarist and drum programmer Scott Hull being the only continuous member. The current line-up includes vocalist Jay Randall, Richard Johnson of Enemy Soil and Drugs of Faith, and John Jarvis of Fulgora on bass guitar.

== History ==
Agoraphobic Nosebleed formed in 1994 as Surgical Dysfunctions in Springfield, Massachusetts, United States, but that same year they changed it to the current moniker. They are known for rarely playing live, having played at the 2003 New England Metal and Hardcore Festival as an unscheduled appearance. The band Pig Destroyer cut its set short so Agoraphobic Nosebleed could play two songs and an intro. Twelve years later, the band finally played their first full live set at the 2015 edition of the Maryland Deathfest. Their second full live set was played on November 15, 2015, at the Housecore Horror Festival Part III in San Antonio, TX. In keeping with the band's aesthetic, no live drummer has been used at the performances.

In 2006, Hydra Head Records reissued Agoraphobic Nosebleed's 6" PCP Torpedo as a double disc set entitled PCP Torpedo/ANbRx. The first disc consists of the 10-song, 6-minute original EP. The second disc is over an hour's worth of remixes of songs from PCP Torpedo by breakcore and noise music artists such as Xanopticon, James Plotkin, Merzbow, and Justin Broadrick.

In 2009, the band released the album Agorapocalypse on Relapse, available as a CD, LP, and longbox CD. The split 7-inch with Crom was released a month later. In 2010, the band released a split 7-inch with The Endless Blockade for Relapse Records and a split 5" with A.N.S. for Tankcrimes Records. A split CD/LP with Despise You was released on Relapse in 2011. The December 2011 issue of Decibel Magazine included a flexi disc titled Make a Joyful Noise, and the December 2012 issue included a flexi disc containing the song "Merry Chrystmeth".

Agoraphobic Nosebleed is recording four EPs, each written in the preferred style of a specific member. Kat Katz's EP, Arc, was released in 2016. Randall is currently working on Drum Machine Gun 2, as well as doing a collaborative 7-inch with Wadge and a collaborative 12-inch with Black Mayonnaise.

On October 24, 2018, Kat Katz announced their departure from Agoraphobic Nosebleed due to "being bullied by dudes". The remaining band members denied this, but supported Katz leaving due to irreconcilable differences.

== Musical style ==
Agoraphobic Nosebleed is one of the most well-known drum-machine grindcore bands, and has influenced many drum-machine grindcore bands. They are known for the brevity of their songs. The album Altered States of America features 100 songs (including one hidden) in just under 22 minutes, with many songs of 5 seconds or less, and the longest song being only 1:45.

== Personnel ==
=== Current members ===
- Scott Hull (Pig Destroyer, ex-Anal Cunt, ex-Japanese Torture Comedy Hour) – guitar, drum programming
- Jay Randall (ex-Isis, Japanese Torture Comedy Hour, Seal Team 666) – vocals, electronics
- Richard Johnson (Enemy Soil, Drugs of Faith, Jesus of Nazareth) – vocals, formerly bass guitar
- John Jarvis (ex-Pig Destroyer, Scour, Fulgora) – bass guitar

=== Former members ===
- Joe – vocals (1995–1996)
- Dom – vocals (1995–1996)
- Aaron Ulcer – vocals (1997)
- Sean Wipfli – vocals (1997)
- J.R. Hayes – vocals (1999)
- Carl Schultz – vocals (2002–2007)
- Katherine Katz – vocals (2007–2018)

== Discography ==
=== Studio albums ===
- Honky Reduction (1998)
- Frozen Corpse Stuffed with Dope (2002)
- Altered States of America (2003)
- Agorapocalypse (2009)

=== Other releases ===
- 30 Song Demo cassette (1995)
- Agoraphobic Nosebleed 7-inch (1996) (Bovine Records)
- Split with Cattlepress LP (1997)
- Split with Enemy Soil 7-inch (1997)
- Split with Laceration 7-inch (1997)
- Agoraphobic Nosebleed 7-inch (1997) (Clean Plate Records)
- PCP Torpedo 6" (1998)
- Split with Gob 7-inch (1998)
- The Glue That Binds Us 7-inch (2006)
- The Poacher Diaries split with Converge CD/LP (1999)
- Split with Benümb 7-inch (2001)
- Split with Halo 7-inch (2002)
- Bestial Machinery (Discography Volume 1) 2xCD (2005)
- PCP Torpedo/ANbRx 2xCD (2006)
- Split with Kill the Client 7-inch (2007)
- A Clockwork Sodom 7-inch (2007)
- Domestic Powerviolence split with Apartment 213 CD/LP (2007)
- Split with Total Fucking Destruction 7-inch (2007)
- Altered States of America/ANbRx II 2xCD (2008)
- Split with Insect Warfare 5"/mini-CD (2008)
- Split with Crom 7-inch (2009)
- Split with Endless Blockade 7-inch (2009)
- Split with A.N.S. 5" (2010)
- And on and On... split with Despise You CD/LP (2011)
- Make a Joyful Noise flexi disc (2011)
- "Merry Chrystmeth" flexi disc (2012)
- The Honkey Reduxtion EP flexi disc (2015)
- Arc CD/12" (2016)
- ANbRX Pharmaceuticals 3 with Dental Work CDr (2017)
