= 16 (band) =

American sludge metal band

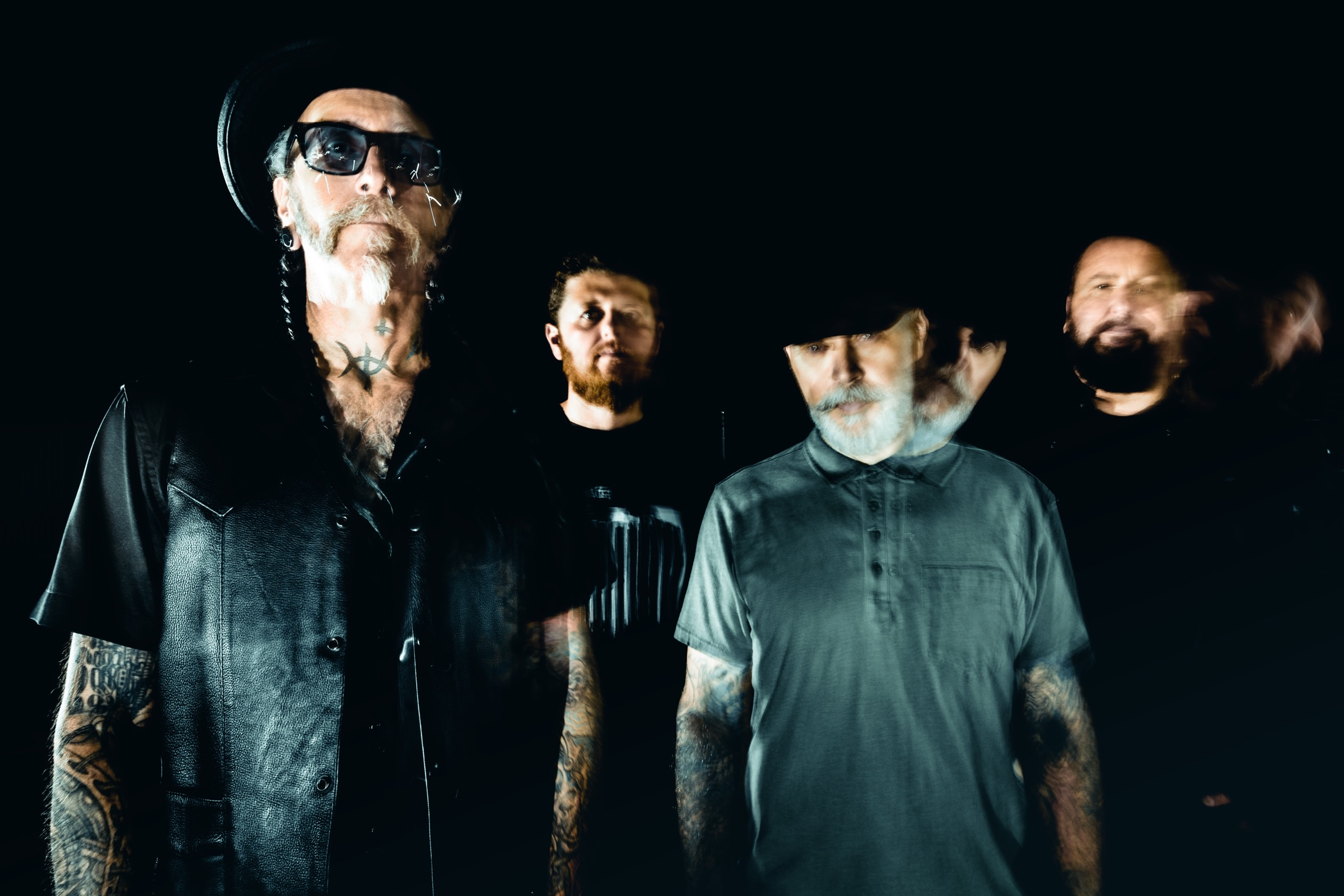
- 16 in 2022

Background information
- Origin: Los Angeles, California, U.S.
- Genre: Sludge metal
- Years active: 1992–2004, 2007–present
- Labels: Relapse; At a Loss; Bastardizer; Bacteria Sour; Last Hurrah; Pessimiser/Theologian; Pushead Fanclub; Standard; MP3.com; Heavy Psych Sounds
- Members: Bobby Ferry; Alex Shuster; Dion Thurman; Barney Firks
- Website: 16theband.bandcamp.com

16, stylized as -(16)-, is an American sludge metal band from Los Angeles, California. The band is currently signed to Relapse Records. In February 2025, the band released their tenth full-length album, Guides for the Misguided.

== History ==
=== Formation and Curves That Kick (1992–1994) ===
16 was formed in Santa Ana, California by Bobby Ferry (guitar), Cris Jerue (vocals), Ben Clark (bass) and Jason Corley (drums) in 1992. According to Ferry, he and Jerue bonded as part of the Southern California skate scene. Ferry has stated band was originally called 15, but changed their name when they were made aware of a previously existing group called Fifteen, who had been signed to Lookout Records. Ferry also named some of the band's early influences, including 7 Seconds, Bad Brains, and Metallica, as well as the "wave of [Amphetamine Reptile] bands, Helmet, Jesus Lizard, Unsane and Tar." The band's first full-length album, Curves That Kick, was released in 1993 on Bacteria Sour, an independent label owned by renowned artist, Pushead. Tony Baumeister joined the band as the permanent bass player in 1993, shortly before CTK was released. Following the album's release, the summer of 1994 saw 16 tour Japan, and then return home to play 2 shows with Slayer.

=== Drop Out and Blaze of Incompetence (1995–1998) ===
The band's next record, Drop Out, was released by Pessimiser/Theologian records in 1996 (after being shelved for nearly two years). In spite of Drop Out's critical acclaim, 16 did not tour heavily, opting instead to focus on performing locally. Jason Corley was out of the band at the end of 1994. He was replaced with Andy Hassler. Phil Vera was also added as a second guitarist. The band released Blaze of Incompetence in 1997 (again on Pessimiser/Theologian), and did a US tour with Grief in 1998. Andy Hassler was fired shortly after the tour. R.D. Davies replaced Andy, and then he was replaced by Mark Sanger 6 months later.

=== Zoloft Smile and hiatus (1999–2004) ===
16's next album, Zoloft Smile, was recorded in 1999/2000, but was not released until 2002 by At A Loss Recordings. By the time the album was released, Bobby and Tony had both quit the band. The rest of the guys limped along with Phil being the lone guitar player. Nial McGaughey and later, Rafa Martinez handled bass duties. Phil took over vocal duties in 2003, after Cris was forced to go to rehab for alcohol and drug dependency. Addiction issues have plagued the band throughout their career, with Jerue remarking in a 2012 interview with Invisible Oranges, "there have been 14 dudes in this band and not one has been stable mentally or chemically." The band then toured the US and Japan as a three-piece (Phil, Mark, Rafa), until finally calling it quits in 2004.

=== Reformation, Bridges to Burn, and Deep Cuts from Dark Clouds (2007–2014) ===
Ferry, Jerue, Corley and Baumeister reformed 16 in 2007, subsequently securing a deal with Relapse Records. Their Relapse debut, Bridges to Burn, was released in January 2009. The band parted ways with Corley again, and recruited Mateo Pinkerton as their new drummer. In 2010, Relapse Records released The First Trimester, a compilation of non-album material (primarily recorded in 1992-93). Deep Cuts from Dark Clouds followed in 2012. In 2012, Last Hurrah Records also released Lost Tracts of Time, a compilation featuring b-sides from the Zoloft Smile era. In 2010 the band toured Europe playing the Hellfest festival in Nantes France. In 2014 the band once again toured Europe making a stop at the Roadburn festival in Tilburg Netherlands.

=== The Lifespan of a Moth, Dream Squasher, Into Dust, Guides for the Misguided (2015–present) ===
On May 18, 2016, Stereogum premiered a new track from Lifespan of a Moth, "The Absolute Center of a Pitch Black Heart".

On June 9, 2016, Decibel premiered 16's video for "Peaches, Cream and The Placenta". Guitarist Bobby Ferry said of the track, "The song is a stressed-out walk down a well-trodden trail that we have been prancing down since the early '90s. The lyrics delicately touch with all thumbs on the subject of addictive personality sorcery that creates unintended helpless victims." The video was directed by longtime 16 collaborator and producer, Jeff Forrest.

In June 2016, it was announced that "Landloper" was the opening track from Lifespan of a Moth. Shortly after, Alex Shuster joined the band as 2nd guitar player.

On August 15, 2016, guitarist Bobby Ferry discussed Lifespan of a Moth on the Everything Went Black podcast, hosted by Tombs frontman Mike Hill.

In 2017 and 2018 the band embarked on number of extensive European tours with Grime and Primitive Man, playing Desertfest and Bloodshed Fest accordingly.

In 2020, the album, entitled Dream Squasher was announced for release on June 5. Bobby Ferry undertook the vocal duties, as Cris Jerue retired from music business.

In 2022, the band continued their creative momentum by releasing the album Into Dust via Relapse Records. It received positive reviews from Spin, Metal Hammer, New Noise, and Decibel Magazine.

In early 2025, Relapse Records announced that "Guides for the Misguided" will be the title of 10th album. Out on Feb 7 2025 and followed by a European tour to support the release.

== Personnel ==
=== Current members ===
- Bobby Ferry – guitar, vocals (1991–2000, 2007–present)
- Barney Firks – bass (2013–present)
- Dion Thurman – drums (2013–present)
- Alex Shuster – guitar (2016–present)

=== Former members ===
- Jason Corley – drums (1991–1995, 2007–2009)
- Cris Jerue – vocals (1991–2002, 2007–2020)
- Benji Clark – bass (1991–1992)
- Greg Burkhart – bass (1992)
- Mike Morris – bass (1992–1993)
- Tony Baumeister – bass (1993–2002, 2007–2013)
- Andy Hassler – drums (1995–1998)
- Phil Vera – guitar, vocals (1995–2004)
- R.D. Davies – drums (1998–1999)
- Mark Sanger – drums (1999–2004)
- Nial Mcgaughey – bass (2002–2003)
- Rafael Martinez – bass (2003–2004)
- Mateo Pinkerton – drums (2009–2013)

== Discography ==
=== Studio albums ===
- Curves That Kick (Bacteria Sour, 1993)
- Drop Out (Theologian Records, 1996)
- Blaze of Incompetence (Pessimiser, 1997)
- Zoloft Smile (At a Loss Records, 2003)
- Bridges to Burn (Relapse, 2009)
- Deep Cuts from Dark Clouds (Relapse, 2012)
- Lifespan of a Moth (Relapse, 2016)
- Dream Squasher (Relapse, 2020)
- Into Dust (Relapse, 2022)
- Guides for the Misguided (Relapse, 2025)

=== Singles and extended plays ===
- Doorprize (Reverb Recordings, 1992)
- Japanese Tour (Pushead Fanclub, 1993)
- Wash Me (Pushead Fanclub, 1993)
- Sail Rabbit (Standard, 1993)
- Crystal (Pushead Fanclub, 1993)
- Split with The American Psycho Band (No Lie, 1994)
- Apollo Creed split with Fresh American Lamb (Theologian Records, 1994)
- Trigger Happy / Pessimiser split with Grief (Pessimiser, 1994)
- Preoccupied (Bacteria Sour, 1994)
- Felicia (Bacteria Sour, 1994)
- Tocohara (Bacteria Sour, 1995)
- The Good, the Bad and the Ugly: The Bad (Disc 2) split with Toadliquor, Floor, Cavity, Thug (Insolito, 1998)
- Bored / At Dawn They Sleep split with Grief (Pessimiser, 1998)
- Fortune & Flames (MP3.com, 2000)
- Zodiac Dreaming split with Today Is the Day (Trash Art!, 2001)
- Lost Tracts of Time (Last Hurrah Records, 2012)
- 16 / Fistula (Patac Records, 2017)
- Doom Sessions Vol.3 (Heavy Psych Sounds, 2021)
- Cadaver Monuments 4 way split with Deadbird, Fistula and Nightstick (Totem Cat Records, 2023)

=== Compilations ===
- Scott Case: Out of Print Material (Pessimiser/Theologian, 1998)
- Never Give In: A Tribute To Bad Brains (Century Media Records, 1999)
- The First Trimester (Relapse Records, 2010)
- Alice in Chains Dirt (Redux) (Magnetic Eye Records, 2020)
- Forgeries Vol 1, 1972-1984 (Heavy Psych Sounds Records, 2026)

=== Videos ===
- Damone (independent, 2000)
- Sadlands (Relapse, 2020) Directed by Michael Panduro
- Scrape the Rocks (Relapse, 2022) Directed by Chad Kelco
- Proudly Damned (Relapse, 2025) Directed by Carlos Wright
