= Halo (metal band) =

Drone metal duo

Halo was a drone/sludge metal duo formed in Melbourne, Australia in 1994, but mainly active in London, England. They were signed to Relapse Records for three of their albums. They toured Europe with Pig Destroyer in 2006.

== Discography ==
- Halo (aka Subliminal Transmissions) (1998) (CDr, Album) Embryo Recordings EMB002 Australia
- Massive Corporate Disease (1999) (CDr, Album + File, MP3) Embryo Recordings EMB003 Australia
- Degree Zero Point of Implosion (2000) (CDr) Embryo Recordings EMB010 Australia
- Guattari (From The West Flows Grey Ash And Pestilence) (2001) (CD, Album) Relapse Records RR 6492-2 USA
- Agoraphobic Nosebleed / Halo - Untitled / Raping The Raper (2002) (7", Ltd) Relapse Records RR-048 USA
- Body of Light (2003) (CD) Relapse Records RR 6573-2 USA
- Live 06:06:01 (2004) (File, MP3) Embryo Recordings EMB018 Australia
- Degree Zero Point of Implosion (2010) (LP, Ltd, Reissue) With Intent Records WIRZERO USA
- Gods of Sound (2014)

== Style ==
The band is mostly noise based. William York of AllMusic regards them as following in Goldflesh's footsteps with albums such as Body of Light.

Their album Guattari (From The West Flows Grey Ash And Pestilence) features themes of necrophilia.

== Current members ==
- Skye Klein - bass, vocals
- Robert Allen - drums

== Former members ==
- David Ryan - guitar
