= Derek Hess =

Derek Hess is an American artist based in Cleveland, Ohio. His creative career grew largely out of his ability to express the emotion in the indie, hardcore, and metal scenes of the mid-1990s. From concert posters to politically charged fine art pieces, Cleveland-based artist Derek Hess has tested the waters of both the music and art world for over 15 years. Hess began creating promotional flyers for shows in Cleveland using his own unique vision and a tendency to playing off the band's names and genres. These flyers soon garnered the attention of countless bands as well as both the Rock and Roll Hall of Fame and the Louvre in Paris, who both have Hess' art in their permanent collections.

In addition to posters for bands such as Deftones, Thursday, Clutch, and Pearl Jam, Hess has created CD covers for bands like Sepultura, Season to Risk, Motion City Soundtrack, Converge, and Unearth. He has also been featured on television shows and in magazines including TLC, Food Network, MTV, Fuse, VH1, Alternative Press as well as many others.

== Early life and education ==
Derek Hess was influenced by his father, a World War II veteran and Industrial Design professor at the Cleveland Institute of Art. Hess stated on his website that he remembers asking his father to draw the war scenes that he experienced. From a young age, Hess was transfixed by his father Roy's ability to create images of planes and tanks he saw in his mind's eye on the paper.

Alongside his father's artistic ability, Hess also inherited his desire to make a living from art. Beginning his career as a student at the ClA, Hess later transferred to College for Creative Studies in Detroit to focus on graphic design and illustration before settling in on a major in fine art and printmaking. He finished his degree at CIA in their critically acclaimed printmaking program.

== Techniques ==
Hess says one of his biggest artistic influences is Gil Kane's "forced perspective" technique that his father introduced him to. Forced perspective is an art technique that creates an optical illusion making an object appear farther away, closer, larger or smaller than it actually is by making it larger than the rest of the image. This artistic technique was so influential to his style, it became the title of his documentary, Forced Perspective which was released in 2016.

Another of Gil Kane's techniques called "window boxing" has also been very influential in Hess' art. Window boxing is a technique where a figure appears to break out of the frame to make it appear larger than life. This technique can be seen in many of Hess' early Euclid Tavern concert posters.

Hess' technical understanding of human anatomy and fine art education set him apart from other artists of his time. Hess had several instructors, including his father, who were veterans of WWII. These early drawing instructors instilled a tough work ethic in Hess. Learning anatomy as a fundamental of art began falling out of fashion with the invention of the camera. When artists no longer had to draw recreations of realistic life, they were free to explore different types of drawing and expression.

Hess had an intuitive ability to draw and understand the human body but says that he needed instruction and direction: "I intuitively knew how to look and I understood to draw, it came naturally, but that was a problem in my early days. I 'knew better' than everyone else—and I was an out of control drunk maniac kid. I was a lot of trouble—but I would go to class and I'd look at other kids' drawings and think 'Yeah, I got you all beat, I'll see you in five weeks!'", he said in his documentary.

Although the ability to draw has always come easy for him, the process takes practice, "For years and years, I would just flip pages in sketchbooks and draw, draw, draw until something came out. That's a good way to approach it, I think." Talking about his artistic process, he explained that it doesn't always come out the way he wants or expects it to the first time, "Once I let go of the struggle and start sketching, it starts to come out. It'll never be completely pure, there are always filters that go through you. If you're tuned in, you can feel if it's flowing. There's something that we all tune in to, and we can be connected to it. It's a choice."

== Career ==
=== The Euclid Tavern and beginnings as a poster artist ===
After returning to Cleveland, Hess got a job at a bar he frequented while living in Cleveland, the Euclid Tavern. Described by Hess as a "workingman's shot-and-a-beer-bar", the Euclid Tavern was known as being a hub for local and underground music. Here, Hess chopped chicken wings and took charge of booking bands. He soon began to curtail the kinds of the bands being brought to the tavern into something he liked and was comfortable with. He also started creating the promotional flyers and posters for the shows using his own unique vision and a play off the bands' names and genres. These flyers were the very beginning of Derek's career as an artist.

The first time Hess' work was recognized in collaboration with a musician was with the alternative metal band Helmet. The flyers and posters Hess created were the first in a series that were posted all over the area. The posters interested local art dealer William Busta, who then showed the flyers in his gallery. When Hess began using color graphics in his posters he received much more recognition and was featured in Newsweek magazine, in an article on new poster artists of 1994.

=== Fine art ===
Because of Hess' success as a poster artist, he had a built-in fan base when he wanted to make the jump back into fine art. Hess has been able to cultivate a large and expansive fan-base because of his wide appeal across genres. There are people who love his art because of its ties to music. Meanwhile, there are people who have never heard of the bands he has done work for that appreciate his fine art.

Hess' aptitude to convey his work through this showcase of fundamentals has helped elevate him from a poster artist to a skilled fine-artist utilizing pen and ink, acrylic paint, and silkscreen prints with handmade separations.

"I actually do very little poster art anymore, if any," Hess said. "I've been able to develop and mature as an artist and I'm lucky that people have been very accepting of the progression."

Hess' art has been able to transcend genres as well as generations, which is icing on the cake for the artist. "At the end of the day I'd like, ideally, for all of my art to be technically sound and that hopefully connects with people. That, to me, is what makes successful art."

=== Strhess music festivals and clothing line ===
Hess' music festivals, Strhess Fests and Strhess Tours, both in the United States and abroad made a huge impact in the hardcore and metal scenes in the early 2000s. These shows were a collaboration of music and art that featured bands such as Thursday, Shadow's Fall, Stretch Arm Strong, and Taking Back Sunday.

The first Strhess Fest was in 2003 in Austin, Texas during South by Southwest to a capacity crowd featuring Candiria, Every Time I Die, Nora, and Atreyu. The following festivals were renamed Strhess Tour, which ran from 2003 to 2007. The first was held in held in Cleveland, Ohio at the Scene Pavilion in the West bank of the Flats. Following the success of these shows, Strhess Tour traveled the U.S. and did a brief tour through Europe. The festivals featured both local and national bands, all of which were hand-picked by Hess himself, mostly hardcore and metal bands.

Hess now owns his own Indiemerch clothing line, Strhess. His shirt designs can be seen worn by many famous musicians from the genres rock to indie. Shaun Morgan of Seether Was photographed wearing a Strhess shirt in the liner notes of One Cold Night, a live acoustic album. The Strhess Brand came about as Hess began making his move from poster art to fine art. The name came from the Strhess Tours and Festivals that fans were already familiar with. Because of this, Hess was able to bridge the gap between his music roots and newer ventures into fine arts.

=== Present day ===
Today, Derek is still creating art and frequently has art shows at his gallery in Cleveland, Ohio, The Derek Hess Gallery, located at 78th Street Studios in the Gordon Square Arts District. Hess is currently doing talks and screenings across the country to promote his new documentary, Forced Perspective.

== Personal life ==
Throughout his entire career, Hess struggled with alcoholism. He later realized his alcohol abuse was a way for him to self-medicate and cope with bipolar disorder.

He first went to rehab at 18. "The law said go to County Jail or go to rehab, so I said 'Let's go to rehab!'", Hess recalled. It was here that Hess learned about his mental illness and how it had been affecting his life without his knowing. After rehab, Hess was sober for 16 years, later falling off the wagon after a bad break-up.

His battle with alcoholism began to affect his art, "The work I was making when I was drunk or hungover wasn't as good as it could be. I would think I was doing a masterpiece, until I looked at it the next day," Hess said.

Hess eventually checked himself into rehab again. "I got there, it was noon, and they asked me if I'd been drinking. 'HELL YEAH, I've been drinking!' Because I'd get sick if I didn't drink," Hess said. Since then, Hess has remained sober and has found more effective ways to manage his bipolar disorder.

In his documentary, Forced Perspective, Hess spoke candidly about his battle with alcoholism and mental illness and has worked with several mental health organizations while promoting the film.

== See also ==
- Lowbrow (art movement)
