= Iodine Recordings discography =

The following is a list of releases by independent record label Iodine Recordings The label was founded by Casey Horrigan in 1996 and began releasing albums in 1998.

== Main discography ==
Catalog^{[note A]}	Artist(s)	Album	Type	Format(s)	Year	Notes
IOD-01	Various Artists	Ghost In The Gears	Compilation	CD	1998	Feat. Converge, Cave In, Jeromes Dream, and more.
IOD-02	Orange Island	The Shape Of Calling	EP	CD, CS	2001, 2021	Cassette reissued in 2021.
IOD-03	Blue/Green Heart	Self Esteem Through Modern Science	EP	7" vinyl	2001	
IOD-03.14	Good Band Name	Let's Get Dreamfasted	EP	CD	2002	
IOD-04	Orange Island	Everything You Thought You Knew	LP	CD	2002	
IOD-05	Brand New	Your Favorite Weapon	LP	Vinyl	2002	Included track “My Nine Rides Shotgun”, which wasn't included on future versions of the album.
IOD-06	Gregor Samsa	Gregor Samsa	EP	CD	2002	
IOD-07	The Nationale Blue	A Different Kind of Listening	LP	CD	2002	
IOD-08	There Were Wires	There Were Wires	LP	CD, Vinyl	2002, 2023	Remixed/Remastered Deluxe Edition re-issued in 2023.
IOD-08B	There Were Wires	Live Wires	LP	10” Vinyl, Digital	2023	Remastered live recording from WERS 88.9.
IOD-09	The Moomaw Collective	Kiss Me Red	LP	CD	2003	Split release with Simba Records (EU)
IOD-10	Gregor Samsa	27:36	EP	CD	2003	
IOD-11	Garrison	The Model	EP	CD	2003	
IOD-12	Jericho RVA	Worker's Union	EP	CD	2003	Reissued in 2022 as Smoke or Fire "Beauty Fades".
IOD-13	There Were Wires	Nothing...Lipstick, A Little Blood	EP	7" vinyl	2003	B-side "Tunic" by Sonic Youth
IOD-14	Aim of Conrad	Whiskey Slowboat	LP	CD	2003	
IOD-15	There Were Wires	Somnambulists	LP	CD	2003	
IOD-16	There Were Wires	Somnambulists	LP	Vinyl, CS	2021	Remastered, includes bonus track.
IOD-17	Jeromes Dream	Presents	LP	Vinyl, CS	2021	Remastered
IOD-18	Garrison	The Bend Before The Break	LP	Vinyl, CS	2021	Remastered, includes rarities and b-sides.
IOD-19	Smoke or Fire	Beauty Fades	LP	Vinyl	2022	Remastered, includes rarities and b-sides.
IOD-20	Ritual Earth	MMXX	LP	Vinyl, CD	2022	
IOD-21	Audio Karate	¡OTRA!	LP	Vinyl, CS	2022	Includes rarities and b-sides.
IOD-22	Ritual Earth	Distress Signal	Single	Flexi	2022	
IOD-23	Onelinedrawing	Tenderwild	LP	Vinyl, CS	2022	
IOD-24	Orange Island	One Night Stay	LP	Vinyl	2022	
IOD-25	As The Sun Sets	Untitled Discography	LP	Vinyl	2021, 2025	Complete Discography (remastered)
IOD-26	Bucket Full of Teeth	I / II / III / IV	LP	Vinyl	2023	Complete Discography 2xLP (remastered)
IOD-27	Gregor Samsa	40:13.5	LP	Vinyl	2024	Collection of first 2 EPs, remastered.
IOD-28	Attempt Survivors	Educated Hips	EP	7" vinyl	2022	
IOD-29	Her Head's On Fire	College Rock and Clove Cigarettes	LP	Vinyl, CS	2022	
IOD-30	Quicksand	Slip	LP	Vinyl, Book	2023	30th Anniversary Reissue (remastered)
IOD-31	Onelinedrawing	Departure	EP	7" vinyl	2022	
IOD-32	Nathan Gray & The Iron Roses	Rebel Songs	LP	Vinyl, CD, CS	2022	Split release with End Hits Records (EU)
IOD-33	The Darling Fire	Distortions	LP	Vinyl, CD, CS	2022	
IOD-34	Garrison	A Mile in Cold Water	LP	Vinyl	2023	Remastered reissue
IOD-35	Best Ex	With a Smile	LP	Vinyl	2023	
IOD-36	Hey Thanks!	Start/Living	LP	Vinyl, CD, CS	2022	
IOD-37	Light Tower	Light Tower	EP	CS	2022	
IOD-38	Stretch Arm Strong	Rituals of Life	LP	Vinyl	2022	Remastered reissue
IOD-39	Drowningman	Busy Signal at the Suicide Hotline	LP	Vinyl, Digital	2022	Remastered reissue, including bonus tracks.
IOD-39B	Drowningman	Later Day Saints	EP	Vinyl, Digital	2022	
IOD-40	Six Going On Seven	Self-Made Mess	LP	Vinyl	2023	Remastered reissue
IOD-41	Six Going On Seven	Method Actor	EP	Digital	2023	Remastered reissue
IOD-42	Jeromes Dream	The Gray In Between	LP	Vinyl, CS	2023	
IOD-43	Stretch Arm Strong	A Revolution Transmission	LP	Vinyl	2023	Remastered reissue
IOD-44	Audio Karate	A Show of Hands	EP	7" vinyl	2023	
IOD-45	The Iron Roses	The Iron Roses	LP	Vinyl, CD	2023	
IOD-46	Horsewhip	Consume and Burn	LP	Vinyl, CS	2023	
IOD-47	Horsewhip	Buried	Single	Flexi	2023	
IOD-48	Stretch Arm Strong	Rock and Roll All Nite	Single	Flexi	2023	Remastered reissue
IOD-49	Rebuilder	Local Support	LP	Vinyl, CD	2023	
IOD-50	Hassan I Sabbah	Untitled	LP	Vinyl	2024	Complete Discography (remastered)
IOD-51	NØ MAN	Poison Darts	Single	Flexi	2023	
IOD-52	Garrison & Orange Island	Songs from a Central Massachusetts Mill Town	EP	7” vinyl	2023	Split release, hand numbered out of 250
IOD-53	Various Artists	Fest 21 Comp	Compilation	Vinyl, CD	2023	Benefit for Feed The Scene, featuring bands from The Fest (FL)
IOD-54	Dead Bars	Regulars	LP	Vinyl	2023	
IOD-55	Unsufferable	Unsufferable	EP	7” Vinyl	2024	
IOD-56	Downtalker	All My Friends are Dead	Single	Digital	2023	
IOD-57	Onelinedrawing	Sketchbook	2xLP	Vinyl, Digital	2022	Remastered collection, 1999–2001.
IOD-58	Love Letter	New Anthemic	Single	Flexi	2024	
IOD-59	NØ MAN	Glitter and Spit	LP	Vinyl, CD	2024	
IOD-60	Stretch Arm Strong	The Revealing	EP	Vinyl, CD	2024	
IOD-61	Dead Bars	Jukebox Vol. 1	Single	Digital	2023	
IOD-62	Her Head's On Fire	Strange Desires	LP	Vinyl	2024	
IOD-62B	Her Head's On Fire	Addicts and Habits	Single	Flexi	2024	
IOD-63	Love Letter	Everyone Wants Something Beautiful	LP	Vinyl, CS	2024	
IOD-64	Love Letter	Death of a Nation	EP	Vinyl, Digital	2018	
IOD-65	DROUGHT	EP	EP	7” Vinyl	2024	
IOD-66	Fastbreak	Fast Cars, Fast Women	LP	Vinyl	2025	Remastered reissue, includes bonus tracks.
IOD-67	Piebald	We Are the Only Friends We Have	LP	Vinyl	2024	Remastered reissue, including deluxe 2xLP.
IOD-68	Further Seems Forever	Hide Nothing	LP	Vinyl	2024	20th Anniversary remastered reissue.
IOD-70	Six Going On Seven	Heartbreak's Got Backbeat	LP	Vinyl	2024	Remastered reissue
IOD-71	TEARDROPS	Something To Cry About	EP	Digital, Flexi	2024	Flexi single for “Crooked Heart”
IOD-72	Audio Karate	Lady Melody	LP	Vinyl	2024	20th Anniversary remastered reissue.
IOD-73	Candy Hearts	You Could Be Anyone	LP	Digital, CS	2024	Collection of B-Sides from 2010 to 2016.
IOD-74	Shai Hulud	Just Can't Hate Enough	EP	Vinyl	2024	Reissued release from 2015.
IOD-75	Dead Bars	All Dead Bars Go To Heaven	LP	Vinyl	2025	
IOD-76	Onelinedrawing	Scan Anxiety	EP	7” Vinyl	2024	
IOD-77	Various Artists	Fest 22 Comp	Compilation	Vinyl	2024	Benefit for Feed The Scene, featuring bands from The Fest (FL)
IOD-78	Memory Entry	Our World is Going to Disappear	EP	Vinyl	2025	Split release with Mind Over Matter Records.
IOD-79	Hey Thanks	Forward	Single	Digital	2024	
IOD-80	Hundreds of AU	Life in Parallel	LP	Vinyl	2025	
IOD-82	Piebald	If It Weren't for Venetian Blinds, It Would Be Curtains for Us All	LP	Vinyl	2026	Remastered reissue, including deluxe 2xLP.
IOD-85	Various Artists	The Dogs of Hope	Compilation	LP	2025	Feat. Killswitch Engage, Snapcase, Deadguy, and more.
IOD-86	Bloodhorse	A Malign Star	LP	Vinyl	2025	
IOD-87	Piebald	Tales for the Rages	LP	Vinyl, CD	2026	
IOD-88	DROUGHT	Souvenir	LP	Vinyl, CD	2025	
IOD-89	Onelinedrawing	Rainbowmachine	LP	Vinyl, CD	2026	
IOD-90	Quicksand	Manic Compression	LP	Vinyl, Book	2025	30th Anniversary Reissue (remastered)
IOD-91	The Casket Lottery	Feel the Teeth	LP	Vinyl	2025	
IOD-92	Stretch Arm Strong	Free at Last	LP	Vinyl	2025	Remastered reissue, 20th anniversary edition.
IOD-93	Modern Life is War	Life on the Moon	LP	Vinyl, CD	2025	Split release with Deathwish Inc.
IOD-94	Quiet Fear	La Tierra Arriba / El Abismo Abajo	LP	Vinyl, CS	2026	
IOD-95	The Saddest Landscape	Alone with Heaven	2xLP	Vinyl, CD	2026	Feat. Julien Baker, Jeremy Bolm, and Evan Weiss.
IOD-95B	The Saddest Landscape	Hexes	Single	Flexi	2025	
IOD-96	New Forms	Nothing's Sacred Anymore	EP	Vinyl	2026	
IOD-97	Her Head's On Fire	Am I Not Your Girl?	LP	Vinyl	2026	
IOD-98	There Were Wires	Vessel	LP	Vinyl	2026	
IOD-99	hey thanks.	Avoidance	LP	Vinyl, CD	2026	
IOD-101	NØ MAN	Between the Sword and the Neck	LP	Vinyl, CD, CS	2026	
IOD-101B	NØ MAN	Moan	Single	Flexi	2026	
IOD-102	Gameface	All My Friends	EP	7" vinyl	2026	
IOD-104	Best Ex	Good Girl	LP	Vinyl	2026	
IOD-105	Dosser	Born for Nothing/Born by Mistake	LP	Vinyl	2026	

== Sub-discographies ==
=== Iodine Publishing catalog ===
Catalog	Author(s)	Title	Type	Format(s)	Year	Notes
IOD-P01	Thomas Rackow	Free Stickers With Every Order	Book	Hardcover	2026	A History of Hardcore Stickers
IOD-P02	Ray Harkins	100 Words or Less	Book	Paperback	2026	Interviews from Independent Culture, Book 1

=== Samsara Records catalog ===
Catalog	Artist(s)	Album	Type	Format(s)	Year	Notes
SRI-01	In Pieces	Learning to Accept Silence	LP	Digital	2025	Digital reissue of the 2002 release.
SRI-02	Eulcid	The Crane EP	EP	Digital	2025	Digital reissue of the 1999 release.
SRI-03	The Nationale Blue	The Nationale Blue	EP	Digital	2026	Digital reissue of the 2004 release.
SRI-04	The Chase Scene	The Great Divide	EP	Digital	2026	Digital reissue of the 2002 release.
SRI-07	Barbaro	Barbaro	EP	Digital	2025	Digital reissue of the 1999 release.
SRI-11	I Hate Our Freedom	This Year's Best Disaster	LP	Digital	2026	Digital reissue of the 2012 release.

=== Sampler catalog ===
Catalog	Artist(s)	Album	Format(s)	Year	Notes
IOD-S01	Various Artists	A Mix CD with Love	CD	2002	Multi-label sampler with Equal Vision Records, Revelation Records, and more.
IOD-S02	Various Artists	Iodine Label Sampler	CD	2002	Made for MacRock 2002.
IOD-S03	Various Artists	Gravity Rides Everything	CD	2003	Multi-label sampler with Equal Vision Records, Revelation Records, and more.
IOD-S04	Various Artists	Underground Music Vol. 1	CD	2026	Free label sampler featuring 14 new tracks from 2025 & 2026.
