= God Fires Man =

American rock band

- Also known as: Fires
- Origin: Brooklyn, New York, U.S.
- Genres: Alternative rock, punk rock, hard rock, indie rock, shoegaze
- Years active: 2006-2010
- Labels: Arctic Rodeo Recordings; XTRA Mile; InDeGoot Recordings
- Past members: Arty Shepherd; Joseph Grillo; John Wilkinson; Drew Thomas
- Website: https://www.facebook.com/godfiresman/

God Fires Man was an American rock band that formed in the summer 2006 in Brooklyn, New York, United States. The band consisted of Arthur Shepherd (vocals/guitar), Joseph Grillo (vocals/guitar), John Wilkinson (bass), and Drew Thomas (drums).

== Former and current bands ==
The members of God Fires Man had been involved in several bands before God Fires Man's creation. Arthur Shepherd ("Arty") had been part of Mind Over Matter, Errortype: Eleven, Instruction, and Gay For Johnny Depp (using the name Marty Leopard), and he is currently a member of Primitive Weapons. Joseph Grillo had been a member of Garrison, Instruction, and Gay For Johnny Depp (using the name Sid Jagger), and he is currently a member of I Hate Our Freedom. John Wilkinson previously played guitar and keys in The Symphony Case, and was also a member of Slept. Drew Thomas had played drums for Youth of Today, Bold, Into Another, Walking Concert, New Rising Sons, and Bloody Social, and he is currently in Dead Heavens.

== Formation, sound, and debut album ==
God Fires Man was formed in 2006 following the dissolution of Instruction, in which both Arty and Joseph were members, and after the duos creation of the band Gay For Johnny Depp. God Fires Man, whose name started out as “Fires”, finalized their lineup, and name, with the addition of John Wilkinson and Drew Thomas. The band's early sound was largely influenced by a mix of shoegaze and punk rock, which is more obvious in their b-sides. However, as the band began collaboratively writing, they quickly found their sound being more hard rock, with the subtle influence of these styles still being heard in many of their songs.

On September 5, 2006, God Fires Man played their first hometown show at CBGB, their first official show being at an art space (the Lilypad) in Cambridge, MA. Working hard through the end of 2006, the band released a 5-track EP, followed by a tour in the United Kingdom in January 2007 with Hundred Reasons and Kids in Glass Houses.

When God Fires Man returned stateside, they signed a record deal with InDeGoot Recordings (US), and XTRA Mile (UK). In 2007, the band recorded their debut album, “A Billion Balconies Facing the Sun,” working with Ethan Dussault (who had engineered records for Cave In, Toadies, and Lot 6) and Brian Virtue (who had engineered and mixed records for Audioslave, Deftones, and Jane's Addiction). Following the album's release in March 2008, God Fires Man went on a US tour with Filter, while also sharing the stage with Taking Back Sunday, Thursday, Frank Turner, 65daysofstatic, Chevelle, and Scott Weiland. For the release of "A Billion Balconies Facing the Sun," God Fires Man was named one of iTunes “Top 10 New Rock Artists” in 2008.

== Life Like ==
In January 2009, God Fires Man finished their second album titled Life Like for a June 26, 2009 release. Life Like was produced by Alex Newport (who had engineered and mixed records for At The Drive In, Mars Volta, Death Cab for Cutie, and The Melvins), and released on Arctic Rodeo Recordings (EU/JP). Swimming against the current of music conformity, Life Like was originally released on vinyl LP format. On September 22, 2009, Life Like became available for purchase on iTunes. In October and November 2009, God Fires Man toured in Germany with the Picture Books, which was the band's first time as a headliner. The tour kicked of in Dortmund, where God Fires Man played at the 20th anniversary show for the music magazine Visions. Playing the support slot for the Donots and Fire in the Attic, portions of this performance were televised on the German music show Rockpalast. At the end of the year, iTunes named Life Like as one of the best rock albums of the year in their “iTunes Rewind 2009”.

Upon returning from Germany, God Fires Man went on permanent hiatus. In March 2010, the band play two shows supporting their good friends Rival Schools.

== Past Shrugs (2005-2009) ==
Past Shrugs is a compilation album featuring God Fires Man songs from 2005 to 2009 that were not released on either of the band's two full-length studio albums. Past Shrugs features songs from the band's 2007 Dark EP, bonus tracks found on versions of Life Like, along with four songs never released, including "There's Nothing Left to Underachieve," which was recorded with Brian Virtue in Nashville, TN on a day off while on tour with Filter. The album was released to iTunes in May 2010.

== Track listing ==
=== A Billion Balconies Facing the Sun ===
1. "Braille Graffiti"
2. "Be Here Forever"
3. "The Killer"
4. "Happy, Unhappy, Afraid"
5. "Heartbreak"
6. "Melt Away"
7. "Dark"
8. "Simple Things"
9. "The Shrug"
10. "Sermons"

=== Life Like ===
1. "Kill the Pundits"
2. "Archetype"
3. "Always Late"
4. "Procreating Atheists"
5. "Billion Balconies"
6. "The Future is Old Obey the Past"
7. "Training Bullets"
8. "I'm Worth More Dead than Alive"
9. "Let 'Em Burn"

=== Life Like bonus tracks ===
1. "Sorted Backwards"
2. "Transgression"
3. "The Great Wake Up Call"

=== Past Shrugs (2005-2009) ===
1. "There's Nothing Left to Underachieve"
2. "Bombs"
3. "Sorted Backwards"
4. "Redefine"
5. "The Day I Knew Everything"
6. "Transgression"
7. "Miracle"
8. "Unfold"
9. "The Great Wake Up Call"
10. "Still?"
