= Worker's Union =

EP by Smoke or Fire
- Released: 2002 and 2003
- Genre: Punk rock, pop punk, melodic hardcore
- Label: Iodine Recordings

Smoke or Fire chronology
| When The Battery Dies (2001) | Worker's Union (2002) | Above the City (2005) |

Professional ratings
Review scores
| Source | Rating |
|---|---|
| Punknews.org | 4/5 stars |

Worker's Union is the first EP from Richmond, Virginia-based punk band Smoke or Fire. This was originally recorded under the name Jericho RVA and the band was forced to change their name shortly after the record's release due to a band already existing under the same name. This record was released on the Boston-based record label Iodine Recordings and received great reviews from the punk rock community. Iodine Recordings went out of business shortly after Worker's Union was released, which limited its distribution. Smoke or Fire signed to Fat Wreck Chords soon after and released their follow-up album Above the City.

== 2002 Track listing (originally released on All About Records under the name Jericho) ==
1. "Sunday Pints"
2. "Beauty Fades"
3. "Fifty Cent Hearts"
4. "Second Wind"
5. "Running In Circles"
6. "They All Go To California"

== 2003 Track listing (re-released artwork shown on right) ==
1. "Sunday Pints"
2. "Beauty Fades"
3. "Fifty Cent Hearts"
4. "Second Wind"
5. "Running In Circles"
6. "They All Go To California"
7. "Oxygen"
