= Speakeasy (disambiguation) =

A speakeasy is a saloon, common during Prohibition (1920–1933) in the United States.

Speakeasy may also refer to:

== Computers and electronics ==
- SpeakEasy, a software defined radio project of the United States military
- Speakeasy (computational environment), a numeric computational environment and programming language
- Speakeasy (ISP), a large internet service provider in the USA

== Film and TV ==
- Speakeasy (1929 film)
- Speakeasy (2002 film), by Brendan Murphy
- Speakeasy (Ireland), a daytime show broadcast in Ireland

== Music ==
- The Speakeasy Club, a London club where musicians met and played during the late 1960s and early 1970s
- Speakeasy (D.I.G. album), 1995
- Speakeasy (Freeze the Atlantic album), 2012
- Speakeasy (Stavesacre album), 1999
- The Speakeasy (album), a 2010 album by Smoke or Fire
- "Speakeasy", a 1994 single by Shed Seven from the album Change Giver

== Other uses ==
- Speakeasy Comics, a Canadian comic book company
- Speakeasy (Hong Kong), a type of eatery in modern Hong Kong that does not operate under a restaurant licence, but de facto functioning as a restaurant
- Speakeasy Ales and Lagers, a Microbrewery in San Francisco, California
- Speakeasy Theaters, a theater that sells beer and wine in Oakland, California
