= Sidehatch Entertainment Group =

United States music company

- Company type: Corporation
- Industry: Entertainment industry
- Headquarters: Boston, Massachusetts
- Key people: Ben Maitland-Lewis (Founder, Executive Director), Chris Cave (Partner, Managing Director), Christopher Thomas (Producer)
- Website: www.sidehatchentertainment.com

Sidehatch Entertainment Group (SEG) is a Boston-based music company with brands in concert and festival promotion, marketing, industry consulting, tour bus rentals, software development and client-based services, including presentation, performance, and organization.

== History ==
SEG was founded in 2004 by Ben Maitland-Lewis, whilst attending Berklee College of Music.

Past SEG clients include Wilco, Newport Folk Festival, Daniel Lanois, Piebald, the PTown Festival, Boston Urban Music Project and Bowery Presents.

== Current products ==
=== Sidecast ===
Internet radio podcast available on iTunes featuring music from SEG artists, interviews with major label artists and professionals such as Fat Mike (NOFX), Bryn Bennett, (Bang Camaro), and Enter Shikari.

=== Grease Bus ===
The SEG crew overhauled a 19-passenger shuttle bus, creating an eco-friendly grease burning tour bus, enabling bands to get on the road whilst avoiding the expense of gas prices.

=== Sound and video production ===
The SEG office, located in Charlestown, Boston, shares space with a live venue and recording studio frequented by local Boston as well as touring acts.

=== Indie Ambassador ===
Founded in 2009 by Ben Maitland-Lewis and Chris Cave of Sidehatch, Indie Ambassador is a software development company currently in pre-beta, slated to launch during 2011 with a new platform geared towards independent artists. Though not yet released, the platform is 'intended to create a horizontal playing field for bands seeking to do business.'

=== Indie Ambassador TV ===
Indie Ambassador TV, a YouTube channel and an internet blog presented by Indie Ambassador (see above), is designed to feature performances and interviews from a variety of artists who represent the growing trend for independence in the entertainment industry.

=== Apprenticeship program ===
Ben Maitland-Lewis and Christopher Thomas of Sidehatch Entertainment lead an 8th Grade Academy apprenticeship program (in addition to a college-level internship program) on CD Business. They teach students the fundamentals of creating a Business Plan, a Marketing Plan, how to identify their target audience, pitch the project, and produce a CD to be sold to their local communities and businesses. The money raised from these exercises is invested through the Summit Group and goes to the Alumni Scholarship Fund for the student's college tuition.

== Discography ==
Artist	Album Title	Released
Spiritual Rez	Spiritual Rez	2005
The Thickness	Girth Control	2006
KID:NAP:KIN	Touring The Riot Scene	2006
Thick As Thieves	We Planted Driftwood And Nothing Changed	2006
September Twilight	Evolution	2006
Shanghai Thrills	Goodbye Guilt, Hello Lies	2007
Zen Robbi	Pawn Gone King	2007
Citizen Schools	General Eclectic - Vol III	2007
The Thickness	The Kids'll Love It	2007
Thick As Thieves	True Believers In The Long Walk Home	2008
KID:NAP:KIN	Hush Now...	2008
Barnacle	Friends Of B	2008
Citizen Schools	General Eclectic - Vol IV	2008
September Twilight	Evolution	2008
The Thickness	The Thickness	2008
Half Pint	Compilation	2009
The Thickness	Recession Special	2009
Citizen Schools	General Eclectic - Vol V	2009
Zen Robbi	Heavy Lies The Crown	2010
Piebald	Nobody's Robot's - documentary DVD	2010
Piebald	Nobody's Robot's - live concert	2010
The Murder Mile	Rebel Hearts	2010
The Thickness	Karaoke Headliner	2010
