= Dave Atchison =

- Origin: Portland, Oregon
- Genres: Hardcore punk; heavy metal; D-beat; crust punk
- Occupation: Musician
- Instrument: Drums
- Years active: 1997–present
- Labels: Jade Tree, Southern Lord Records, Havoc Records, Fat Wreck Chords
- Formerly of: From Ashes Rise, No Parade, Smoke or Fire

Dave Atchison is an American musician based in Portland, Oregon. Atchison, a Nashville native, is a founding member of the hardcore punk band From Ashes Rise, a band in which he played from 1997–2005, and again from 2009 to the present. During the hiatus of From Ashes Rise from 2005 to 2009, he played drums in Smoke or Fire, recording and touring with the band until his departure in 2009. Atchison currently resides in Portland, Oregon.

== Discography ==
=== With From Ashes Rise (drums) ===
- Fragments of a Fallen Sky 7-inch EP Clean Plate Records (1997)
- Life And Death 7-inch EP Partners in Crime Records (1998)
- Concrete And Steel LP Feral Ward Records (2000)
- Silence LP Feral Ward Records (2001)
- Split LP with Victims Havoc Records (2002)
- Nightmares LP Jade Tree Records (2003)
- Live Hell LP Jade Tree Records (2010)

=== With No Parade (bass) ===
- Nightsticks And Justice EP Partners in Crime Records (2000)
- Ceaseless Fire LP Partners in Crime Records (2001)

=== With Smoke or Fire (drums) ===
- This Sinking Ship (2007)
