= We Are the Only Friends We Have =

Studio album by Piebald
- Released: February 19, 2002
- Recorded: October 1–30, 2001 at Q Division Studios Somerville, Massachusetts
- Genres: Emo, indie rock, pop punk
- Length: 43:40; 83:46 (Reissue)
- Labels: Big Wheel Recreation; Iodine
- Producer: Paul Q. Kolderie

Piebald chronology
If It Weren't For Venetian Blinds, It Would Be Curtains For Us All (1999)	We Are the Only Friends We Have (2002)	All Ears All Eyes All The Time (2004)

Alternate cover

Professional ratings
Review scores
Source	Rating
AllMusic	4/5 stars

We Are the Only Friends We Have is a studio album by the Boston-based rock band Piebald.

On October 29, 2024, a Deluxe Edition was released digitally, with an announced for release on vinyl with bonus tracks composed of B-sides, demos, acoustic versions and covers, released in January 2025 via Iodine Recordings.

== Track listing ==
All music is composed by Piebald.

Original Release
No.	Title	Length
1.	"King of the Road"	4:26
2.	"Just a Simple Plan"	3:34
3.	"American Hearts"	3:10
4.	"Long Nights"	3:58
5.	"Fear and Loathing on Cape Cod"	4:10
6.	"The Monkey Versus the Robot"	3:06
7.	"Karate Chops for Everyone but Us"	3:32
8.	"Rich People Can Breed"	2:57
9.	"It's Going to Get Worse Before it Gets Better"	3:49
10.	"The Stalker"	2:49
11.	"Look, I Just Don't Like You"	3:37
12.	"Sex Sells and (Unfortunately) I'm Buying"	4:53
Total length:		43:40

Deluxe Edition
No.	Title	Length
1.	"King of the Road"	4:26
2.	"Just a Simple Plan"	3:33
3.	"American Hearts"	3:09
4.	"Long Nights"	3:58
5.	"Fear and Loathing on Cape Cod"	4:07
6.	"The Monkey Versus the Robot"	3:03
7.	"Karate Chops for Everyone But Us"	3:29
8.	"Rich People Can Breed"	2:54
9.	"It's Going to Get Worse Before It Gets Better"	3:46
10.	"The Stalker"	2:48
11.	"Look, I Just Don't Like You"	3:34
12.	"Sex Sells and (Unfortunately) I'm Buying"	4:53
13.	"You Wouldn't Be A Piece Without a Mustache"	3:45
14.	"Leave My Mouth Alone"	2:46
15.	"The Stalker (Demo)"	2:58
16.	"The Monkey Versus the Robot (Demo)"	2:59
17.	"Look, I Just Don't Like You (Demo)"	3:36
18.	"Elizabeth"	4:07
19.	"The King"	4:36
20.	"Cities"	2:16
21.	"It's Going to Get Worse Before It Gets Better (Acoustic)"	3:05
22.	"Strangers (The Kinks cover, Acoustic)"	3:04
23.	"No One Else (Weezer Cover 2002)"	3:02
24.	"Bad Scene, Everyone's Fault (Jawbreaker Cover 2001)"	2:14
25.	"The Christmas Song (Live)"	1:38
Total length:		83:46
