= Gay for Johnny Depp =

American hardcore band

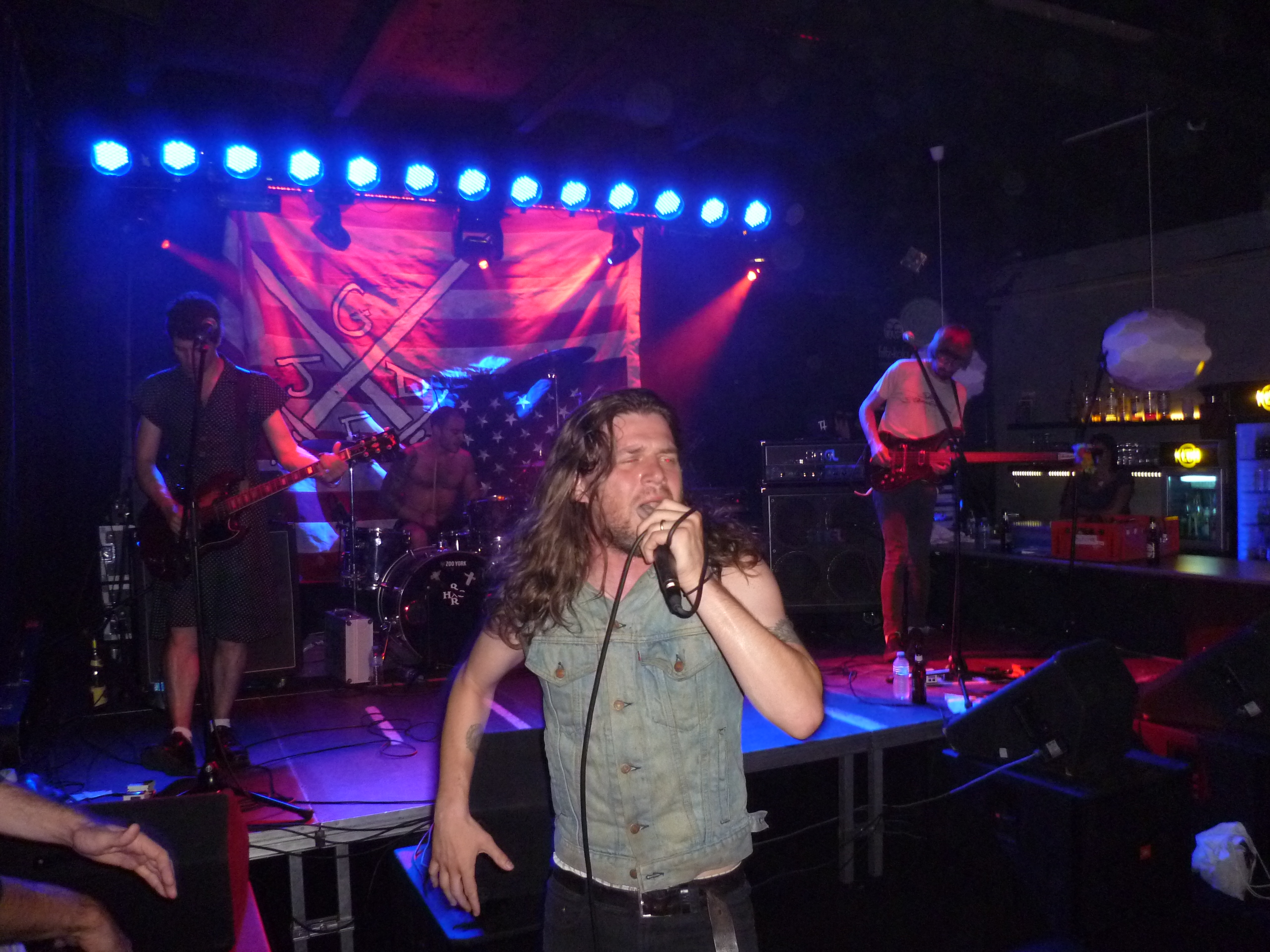
- Gay for Johnny Depp live in Saarbrücken (2011)

Background information
- Origin: New York City, U.S.
- Genres: Hardcore punk; queercore; heavy metal; mathcore
- Years active: 2004–2011
- Label: Captains of Industry
- Past members: Sid Jagger; Marty Leopard; Chelsea Piers; JJ Samanen; Arab Diesel

Gay for Johnny Depp was an American hardcore band formed in New York City. Members were Sid Jagger (guitar), Marty Leopard (vocals), Chelsea Piers (bass), JJ Samanen (drums). They were known for the lyrical content of their songs, which is often concerned with the band's homoerotic obsession over the actor Johnny Depp.

== History ==
Formed from ex-members of post-hardcore bands Garrison and Instruction in 2004, Gay for Johnny Depp released their first recording effort, Erotically Charged Dance Songs for the Desperate, on 12 July 2004.

The band recorded their second EP, Blood: The Natural Lubricant (An Apocalyptic Adventure Beyond Sodom and Gomorrah), in the summer of 2005, and released it on 19 September 2005 on the UK label Captains of Industry. Gay for Johnny Depp played their first ever UK show on September 14, 2005, in Exeter, supporting Million Dead. During the show, frontman Marty Leopard was punched by an angry crowd member and had to go to the hospital to receive 5 stitches in his face.GIGWISE | Gay For Johnny Depp Attacked By Fan

The band's first full-length album, The Politics of Cruelty, was released on 5 November 2007. The band's second studio album What Doesn't Kill You, Eventually Kills You (alluding the Nietzsche aphorism) was released on February 14, 2011. Their second EP, Blood: The Natural Lubricant (An Apocalyptic Adventure Beyond Sodom and Gomorrah) was re-released in September 2012, this time on vinyl limited to 300 copies through independent UK label Moshtache Records.

== Discography ==
=== Albums ===
- The Politics of Cruelty (2007)
- Manthology: A Tireless Exercise in Narcissism Featuring Gay for Johnny Depp's Excellent Cadavers (2010)
- What Doesn't Kill You, Eventually Kills You (2011)

=== EPs ===
- Erotically Charged Dance Songs for the Desperate (2004)
- Blood: The Natural Lubricant (An Apocalyptic Adventure Beyond Sodom and Gomorrah) (2005)
- The Ski Mask Orgy (2009)
