= Candy Hearts (band) =

American pop-punk band formed 2009

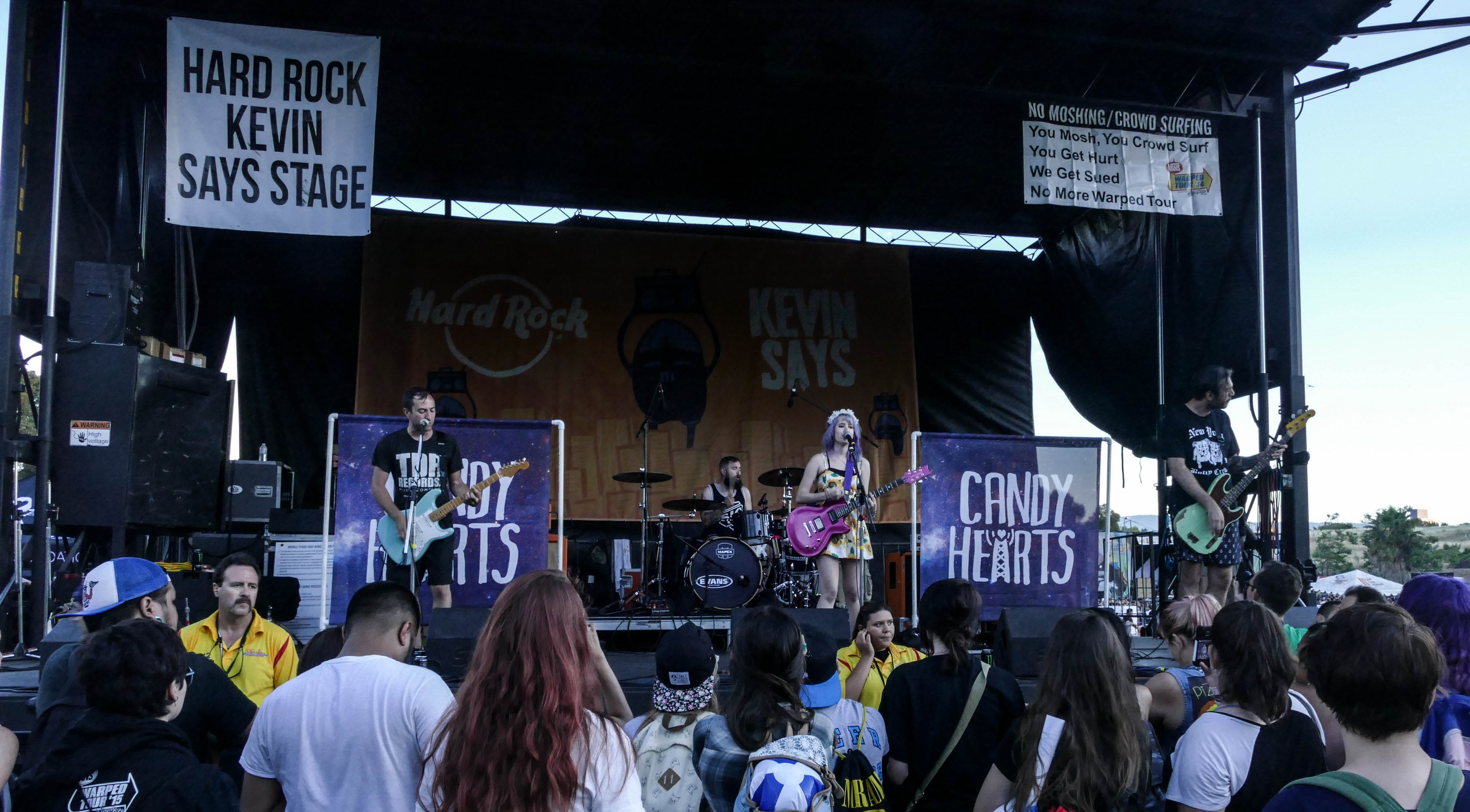
- Candy Hearts performing at 2015 Warped Tour

Background information
- Origin: New Jersey/New York, United States
- Genres: Pop punk, Synth pop, power pop, emo
- Years active: 2009–2017, 2024
- Labels: Iodine Recordings, Violently Happy Records, Bridge 9 Records, Kind of Like Records
- Spinoffs: Best Ex
- Past members: Mariel Loveland; Greg Baldwin; Nick Noto; Christina Picciano; Christian Migliorese; Kris Hayes; Matt Ferraro; John Clifford; Matt Florio
- Website: www.candyheartsband.com

Candy Hearts was an American pop rock band from New Jersey and New York, formed in 2009 by singer/guitarist Mariel Loveland and guitarist Kris Hayes. As the band’s primary songwriter, Loveland was the only member to see through every one of its incarnations.

== Background ==
The band's first collection of demos, "Ripped Up Jeans and Silly Dreams", was released for free online in 2010 but never saw a physical release. It featured Loveland, Hayes (who also played bass on the recording) and drummer Louie Aronowitz. Aronowitz later left the band, and was replaced by drummer Nick Noto. They added bassist Greg Baldwin, and Hayes switched from the live bass player to lead guitar. Noto then left the group in 2011 and was replaced by Christina Picciano. A new song, "What I'm Made Of," was released for free on their Bandcamp page the same year. The band also released a split seven-inch with Sister Kisser, which featured two new songs. Baldwin departed after the sessions, and was replaced by Christian Migliorese.

This line-up would go on to record the band's second album, titled Everything's Amazing And Nobody's Happy on Kind of Like Records. Picciano was the next member to depart in early 2012, and was replaced by Matthew Ferraro. An acoustic EP, titled simply Acoustic EP, was released in March 2012. The song featured acoustic versions of the band's songs, and was released to raise funds for further recording and studio time. In the coming months, the band teamed up with producer and New Found Glory guitarist, Chad Gilbert, to record their EP "The Best Ways to Disappear". The EP was rated #2 on Kerrang's list of "Top EPs of 2012."

In April 2013, Migliorese was replaced by John Clifford. The band also released a seven-inch, entitled Miles & Interstates, via Bridge Nine Records that year. Kerrang rated the single, "Miles & Interstates," as #40 in their list of "101 Songs that Rocked 2013." 2014 saw Hayes, the only other original member of the band, depart to start a family and to be a stay-at-home dad. He was not replaced, converting the band into a trio.

In June 2014, the band released their third album, All The Ways You Let Me Down. The album was again produced by New Found Glory band member Chad Gilbert. and charted on Billboard at #8 (Alternative New Artist Chart) and #32 (Heatseekers Chart). The band went on a tour in the spring of 2014 with We Are In The Crowd, William Beckett, State Champs, and Set It Off. In the summer of 2014, the band embarked on a tour with Seaway, Stickup Kid, and Driver Friendly. Loveland would later speak negatively of this tour, accusing Seaway's manager of abusive behaviour.

In the fall of 2014, the band toured with New Found Glory in the United States, Ireland, and England. Later that year, Billboard named them one of the top ten pop-punk bands that people need to know. and NJ.com voted them one of the 35 bands you need to hear in 2015 In December 2014, Spin Magazine named Candy Hearts' single "I Miss You" one of the Best Songs Of 2014. All The Ways You Let Me Down was also voted as one of the best pop albums of 2014 by Billboard and one of the top albums of 2014 by The Houston Chronicle.

On May 5, 2017, Loveland announced that she would be continuing as a solo artist under the name Best Ex. She described the change to Billboard as "taking everything that Candy Hearts is — everything that I am — and giving it a breakup makeover."

In April of 2024, the band announced that they would be reuniting for a one-off performance at The Fest in Gainesville, FL for the ten year anniversary of All The Ways You Let Me Down. This marked the first time Loveland, Ferraro, and Clifford would be performing together since 2016; they added lead guitarist Matt Florio, who is Loveland’s live bandmate from Best Ex, as part of the performance. Along with the reunion, the band released a collection of rarities and B-sides called You Could Be Anyone on Iodine Recordings.

== Influences ==
The band cites several, across the board influences. Loveland has cited acts such as The Breeders, Juliana Hatfield and Taylor Swift as influences.

== Members ==
Final line-up

- Mariel Loveland – lead vocals, rhythm guitar (2009–2017, 2024)
- Matthew Ferraro – drums (2012–2017, 2024)
- John Clifford – bass (2013–2017, 2024)
- Matt Florio – lead guitar, backing vocals (2024)

Former members

- Kris Hayes – lead guitar, backing vocals (2009–2014), bass (2009–2010)
- Louie Aronowitz – drums (2009–2010)
- Nick Noto – drums (2010–2011)
- Greg Baldwin – bass (2010–2011)
- Christina Picciano – drums (2011–2012)
- Christian Migliorese – bass (2011–2013)
- Bobby Vaughn – lead guitar, backing vocals (2014–2017)

== Discography ==
Studio albums

- Ripped Up Jeans and Silly Dreams (2010)
- Everything's Amazing & Nobody's Happy (2011)
- All the Ways You Let Me Down (2014)

Compilation albums

- You Could be Anyone (2024)

EPs

- Acoustic EP (2012)
- The Best Ways to Disappear (2012)
- Miles & Interstates (2013)
- Acoustic Hearts (2015)

Splits

- Sister Kisser/Candy Hearts (2011)
