= This Sinking Ship =

Studio album by Smoke or Fire
- Released: February 20, 2007
- Genre: Punk rock, pop punk, melodic hardcore
- Length: 33:53
- Label: Fat Wreck Chords
- Producer: Matt Allison

Smoke or Fire chronology
Above the City (2005)	This Sinking Ship (2007)	Prehistoric Knife Fight (2010)

Professional ratings
Review scores
Source	Rating
AllMusic	4.5/5 stars
Punknews.org	3.5/5 stars
Revolver	3.5/5 stars

This Sinking Ship is an album by punk band Smoke or Fire, released in 2007.

== Critical reception ==
Exclaim! wrote: "The tunes are catchy and it's easy to tap your foot along without even realising you're doing it. The production is excellent, allowing every instrument to shine ... You're not going to find anything new here but it's a fun ride." AllMusic called This Sinking Ship "a fabulous album, whose weighty lyrical discourse is perfectly ballasted by the invigorating music that surrounds it." Alternative Press wrote: "Distinctive hooks, infectious melodies and fist-pumping choruses: It’s all here, and it sounds damn near perfect."

== Track listing ==
No.	Title	Length
1.	"What Separates Us All"	2:27
2.	"The Patty Hearst Syndrome"	3:00
3.	"Melatonin"	2:10
4.	"This Sinking Ship"	3:24
5.	"Irish Handcuffs"	3:28
6.	"Little Bohemia"	2:04
7.	"I'll Be Gone"	2:34
8.	"Shine"	3:36
9.	"Breadwinner"	3:01
10.	"Life Imitating Art"	2:07
11.	"Cars"	2:00
12.	"Folding The Pages"	4:06

== Personnel ==
- Joe McMahon (vocals/guitar)
- Jeremy Cochran (guitar)
- Ken Gurley (bass)
- Dave Atchison (drums)
