= Above the City (Smoke or Fire album) =

Above The City

Studio album by Smoke or Fire
- Released: March 22, 2005
- Genres: Punk rock, pop punk, melodic hardcore
- Length: 24:06
- Label: Fat Wreck Chords
- Producer: Fat Mike

Smoke or Fire chronology
Worker's Union (2003)	Above The City (2005)	This Sinking Ship (2007)

Above The City is the debut album by American punk rock band Smoke or Fire, released in 2005. It was produced by Fat Mike under Fat Wreck Records, and was the band's first full-length album. Above the City has drawn comparison to Against Me! and Lawrence Arms, and has been called a "punching sincere punk rock album". The album reached No. 62 in CMJ's "Radio 100" in 2005, spending at least 5 weeks on the list.

== Critical reception ==
Professional ratings
Review scores
Source	Rating
AllMusic	2.5/5 stars
Punknews.org	4.5/5 stars

In a positive review, Style Weekly wrote that "these songs run on a maximum of speed and a minimum of time, half of them touring the landscape of America and the other half, the landscape of emotion."

== Track listing ==
All tracks by Joe McMahon

No.	Title	Length
1.	"California's Burning"	2:27
2.	"Filter"	1:51
3.	"Cops and Drugs"	1:29
4.	"Goodbye to Boston"	2:31
5.	"Culture as Given"	1:49
6.	"Delawhere"	1:29
7.	"Loving, Self-Loathing"	1:55
8.	"Fire Escapes"	1:38
9.	"South Paw"	1:49
10.	"The Hard Way"	1:50
11.	"Cryin' Shame"	2:44
12.	"Point Break"	2:20

== Personnel ==
- Jeremy Cochran – guitar
- Ethan Dussault – engineer, mixing, audio production
- Fat Mike – producer
- Ryan Greene – mixing
- Ken Gurley – bass
- Adam Krammer – engineer, audio engineer
- Nick Maggiore – drums
- Joe McMahon – guitar, vocals
- Chrissy Piper – photography
- Brad Vance – mastering
- Winni Wintermeyer – design, photography
