= The Politics of Cruelty (album) =

Studio album by Gay for Johnny Depp
- Released: November 5, 2007
- Length: 21:40
- Label: Captains of Industry

Gay for Johnny Depp chronology
Blood: The Natural Lubricant (An Apocalyptic Adventure Beyond Sodom and Gomorrah) (2005)	The Politics of Cruelty (2007)	Manthology: A Tireless Exercise in Narcissism Featuring Gay for Johnny Depp's Excellent Cadavers (2009)

Professional ratings
Review scores
Source	Rating
Art Rocker	link
New Noise	link
NME	3.5/5 stars
Rocklouder	link
Rockmidgets.com	link

The Politics of Cruelty is the debut full-length album by hardcore band Gay for Johnny Depp. It was released on November 5, 2007.

== Track listing ==
1. "Cumpassion" – 2:22
2. "You Have a Theory, I Have a Gun" – 1:12
3. "Belief in God Is So Adorable" – 1:43
4. "Lights Out!" – 2:12
5. "Noise" – 0:20
6. "Point the Finger (Juicy's Last $)" – 1:24
7. "Happens" – 0:24
8. "Very Little Good Happens Between 3 and 4 in the Morning" – 2:00
9. "Delirium Approaches (Slut Dust)" – 2:00
10. "To the Alcoholics: Life Is Depressing" – 1:34
11. "Here" – 0:22
12. "I Hate Our Freedom (Fuck You Gladys, I'm on Vacation)" – 6:07

== Personnel ==
- Sid Jagger – guitar, keyboards, vocals
- Marty Leppard – vocals
- Chelsea Piers – bass, percussion, keyboards
- JJ Samanen – drums, piano
