= Erotically Charged Dance Songs for the Desperate =

Extended play by Gay for Johnny Depp

EP by Gay for Johnny Depp
- Released: July 2004
- Genre: Hardcore/Metal
- Length: 10:38
- Label: Firefly Recordings

Gay for Johnny Depp chronology
Erotically Charged Dance Songs for the Desperate (2004)	Blood: The Natural Lubricant (An Apocalyptic Adventure Beyond Sodom and Gomorrah) (2005)

Erotically Charged Dance Songs for the Desperate is the first EP by hardcore/metal band Gay for Johnny Depp. It was released in 2004 and is now out of print.

== Track listing ==
1. "Kill the Cool Kids" – 1:59
2. "Lights Out" – 2:20
3. "She Said "I Like This One"" – 2:37
4. "At Least Be a Target" – 2:11
5. "He Loved It So Much He Went Mad" – 1:31

== Personnel ==
- Sid Jagger - Guitar
- Marty Leopard - Vocals
- F. Cokboi - Bass
- JJ Samanen - Drums
