= Smoke or Fire =

American punk rock band

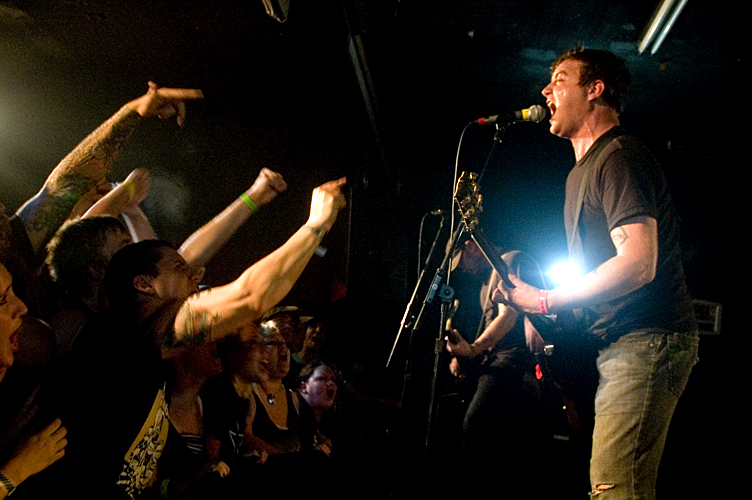
- Fest Five, October 2006. Photo by Brian Kelleher.

Background information
- Also known as: Jericho, Jericho RVA
- Origin: Boston, Massachusetts, U.S.
- Genres: Punk rock, pop punk, melodic hardcore
- Years active: 1998–present
- Labels: Fat Wreck Chords, Iodine Recordings
- Members: Joe McMahon; James Muñoz; Jeremy Cochran; Dave Atchison
- Past members: Ken Gurley; Ryan Parrish; Nick Maggiore; Chris Brand; Bill Ironfield

Smoke or Fire is an American punk rock band from Boston, Massachusetts, United States.

== History ==
=== Early history as Jericho (1998–2004) ===
The band originally formed in Boston in 1998, when western Massachusetts native Joe McMahon got together with Chris Brand, Bill Ironfield, and Nick Maggiore, who hailed from New Hampshire. The four met while attending Boston University. Originally calling themselves Jericho, the band released their debut album, When the Battery Dies, in 2000. After the release of this record, Chris Brand left the band, and a new guitarist, Jeremy Cochran, replaced him. Their fan base grew as they played DIY basement shows and small clubs throughout the Northeast.

After the release of When the Battery Dies, the quartet moved to Richmond, Virginia, where they worked on their second album. This was when Bill Ironfield left the band, and Ken Gurley joined on bass, with Joe McMahon taking over guitar.

It was at about this time that the band was contacted by a 1970s-era Christian rock band from Houston, Texas, also called Jericho, to inform them that the name was already taken. To avoid confusion and legal action, the band amended their name to Jericho RVA. The initials were a nod to their new hometown of Richmond, Virginia.

Jericho RVA is the name that appears on their 2003 extended play Worker's Union. An older version, released under the band's original name Jericho, does not include the song "Oxygen" that is on the Jericho RVA release. The other six songs of the EP are the same on both records. Worker's Union caught the attention of reviewers, labels, and established bands interested in taking them out on tour, such as NOFX and Fat Wreck Chords.

=== Name change to Smoke or Fire (2004–2010) ===
Jericho RVA changed their name again to Smoke or Fire in 2004, citing continued protests from Christian groups who complained about the religious "blasphemy" of the band adopting a bible-derived name.

Due to the strength of the Worker's Union EP, Smoke or Fire were approached by the independent California punk rock label Fat Wreck Chords in late 2004. Their debut full-length album, Above the City, was co-produced by Fat Mike of NOFX and was released in March 2005. After a tour to support Above the City, the band's drummer, Nick Maggiore, departed the group.

Shortly before the band began recording their second full-length album This Sinking Ship, they hired a new drummer, David Atchison, from the neo-crust band From Ashes Rise. The band released their second album This Sinking Ship on February 20, 2007. Later in 2007, Ken Gurley departed the band. The next year, Gwomper from Avail joined as the band's new bassist.

Their third and, to date, latest album, The Speakeasy, was released November 9, 2010. Some of the tracks were released ahead of time as teasers, such as "Neon Lights" and the title track "The Speakeasy".

=== Joe McMahon's solo career and Beauty Fades (2016–present) ===
Joe McMahon relocated to Münster, Germany, in 2013. While there, he recorded acoustic covers of several Smoke or Fire songs, including "Neon Lights." He released his debut solo album, Another Life, on September 2, 2016, under Smartpunk in the United States and Gunner Records in Europe.

In 2022, the Boston-based label Iodine Recordings announced their intentions to release Beauty Fades. The compilation features all the songs from the Worker's Union extended play, as well as other previously unreleased tracks and B-sides. Beauty Fades was released on May 27, 2022.

== Members ==
- Joe McMahon – vocals, guitar
- James Muñoz – bass
- Jeremy Cochran – guitar
- Dave Atchison – drums

=== Past members ===
- Ken Gurley – bass
- Ryan Parrish – drums
- Nick Maggiore – drums
- Chris Brand – guitar
- Bill Ironfield – guitar

== Discography ==
- When the Battery Dies (released as Jericho [RVA] in 2000; re-released as Smoke or Fire in 2015)
- Worker's Union EP (2003) (released as Jericho [RVA])
- Above the City (2005)
- This Sinking Ship (2007)
- Prehistoric Knife Fight 7" (2010)
- The Speakeasy (2010)
- Beauty Fades (2022)

== Music videos ==
- "California's Burning" (2005)
- "The Patty Hearst Syndrome" (2007)
- "It All Went Black" (2016)

== Production ==
- Billy Liar / Some Legacy (2019)
