= Errortype: Eleven =

American punk/indie band

Errortype:11
- Origin: New York City, U.S.
- Genres: Post-hardcore, indie, emo, punk, alternative rock
- Years active: 1997–2002, 2009, 2012, 2018-present
- Labels: Some, Revelation, Crank!
- Past members: Arthur Shepherd; Phil Hanratty; Adam Marino; Scott Martin; Erik Matheu; Keith Moore; Leroy Getaway; Sammy Siegler; Ti Krek; Steve Sanderson

Errortype:11 (also known as Errortype:Eleven or ET11) was an American punk/indie band formed in New York City. Members were Arthur (Arty) Shepherd (guitar, vocals), Phil Hanratty (guitar, vocals), Adam Marino, Scott Martin (bass), Erik Matheu, Keith Moore, Leroy Getaway, Sammy Siegler, Ti Kreck, Steve Sanderson (drums).

== History ==
Errortype:11 were formed in 1997 by ex-members of Mind Over Matter, Bad Trip, Clockwise, and Milhouse. Because of their backgrounds, the band was acclaimed before they even started practicing.

Errortype:11's eponymous debut on Some Records, the record label started by Walter Schreifels who played in many New York hardcore bands, most notably Youth of Today and Gorilla Biscuits, the (post-hardcore band Quicksand and CIV), was recorded in seven days in Ray Martin's makeshift Operating Room. The album was heralded by numerous bands, fanzines, and the occasional trade magazine as one of the best new albums of 1998.

Amplified to Rock, the band's last release on Some Records, was produced by John Agnello (Dinosaur Jr., Sonic Youth, Screaming Trees), who was impressed by the band after working with them on the interim EP the band recorded for Crank! Records in July 1999.

The strength of their records coupled with a reputation for their energetic live performances led to tours with Samiam, Gameface, Grade, At the Drive-In, Shades Apart, The Dismemberment Plan and many others, helping Errortype:11 build a strong national and European fan base. Their touring success was made evident by the long lines surrounding local club stops such as the Mercury Lounge and Brownies in New York City, as well as other East Coast rock and roll stomping grounds.

Band members Arthur Shepherd, Adam Marino and Ti Kreck went on to form Instruction.

The band played a reunion show at Mercury Lounge on August 8, 2009.

== Discography ==
- Superstore, 7", Some Records, 1997
- Errortype:11, Some Records, June 1998
- The Crank EP, Crank Records, July 1999
- What's Up Bro?, Gameface/Errortype:11 split EP, Revelation Records, March 2000
- Amplified to Rock, Some Records, April 2000
- Singles Club 2, Hundred Reasons/Hell Is For Heroes/Errortype:11 split fanclub cd, Columbia Records, March 2002

== Trivia ==
In series 18 episode 5 of BBC TV's Would I Lie to You, blind comedian Chris McCausland claimed to have complained to a member of the band that Errortype: Eleven's heavy metal wasn't heavy enough. It turned out that, being blind, he had mixed up E11's CD with another heavy metal band, Eyelid. The anecdote was confirmed to be true.
