= Piebald (band) =

American rock band

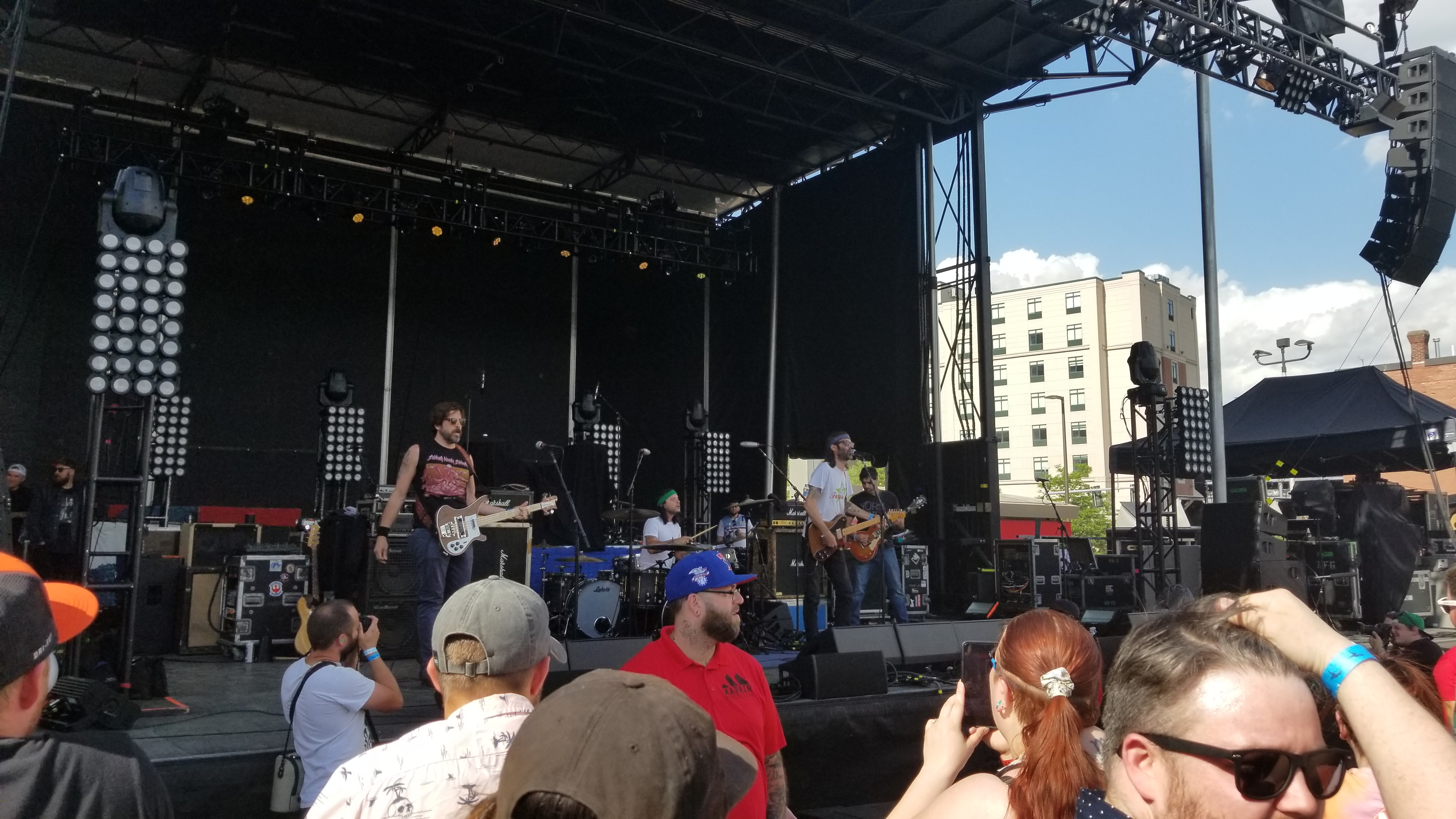

Background information
- Origin: Andover, Massachusetts, U.S.
- Genres: Alternative rock; emo; indie rock; pop punk; power pop; post-hardcore; hardcore punk (early)
- Years active: 1994–2008, 2010, 2016–present
- Labels: Iodine, SideOneDummy, Hydra Head, Rise, Big Wheel Recreation
- Members: Andrew Bonner; Luke Garro; Travis Shettel; Aaron Stuart
- Past members: Alex Garcia Rivera; Jon Sullivan
- Website: piebald.com

Piebald is an American rock band. Piebald started as a hardcore punk band in Andover, Massachusetts, out of the same scene that produced Converge and Cave In. Originally a key Massachusetts post-hardcore band often seen touring with fellow DIY hardcore bands such as Jesuit, Reversal of Man, and Harvest during the mid to late 1990s, they later moved to the Boston suburb of Somerville and became a staple of the Greater Boston indie rock scene.

== History ==
Their first gig, a "Battle of the Bands", is chronicled on their two-CD set Barely Legal/All Ages. From the liner notes: "... from the sound board 1994 battle of the bands, Piebald lost."

From then on, they recorded and played shows together semi-seriously. In 1995, Piebald started recording, which amounted to a four-track demo and a two-track split record. Their driving hardcore sound during these years was highlighted by the technical playing of drummer Jon Sullivan and the deep screams of vocalist/guitarist Travis Shettel.

=== Post-hardcore ===
A turning point in Piebald's career came when they recorded seven tracks for a self-release that came to be known as Sometimes Friends Fight. Their musical sound had greatly matured, and Shettel's lyricism and singing was finally brought to the forefront of the band's music. Another two seven-inches later, Piebald was ready for another metamorphosis.

Eleven tracks recorded at Salad Days became the first record to showcase Piebald's signature sound and wry jokes. Traditionally the most sought-after Piebald recording (before it was immortalized in its entirety on All Ages), When Life Hands You Lemons was considered to be Piebald's best music yet. This release furthered the lyrical style that had been growing within the band, and also showcased the first lead vocals by lead guitarist Aaron Stuart, and a piano track by Shettel.

=== Breakthrough ===
Following If it Weren't for Venetian Blinds, It Would Be Curtains for Us All, Piebald released We Are the Only Friends We Have. It featured the singles Just a Simple Plan and American Hearts which were played on MTV and college radio.

The following album, All Ears, All Eyes, All the Time, the band's first release on Side One Dummy Records, featured piano-driven compositions, along with horn arrangements and vocal harmonies. Music videos for the songs Part of Your Body is Made Out of Rock and I Haven't Tried It were produced.

Accidental Gentlemen, their last album of original work before reuniting, was released in 2007.

=== Retirement ===
On August 19, 2007, a bulletin was posted from the band's official MySpace page as well as in the "News" section of their official website, announcing the dissolution of Piebald.

"Friends, friends, friends…we have not posted anything anywhere in quite some time and our word on the street is that this is our last tour. All the preceding words are true and we have decided to put Piebald to rest. The past fifteen years or so have been nothing short of extremely incredible. We have met lots of people, been to lots of places and experienced a whole lot of life. In 1994 we started making music, screenprinting our own seven inch covers and borrowing our parents cars to get to shows. Since then, we have traveled the globe, released many records, and played thousands of shows; pedaling the righteous name of piebald to all whose paths we crossed. In celebration of the many years of good times and incredible accomplishments, we have decided to dedicate this tour to us; Piebald. Thanks to all who have helped in any and every way…families, friends, girlfriends, vans, bands, fans, promoters, labels, booking agent, lawyer, clubs, engineers, producers, and those who we forgot to mention. Now, this is not a teary eyed time, people. This is a time of new beginnings, positive vibes, and a congratulatory nod to the past. There has been talk of a few shows to give the band an official sendoff, but as of yet, those shows are not booked and unknown. Thanks for all the undying support. We love you."

The band played three final farewell shows in April 2008: April 17 at the Bowery Ballroom in New York City and April 18 and 19 at The Middle East nightclub in Cambridge, Massachusetts.

Their final release is a live DVD / documentary called Nobody's Robots: A Farewell to Piebald. It includes the entire farewell show in 5.1 surround sound, a retrospective documentary and an anthology of the band's several music videos. Audio from the show is exclusively available through iTunes. The DVD was released nationwide July 13, 2010, on Sidehatch Entertainment Group.

=== Reunion ===
Piebald reunited for two shows at the Bamboozle music festivals in Anaheim, California, on March 28, 2010, and in East Rutherford, New Jersey, on May 2, 2010. Between these two shows, Rise Records released a three-volume set containing out-of-print releases from the band. The set contains material recorded and released by Piebald while signed with Big Wheel Recreation from 1999 to 2002. Each disc also includes various B-sides and rarities.

On March 22, 2016, Piebald was listed on the lineup for the Wrecking Ball festival on August 12–14 at The Masquerade in Atlanta, a final series of performances celebrating the soon-to-be-vacated legendary venue which prompted several retired bands to play one-off reunions. This was the first hint that Piebald might return for more shows; then, on April 6, 2016, Piebald announced an 11-show 2016 reunion tour, playing the Wrecking Ball along the way. This included east coast dates as well as 5 shows out west with their past tour buddies Limbeck, bringing them through San Francisco, Anaheim, Los Angeles, San Diego, and Phoenix.

Following this string of shows, Piebald has toured at least once a year from 2017 through 2023.

Other significant reunion shows:

- May 28, 2017: Boston Calling 2017
- September 15, 2018: Riot Fest 2018 in Chicago
- June 4, 2022: Piebald played the main stage at Sticks and Stones Fest, the Worcester, MA stop on a tour to celebrate the 20th anniversary of the release of Sticks and Stones by New Found Glory. Their set consisted of mostly songs from their 20-year-old album, We Are the Only Friends We Have.

=== Other projects ===
Since Piebald, Travis Shettel has performed in The Was, TS and The Past Haunts, and The Hunting Accident with Aaron Stuart.

=== Iodine Recordings ===
On June 7, 2024, the band signed with Iodine Recordings.

In early 2025, the label released a newly remastered vinyl reissue of We Are the Only Friends We Have. Later in December, the band announced the vinyl reissue of If It Weren't for Venetian Blinds, It Would Be Curtains for Us All, released in early 2026.

On March 12, 2026 the band announced their sixth studio album Tales For The Rages, released in June 12 of the same year through Iodine Recordings.

== Band members ==
Current members

- Travis Shettel – vocals, guitar (1994–2008; 2016–present)
- Aaron Stuart – guitar, vocals (1994–2008; 2016–present)
- Andrew Bonner – bass (1994–2008; 2016–present)
- Luke Garro – drums (2001–2008; 2016–present)

Touring members

- Jim "Handsome" Carroll – bass (2002–2007)

Former members

- Jon Sullivan – drums (1994–1999; 2001)
- Alex Garcia-Rivera – drums (1999–2001)

== Discography ==
=== Studio albums ===
Title	Label	Year
When Life Hands You Lemons	Hydra Head Records	1997
If It Weren't for Venetian Blinds, It Would Be Curtains for Us All	Big Wheel Recreation/Iodine Recordings	1999
We Are the Only Friends We Have	Big Wheel Recreation/Iodine Recordings	2002
All Ears All Eyes All the Time	SideOneDummy Records	2004
Accidental Gentlemen	SideOneDummy Records	2007
Tales for the Rages	Iodine Recordings	2026

=== EPs, Singles, and Splits ===
Title	Recording Artist(s)	Label	Year	Type
Piebald / Sevenpercentsolution Split	Piebald, Seven percent solution	Federation Records	1995	Split 7"
Sometimes Friends Fight	Piebald	Point the Blame Records	1996	EP
Cave In / Piebald	Cave In, Piebald	Moo Cow Records	1996	Split 7"
Even After Thirteen Years, He's Still Not Coming Back	Piebald	Hydra Head Records	1996	7"
In Vain / Piebald Split	In Vain, Piebald	Contrast Records	1997	Split 7"
The Rock Revolution Will Not Be Televised	Piebald	Big Wheel Recreation	2000	EP
Piebald & River City High Sampler	Piebald, River City High	Big Wheel Recreation, Doghouse Records	2001	Split CD Sampler
Just a Simple Plan	Piebald	Big Wheel Recreation, Defiance Records	2002	EP
American Hearts	Piebald	Big Wheel Recreation	2002	Single
Accidental Gentlemen Sampler	Piebald	SideOneDummy Records	2007	CD Sampler
Piebald Presents to You, a Musical Christmas Adventure	Piebald	Photo Finish Records	2019	EP

=== Other Releases ===
Title	Recording Artist(s)	Label	Year	Type
Geek of the Week	Piebald	Self-Released	1995	Cassette
A Tribute to Weezer	Various Artists	Dead Droid Records	2000	Compilation
Barely Legal & All Ages	Various Artists	Big Wheel Recreation	2001	Compilation
Killa Bros and Killa Bees	Piebald	SideOneDummy Records	2005	Studio Album + DVD
Nobody's Robots: A Farewell to Piebald	Piebald	Sidehatch Entertainment Group	2010	DVD
Vol. I-III	Piebald	Rise Records	2011	Compilation
Marshall's Basement	Piebald	Self-Released	2016	Cassette
