= The Speakeasy (album) =

Studio album by Smoke or Fire
- Released: November 9, 2010
- Genre: Punk rock, pop punk, melodic hardcore
- Length: 33:46
- Label: Fat Wreck Chords
- Producer: Matt Allison

Smoke or Fire chronology
Prehistoric Knife Fight (2010)	The Speakeasy (2010)

Professional ratings
Review scores
Source	Rating
Punknews.org	4.5/5 stars
Rock Sound	9/10
Sputnikmusic	1.5/5

The Speakeasy is the third studio album by American punk rock band Smoke or Fire. It was released on November 9, 2010, on Fat Wreck Chords.

== Critical reception ==
Exclaim! wrote that "while The Speakeasy is good, it sounds as though the band got too comfortable with themselves." PopMatters wrote that "if you can get past some political self-congratulation, The Speakeasy is an energetic, often observant record."

== Track listing ==
No.	Title	Length
1.	"Integrity"	2:15
2.	"Monsters Among Us"	3:09
3.	"1968"	2:52
4.	"Sleep Walking"	2:54
5.	"Neon Light"	3:29
6.	"Hope and Anchor"	2:08
7.	"Honey, I Was Right About the War"	2:01
8.	"Porch Wine"	2:19
9.	"Everything Falls Apart"	2:39
10.	"Expatriate"	3:08
11.	"The Speakeasy"	2:06
12.	"Shotgun"	2:26
13.	"Utah"	2:21
