= Best Ex =

Solo alternative project

- Origin: Ramsey, New Jersey, U.S.
- Genres: Indie rock; indie pop; alternative rock
- Years active: 2017–present
- Labels: No Sleep, Alcopop!, Iodine Recordings
- Spinoff of: Candy Hearts
- Members: Mariel Loveland
- Website: bestexnj.com

Best Ex is the stage moniker of American songwriter Mariel Loveland. Loveland previously fronted the pop-punk band Candy Hearts before launching her solo project in 2017. Best Ex was named one of NJ.com's 32 artists to watch in 2022. The following year, she released her debut studio album, With A Smile.

== History ==
With Loveland at the helm, Best Ex initially began as an offshoot of Candy Hearts. In 2017, the band hired Alex Fitts as a producer, announced the project, and released their debut EP, Ice Cream Anti-Social, on Alcopop Records. During the release, they embarked on a co-headlining tour of the U.S. with Shane Henderson of Valencia, adding touring member Matthew Florio.

Ice Cream Anti-Social received coverage from publications like DIY (magazine) and Alternative Press (magazine), who called the band's poppier sound "Loveland’s perfect fit." The summer after the release, Best Ex performed on the final run of Warped Tour, where Loveland opened up to The New York Times about experiencing abuse within the music industry. She said, "Instead of my team and the people who worked for me being like 'We’ll do what we can to make you feel safe' ... it was 'Why did you open your mouth?'"

When Loveland returned home, she struggled to adjust to life off the road, penning an essay in Billboard about her experience. She ultimately enlisted Andy Tongren of Young Rising Sons as a producer and recorded what would become Good At Feeling Bad in his kitchen. Loveland later explained her decision to distance herself from the pop punk genre, relaunching Best Ex with heavy electronic and pop influences and signing to No Sleep Records.

In May 2020, amidst on-and-off coronavirus lockdowns, Best Ex released Good At Feeling Bad. Earmilk described the single as a "gorgeous contrast of melancholic lyrics against a pounding club beat." Loveland promoted the release in a virtual concert tribute to Joey Ramone with We Are Scientists and The Futureheads.

In 2022, Loveland signed to Iodine Recordings and released With a Smile, the project's first LP, in 2023.

The following year, she briefly reunited with Candy Hearts at The Fest for the 10-year anniversary of 'All The Ways You Let Me Down.'

== Discography ==
=== LPs ===
- With a Smile (2023)
- Good Girl (2026)

=== EPs ===
- Ice Cream Anti-Social (2017)
- Good At Feeling Bad (2020)

=== Singles ===
- "Die for you (Soft Faith Remix)" (2024)
- "Nightlife Alone" by Soft Faith (2024)
- "I Promise to Ruin Your Life (The Kickdrums Remix)" (2024)
