= Six Going On Seven =

American indie rock band

- Origin: Boston, Massachusetts
- Genres: Indie rock
- Years active: 1996–2001; 2024–present
- Labels: Hydra Head; Some; Doghouse; Spartan
- Members: Joshua English; James Bransford; Will Bartlett

Six Going On Seven is an indie rock band from Boston, Massachusetts consisting of Joshua English (vocals/bass), James Bransford (guitar) and Will Bartlett (drums).

During their tenure the band toured nationally several times, recorded three full-length albums, and two 7" singles (including a split with Hot Water Music). Their song "Readying" is used in the 2003 film The Station Agent. The band toured with Moods for Moderns, Elliott, Rocket From The Crypt, Seaweed, and No Knife among others. The band split in 2001 shortly after the release of their third album American't (or won't).

In 2024, the band announced their reunion, and their repressings of Self-Made Mess and Heartbreak's Got Backbeat on Iodine Recordings.

in February 18, 2025, the band signed to Spartan Records, and announced their fourth studio album, Human Tears, released on January 6, 2026.

== Discography ==
- Method Actor 7” (Hydra Head, 1996)
- Self-Made Mess (Some Records, 1997)
- Reverse Midas Split 7" /w/ Hot Water Music (Some Records, 1998)
- Heartbreak's Got Backbeat (Some Records, 1999)
- American't (or Won't) (Doghouse Records Big Wheel Recreation, 2001)
- Human Tears (Spartan Records, 2026)
