= Orange Island =

- Origin: Clinton, Massachusetts, United States
- Genres: Alternative rock, indie rock, post-hardcore, emo
- Years active: 1999–2005
- Labels: Iodine Recordings; Triple Crown Records; Rise Records
- Members: Charles Young; Joseph Gonzalez-Dufresne; David Gorman; Colin Spencer; Brendan Dickhaut
- Website: Official website

Orange Island was a rock band based out of the town Clinton, Massachusetts. Orange Island formed in 1996 when cousins Charles Young and Brendan Dickhaut started writing music together and had David Chouinard playing bass guitar. After writing songs together they asked their friend David Gorman to sing for the group. Orange Island wrote and recorded several demos before being signed to the Boston-based record label Iodine Recordings in 2000. The Shape of Calling was Orange Island's debut album and shortly after its release the band started touring the US with many well known bands including Brand New, The Movielife, Breaking Pangaea, Kill Verona and others. in 2002 Orange Island released their follow-up full length titled Everything You Thought You Knew. This album dealt with themes related to struggling with alcoholism and losing a close friend.

Orange Island went through several line up changes after the release of their second album (losing their bass player David Chouinard prior to its release) who left the band to join the military after 9/11. Several people filled in on bass until they took on Joseph Dufresne, a good friend who formerly played in the Boston band The Chase Scene. Joseph started playing second guitar, David Gorman started to only sing, and Colin Spencer (also of The Chase Scene) took over on bass.

Orange Island left Iodine Recordings and signed to Triple Crown Records and released a self titled CD that was very well received by reviewers and the indie scene. Orange Island toured for the new album with the punk band Tsunami Bomb.

In 2004 Orange Island released their final album titled The Morning After, which was released on the Oregon-based record label Rise Records. Orange Island disbanded shortly after this last release.

In October 2022, Iodine Recordings re-issued the 20th anniversary edition of their self-titled LP on vinyl. The release was remastered for vinyl by Alan Douches, repacked with all new artwork, and renamed One Night Stay.

== Final line-up ==
- Brendan Dickhaut - Guitar
- Joseph Gonzalez-Dufresne - Guitar
- David Gorman - Vocals
- Colin Spencer - Bass
- Charles Young - Drums

== Other members ==
- David Chouinard - Bass
- Jason Brodrick - Bass
- Brian Price - Bass

== Discography ==
- The Shape of Calling EP (2001)
- Everything You Thought You Knew (2002)
- Orange Island (2003)
- The Morning After EP (2004)
- Split w/ Garrison EP (2004)
- One Night Stay (2022)

== Compilation appearances ==
- Still Green Movie Soundtrack (2007) - "Pyretic Eyes (The Same Soap Opera)"
- Beer: The Movie Movie Soundtrack (2003) - "Stand Up, State Your Name"
- Gravity Rides Everything Iodine Sampler (2003) - "Finding the Casual"
