= Instruction (band) =

American alternative rock band

- Origin: Brooklyn, New York, US
- Genres: Alternative rock, indie rock, hard rock
- Years active: 2002–2006
- Labels: Gravity DIP, Geffen, Sore Point
- Members: Arthur Shepherd; Adam Marino; Tom Capone; Joseph Grillo; Steve Sanderson; Ti Kreck

Instruction was an alternative rock band that formed in 2002 in Brooklyn, New York. The band consisted of lead vocalist Arthur Shepherd, bassist Adam Marino, lead guitarist Tom Capone and drummer Ti Kreck.

== Band history ==
Details of when the band originated are very obscure but they started to tour at the back end of 2002 with the official website stating the first date of their tour being December 19, 2002 at the Cavern in Exeter, England.

The band played a few gigs in Boston and back in their home city of Brooklyn before starting an extensive tour of the United Kingdom with the whole of 2003 being played in places such as Glasgow, Manchester, Norwich, Leicester, London and Middlesbrough. Nineteen of those dates were played with up and coming Welsh band Funeral for a Friend.

Instruction's original EP was released through Gravity DIP Records. This EP, paired with the loyal following their successful UK tour gave them, led to an appearance at the Download Festival in 2003. After a series of gigs after the Download Festival with Biffy Clyro and Hundred Reasons, the band was signed to Geffen Records for the release of their first major album, God Doesn't Care

Before the release of the new album the band recruited Joseph Grillo to the band on guitar/vocals from Garrison, a band that Instruction toured with during October 2003.

One of the songs from the hotly anticipated album, Breakdown was already gaining cult status and the video of the subsequent song topped the bill of Fuse TV's Ovenfresh show, beating off competition from the likes of New Found Glory, Beastie Boys and the Libertines.

The album was released in August 2004 to massive critical acclaim and Instruction were now well on the way to stardom. After breaking into the UK the band tried their luck in the US and played gigs in various American locales (Texas, Detroit, New Jersey, Ohio et al.) along with more established names in the rock business such as Puddle of Mudd, Papa Roach, Linkin Park, Korn & Helmet, and gained some airtime on Radio One in England

In 2005, however, the band's relationship with Geffen had turned sour leading the band to eventually announce a hiatus on 5, August 2005 after their final tour of the UK. They played their final show in Truro, England.

Shortly after the hiatus of Instruction a new band formed from the former members of Instruction called Fires was formed and was quickly renamed to God Fires Man with Arthur Shepherd, Joseph Grillo, John Wilkinson, Drew Thomas from Instruction, Garrison, Errortype:11 and Walking Concert forming the nucleus for the new band.

== Discography ==
=== Studio albums ===
==== God Doesn't Care (2004) ====
1. Great
2. Lean On You
3. Are You Happy?
4. I’m Dead
5. Breakdown
6. Pissed Me Off Again
7. Death To The Four Car Garage Band
8. Feed The Culture
9. Your Punk Sucks
10. Types To Exception
11. Three Stops Short Of Dagenham
12. God Doesn’t Care

=== Extended plays ===
==== Rise Up (EP) (2006) ====
1. Rise Up
2. Feed The Culture
3. Your Punk Sucks (live in LA)

==== The Great (EP) (2006) ====
1. Great
2. Pissed Me Off Again
3. Death To The Four Car Garage Band
4. Your Punk Sucks

=== Singles ===
Year	Song	US Main.	Album
2004	"Breakdown"	34	God Doesn't Care
2005	"I'm Dead"	—	God Doesn't Care
"—" denotes a release that did not chart.
