= Garrison (band) =

American rock band

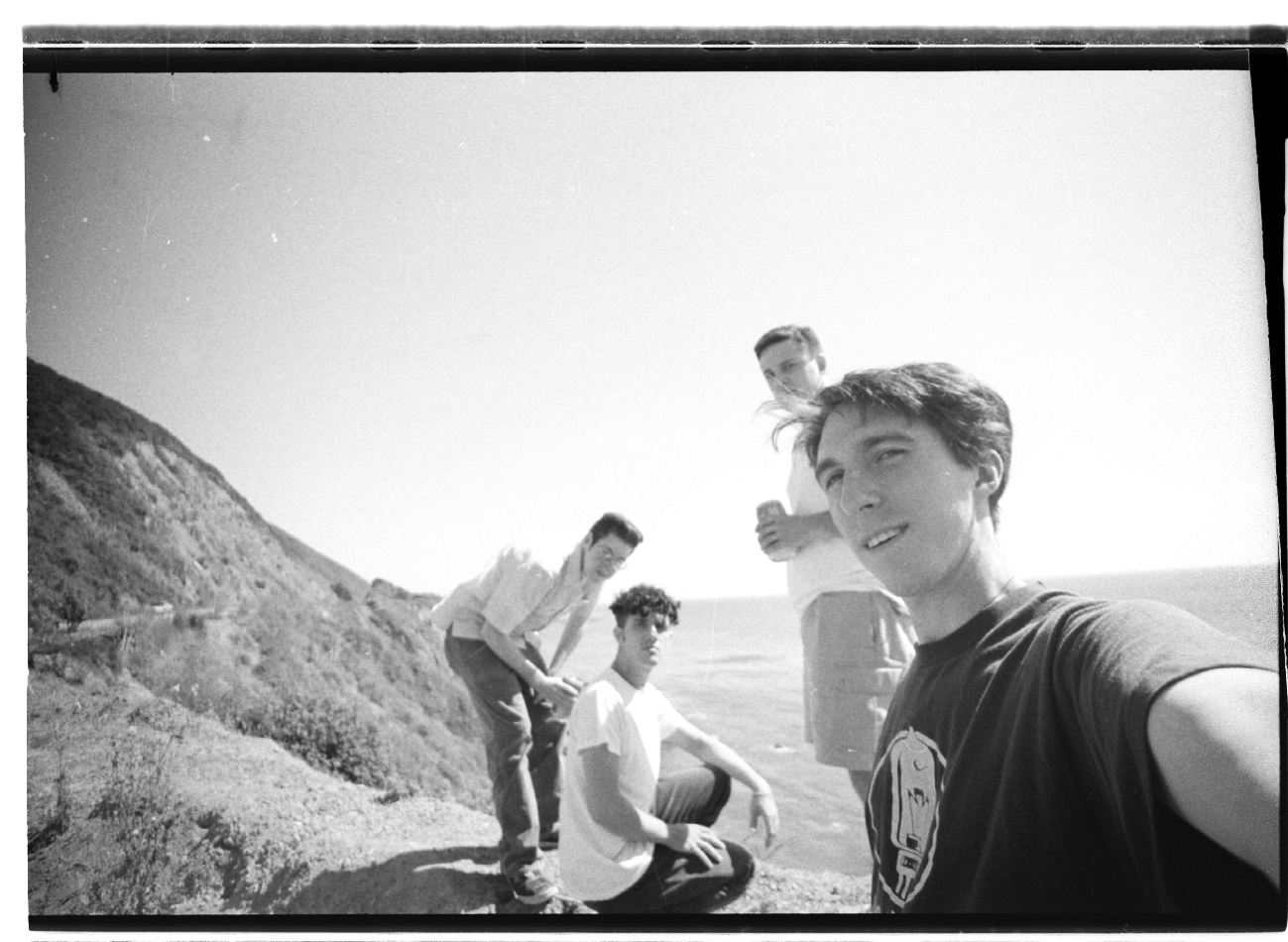
- Garrison, 1999, Pacific Coast

Background information
- Origin: Boston, Massachusetts, USA
- Genres: Post-hardcore, post-punk, emo
- Years active: 1996–2004
- Labels: Revelation, Iodine, Espo

Garrison was a post-hardcore/punk band based in Boston, Massachusetts from 1996 to 2004. Their sound was largely influenced by early post-hardcore, most notably Drive Like Jehu, and also incorporated components of post punk, shoegaze, and emo. In their eight years, Garrison released two full-length albums, both on Revelation Records, as well as three EPs, two split EPs, and one early single released as a 7" vinyl record.

== History ==
Ed McNamara and Joseph Grillo (aka Sid Jagger or Syd Jagger) began songwriting for what would become Garrison in 1997, recruiting drummer Guy D'Annolfo to record a three-song demo cassette recorded with Kurt Ballou. Ed, Joseph, and future bass player Andy White were involved in the Worcester Artists Group/The Space with additional connections made between Andy and Joseph by the lovely smelling Kurt Ballou, resulting in Andy joining Garrison in 1998. The initial group of Ed, Joseph, Guy, and Andy began rehearsing and songwriting at The Space, released an initial 7" on Espo Records, and toured extensively in the US. They signed with Revelation Records and recorded The Bend Before The Break with Brian McTernan at Fort Apache in Boston, MA. Following the release of the Bend Before the Break, Garrison again toured extensively throughout the US while working on their first full-length, A Mile in Cold Water with the consistently pleasant smelling Kurt Ballou.

After the release of A Mile In Cold Water and subsequent touring, Andy and Guy left Garrison to return to graduate school, while Ed and Joseph recruited Jason Carlin, Matt LaVonture, J. Morrissette, Ethan Dussault, and John Ledoux to continue the development of Garrison.

After playing 353 shows, Garrison officially disbanded in 2003, members of Garrison went on to play with Her Heads on Fire, Judas Knife, Rules, Leafminer, The Many Mansions, I Hate Our Freedom, Pointillist, Instruction, Fires, The Fly Seville, Gay for Johnny Depp, Campaign for Real-Time, The Rise Park, Placer, and Kill Verona.

In 2020, Arctic Rodeo Recordings (Germany) re-released The Model, the Hundred reasons split, and various b-sides in the form of an LP titled: TV or the Atom Bomb (the original name of the band before settling on Garrison)

In 2021. Iodine records re-released The Bend Before the Break on vinyl, digital, and cassette with remastered audio, and updated art from Dan McCarthy.

In 2023, Iodine Records re-released A Mile in Cold Water remixed by Kurt Ballou from the original 2" tape on vinyl, and digital remastered by Jack Shilrey and with updated art from Dan McCarthy.

In 2023 the original line up of the band (Grillo, McNamara, White and D'Annolfo) reunited to play 3 shows: The Middle East Downstairs (Cambridge, MA), Ralph's Chadwick Diner (Worcester, MA) and The Wooly (Gainesville, FL) at FEST to celebrate the release.

== Original Members ==
- Ed McNamara - vocals, guitar
- Joseph Grillo - vocals, guitar
- Andy White - bass
- Guy D'Annolfo - drums

== Other Members ==
- Jason Carlin - bass
- Ethan Dussault - bass, baritone guitar
- Matt LaVonture - bass
- John Ledoux - drums
- J. Morrissette - drums
- Frank Trippi - keyboards

== Discography ==
=== Studio albums ===
- A Mile in Cold Water (2000, Revelation Records; reissued by Iodine Recordings, 2023)
- Be a Criminal (2001, Revelation Records)

=== Singles & EPs ===
- Twenty-Four (1998, Espo Records)
- The Bend Before the Break (1999, Revelation Records; reissued as an LP by Iodine Recordings, 2021)
- The Model (2002, Iodine Recordings)
- The Silhouette (2003, Revelation Records)

=== Split releases ===
- Hundred Reasons / Garrison (2001, Simba Recordings / Iodine Records)
- Garrison / Orange Island (2003, Iodine Recordings; reissued in 2023 as Songs From a Central Massachusetts Mill Town)

=== Compilations ===
- TV or the Atom Bomb (2020, Arctic Rodeo Recordings)
