= Iodine Recordings =

- Founded: 1996
- Founder: Casey Horrigan
- Distributors: Deathwish Inc. (current), Revelation Records (former)
- Genre: Punk rock; pop punk; hardcore punk; melodic hardcore; post-hardcore; metalcore; alternative rock
- Country of origin: United States
- Location: Boston, Massachusetts
- Official website: iodinerecords.com

Iodine Recordings is an independent record label based in Boston, Massachusetts, United States. Iodine Recordings releases punk, hardcore, and indie rock music. It was once home to bands such as Brand New, Orange Island, Smoke or Fire (Jericho RVA), There Were Wires, Gregor Samsa, and more.

Iodine started as a record distribution company in 1996 formed by Casey Horrigan. Iodine later evolved into a record label with its first release in 2000, a compilation CD titled "Ghost in the Gears" featuring popular hardcore bands such as Converge, Cave In, Zegota, and Good Clean Fun. Reuben Bettsack (singer of The Nationale Blue) purchased half the label in 2001 becoming co-owner and vice president of the company. Iodine soon started signing local and national artists of all different genres, and developed into a well known label. Iodine also put on a very popular annual music festival in Boston called Iodine Fest which showcased many popular indie and hardcore acts. In 2003 Iodine had its biggest release year, a total of eight records. Facing financial hardships and lack of sales to support these new releases, Iodine had to announce its closing at the end of 2003.

Some Iodine bands moved on and had some great success. Brand New signed to Triple Crown Records/Interscope Records, Orange Island released two records on Triple Crown Records and Rise Records, Smoke or Fire signed to Fat Wreck Chords, Gregor Samsa has signed to Kora Records and has a new CD as well as a split LP with Red Sparowes on Robotic Empire, and There Were Wires went on to form new bands like Disappearer and Doomriders (Deathwish Inc.).

In late 2020, Iodine Recordings announced that it would be re-launching with new releases slated for 2021.

On February 3, 2023, Iodine Recordings announced a 30th Anniversary Edition of Quicksand's debut LP "Slip" being re-issued on vinyl. The 30th Anniversary Edition of "Slip" also included a 64-page hardcover book with band photographs, rare concert posters, and a foreword by Quicksand's Walter Schreifels. The book also contains commentary from notable musicians from the punk scene, including: Scott Ian of Anthrax, Geoff Rickly of Thursday, Stephen Brodsky of Cave In, Dennis Lyxzén of Refused, Tim McIlrath of Rise Against, and many more. The record was also remastered for vinyl using the original 1993 master tapes.

On April 15, 2025, Iodine Recordings announced a new imprint label, Samsara Records, solely dedicated of bringing defunct out-of-print records and decades of lost material.

== Label discography ==
As of September 2022, Iodine Recordings' discography includes over 50 releases from over 30 different bands. Its main discography most prominently features releases from Quicksand, Brand New, Smoke or Fire, Jeromes Dream, and Onelinedrawing.

In March 2021, Iodine Recordings uploaded its entire catalog onto the music streaming/purchasing service, Bandcamp.

== Artists ==
=== Current ===
- Audio Karate
- Best Ex
- Bloodhorse
- The Darling Fire
- Dead Bars
- Drowningman
- DROUGHT
- Further Seems Forever
- Gameface
- Her Head's On Fire
- Hey Thanks!
- Horsewhip
- Hundreds of AU
- Jeromes Dream
- Light Tower
- Love Letter
- Memory Entry
- Modern Life is War
- NØ MAN
- New Forms
- Onelinedrawing
- Orange Island
- Piebald
- Rebuilder
- Ritual Earth
- Smoke or Fire
- Stretch Arm Strong
- The Casket Lottery
- The Iron Roses
- The Saddest Landscape
- There Were Wires
- TEARDROPS
- Unsufferable
- Quiet Fear

=== Former ===
- Blue/Green Heart
- Brand New
- Garrison
- Nathan Gray
- Gregor Samsa
- Jericho RVA (Changed name to Smoke or Fire)
- Jonah Matranga
- Joe McMahon
- Quicksand
- Six Going On Seven

== The Rebirth of Iodine Recordings ==
After the closure of Iodine Recordings, Casey left the music scene to hike the Appalachian Trail and travel the world. In early 2021, Iodine Recordings came back after seventeen years of inactivity. Casey had reconnected with old friends and bands, and had the idea to revitalize the underground label. The catalyst being There Were Wires who wanted to see their album Somnambulists re-released on vinyl.

Since the rebirth of the label, they have put out albums from bands such as Smoke Or Fire, Audio Karate, Hey Thanks!, and Onelinedrawing. These include re-releases, compilations, and new albums.
