= Petitioning the Empty Sky =

Studio album / compilation album by Converge
- Released: 1996 (EP and CD); January 20, 1998 (reissue); March 22, 2005 (remaster)
- Recorded: 1995, 1997 (reissue bonus tracks)
- Studios: Salad Days, Boston, Massachusetts; West Sound, Londonderry, New Hampshire; The Outpost, Stoughton, Massachusetts
- Genres: Metalcore; hardcore punk
- Length: 14:19 (EP); 54:48 (CD) (Note: Runtime includes 5:04 of silence between "Homesong" and "Burn in Hell".); 42:58 (reissue); 47:00 (remaster)
- Labels: Ferret; Equal Vision
- Producers: Brian McTernan; Mike West

Converge chronology
Caring and Killing (1995)	Petitioning the Empty Sky (1996)	When Forever Comes Crashing (1998)

Alternative cover
- 2005 remaster artwork by Aaron Turner.

Petitioning the Empty Sky is the second studio album by American metalcore band Converge. However, contrary to many sources, the band considers this a compilation album, being a collection of songs recorded at different times. While tracklists differ between releases, this album features studio recorded tracks along with live recordings of three songs. Petitioning the Empty Sky was released and distributed through several different labels beginning in the mid 90s.

== Background and writing ==
The album's opening track “The Saddest Day” was written in guitarist Kurt Ballou's dorm room apartment at Boston University, which vocalist Jacob Bannon described as "this weird bathroom/bedroom thing". Here, Ballou showcased for Bannon some of the song's basic riff ideas he had composed. Bannon said they were just starting to get comfortable in being what they were, and they were just thinking about seven-inches and recording songs rather than thinking about making a full album.

When the band signed with Equal Vision, the label suggested compiling all of the band's previous EPs into a "collection record of sorts". Bannon called it "a little more straight-ahead than Halo in Haystack and Unloved and Weeded Out". He recalled their emotions being more streamlined with this album, as well as Ballou and himself getting "all these crazy things out". According to Bannon, the majority of the input being between the two of them led to the album being more focused.

Jacob Bannon recalled the late-night vocal tracking sessions for the album as the first time he had truly felt satisfied with what he had captured on audio recording.

== Musical style and composition ==
The music on Petitioning the Empty Sky is considered to be "darker", "more aggressive" and more "straight-on" than some of the band's previous albums.

Tracks nine through eleven - "For You", "Antithesis" and "Homesong" - were recorded live during a performance on radio station WJUL, run by college students at UMass Lowell. A notable moment on the live track "Homesong" is when a band member breaks a guitar string and pauses the song, and bleeding singer Jacob Bannon claims to have "hit my head on a mic stand" and that it will "make us look punk." The original CD release on Ferret Music features "Homesong" as a hidden/untitled song following "Antithesis".

== Release ==
Petitioning the Empty Sky was originally released through Ferret Music in 1996 and was also one of the earliest albums released through the newly formed label. This early version was a 7-inch EP featuring only the first four tracks of the eventual full-length. Later that same year, the record was re-released with four new tracks added to it. Initial CD copies had an unlisted cover of Twisted Sister's "Burn in Hell", but the master for that track was lost and has not appeared in any reissues.

Studio recordings of the live tracks "For You" and "Homesong" were originally released on the Unloved and Weeded Out 7-inch EP in 1995. The full length compilation version of Unloved and Weeded Out was later released in 2002 through Deathwish and also featured these two songs. The studio recording of "Antithesis" could originally be found on Converge's debut album Halo in a Haystack in 1994, and later on the compilation album Caring and Killing released in 1997. The song "Dead" was rerecorded from the version on Caring and Killing, which was recorded in 1994/1995. The original version of "Love As Arson" was released on When Forever Comes Crashing in 1998.

== Reissues and remasters ==
In 1998, the album was reissued through Converge's new label Equal Vision Records as EVR040 on January 20, 1998. The full length reissue contained three live tracks ("For You," "Homesong," and "Antithesis") recorded during a radio broadcast, three newly recorded tracks ("Buried But Breathing," "Farewell Note to This City," and "Color Me Blood Red") and one track ("Shingles") that was recorded along with the original four tracks, but were unreleased.

Shortly after the release of Converge's 2004 album You Fail Me through Epitaph Records, Equal Vision reissued remasters of Petitioning the Empty Sky and When Forever Comes Crashing. The updated version of Petitioning the Empty Sky featured new artwork from Isis frontman Aaron Turner, production work from Converge's Kurt Ballou in addition to Mike Poorman and Alan Douches, and an alternate version of "Love As Arson" as a bonus track. The liner notes also contain the first half of an essay written by the "Aggressive Tendencies" columnist and editor of the Canadian online magazine Exclaim!, Chris Gramlich. The second part of the essay is continued in When Forever Comes Crashing. The remaster was Equal Vision's EVR109 released on March 22, 2005.

In 2006, Jacob Bannon's Deathwish Inc. released a vinyl box set collection for the remasters of Petitioning the Empty Sky and When Forever Comes Crashing in a package dubbed Petitioning Forever. Due to the physical limitations of a vinyl LP, a single 12-inch record cannot hold all of the songs from the remaster. The three live tracks were released separately with the first pressing on a 7-inch vinyl with its own artwork based on box set packaging. The box set was Deathwish's DWI47, and the separate vinyl was cataloged as DWLIMITED04.

== Reception ==
Professional ratings
Review scores
Source	Rating
Allmusic	4.5/5 stars
AntiMusic.com	5/5 stars
The Encyclopedia of Popular Music	3/5 stars
LambGoat	(9/10)
Prefix	(9/10)

Allmusic critic Blake Butler wrote: "Converge can break multiple bones throughout the body with sound alone, assaulting with beautiful metal riffs, throat-ripping screams, and aggressive smashing percussion."

The album's opening track "The Saddest Day" is considered one of the band's most popular and revered songs. Frank Turner of Loudersound said, "You can hear an entire genre being torn apart in the first 30 seconds [...] in a way, hardcore as a genre can be defined as before and after this song."

Graham Hartmann of Revolver wrote that "Converge truly became Converge on Petitioning the Empty Sky." He praised the album, particularly "The Saddest Day", for mixing hardcore and extreme metal "with an ingenious, progressive, chaotic twist."

== Track listings ==
All lyrics are written by Jacob Bannon; all music is composed by Converge.

Ferret Music 7-inch EP (1996)
No.	Title	Length
1.	"The Saddest Day"	7:05
2.	"Albatross"	1:49
3.	"Dead"	3:05
4.	"Forsaken"	2:20

Ferret Music CD (1996)
No.	Title	Length
1.	"The Saddest Day"	7:05
2.	"Forsaken"	2:20
3.	"Albatross"	1:49
4.	"Dead"	3:05
5.	"Shingles"	4:13
6.	"Buried But Breathing"	1:11
7.	"Farewell Note to This City"	5:20
8.	"Color Me Blood Red"	3:57
9.	"For You" / "Antithesis" (live)	8:23
10.	"Homesong" (live) ("Homesong" ends at 6:52; after five minutes of silence, begins an unlisted cover of Twisted Sister's "Burn in Hell")	17:06

Equal Vision Records reissue CD/LP (1998)
No.	Title	Length
1.	"The Saddest Day"	7:05
2.	"Forsaken"	2:20
3.	"Albatross"	1:49
4.	"Dead"	3:05
5.	"Shingles"	4:13
6.	"Buried But Breathing"	1:11
7.	"Farewell Note to This City"	5:20
8.	"Color Me Blood Red"	3:57
9.	"For You" / "Antithesis" (live)	8:23
10.	"Homesong" (live)	6:51

Equal Vision Records remaster CD (2005)
No.	Title	Length
1.	"The Saddest Day"	7:05
2.	"Forsaken"	2:20
3.	"Albatross"	1:49
4.	"Dead"	3:05
5.	"Shingles"	4:13
6.	"Buried But Breathing"	1:11
7.	"Farewell Note to This City"	5:20
8.	"Color Me Blood Red"	3:57
9.	"For You" (live)	2:44
10.	"Antithesis" (live)	5:39
11.	"Homesong" (live)	7:06
12.	"Love As Arson" (alternate version)	3:02

Deathwish Inc. Petitioning Forever LP set (2006)
No.	Title	Vinyl side	Length
1.	"The Saddest Day"	Side A	7:05
2.	"Forsaken"	Side A	2:20
3.	"Albatross"	Side A	1:49
4.	"Dead"	Side A	3:05
5.	"Shingles"	Side A	4:13
6.	"Buried But Breathing"	Side B	1:11
7.	"Farewell Note to This City"	Side B	5:20
8.	"Color Me Blood Red"	Side B	3:57
9.	"Love As Arson" (alternate version)	Side B	3:02
10.	"For You" (live)	Side E	2:44
11.	"Antithesis" (live)	Side E	5:39
12.	"Homesong" (live)	Side F	7:06

== Personnel ==
Converge

- Jacob Bannon – vocals
- Kurt Ballou – guitar, backing vocals, bass guitar (track 1)
- Aaron Dalbec – guitar (tracks 2, 3, 5, 7, 9–11)
- Jeff Feinburg – bass guitar
- Stephen Brodsky – bass guitar (track 12)
- Damon Bellorado – drums

Original production

- Brian McTernan – producer, engineer, mixing
- Mike West – engineer

Original artwork and design

- Jacob Bannon – artwork, design
- Mark Lickosky – photography, video stills
- Patrick Santini – photography
- Aaron Turner – artwork, paintings
- Erik Zimmerman – photography

Recording history

- Tracks 1–5 recorded by Brian McTernan at Salad Days studio in October 1995
- Tracks 6–8 recorded by Mike West at West Sound in February 1996
- Tracks 9–11 recorded live on the air at WJUL in August 1995
- Track 12 recorded by Jim Siegel at The Outpost in May 1997

Remaster production (tracks 1–8, 12)

- Kurt Ballou – mixing at GodCity Studios in July 2004
- Mike Poorman – assistant mix engineering
- Alan Douches – mastering at West West Side Music

Remaster artwork and design

- Jacob Bannon – design
- Chris Boart – photography
- Danielle Dombrowski – photography
- High Roller Studios – enhanced video
- Nataija Kent – photography
- Mark Lickosky – video still
- Aaron Turner – artwork
