= WYW =

Studio album by Wear Your Wounds
- Released: April 7, 2017
- Genre: Post-rock
- Length: 63:16
- Label: Deathwish

Wear Your Wounds chronology
WYW (2017)	Dunedevil (2017)

Singles from WYW
- 1. "Goodbye Old Friend" Released: January 13, 2017

WYW is the debut studio album released by Jacob Bannon. It was released on April 7, 2017 through Deathwish Inc. WYW has multiple guest musicians such as Kurt Ballou, Mike McKenzie, Chris Maggio, and Sean Martin.

== Background ==
After Supermachiner released Rise of the Great Machine and after Converge had completed recording Jane Doe, Bannon started writing and recording solo material. A number of releases were lined up; however, none of them saw the light of day.

The album was originally planned to be a double album titled Wear Your Wounds released by Icarus Records, an imprint label of Bannon's label Deathwish. In January 2005, Bannon's solo recordings were said to have been in the editing and mixing process, and it was believed there would be multiple releases which would include the Wear Your Wounds double album throughout the year; however, this did not happen.

Initially planning since 2008 on releasing solo music under his name only, in 2012 Bannon began using the Wear Your Wounds name for these projects. This allowed others to collaborate and work with Bannon on future projects.

As early as January 21, 2014, Bannon had been in the studio tracking and mixing material for the album. The album has multiple guest musicians such as Kurt Ballou (Converge), Mike McKenzie (The Red Chord, Stomach Earth, Unraveller), Chris Maggio (Sleigh Bells, Trap Them, Coliseum), and Sean Martin (Hatebreed, Cage, Kid Cudi, Twitching Tongues).

On January 13, 2017, Bannon announced a release date of April 7, 2017 for the album. Along with the announcement, the single "Goodbye Old Friend" was released.

On February 7, 2017, the music video for "Wear Your Wounds" was released, was directed by Max Moore. Bannon said: "The song is about the psychological effects of negative experiences, and ultimately not allowing them to define who are and wish to be [...] I feel that most people can likely relate to that message in some way. The video is a recreation of the album cover and other visuals in the album. The character creates a ladder to ascend to the sky. Looking for answers, hoping for a metaphorical confrontation in some way. The character also wears a mirror, being a literal reflection of the world that surrounds."

== Track listing ==
1. "Wear Your Wounds" – 3:48
2. "Giving Up" – 5:01
3. "Iron Rose" – 8:13
4. "Hard Road to Heaven" – 4:36
5. "Best Cry of Your Life" – 4:26
6. "Breaking Point" – 7:52
7. "Shine" – 6:03
8. "Fog" – 7:31
9. "Heavy Blood" – 6:26
10. "Goodbye Old Friend" – 9:17

== Personnel ==
Adapted from Bandcamp.

- Jacob Bannon
- Kurt Ballou
- Mike McKenzie
- Chris Maggio
- Sean Martin
