= Caring and Killing =

Compilation album by Converge
- Released: 1995 (original); November 17, 1997 (reissue)
- Recorded: 1991–1994
- Studio: Salad Days (Boston, Massachusetts); West Sound (Londonderry, New Hampshire)
- Genre: Metalcore; hardcore punk
- Length: 60:57
- Label: Lost & Found; Hydra Head (HH666-07)
- Producer: Brian McTernan; Converge

Converge chronology
Halo in a Haystack (1994)	Caring and Killing (1995)	Petitioning the Empty Sky (1996)

Alternative cover
- 2013 vinyl remaster artwork by Aaron Turner.

Professional ratings
Review scores
Source	Rating
Allmusic	4.5/5 stars
The Encyclopedia of Popular Music	4/5 stars
Sputnikmusic	3/5 stars

Caring and Killing: 1991 Through 1994 is a compilation album by American metalcore band Converge, originally released in 1995 through Lost & Found Records and re-released on November 17, 1997, through Hydra Head Records.

== Release ==
The album was originally released as a European exclusive through Lost & Found Records. However, Converge became dissatisfied with the way the label was handling the release and over charging fans for their hard to find older songs. Caring and Killing was re-released through Hydra Head Records on November 17, 1997, in America to "make an overpriced release obsolete." The album was the seventh release through Hydra Head, founded by Aaron Turner of Isis in 1993.

In 2013, Hydra Head Records reissued Caring and Killing. The album was released exclusively on vinyl, featured updated artwork by Jacob Bannon and Aaron Turner and was remastered by Alan Douches.

== Song history ==
Caring and Killing features most of Converge's debut album Halo in a Haystack in addition to songs released on various compilations, demos and previously unreleased tracks.

The final track, "But Life Goes On", was recorded for Converge's debut 7" but was never released.

A rerecorded version of "Dead" and a live version of "Antithesis" were released on the band's second album Petitioning the Empty Sky.

Though the album packaging and liner notes suggest the album contains sixteen tracks, only fifteen tracks are present. The opening instrumental song "Shallow Breathing" from Halo in a Haystack was combined with "I Abstain" to create the first track.

Converge's split album with Hellchild, Deeper the Wound, featured a live recording of "Shallow Breathing".

== Track listing ==
All tracks are written by Converge.

No.	Title	Original release (Year) (Note: The 1997 Hydra Head version of Caring and Killing makes a few errors with identifying the original releases of a few songs. The liner notes erroneously labeled "Sky" as a part of Halo in a Haystack and "Down" was erroneously labeled as a Soundtrack of the Revolution contribution. The 2013 remaster's liner notes correctly identify the origin of these songs and is the source used for the track listing shown in this article.)	Length
1.	"Shallow Breathing (Note: On some versions of Caring and Killing, the instrumental lead song "Shallow Breathing" was (purposefully or not) mixed with the following song "I Abstain" to create a single track. As such, some digital versions of the album list track 1 as "Shallow Breathing/I Abstain" and consequently also only feature 15 tracks total.)"	Halo in a Haystack (1994)	2:03
2.	"I Abstain"	Halo in a Haystack (1994)	3:16
3.	"Two Day Romance"	Halo in a Haystack (1994)	3:38
4.	"Fact Leaves Its Ghost"	Halo in a Haystack (1994)	2:32
5.	"Becoming a Stranger"	Halo in a Haystack (1994)	4:09
6.	"Antithesis"	Halo in a Haystack (1994)	5:28
7.	"Dead"	Previously unreleased (1994)	3:00
8.	"Tied to My Neck"	Previously unreleased (1994)	3:36
9.	"Divinity"	Previously unreleased (1994)	4:25
10.	"Blind"	Previously unreleased (1994)	3:25
11.	"Sky"	Soundtrack of the Revolution split EP (1993)	3:41
12.	"Down"	Dog Days (1993) / Halo in a Haystack (1994)	5:02
13.	"Zodiac"	Boston Is Burning split EP (1993)	3:54
14.	"Yesterday"	Where Have All the Flowers Gone? demo (1992)	4:51
15.	"Savior Salvation"	Where Have All the Flowers Gone? demo (1992); Don't Be Afraid compilation (1992)	3:28
16.	"But Life Goes On"	Previously unreleased (1991)	4:28
Total length:			60:57

== Personnel ==
Album personnel as listed in CD liner notes.

Converge

- Jacob Bannon – vocals
- Kurt Ballou – guitar
- Aaron Dalbec – guitar (tracks 1–13)
- Jeff Feinburg – bass guitar
- Damon Bellorado – drums

Session musicians

- Erik Ralston – bass guitar on tracks 1–6, 11–13 (Note: Halo in a Haystack's liner notes credit Ralson as the bassist on the tracks "Down" and "Exhale". While the 1997 version of Caring and Killing's liner notes credits Ralston as the bassist on the Halo in a Haystack tracks "I Abstain", "Antithesis" and "Down" and the 2013 version of Caring and Killing's liner notes credit both Feinburg and Ralston as the bassist on all the Halo in a Haystack tracks. Further note that "Exhale" and "Undo" form Halo in a Haystack are absent from Caring and Killing making it unknown who provided bass guitar on those tracks through the liner notes of this album.)

Guests

- Skott Wade – backing vocals on track 6

Original production and recording

- Tracks 1–6, 11–13 recorded at West Sound in August 1993 & 1994; engineered by Mike West, produced by Converge (Note: Halo in a Haystack's liner notes state the album was recorded in April 1994. While the 1997 and 2013 versions of Caring and Killing state that the record was recorded in August 1993 & 1994.)
- Tracks 7–10 recorded at Salad Days One in winter 1994/1995; engineered and produced by Brian "Fury" McTernan
- Tracks 14–15 recorded at West Sound in winter 1991/1992
- Track 16 recorded at West Sound in June 1991

Album art (1997)

- Jacob Bannon – design
- Mark Lickosky – still photography
- Cardone – live photography
- Erik Zimmerman – live photography
- Tim Mailloux – live photography

Remaster personnel (2013)

- Alan Douches – remastering all songs at West West Side
- Aaron Turner – artwork
- Jacob Bannon – design
