= Unloved and Weeded Out =

Compilation album by Converge
- Released: January 28, 2003
- Recorded: 1994 – December 2001
- Studio: The Outpost, Stoughton, Massachusetts; Salad Days, Boston, Massachusetts; West Sound, Londonderry, New Hampshire; GodCity, Salem, Massachusetts
- Genre: Metalcore; hardcore punk
- Length: 44:07
- Label: Deathwish (DWI15)
- Producer: Kurt Ballou; Chris Chin; Brian McTernan; Jim Seigel; Mike West

Converge chronology
Jane Doe (2001)	Unloved and Weeded Out (2003)	You Fail Me (2004)

Professional ratings
Review scores
Source	Rating
AllMusic	3/5 stars
Exclaim!	(positive)
Punknews.org	4/5 stars

Unloved and Weeded Out is a compilation by American metalcore band Converge, released on January 28, 2003, through Deathwish Inc.

Unloved and Weeded Out features 14 tracks, some of which were previously released rarities while others were previously unreleased. Among other tracks, the album features five demo tracks that were recorded in guitarist Kurt Ballou's parents' basement before signing to Equal Vision Records and studio versions were released on When Forever Comes Crashing, the three tracks that originally made up the 1995 Unloved and Weeded Out EP and one track from Converge's out-of-print debut album Halo in a Haystack.

== Track listing ==
All lyrics are written by Jacob Bannon; all music is composed by Converge

No.	Title	Original release (Year recorded)	Length
1.	"Downpour"	"Downpour / Serial Killer" (1997)	2:40
2.	"Flowers and Razorwire"	They Came from Massachusetts compilation (1995)	5:03
3.	"Tremor"	Previously unreleased (1995)	1:02
4.	"Home Song"	Unloved and Weeded Out (1995)	5:58
5.	"For You"	Unloved and Weeded Out (1995)	2:38
6.	"Jacob's Ladder"	Unloved and Weeded Out (1995)	3:59
7.	"Undo"	Halo in a Haystack (1994)	2:19
8.	"Towing Jehovah" (demo)	previously unreleased (1997); studio version on When Forever Comes Crashing	2:11
9.	"The High Cost of Playing God" (demo)	previously unreleased (1997); studio version on When Forever Comes Crashing	5:06
10.	"When Forever Comes Crashing" (demo)	previously unreleased (1997); studio version on When Forever Comes Crashing	3:06
11.	"Year of the Swine" (demo)	previously unreleased (1997); studio version on When Forever Comes Crashing	3:38
12.	"Letterbomb" (demo)	previously unreleased (1997); studio version on When Forever Comes Crashing	3:02
13.	"Locust Reign" (live in California)	previously unreleased (2001); studio version on The Poacher Diaries	1:39
14.	"This Is Mine" (live in California)	previously unreleased (2001); studio version on The Poacher Diaries	1:44

== Personnel ==
Unloved and Weeded Out personnel adapted from CD liner notes.

=== Music ===
- Jacob Bannon – vocals, lyrics
- Kurt Ballou – guitars, bass on tracks 3–6
- Nate Newton – bass
- Ben Koller – drums
- Aaron Dalbec – second guitar on tracks 2, 4–7
- Jeff Feinberg – bass on tracks 2, 7
- Stephen Brodsky – bass on tracks 1, 8–12
- Damon Bellorado – drums on tracks 1–12
- "Biggie" – additional vocals on track 13
- Tre McCarthy – backing vocals on track 1
- Matt Pike – backing vocals on track 1

=== Production and recording ===
- Jim Seigel – recorded track 1 at The Outpost in May 1997
- Brian McTernan – recorded track 2 at Salad Days in late 1995, recorded tracks 3–6 in March 1995
- Mike West – recorded track 7 at West Sound in 1994
- Chris Chin – recorded tracks 13 & 14 live at Chain Reaction in December 2001
- Kurt Ballou – recorded tracks 8–12 at his parents' basement in June 1997, mixed tracks 8–12 at GodCity in spring 1998, mixed tracks 1–7 at GodCity in March 2002, mixed tracks 13 & 14 at GodCity in May 2002
