= Dune Shacks of Peaked Hill Bars Historic District =

Historic district in Massachusetts, United States

- U.S. National Register of Historic Places
- U.S. Historic district
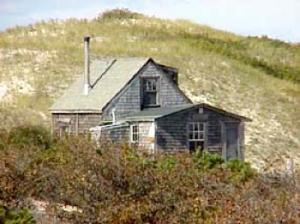
- A dune shack in Peaked Hill Bars Historic District

- Location within Cape Cod
- Location: Cape Cod National Seashore
- Nearest city: Provincetown, Massachusetts
- Coordinates: 42°4′23.62″N 70°10′38.140″W
- Area: 1,950 acres (790 ha)
- Built: 1920–1960
- NRHP reference No.: 12000132
- Added to NRHP: March 15, 2012

The Dune Shacks of Peaked Hill Bars Historic District is an artist colony and historic district located inside the Cape Cod National Seashore of Massachusetts, United States, nearest to the towns of Provincetown and Truro. The district covers 1,950 acres of land and centers on 19 extant dwellings that have been occupied by American artists and writers from the early 1920s to the present day. It was listed on the National Register of Historic Places in 2012. The name is derived from a Life-Saving Station known as Peaked Hill Bars that was established in 1882 on the lower cape.

== History of the Dune Shacks ==
The Wampanoag people inhabited and used all of the lands within the national seashore, including the dunes area, prior to European settlement in the 1600s.

The Massachusetts Humane Society built some of the earliest extant structures in the dunes area in 1872 to house members of the United States Life-Saving Service, whose mission was to assist survivors of shipwrecks. The dune shacks are mentioned by Henry David Thoreau in his book "Cape Cod" published in 1865.

During the 1920s, the current shacks were beginning to be built, reputedly using the flotsam of washed up shipwrecks. These shacks were appealing to the many artists and writers who had begun to be attracted to the artist's colony in Provincetown; they would live in the spartan solitude of the shacks writing or painting. "Probably the most famous of these was playwright Eugene O'Neill, who purchased one and spent many summers there with his second wife, Agnes Boulton. O'Neill penned Anna Christie (1920) and The Hairy Ape (1921) while living in his shack, and in doing so gave the whole collection of dune shacks something of an arty cachet."

Other artists and writers lived in the primitive dune shacks, including Harry Kemp who proclaimed himself "the Poet of the Dunes," Jack Kerouac, E. E. Cummings, Norman Mailer, and Jackson Pollock. In 2016, musician and artist Jacob Bannon stayed in one of the dune shacks for seven days painting and recording music, culminating in the release of a book and album both under the name Dunedevil. The shacks have never had electricity, plumbing, or running water.

Writers who wrote about the dune shacks, besides Thoreau, included Henry Beston, whose The Outermost House chronicles a season spent living in the dune shacks, and Hazel Hawthorne-Werner, who wrote Salt House about her year in the dunes in 1929. *** The Outermost House is in Eastham, near the Lifeguard Station, Cape Cod National Seashore. ('He looked out onto the o p e n Atlantic Ocean.')

Today, there are 19 dune shacks in the historic district, 18 of which are owned by the National Park Service. The dune shacks are accessible through private tours or hiking trails maintained by the National Seashore.

== Residency program ==
Seven of the shacks continue to be used as artists' housing through privately managed residency programs, such as the Provincetown Community Compact and the Peaked Hill Trust. Private individuals are able to enter a lottery for an opportunity to reside for a period of time in the shacks.

== Dune environment ==
Besides the dune shacks, the vast majority of the historic district is undeveloped dune landscape. One of the purposes of the historic district is preservation of the unspoiled dune landscape that has provided so many artists with inspiration. A plethora of cranberry bogs exist where the natural aquifer comes up through low-lying dunes.

== Origin of the name ==
Peaked Hill Bars refers to one of the nine United States Life-Saving Service stations established on Cape Cod in 1882. Peaked Hill Bars was later a United States Coast Guard station that was discontinued in 1938. In deciding where to erect the station at Peaked Hill Bars, it was said at the time that, "[a] more bleak or dangerous stretch of coast can hardly be found in the United States than at this station. The coast near the station rightly bears the name ‘ocean graveyard.’ Sunken rips stretch far out under the sea at this place, ever ready to grasp the keels of the ships that sail down upon them, and many appalling disasters have taken place here. There are two lines of bars that lie submerged off the shore ... these bars are ever shifting."

== See also ==
- National Register of Historic Places listings in Barnstable County, Massachusetts
- National Register of Historic Places listings in Cape Cod National Seashore
