= Dunedevil =

- Digital cover art image. The physical vinyl's front cover has a die cut circular hole for the record label to show through.

Studio album by Wear Your Wounds
- Released: May 19, 2017
- Recorded: Winter 2016
- Studios: C-Scape Dune Shack (Provincetown, MA)
- Genres: Ambient; Electronic
- Length: 29:25
- Label: Self-released (WYW002)
- Producer: Jacob Bannon

Wear Your Wounds chronology
WYW (2017)	Dunedevil (2017)	Rust on the Gates of Heaven (2019)

Dunedevil is a mixed-media project by Converge's frontman Jacob Bannon. The musical component of the project serves as Bannon's second album under the Wear Your Wounds moniker, while the physical mediums were compiled into a companion art book titled Dunedevil: An Artistic Journey Into Abstraction and Isolation. Both pieces were created during a seven-day excursion to Dune Shacks of Peaked Hill Bars Historic District and self-released on May 19, 2017—only one month after Wear Your Wounds' debut album, WYW.

== Background and creation ==
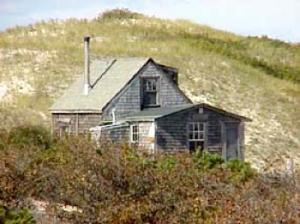
One of the many Dune Shacks of Peaked Hill Bars Historic District in Massachusetts. Jacob Bannon spent a week creating music and art in a shack much like this one.

After nearly 30 years of creating music for Converge, Supermachiner and Irons, in addition to creating artwork not limited to album covers for dozens of bands, Jacob Bannon had an epiphany. "I've had a lot of things going on in my life in the past couple of years that have made me realize that time is not infinite. The songs that you create, the art that you create, needs to go to the public if that is the intention." Over his career, Bannon created music that was never publicly released, but started to change his mind about these methods. "When I kept writing songs and filing them away and not sharing them with people, that was doing me a disservice creatively, so I'm now at a point in my life where I just want to get it out to people."

For one week during winter 2016, Bannon rented out one of the Dune Shacks of Peaked Hill Bars Historic District located outside of Provincetown, Massachusetts (Bannon's home state), a part of the Cape Cod National Seashore. Specifically, he stayed in the C-Scape Dune Shack (formerly known as the Cohen Shack). Scattered throughout the National Park, these shacks were originally built by the United States Life-Saving Service in the 1920s for shipwrecked sailors to seek refuge. Some were made from pieces of debris that has washed ashore, and none have been modernized with running water or electricity. Over the last century, many famous artists have spent time in the Dune Shacks for creative inspiration, including: playwright Eugene O'Neill (A Streetcar Named Desire, Death of a Salesman), poet and abolitionist Henry David Thoreau (Walden, Civil Disobedience), abstract expressionist painter Jackson Pollock (Mural on Indian Red Ground, No. 5, 1948) and iconoclast novelist Jack Kerouac (The Town and the City, Big Sur).

During each one of the seven days Bannon spent at C-Scape Dune Shack, he wrote and recorded a piano-driven track through a portable and solar-powered setup. After he returned home, The Red Chord's Mike McKenzie recorded additional guitars for the final track, "Be Still My Heart". The musical pieces he recorded during the seven-day excursion were compiled into the Dunedevil album, while the visual pieces (journal entries, paintings and photographs) were compiled into the nearly 300-page Dunedevil book. Commenting on the spontaneity of the project, Bannon said: "I didn't go out there with the intention to make a book, I went there with the intention to make stuff, but I like what I did so I'm going to share it with people."

== Track listing ==
1. "Invitation" – 4:55
2. "Great White" – 4:48
3. "Insects" – 2:51
4. "Outsiders" – 2:26
5. "Relic" – 5:07
6. "Steps" – 4:48
7. "Be Still My Heart" – 4:30

== Personnel ==
Dunedevil album personnel adapted from LP liner notes.

- Jacob Bannon – guitar, vocals, electronics, recording and artwork
- Mike McKenzie (The Red Chord) – additional guitar on "Be Still My Heart"
- Brad Boatright – mastering

== Dunedevil book ==
Dunedevil: An Artistic Journey Into Abstraction and Isolation
- Author: Jacob Bannon
- Illustrator: Jacob Bannon
- Cover artist: Jacob Bannon
- Language: English
- Publication date: May 19, 2017
- Publication place: United States
- Pages: 300
- ISBN: 978-0-692-79191-2

Dunedevil: An Artistic Journey Into Abstraction and Isolation is an art book and journal by Jacob Bannon. Created during the same week-long excursion as the Dunedevil album, the nearly 300-page book largely features Bannon's abstract paintings (including that piece that eventually became the cover art for both the book and album), but also includes brief daily diary entries and photography. The diary entries detail his daily activities, which also helps to illustrate the context behind the album's track titles. In an excerpt from "Day 2" he wrote: "I crawled into bed and read news of a great white shark seen just four feet from the beach today. Likely it was preying on the seals that have been keeping me company."

The book primarily features the work of Bannon, but also includes a foreword written by tattoo artist Thomas Hooper and additional photography by Reid Haithcock and his wife Janelle Bannon.
