= When Forever Comes Crashing =

Studio album by Converge
- Released: April 14, 1998 (original); March 22, 2005 (remaster)
- Recorded: December 22, 1997 – January 3, 1998
- Studio: God City (Salem, Mass.)
- Genre: Metalcore; hardcore punk
- Length: 39:28
- Label: Equal Vision
- Producer: Steve Austin; Converge

Converge chronology
Petitioning the Empty Sky (1996)	When Forever Comes Crashing (1998)	The Poacher Diaries (1999)

Alternative cover
- 2005 remaster artwork by Aaron Turner.

Professional ratings
Review scores
Source	Rating
Allmusic	4.5/5 stars
The Encyclopedia of Popular Music	3/5 stars
Punknews.org	link
Sputnikmusic	link
Terrorizer	4.5/5 stars

When Forever Comes Crashing is the third studio album by American metalcore band Converge, on April 14, 1998, through Equal Vision Records.

== Background and recording ==
The album was recorded at God City Studio from 22 December through 3 January 1998. Steve Austin of Today Is the Day, along with Converge, produced the album and also provided backup vocals on the track "The Lowest Common Denominator". Jay Randall, from Agoraphobic Nosebleed, Jeff Fineburg, Ben Cummings, Matt Pike (not to be confused with Matt Pike of Sleep and High on Fire fame), Grail Mortillaro, Ryan Parker and Tre McCarthy also appear as backing vocalists.

== Release ==
When Forever Comes Crashing was originally released on April 14, 1998, through Equal Vision Records.

Shortly after the release of Converge's 2004 album You Fail Me through Epitaph Records, Equal Vision reissued remasters of Petitioning the Empty Sky and When Forever Comes Crashing. The updated version of When Forever Comes Crashing featured new artwork from Isis frontman Aaron Turner, production work from Converge's Kurt Ballou in addition to Mike Poorman and Alan Douches, and a demo version of "Bitter and Then Some" as a bonus track. The liner notes also contain the second part of the essay written by the "Aggressive Tendencies" columnist and editor of the Canadian online magazine Exclaim!, Chris Gramlich. The first part of the essay is found on the Petitioning the Empty Sky remaster.

In 2006, Jacob Bannon's Deathwish Inc. released a vinyl box set collection for the remasters of Petitioning the Empty Sky and When Forever Comes Crashing in a package dubbed Petitioning Forever.

== Track listing ==
No.	Title	Length
1.	"My Unsaid Everything"	3:23
2.	"The High Cost of Playing God"	4:17
3.	"In Harm's Way"	4:20
4.	"Conduit"	4:10
5.	"The Lowest Common Denominator"	3:53
6.	"Towing Jehovah"	2:20
7.	"When Forever Comes Crashing"	3:14
8.	"Ten Cents"	2:20
9.	"Year of the Swine"	3:47
10.	"Letterbomb"	3:47
11.	"Love as Arson"	3:22
Total length:		39:28

Equal Vision Records remaster CD (2005)
No.	Title	Length
12.	"Bitter and Then Some (Demo Version)"	1:27
Total length:		40:55

== Personnel ==
Converge

- Jacob Bannon – vocals
- Kurt Ballou – guitar, vocals
- Aaron Dalbec – guitar
- Steve Brodsky – bass guitar, guitar (track 8)
- Damon Bellorado – drum kit

Additional musicians

- Travis Shettel – cymbal on "Letterbomb"

Production and recording history

- Steve Austin – mixing, engineer, producer
- Kurt Ballou – mixing, engineer, electronics
- Jacob Bannon – mixing
- Dean Baltulonis – digital editing
Guest musicians
- Ben Cummings (Bane) – backing vocals
- Grail Mortillaro – backing vocals
- Jay Randall (Agoraphobic Nosebleed) – backing vocals
- Jeff Feinburg – backing vocals
- Matt Pike – backing vocals
- Ryan Parker – backing vocals
- Tre McCarthy – backing vocals

Artwork and design

- Jacob Bannon – design
- Grail Mortillaro – photography
