= Umbra Vitae =

American death metal supergroup

- Origin: Boston, Massachusetts, U.S.
- Genre: Death metal
- Years active: 2020–present
- Label: Deathwish Inc.
- Spinoff of: Wear Your Wounds
- Members: Jacob Bannon; Mike McKenzie; Sean Martin; Greg Weeks; Jon Rice
- Website: www.umbravitae.com

Umbra Vitae is an American death metal supergroup formed in 2020. The band features vocalist Jacob Bannon (Converge), guitarists Mike McKenzie (The Red Chord) and Sean Martin (Twitching Tongues, Hatebreed), bassist Greg Weeks (The Red Chord) and drummer Jon Rice (Uncle Acid & the Deadbeats, Job for a Cowboy). The band's debut album, Shadow of Life, was released in 2020.

== History ==
Umbra Vitae was formed by Jacob Bannon, Mike McKenzie, and Sean Martin during rehearsal sessions for Bannon's solo project, Wear Your Wounds. During the album cycle for Wear Your Wounds, bassist Greg Weeks and drummer Jon Rice joined the line-up. The band is named after the 1912 poem of the same name by Georg Heym.

In March 2020, the band announced its debut album, Shadow of Life, and issued the lead single, "Return to Zero". The record was produced by Converge guitarist Kurt Ballou. In April 2020, the music video for the track "Mantra of Madness" was released. In June 2020, the band released the second music video, "Ethereal Emptiness".

On March 25, 2024, the band announced their second album, Light of Death, would be released on June 7.

== Musical style ==
Umbra Vitae has been described as a death metal band. On the band's sound, Bannon has stated: "This is the closest thing I've done that's rooted in more traditional death metal, at least in terms of speed and ferocity and heaviness." According to Jamie Ludwig of Chicago Reader, the band's debut album "mixes 90s and modern influences with hardcore energy and plenty of grit, anxiety, and rage."

== Members ==
- Jacob Bannon — vocals (2020—present)
- Mike McKenzie — guitar (2020—present)
- Sean Martin — guitar (2020—present)
- Greg Weeks — bass (2020—present)
- Jon Rice — drums (2020—present)

== Discography ==
Studio albums

- Shadow of Life (2020)
- Light of Death (2024)

Singles

- "Return to Zero" (2020)
- "Mantra of Madness" (2020)
- "Belief is Obsolete" (2024)
- "Velvet Black" (2024)
- "Anti-Spirit Machine" (2024)

Music videos

- "Mantra of Madness" (2020)
- "Ethereal Emptiness" (2020)
