= Jane Doe (album) =

Studio album by Converge
- Released: September 4, 2001
- Recorded: 2001
- Studios: Q Division Studios, Somerville; GodCity Studio, Salem; Fort Apache Studios, Boston
- Genres: Metalcore; hardcore punk; post-hardcore
- Length: 45:22
- Label: Equal Vision
- Producers: Matthew Ellard; Kurt Ballou

Converge chronology
Deeper the Wound (2001)	Jane Doe (2001)	Unloved and Weeded Out (2003)

Jane Doe is the fourth studio album by American metalcore band Converge, released on September 4, 2001 by Equal Vision Records. The album was produced by Matthew Ellard alongside guitarist Kurt Ballou, and the artwork was designed by lead vocalist Jacob Bannon. It was the band's first album to feature bassist Nate Newton and drummer Ben Koller, and the last to feature guitarist Aaron Dalbec; Converge's line-up has remained stable since.

Although Jane Doe did not chart, it was a commercial breakthrough for the band and received immediate acclaim, with critics praising its poetic lyrics, dynamics, ferocity and production. It has since been listed as one of the greatest albums of the metalcore genre by various publications, and has developed a cult following, with the cover art becoming an icon of the band. A live version titled Jane Live was released in 2017.

== Writing and recording ==
Bannon stated in an interview that many of the songs on Jane Doe came from the side project Supermachiner; the project was claimed to inspire Jane Doe's experimental side. The title track and "Phoenix in Flight" were initially intended for the Supermachiner album Rise of the Great Machine, but Bannon thought it made sense for Converge to play them. Ballou has stated that Koller "reinvigorated" the band and pushed them in a new direction, and that prior to Newton joining the band, Ballou was the dominant songwriter. Ballou has said with the addition of Newton that the album became more collaborative in terms of songwriting, which was not the case prior.

The band had a greater budget of $11,000 to work with on Jane Doe, and its recording process differed from previous releases as a result. The entire album was recorded on six reels of two inch tape at three studios and mixed in two. It was mostly recorded at Q Division Studios, next door to James Taylor's recording session. Newton later recalled: "He [Taylor] kept sending his engineer over to tell us to be quiet. 'Mr. Taylor is trying to record vocal tracks, and you guys are goofing off and being way too loud over here.'"

Additional recording took place at GodCity Studio and Fort Apache, and took around three years. The band recorded for seven days at Q Division using two rooms dubbed "Studio A" and "Studio B". Studio A was used to record the slower songs because the room was bigger than Studio B, which Ellard stated was more optimal for invoking ambience in their sound than Studio B. Studio B was used to record the more uptempo songs due to its smaller size.

Newton stated in an interview, "I remember all of us wanting to write a hardcore record the kids were going to hate." Matthew Ellard, engineer and producer of Jane Doe, said he saw the album as a "big rock record" rather than a metal record. Ballou has stated that Jane Doe is the first Converge album that he is "proud of from start to finish".

== Music and lyrics ==
According to Bryan Rolli of Loudwire: "Jacob Bannon’s indecipherable barks mask his disarmingly poetic lyrics, while Kurt Ballou’s stabbing guitar riffs and Ben Koller’s dizzying drums send the songs hurtling forward at maximum velocity."

Bannon stated that the album's lyrical themes were born out of a dissolving relationship and the emotional fallout from that experience.

The lyrics found in Jane Doe's liner notes differ from some of the lyrics on the recorded tracks. The booklet lists the lyrics of the opening track "Concubine" as "For I felt the greatest of winters coming/ And I saw you as seasons shifting from blue to grey/ That's where the coldest of these days await me/And distance lays her heavy head beside me/ There I'll stay gold, forever gold", although the only lyrics said in the song are "You stay gold/I'll stay gold". Scott Butterworth of Noisey said, "It's a somewhat confusing incongruity, but at the same time, it's eerily reminiscent of a moment most of us have experienced. If you've ever planned an eloquent, well-reasoned speech in your head only to feel too overwhelmed, too hurt, too emotional to spit it out when the time came, you can understand the brilliant trick Bannon is pulling here."

== Artwork ==
The artwork for Jane Doe was designed and created by Jacob Bannon. The booklet features lyrics for each song on the album, which are intentionally scattered and difficult to decipher. Bannon stated, "Visually, I just wanted to capture that disillusionment with relationships and channel the negatives I felt. I did this in hopes of creating some sort of positive out of all the negative I was experiencing." The result was a mystery created from a variety of media, collage, photography, spraypaint, and ink that Bannon then assembled digitally. The cover image has since become their "de facto icon".

Bannon revealed in an interview that he abandoned multiple art projects to work on artwork for Jane Doe:

"Abandoning several other ongoing art projects so he could work on Jane Doe exclusively for a month, Bannon applied the same meticulous process in creating all of the companion images that appear in the album's 28-page CD booklet. "Once I had the basic images completed, including the cover, I worked on type treatments for the release," he says. "At first I used old Letraset type but later switched to contemporary typography as the project progressed. My goal was to continue the same kinetic feel of the imagery and make them one and the same.""

Bannon first stated the cover image was not based on any original model but on October 5, 2021, French actress and model Audrey Marnay asserted she was the basis for the "iconic" "Jane Doe" artwork. In an Instagram post, Marnay claimed that a photograph of her from the May 2001 issue of Marie Claire Italy, taken by Dutch fashion photographer Jan Welters, was the original source artwork used by Bannon. The following day, Bannon acknowledged on his personal social media accounts as well as the band's that the photo referenced by Marnay was indeed a primary source used to create the original stencil used for the album's artwork.

== Release and promotion ==
In mid-2000, Converge self-released a three-track record titled Jane Doe Demos during their 2000 tour, which were limited to 100 copies. The CDs contained unreleased demo versions of "Bitter and Then Some" and "Thaw" from the upcoming album, as well as a cover of "Whatever I Do" by Negative Approach.

Jane Doe was released on September 4, 2001 through Equal Vision Records as a CD and double vinyl which came in multiple colors. Converge's first tour in support of Jane Doe was in September 2001 with Drowningman and Playing Enemy. Drowningman later dropped out of the tour to work on a new album.

In 2002, a music video was released for the tracks "Concubine" and "Fault and Fracture", directed by Zach Merck, a longtime friend of the band. The video was filmed on location in Los Angeles in over three days in September. The band stated on their website that "although it's always difficult to hand over creative control of a project, we can safely say [Merck] did a commendable job on the project", and also gave special thanks to Ashley for "sitting in a bathtub of blood for over two hours".

Bannon's Deathwish Inc (under exclusive license from Equal Vision) repressed the album on vinyl, accompanied by a 28-page booklet. The double LP became available for pre-order at the Deathwish web store on April 1, 2010, and then became available in August 2010.

A live version of the album, Jane Live, was released on March 3, 2017. It features the band's full-album performance of Jane Doe at the 2016 Roadburn Festival in Tilburg, Netherlands.

== Reception and legacy ==
Professional ratings
Review scores
Source	Rating
AllMusic	4.5/5 stars
Chronicles of Chaos	9.5/10
Collector's Guide to Heavy Metal	10/10
The Encyclopedia of Popular Music	4/5 stars
Kerrang!	5/5 stars
Metal.de	9/10
Pitchfork	7.7/10
Punknews.org	4/5 stars
Sputnikmusic	5/5
Stylus	A−

Jane Doe received wider acclaim than Converge's previous albums, with Terrorizer naming it their Album of the Year. Christopher Dare of Pitchfork Media awarded the album with a rating of 7.7 out of 10, deeming it "so full of intelligence, skill and intensity that it's simply masterful." Blake Butler of Allmusic stated that Converge "put the final sealing blow on their status as a legend in the world of metallic hardcore" with the album, calling it "an experience -- an encyclopedic envelopment of so much at once." In 2007, Decibel magazine placed the album at number 35 on its "Decibel Hall of Fame" list, and later named it the best album of the 2000s. J. Bennett wrote that Jane Doe "was both a semi-melodic milestone ("Hell to Pay", "Phoenix in Flight", the title track) and a discordant landmark (everything else), far and away the most crucial metallic hardcore record since Cave In unleashed Until Your Heart Stops three years earlier". Sputnikmusic placed Jane Doe at number one on its list of the best albums of the 2000s, and Loudwire placed the album at number ten on its list of the 11 best metal albums of the 2000s. In March 2011, Jane Doe was inducted into the Rock Sound's "Hall of Fame", who described it as "a gamechanger in the entire realm of heavy music". In March 2023, Rolling Stone ranked the album's opening track, "Concubine", at number seventy-eight on their list of "The 100 Greatest Heavy Metal Songs of All Time".

The album has exerted considerable influence in extreme music circles and attained a cult following. Japanese band Heaven in Her Arms are named after the song of the same name. NME wrote in 2018: "The spasmodic, guttural twists and turns of Converge’s bile-packed, visceral take on hardcore are yet to be rivalled, 17 years after ‘Jane Doe’’s release." Revolver wrote in 2019: "Jane Doe is the record that launched a million T-shirts and tattoos with its iconic cover, but it’s the lasting impact on heavy music and the thousands of rip-off acts that truly speak to its legacy. Helping to shape the landscape of American heavy metal for the next decade and beyond, this metalcore masterpiece deservedly remains Converge’s most beloved record, as well as a genre favorite, even now, 18 years after its bombastic debut." In 2021, Eli Enis of Revolver included the song "Concubine" in his list of the "15 Greatest Album-Opening Songs in Metal".

In 2025, Rolli of Loudwire said it was the band's best album and wrote: "To the uninitiated, Jane Doe sounds like an impenetrable wall of bloodcurdling hardcore. To faithful Converge fans, it also sounds like an impenetrable wall of bloodcurdling hardcore — but in a complimentary way. [...] Jane Doe has worked its tendrils into various strains of metalcore and inspired legions of imitators, though none can hold a candle to its destructive onslaught."

=== Accolades ===
A "—" denotes the publication's list is in no particular order, and Jane Doe did not rank numerically.

Publication	Country	Accolade	Year	Rank
Terrorizer	UK	Albums of the Year 2001	2001	1
Decibel	US	Decibel Hall of Fame	2007	35
MetalSucks	US	21 Best Metal Albums of the 21st Century... So Far	2009	5
Noisecreep	US	Best Albums of the 2000s	2009	1
NPR Music	US	More Important '00s Music	2009	—
Terrorizer	UK	Critics' Albums of the Decade	2009	4
Sputnikmusic	US	Top 100 Albums of the Decade	2010	1
Decibel	US	The Top 100 Greatest Metal Albums of the Decade	2010	1
Loudwire	US	Top 11 Metal Albums of the 2000s	2011	10
Rock Sound	UK	Rock Sound's 101 Modern Classics: The Final Instalment!	2012	15
LA Weekly	US	Top 20 Hardcore Albums in History	2013	5
Artistdirect	US	Top 15 New Wave Of American Heavy Metal Albums	2015	13
Kerrang!	UK	50 Albums You Need to Hear Before You Die	2015	21
Rolling Stone	US	The 100 Greatest Metal Albums of All Time	2017	61
Loudwire	US	The 25 Best Metalcore Albums of All Time	2017	1
Kerrang!	UK	The 21 Best US Metalcore Albums of All Time	2020	—

== Track listing ==
All lyrics are written by Jacob Bannon; all music is composed by Converge

No.	Title	Length
1.	"Concubine"	1:19
2.	"Fault and Fracture"	3:05
3.	"Distance and Meaning"	4:18
4.	"Hell to Pay"	4:32
5.	"Homewrecker"	3:51
6.	"The Broken Vow"	2:13
7.	"Bitter and Then Some"	1:28
8.	"Heaven in Her Arms"	4:01
9.	"Phoenix in Flight"	3:49
10.	"Phoenix in Flames"	0:42
11.	"Thaw"	4:30
12.	"Jane Doe"	11:34
Total length:		45:22

== Personnel ==
Jane Doe personnel adapted from CD liner notes.

Converge

- Jacob Bannon – vocals
- Kurt Ballou – guitar, vocals, theremin
- Aaron Dalbec – guitar
- Nate Newton – bass, vocals, theremin
- Ben Koller – drums

Guest musicians

- Kevin Baker (The Hope Conspiracy) – backing vocals on "The Broken Vow"
- Tre McCarthy (Deathwish Inc.) – backing vocals on "The Broken Vow"
- Caleb Scofield credited as "Secret C" – backing vocals on "The Broken Vow"

Artwork and design

- Atomic! ID – art direction and design (Note: Atomic ID was Jacob Bannon's design company. All art direction and design is credited to Bannon on the vinyl reissue.)

Production and recording history

- Fred Archambalt – recording assistant
- Kurt Ballou – recording, pre-production, mixing
- Jacob Bannon – mixing
- Matt Beaudoin – recording assistant
- Mathew Ellard – recording, mixing
- Alan Douches – mastering
- Andy Hong – pre-production
- Carl Plaster – drum tech
- Recorded at Q Division, God City and Fort Apache
- Mixed at Fort Apache
- Mastered at West West Side
- All recording and mixing was performed in an analog format.
