= Rise of the Great Machine =

2000 studio album by Supermachiner

Studio album by Supermachiner
- Released: November 28, 2000
- Recorded: 1994–2000
- Studio: GodCity, Salem, Massachusetts
- Length: 60:33
- Label: Undecided
- Producer: Kurt Ballou

Supermachiner chronology
Rise of the Great Machine (2000)	Rust (2009)

Professional ratings
Review scores
Source	Rating
Scene Point Blank	7.7/10 stars
Stereo Killer	4/5

Rise of the Great Machine is the debut and only studio album by the project Supermachiner. It was released on November 28, 2000, through Undecided Records. The album features artwork created by Jacob Bannon.

== Writing and recording ==
"In 1994, we started experimenting with this and people [in Boston] would be like what the hell are you doing? We were trying to get really simple, powerful songwriting down, crafting a more experimental, minimalist kind of writing, and it was just a unique approach at the time."

— Jacob Bannon,

Writing for the album began in 1994 and soon after became a collection of four track recordings, however the project remained inactive for a number of years. When Converge had about six months of down time as the band searched for a drummer, Jacob Bannon and Ryan Parker found the time to resurrect the project. They entered GodCity Studios with Kurt Ballou in the winter of 1999, to take on the piles of old four track tapes they had. During the sessions, Ballou contributed a great deal to the album material both as an engineer and musician.

Bannon stated in an interview that many of the songs off Converge's Jane Doe came from Supermachiner, the project was claimed to inspire Jane Doe's experimental side. The songs "Jane Doe" and "Phoenix in Flight" were initially intended for the Supermachiner but Bannon thought "it made sense for Converge to play them."

== Release ==
Rise of the Great Machine was released on compact disc by Undecided Records in the summer of 2000. A 2xLP version was scheduled to be co-released by Undecided Records and Temperance Records in late 2000, but after continuous delays it was ultimately cancelled. In 2005, Undecided Records repressed the compact disc edition with a slightly updated layout.

In 2004, Icarus Records, a subsidiary of Bannon's Deathwish, Inc. record label, hand-made 50 copies of Rise of the Great Machine on compact disc. The release was sold exclusively at Converge's merch table during their You Fail Me 2K4 Tour (promoting You Fail Me) in September and October 2004.

The album was reissued in 2008 by French record label E-Vinyl on a double LP, limited to 1000 copies.

=== Rust ===
Rust

Compilation album by Supermachiner
- Released: March 16, 2009
- Studio: GodCity, Salem, Massachusetts
- Length: 114:44; 60:33 (disc 1); 54:11 (disc 2)
- Label: Deathwish
- Producer: Kurt Ballou

Supermachiner chronology
Rise of the Great Machine (2000)	Rust (2009)

Eight years after the release of Rise of the Great Machine, Deathwish Inc. announced the release of Rust, a 30 track double CD that featured remastered versions of the Rise of the Great Machine tracks along with b-sides of forgotten songs and additional audio experiments done by the band. Rust was released on March 16, 2009.

== Musical style and theme ==
The music was much different than Bannon's band Converge, having more in common with influences Swans, Bauhaus, and others. The lyrical content is built around the rise of technology and the death of the individual.

== Track listing ==
All lyrics are written by Jacob Bannon; all music is composed by Supermachiner

No.	Title	Length
1.	"Rise of the Great Machine"	2:31
2.	"Flight of Vultures"	0:44
3.	"I Am Legend"	4:31
4.	"Declaration One"	2:12
5.	"Above You"	1:11
6.	"The War We'll Never Win"	2:58
7.	"Vicious Circles"	1:04
8.	"By the Roadside"	6:01
9.	"I Am Oblivion"	2:08
10.	"Treading in the Wake of It All"	5:15
11.	"Below You"	4:03
12.	"Bitter Cold"	6:33
13.	"A New Day"	1:06
14.	"A New Loss"	3:18
15.	"Fireflies Light the Way"	4:40
16.	"Remember My Name"	4:37
17.	"A New Precipice Before Us"	1:18
18.	"Declaration Two"	4:11
19.	"Reign of the Great Machine"	2:12

Rust (disc two)
No.	Title	Length
20.	"Hearts Degrade / We Rust"	4:19
21.	"Pick Up the Pieces (Driven Version)"	4:52
22.	"Diamond Bullet"	8:29
23.	"Declaration (Disrupted Version)"	2:56
24.	"Slow Is the Pace of Burden"	7:23
25.	"Grant Me To the Strength"	5:02
26.	"Our Ground Is Sour"	2:31
27.	"Memoriale Rituum"	2:30
28.	"Avalanche"	4:36
29.	"Pick Up the Pieces (Broken Version)"	4:47
30.	"End of the Line"	6:46

- Track 13 "A New Day" is mislabeled "A New Day A New Loss" on the original Undecided Records issue of the album. As a result, track 14, "A New Loss" received the name of track 15 and track 15 received the name of track 16 and so on throughout the track listing, leaving the final track to be titled "Last".
- Disc one of Rust is a reissue of Rise of the Great Machine.

== Personnel ==
Supermachiner

- Jacob Bannon – vocals, guitar, electronics
- Ryan Parker – vocals, bass, electronics

Additional musicians

- Seth Bannon – percussion, electronics
- Kurt Ballou – guitar, saxophone, electronics
- Akina Kawauchi – violin

Production and recording

- Kurt Ballou – producer, engineer at GodCity
- Dave Merullo – mastering, editing at M-Works

Artwork

- Jacob Bannon – design
