= You Fail Me =

Studio album by Converge
- Released: September 20, 2004
- Recorded: March 2004
- Studios: GodCity, Salem; Magpie Sound Design, Boston, Massachusetts; Witch Doctor
- Genres: Metalcore; hardcore punk; post-hardcore
- Length: 35:26
- Label: Epitaph
- Producers: Alan Douches; Kurt Ballou

Converge chronology
Unloved and Weeded Out (2003)	You Fail Me (2004)	No Heroes (2006)

You Fail Me is the fifth studio album by American metalcore band Converge, released on September 20, 2004, by Epitaph Records. The band's first release for the label, it was produced by Alan Douches and guitarist Kurt Ballou, with the artwork created by vocalist Jacob Bannon.

You Fail Me was the band's first album to chart commercially, reaching number 171 on the Billboard 200; it also reached number 12 on the Top Heatseekers chart and number 16 on the Independent Albums chart.

In 2023, Matt Mills of Metal Hammer included the track "Eagles Become Vultures" in his list of "the 10 heaviest metal breakdowns of all time".

== Background and recording ==
Converge began writing for You Fail Me after they recorded Jane Doe; they wrote on the road during sound checks of shows. Much of the material was worked out in a live setting for some time before the band entered the studio. Bannon stated, "it definitely added a new level of refinement to the album material." Recording for the album took place in March 2004, mainly at GodCity Studio, with additional recording at Magpie Sound Design and Witch Doctor Studio.

== Musical style and themes ==
When asked about the concept of the album, Bannon said:

"After Jane Doe was recorded and released, I thought I was going to feel the emotional burden I was carrying lift from my shoulders. I had all the puzzle pieces there in front of me. Outlets bring closure, or at least that's what I thought. With that, I put myself out on the line looking for an emotional resolve with "Jane..." and it never came. When the album was released I didn't feel any better, nothing was changed. My depression kept collapsing on itself. At that point I stopped hoping and searching and I took a long hard look at my life and at my heart. I did a huge amount of soul searching and found so much failure within myself. That discovery was a massive realization. As I started to see clear again, I also saw the failure in friends and loved ones around me. How we fail each other, and how we fail ourselves. These are songs of failure. And ultimately, surviving self destruction and tragedy we all face in our lives. Musically our only goal was to write an album that moved us and challenged us. We feel we accomplished that."

Bannon stated the lyrics are "opinionated" and that there was definitely a "rage" in the writing not apparent in previous albums. Bannon later said in an interview with Epitaph,

I continued to write and continued to do a great deal of soul searching. In that I found so much failure in myself, friends, and loved ones. These are our songs of failure---how we fail each other and how we fail ourselves. It's about standing up and taking responsibility. It's about facing that demon. It's about putting the practice of living in front of the act of dying every day. It's about surviving."

== Release and promotion ==
You Fail Me was released on September 20, 2004 by Epitaph Records (September 20 in Europe and September 21 in the USA). Converge's first headlining tour in support of the album began in September 2004 with Cave In and Between the Buried and Me. On this tour, Converge sold copies of Bannon's side-project Supermachiner's album Rise of the Great Machine, limited to 50 copies.

On February 14, 2005, a music video was released for the track "Eagles Become Vultures", directed by Zach Merck.

=== You Fail Me Redux ===
On June 17, 2016, Converge reissued the album as You Fail Me Redux through Epitaph and Deathwish. The band was "never quite content" with the original mix, and had guitarist Kurt Ballou remix the album and Alan Douches remaster it. The reissue also features updated cover artwork with an inverted color scheme, a black-outlined hand on a white background. The redux had the same track list as the vinyl version of the original album.

In an interview with Noisey, Ballou explained why he felt the album needed to be remixed:

"You Fail Me was the last time Converge did a record where I wasn't involved in the entire engineering process. The record that followed You Fail Me, which was No Heroes, was the first time that I both recorded and mixed a Converge record, with the exception of The Poacher Diaries, which was an EP or a split. Upon completing No Heroes and managing to make my bandmates happy with the work I did on that record, I thought that I'd really like to go back and remix You Fail Me. I recorded that one, but Matt Ellard, who did most of the engineering work on Jane Doe, was the one who mixed it. But it was also mixed under less than ideal circumstances. [...] Jane Doe was mixed at Fort Apache on a console that Matt was familiar with, and we had sufficient time to do those mixes. With You Fail Me, he came up and mixed in my studio, which he'd never worked in before, and it was an unfamiliar console. He's a very malleable engineer and can work anywhere, but it probably wasn't his top choice to mix at my place. We also kept having power outages during the mixes. I can't remember the exact details, but I think we booked six days of mixing with him, but he ended up having to do it in about three because he'd come in, work for half an hour, and the power would go out. It was mixed in the summer under brownout conditions, so we'd have electricity in the morning while it was still relatively cool but then as things heated up in the afternoon we'd lose power. So he spent a lot of time lying on the couch waiting for the power to come back on. I still think it turned out great, but there was something about the lack of consistency from song to song and a few other details that made me want to remix it. Sonically, I wanted to make it fit more logically between Jane Doe and No Heroes."

== Critical reception ==
Professional ratings
Review scores
Source	Rating
AllMusic	link
Collector's Guide to Heavy Metal	9/10
The Encyclopedia of Popular Music	2/5 stars
Lambgoat	link
Pitchfork	8.0/10
Sputnikmusic	link
Stylus Magazine	A link

You Fail Me received positive reviews from critics. AllMusic said that the album "manages to hit all the right emotional highs and lows" and called it "a visceral and bracing blend of metal and old-school, CBGB-worthy gutter hardcore". Joe Pazner of Stylus Magazine said that "Converge has emerged an impeccably pared-down case study in calculated cruelty, resourcefulness and cunning tempered by desperation. More than any record in their expansive catalog, You Fail Me stands as testament to the brutal necessities Converge has created to ensure its survival." Adam Turner-Heffer of Sputnikmusic called the band "as important as Botch and Palehorse in their own genres, and with [You Fail Me], they are here to prove it". Sam Ubl of Pitchfork said, "Not only have Converge retained (even sharpened) their razorblade cut, they're now bolstered by a brawny low-end".

== Track listing ==
All lyrics written by Jacob Bannon; all music composed by Converge.

No.	Title	Length
1.	"First Light"	1:01
2.	"Last Light"	3:33
3.	"Black Cloud"	2:19
4.	"Drop Out"	2:31
5.	"Hope Street"	1:06
6.	"Heartless"	2:28
7.	"You Fail Me"	5:36
8.	"In Her Shadow"	6:25
9.	"Eagles Become Vultures"	2:10
10.	"Death King"	2:07
11.	"In Her Blood"	4:06
12.	"Hanging Moon"	2:04
Total length:		35:26

Vinyl edition and Redux
No.	Title	Length
1.	"First Light"	1:01
2.	"Last Light"	3:33
3.	"Black Cloud"	2:19
4.	"Drop Out"	2:31
5.	"Hope Street"	1:06
6.	"Heartless"	2:28
7.	"You Fail Me"	5:36
8.	"In Her Shadow"	6:25
9.	"Eagles Become Vultures"	2:10
10.	"Wolves at My Door"	2:32
11.	"Death King"	2:07
12.	"In Her Blood"	4:06
13.	"Hanging Moon"	2:04
Total length:		37:58

== Personnel ==
Adapted from CD liner notes.

Converge

- Jacob Bannon – vocals, lyrics
- Kurt Ballou – guitars, vocals, bass guitar, keyboards, percussion
- Nate Newton – bass, vocals
- Ben Koller – drums, percussion

Additional musicians

- Shawn Moseley – piano on "In Her Shadow"

Production

- Kurt Ballou – recording at GodCity, Magpie and Witch Doctor; mixing at GodCity
- Jacob Bannon – mixing at GodCity
- Alan Douches – mastering at West West Side
- Matthew Ellard – mixing at GodCity
- Shawn Moseley – additional engineering
- Chris Moylan – additional engineering

Artwork

- Jacob Bannon – artwork

Redux production

- Alan Douches – remastering at GodCity
- Kurt Ballou – remixing at GodCity

== Chart performance ==
Chart (2004)	Peak position
Japanese Album Chart	246
UK Album Chart	190
US Billboard 200	171
US Billboard Heatseekers Albums	12
US Billboard Independent Albums	16

=== Redux ===
Chart (2016)	Peak position
US Billboard Vinyl Albums	11
