= Halo in a Haystack =

Studio album by Converge
- Released: 1994
- Studio: West Sound Studio
- Genre: Metalcore; hardcore punk
- Length: 36:00
- Label: Earthmaker; Stolnacke

Converge chronology
Halo in a Haystack (1994)	Caring and Killing (1995)

Professional ratings
Review scores
Source	Rating
The Encyclopedia of Popular Music	3/5 stars

Halo in a Haystack is the debut album by American metalcore band Converge, released in 1994 through Earthmaker Records.

== Production and release ==
To fund the making of the record, vocalist Jacob Bannon saved up money from working at a nursing home. The record was released as a black vinyl and is not available in any other format. Only 1000 copies of this record were made and the record has not been reprinted since. However all of the record's tracks with the exception of the 9th track "Exhale" can be found on later Converge releases such as 1995's Caring and Killing and 2002's Unloved & Weeded Out.

== Track listing ==
All tracks written by Converge.

No.	Title	Length
1.	"Shallow Breathing"	1:56
2.	"I Abstain"	3:12
3.	"Two Day Romance"	3:34
4.	"Becoming a Stranger"	4:07
5.	"Divinity"	4:16
6.	"Fact Leaves Its Ghost"	2:29
7.	"Antithesis"	5:25
8.	"Down"	4:59
9.	"Exhale"	3:44
10.	"Undo"	2:18
Total length:		36:00

== Personnel ==
Converge

- Jacob Bannon – vocals
- Kurt Ballou – guitar
- Aaron Dalbec – guitar
- Jeff Feinburg – bass guitar
- Damon Bellorado – drums

Session musicians

- Erik Ralston – bass guitar (tracks 8, 9)

Artwork and design

- John Murray – cover
- Tre McCarthy – photography
