= Supermachiner =

US musical group

- Origin: Boston, Massachusetts, U.S.
- Genres: Experimental
- Years active: 1994–2000
- Labels: Undecided; Deathwish
- Members: Jacob Bannon; Ryan Parker

Supermachiner was an experimental music project that Jacob Bannon and Ryan Parker began writing for in 1994 and soon became a collection of four track recordings. When Converge had about six months of down time as the band searched for a drummer, Bannon and Parker found the time to resurrect that project. Bannon and Parker named the project "Supermachiner", a play on the term "Supermachinder" the compound word for Japanese giant robot toys from the 1970s. The music was very different from Converge's, having more in common with influences Swans, Bauhaus, and others.

== History ==
"In 1994, we started experimenting with this and people [in Boston] would be like what the hell are you doing? We were trying to get really simple, powerful songwriting down, crafting a more experimental, minimalist kind of writing, and it was just a unique approach at the time."

— Jacob Bannon,

Supermachiner originally began as a collection of 4 track recordings by Bannon and Parker, recorded in 1994, just prior to Bannon moving to Boston to attend college. The project remained nameless and dormant for a number of years. With the help and inspiration of his good friend Parker, they casually brought the project back to life in the winter of 1998. With his input, they developed collective song ideas into the Rise of the Great Machine album. Bannon structured the lyrical content around his feelings on the rise of technology and the death of the individual, making the project thematic in its content. They entered GodCity Studios with Kurt Ballou in the winter of 1999 to take on the piles of old four track tapes they had. Ballou contributed a great deal to the album material both as an engineer and musician and both Ballou and the band brought something to the table. After the recording was complete, there was little/no time to carry on with the project. The original Rise of the Great Machine CD was released by the Undecided label in 2000 (now out of print). After the album was released future projects were planned but never materialized. However Bannon continued to write music that was sonically different from Converge, which was later released as solo martial many years later.

The original Rise of the Great Machine CD was released by Undecided Records in 2000. In 2004, the album was sold at Converge's You Fail Me 2004 tour, this version of the album was limited to 50 copies. The album was reissued in 2008, released by the E-Vinyl label in France, it was released as a one time pressing as a deluxe double vinyl, limited to 1000 copies. Eight years after the release of Rise of the Great Machine, Deathwish Inc. announced the release of Rust, a 30 track double CD that featured remastered versions of the Rise of the Great Machine tracks along with b-sides of forgotten songs and additional audio experiments. Rust was released on March 16, 2009.

== Members ==
- Jacob Bannon – vocals, guitar, electronics
- Ryan Parker – vocals, bass, electronics
- Seth Bannon (Jacob's brother) percussion, electronics

== Discography ==
Albums

- Rise of the Great Machine (2000)
- Rust (2009)
