= Jacob Bannon =

American vocalist (born 1976)

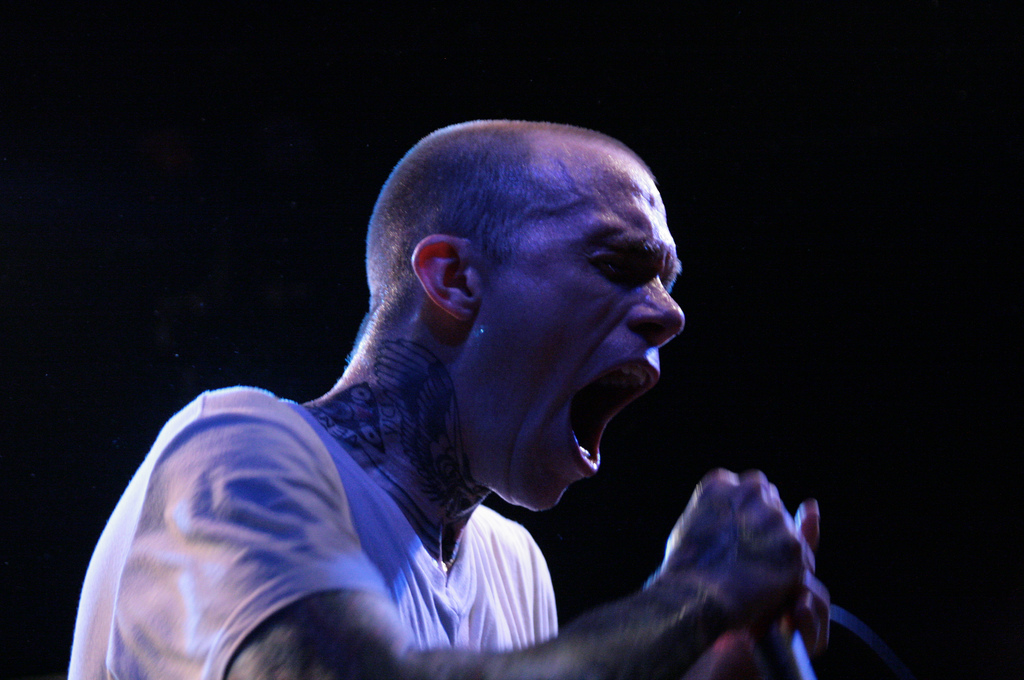
- Bannon performing in 2008

Background information
- Also known as: Wear Your Wounds
- Born: October 15, 1976 (age 50); Stoughton, Massachusetts, U.S.
- Genres: Metalcore; hardcore punk; mathcore; post-hardcore; experimental; death metal; industrial metal
- Occupations: Singer; songwriter; graphic artist
- Years active: 1990–present
- Member of: Converge; Supermachiner; Irons; Umbra Vitae; Blood from the Soul
- Website: jacobbannon.com

Jacob Bannon (born October 15, 1976) is an American musician and visual artist who is best known as the vocalist for the metalcore band Converge. He is the co-founder and owner of the record label Deathwish Inc. and the author of many visual works for independent punk rock and heavy metal musicians. Bannon has also composed and performed experimental music as Supermachiner with Ryan Parker and more recently as Wear Your Wounds.

Bannon exclusively employs screaming and other forms of harsh vocals without the augmentation of clean singing. Joe Davita of Loudwire described his style as "at times sounding less like a voice and more like a percussive instrument adding yet another hard-hitting layer to the music".

== Early life ==
Bannon was born in 1976. He grew up splitting his time between Andover in the Merrimack Valley, Charlestown, and East Boston on some weekends. During his freshman year of high school, he sustained a severe knee injury after jumping off a bridge and hitting a shopping cart. He claims "everything in my knee literally exploded", causing him to miss months of school. He said, "that was like the end of my adolescence in a lot of ways."

At 17, he graduated high school early and chose to work until leaving for college. He relocated to metro Boston and attended college at The Art Institute of Boston, earning a bachelor's degree in Fine Arts for design in 1998, and subsequently taught the subject at a college level for a brief time. He received the "Excellence In Design" accolade from the institution, and briefly instructed there himself, participating in its "Continuing Education" program.

== Musical career ==
=== Converge ===
Converge is an American metalcore band formed in the winter of 1990 by vocalist Jacob Bannon and guitarist Kurt Ballou, they were later joined by bassist Jeff Feinburg, and drummer Damon Bellorado. They started by playing covers of hardcore punk, punk rock and heavy metal songs. The band soon graduated to playing live performances in 1991, after recording some demos on a 4-track recorder. Converge have enjoyed a relatively high level of recognition. Their popularity began to rise with the release of a breakthrough album Jane Doe. Converge's records have gradually become more elaborate and expensive to produce. This progression began with their move from a small independent label (Equal Vision Records) to a considerably larger one (Epitaph Records). Special releases have traditionally been handled by Bannon's record label, Deathwish Inc.

=== Wear Your Wounds ===
After Supermachiner released Rise of the Great Machine and after Converge had completed recording Jane Doe, Bannon started writing and recording solo material under the name Dear Lover. Although a number of releases were lined up none of them saw the light of day except a demo version of one track "Grant Me the Strength" which was made available for download on Converge's website in January 2003. The track was supposed to be part of an EP titled The Blood of Thine Enemies, however, the EP was never released. The track was later featured on Supermachiner's 2009 album Rust.

There was also a Dear Lover double album planned, titled Wear Your Wounds to be released through Icarus Records. In January 2005, Dear Lover recordings were said to have been in the editing and mixing process, and it was believed there would be multiple releases of Dear Lover recordings which included the Wear Your Wounds double album throughout the year, however this did not happen. In March 2008 the single "The Blood of Thine Enemies" was released on Deathwish. Bannon released the song under the name J.Bannon. Bannon stated the song was never intended to be part of an album, only to be a stand-alone piece. Converge's website also changed the use of the name Dear Lover to J.Bannon in the upcoming section where the Wear Your Wounds album was listed. Initially planning since 2008 on releasing solo music under his name only, in 2012 Bannon began using the Wear Your Wounds name for these projects. This allowed others to collaborate and work with Bannon on future projects.

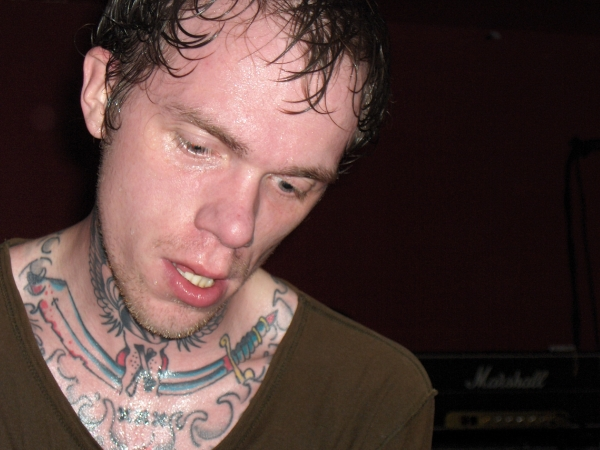
Bannon in 2005

On November 16, 2012, Bannon and Ben Chisholm of Chelsea Wolfe released a split 7-inch EP titled Wear Your Wounds and Revelator, it was the first time Bannon released anything under then name Wear Your Wounds. On January 15, 2013, a digital single was released under the name Wear Your Wounds titled "The Migration".

The long-awaited Wear Your Wounds album, now titled to the abbreviation WYW was finally set on release on April 7, 2017, and was released by Deathwish. The album has multiple guest musicians such as Kurt Ballou, Mike McKenzie, Chris Maggio, and Sean Martin. The single "Goodbye Old Friend" was released on January 13, 2017. On March 3, 2017, the non-album single "Arthritic Heart", physical copies were available with New Noise Magazine. Wear Your Wounds' live debut was on April 22 at the Roadburn festival in Tilburg, the Netherlands.

The Wear Your Wounds live band has been described as a supergroup with Bannon on piano, bass and vocal duties, guitarists Mike McKenzie (of The Red Chord) Adam McGrath (of Cave In), Sean Martin (of Hatebreed) and drummer Chris Maggio (of Trap Them). Bannon has said, "[a] lot of them are guys that contributed on the record. We're going to be a three-guitar band and I'll be playing bass sort of intermittently with a lot of the stuff, because there is bass on the record but not all over the place. It's basically a bunch of friends that were available and want to play this sort of music, have fun and explore this world that I started on my own."

=== Additional projects and contributions ===
==== Supermachiner (1994–2000) ====
Supermachiner was an experimental rock project formed in 1994 by Jacob Bannon and Ryan Parker. Supermachiner originally began as a collection of 4 track recordings by Bannon and Parker, recorded in 1994. The project remained nameless and dormant for a number of years. With the help and inspiration of his good friend Ryan Parker, they casually brought the project back to life in the winter of 1998. With his input, they developed collective song ideas into the Rise of the Great Machine album, released through Undecided Records. However, Bannon continued to write music that was sonically different from Converge, which was later released as solo material many years later. Three of his solo projects, Urtica, The Blood of Thine Enemies and Dear Lover were quickly signed to Undecided Records. Urtica's full-length album, The Oblivion Sessions, was scheduled for release via Undecided Records in the summer of 2001, but was abandoned.

Bannon was also commissioned by Undecided Films to compose and record a new score for the 1922 film Nosferatu in 2003.

==== Irons (2007–2011) ====
Irons is a musical collaboration between Jacob Bannon, Dwid Hellion and Stephen Kasner. In 2006, Hellion approached Bannon to discuss the possibility of creating music together. In late 2007, fine artist and musician Stephen Kasner also expressed interest in working with the pair, leading to the formation of Irons that year. The objective of the project was to create apocalyptic, non-linear music from a fine art-oriented mindset. Irons only released one split album with Pulling Teeth titled Grey Savior. It was released through Deathwish on April 1, 2011 .

==== Blood from the Soul (2020–present) ====
In 2020, Bannon joined the industrial metal supergroup Blood from the Soul, which started out as a collaboration between Shane Embury and Sick of It All vocalist Lou Koller. The line-up of the band also features drummer Dirk Verbeuren and Nasum bassist Jesper Liveröd. The band released the album, DSM-5, in 2020 on Deathwish, Inc. Bannon has handled the vocals and visuals on this record.

==== Umbra Vitae (2020–present) ====
In 2020, Bannon formed the death metal group Umbra Vitae with members of Twitching Tongues, The Red Chord and Uncle Acid & the Deadbeats. The band released its debut album, Shadow of Life in the same year.

== Visual art ==
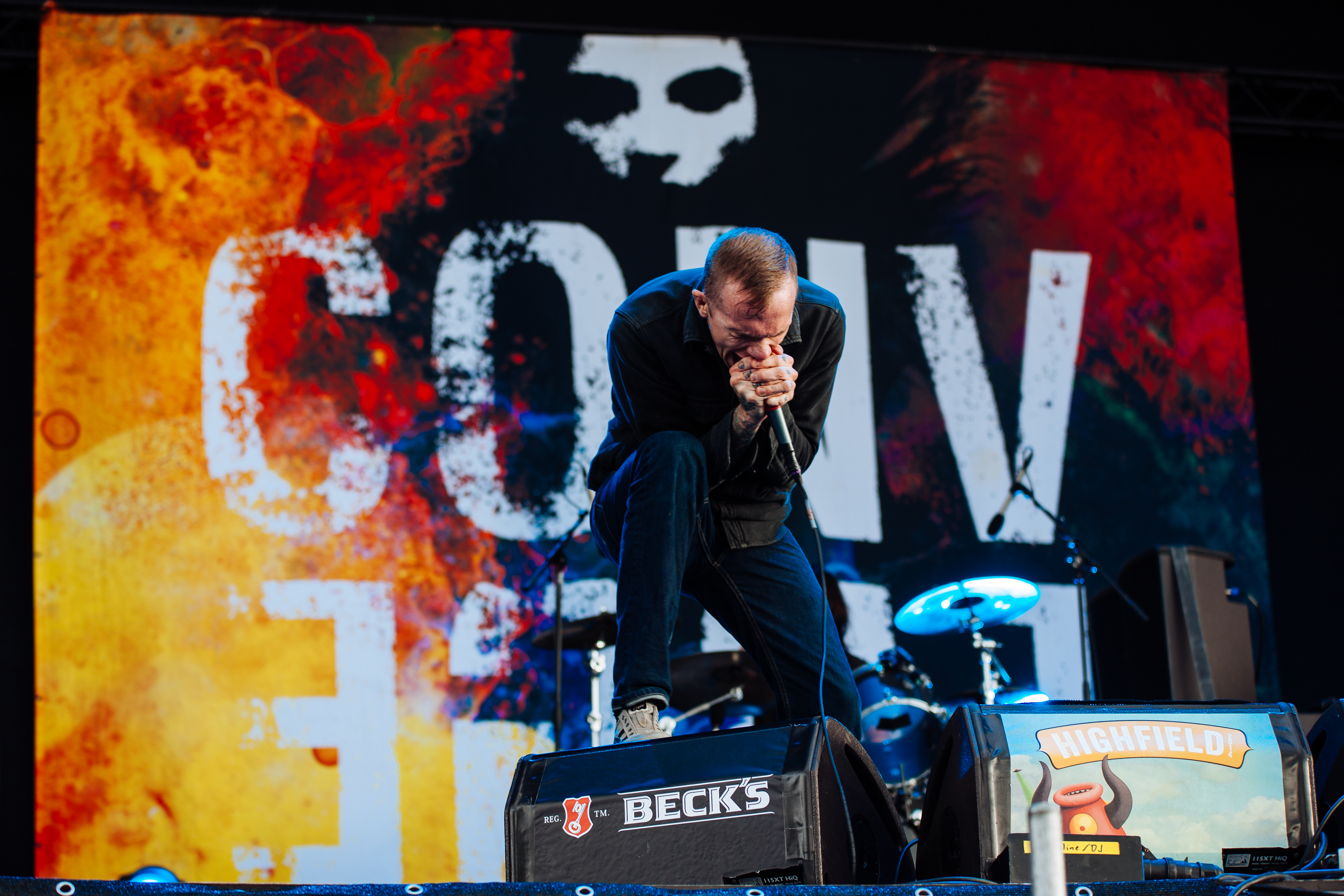
Bannon performing with Converge at Highfield Festival 2013 in Großpösna

After working an assortment of design jobs at various firms throughout his youth, Bannon became a freelance artist and designer, primarily working within underground and extreme music communities. His art and design work predominately involves hardcore punk bands and releasing limited edition art prints. He has stated that his art and design work pays his bills. Since 1997, he has produced art for dozens of bands. Work for these bands has involved packaging, poster, web, apparel, and logo design. Some of his design work has been credited to his art company Atomic! ID. He designed a shirt for Hatewear, the online boutique of Hatebreed's Jamey Jasta. He is also responsible for the art direction, and often the design work, for some of the releases on his Deathwish Inc. record label.

His work has been described as "heavily textured with a kinetic energy and unsettling feel". Tim Lambesis of As I Lay Dying praised Bannon's work on their Shadows Are Security album art and stated that it "is probably the biggest selling record that Jake has ever done artwork for ... [even though] his ethic and his whole approach to art isn't really about sales and numbers." Bannon's style has been influential; as one magazine article put it, he "is often credited with inventing the so-called skull with wings aesthetic that became so popular in the punk underground and mixed martial arts scenes that today knockoffs are available in stores like Target and Marshalls."

In 2004, Bannon released a series of 4 "museum-quality" giclée prints, with a run limited to 100. He has worked with Burlesque Design to have limited series screenprints produced of some of his artwork, including two limited edition Converge tour posters and limited prints based on the album artwork for the Converge albums Jane Doe, No Heroes, and Axe to Fall. The Jane Doe cover art was featured on the cover of the sixth issue of Beautiful/Decay Magazine, which also contained an interview with Bannon. He also designed a limited-edition cover for the May/June 2005 issue of Punk Planet, which was their third Art & Design themed issue.

On August 15, 2004, he participated in Strhess Fest in Cleveland. In February 2008, he participated in the Public Domain group art show, and October 2008, his artwork was featured in a Halloween themed group show titled Horror Business, both held at Tradition in Los Angeles. In October 2010, Bannon had work in the Scream With Me show at 111 Minna Gallery in San Francisco, which featured the artwork of selected musicians and tattoo artists.

=== List of bands for whom Bannon has designed ===
Bannon has worked on art and design for dozens of bands, including:

- 100 Demons
- 108
- A Life Once Lost
- Antagonist A.D.
- As I Lay Dying
- Bane
- Blacklisted
- Blood Has Been Shed
- Breaking Pangaea
- Cave In
- Cold World
- Converge
- Cursed
- Death Before Dishonor
- Disfear
- Doomriders
- Drowningman
- Embrace Today
- End of a Year
- Every Time I Die
- Fall Out Boy
- Give Up the Ghost
- Goatwhore
- The Great Deceiver
- Harm's Way
- The Hope Conspiracy
- Integrity
- Killing the Dream
- Knuckledust
- Knut
- Martyr A.D.
- Modern Life Is War
- Narrows
- Nine
- No Warning
- NORA
- Norma Jean
- One King Down
- Orange Island
- P.O.S
- Poison the Well
- Pulling Teeth
- Reach the Sky
- Remembering Never
- Ringworm
- Rise and Fall
- Scars of Tomorrow
- Sepultura
- Shadows Fall
- Shipwreck A.D.
- Supermachiner
- This Is Hell
- Trap Them
- Underoath
- United Nations
- Victims
- Voorhees
- Where Fear and Weapons Meet
- Wovenhand

== Business ventures ==
=== Deathwish Inc. ===
Deathwish, Inc. is an independent record label founded by Bannon and Tre McCarthy. In late 1999, McCarthy and Bannon decided to turn Deathwish into a full-fledged business.

Deathwish is one of those labels that deserve to be the biggest indie label on the planet. They not only put out interesting acts, but they go through painstaking efforts with every aspect of each release from artwork to recording to the band's branding. These efforts definitely do not go unnoticed to their many die-hard fans, but it is disheartening to see bands/labels with less than 10 percent of the integrity that Deathwish has continued to outsell them. It gives me comfort that these are things that Jacob and Tre do not concern themselves with as they continue to put out powerful and beautiful releases.

— Virgil Dickerson, IndieHQ

=== Diamonds & Rust ===
Bannon co-owns a home décor and antique store with his wife in Beverly, Massachusetts called Diamonds & Rust, which offers, "a variety of new/vintage industrial and mid-century furniture and lighting, textiles, art, and other collectibles and accessories."

== Impact ==
Sammy O'Hagar of MetalSucks wrote:

Jacob Bannon’s place in metal, hardcore, and—for better or worse—metalcore is massive, with his trademark vocals incalculably influential and lyrics favoring the abstract over the melodramatic.

== Personal life ==
He is a vegetarian and follows a straight edge lifestyle. From 2005 to 2008, he was nominated for the title of "World's Sexiest Vegetarian" by Peta2. Bannon is married and has two children. He is concerned with the greyhound-racing industry, and is a dog owner, having owned rescued greyhounds, pit bulls, among other breeds.

Bannon is also an avid mixed martial arts and kickboxing fan, having trained in boxing and Muay Thai, and obtained a license as an MMA instructor in the state of Massachusetts, occasionally working as a judge. Accordingly, Deathwish has sponsored some MMA fighters. Bannon is known for his extensive tattoos. He received his first tattoo at the age of 15, which has since been covered by other tattoos. He has been tattooed by Darren Brass, among many other artists. In 2013, Bannon was the subject of a short documentary directed by Ian McFarland titled "Rungs in a Ladder." In the documentary, Bannon reflected on pivotal moments in his life and his motivation as an artist.

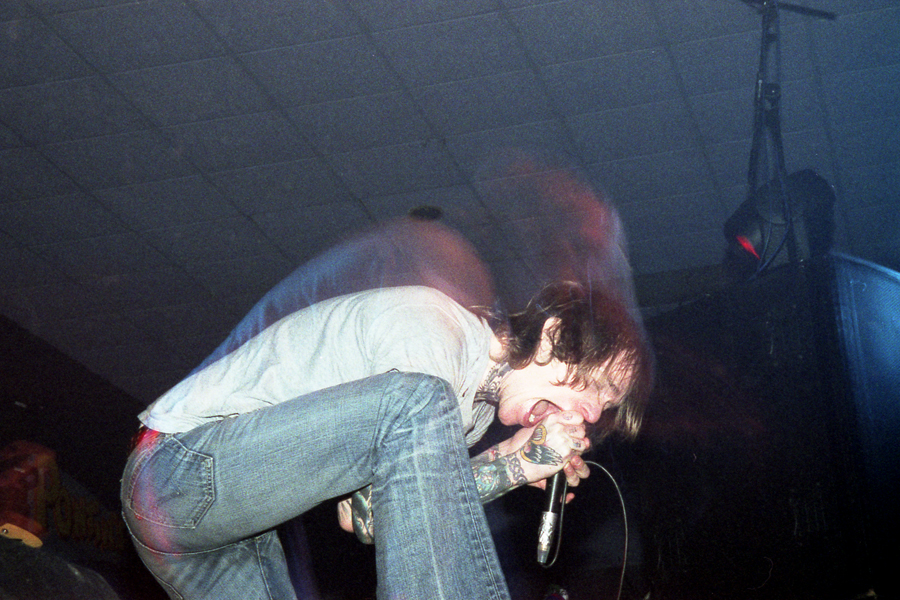
Bannon performing with Converge at All Tomorrow's Parties UK in 2004

== Discography ==
=== With Converge ===
- Halo in a Haystack (1994)
- Petitioning the Empty Sky (1996)
- When Forever Comes Crashing (1998)
- Jane Doe (2001)
- You Fail Me (2004)
- No Heroes (2006)
- Axe to Fall (2009)
- All We Love We Leave Behind (2012)
- The Dusk in Us (2017)
- Bloodmoon I (2021)
- Love Is Not Enough (2026)
- Hum of Hurt (2026)

=== With Supermachiner ===
- Rise of the Great Machine (2000)

=== As Wear Your Wounds ===
Studio albums

Year	Album details
2017	WYW: Released: April 7, 2017; Label: Deathwish
2017	Dunedevil: Released: May 19, 2017; Label: Deathwish
2019	Rust on the Gates of Heaven: Released: July 12, 2019; Label: Deathwish

EPs

Year	Album details
2012	Wear Your Wounds & Revelator Split: Released: November 16, 2012; Label: Self-released

Singles

Title	Year	Album
"Grant Me the Strength" (released under the name "Dear Lover")	2003	Non-album single
"The Blood of Thine Enemies" (released under the name "J.Bannon")	2008	Non-album single
"The Migration"	2013	Non-album single
"Goodbye Old Friend"	2017	WYW
"Arthritic Heart"	2017	Non-album single

=== With Blood from the Soul ===
- DSM-5 (2020)

=== With Umbra Vitae ===
- Shadow of Life (2020)
- Light of Death (2024)

== Art exhibitions ==
Bannon has various art/gallery appearances:

- 2004: Cleveland, OH, StrHess Festival
- 2008: Los Angeles, CA, Tradition Gallery/Store, "Public Domain"
- 2010: San Francisco, CA, 111 Minna Gallery, "Scream With Me"
- 2011: Beverly, MA, Ursa Major Gallery
- 2012: Cleveland, OH, Loren Naji Gallery, "Life & Death ..."
- 2012: Salt Lake City, UT, Fice Gallery, "Day of the Dead"
- 2012: Austin, TX, Mondo Gallery, "Universal Monsters"
- 2013: Boston, MA, Fourth Wall Project Gallery, "Street Diamonds 2"
- 2013: Austin, TX, Mondo Gallery, "EC Comics"
- 2014: Boston, MA, Distillery Gallery, "Skies, Water, & Death"
- 2014: Beverly, MA, Mingo Gallery, "Abstracts & Dimensions"
- 2015: Minneapolis, MN, Co-Exhibitions, "Fragments"
- 2015: Austin, TX, Fun Fun Fun Fest, "50/50.3 Project Loop"
- 2015: Tyler, TX, Preacher Gallery, "50/50.3 Project Loop Benefit"
- 2015: Austin, TX, Mondo Gallery, "Originals: No Pop Art Allowed"
- 2015: Los Angeles, CA, The Seventh Letter, "The Printed Works of BRLSQ"
- 2016: Chicago, IL, Revolution Brewing Co., "Art Gives Me Hope"
- 2016: Austin, TX, Mondo Gallery, "House Party"
- 2016: Montreal, QC, Neon St. Hubert, Solo art demo
- 2017: Tilburg, Holland, "Full Bleed"

== See also ==
- Category:Albums with cover art by Jacob Bannon
- List of vegetarians
