= Cave In discography =

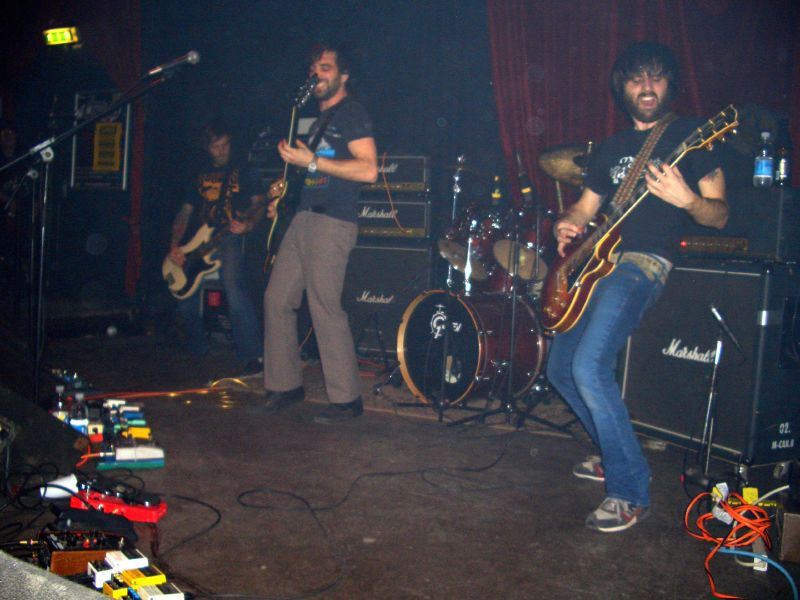
- Cave In performing at the Backstage Club in Munich, Germany on February 1, 2006
- Studio albums: 7
- Extended plays: 7
- Soundtrack albums: 8
- Live albums: 2
- Compilation albums: 3
- Singles: 3
- Music videos: 3
- Splits: 3

The discography of Cave In, an American rock band, consists of seven studio albums, two live albums, two compilation albums, seven EPs, three singles, three splits, eight compilation contributions and three music videos. Cave In formed in 1995 in Methuen, Massachusetts, where thereafter they began releasing several split singles and demos that eventually culminated in the 1998 compilation album Beyond Hypothermia. Cave In's first studio album, Until Your Heart Stops, was released later in 1998 through Hydra Head Records. These early releases from the band are often considered important albums in developing the metalcore genre. The band gradually began to move away from heavy metal and took a more alternative rock and progressive rock approach to their music beginning in 1999 with the EP Creative Eclipses. This new direction continued with Jupiter, Cave In's second studio album in 2000. Cave In released one more EP through Hydra Head Records in 2002, Tides of Tomorrow, before signing with RCA Records.

Cave In's signing with RCA Records proved to be the band's most commercially successful. In 2003, they released their third studio album, Antenna, which became their only album to chart on the Billboard 200, which peaked at number 169. The single "Anchor" off Antenna received some minor radio success, and ranked on the Billboard Alternative Songs chart at number 34. Cave In began working on demo tracks in 2004 that were more in the vein of the band's earlier heavy metal albums. The demos were presented to RCA, but the label refused to fund the recording of a full-length album of that style. Cave In was subsequently dropped from the label, but granted the rights to their new material. The band re-signed to Hydra Head Records, and released Perfect Pitch Black in 2005. One common lyrical theme found in many of the songs on Perfect Pitch Black was the band's feelings of frustration toward their stint on RCA. Perfect Pitch Black became the band's final release before going on an indefinite hiatus in 2006.

Cave In reformed in 2009 and continued releasing material. Their first new release was the EP Planets of Old which was originally made available at their reunion show. In 2010, Cave In started releasing albums in their Anomalies project consisting of previously unreleased or rare songs. The series began with Anomalies Vol. 2, which was a full recording of a 2003 live performance from Italy. This was followed by Anomalies, Vol. 1, a compilation of B-sides and other rarities. A new studio album titled White Silence was released in 2011.

== Albums ==
=== Studio albums ===
List of studio albums, with selected chart positions
Title	Album details	Peak chart positions			
Title	Album details	US	US Heat	US Indie	UK
Until Your Heart Stops	Released: May 29, 1998; Label: Hydra Head; Formats: CD, LP, CS, DL	—	—	—	—
Jupiter	Released: August 8, 2000; Label: Hydra Head; Formats: CD, LP, DL	—	—	—	—
Antenna	Released: March 18, 2003; Label: RCA, Hydra Head; Formats: CD, LP, DL	169	6	—	67
Perfect Pitch Black	Released: September 13, 2005; Label: Hydra Head; Formats: CD, LP, DL	—	—	—	—
White Silence	Released: May 24, 2011; Label: Hydra Head; Formats: CD, LP, DL	—	17	—	—
Final Transmission	Released: June 7, 2019; Label: Hydra Head; Formats: CD, LP, DL	—^{[A]}	3	15	—
Heavy Pendulum	Released: May 20, 2022; Label: Relapse; Formats: CD, LP, CS, DL	—	7	—	—
"—" denotes a recording that did not chart or was not released in that territory.

=== Compilations ===
Year	Album details	Notes
1998	Beyond Hypothermia: Released: February 1998; Label: Hydra Head (HH666-25)	A compilation of Cave In's early split singles (some of which featured re-recorded guitar and vocal parts) along with some new songs. Because it was the first full-length album by the band, Beyond Hypothermia was often confused for Cave In's first studio album.
2001	The Sacrifice Poles: Released: 2001; Label: Robodog Records	Studio demos and jams recorded during Jupiter sessions of 1998-2000. Released on CD in 2001, digital and vinyl 2014.
2010	Anomalies, Vol. 1: Released: December 14, 2010; Label: Hydra Head (HH666-201)	A compilation of B-sides, rarities and previously unreleased or hard to find tracks by Cave In.

=== Live albums ===
Year	Album details	Notes
2004	Live Airwaves: Released: April 2004; Label: Magic Bullet (MBL067)	Limited to 1,000 copies; sold exclusively at Cave In live shows and via mailorder. There were 34 copies numbered for Macrock 2004 attendees.
2010	Anomalies Vol. 2: Released: August 7, 2010; Label: Self-released	Anomalies Vol. 2 was recorded at Mazda Palace in Milan, Italy on October 27, 2003 while Cave In was touring internationally in support of Antenna. The self-released live album was originally made available in a limited edition CD format sold on tour with Boris and Russian Circles beginning on August 7, 2010.
2018	Live at Roadburn 2018: Released: November 2018; Label: Roadburn Records	While attributed to Cave In, this recording only features members Stephen Brodsky and Adam McGrath playing an acoustic set in tribute to their fallen bandmate Caleb Scofield.

=== Splits ===
Year	Album details	Notes
1996	Cave In / Gambit^{[B]}: Released: Early 1996; Label: Son of Sam; Split with: Gambit	Cave In's first release. Recorded with Brian McTernan at his Salad Days Studio in December 1995. Cave In contributed the song "Flypaper."
1996	Are We Still Fixable?^{[B]}: Released: Late 1996; Label: Independence Day (1); Split with: Early Grace	Recorded with Brian McTernan in April 1996 along with Cave In / Piebald. Cave In contributed the songs "Stoic" and "Mitigate."
1996	Cave In / Piebald^{[B]}: Released: Late 1996; Label: Moo Cow (21); Split with: Piebald	Recorded with Brian McTernan in April 1996 along with Are We Still Fixable?. Cave In contributed the song "Programmed Behind."
1999	In These Black Days Volume 5: Released: Late 1999; Label: Hydra Head (HH666-16); Split with: Botch	Cave In Contributed a cover of the Black Sabbath song "N.I.B."^{[E]}
2000	Cave In / Children: Released: Early 2000; Label: Overcome; Split with: Children	Features a remixed version of the song "Bottom Feeder" titled "Bottom Feeder (club mix)."

== EPs ==
Year	Album details	Notes
1997	Cave In^{[B]}: Released: May 1997; Label: Hydra Head (HH666-19)	Recorded with Brian McTernan at his Salad Days Studio in early 1997. Contained the tracks "Crossbearer" and "Chameleon." This is the final release with bassist Justin Matthes and vocalist Jay Frechette, and the first stand-alone release after several split and compilation appearances.
1999	Creative Eclipses: Released: Spring 1999; Label: Hydra Head (HH666-38)	"Although very much in the heavy metal mould the first Cave In album would provide the pivot for a complete overhaul in the acts sound with the follow-up EP Creative Eclipses dispensing with riffs and introducing folk and ambient sounds."
2000	Moons of Jupiter: Released: December 18, 2000; Label: Magic Bullet (MB011)	A four-song EP containing alternative versions of songs from Jupiter. It was limited to 3,300 copies, and sold exclusively during 2000–2001 tours. The remix of the song "Jupiter" was performed by Brian McTernan. Impressed with the way it turned out, Cave In expressed their interest in remixing all of Jupiter in this manner.
2002	Epicenter: Released: July 10, 2002; Label: BMG (28008)	A five-song EP containing tracks recorded during and after the Jupiter sessions. Some were later reworked into tracks on Antenna. This EP was originally exclusively released in Japan.
2002	Tides of Tomorrow: Released: October 15, 2002; Label: Hydra Head (HH666-66)	Tides of Tomorrow was a continuation of the new sound Cave In displayed with Jupiter, and was also noted for its use of acoustic guitar in addition to electric instruments. The EP was released through Hydra Head after it had been announced that Cave In signed to RCA Records. It peaked at number 3 on the UK Top 50 Budget Albums.
2003	untitled EP^{[D]}: Released: August 2003; Label: Self-released	Sometimes referred to as Bootleg EP or Lollapalooza EP, the untitled EP was given out for free during live shows in 2003 beginning with their Lollapalooza performance. Two of the songs, "Down the Drain" and "Droned" were later included on the band's fourth studio album, Perfect Pitch Black. Cave In's cover of Codeine's "Cave-In" from this EP was released on Japanese versions of Perfect Pitch Black, and later on Anomalies Vol. 1.
2009	Planets of Old: Released: July 19, 2009; Label: Hydra Head (HH666-184)	Cave In's first release after reforming in 2009. Planets of Old was originally released at Cave In's reunion show on July 19, 2009 as a vinyl LP. The EP was later reissued in 2010 on CD with a bonus DVD of their reunion performance.
2013	untitled EP: January 2013; Label: Coextinction (13)	Sometimes referred to as Coextinction Release 13, the digital-only EP features the demo versions "Dark Driving" from Tides of Tomorrow, and "Joy Opposites" and "Anchor" from Antenna. The tracks were recorded in 2002 while touring with Foo Fighters in Europe. All proceeds from the EP were donated towards rebuilding Translator Audio, a recording studio from Brooklyn, New York that was destroyed by Hurricane Sandy. Cave In recorded some songs from Perfect Pitch Black at Translator Audio.

== Songs ==
=== Singles ===
Year	Single details	Notes
2001	"Lost in the Air"^{[C]}: Released: October 2001; Label: Hydra Head (HH666-49)	Contains "Lift Off" on the B-side. Cave In recorded the two tracks after touring with A Perfect Circle in 2001, and released them on a 7" vinyl in October of that year. The song was later re-recorded for Antenna.
2003	"Anchor": Released: May 24, 2003; Label: RCA (522982, 522992)	Cave In's first song, and only to date, to chart as a radio single. The song peaked on Billboard's Alternative Songs at number 34 and on the UK Singles Chart at number 53. It was originally released on their 2003 album Antenna. Version 1 has the B-sides "Minus World," "Devil's Pinata Head," and the "Anchor" music video. Version 2 has "Lift Off" and "Stained Silver" (live).
2005	"Shapeshifter/Dead Already": Released: November 27, 2005; Label: Hydra Head (HH666-109)	In 2005, members of Cave In collaborated with Converge drummer Ben Koller. Two songs, "Shapeshifter" and "Dead Already," were recorded and released on a limited edition cassette single that was sold during 2005–2006 tours.

=== Other appearances ===
The following Cave In songs were released on compilation albums, soundtracks, and other releases. This is not an exhaustive list; songs that were first released on the band's albums, EPs, and split releases are not included.

Year	Appeared on	Contributed song
1997	Between a Rock and a Hard Place: Released: Mid 1997; Label: Witching Hour (WHR 002)	"Pivotal"^{[B]}
1999	Metal Is a Tough Business: Released: February 1999; Label: Hot Sauce	"Until Your Heart Stops" (demo)
1999	Flowercore: Released: Summer 1999; Label: Hot Sauce	"Juggernaut" (demo)
1999	Never Give In: A Tribute to Bad Brains: Released: August 24, 1999; Label: Century Media (7977)	"I Luv I Jah" (originally by Bad Brains)^{[E]}
2000	Disintegrated: A Tribute to The Cure: Released: August 24, 2000; Label: Too Damn Hype (38)	"Plainsong" (originally by The Cure)^{[E]}
2002	Plea for Peace/Take Action, Vol. 2: Released: August 20, 2002; Label: Sub City (22)	"Devil's Head Pinata"
2003	Buddyhead Presents: Gimme Skelter: Released: October 21, 2003; Label: Nettwerk (30321)	"Harmless Armless / Minus World"
2004	Ripped: Released: March 6, 2004; Label: Kerrang! (KERMRH04)	"Dazed & Confused" (originally by Led Zeppelin)
2007	Plea for Peace, Vol. 2: Released: April 24, 2007; Label: Asian Man (148)	"Dead Already" (live)
2015	Whatever Nevermind: Released: April 18, 2015; Label: Robotic Empire	"Breed" (originally by Nirvana)

== Music videos ==
Year	Song	Director	Album
2003	"Anchor"	Dean Karr	Antenna
2004	"Inspire"	Gavin Bowden	Antenna
2004	"Dark Driving"	—^{[D]}	Tides of Tomorrow
2022	"New Reality"	Michael Gilday	Heavy Pendulum
2022	"Blinded by a Blaze"	—^{[F]}	Heavy Pendulum
2022	"Blood Spiller"	Jordan Olds and Drew Kaufman	Heavy Pendulum
2022	"Reckoning"	Jay Zucco	Heavy Pendulum

== Notes ==
- A Final Transmission did not enter the Billboard 200, but peaked at no. 84 on the Top Album Sales chart.
- B Denotes a release that was later added to the compilation album Beyond Hypothermia.
- C The "Lost in the Air" single is sometimes inversely referred to as the "Lift Off" single with "Lost in the Air" as a B-side.
- D The music video for "Dark Driving" features clips of live performances, and thus had no director. It was released two years after its derivative album, Tides of Tomorrow, on the bonus DVD packaged with special editions of Antenna.
- E Denotes a song, or a release containing a song, that was later added to the compilation album Anomalies Vol. 1.
- F The music video for "Blinded by a Blaze" features clips of a live performance at the Saint Vitus Bar in Brooklyn that was shot and edited by Frank Huang. The video contains additional footage that was shot in Massachusetts by Cave In along with test LP shots by Drew Juergens.
