= Hydra Head Records discography =

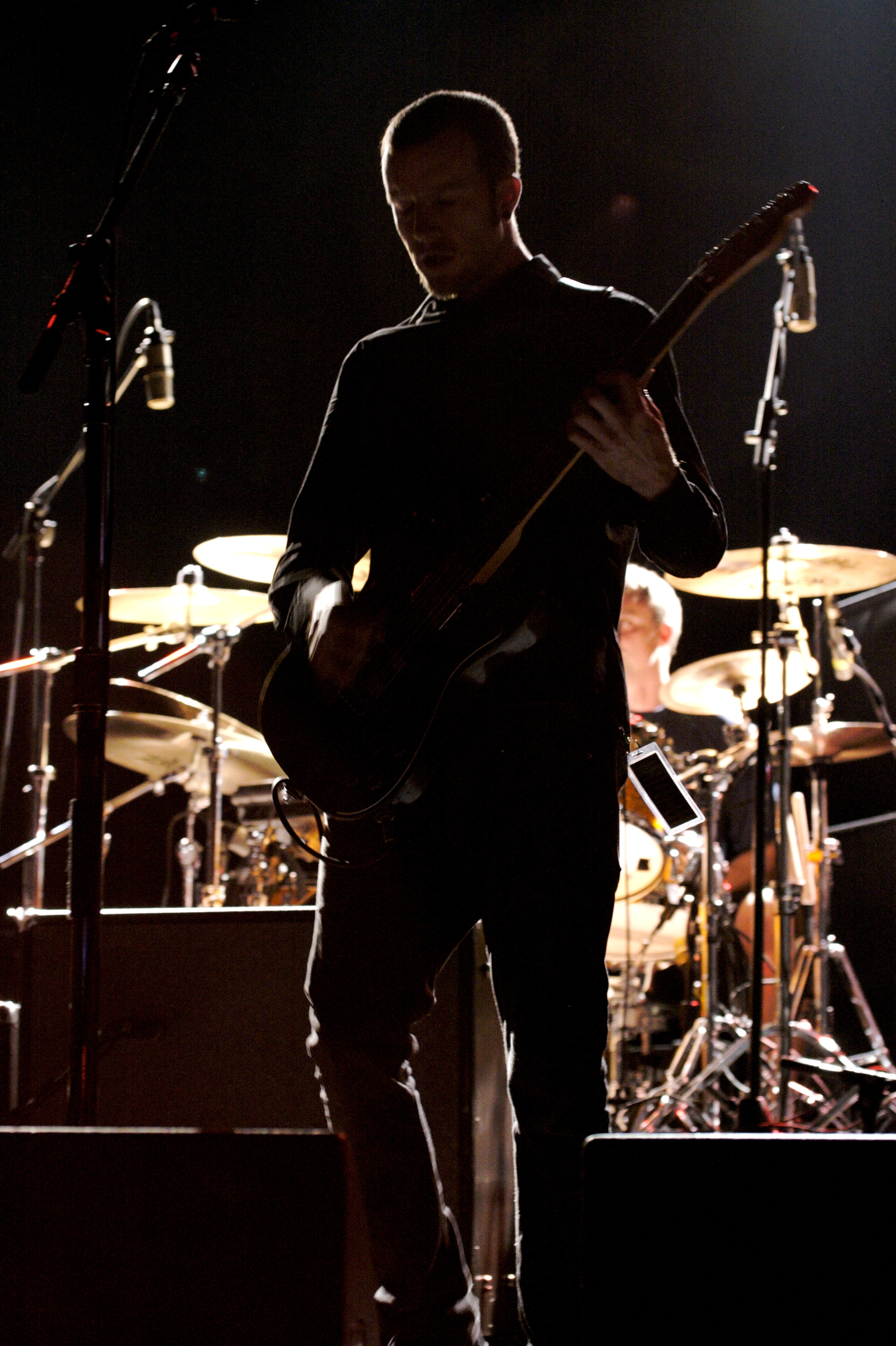
Aaron Turner, the founder of Hydra Head, performing live.

This is a complete discography of Hydra Head Records releases. Hydra Head Records was an independent record company based in Los Angeles, California, founded in 1993 by Aaron Turner. It had two imprints, Hydra Head Noise Industries, which specialises in experimental and noise music, and another entitled Tortuga Recordings.

Hydra Head was founded in 1993 as a distribution company while Turner was still in high school. In 1995, he moved to Boston to attend art school, when he was handed a Vent demo, whose seven-inch would be the first record released on Hydra Head. The label grew to accommodate local bands such as Roswell, Corrin, Piebald and Converge, and after Turner graduated from college in 1999, it became a full-time endeavour. In late 2012, Turner announced that Hydra Head's operation would begin winding down; the label intended to continue distributing old material, but not taking on any new releases. The label folded in 2020, with the label's album rights being returned to their artists, but has been selling its remaining stock from its warehouses.

Bands such as Cave In, Pelican, Isis, Botch and Converge have released records on Hydra Head. Hydra Head often collaborates with other labels, such as Relapse Records and Southern Records, in releasing vinyl editions.

== List of Hydra Head Records releases ==
Releases are numbered in a roughly chronological order; semi-official releases are often appended with a ".5" designation.

Cat #	Artist	Title	Format	Year
HH666-01	Vent	Long Lost Human	7-inch	1995
HH666-02	Corrin	Despair Rides on Angel Wings	7-inch	1995
HH666-02.5	Unionsuit	Demo	MC	1996
HH666-03	Roswell	Roswell	7-inch	1997
HH666-04	Piebald	Even After Thirteen Years, He's Still Not Coming Back	7-inch	1996
HH666-05	The Boxer Rebellion	The Boxer Rebellion	7-inch	1997
HH666-06	Age of Reason	Age of Reason	7-inch	1997
HH666-07	Converge	Caring and Killing	CD	1997
HH666-07	Converge	Caring and Killing [white album cover]	CD	1997
HH666-08 (Note: HH666-008 was originally planned as a compilation album, but it was never released. The catalog number remained unused for two decades until the 2018 reissue of Isis' Mosquito Control.)	Isis	Mosquito Control (reissue)	LP	2018
HH666-09	Miltown	Miltown	7-inch	1997
HH666-10	Six Going On Seven	Six Going On Seven	7-inch	1997
HH666-11	The Boxer Rebellion	The Romance of Aeronautics	LP	1997
HH666-12	Anal Cunt / EyeHateGod	In These Black Days: Vol. 1	7-inch	1997
HH666-13	Converge / Brutal Truth	In These Black Days: Vol. 2	7-inch	1997
HH666-14	Coalesce / Today is the Day	In These Black Days: Vol. 3	7-inch	1997
HH666-15	Cavity / Cable / Jesuit / Overcast	In These Black Days: Vol. 4	7-inch	1997
HH666-16	Cave In / Botch	In These Black Days: Vol. 5	7-inch	1999
HH666-17	Neurosis / Soilent Green	In These Black Days: Vol. 6	7-inch	1999
HH666-18	Various artists	In These Black Days	7×7-inch box set	2013
HH666-19	Cave In	Cave In	7-inch	1997
HH666-20	Piebald	When Life Hands You Lemons	LP/CD	1997
HH666-21	Today is the Day	Today is the Day	7-inch	1997
HH666-22	The Huguenots / SevenPercentSolution	Split	10-inch	2000
HH666-23	Drowningman	"Weighted and Weighed Down"	7-inch	1997
HH666-24	The Hollomen	The Hollomen	7-inch	1997
HH666-25	Cave In	Beyond Hypothermia	LP/CD	1998
HH666-26	Cable	Gutter Queen	LP/CD	1999
HH666-27	Miltown	Miltown	CD	1997
HH666-27.5	Isis	Demo 98	Cassette	1998
HH666-28	Drowningman	Busy Signal at the Suicide Hotline	LP/CD	1998
HH666-29	Botch	American Nervoso	LP/CD	1999
HH666-30	Coalesce / boysetsfire	Split	7-inch/CD-EP	2000
HH666-31	Cave In	Until Your Heart Stops	2×LP/CD	1998
HH666-32	Jesuit	Jesuit	7-inch	1999
HH666-33	The Never Never	These Ain't No Purple Hearts	LP	1998
HH666-34	Soilent Green	Sewn Mouth Secrets	2×LP/7"	1998
HH666-35	Coalesce	There is Nothing New Under the Sun	LP/CD	1999
HH666-36	Agoraphobic Nosebleed	PCP Torpedo	6"/2×CD	1998
HH666-36.5	Various artists	Winter/Spring Sampler Vol.1	CD	
HH666-37	The Dillinger Escape Plan / Drowningman	Split	7-inch	1999
HH666-38	Cave In	Creative Eclipses	7-inch/CD-EP	1999
HH666-39	Keelhaul	Ornamental Iron	7-inch	2000
HH666-40	Cattlepress	Hordes to Abolish the Divine	LP/CD	2000
HH666-41	Botch	We Are the Romans	2×LP/CD	2000
HH666-41.5	Isis	Sawblade	CD-EP	1999
HH666-42	Coalesce	0:12 Revolution in Just Listening	LP	1999
HH666-43	The Dillinger Escape Plan	Calculating Infinity	LP	1999
HH666-44	Buzzov*en	Revelation: Sick Again	LP/CD	2011
HH666-45	Goatsnake / Burning Witch	Split	CD	2000
HH666-46	Agoraphobic Nosebleed / Converge	The Poacher Diaries	12-inch	2000
HH666-47	Cavity	On the Lam	Pic-LP/CD	2001
HH666-48	Kid Kilowatt	Guitar Method	CD	2004
HH666-49	Cave In	"Lift Off"	7-inch (single)	2002
HH666-50	Discordance Axis	The Inalienable Dreamless	LP/CD	2000
HH666-51	Knut	Bastardiser	CD	2001
HH666-52	Cave In	Jupiter	LP/CD	2000
HH666-52.5	Various artists	Summer/Fall Sampler Vol.2	CD	
HH666-53	Stephen Brodsky	Static Intellect	LP/CD	2002
HH666-54	Harkonen	Grizz	7-inch/CD-EP	2001
HH666-55	Barbaro	"Feeding"	7-inch	2001
HH666-56	Cable	Northern Failures	CD	2001
HH666-57	Cult of Luna	Cult of Luna [EP]	7-inch	2002
HH666-58	Keelhaul	Keelhaul II	CD	2001
HH666-59	Isis	Celestial	CD	2000
HH666-60	Neurosis	Sovereign	LP	2000
HH666-61	Knut	Knut	CD-EP	2001
HH666-62	Knut	Challenger	CD	2002
HH666-63	Botch	An Anthology of Dead Ends	10-inch/CD-EP	2002
HH666-64	Harkonen	Shake Harder Boy	CD	2002
HH666-65	Craw	Bodies for Strontium 90	CD	2002
HH666-66	Cave In	Tides of Tomorrow	12-inch/CD-EP	2002
HH666-67	The Austerity Program	Terra Nova	CD-EP	2002
HH666-68	Pelican	Pelican	CD-EP	2003
HH666-69	Discordance Axis	Pikadourei	DVD	2002
HH666-70	Cave In	Antenna	2×LP	2003
HH666-71	Discordance Axis	Original Sound Version 92-95	CD	2003
HH666-72	Discordance Axis	Jouhou	CD	2004
HH666-73	Cavity	Supercollider	CD	2003
HH666-74	Various artists (Note: Pelican, Scissorfight and The Austerity Program each contribute a track.)	The Champions of Sound 2003	7-inch	2003
HH666-75	Pelican	Australasia	2×LP/CD	2003
HH666-76	Keelhaul	Subject to Change Without Notice	CD	2003
HH666-77	27	Let the Light in	CD-EP	2004
HH666-78	Harkonen / These Arms Are Snakes	Like a Virgin	CD-EP	2005
HH666-79	Jesu	Jesu	CD	2004
HH666-79	Jesu	Jesu [re-release]	2×LP	2011
HH666-80	Mare	Mare	CD-EP	2004
HH666-81	Discordance Axis	Our Last Day	CD	2005
HH666-82	Big Business	Head for the Shallow	CD	2005
HH666-83	Isis	Oceanic: Remixes and Reinterpretations	2×CD	2004
HH666-84	Pelican	March into the Sea	CD-EP	2005
HH666-85	Pelican	Live in Chicago 6.11.03	DVD	2005
HH666-86	Botch	061502	DVD	2006
HH666-87	Khanate	Capture & Release	LP/CD	2005
HH666-88	Knut	Alter	CD	2006
HH666-89	Oxbow	Love That's Last	CD+DVD	2006
HH666-90	Everlovely Lightningheart	Cusp	CD	2006
HH666-91	Pelican	The Fire in Our Throats Will Beckon the Thaw	CD	2005
HH666-92	Boris With Merzbow	Sun Baked Snow Cave	CD	2005
HH666-93	Sunn O)))	The Grimmrobe Demos	CD	1999
HH666-94	Sunn O)))	ØØ Void	CD	2000
HH666-95	Merzbow	Dharma	CD	2001
HH666-96	Lotus Eaters	Alienist on a Pale Horse	LP	2001
HH666-97	Phantomsmasher	Phantomsmasher	CD	2001
HH666-99	2XH Vs HHR Vol. 1 (Note: Includes tracks from Kid606, Final, Shifts, Stephen O'Malley, Craig Dongoski, Tribes of Neurot, Merzbow, Monotonos, Jan Michael Vincent Car Crash, Orthrelm, The Austerity Program, Khanate, The Abandoned Hearts Club, Gezoleen and Phantomsmasher.)	Where Is My Robotic Boot?	2×CD	2004
HH666-100	Botch	Complete Works Box Set	9×LP	2016
HH666-101	House of Low Culture	Live from the House of Low Temperature!	LP	2004
HH666-102	Boris / Merzbow	Walrus/Groon	12-inch	2007
HH666-103	Cave In	Perfect Pitch Black	CD	2005
HH666-104	Pelican / Mono	Split	LP	2005
HH666-105	Logh	A Sunset Panorama	CD	2005
HH666-106	Khanate	Dead & Live Aktions	DVD	2005
HH666-107	Knut	Terraformer	CD	2005
HH666-108	Cave In	Jupiter + Anomilies Vol. 3	2×LP	2014
HH666-109	Cave In	"Shapeshifter / Dead Already"	Cassette single	2006
HH666-110	Jesu	Silver	CD-EP	2006
HH666-111	Daughters	Hell Songs	CD/LP	2006
HH666-112	Oxbow	The Narcotic Story	CD	2007
HH666-113	Pelican	Pink Mammoth	10-inch	2007
HH666-114	Khlyst	Chaos Is My Name	CD	2006
HH666-115	Xasthur	Subliminal Genocide	CD	2006
HH666-116	Stephen Brodsky	Octave Museum	CD	2006
HH666-117	The Huguenots	Discography	CD	2007
HH666-118	Botch	Unifying Themes Redux [reissue]	CD	2006
HH666-119	Heresi	Psalm II - Infusco Ignis	CD	2006
HH666-120	Gridlink	Amber Gray	CD	2008
HH666-121	Big Business	Here Come the Waterworks	CD	2007
HH666-122	Dälek	Deadverse Massive, Volume 1: Dälek Rarities 1999-2006	CD	2007
HH666-123	Lustmord	Juggernaut	Limited CD	2007
HH666-124	Pelican	City of Echoes	CD	2007
HH666-125	Zozobra	Harmonic Tremors	CD	2007
HH666-126	Jesu	Conqueror	CD	2007
HH666-127	Jesu	Lifeline	CD-EP	2007
HH666-128	Drawing Voices	Drawing Voices	CD	2007
HH666-129	Botch	American Nervoso [reissue]	CD	2007
HH666-130	Xasthur	Defective Epitaph	CD	2007
HH666-131	Clouds	Legendary Demo	CD	2007
HH666-132	Bergraven	Dödsvisioner	CD	2007
HH666-133	Everlovely Lightningheart	Sien Weal Tallion Rue	2×LP (Note: A CD-R version was also released in limited quantities, with the catalogue number HH666-133-2.)	2009
HH666-134	The Austerity Program	Black Madonna	CD	2007
HH666-135	Coalesce	There is Nothing New Under the Sun [reissue]	CD	2007
HH666-136	Jesu / Eluvium	Split	LP	2007
HH666-137	Kayo Dot	Blue Lambency Downward	CD	2008
HH666-138	Pet Genius	Pet Genius	CD	2007
HH666-139	Melvins	(A) Senile Animal	4×LP	2008
HH666-140	Clouds	We Are Above You	CD	2008
HH666-141	Botch	We Are the Romans [reissue]	2×CD	2007
HH666-142	Hayaino Daisuki	Headbanger's Karaoke Club Dangerous Fire	CD	2008
HH666-143	Everlovely Lightningheart	Particles and Fields	CD	2007
HH666-144	Ocrilim	Annwn	CD	2008
HH666-145	Old Man Gloom	Meditations in B	LP	2008
HH666-146	Helms Alee	Lionize/Truly	7-inch	2008
HH666-147	Everlovely Lightningheart/Oakeater	Split	CDr	2007
HH666-148	Cavity	Laid Insignificant [reissue]	CD	2008
HH666-149	Pet Genius	Elvis Unreleased	CD	2007
HH666-150	Xasthur	A Gate Through Bloodstained Mirrors [reissue]	2×CD	2008
HH666-151	Oxbow	Fuckfest/ 12 Galaxies	CD	2008
HH666-152	Torche	Meanderthal	CD	2008
HH666-153	Eugene S. Robinson	Fight	2×CD	2008
HH666-154	Pyramids	Pyramids	2×CD	2008
HH666-155	Helms Alee	Night Terror	CD	2008
HH666-156	Zozobra	Bird of Prey	CD	2008
HH666-157	Lustmord	O T H E R	CD	2008
HH666-158	The VSS	Nervous Circuits [reissue]	CD+DVD	2008
HH666-159	Harvey Milk	Life... The Best Game in Town	CD	2008
HH666-160	Khanate	Khanate [reissue]	2×LP	2001/2015
HH666-161	Nihill	Krach [reissue] (Note: Krach was originally released by Monumentum Records in 2007.)	CD	2009
HH666-162	Nihill	Grond	CD/2×LP	2009
HH666-163	Nihill	Verdonkermann	CD/2×LP	2013
HH666-164	Khanate	Things Viral [reissue]	2×LP	2003/2015
HH666-165	Stove Bredsky	The Black Ribbon Award	CD	2008
HH666-166	The Austerity Program	Song 20 (The River)	7-inch	2008
HH666-167	Clouds	Feed the Horse	CD single	2008
HH666-168	Oxbow	Fuckfest/12 Galaxies	2×CD	2008
HH666-169	Envy / Jesu	Split	CD	2009
HH666-170	Oxbow	12 Galaxies	CD	2008
HH666-171	Mamiffer	Hirror Enniffer	CD	2008
HH666-172	Bergraven	Till Makabert Väsen	CD	2009
HH666-173	Khanate	Clean Hands Go Foul	CD	2009
HH666-174	Pelican / These Arms Are Snakes	Split	10-inch/CD	2008
HH666-175	Big Business	Mind the Drift	CD	2009
HH666-176	Xasthur	All Reflections Drained	2×CD/2×LP	2009
HH666-177	Hayaino Diasuki	The Invincible Gate Mind of the Infernal Fire Hell	EP	2010
Hh666-178	Torche	Healer / Across the Shields	12-inch/DVD	2009
HH666-179	Steve Brodsky	A Shoebox Tuneful (aka Thing or Thong Rider)	CDep	2008
HH666-180	Various artists (Note: Pelican, Kayo Dot, Stove Bredsky and Zozobra each contribute a track.)	Champions of Sound 2008	2×7″	2009
HH666-181	Harvey Milk	Harvey Milk [reissue]	2×LP	2010
HH666-183-1	Clouds	B Chuggas May Be Logging	12-inch	2011
HH666-184	Cave In	Planets of Old	12-inch EP	2009
HH666-185	Keelhaul	Keelhaul's Triumphant Return to Obscurity	2×LP/CD	2009
HH666-186	Torche / Boris	Chapter Ahead Being Fake	10-inch	2010
HH666-187	Greymachine	"Vultures Descend"	12-inch (Note: A cassette version was also released, with the catalogue number HH666-187-5.)	2009
HH666-188	Greymachine	Disconnected	LP/CD	2009
HH666-189	Lustmord	[T R A N S M U T E D]	LP	2009
HH666-190	Big Business	Biz Bot Remixes	12-inch	2009
HH666-191	Jodis	Secret House	CD	2009
HH666-192	Bohren & Der Club of Gore	Dolores	2×LP	2009
HH666-193	Old Man Gloom	Christmas (reissue)	2×LP	2012
HH666-194	Pyramids with Nadja	Pyramids with Nadja	CD	2009
HH666-195	Daughters	Daughters	CD/LP	2010
HH666-196	Oxbow	Songs for the French	LP	2009
HH666-197	Jesu	Heart Ache & Dethroned [reissue]	CD×2	2010
HH666-198	Kayo Dot	Coyote	CD	2010
HH666-199	Daughters	"The First Supper"	7-inch single	2010
HH666-201	Cave In	Anomalies, Vol. 1	LP	2010
HH666-203	Various artists (Note: Tracks by Oxbow, Daughters, Pyramids with Nadja, Hayaino Daisuki, Torche, Harvey Milk, Jodis, Nihill, Cave In, Kayo Dot, Keelhaul, Clouds, Xasthur, Pet Genius, GREYMACHINE, Zozobra, Big Business, Bergraven and The Austerity Program.)	Songs From the Hydra Head Hype Machine Volume 1...	Cassette	2009
HH666-204	The Austerity Program	Backsliders and Apostates Will Burn	12-inch/CD-EP/DVD-R	2010
HH666-205	Xasthur	2005 Demo	CD	2010
HH666-206	Harvey Milk	A Small Turn of Human Kindness	CD/LP	2010
HH666-207	Torche	Songs for Singles	CD-EP	2010
HH666-208	Pyramids with Nadja	Into the Silent Waves (Remixes)	12-inch	2010
HH666-209	Stephen Brodsky	Here's to the Future	Cassette	2010
HH666-210	Gridlink	Orphan	CD	2011
HH666-211	Knut	Wonder	CD	2010
HH666-212	Jodis	Black Curtain	LP/CD	2012
HH666-213	Kayo Dot	Stained Glass	CD-EP	2010
HH666-214	Isis / Melvins	Split	12-inch	2010
HH666-215	Pharaoh Overlord	Pharaoh Overlord 1 (reissue)	2×LP	2016
HH666-216	Helms Alee	Weatherhead	2×12"	2011
HH666-217	Mamiffer/Pyramids	Split	LP	2012
HH666-218	Cave In	White Silence	CD	2011
HH666-219	Prurient	Many Jewels Surround the Crown	7-inch	2011
HH666-220	Prurient	Bermuda Drain	Cassette/CD/LP	2011
HH666-221	Oxbow	King of the Jews [reissue]	CD/LP	2011
HH666-222	Cave In	Live at Club Soda	Cassette	2015
HH666-223	Black Face	"I Want to Kill You / Monster"	7-inch EP	2011
HH666-224	Isis	The Red Sea (reissue)	LP	2018
HH666-225	Pharaoh Overlord	Zero	LP	2018
HH666-226	Cave In	Until Your Heart Stops Demos	Cassette	2018
HH666-227	Zozobra	Unreleased Tracks	Cassette	2018
HH666-228	Oxbow	Thin Black Duke	LP/CD	2017
HH666-229	Pyramids/Horseback	A Throne Without a King	LP+7"/CD/Cassette	2012
HH666-230	Mamiffer / Demian Johnston	"Dead Settlers / Kallikantzaros"	Cassette (Note: Limited to 110 copies.)	2011
HH666-231	Prurient	Time's Arrow	12-inch/MCD/Cassette	2011
HH666-232	Oxbow	: stone & towering edifice : LIVE at the BAM	CD-R	2011
HH666-235	Old Man Gloom	NO	2×LP/CD/Cassette	2012
HH666-236	JK Flesh/Prurient	Worship is the Cleansing of the Imagination	12-inch	2012
HH666-238	Split Cranium	"Sceptres to Rust"	7-inch	2012
HH666-239	Split Cranium	Split Cranium	LP/CD	2012
HH666-240	Circle (band)	Manner	LP	2012
HH666-241	Godflesh	Decline & Fall	Cassette	2014
HH666-242	Godflesh	A World Lit Only by Fire	Cassette	2014
HH666-243	Endon	MAMA	LP	2015
HH666-244	Erosion	Maximum Suffering	LP	2018
HH666-245	Cave In	Final Transmission	LP/CD/Cassette	2019
HH666-666	Oxbow	oxbow in camera	DVD-R	2012

== List of Hydra Head Noise Industries releases ==
Cat #	Artist	Title	Format	Year
2XH-001	Sunn O)))	The Grimmrobe Demos	CD	1999
2XH-002	Sunn O)))	ØØ Void	CD	2000
2XH-003	Merzbow	Dharma	CD	2001
2XH-004	Lotus Eaters	Alienist on a Pale Horse	12-inch	2001
2XH-005	Phantomsmasher	Phantomsmasher	CD	2001
2XH-006	Phantomsmasher/Venetian Snares	Podsjfkj Pojid Poa	7-inch	2003
2XH-007	2XH Vs HHR Vol. 1	Where Is My Robotic Boot?	2×CD	2004
2XH-008	Boris/Merzbow	Walrus/Groon	12-inch	2007
2XH-009	House of Low Culture	Live from The House of Low Temperature!	LP	2004
2XH-010	Everlovely Lightningheart	Cusp	CD	2006
2XH-011	Boris/Merzbow	Sun Baked Snow Cave	CD	2005
2XH-012	Agoraphobic Nosebleed	PCP Torpedo/ANbRx	CD	2006
2XH-013	Knut	Alter	CD	2006
2XH-014	Drawing Voices	Drawing Voices	CD	2006
