= Anomalies, Vol. 1 =

Compilation album by Cave In
- Released: December 14, 2010
- Genres: Metalcore; progressive rock; space rock
- Length: 38:37
- Label: Hydra Head (HH666–201)
- Producers: Brian McTernan; Kurt Ballou; Andrew Schneider

Cave In chronology
Anomalies, Vol. 2 (2010)	Anomalies, Vol. 1 (2010)	White Silence (2011)

Professional ratings
Review scores
Source	Rating
Punknews.org	3/5 stars

Anomalies, Vol. 1 is a compilation album by the American rock band Cave In. The album was officially released on December 14, 2010, through Hydra Head Records, however copies could be obtained one month earlier on Black Friday. Despite its title, Anomalies, Vol. 1 is actually the second release in Cave In's Anomalies series, which a grouping of releases that compile previously unreleased or rare tracks. Released earlier in 2010, Anomalies, Vol. 2 was a live album of a recorded performance from 2003.

== Song history ==
The opening track from Anomalies, Vol. 1, "Mr. Co-Dexterity," was originally released on Japanese editions of Cave In's 1998 debut album Until Your Heart Stops. After making the conscious decision not to play heavy metal music anymore in the late 1990s, after the release of Until Your Heart Stops, Cave In started recording material that was more spacey and alternative that eventually culminated in the Creative Eclipses EP. The song "Inflatable Dream" was a previously unreleased track from these sessions. The studio version of "Innuendo and Out the Other" was originally released on 2000s Jupiter.

Anomalies, Vol. 1 also contains four cover songs. The Cave In track "I Luv I Jah" was originally released in 1999 on Never Give In: A Tribute to Bad Brains. It was written by the hardcore punk band Bad Brains and released on their 1982 album Bad Brains. The song "Plainsong" was originally released in 2000 on Disintegrated: A Tribute to The Cure. It was written by the gothic rock band The Cure for their 1989 album Disintegration. The song "N.I.B." was originally released on in 1999 In These Black Days. It was written by the heavy metal band Black Sabbath for their 1970 album Black Sabbath. Anomalies, Vol. 1 ends with a cover of the slowcore band Codeine's song "Cave-In," written for their 1990 album Frigid Stars. The song was originally released on Cave In's Lollapalooza EP and Japanese editions of Perfect Pitch Black. This song's title was also the source of inspiration for Cave In's band name.

== Track listing ==
No.	Title	Writer(s)	Length
1.	"Mr. Co-Dexterity"	Stephen Brodsky, Adam McGrath, Caleb Scofield, John-Robert Conners	6:43
2.	"Inflatable Dream"	Brodsky, McGrath, Scofield, Conners	6:09
3.	"I Luv I Jah" (Bad Brains cover)	Paul Hudson, Gary Miller, Darryl Jenifer, Earl Hudson	9:01
4.	"Plainsong" (The Cure cover)	Robert Smith, Simon Gallup, Roger O'Donnell, Porl Thompson, Boris Williams	3:50
5.	"N.I.B." (Black Sabbath cover)	Geezer Butler, Tony Iommi, Ozzy Osbourne, Bill Ward	4:17
6.	"Innuendo and Out the Other" (Demo)	Brodsky, McGrath, Scofield, Conners	4:35
7.	"Cave-In" (Codeine cover)	Stephen Immerwahr, John Engle, Chris Brokaw	4:02
Total length:			38:37

On the vinyl edition, the first three tracks make up side A while the remaining tracks are on side B.

== Personnel ==
Cave In

- Stephen Brodsky – vocals, guitar
- Adam McGrath – guitar
- Caleb Scofield – bass, vocals
- John-Robert Conners – drums

Production

- Tracks 1–3 produced by Brian McTernan
- Tracks 4–6 produced by Kurt Ballou
- Track 7 produced by Andrew Schneider
