= Guitar Method =

Studio album by Kid Kilowatt
- Released: March 9, 2004
- Recorded: 1996–1999, GodCity Studios
- Genre: Indie rock; post-hardcore
- Length: 55:09
- Label: Second Nature (vinyl) (SN020); Hydra Head Records (CD) (HH666-48)
- Producer: Kurt Ballou

Guitar Method (subtitled 1996–1999) is the only album by indie supergroup Kid Kilowatt, initially released by Second Nature Recordings on vinyl in 2003, and later on CD by Hydra Head Records in 2004. It consists of material recorded over a period of three years, including after the band's breakup. Still, it did not see release as a whole for over four years after the last track was recorded.

Kid Kilowatt was formed by members of Cave In and Converge as a side project; sessions together were sporadic and rare, and the process of writing, recording and release took seven years in all. Reviewers praised the band's musicianship and the depth and range of the sound; one "much mellower" than that of the members' main projects.

== Context and recording ==
Kid Kilowatt was initially created as 'Ester of Wood Rosin' by Cave In's Stephen Brodsky in August 1996, "inspired by [his] love for Giants Chair and [his] need for an alter-ego to Cave In". Other influences upon Kid Kilowatt's sound, as stated by Brodksy, included Sunny Day Real Estate and "early" Promise Ring. Brodsky recruited Adam McGrath, also of Cave In, on bass guitar, along with local drummer Matt Redmond and Piebald guitarist and vocalist Aaron Stuart. Brodsky took the role of guitarist and lead vocalist, and with this line-up they, in the words of Brodsky, "began to formulate some good ol' sappy-but-not-too-sappy rock n' roll tunes".

The first material destined for Guitar Method was written within the initial few months, including "Teg Nugent" and "the original, 9 minute long opus version" of "Tug of War". In Autumn 1996, they recorded a four-song demo with Kurt Ballou at his 8-track home studio, GodCity. Brodsky hand-crafted the demo inserts in his high school graphic arts room, with around 400 copies pressed. According to Brodsky, they were "gone in no time". In Spring 1997, Aaron Stuart left the band in order to concentrate on his primary project, Piebald. Ballou, of Converge, who had recorded and produced their prior four track demo, joined the band in his stead, and they renamed the band "Kid Kilowatt", inspired by a Guided by Voices song entitled "Cool Off Kid Kilowatt" from their 1993 album Vampire on Titus.

Now with Ballou as a full-time member, the band re-developed songs written with Stuart, including "The Bicycle Song", "7th Inning Song Formation", "The Scope", "Peeping Tomboy" and "Red Carpet". They resumed writing fresh material with "Radio Pow for Now". In their first show as Kid Kilowatt, they performed with Brodsky's "heroes", Giants Chair, in his home town of Methuen, Massachusetts. For the following six to seven months, however, all the band members were prepossessed with other musical projects, resulting in infrequent rehearsal and intermittent live performance. They did occasionally play live during this period, however, performing with bands such as Piebald, Jejune, and Regulator Watts.

They recorded as Kid Kilowatt only once before the official demise of the band, in July 1997. During this session, they recorded "Bicycle Song" and "The Scope" on Ballou's 8-track machine; this version of "Bicycle Song" appeared on Hydra Head Records CD sampler Volume 1.

After Brodsky joined Converge, whilst still a member of Cave In, in 1997, the amount of time being devoted to Kid Kilowatt began to wane. Matt Redmond had moved to New Hampshire also, causing "enthusiasm for the band to fizzle". They played what would be their last show in January 1998 at the Met Café in Providence, Rhode Island. Soon after that show, Brodsky left Converge in order to devote all his time to Cave In, now as not only the guitarist, but as the vocalist. McGrath and Ballou continued their duties with Cave In and Converge, respectively, and Redmond joined a new band called Eulcid. As Brodsky eulogises: "There was simply no time left in our schedules for Kid Kilowatt and the band collapsed".

In November 1998, the band decided to try to record everything they had written together. Recording continued at GodCity until October 1999, occurring "completely sporadically; a week night here and there, maybe a full day during one weekend of a month or two". Brodsky describes this as "quite evident from the sound of the record". During these sessions, some new material was composed, including "Memorial Drive", "Glass of Shattered Youth", "Cadence for a Rainy Day" and "Cadence for the Desert Sun". The last Kid Kilowatt song ever recorded was the album version of "Tug of War". The record was mastered at M-works in Cambridge, Massachusetts.

== Release ==
Hit Single (SN029) cover art.

Predating Guitar Method by three years, Second Nature Recordings released a 7-inch Kid Kilowatt single entitled Hit Single in 2001. It includes tracks "Peeping Tomboy" and "Glass of Shattered Youth", described as "a playful companion to their Guitar Method debut full-length". The vinyl saw two pressings. Second Nature also released the original version of Guitar Method on 12" on October 14, 2003, in slightly abridged form. The vinyl edit excluded the tracks "Glass of Shattered Youth", "Blue/Green Heart" and "Tug of War". These three tracks were credited as "bonus tracks" on the Hydra Head Records CD, released on March 9, 2004.

== Reception ==
Professional ratings
Review scores
Source	Rating
Allmusic	4/5 stars
Tufts Observer	Positive

Critical reception to the album was largely positive; reviews specifically praised the band's musicianship and the range of material on the album. Adam Moore, writing for the Tufts Observer, posits that "[a]ll of the members bring their great musical abilities to Kid Kilowatt and make them more palatable to the listener who isn't into blast beats and Jake Bannon's [of Converge] distinctive voice". The album's sound is described as "more recent Cave In, but without the spacey effects and meandering songwriting". Moore likens the sound to that of Thursday, but concedes that "Kilowatt isn’t even that metallic or scream-oriented". Attempting to categorise that band, a ScenePointBlank review writes that "[o]ne could narrowly define Kid Kilowatt as either indie-rock or post-hardcore, both are accurate descriptions". Moore says that "[o]verall, the album sounds rather pop-y", and that their use of "pop hooks combined with post-pop chord progressions" gives the album a "very melodic feel". Chris Morgan, in a glowing review, writes that Guitar Method is "a sleeper classic of the modern underground".

Several songs are selected as stand-outs throughout the album. "Tug of War" is labelled as "the strongest song on the album", with John D. Luerssen writing that "the cohesiveness of the material suggests the lads in Kid Kilowatt exited this side project as friends. After all, only buddies capable of putting their differences aside could craft the soaring, majestic "Tug of War," where Brodsky's wide-reaching pipes mesh brilliantly with KK's ace musicianship". He continues to say that "the disc shifts from roaring, expansive rockers like "Bicycle Song" to crunching anthems like "Ted Nugent" and on to lilting, near-ballads like "Memorial Drive" with inexplicable ease". Moore writes that "The Scope" "encapsulates what the rest of the album will sound like. It starts out sounding rather crunchy and smooths out as the album progresses, providing a good contrasting effect that runs throughout the album". Moore, however, writes that "Memorial Drive" is "only mediocre. It's the only song on the album over five minutes long. Playing slow just isn't this band's forte, although they have the ability to write poignant lyrics". Similarly, a ScenePointBlank review states that "Cadence for a Rainy Day" and "Memorial Drive" "often diverge and lead the listener off-course".

== Track listing ==
All tracks are written by Kid Kilowatt

No.	Title	Notes	Length
1.	"The Scope"		4:54
2.	"Red Carpet"		2:06
3.	"Radio Pow for Now"		4:34
4.	"Peeping Tomboy"		4:47
5.	"Cadence for a Rainy Day"		1:41
6.	"7th Inning Song Formation"		4:31
7.	"Bicycle Song"		4:01
8.	"Rushing to Relax"		1:03
9.	"Ted Nugent"		4:31
10.	"Memorial Drive"		5:05
11.	"Cadence for the Desert Sun"		3:56
12.	"Glass of Shattered Youth"	Appears only on CD release	3:59
13.	"Blue/Green Heart"	Appears only on CD release	3:58
14.	"Tug of War"	Appears only on CD release	6:13
Total length:			55:11

== Personnel ==
Band members

- Kurt Ballou – guitar
- Stephen Brodsky – guitar, vocals
- Adam McGrath – bass
- Matt Redmond – drums
- Aaron Stuart – guitar

Other personnel

- Aaron Turner – album artwork and design
- Nick Zampiello – mastering
