= Creative Eclipses =

EP by Cave In
- Released: 1999
- Recorded: November 1998
- Studio: Salad Days (Gloucester, Massachusetts)
- Genre: Alternative rock; space rock; art rock
- Length: 18:25
- Label: Hydra Head Records (HH666-38)
- Producer: Brian McTernan

Cave In chronology
| Until Your Heart Stops (1998) | Creative Eclipses (1999) | Jupiter (2000) |

Professional ratings
Review scores
| Source | Rating |
|---|---|
| Allmusic | 4/5 stars |

Creative Eclipses is a 1999 EP by alternative rock band Cave In, released on Hydra Head Records. Noted for the band's experimentation with their already established sound, the release hints at the musical direction the group would take for their next full-length album Jupiter. A remastered edition including bonus tracks was released on 12" vinyl on April 7, 2015.

== Track listing ==
All tracks are written by Cave In, except where noted.

| No. | Title | Writer(s) | Length |
|---|---|---|---|
| 1. | "Luminance" | | 4:18 |
| 2. | "Sonata McGrath" | | 1:51 |
| 3. | "Magnified" (Failure cover) | Ken Andrews, Greg Edwards | 2:56 |
| 4. | "Burning Down the Billboards" | | 1:39 |
| 5. | "Sonata Brodsky" | | 7:41 |

2015 Remastered Edition Bonus Tracks
| No. | Title | Length |
|---|---|---|
| 6. | "Luminance" (live) | 4:39 |
| 7. | "Breath of Water" (demo) | 7:59 |
| 8. | "Widow's Peak" | 3:06 |

== Personnel ==
Cave In

- Stephen Brodsky – vocals, guitar
- Adam McGrath – guitar
- Caleb Scofield – bass
- John-Robert Conners – drums

Additional

- Brian McTernan – producer
- Dave Murello – mastering
- Jacob Bannon – design, art direction
