= Beyond Hypothermia =

Beyond Hypothermia may refer to:

- Beyond Hypothermia (album), a compilation album by Cave In
- Beyond Hypothermia (film), a 1996 film directed by Patrick Leung
