= Harmonic Tremors =

Studio album by Zozobra
- Released: January 30, 2007
- Recorded: Translator Audio, Brooklyn, New York
- Genre: Post-metal, sludge metal
- Label: Hydra Head Records (HH666-125)
- Producer: Andrew Schneider, Caleb Scofield

Zozobra chronology
Harmonic Tremors (2007)	Bird of Prey (2008)

Professional ratings
Review scores
Source	Rating
Sonic Frontiers	(7.8/10) link

Harmonic Tremors is the first studio album by post-metal band Zozobra. It was released in 2007 on Hydra Head Records.

== Track listing ==
1. The Blessing – 5:36
2. Kill and Crush – 3:26
3. Levitate – 3:00
4. Soon to Follow – 4:14
5. Silver Ghost – 3:19
6. Invisible Wolves – 2:54
7. Peripheral Lows – 2:18
8. The Vast Expanse – 4:23
9. Caldera – 4:08
10. A Distant Star Fades – 4:02

== Personnel ==
- Caleb Scofield – Bass guitar, guitar, vocals, producer
- Santos "Hanno" Montano – Drums
- Adam McGrath – Guitar, back vocal, soloist
- Aaron Turner – Artwork and design
- Andrew Schneider – Producer, Engineer, Mixing
- Nick Zampiello – Mastering
