= Anchor (Cave In song) =

Single by Cave In

from the album Antenna
- Released: May 19, 2003
- Recorded: 2002
- Studio: Cello Studios, Los Angeles
- Genre: Alternative rock
- Length: 3:18
- Label: RCA; Magic Bullet
- Songwriter(s): Stephen Brodsky; Adam McGrath; Caleb Scofield; John-Robert Conners
- Producer(s): Rich Costey

Cave In singles chronology
"Lift Off" / "Jupiter" (2002)	"Anchor" (2003)	"Inspire" (2003)

"Anchor" is a song by American rock band Cave In. The song was released as the first single from the band's third studio album Antenna. "Anchor" was Cave In's first single released through a major label and, to date, is the band's only charting single. The single's B-Side was released under two different titles, "Harmless, Armless" and "Minus World", but they are in fact the same song.

== Music video ==
The song's music video was directed by Dean Karr. The video follows a man whose feet have been encased in concrete and how he struggles to cope with it. The video ends with the man being freed, as the concrete blocks fall apart and are washed away in a rainstorm.

== Track listing ==
CD single

No.	Title	Length
1.	"Anchor"	3:18
2.	"Minus World"	3:05
3.	"Devil's Pinata Head"	3:55

RCA 7" single

Side A
No.	Title	Length
1.	"Anchor"	3:18

Side B
No.	Title	Length
1.	"Minus World"	2:41

Magic Bullet 7" single

Side A
No.	Title	Length
1.	"Anchor"	3:18

Side B
No.	Title	Length
1.	"Harmless, Armless"	2:51

== Charts ==
Chart (2003)	Peak position
US Alternative Airplay (Billboard)	34
US Active Rock (Billboard)	36
US Mainstream Rock (Billboard)	37
UK Singles Chart (OCC)	53
