= Tides of Tomorrow =

Tides of Tomorrow may refer to:

- Tides of Tomorrow (video game), a video game
- Tides of Tomorrow (EP), a 2002 EP
