= Bird of Prey (album) =

Studio album by Zozobra
- Released: August 5, 2008
- Length: 30:01
- Label: Hydra Head (HH666-156)
- Producer: Aaron Harris, Caleb Scofield

Zozobra chronology
Harmonic Tremors (2007)	Bird of Prey (2008)	Savage Masters (2013)

Professional ratings
Review scores
Source	Rating
Exclaim!	(positive)
PopMatters	6/10 stars
Prefix	7/10
Scene Point Blank	7.5/10

Bird of Prey is the second studio album by the American rock band Zozobra. The album was released on August 5, 2008, through Hydra Head Records. Bird of Prey was largely written and performed by Caleb Scofield with Isis member Aaron Harris performing drums. Harris replaces drummer Santos Montano from Zozobra's debut album Harmonic Tremors because he and Scofield had wanted to record together for a while, and Scofield had always envisioned the band with a revolving cast of musicians.

Following Scofield's death in 2018, Bird of Prey and Harmonic Tremors were released as a double LP with black-and-white versions of their original cover art as a benefit to his family.

== Track listing ==
All tracks written by Zozobra.

1. "Emanate" – 3:17
2. "Heavy with Shadows" – 3:32
3. "Treacherous" – 3:08
4. "Heartless Enemy" – 4:14
5. "Big Needles" – 2:08
6. "Sharks That Circle" – 3:31
7. "In Jet Streams" – 3:10
8. "Laser Eyes" – 7:01

== Personnel ==
- Aaron Harris – production, drums
- Caleb Scofield – production, bass, guitar, vocals
- Aaron Turner – artwork
