= Heavy Pendulum =

Studio album by Cave In
- Released: May 20, 2022
- Recorded: January–February, August 2021
- Studios: GodCity, Salem, Massachusetts
- Genres: Sludge metal; stoner metal; post-metal; post-grunge; thrash metal
- Length: 70:30
- Label: Relapse
- Producer: Kurt Ballou

Cave In chronology
Final Transmission (2019)	Heavy Pendulum (2022)	Live at BBC's Maida Vale Studios (2023)

Singles from Heavy Pendulum
- 1. "New Reality" Released: March 15, 2022; 2. "Blinded by a Blaze" Released: April 5, 2022; 3. "Blood Spiller" Released: April 26, 2022; 4. "Reckoning" Released: May 10, 2022

Professional ratings
Aggregate scores
Source	Rating
Metacritic	81/100
Review scores
Source	Rating
AllMusic	4/5 stars
Blabbermouth.net	9/10
Classic Rock	3.5/5 stars
Distorted Sound	10/10
The Guardian	4/5 stars
Kerrang!	4/5
New Noise Magazine	4.5/5 stars
Sputnikmusic	3.5/5

Heavy Pendulum is the seventh studio album by American rock band Cave In, released on May 20, 2022, through Relapse Records. This is the band's first album with bassist/backing vocalist Nate Newton, though late bassist/vocalist Caleb Scofield still has a presence on the record.

== Background ==
In July 2021, Cave In signed to Relapse Records and announced its seventh studio album will be released through the label. The album's title was revealed as Heavy Pendulum with the release of the single "New Reality" on March 15, 2022. The album's second single, "Blinded by a Blaze", was released on April 5. The album's third single, "Blood Spiller", was released on April 26. The fourth single, "Reckoning", was released on May 10; the song was written entirely by guitarist Adam McGrath.

The album was produced by Converge guitarist Kurt Ballou, who produced Cave In's debut Until Your Heart Stops.

"New Reality" features a riff that was written by late bassist/vocalist Caleb Scofield in 2011. Additionally, "Amaranthine" features lyrics that were written by Scofield.

== Musical style and lyrical themes ==
Revolver described lead single and opening track "New Reality" as leaning "into the quartet's sludgier inclinations." Jon Hadusek from Consequence referred to the song's riff as "heavy sludge and stoner metal." Second single, "Blinded by a Blaze", has been described as post-metal.

Nicholas Senior of New Noise Magazine described the album as stoner metal, comparing it to Red Fang. Additionally, the album has been noted as having a strong grunge influence and "employing a wide-ranging amalgam of brooding post-grunge and 'Creeping Death'-era Metallica thrash".

"Blood Spiller" was written in response to several events that occurred in 2020. Frontman Stephen Brodsky stated:

If you laid out the timeline for 2020 like a recipe, it might look something like this: global pandemic + lockdowns + worldwide protests over the wrongful death of George Floyd + election year = cocktail for end times. Somewhere in that concoction, we found ingredients for a new Cave In album. Blood Spiller is the sound of us swallowing it, getting ripped on the horrors within, and coming down to reflect on it through song.

== Track listing ==
All tracks are written by Cave In (Stephen Brodsky, Adam McGrath, Nate Newton, and John-Robert Conners), except where noted.

No.	Title	Writer(s)	Length
1.	"New Reality"	Cave In, Caleb Scofield	4:41
2.	"Blood Spiller"		4:01
3.	"Floating Skulls"		3:39
4.	"Heavy Pendulum"		5:09
5.	"Pendulambient"		1:58
6.	"Careless Offering"		4:55
7.	"Blinded by a Blaze"		7:39
8.	"Amaranthine"	Cave In, Scofield	4:27
9.	"Searchers of Hell"		3:53
10.	"Nightmare Eyes"		7:05
11.	"Days of Nothing"		1:50
12.	"Waiting for Love"		4:32
13.	"Reckoning"	McGrath	4:33
14.	"Wavering Angel"		12:08
Total length:			70:30

Japanese bonus track
No.	Title	Writer(s)	Length
15.	"Moor" (Every Time I Die cover)	Keith Buckley, Jordan Buckley, Andrew Williams, Stephen Micciche, Ryan Leger	3:53
Total length:			74:23

== Personnel ==
Cave In

- Stephen Brodsky – lead vocals, lead guitar
- Adam McGrath – rhythm guitar, backing vocals, lead vocals on "Reckoning"
- Nate Newton – bass, backing vocals, tambourine
- John-Robert Conners – drums

Production

- Kurt Ballou – production, mixing
- Zach Weeks – assistant producer, additional mixing
- Richey Beckett – artwork

== Charts ==
Chart performance for Heavy Pendulum
Chart (2022)	Peak position
Swiss Albums (Schweizer Hitparade)	97
UK Rock & Metal Albums (Official Charts)	2
