= Tides of Tomorrow (EP) =

EP by Cave In
- Released: October 15, 2002
- Recorded: April 2002
- Studios: The Outpost; Stoughton, Massachusetts; Q Division Studios; Somerville, Massachusetts; New Alliance Studios; Boston, Massachusetts
- Genres: Alternative rock; space rock; progressive rock
- Length: 29:44
- Labels: Hydra Head Records (HH666-66)
- Producers: Cave In; Andrew Schneider

Cave In chronology
Jupiter (2000)	Tides of Tomorrow (2002)	Antenna (2003)

Professional ratings
Review scores
Source	Rating
Pitchfork	6.9/10

Tides of Tomorrow is an EP by alternative rock band Cave In, released through Hydra Head Records on October 15, 2002.

== Track listing ==
No.	Title	Length
1.	"Come into Your Own"	4:52
2.	"Dark Driving"	5:28
3.	"The Calypso"	4:02
4.	"Tides of Tomorrow"	6:25
5.	"The Callus" (Giants Chair cover)	3:31
6.	"Everest"	5:26

Bandcamp unlisted bonus tracks
No.	Title	Length
7.	"Dark Driving" (Demo)	5:37
8.	"The Calypso" (Demo)	3:49
9.	"Tides of Tomorrow" (Demo)	7:17

== Chart positions ==
Year	Chart	Peak position
2003	UK Budget Album Chart	3

== Personnel ==
Cave In

- Stephen Brodsky – vocals, guitar
- Adam McGrath – guitar, bongos
- Caleb Scofield – bass, vocals
- John-Robert Conners – drums
