= Beyond Hypothermia (album) =

Compilation album by Cave In
- Released: February 17, 1998
- Recorded: December 1995 – November 1997
- Studios: Salad Days Studio; Bernard Studio
- Genre: Metalcore
- Length: 49:43
- Labels: Hydra Head (CD) (HH666-25)
- Producers: Kurt Ballou; Brian McTernan; Cave In

Cave In chronology
Cave In (1997)	Beyond Hypothermia (1998)	Until Your Heart Stops (1998)

Professional ratings
Review scores
Source	Rating
Allmusic	4/5 stars
The Encyclopedia of Popular Music	3/5 stars

Beyond Hypothermia is a compilation album and the first full-length by Cave In. Released in February 1998 on Hydra Head Records, it compiles material from early out-of-print releases with new tracks.

== Track listing ==
Beyond Hypothermia track listing
No.	Title	Writer(s)	Original release (Year)	Length
1.	"Crossbearer"	Adam McGrath	Cave In 7" (1997)	5:26
2.	"Chameleon"	Jay Frechette	Cave In 7" (1997)	6:22
3.	"Capsize"	Stephen Brodsky	Previously unreleased (Note: An earlier recording of "Capsize" previously appeared on Cave In's 1995 cassette demo.)	4:47
4.	"Stoic"	Brodsky	Split 7" with Early Grace (1996)	2:45
5.	"Programmed Behind"	Brodsky	Split 7" with Piebald (1996)	3:06
6.	"Flypaper"	Brodsky	Split 7" with Gambit (1996)	6:26
7.	"Mitigate"	Brodsky	Split 7" with Early Grace (1996)	2:09
8.	"Pivotal"	Brodsky	Between a Rock and a Hard Place 7" (1997)	3:50
9.	"Ritual Famine"	Dave Scrod	Previously unreleased	3:42
10.	"Crambone"	Scrod	Previously unreleased	11:03

- "Crambone" ends at 5:06. After three minutes of silence, begins a hidden medley of Metallica songs.

Japanese CD bonus track
No.	Title	Length
11.	"Until Your Heart Stops" (demo version)	4:53

== Personnel ==
The purpose of "Beyond ..." was to take a mess of songs we had laying around available on out-of-print records and make them available to more people on one convenient CD. We probably mislead people into thinking that this CD was our first real full-length record, which in no way is this true. "Beyond . . ." is something that perhaps should have been released after Cave In made its first "real" full-length, but when it came time for us to release something new, we weren't finished writing "Until Your Heart Stops". So we (with our then-vocalist Dave Scrod) decided to spice up the concept of "Beyond . . ." by revamping some of these older songs and recording a few new tracks too. All previously-released tracks on "Beyond . . ." except for the first 3 have Dave Scrod's voice in replacement of Jay Frechette's, along with re-recorded guitar tracks (except for the first 3 tracks + "Mitigate"). Kurt Ballou and Andrew Bernard mixed and remixed everything but the first 3 tracks on "Beyond . . .". Looking back on this maneuver, we're not the first to admit that all this re-tracking stuff was a dumb decision to make. But we still have back up DAT's of the original song mixes without Dave Scrod, so perhaps these will surface on some kind of future release. The sample that appears between "Crambone" and the hidden Metallica medley track is taken from the movie "Carrie". Steve also made his drumming (hah) debut in Cave In on "Crambone".

— Cave In

Cave In

- Stephen Brodsky – guitar
- Adam McGrath – guitar
- John-Robert Conners – drums
- Jay Frechette – vocals (tracks 1–8)
- Dave Scrod – vocals (tracks 9–10)
- Justin Matthes – bass guitar (tracks 1–8)
- Andy Kyte – bass guitar (tracks 9–10)

Production and recording history

- Kurt Ballou – Beyond Hypothermia production
- Cave In – Beyond Hypothermia production
- Tracks 6, 8 recorded at Salad Days Studio with Brian McTernan in December 1995
- Tracks 4, 5, 7 recorded at Salad Days Studio with Brian McTernan in April 1996
- Tracks 1, 2, 3 recorded at Salad Days Studio with Brian McTernan in January–February 1997
- Tracks 9, 10 recorded Bernard Studio in November 1997

Art and design

- Jacob Bannon – visuals, design
- Adam McGrath – cover video still
- Todd Pollack – live photography
