= Antenna (Cave In album) =

Studio album by Cave In
- Released: March 18, 2003
- Recorded: 2002
- Studio: Cello Studios (Los Angeles)
- Genres: Alternative rock; space rock; progressive rock; alternative metal
- Length: 56:17
- Labels: RCA; Hydra Head Records
- Producer: Rich Costey

Cave In chronology
Tides of Tomorrow (2002)	Antenna (2003)	Perfect Pitch Black (2005)

Singles from Antenna
- 1. "Anchor" Released: May 19, 2003; 2. "Inspire" Released: August 12, 2003

Antenna is the third studio album and the first major label album by the American rock band Cave In. Released in 2003, it was Cave In's first and only album for RCA before they were dropped by the record label and re-signed with Hydra Head. Antenna marked a shift in Cave In's musical style which, while critically praised, was met with distaste from longtime fans. In the midst of such polarization, the band would later return to its previous style, resulting in Perfect Pitch Black in 2005.

== Background and recording ==
Following the success of their 2000 album, Jupiter, Cave In were approached by RCA to record their next album. While the band signed with RCA, they continued to maintain a business relationship with Hydra Head, which had released their previous records and would continue to distribute their catalogue.

Continuing with the direction the band started with on Creative Eclipses and Jupiter, Antenna further emphasized spacey, progressive rock tendencies with soaring anthems and clean, melodic vocals while minimising the heavy metal elements that were prominent in their first recordings. Guitarist Adam McGrath attributed the musical shift to both physical and creative limitations; physically, the singer Stephen Brodsky had alleged concerns over the long-term effects of performing harsh metal vocals. Creatively, Cave In had also grown tired of being pigeonholed within the metalcore genre and being forced to consistently perform amongst such acts. On a much greater budget, Antenna was also given three months of fundamental recording time in contrast to the four days for Jupiter and took a total of six months.

Weeks after the album's release, McGrath described the recording process:

"Bruce Floor had opinions during the recording process, but he let us make our own decisions. He put us in a position to make our own decisions and he supported us when we made them. It is a different, exciting time in our lives right now."

However, months later, he noted that in comparison to small labels, "RCA tried harder to get things done, but more people wanted to put their fingerprints on our record." McGrath elaborated that the label pressured the band to create radio-friendly singles and that the band overtook their lives. "All these new people came into the picture. We had a business manager, lawyer, A&R guy, marketing guy, people that are your quote/unquote friends. We were young and naive to the whole process and it affected how we wrote songs."

== Touring and promotion ==
Cave In was chosen for the second stage on the 2003 Lollapalooza tour. Afterward, the band toured Europe in support of Foo Fighters and Muse.

In summer 2003, guitarist Adam McGrath lamented, "We got major backlash for growing out of our metal phase... People were calling us faggots; they were using derogatory terms on us. I didn't want them around us, let alone liking our band. Fuck them. I'm glad we could weed them out." He later reflected, "It got to the point where they were throwing shit at us when we were playing. They were pissed. Some people said 'fuck this,' but others tried to figure out what were doing and grabbed it." The backlash apparently had an effect on Cave In who began revisiting their metal roots during concerts later in the year. They began a US tour alongside From Autumn to Ashes, Every Time I Die, and Funeral for a Friend in September.

During this time, RCA had merged with BMG and Sony and Cave In's status with RCA was put into question. The band was scheduled for a meet and greet where no one showed up. By the following year, after a dispute over musical direction, Cave In would be released from the label.

The track "Anchor" was released as the album's lead single. The video for "Anchor" starred actor Richard Edson trying to cope with his daily life after he wakes up with his feet imprisoned in concrete blocks. When asked about the song, McGrath described it as a poor choice for a single but suitable because of its short length. Due to the song's lackluster reception in radio and TV, the label allegedly gave up on Antenna. "Looking back, the people at RCA were really into it. Two years after the fact, it was a mistake," noted McGrath. Despite the band's animosity towards the song, it remains their only song to chart in the UK Singles Chart and the US Modern Rock Charts.

"Inspire" was selected as the second single from the album. The video created to promote the single was directed by Gavin Bowden. It features the band breaking into a music store to play the instruments and use the CCTV to record a performance of the song.

== Reception ==
Professional ratings
Aggregate scores
Source	Rating
Metacritic	78/100
Review scores
Source	Rating
AllMusic	4.5/5 stars
Alternative Press	5/5 stars
The Encyclopedia of Popular Music	4/5 stars
Kerrang!	5/5 stars
Pitchfork	6.1/10
Q	4/5 stars

Despite the backlash it received from older fans of the band, Antenna was positively received by many contemporary music critics upon its release. At Metacritic, which assigns a normalized rating out of 100 to reviews from mainstream publications, the album holds an average score of 78, based on 14 reviews, indicating "generally positive reviews".

Amongst the more positive of these was Johnny Loftus' review for AllMusic. Rating it 4 and 1/2 stars out of 5, Loftus said that "Boston's Cave In jumped to RCA and the world of big-time promotion for Antenna, but it's satisfying to hear that their intelligently warped sound has kept its teeth in the transition." Brian Kraus gave the album a five-star rating in the review for Alternative Press. Concluding the article, Kraus declared that "This should be in everyone's stereo this spring, as it may go down in the history books as the Pet Sounds for the aggressive-rock world." In the Delusions of Adequacy review, it was claimed that "Antenna follows up on the trend gradually built by Cave In's previous releases, meaning that the songs are less wandering, more trimmed and primed for a larger audience. And yet, the band has also maintained its own identity and created something it can be proud of without being worried about being called major label sellouts or anything of the sort." A review from Q simply stated that the album was "The most successful synthesis of [Cave In's] prog-tinged ambitions so far."

While many critics applauded the album, some were more muted in their praise. Reviewing for Pitchfork, contributor Dominique Leone wrote "I'm not sure Cave In features the world's most interesting, nuanced singing, and again, I have to cast my vote against nu-rock's maxed-out mix preferences, making every moment on the disc a peak, which effectively makes every moment part of a monolithic, dulling experience. Still, if there is a way to make decent radio rock outside of Thursday and Queens of the Stone Age, Cave In are doing it now."

== After Antenna ==
During the later touring schedule for Antenna, Cave In acknowledged the poor reception from longtime fans and began a return to their previous, heavier sound. The group started recording new material in the vein of their earlier style with no label interference, but the less commercial material was received negatively by RCA. The label eventually agreed to release Cave In in 2004 and allow them full ownership to their new demos. This led to Cave In's full re-signing with Hydra Head and the release of Perfect Pitch Black in 2005.

Since their departure from RCA, members of Cave In have reflected largely negatively on their experience with a major label. In addition to its massive budget, the band felt pressured into a more commercialized style and an intense schedule that they have since criticized. Lyrically, several songs on the band's follow-up album vented their frustrations with RCA, including a song entitled "Trepanning".

In a 2009 interview in which he assessed the band's discography up to that point, Brodsky said the album was "the big, slick rock record we spent way too much time and money making. That's basically what happens when too many people get involved in your business. Still, I can stand behind songs like'"Seafrost' and 'Youth Overrided'."

== Track listing ==
All songs written by Cave In.

No.	Title	Length
1.	"Stained Silver"	4:08
2.	"Inspire"	4:20
3.	"Joy Opposites"	4:48
4.	"Anchor"	3:14
5.	"Beautiful Son"	3:57
6.	"Seafrost"	8:58
7.	"Rubber and Glue"	3:44
8.	"Youth Overrided"	5:17
9.	"Breath of Water"	5:36
10.	"Lost in the Air"	3:41
11.	"Penny Racer"	3:11
12.	"Woodwork"	5:17

European DVD bonus track

13. "Day Trader" - 3:17

Japanese bonus track

13. "Devil's Head Pinata" - 3:53

== Charts ==
=== Album ===
Chart	Peak position
UK Album Chart	67
US Billboard 200	169

=== Singles ===
Year	Single	Chart	Peak position
2003	"Anchor"	UK Singles Chart	53
2003	"Anchor"	US Mainstream Rock Tracks	37
2003	"Anchor"	US Modern Rock Tracks	34

== Personnel ==
Band members

- Stephen Brodsky – guitar and vocals
- J.R. Conners – drums and vocals
- Adam McGrath – guitar and vocals
- Caleb Scofield – bass guitar and vocals

Other personnel

- Rich Costey – producer, engineer and mixing
- Bruce Flohr – art direction
- Wally Gagle – engineer
- Michael Lavine – photography
- Dan Leffler – second engineer
- Bob Ludwig – mastering
- Gersh – drum technician
