= Final Transmission =

Studio album by Cave In
- Released: June 7, 2019
- Recorded: 2010; 2014; 2017–2018
- Studio: Various
- Genres: Alternative rock; alternative metal; post-hardcore; space rock
- Length: 31:19
- Label: Hydra Head (HH666-245)
- Producer: Cave In

Cave In chronology
| White Silence (2011) | Final Transmission (2019) | Heavy Pendulum (2022) |

Singles from Final Transmission
- 1. "All Illusion" Released: April 8, 2019

Final Transmission is the sixth studio album by the American rock band Cave In. The album was released on June 7, 2019, through Hydra Head Records. Final Transmission is Cave In's first studio album in eight years since 2011's White Silence and marks the final recordings of bassist Caleb Scofield, who died in a car crash a year prior to the album's release. The band promoted the album with online streams of "All Illusion" and "Shake My Blood" prior to its release. It is the final album released by Hydra Head Records before the label folded in 2020, with Cave In's back catalogue being returned to them.

== Background ==
Since their last studio album, White Silence (2011), the members of Cave In would spend the ensuing eight years occupied with other musical endeavors. Stephen Brodsky formed the progressive hardcore punk band Mutoid Man in 2012, Adam McGrath and John-Robert Conners formed the psychedelic punk/noise rock band Nomad Stones, while Caleb Scofield continued working with Old Man Gloom and Zozobra. Other attributing factors to the eight-year gap between studio releases included Brodsky moving to New York, and difficulty agreeing creatively on what a new album should sound like. Cave In was more interested in "hanging out, get-togethers, parties and camping trips" as friends than working on a new album as members of a band, though new album discussions were taking place over the years.

Cave In began gathering for warm-up "jam sessions" in late 2017 and early 2018. In February 2018, the band formally began writing new material that would become their follow-up album to White Silence. After a full weekend of writing and recording in Massachusetts, Scofield drove back home to his family in New Hampshire. On that trip on March 28, 2018, Scofield got into a fatal car crash. The surviving members of Cave In put the new album on hold in favor of touring in honor of Scofield and raising funds for his family – a wife and two kids. Major memorial performances included a Boston show with Converge, a Los Angeles show with a one-off reunion of Isis and an acoustic performance with Brodsky and McGrath at Roadburn Festival – the latter of which was recorded and released as Live At Roadburn Festival 2018 – Tribute to Caleb Scofield. In January 2019, Cave In announced it would be releasing a new album featuring finished tracks from their 2018 sessions with Scofield.

== Recording and composition ==
The tracks that appear on Final Transmission were originally recorded as demos that weren't intended to be publicly released. All songs were recorded live to hand-held four-track tape with minor digital additions of drums or guitars. The rough tracks were later polished and completed with mixing by Andrew Schneider and mastering by James Plotkin. McGrath said of the recording process: "It was very haphazard, and we didn't go into this thinking they were going to be released the way it is today. We were lucky enough to have Andrew Schneider go through everything and make it sound way better than we could have ever imagined." Cave In's previous album White Silence was also recorded in a practice space, and McGrath noted that Scofield was hoping to not repeat that for the next album and record it in a proper studio.

The band described the sound of the album as featuring "glimpses of past Cave In eras" from Jupiter (2000) through White Silence, which was a direction Scofield influenced. Recalling email correspondences between Scofield about the new material, Brodsky said "He was really digging the stuff that was spacey, heavy, a little bit weird, but with very pretty melodies and hooks. I think he was encouraging us to embrace what we've always been good at and what sets us apart from our contemporaries." All tracks on Final Transmission include contributions from Scofield, including guitar, bass and vocals. The opening/title track of the album includes a voice memo from Scofield that he sent to his band members about a new song idea after their final writing session. McGrath said it was difficult to listen to the recording, and continued: "We were surprised to get it from him, actually, but we thought it was great. And that was it. In a weird way, it's the end of the story as far as our relationship together." The closing track "Led to the Wolves" was largely composed by Scofield.

The members of Cave In had emotional difficulty revisiting the demos and completing the album. On this topic, Brodsky said: "I don't think I've cried so much putting together any record [...] I don't try to look too deeply into how these things work, but these recordings are some of our last moments spending time with [Caleb]." At the time of the album's announcement, McGrath said he hadn't listened to the album all the way through yet. He said: "I feel really lucky to have this record. I love it, but I don't like listening to it. I'm sure I'll listen to it eventually, but right now it's difficult. Just hearing him play kills me. I'll miss him forever." The lyrics and vocals for the track "Shake My Blood" were performed by all three surviving members of Cave In after the death of Scofield, which Brodsky said was the first time he was able to express his feelings in song form. He said: "It's a mix of extreme grief, frustration and anger. I was trying to do something to gain the clearest answer about whatever the next move might be."

The title Final Transmission refers to this being the final release to include Scofield's contributions. When asked in an interview if the title could be a double entendre that also refers to this being the final album from Cave In, McGrath said he was unsure. He elaborated: "It was nice to get out there and play a few shows, but we're still going through the process of moving forward. I think we need to live through this first, [and] then we'll have an idea of what the future holds."

== Release ==
Cave In released Final Transmission on June 7, 2019, through Hydra Head Records. Hydra Head has released the majority of Cave In's releases to date since 1997, but has been largely inactive since 2012. Half of all proceeds from album sales will go to Scofield's family. Before deciding to finish and release their 2018 demos as Final Transmission, Cave In struggled with how they wanted to continue. According to Brodsky, McGrath suggested they should do whatever they could to support the Scofield family, which was a "sobering moment" that "helped to start clear the fog of how to climb out of the depths of what we were experiencing."

Cave In began promoting Final Transmission with an online stream of "All Illusion" on April 8, 2019. The track was selected to be the first release because it features Scofield's only lyrical contribution to the album. "All Illusion" originally had lyrics written entirely by Brodsky, but Cave In found some lyrics in Scofield's journal and incorporated them into the song. On May 14, Cave In made "Shake My Blood" available for online streaming.

== Reception ==
Professional ratings
Aggregate scores
| Source | Rating |
|---|---|
| Metacritic | 82/100 |
Review scores
| Source | Rating |
| Exclaim! | 8/10 stars |
| Kerrang! | 4/5 stars |
| Metal1.Info | 8.5/10 |
| Sputnikmusic | 3.7/5 |
| Under the Radar | 7.5/10 stars |

On the review aggregator website Metacritic, Final Transmission has a score of 82 out of 100 based on 7 reviews, indicating "universal acclaim". Many reviewers noted the record's background, with Kerrang!s Nick Ruskell stating that "as a tribute, it is wonderful," though he also notes that the album is "superb" without taking it into consideration. Writing for Under the Radar, Adam Turner-Heffer did comment that the album could've been made better had Scofield been present to give the band more time to complete it. Critics also draw out similarities Final Transmission has with the band's previous output such as Jupiter.

The album was featured on Bandcamps "Bandcamp Daily" section on June 14, 2019.

== Track listing ==
| No. | Title | Length |
|---|---|---|
| 1. | "Final Transmission" | 2:02 |
| 2. | "All Illusion" | 3:35 |
| 3. | "Shake My Blood" | 4:16 |
| 4. | "Night Crawler" | 3:12 |
| 5. | "Lunar Day" | 2:22 |
| 6. | "Winter Window" | 4:40 |
| 7. | "Lanterna" | 3:54 |
| 8. | "Strange Reflection" | 4:06 |
| 9. | "Led to the Wolves" | 3:12 |

Japanese edition bonus track
| No. | Title | Length |
|---|---|---|
| 10. | "All Illusion (Demo)" | 3:12 |

== Personnel ==
Cave In

- Stephen Brodsky - vocals, guitar, bass on “All Illusion” and “Shake My Blood”
- John-Robert Conners - drums, vocals, guitar on “Lunar Day”
- Adam McGrath - guitar, vocals
- Caleb Scofield - bass, guitar and vocals on “Final Transmission”, guitar on “All Illusion“ and “Shake My Blood”

Additional personnel

- Andrew Schneider – mixing
- James Plotkin – mastering
- Aaron Turner – artwork, design
