= White Silence =

Studio album by Cave In
- Released: May 24, 2011
- Recorded: 2009–2010 at various locations in Massachusetts & New Hampshire
- Genres: Post-hardcore, alternative metal, metalcore, avant-garde metal
- Length: 35:44
- Label: Hydra Head (HH666-218)
- Producer: Cave In

Cave In chronology
Planets of Old (2009)	White Silence (2011)	Final Transmission (2019)

Professional ratings
Aggregate scores
Source	Rating
Metacritic	(80/100)
Review scores
Source	Rating
Allmusic	4.5/5 stars
Alternative Press	4/5 stars
The A.V. Club	(B)
Revolver	(4/5)
Rock Sound	(8/10)

White Silence is the fifth studio album by the American rock band Cave In. The album was released on May 24, 2011 through Hydra Head Records. White Silence was listed as one of Decibel magazine's most anticipated albums of 2011.

White Silence peaked at number 17 on the US Billboard Top Heatseekers chart.

== Track listing ==
No.	Title	Length
1.	"White Silence"	2:46
2.	"Serpents"	2:52
3.	"Sing My Loves"	8:18
4.	"Vicious Circles"	3:19
5.	"Centered"	3:00
6.	"Summit Fever"	4:04
7.	"Heartbreaks, Earthquakes"	3:12
8.	"Iron Decibels"	4:32
9.	"Reanimation"	3:41

Japanese bonus tracks
No.	Title	Length
10.	"Centered" (Demo)	2:45
11.	"Sing My Loves, Montreal" (Live at Club Soda 6/23, 2010)	7:32
12.	"Reanimation" (Demo)	3:51

== Personnel ==
White Silence personnel adapted from CD liner notes.

Cave In

- Stephen Brodsky – vocals, guitar, keyboard
- John-Robert Conners – drums, vocals, percussion, trash can
- Adam McGrath – vocals, guitar, piano, keys
- Caleb Scofield – vocals, bass guitar, guitars

Production and recording history

- Cave In – recording in 2009–2010 at Allston, Arlington, Cambridge, and Mashpee, Massachusetts & Warner, New Hampshire
- Stephen Brodsky – editing, tape manipulation, sonic manipulation
- Adam Taylor – mixing at Camp Street August–October 2010
- James Plotkin – mastering
- Q – additional percussion on "Iron Decibels"

Artwork and packaging

- Aaron Turner – artwork, design
- Faith Coloccia – design
- Adam McGrath – photographs
- John-Robert Conners – photographs
