= Kid Kilowatt =

American rock band

Background information
- Origin: Boston, Massachusetts, U.S.
- Genres: Indie rock, post-hardcore
- Years active: 1996–1997
- Labels: Hydra Head, Second Nature
- Past members: Kurt Ballou; Stephen Brodsky; Adam McGrath; Matt Redmond; Aaron Stuart

Kid Kilowatt was an American rock supergroup formed in 1996 and dissolved in 1997, including members of Cave In, Converge and Piebald. They wrote only one album, Guitar Method, first released by Second Nature Recordings in 2003.

Stephen Brodsky described the band as their "little softie rock outlet from the metal of Cave In", giving a sound "much mellower" than that of the members' main projects.

== History ==
Kid Kilowatt was initially created as "Ester of Wood Rosin" by Cave In's Steve Brodsky in August 1996, "inspired by [his] love for Giants Chair and [his] need for an alter-ego to Cave In". He recruited Adam McGrath, also of Cave In, on bass guitar, local drummer Matt Redmond and Piebald guitarist and vocalist Aaron Stuart. Brodsky took the role of guitarist and lead vocalist, and with this line-up they, in the words of Brodsky, "began to formulate some good ol' sappy-but-not-too-sappy rock n' roll tunes".

They wrote the first material destined for Guitar Method within the first few months, including "Teg Nugent" and "the original, 9 minute long opus version" of "Tug of War". In Autumn 1996, they recorded a four-song demo with Kurt Ballou at his 8-track home studio, GodCity. Brodsky hand-crafted the demo inserts in his high school graphic arts room, and about 400 copies of the demo were pressed. According to Brodsky, they were "gone in no time". In Spring 1997, Aaron Stuart left the band in order to concentrate on his primary project, Piebald. Kurt Ballou, of Converge, who had recorded and produced their prior 4-track demo, joined the band in his stead, and they renamed the band "Kid Kilowatt". The name was inspired by a Guided by Voices song entitled "Cool Off Kid Kilowatt", from their 1993 album Vampire on Titus.

Now with Ballou as a full-time member, the band re-developed songs written Stuart, including "The Bicycle Song", "7th Inning Song Formation", "The Scope", "Peeping Tomboy" and "Red Carpet", and resumed writing with "Radio Pow for Now". In their first show as Kid Kilowatt, they performed with Brodsky's "heroes", Giants Chair, in his home town of Methuen, Massachusetts. For the following six or seven months, all the band members were prepossessed with other musical projects, resulting in infrequent rehearsal and intermittent live performance. They did play live during this period, however, performing with bands including Piebald, Jejune, and Regulator Watts.

They recorded as Kid Kilowatt only once before the official demise of the band, in July 1997. During this session, they recorded "Bicycle Song" and "The Scope" on Ballou's 8-track machine; this version of "Bicycle Song" appeared on Hydra Head Records CD sampler Volume 1.

After Brodsky joined Converge, whilst still a member of Cave In, in 1997, the amount of time being devoted to Kid Kilowatt began to wane. Matt Redmond had moved to New Hampshire also, causing "enthusiasm for the band to fizzle". They played what would be their last show in January 1998 at the Met Cafe in Providence, Rhode Island. Soon after that show, Brodsky left Converge in order to devote all his time to Cave In, now as, not only the guitarist, but as the vocalist. McGrath and Ballou continued their duties with Cave In and Converge, respectively, and Redmond joined a new band called Eulcid. As Brodsky eulogises: "There was simply no time left in our schedules for Kid Kilowatt and the band collapsed".

In November 1998, the band decided to try to record everything they had written as a band. Recording continued at GodCity until October 1999, occurring "completely sporadically; a week night here and there, maybe a full day during one weekend of a month or two". Brodsky describes this as "quite evident from the sound of the record". During these sessions, new material was composed, including "Memorial Drive", "Glass of Shattered Youth", "Cadence for a Rainy Day" and "Cadence for the Desert Sun". The last Kid Kilowatt song ever recorded was the album version of "Tug of War". The record was mastered at M-works in Cambridge, Massachusetts.

== Members ==
- Kurt Ballou – guitar
- Stephen Brodsky – guitar, vocals
- Adam McGrath – bass
- Matt Redmond – drums
- Aaron Stuart – guitar

== Discography ==
=== EPs ===
- Hit Single (2001)

=== Albums ===
- Guitar Method (2004)
