= Black Face (band) =

American hardcore punk band

- Genres: Hardcore punk
- Years active: 2011 – 2012
- Label: Hydra Head
- Members: Tom Dobrov; Chuck Dukowski; Milo Gonzalez; Eugene Robinson

Black Face was an American hardcore punk band. The group featured bassist Chuck Dukowski formerly of Black Flag and SST Records, drummer Tom Dobrov, formerly of Oxbow and The Stiffs, guitarist Milo Gonzalez of Insects vs. Robots and The Chuck Dukowski Sextet, and vocalist Eugene Robinson of Oxbow and formerly Whipping Boy. They officially disbanded in February 2012

Writing for the zine The Birth of Tragedy, Robinson first met Dukowski when he interviewed Black Flag for an article he was writing. A friendship between the two formed, and later Dukowski was involved with SST Records when the label backed the 1997 American release of Oxbow's album Serenade in Red. In 2010 they discussed the possibility of forming a new band together. Dukowski suggested they revisit some songs he wrote for Black Flag before departing with the band, and Robinson agreed.

In 2011, Black Face recorded four songs that Dukowski had originally written for Black Flag's 1984 album My War: "Monster," "I Want to Kill You," "Where Will We Run" and "Leave Me Out to Rot." The songs will be released exclusively in a 7" vinyl record format. According to Robinson, the reason for avoiding a digital version was to curb file sharing and also return music releases to a physical medium complete with artwork and liner notes. Robinson said, "I'm close to living in my car. Which is to say: We spent money on this so you could spend some money on this."

Black Face released one 7", "I Want to Kill You / Monster", on November 25, 2011, through Hydra Head Records.
