= Lotus Eaters (band) =

American experimental electroacoustic group

- Origin: United States
- Genres: Drone ambient Experimental; Electroacoustic
- Years active: 1999–present
- Labels: Troubleman Unlimited
- Members: Aaron Turner; Stephen O'Malley; James Plotkin

Lotus Eaters is an experimental electroacoustic group which features Aaron Turner (Hydra Head Records, Isis, Old Man Gloom, House of Low Culture), Stephen O'Malley (Sunn O))), Khanate, Burning Witch), and James Plotkin (Atomsmasher, O.L.D.).

Their first release was a very limited edition LP/CD-R called Alienist on a Pale Horse, released by Double H Noise Industries. They later released a CD called Mind Control for Infants on Neurot Recordings, an untitled 7" on Drone Records from Germany, and a very limited self-released CD-R called 4 Demonstrations. Their latest album is a CD released in mid-2007 on Troubleman Unlimited named Wurmwulv. "Mind Control for Infants" was expanded, remixed and reissued on 2xLP in November 2009 via TAIGA records of Minneapolis.

== Discography ==
- Alienist on a Pale Horse (CD & LP 2001)
- Four Demonstrations (CD 2001)
- DR-55 (7" 2002)
- Mind Control for Infants (CD 2002) (remixed/reissued 2xLP 2009)
- Wurmwulv (CD 2007)
