= Planets of Old =

EP by Cave In
- Released: July 19, 2009
- Recorded: October 2008
- Studio: Camp Street Studios in Cambridge, Massachusetts
- Genre: Metalcore; progressive metal
- Length: 14:35
- Label: Hydra Head
- Producer: Adam Taylor

Cave In chronology
| Perfect Pitch Black (2005) | Planets of Old (2009) | White Silence (2011) |

Professional ratings
Review scores
| Source | Rating |
|---|---|
| Drowned in Sound | (8/10) |
| Pitchfork | (6.0/10) |

Planets of Old is an extended play released by American alternative rock band Cave In. This EP is the first release of new material from the band since their split in 2006. Additionally, this is the first Cave In release to feature Adam McGrath on lead vocals (on "The Red Trail").

== Recording and release ==
Cave In intended to record and release an EP rather than a full-length album so that any new material could be quickly recorded and released. Planets of Old was originally made available at Cave In's reunion show on July 19, 2009 and was later made available to the general public on July 28, 2009 through Hydra Head Records. The song "Retina Sees Rewind" was released on July 8, 2009 on iTunes. Planets of Old was originally exclusive to 12" vinyl, but was later released on CD in January 2010. The CD version includes a DVD featuring the live performance from Cave In's reunion show on July 19, 2009. Some versions also included a limited edition CD featuring audio from the same live show.

== Track listing ==
=== Planets of Old CD/LP ===
All songs written by Cave In.

1. "Cayman Tongue" – 6:40
2. "Retina Sees Rewind" – 2:30
3. "The Red Trail" – 2:14
4. "Air Escapes" – 3:11
5. "Retina Sees Rewind" (Japanese bonus track) – 2:49

=== Live at Great Scott DVD ===
1. "Luminance"
2. "Retina Sees Rewind"
3. "Moral Eclipse"
4. "Juggernaut"
5. "Dark Driving"
6. "The Red Trail"
7. "Cayman Tongue"
8. "Trepanning"
9. "Air Escapes"
10. "Summit Fever"
11. "Vicious Circles"
12. "Big Riff"
13. "Inflatable Dream"

== Personnel ==
Album and DVD personnel as listed in CD liner notes.

=== CD and LP ===
Cave In

- Stephen Brodsky – vocals, guitar
- Caleb Scofield – vocals, bass guitar
- Adam McGrath – vocals, guitar
- John-Robert Conners – drums

Production and art

- Recorded and mixed at Camp Street Studios in Cambridge, Massachusetts on October 8 and 15, 2008
- Adam Taylor – engineer
- Johnny Northrup – assistant engineer
- Alex Hartman – assistant engineer
- Nick Zampiello – mixing at New Alliance East in Boston, Massachusetts
- Aaron Turner – drawings and construction

=== DVD ===
Filming and production

- Recorded live at Great Scott on July 19, 2009
- Joe Constantine – camera, editing
- Carly Carioli – technical assistance
- Ryan Stewart – technical assistance
- Matt Sutton – live sound
- Nick Zampiello – live mix
- Reid Haithcock – photography
- A. Dernavich – poster design

Additional notes

- "Retina Sees Rewind (demo)" recorded at Club Awesome in September 2008
- "Segue 4" recorded at 4 Imrie Road #3 in Allston, Massachusetts in 1998
