= Zozobra (band) =

American heavy metal band

- Origin: Santa Fe, New Mexico, U.S.
- Genres: Post-metal, sludge metal
- Years active: 2006–2018
- Labels: Hydra Head, Brutal Panda
- Spinoff of: Cave In, Old Man Gloom
- Members: Adam McGrath; JR Connors
- Past members: Caleb Scofield
- Website: www.facebook.com/ZozobraOfficial

Zozobra was an American sludge metal band that was first conceived by Caleb Scofield during 2006. He was joined by Santos Montano for the band's first release, Harmonic Tremors, in 2007. Early Zozobra recordings had a lot in common with the experimental-hardcore of Old Man Gloom and symbolically shares a synonymous name. Zozobra toured the United States with Isis and Jesu in early 2007.

Zozobra allowed Caleb Scofield the chance to write his own songs for the first time ever, unlike Cave In and Old Man Gloom.

Their second album, Bird of Prey, was released on August 5, 2008, and featured Aaron Harris of Isis on drums. Their third full-length, Savage Masters, was released on April 2, 2013.

Scofield died on March 28, 2018, but contributors to the band's recordings have played multiple live sets of Zozobra songs as a tribute to Scofield.

== Members ==
Current members

- Adam McGrath (Cave In, Clouds, Bodega Girls) – guitar, vocals (2007, 2012–present)
- JR Conners (Cave In) – drums (2012–present)

Past member

- Caleb Scofield (Cave In, Old Man Gloom) – vocals, bass, guitar (2006–2018; died 2018)

Session/touring musicians

- Santos Montano (Old Man Gloom, Forensics) – drums on Harmonic Tremors, live drums (2007–2008)
- Aaron Harris (Isis, Palms) – drums on Bird of Prey
- Jim Carroll (Clouds, Pure Love, United Nations, The Hope Conspiracy) – live guitar, vocals (2007)
- Stephen Brodsky (Cave In) – live bass, vocals (2008)

== Discography ==
- Harmonic Tremors (Hydra Head Records, 2007)
- Bird of Prey (Hydra Head, 2008)
- Savage Masters (Brutal Panda Records, 2013)
