= Mare (band) =

- Origin: Toronto, Ontario, Canada
- Genres: Post-metal; Sludge metal Jazz fusion
- Years active: 2004–2007, 2015–present
- Label: Hydra Head
- Past members: Tyler Semrick-Palmateer; Caleb Collins; Rob Shortil; Scot

Mare were a Canadian band from Toronto, who fused sludge metal with more experimental traits such as jazz, unusual time signatures and Gregorian chant. Mare, consisted of Tyler Semrick-Palmateer on vocals and guitar, Rob Shortil on bass, and Caleb Collins on drums. The band recorded and released several demos, one of which was re-issued by Hydra Head Records in 2004 as an EP. They also contributed a cover of the track "Night Goat" on the We Reach: The Music of the Melvins compilation.

In 2015, Caleb and Tyler reformed the band as a two-piece.

The band played at Prague Death Mass in 2023.

== Discography ==
- Self Titled EP (2004/Hydra Head Records)
