= Perfect Pitch Black =

Studio album by Cave In
- Released: September 13, 2005
- Recorded: January 2003 – April 2004
- Studio: New Alliance Studio; (Boston, MA); Mad Oak Studios; (Allston, MA)
- Genre: Post-hardcore; alternative metal; metalcore
- Length: 41:38
- Label: Hydra Head (HH666-103)
- Producer: Cave In; Andrew Schneider

Cave In chronology
Antenna (2003)	Perfect Pitch Black (2005)	Planets of Old (2009)

Perfect Pitch Black is the fourth studio album by American rock band Cave In. The album was released on September 13, 2005 through Hydra Head Records, and was the band's final release before going on hiatus in 2006. Cave In later reformed in 2009 and released the EP, Planets of Old.

== Background ==
For the band's third studio album, Antenna, the band left Hydra Head Records and signed with major label RCA Records. Members later claimed they were disappointed by the experience (despite the album gaining positive reviews) citing too much time and money spent on making the album, and too much control over the music from RCA. The band started writing heavier songs that incorporated more of Cave In's earlier sound, but RCA refused to release the album and wanted little to do with the songs the band had been recording. RCA Records granted Cave In ownership rights of the songs they had already recorded and dropped the band from the label in September 2004. Originally unsure of how to release the album, Cave In later signed back to Hydra Head Records to release Perfect Pitch Black.

Lyrically, several songs on Perfect Pitch Black vent about the band's frustrations with their major label stint. According to guitarist and vocalist Stephen Brodsky, the act of trepanning is to drill a hole in the skull to alleviate stored up pressure in the brain, and the song "Trepanning" lyrically "fully expresses our sentiment at the time of this song-writing period."

Brodsky has noted that some of the songs feature a "boogie feel", something he attributes to the band listening to ZZ Top's 1976 album Tejas in their tour van, while some of the dueling guitar parts were inspired by the Allman Brothers.

The songs "Down the Drain" and "Droned" were originally released on Bootleg CD by Cave In during spring 2003, and "Trepanning" was originally released in 2004 on a SXSW Hydra Head sampler (demo version), a Daymare Recordings sampler and a Deathwish Inc. sampler.

== Reception ==
Professional ratings
Review scores
Source	Rating
The Encyclopedia of Popular Music	3/5 stars
LambGoat	8/10
laut.de	3/5 stars
Melodic	3/5 stars
Ox-Fanzine	9/10
Pitchfork	7.3/10
PopMatters	8/10
Punknews.org	3.5/5 stars
Stylus	B−

Perfect Pitch Black was generally well received by music critics upon its initial release. Summing up the review for LambGoat, writer Sean Lioselle said, " This is an odd duck - but not something completely out of left field. I can't think of a label more suited to release this than Hydra Head - it's pissed, it's slow, it's fairly weird. If you've ever appreciated Cave In's eclectic side and subtlelty, I don't fathom any disappointment. If you're looking for one of the forefathers of technical metallic hardcore - they're there, but you're going to have to look for it." Contributor Cory D. Cyrom was also somewhat positive in an assessment for Pitchfork, concluding "Each of Cave In's albums to date has marked a distinct shift and change of approach, and Perfect Pitch Black's strength lies with their ability to seamlessly intertwine their past and present, experimenting with a diverse array of progressive genres and styles while remaining true to their metalcore roots. Granted, this is a far cry from the band's earlier work, and five years on from Jupiter, their creative apex does seem to have come and gone. On the other hand, few bands are capable of weathering so much change while remaining so consistent. Given the obstacles and challenges of their decade-long career, Perfect Pitch Black is a far more rewarding album than Cave In should rightly be capable of producing this late in the game."

Cosmo Lee's article for PopMatters commented on the band's attempt to merge both their earlier music style with their more recent efforts, claiming "Perfect Pitch Black channels the band’s frustration with its major label experience into its most aggressive effort since Jupiter. But it’s a far cry from hardcore punk. Rather, it’s a marriage of Cave In’s heavy and melodic sides. A runner that lifts weights and gains size doesn’t run as agilely as before. Likewise, instead of the tense, brittle freakouts of yore, the grooves here are confident, powerful, swinging." PunkNews reviewer Brian Shultz also commented on the band's attempt at hybridising their sound stating that "Perfect Pitch Black seems more a stopover in Cave In's progression than anything, as it seems to recall a healthy amount of traits from Jupiter along with fits of screaming and growling, the likes of which haven't been audible since 1999's Until Your Heart Stops. Is employing this style an outright attempt to win back fans? Maybe. Is Perfect Pitch Black another intelligent, well-structured and strongly written rock record regardless? Definitely."

== Track listing ==
All songs written by Cave In, except where noted.

No.	Title	Length
1.	"Perfect Pitch Black"	0:32
2.	"The World Is in Your Way"	5:09
3.	"Off to Ruin"	4:38
4.	"Trepanning"	4:07
5.	"Paranormal"	7:02
6.	"Down the Drain"	4:27
7.	"Droned"	2:59
8.	"Ataraxia"	5:26
9.	"Tension in the Ranks"	3:16
10.	"Screaming in Your Sleep"	3:23

Vinyl bonus track

11. "On the Prowl" – 4:08

Japanese bonus tracks

11. "Prognosis" – 4:37
12. "Cave-In" – 4:32 (originally written by Codeine)

Bandcamp Expanded Edition bonus tracks

11. "On the Prowl" – 4:08
12. "Believe in Doubt" – 2:33
13. "Prognosis" – 4:34
14. "The World Is in Your Way" (instrumental demo) – 5:37
15. "Trepanning" (instrumental demo) – 4:16
16. "Paranormal" (instrumental demo) – 6:37
17. "Tensions in the Ranks" (instrumental demo) – 3:03
18. "Screaming in Your Sleep" (instrumental demo) – 3:00
19. "Prognosis" (instrumental demo) – 4:38 (mistitled as "Believe in Doubt" on Bandcamp)
20. "Believe in Doubt" (instrumental demo) – 3:05 (mistitled as "Prognosis" on Bandcamp)
21. "Ataraxia" (Stephen Brodsky demo) – 1:50
22. "Believe in Doubt" (Stephen Brodsky demo) – 2:41

== Personnel ==
Album personnel and recording history as listed in CD liner notes.

=== Cave In ===
- Stephen Brodsky – guitar, vocals
- John-Robert Conners – drums
- Adam McGrath – guitar
- Caleb Scofield – bass, vocals

=== Production and recording ===
- Cave In – production
- Andrew Schneider – production, engineering, mixing
- Nick Zampiello – mastering at New Alliance East in Boston, Massachusetts
- Track 6 and 7 recorded at New Alliance in January 2003
- Tracks 2, 4, 5, 9 and 10 recorded at Mad Oak Studios in Allston, Massachusetts in January 2004
- Track 3 and 8 recorded at New Alliance in April 2004
- Additional recording on tracks 2–5, 9 and 10 at Translator Audio in Brooklyn, New York in April 2005
- All songs mixed in May 2005 at Translator Audio except track 6 mixed in January 2004 at New Alliance and track 8 mixed in April 2004 at New Alliance

=== Art and design ===
- Aaron Turner – drawings and layout construction
- Adam McGrath – photographs
- Pete Stahl – photographs
- "A random European fan" – photographs
