= Until Your Heart Stops =

Studio album by Cave In
- Released: May 29, 1998 (Krazy Fest)
- Recorded: April 26 – May 16, 1998
- Studios: God City Studio; Allston, Massachusetts
- Genre: Metalcore
- Length: 54:37
- Labels: Hydra Head (HH666-31)
- Producers: Kurt Ballou; Cave In

Cave In chronology
Beyond Hypothermia (1998)	Until Your Heart Stops (1998)	Creative Eclipses (1999)

Professional ratings
Review scores
Source	Rating
AllMusic	4.5/5 stars
Blistering	10/10
The Encyclopedia of Popular Music	3/5 stars
Stylus	B+

Until Your Heart Stops is the debut studio album by metalcore band Cave In. It was released by Hydra Head Records, with the first cassette copies available at Krazy Fest on May 29, 1998. Until Your Heart Stops has been regarded as a landmark release in the metallic hardcore genre. In 2020, John Hill of Loudwire included the album in his list of the "Top 25 Metalcore Albums of All Time."

== Background ==
Despite being the band's second full-length release, Until Your Heart Stops represents the first time Cave In went into a studio to record a full album together. The album also marks the first time they would play as a four-piece, as it was recorded amid a major line-up change, going through two vocalists and one bassist.

The actual writing of the album took place during the recording sessions of Cave In's previous release, compilation Beyond Hypothermia, a collection of Cave In's older songs, which they re-tracked and, in some cases, re-recorded.

According to guitarist Adam McGrath, Until Your Heart Stops was influenced by Cable, Rorschach, and, most notably, Converge. Frontman Stephen Brodsky has gone as far as to describe the album as "Converge worship".

== Musical style ==
Until Your Heart Stops has primarily been described as a metalcore album. The album also features influences from other musical genres such as emo, noise, and space rock.

== Deluxe edition ==
On February 17, 2023, Cave In announced a deluxe edition reissue of Until Your Heart Stops. This edition features a remastered album version, previously unreleased demos, and alternative takes. The deluxe edition was released on March 31, 2023, through Relapse Records.

== Track listings ==
All tracks are written by Cave In, except where noted.

CD edition
No.	Title	Writer(s)	Length
1.	"Moral Eclipse"		2:05
2.	"Terminal Deity"		3:13
3.	"Juggernaut"		5:35
4.	"The End of Our Rope Is a Noose"		8:09
5.	"Segue 1"	Stephen Brodsky	1:17
6.	"Until Your Heart Stops / Segue 2"	Brodsky ("Segue 2")	8:08
7.	"Halo of Flies"		5:00
8.	"Bottom Feeder / Segue 3"	Brodsky ("Segue 3")	2:52
9.	"Ebola"		4:21
10.	"Controlled Mayhem Then Erupts"		13:57
Total length:			54:37

- "Controlled Mayhem Then Erupts" features a hidden noise track after an unlisted segue track.

Japanese edition bonus track
No.	Title	Length
11.	"Mr. Co-Dexterity"	6:35
Total length:		64:33

2000 Relapse Records re-release, the first 4 tracks from the Creative Eclipses EP
No.	Title	Writer(s)	Length
11.	"Luminance"		4:16
12.	"Sonata McGrath"		1:50
13.	"Magnified" (Failure cover)	Ken Andrews, Greg Edwards	2:57
14.	"Burning Down the Billboards"		1:38
Total length:			59:11

- "Controlled Mayhem Then Erupts" does not contain the hidden noise track on this version.

=== LP edition ===
Side One
No.	Title	Length
1.	"Moral Eclipse"	2:19
2.	"Terminal Deity"	3:14
3.	"Juggernaut"	5:36

Side Two
No.	Title	Writer(s)	Length
1.	"Until Your Heart Stops"		8:07
2.	"Segue 1"	Brodsky	1:15
3.	"The End of Our Rope Is a Noose"		8:09

Side Three
No.	Title	Length
1.	"Informing the Octopus"	1:22
2.	"Bottom Feeder"	2:53
3.	"Halo of Flies"	4:59

Side Four
No.	Title	Writer(s)	Length
1.	"Ebola"		4:21
2.	"Controlled Mayhem Then Erupts"		4:41
3.	"Segue 3"	Brodsky	3:04
4.	"Casio Killtoy"		4:11

- "Informing the Octopus" and "Casio Killtoy" are LP exclusive bonus tracks.
- "Until Your Heart Stops" still contains "Segue 2;" however, it is unlisted.
- "Bottom Feeder" still contains what is listed as "Segue 3" on the CD, but is also unlisted.
- The unlisted segue track on the CD after "Controlled Mayhem Then Erupts" is labelled as "Segue 3" on the vinyl version. However, it does not feature the hidden noise track afterwards.

=== 2023 Deluxe Edition ===
No.	Title	Writer(s)	Length
1.	"Moral Eclipse" (2023 Remaster)		2:05
2.	"Terminal Deity" (2023 Remaster)		3:13
3.	"Juggernaut" (2023 Remaster)		5:35
4.	"The End of Our Rope Is a Noose" (2023 Remaster)		8:09
5.	"Segue 1" (2023 Remaster)	Brodsky	1:17
6.	"Until Your Heart Stops" (2023 Remaster)		8:08
7.	"Halo of Flies" (2023 Remaster)		5:00
8.	"Bottom Feeder" (2023 Remaster)		2:53
9.	"Ebola" (2023 Remaster)		4:21
10.	"Controlled Mayhem Then Erupts" (2023 Remaster)		7:46
11.	"Moral Eclipse" (4 Track Demo)		2:01
12.	"Terminal Deity" (4 Track Demo)		3:18
13.	"Juggernaut" (4 Track Demo)		5:47
14.	"The End of Our Rope Is a Noose" (4 Track Demo)		7:22
15.	"Until Your Heart Stops" (4 Track Demo)		5:37
16.	"Bottom Feeder" (4 Track Demo)		1:40
17.	"Halo of Flies" (4 Track Demo)		5:02
18.	"Controlled Mayhem Then Erupts" (4 Track Demo)		5:09
19.	"Terminal Deity" (God City Demo)		3:13
20.	"Juggernaut" (God City Demo)		5:34
21.	"Until Your Heart Stops" (God City Demo)		4:54
22.	"Ebola" (God City Demo)		4:29
23.	"N.I.B." (Black Sabbath cover; Dave Lead Vox – God City Demo)	Geezer Butler, Tony Iommi, Ozzy Osbourne, Bill Ward	4:30
24.	"N.I.B." (Black Sabbath cover; Steve Lead Vox – God City Demo)	Butler, Iommi, Osbourne, Ward	4:30
25.	"Casio Killtoy" (2023 Remaster)	Brodsky	3:21
26.	"Millipede" (2023 Remaster)		2:23
27.	"Informing the Octopus Part I" (2023 Remaster)		1:31
28.	"Informing the Octopus Part II" (2023 Remaster)		6:09
29.	"Juggernaut" (Stereo Test)		0:33
30.	"Mr. Co-Dexterity" (4 Track Demo)		6:43

== Personnel ==
Cave In

- Stephen Brodsky – vocals, guitar, keyboards
- Adam McGrath – guitar, vocals
- Caleb Scofield – bass
- J.R. Conners – drums, keyboards

Additional

- Kurt Ballou (Converge) – guitar, percussion, vocals, engineer, producer
- Jacob Bannon (Converge) – vocals, design, artwork
- Jay Randall (Agoraphobic Nosebleed) – vocals
- Travis Shettel (Piebald) – vocals
- Dave Merullo – mastering
- Dave Gatinella – concept
- Grail Mortillaro – photography

2023 Deluxe Edition

- Dave Scrod – vocals (tracks 20–23)
