= Jupiter (Cave In album) =

Studio album by Cave In
- Released: August 8, 2000
- Recorded: February–March, 2000
- Genre: Alternative rock; space rock; progressive rock; post-hardcore
- Length: 44:10
- Label: Hydra Head (HH666-52)
- Producer: Brian McTernan

Cave In chronology
Creative Eclipses (1999)	Jupiter (2000)	Tides of Tomorrow (2002)

Professional ratings
Review scores
Source	Rating
AllMusic	4.5/5 stars
Brave Words & Bloody Knuckles	8/10
The Encyclopedia of Popular Music	4/5 stars
Kerrang!	4/5 stars
Pitchfork	4.9/10

Jupiter is the second full-length album by alternative metal band Cave In, released in summer 2000. It marked a change in the band's style, as this album saw the band move away from its previous hardcore sound by starting to experiment with more elements of space rock and psychedelic rock. "Big Riff" was the only song on the album to contain screamed vocals.

There are four different tints to the album cover: green (initial release), magenta (second press), blue (third press), and yellow (fourth press).

In December 2009, Decibel magazine named Jupiter the second-best metal album of the decade. In 2020, it was named one of the 20 best metal albums of 2000 by Metal Hammer magazine.

== Track listing ==
All tracks are written by Cave In.

No.	Title	Length
1.	"Jupiter"	3:17
2.	"In the Stream of Commerce"	5:28
3.	"Big Riff"	6:54
4.	"Innuendo and Out the Other"	6:11
5.	"Brain Candle"	3:28
6.	"Requiem"	9:02
7.	"Decay of the Delay"	4:15
8.	"New Moon"	5:42

Tour Edition CD 2
No.	Title	Length
1.	"Stained Silver" (demo; recorded in Washington D.C. Nov/Dec 2001)	4:11
2.	"Bigger Riff" (demo; recorded in Washington D.C. Nov/Dec 2001)	3:45
3.	"Brain Candle" (album version, extra drumstick clicks at end)	3:29

2006 Japanese release bonus tracks. Includes the Creative Eclipses EP and track from a Bad Brains tribute album.
No.	Title	Length
9.	"Luminance"	4:16
10.	"Sonata McGrath"	1:49
11.	"Magnified" (Failure cover)	2:54
12.	"Burning Down the Billboards"	1:37
13.	"Sonata Brodsky"	7:33
14.	"I Love I Jah" (Bad Brains cover)	9:05

Anomalies Vol. 3 (2014 Bonus LP)
No.	Title	Length
1.	"Dazed and Confused" (Led Zeppelin cover)	10:41
2.	"Day Trader" (demo)	3:41
3.	"Seafrost" (demo)	7:07

2014 Bandcamp Remaster Bonus Tracks
No.	Title	Length
9.	"Big Riff" (live at Quart Fest, 2003)	8:16
10.	"Open G Satellite"	3:44
11.	"Brain Candle Waltz" (different version than released by the Sacrifice Poles, unlisted as such)	3:35
12.	"New Moon" (demo)	4:00

== Personnel ==
- Stephen Brodsky – guitar and vocals
- John-Robert Conners – drums
- Adam McGrath – guitar
- Caleb Scofield – bass guitar and vocals
- Brian McTiernan – producer
