= Cave In =

American rock band

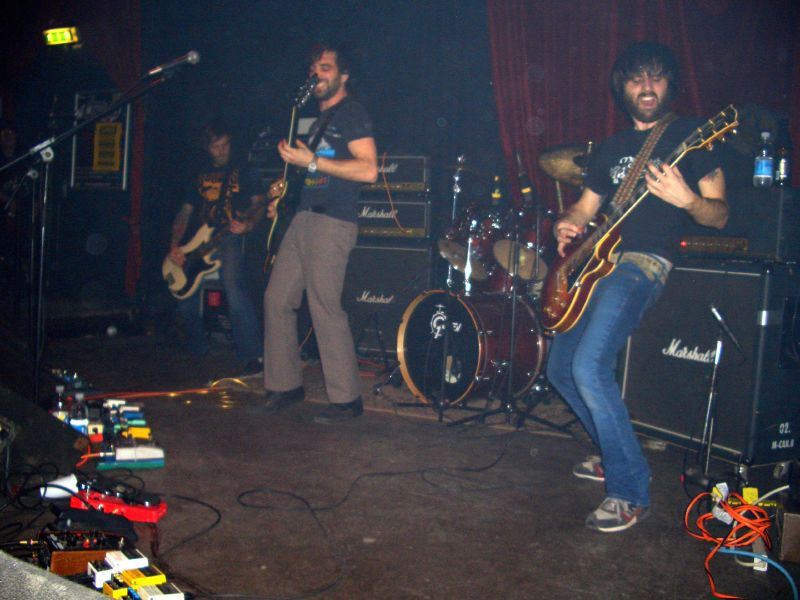
- Cave In in 2006

Background information
- Also known as: The Sacrifice Poles
- Origin: Methuen, Massachusetts, U.S.
- Genres: Metalcore; post-hardcore; alternative rock; progressive rock
- Years active: 1995–2006; 2009–present
- Labels: Relapse; Hydra Head; RCA
- Members: Stephen Brodsky; Adam McGrath; John-Robert Conners; Nate Newton
- Past members: Ben Koller; Caleb Scofield; Jay Frechette; Dave Scrod; Justin Matthes; Andy Kyte; Travis Shettel

Cave In is an American rock band that formed in 1995 in Methuen, Massachusetts. The band's lineup solidified with the 1998 release of Until Your Heart Stops through Hydra Head Records, and their early albums were prominent in the metalcore scene. The band later experimented with other genres, receiving mainstream recognition for their 2003 RCA Records album Antenna and its lead single "Anchor," which had an overall alternative rock style. The group went on hiatus in 2006, later reforming in 2009 with the release of the Planets of Old EP, followed by the White Silence LP in 2011, both of which saw a return to Cave In's earlier and heavier sound.

== History ==
=== Formation and early releases (1995–1998) ===
Cave In was formed by Jay Frechette and Stephen Brodsky in the early spring of 1995, when the two began to write songs in Jay's parents' basement. They named themselves Cave-In as a homage to the Codeine song, Cave-In, from the album Frigid Stars. The initial line-up consisted of Frechette on vocals, Brodsky on guitar and vocals, Adam McGrath on second guitar, JR Conners on drums and Justin Matthes on bass. They would soon release a demo and a handful of split 7-inch releases with bands such as Gambit, Piebald and Early Grace, and see Matthes briefly replaced by Andy Kyte. 1997 saw Cave In's first release; a self-titled 7-inch on Aaron Turner's Hydra Head Records. Following that release, the band embarked on a three-week East Coast tour, with a handful of dates supporting Morning Again and Bird of Ill Omen. That tour was, however, cut a week short due to Jay Frechette's prior obligations to join and tour with Boston-based Ten Yard Fight. After Frechette returned from a month on tour with Ten Yard Fight it was a mutual decision for him to leave Cave In and to join Ten Yard Fight full-time. At this point, Dave Scrod stepped in for a short-lived tenure as interim vocalist. In 1998, most tracks from previous 7-inch releases and recordings were compiled to form Beyond Hypothermia.

=== Until Your Heart Stops and Jupiter (1998–2001) ===
Two weeks before the band was to record their first proper full-length, Scrod left the band, pushing guitarist Stephen Brodsky to a position as vocalist, and Caleb Scofield filled in the then-vacant position on bass. Their 1998 debut studio album Until Your Heart Stops featured Brodsky as lead vocalist. The album's release was followed by extensive touring.

The band toured with Isis in 1999. The tour ended prematurely for Cave In when their 1991 Ford Econoline van caught fire in a rest stop fifty miles away from their destination of Philadelphia.

Before their next full-length, Cave In began experimenting with their sound offering Creative Eclipses, a five-song EP which indicated a space rock direction the band would then pursue for several years, as opposed to their metal roots. Then, in 2000, they released Jupiter, receiving a good deal of press. The band was featured in Spin Magazine's "Sound Advice" section, where their new sound was described as "emo-metal Radiohead", though the band themselves rejected this categorization. Jupiter also caught the attention of major labels, who began courting the band after its release.

=== RCA Records and Antenna (2001–2004) ===
In April 2001, the band signed to RCA Records. In 2002, they recorded and released a six-song EP for Hydra Head, titled Tides of Tomorrow, with an even further-expanded melodic approach. In 2003, the band released Antenna, their debut for RCA. Antenna had more success than previous albums and Cave In was chosen to play the second stage on the 2003 Lollapalooza tour. After Lollapalooza, Cave In toured Europe in support of the Foo Fighters and Muse. The band began to revisit their metal roots during concerts, and started writing heavier material, which ultimately led to a mutual agreement to cut ties with RCA Records shortly after.

=== Perfect Pitch Black and hiatus (2005–2006) ===
Cave In returned to Hydra Head Records and released Perfect Pitch Black on September 13, 2005.

Following the release of Perfect Pitch Black, Conners departed from the band, due to an injury and temporarily relocating to Germany, and was replaced by Converge drummer Ben Koller. With Koller, the band recorded the songs "Shapeshifter" and "Dead Already," which were released as a cassette single that was sold during 2005–2006 tours. According to postings on Hydra Head Records website news, Adam McGrath was temporarily listed as "ex-Cave In guitarist" in his new band Clouds.

In November 2006, Cave In announced that they were officially on hiatus.

=== Reformation, Planets of Old and White Silence (2009–2016) ===
In April 2009, Cave In publicly announced they had ended their more than three-year hiatus. The band recorded a new four-song EP, Planets of Old, that was originally exclusive to vinyl from Hydra Head Records, and first made available at their reunion show on July 19, 2009, at Great Scott's in Allston, Massachusetts. The EP was later released on CD in January 2010 with a bonus DVD of Cave In's reunion show. Two songs from the EP, "Retina Sees Rewind" and "Cayman Tongue", were released through iTunes. Cave In chose to make Planets of Old a short EP instead of a full-length because it was less expensive and faster to record and release. Commenting on the duration of recording, Steve Brodsky stated, "we didn't really wanna make a big deal out of it. In the past, we've had more than a couple instances of spending far too long into making a recording. [...] It was a good exercise for us to give ourselves a very strict amount of time to record and then move on."

Looking forward, Brodsky announced in a January 2010 interview that Cave In will be more selective about their touring schedule, and that future releases from the band might be more focused on a digital medium. Brodsky uploaded a live audio recording of a new song titled "Centered" in July 2010 on YouTube. The song comes from Cave In's recording sessions for an upcoming studio album, and first since Perfect Pitch Black in 2005. The new album White Silence was released on May 24, 2011, through Hydra Head Records.

Shortly after tours in support of White Silence, Cave In entered an undeclared-hiatus state as all of the band members shifted focus on their other respective projects. On December 7, 2014, Cave In performed live for the first time in 3 years, opening for Doomriders' tenth anniversary show.

=== Death of Caleb Scofield and Final Transmission (2017–2020) ===
Cave In engaged in at least two "jam sessions" in late 2017 and early 2018 with "some new stuff in the works," presumably for a planned new release.

On March 28, 2018, Scofield died in a car accident after striking a toll booth on the Everett Turnpike in Bedford, New Hampshire.

The band played and scheduled a series of benefit shows to raise money for Scofield's family, with his brother Kyle Scofield and Nate Newton of Converge covering his parts. Scofield's side project, Old Man Gloom, shared the bill at each event, with Brodsky taking Scofield's place in its lineup. The 2018 shows also featured an encore set of Zozobra songs, performed by a revolving lineup of musicians who had participated in that project.

On January 2, 2019, Cave In announced plans to release a new studio album. The band released its sixth studio album Final Transmission through Hydra Head on June 7, 2019. The album is composed of practice-space demos that all feature contributions from Scofield and were finished with mixing by Andrew Schneider and mastering by James Plotkin.

=== Signing to Relapse and Heavy Pendulum (2021–present) ===
Cave In signed to Relapse Records in July 2021 and released their seventh studio album through the label on May 20, 2022. The album title was revealed in March 2022 as Heavy Pendulum, and the announcement was accompanied by the release of a single titled "New Reality". The album's second single, "Blinded by a Blaze", was released on April 5; the song's music video was released the same day. The third single, "Blood Spiller", was released on April 26. The fourth single, "Reckoning", is the first Cave In song to be fully written by guitarist Adam McGrath and was released on May 10.

== Musical style and influences ==
Cave In's music has been described as metalcore, post-hardcore, and hardcore punk, taking stylistic cues from traditional heavy metal, progressive rock and indie rock. Mark Deming of AllMusic described the band's sound as "music that's as sophisticated as it is hard hitting."

Cave In have drawn from numerous bands and genres of music. Frontman Stephen Brodsky has described Cave In's debut studio album Until Your Heart Stops as "Converge worship". According to Brodsky, the Converge album Halo in a Haystack and Failure's Magnified "[define] the approach of early Cave In". Noting the latter band's influence, Caleb Scofield once stated that "You'll hear 5,000 blatant Failure rip-offs in our stuff". Other notable influences cited by the band include Led Zeppelin, Radiohead, the Beatles, and Soundgarden.

== Members ==
Current members

- Stephen Brodsky – lead guitar (1995–2006, 2009–present), lead vocals (1998–2006, 2009–present), backing vocals (1995–1998), keyboards (1998–1999, 2006–2018), bass (2018–2021)
- Adam McGrath – rhythm guitar (1995–2006, 2009–present), lead vocals (2006–present), backing vocals (1995–2006), keyboards (1997–1999, 2006–2018)
- John-Robert Conners – drums (1995–2005, 2009–present), keyboards (1997–1999), rhythm guitar (2018–2021)
- Nate Newton – bass, backing vocals (2018–present), lead guitar (2018–2021)

Former members

- Jay Frechette – lead vocals (1995–1997)
- Justin Matthes – bass (1995–1997)
- Andy Kyte – bass (1997)
- Dave Scrod – lead vocals (1997–1998)
- Travis Shettel – bass (1998)
- Caleb Scofield – bass, lead and backing vocals (1998–2006, 2009–2018; his death)
- Ben Koller – drums (2005–2006)

== Discography ==
Studio albums

- Until Your Heart Stops (1998)
- Jupiter (2000)
- Antenna (2003)
- Perfect Pitch Black (2005)
- White Silence (2011)
- Final Transmission (2019)
- Heavy Pendulum (2022)

== Side projects ==
- Mutoid Man (Cave In and Converge member side project)
- Kid Kilowatt (Cave In and Converge member side project)
- Old Man Gloom (Caleb Scofield and Nate Newton's side project)
- New Idea Society (Stephen Brodsky's side project)
- Pet Genius (Stephen Brodsky's and J.R. Conners' side project)
- Sacrifice Poles (Cave In's instrumental alter-ego)
- The Octave Museum (Stephen Brodsky's side project)
- Zozobra (Caleb Scofield's side project)
- Clouds (Adam McGrath's side project)
- Stephen Brodsky (Solo projects, also released as Steve Brodsky and Stove Bredsky)
- Nomad Stones (Adam McGrath's and J.R. Connors' side project)
- Marilith (J.R. Connors' side project)
- Adam McGrath solo album Methuen's Lot (2024)
