= Caleb Scofield =

American musician (1978–2018)

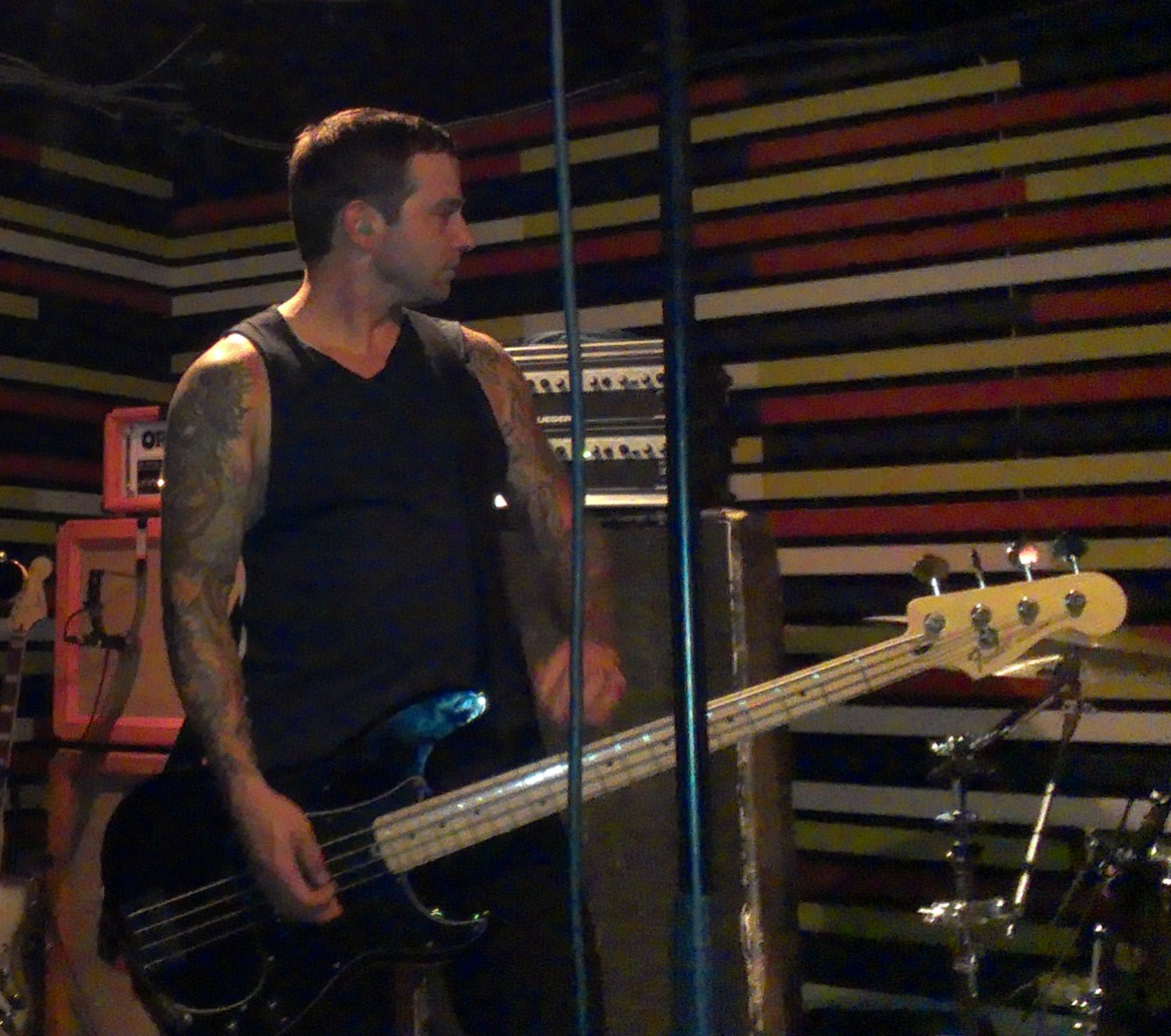

Background information
- Also known as: "Secret C"
- Born: Caleb Mark Scofield; October 6, 1978; Concord, New Hampshire, U.S.
- Died: March 28, 2018 (aged 39) Bedford, New Hampshire, U.S.
- Genres: Alternative rock, metalcore, sludge metal, post-metal, hardcore punk
- Instruments: Bass guitar, vocals, guitar
- Years active: 1996–2018
- Labels: Hydra Head, Profound Lore

Caleb Mark Scofield (October 6, 1978 – March 28, 2018) was an American musician who was a bassist and singer mostly known for the alternative metal band Cave In, and his own sludge metal band Zozobra. He was killed in an auto accident. Scofield was also a part of the sludge band Old Man Gloom.

== Music career ==
Caleb Scofield gained an interest in heavy music through seeing local New Hampshire punk bands like Inline and The Rat, and as soon as he was able to drive, took a trip to Boston to see bigger East Coast hardcore bands like Sheer Terror and Sick of It All. He performed vocals for his first band, local New Hampshire hardcore act Strike 3.

He joined what would become his primary band Cave In in 1998 as a bassist shortly before they released their debut album Until Your Heart Stops. From the band's bio on their website: "Shortly after coming home from the Cave In/Piebald tour, Caleb Scofield gave us a ring. Strike 3 – the band he sang for and the same band we shared a van with during our first east coast tour – had just disbanded. He was offering to play bass for Cave In. It was a surprise to learn that he even played bass – we really had no idea. The real surprise came at our first try-out rehearsal together – he was a closet bass phenom!" After a revolving door of bassists and vocalists in the band's early years, Scofield became a permanent member of the band until his death in 2018.

Zozobra is a rock band that was first conceived by Caleb Scofield during 2006. He was joined by Santos Montano for the band's first release, Harmonic Tremors in 2007. Their second album, Bird of Prey, was released July 28, 2008, once again on Hydra Head Records. It featured Aaron Harris of Isis on drums.

After Scofield's death in 2018, his bands continued to release music that he contributed to as posthumous releases. Hydra Head records released two unreleased Zozobra songs as Unreleased Tracks in 2018, and Cave In released its sixth studio album Final Transmission in 2019 with contributions from Scofield on all tracks.

== Personal life and death ==
Caleb Scofield was born in Concord, New Hampshire, and raised in Pembroke. He graduated from Pembroke Academy in 1997. He moved to Los Angeles and in 2004 married his wife, Jennifer. The couple had two children, Desmond in 2007 and Sydney in 2010. Outside of his music career, Scofield worked as a carpenter and enjoyed camping and CrossFit.

He died on March 28, 2018, of "smoke and heat inhalation, thermal injuries and multiple blunt impact injuries," after his pickup truck crashed into a concrete barrier at a toll booth in Bedford, New Hampshire. The severity of the accident and burns on the body made it difficult for first responders to determine identity, or even sex. Scofield was 39 years old. As a result of the accident, local officials began considering a US$20 million Everett Turnpike project to upgrade its toll booths to electronic tolls for safety reasons. Scofield's memorial service was held on April 4, 2018.

Following news of his death, prominent figures in the metal community showed their support, including members of Converge, Jesu, Every Time I Die, The Red Chord and Isis, among others. A YouCaring crowdfunding page was established to collect donations for Scofield's memorial service. The initial goal of $1,000 was quickly surpassed and reached about $72,000 in 24 hours, while continuing to raise funds in the following weeks. Hydra Head Records released a fundraising package deal with all proceeds going to his family, which included a special reissue set of Zozobra's Harmonic Tremors and Bird of Prey, a two-song cassette EP of unreleased Zozobra tracks and an Old Man Gloom tribute shirt. Cave In and Old Man Gloom hosted two fundraising shows with 100% of the proceeds going to Scofield's family—a Boston show on June 13, 2018, with Converge, Young Widows and a reunited The Cancer Conspiracy; and a Los Angeles show on October 13, 2018, with Pelican, 27 and Celestial (a one-off reunion of the band Isis under a different name). Filling in on bass for Cave In, Old Man Gloom and Zozobra songs at the Boston benefit show was Nate Newton of Converge, Stephen Brodsky, and Scofield's brother Kyle. Half the proceeds of Cave In's 2019 album Final Transmission was donated to Scofield's family.

== Discography ==
=== Cave In ===
- Until Your Heart Stops (1998)
- Jupiter (2000)
- Antenna (2003)
- Perfect Pitch Black (2005)
- White Silence (2011)
- Final Transmission (posthumous release) (2019)

=== Old Man Gloom ===
- Seminar II: The Holy Rites of Primitivism Regressionism (2001)
- Seminar III: Zozobra (2001)
- Christmas (2004)
- No (2012)
- The Ape of God (2014)
- Seminar IX: Darkness of Being (posthumous release) (2020)
- Seminar VIII: Light of Meaning (posthumous release) (2020)

=== Zozobra ===
- Harmonic Tremors (2007)
- Bird of Prey (2008)
- Savage Masters (2013)
- Unreleased Tracks (posthumous release) (2018)

=== Guest musician ===
Year	Artist	Album	Track
2001	Converge	Jane Doe	"The Broken Vow"
2006	Isis	In the Absence of Truth	"1,000 Shards"
2007	The Ocean	Precambrian	"Orosirian: For the Great Blue Cold Now Reigns"
