= Stephen Brodsky =

American rock musician (born 1979)

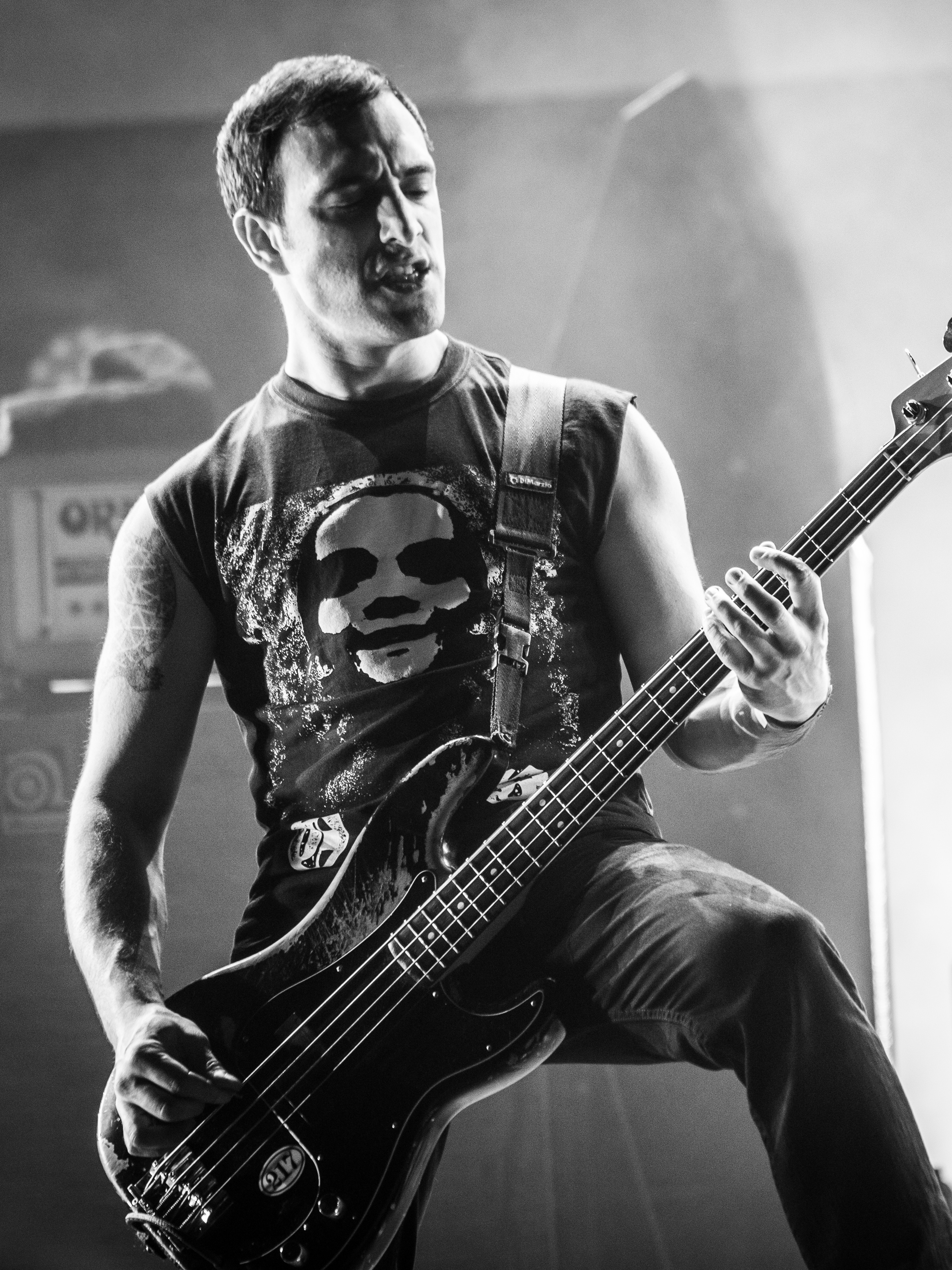
- Brodsky in 2019

Background information
- Also known as: Stove Bredsky
- Born: April 9, 1979 (age 47); Boston, Massachusetts, U.S.
- Genres: Metalcore; hardcore punk; post-hardcore; mathcore; experimental metal; progressive rock
- Instruments: Guitar; bass guitar; vocals
- Labels: Hydra Head; Magic Bullet; Relapse Records; Sargent House; Epitaph Records; RCA Records
- Member of: Cave In; Mutoid Man; Old Man Gloom; Quicksand
- Formerly of: Converge; Kid Kilowatt; New Idea Society; Pet Genius; Parasite
- Website: stephenbrodsky.com

Stephen Brodsky (born April 9, 1979) is an American rock musician, best known as a member of Cave In, Mutoid Man, New Idea Society, Old Man Gloom, and Quicksand. He also has a solo career and is a former member of Converge, Kid Kilowatt, Parasite and Pet Genius.

== History ==
Stephen Brodsky was born in Boston, Massachusetts and grew up in Methuen, Massachusetts. He has cited Slash as a major influence in his interest in the guitar. He played in his first band in middle school, a two-piece called Parasite that featured drummer John-Robert Conners. In early 1995, Brodsky formed the metallic hardcore band Cave In with Jay Frechette. By the time Cave In recorded their debut studio album Until Your Heart Stops, Brodsky was joined by Conners, Caleb Scofield and Adam McGrath.

In the late 1990s, Brodsky worked on several other music endeavors outside of Cave In. In 1997, he joined Converge after the departure of bassist Jeff Feinburg. He performed on the band's 1998 album When Forever Comes Crashing and was later replaced by Nate Newton. Brodsky, while still in high school and also a member of Cave In and Converge, was a member of the indie rock band Kid Kilowatt. The band also featured Converge guitarist Kurt Ballou, Cave In bassist Adam McGrath, Piebald guitarist Aaron Stuart and drummer Matt Redmond. Brodsky began his solo career with the release of his debut album Expose Your Overdubs in 1999.

In the early 2000s, Brodsky continued making solo work and releasing music with his main band Cave In. He also co-founded the band New Idea Society with guitarist Mike Law.

In 2006, after Cave In went on hiatus, Brodsky formed the alternative rock band Pet Genius with Cave In drummer John-Robert Conners and bassist Johnny Northrup of Clouds. The short-lived band released the Elvis Unreleased EP and a self-titled album through Hydra Head in 2007. In 2008 Brodsky released a solo LP entitled "The Black Ribbon Award" under the pseudonym Stove Bredsky.

Cave In ended its hiatus in 2009 and released the Planets of Old EP in 2009 and White Silence in 2011. After Cave In returned to a period of inactivity, Brodsky moved to New York City and released a solo EP titled Hit or Mystery in 2013 and formed a new band titled Mutoid Man with Converge drummer Ben Koller. Mutoid Man released an EP titled Helium Head in 2013, and released its first full-length album Bleeder on June 30, 2015.

After the death of Caleb Scofield in 2018, Brodsky began filling in for him at Old Man Gloom's benefit shows and would become an official member of the band later that year.

April 2019 saw him release the Droneflower project, a collaboration between himself and Marissa Nadler. In September 2021 Brodsky joined the post-hardcore band Quicksand for their live tour in support of their album Distant Populations. In November 2021 he was a part of the first Converge Bloodmoon release alongside Chelsea Wolfe.

After 11 years in Greenpoint, Brooklyn, Brodsky returned to Massachusetts. He is a regular contributor to the heavy-metal comedy series Two Minutes to Late Night.

== Discography ==
=== Solo ===
- Expose Your Overdubs (1999)
- Olé Sunday (2001)
- Octave Museum (2006)
- Stephen Brodsky/Ramona Cordova (Split EP) (2006)
- The Black Ribbon Award (credited as Stove Bredsky) (2008)
- A Shoebox Tuneful (EP) (2009)
- Here's to the Future (2010)
- Hit or Mystery (EP) (2013)
- Droneflower (with Marissa Nadler) (2019)

=== Cave In ===
- Until Your Heart Stops (1998)
- Jupiter (2000)
- Antenna (2003)
- Perfect Pitch Black (2005)
- White Silence (2011)
- Final Transmission (2019)
- Heavy Pendulum (2022)

=== Converge ===
- When Forever Comes Crashing (1998)
- Unloved and Weeded Out (select tracks) (2003)
- Axe to Fall (guitar on "Effigy") (2009)
- Bloodmoon: I (with Chelsea Wolfe) (2021)

=== New Idea Society ===
- New Idea Society (EP) (2002)
- You Are Awake or Asleep (2005)
- The World Is Bright and Lonely (2007)
- Quiet Prism (EP) (2010)
- Somehow Disappearing (2010)
- Fire on the Hill (2026)

=== Kid Kilowatt ===
- Guitar Method (2004)

=== Pet Genius ===
- Elvis Unreleased (EP) (2007)
- Pet Genius (2007)

=== Mutoid Man ===
- Helium Head (EP) (2013)
- Bleeder (2015)
- War Moans (2017)
- Mutants (2023)

=== Old Man Gloom ===
- Seminar IX: Darkness of Being (2020)
- Seminar VIII: Light of Meaning (2020)

=== Quicksand ===
- Bring On the Psychics (2026)

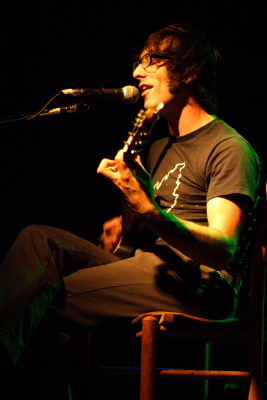
Brodsky in 2007
