= Hydra Head Records =

Defunct US record label

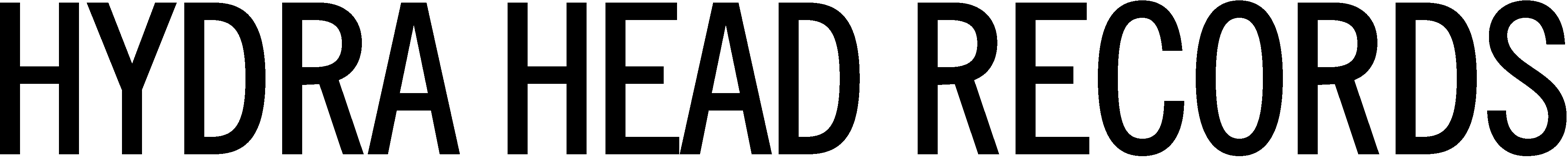
- Founded: 1993
- Founder: Aaron Turner
- Defunct: 2020
- Status: Defunct
- Distributor: Redeye Distribution
- Genre: Extreme metal; hardcore punk; experimental; noise; industrial
- Country of origin: U.S.
- Location: New Mexico
- Official website: www.hydrahead.com

Hydra Head Records was an independent record label specializing in extreme metal music, founded in New Mexico by Aaron Turner (the frontman of Isis) in 1993. It had another imprint, Hydra Head Noise Industries, which specialized in experimental and noise music. Turner announced he was winding the label down in 2012. In 2020, the label removed its catalog from Spotify and returned its album rights back to several artists.

== History ==
Hydra Head was founded in 1993 as a distribution company while Turner was still in high school. In 1995, he moved to Boston to attend art school. In late 1995, he was handed a demo by Wichita Kansas band Vent. That seven-inch single would be the first record released on Hydra Head. The label grew to accommodate local bands such as Roswell, Corrin, Piebald, and Converge, and after Turner graduated from college in 1999, it became a full-time endeavor. In 2011, Hydra Head relocated to Los Angeles, California, from its former home in Boston, Massachusetts.

Some of the bands signed to the label include Cave In, Xasthur, Kayo Dot, Boris, and Jesu. Its discography includes Botch, Khanate, and Harkonen, who were active at the time of their signings.

On September 11, 2012, Turner announced the "imminent demise of Hydra Head Records", stating that Hydra Head would take its first steps into shutdown "this December, at which point we are cutting off new releases from the label." The label would continue to stay operational, maintaining its back catalogue to pay off its "rather sizeable debts." The label released Worship is the Cleansing of the Imagination, a split album between JK Flesh & Prurient.

The Hydra Head office in Los Angeles was closed in May 2013.

In 2017, Hydra Head released Oxbow's Thin Black Duke, a long-germinating album that was slated to come out on Hydra Head and had been unable to find another label since Hydra Head's winding down. Discussing the album, Turner appeared open to releasing more albums "on a case-by-case basis". However, in a 2018 interview, Turner expressed disinterest in doing Hydra Head as a full-time label again, saying that "...it would mean me stopping a lot of other things that I’m currently doing, and I don’t want to do that."

The label released Final Transmission by Cave In, released on June 7, 2019.

In 2020, the label's catalogue was removed from Spotify, and the album rights to several of the label's bands were given back to the artists. Several artists such as Cave In, Discordance Axis and Botch signed with other record labels such as Relapse, Willowtip and Sargent House, respectively, to help reissue their back catalogs. A press release on Botch's signing with Sargent House stated that Hydra Head folded in 2020.

As of April 2022, the label continued to sell its remaining stock via Bigcartel.com.

== Current roster ==
- 27
- Agoraphobic Nosebleed
- The Austerity Program
- Big Business
- Black Face
- Boris
- Cable
- Cave In
- Cavity
- Craw
- Dälek
- Daughters
- Discordance Axis
- Drawing Voices
- Everlovely Lightningheart
- Greymachine
- Gridlink
- Harkonen
- Harvey Milk
- Helms Alee
- Heresi
- Jesu
- Kayo Dot
- Keelhaul
- Khanate
- Khlyst
- Knut
- Logh
- Lotus Eaters
- Lustmord
- Mamiffer
- Merzbow
- Nihill
- The Octave Museum
- Oxbow
- Pet Genius
- Phantomsmasher
- Pyramids
- Torche
- Xasthur
- Zozobra

=== Tortuga ===
- The Gersch
- Old Man Gloom
- Scissorfight
- 5ive
- Tusk

== Past artists ==
- The Abandoned Hearts Club
- Age of Reason
- Barbaro
- Botch
- Boxer Rebellion
- Buzzov*en
- Cattlepress
- Coalesce
- Converge
- Corrin
- Cult of Luna
- The Dillinger Escape Plan
- Drowningman
- Isis
- Jesuit
- Kid Kilowatt
- Mare
- Miltown
- Neurosis
- Pelican
- Piebald
- Roswell
- Seven Day Curse
- Six Going on Seven
- SOHNS
- Soilent Green
- Sunn O)))
- The Hollomen
- The Never Never
- These Arms Are Snakes
- Today Is the Day
- Unionsuit
- Vent

== See also ==
- Hydra Head Records discography
- Southern Lord Records
