= Jonah Jenkins =

American vocalist (born 1970)

- Born: Jonah Moore; October 6, 1970 (age 55); Litchfield, New Hampshire, United States
- Origin: Boston, Massachusetts, United States
- Genres: Hardcore punk; heavy metal; alternative rock
- Occupations: Singer, songwriter
- Years active: 1987–present

Jonah Jay Jenkins (born Jonah Moore, October 6, 1970) is an American vocalist, known for his work with bands such as Only Living Witness, Miltown, Milligram, The Northern Skulls and Raw Radar War.

== Biography ==
Born Jonah Moore, his sister is Kassie Carlson, the vocalist for Guerilla Toss.

Jenkins formed Only Living Witness with Eric Stevenson, of Formicide in 1989. The band performed in 14 countries including Sweden, England, France, Canada, Italy, Switzerland and the Czech Republic. When Only Living Witness split up in 1995, Jenkins went on to form two bands, Miltown and Milligram. Miltown was signed by Larry Jacobson to Irving Azoff's Giant Records, aka Revolution Records. Miltown recorded several demo tapes on their own with guitarist/producer Brian McTernan and guitarist Matt Squire, releasing a CDEP (Hydra Head Records) and two 7-inch vinyl records, and one album for Revolution Records, with producer Toby Wright which was never released, and the group subsequently split.

Jenkins then returned to work with Milligram, releasing two albums, Hello Motherfucker!, and This Is Class War on three different labels: Tortuga Recordings, Overcome Records, and Small Stone Records.

In 2001, Jenkins contributed lyrics and vocals for the song "Stockholm (Blues)" on 5ive's Continuum Research Project's album The Telestic Disfracture, also on Tortuga Recordings. In 2002, Jenkins formed Raw Radar War (formerly Septic Youth Command), and also started a record label, TRAKTOR7 Records, releasing albums by Milligram, Crash and Burn, Lamont, The Hidden, Waltham, Blacktail, Quintaine Americana, Morgan Knockers, and Black Helicopter. In 2005, Jenkins contributed vocals on two songs to Crash and Burn's album The Value of Mistrust.

In 2006, Jenkins sang on 36 Crazyfists's album, Rest Inside The Flames, on the track "We Cannot Deny". The same year he performed vocals on Converge's album, No Heroes for the track "Grim Heart/Black Rose". In 2008, Jenkins appeared as a guest vocalist on one track of Ehnahre's debut album, The Man Closing Up.

In 2008, Only Living Witness briefly reformed to perform four reunion shows. In 2011, Milligram reformed to play at Worcester Palladium with the Kyuss Lives! Tour in Worcester, Massachusetts.

In March 2017, Raw Radar War recorded with Glenn Smith for the Death Kiss Radio Show CD release, Volume One of a series.

On April 20, 2018, The Northern Skulls (with Jenkins on vocals) digitally released a single called "Eyes Are Why".

On August 15, 2025, Miltown announced the release, after 28 years of the album "Tales Of Never Letting Go" on Man Alive/Rhino Record, release date September 5, 2025.

== Discography ==
- 1987 : A Graphic Eulogy - unreleased demo cassette

With Blind Surgeon

- 1989 : A Welcome Change unreleased demo cassette

With Only Living Witness

- 1990 : self-titled demo cassette (4 songs)
- 1990 : Planned Obsolescence compilation (RRRecords)
- 1990 : Complex Man 7-inch (Look Again Records) limited press of 1000 copies
- 1992 : Prone Mortal Form demo cassette Slipt Disc Records (the label's only release)
- 1992 : East Coast Assault compilation (Too Damn Hype Records)
- 1993 : Prone Mortal Form CD (Century Media Records)
- 1994 : Bloodlines: The Seeds of Rebellion compilation (Century Media Records)
- 1994 : Case Closed?: An International Compilation of Husker Du Cover Songs (Snoop Records)
- 1995 : Boston Hardcore '89-'91 (Taang! Records)
- 1995 : Freaklaw 7-inch limited press of 3000 copies (Chainsaw Safety Records)
- 1996 : Innocents CD (Century Media Records)
- 2006 : Prone Mortal Form/Innocents CD re-issue (Century Media Records)
- 2008 : Prone Mortal Form/Innocents double gatefold vinyl re-issue limited pressing of 500 copies (Reflections Records)
- 2018 : Prone Mortal Form vinyl re-issue, limited pressing of 500 copies (Think Fast! Records)
- 2024 : Prone Mortal Form double gatefold vinyl re-issue, including PMF demos
- 2024 : Innocents double gatefold vinyl re-issue, including Innocents demos

With Miltown

- 1997 : Miltown s/t 7-inch limited pressing of 1000, some colored vinyl (Hydra Head Records)
- 1997 : Miltown/Cast Iron Hike split 7-inch limited pressing of 1000, on Hatin' Life Records, operated by Joanie Lindstrom, DJ on (WMBR)'s Late Risers Club
- 1997 : Miltown s/t CDEP (Hydra Head Records)
- 1997 : They Came From Massachusetts compilation (Big Wheel Recreation)
- 1998 : Tales of Never Letting Go unreleased (Revolution Records)
- 1999 : Up The Dosage compilation (Wonderdrug Records)
- 2025 : Tales of Never Letting Go limited vinyl release Man Alive Creative / (Rhino Entertainment)

With Milligram

- 1999 : Milligram/Quintaine Americana split 7-inch (Polterchrist Records) limited pressing of 300 copies, colored vinyl
- 2000 : Hello Motherfucker! EP (Tortuga Recordings in the USA, Overcome Records in France)
- 2001 : Hello Motherfucker! CD (re-issue) (Tortuga Recordings in the USA, Overcome Records in France)
- 2001 : Black and White Rainbow CD, the HMF! companion CD package (Tortuga Recordings)
- 2001 : Music With Attitude: Volume 31 compilation (Rock Sound)
- 2002 : This Is Class War CD (TRAKTOR7 Records) limited pressing of 300 copies, hand sewn into camouflage pockets
- 2002 : Milligram s/t 7-inch (Superfi Records) limited pressing of fewer than 400 copies
- 2002 : Sucking The 70's compilation (Small Stone Records)
- 2003 : This Is Class War CD re-released (Small Stone Records)

With Raw Radar War

- 2007 : == 12-inch vinyl, limited pressing of 500 copies (Land o' Smiles)
- 2007 : == CD (TRAKTOR7 Records/Shifty Records)
- 2007 : Raw Radar War/Deer Creek split 12-inch vinyl (limited press of 500, colored vinyl) and CD (Game Two Records)
- 2007 : Pharmacopoeia: Volume One 7-inch vinyl box set compilation (with Coffins, Misanthrope Project, Kongh, Deadbird, Fistula, Noosebomb, Ravens Creed, Witch Lord, and Fossegrimen) limited pressing of 250 box set copies (Land o' Smiles)
- 2007 : Raw Radar War/Deadbird 7-inch vinyl limited pressing of 50 copies
- 2010 : This Is Good compilation (covers of Black Flag, with Unearthly Trance, Fistula, Deathcrawl, Sollubi, etc.) limited edition of 98 copies, on cassette only (Land o' Smiles]
- 2011 : "On A Field Of White" 7-inch" (Chainsaw Safety Records)
- 2017: "Death Kiss, Volume 1" compilation CD and online
- 2022: "Form Disarrays" unreleased full length album

With The Northern Skulls

- 2018 : The Northern Skulls - "Eyes Are Why" [Single]
- 2019 : The Northern Skulls - "The Northern Skulls [EP], six songs on colored vinyl, with three numbered prints of Jenkins's artwork, limited pressing of 500

As guest

- 2001 : Telestic Disfracture - 5ive's Continuum Research Project
- 2005 : Value of Mistrust - Crash and Burn (Thorp Records)
- 2006 : No Heroes - Converge (Epitaph Records)
- 2006 : Rest Inside The Flames - 36 Crazyfists (Roadrunner Records)
- 2008 : The Man Closing Up - Ehnahre (Sound Devastation Records)
- 2010 : Taming the Cannibals - Ehnahre (Crucial Blast Records)
- 2011 : "The Beast Becomes The Servant" - Motherboar (Born Of Fire Records)
