= Guerilla Toss =

American art rock band

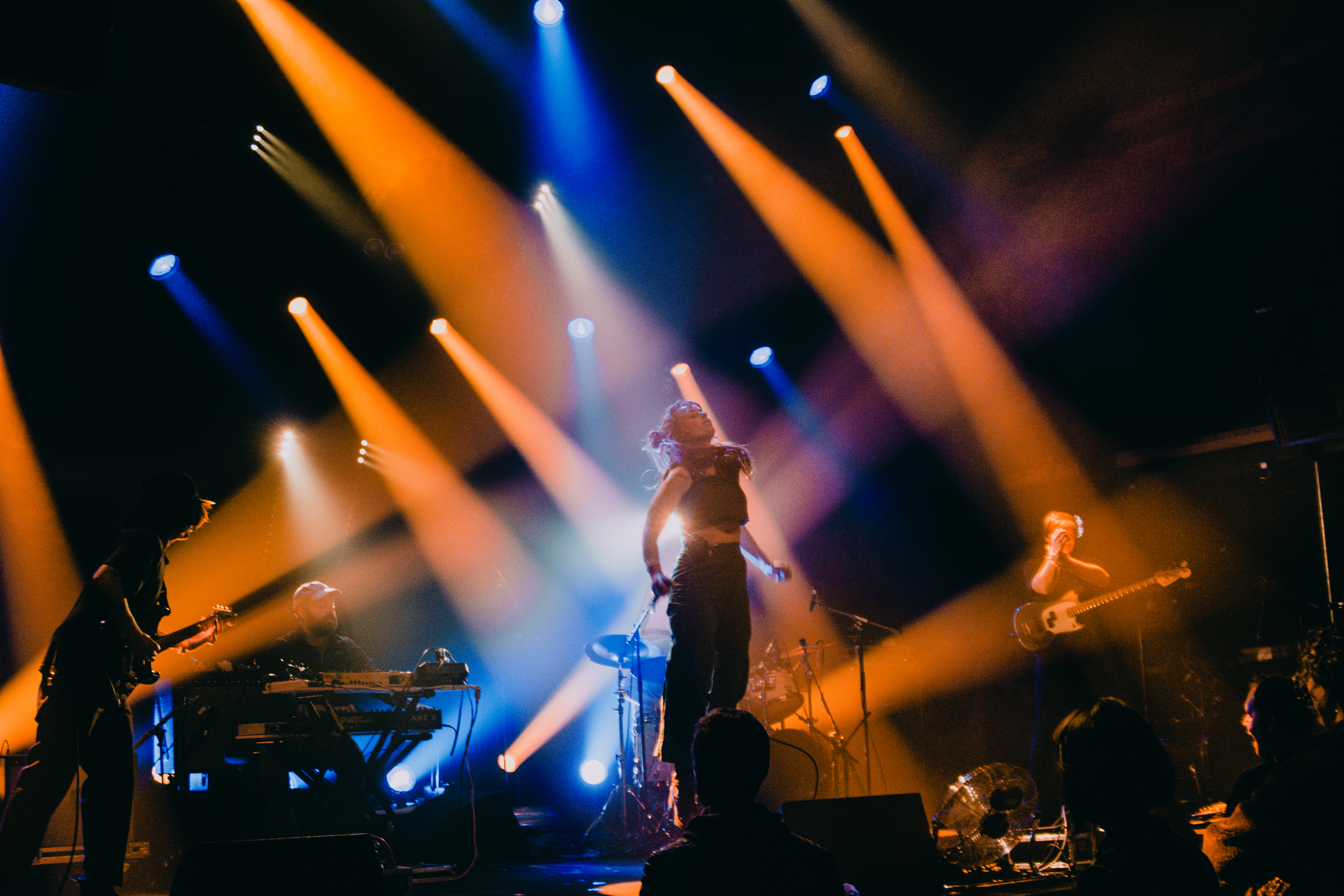
- Guerilla Toss performing in 2022

Background information
- Origin: Boston, MA, United States
- Genres: Dance-punk; neo-psychedelia; art pop; noise rock; space rock; no wave (early); punk rock (early)
- Years active: 2011–present
- Labels: Sub Pop; DFA; Feeding Tube; NNA Tapes; Infinity Cat Recordings; Tzadik Records; Sophomore Lounge; Orange Milk; Grönland Records
- Members: Kassie Carlson; Peter Negroponte; Arian Shafiee; Zach Lewellyn; Jake Lichter
- Website: guerillatoss.com

Guerilla Toss is an American rock band, formed in Boston in 2011. Now based in New York City, the group currently consists of singer Kassie Carlson, drummer Peter Negroponte, guitarist Arian Shafiee, keyboardist Jake Lichter, and bassist Zach Lewellyn. Guerilla Toss has released six studio albums, seven EPs, and three remix albums, on various underground labels, DFA Records and more recently on Sub Pop. They were listed in Rolling Stone magazine as one of the "10 Great Modern Punk Bands" and Henry Rollins has called them "one of the first great bands of the new century".

== History ==
=== Formation and early years (2011–2014) ===
In 2011, Andy Allen and Peter Negroponte formed an early instrumental version of Guerilla Toss that played a mix of free jazz and punk. Singer Kassie Carlson joined the band in 2012, replacing Allen. Carlson first met Guerilla Toss when her former hardcore band, Western Syndrome, performed with the group at a house show. Around this time is when Guerilla Toss' members consider the band to have truly started.

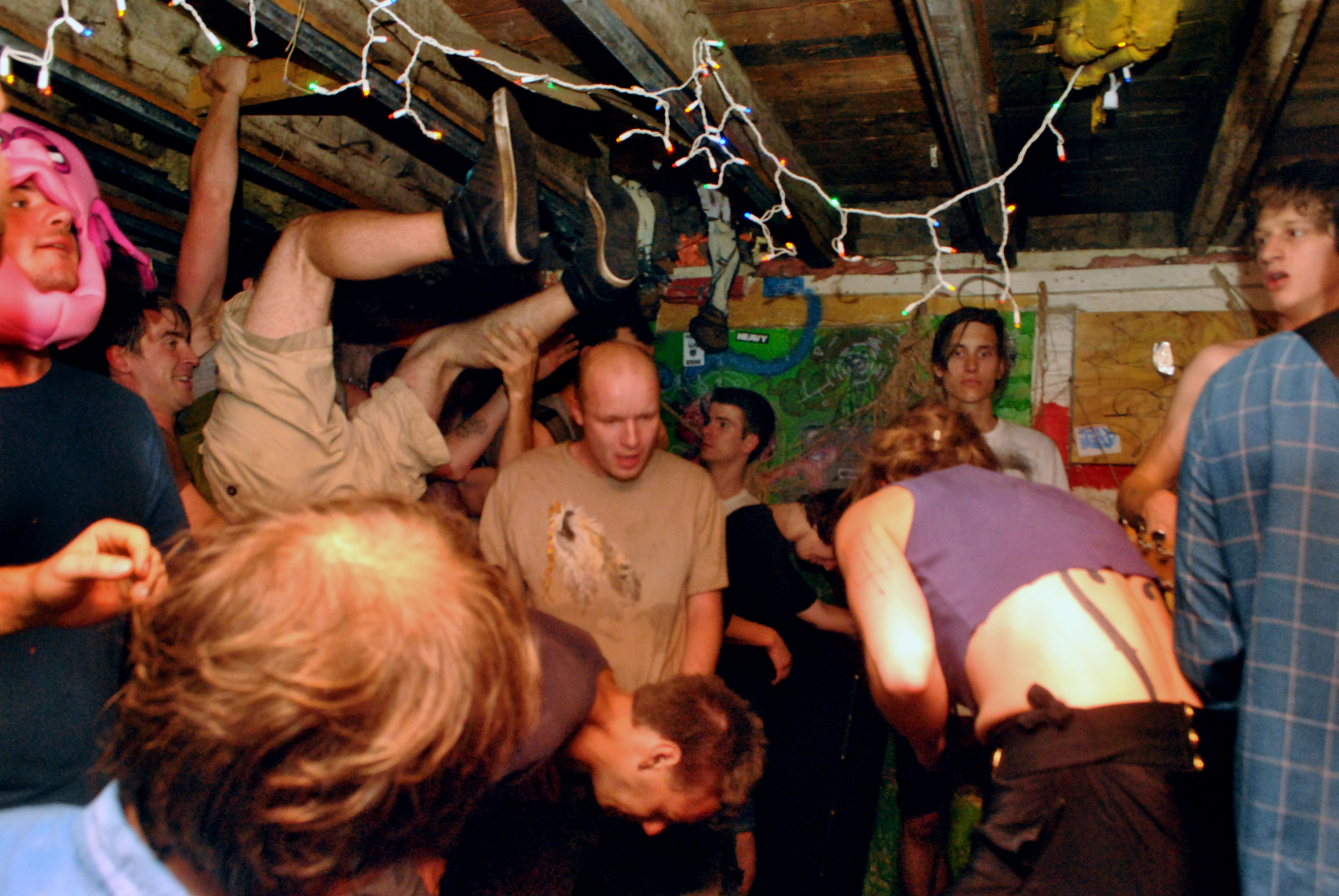
Guerilla Toss performing at Gay Gardens on July 21, 2012. From left to right: Kassie Carlson and Simon Hanes.

Guerilla Toss toured extensively, nationally, and within Boston's DIY community by performing at many show houses such as Gay Gardens, where Carlson and Negroponte were both residents on separate occasions. Later that year Guerilla Toss released Jeffrey Johnson, through Feeding Tube Records.

In May 2013, Guerilla Toss released an EP, GTOSS, through Tzadik Records, the record label owned by avant-garde composer John Zorn. The group then released an EP later that year—Kicked Back into the Crypt, a split LP with noise rock band The Sediment Club that was co-released through Sophomore Lounge Records and Feeding Tube Records

Guerilla Toss began to incorporate disco and funk elements into their sound as shown with the release of their debut LP Gay Disco through NNA Tapes in December 2013. In July 2014, they released their next EP, 367 Equalizer, through Infinity Cat Recordings.

Towards the end of 2014 the band released the EP, Smack The Brick, through NNA Tapes. Guerilla Toss wrapped up the year by going on a US / Europe tour that included the fourth-to-last show at New York City warehouse venue Death By Audio with Thee Oh Sees.

=== Signing to DFA Eraser Stargazer, GT Ultra, Twisted Crystal (2015–2019) ===
Guerilla Toss relocated to New York City during the summer of 2015.

On June 24, 2015, Guerilla Toss opened for seminal Boston post-punk band Mission Of Burma in Portsmouth, New Hampshire. The band's leader, Roger Miller is a self proclaimed fan.

Adding to Guerilla Toss’ growing popularity, Kris Petersen and Jonathan Galkin of DFA Records, the record label co-founded by James Murphy of LCD Soundsystem, signed Guerilla Toss to the label. The band's first release through them was the EP Flood Dosed in October 2015, which was met with some acclaim.

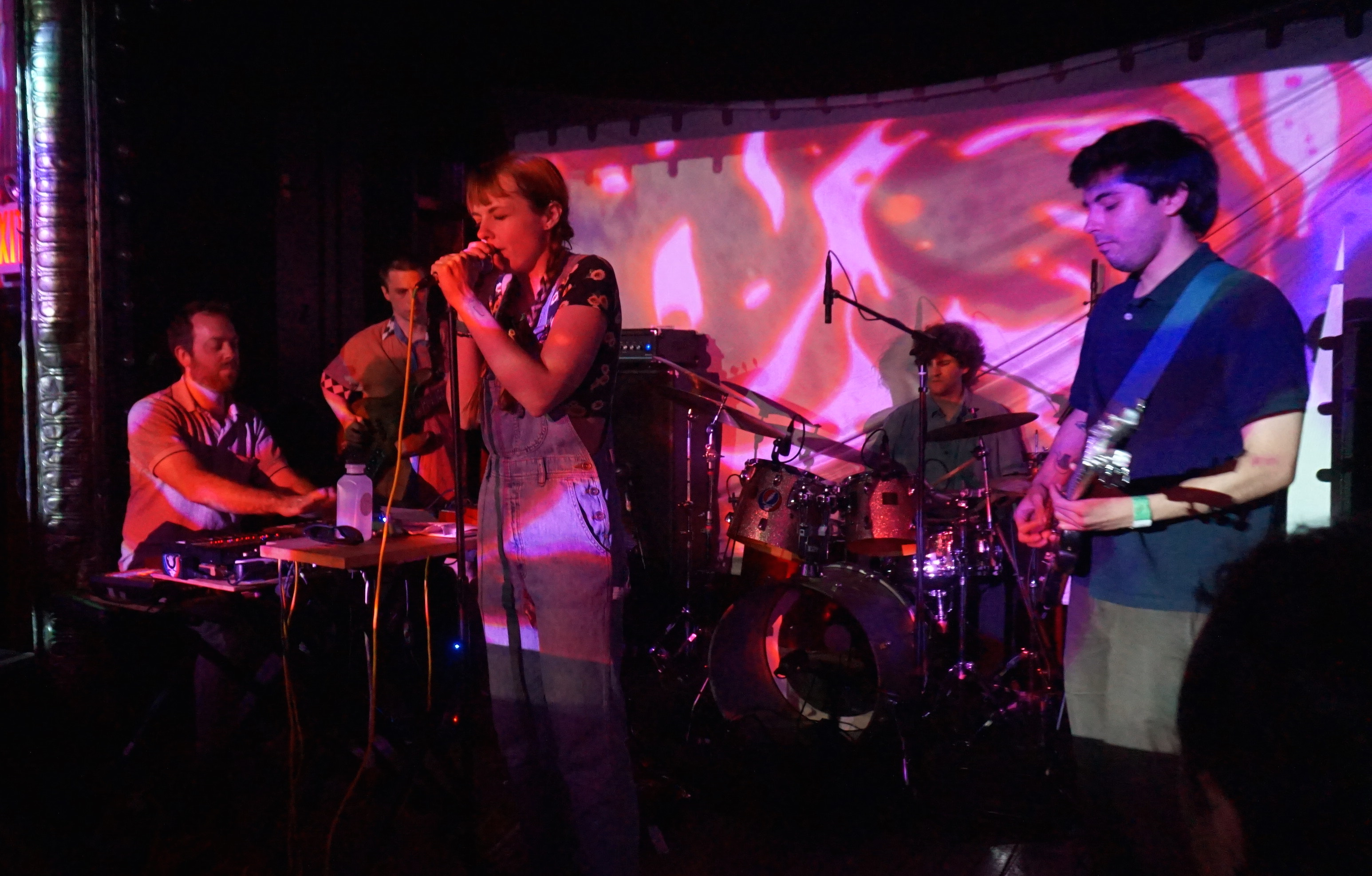
Guerilla Toss performing in Brooklyn, NY at Union Pool in 2018. From left to right: Sam Lisabeth, Stephe Cooper, Kassie Carlson, Peter Negroponte, Arian Shafiee

Around this time, the band began varying their setlists and jamming during their live performances in addition to encouraging tapers to come and check out their shows, citing the Grateful Dead as an inspiration.

In March 2016, Guerilla Toss released their album Eraser Stargazer through DFA Records. Eraser Stargazer was recorded during the winter of 2015 in Livingston Manor, NY.

Guerilla Toss released two more recordings in 2016. One of them was a remix EP of Eraser Stargazer by Giant Claw—who did the artwork for Eraser Stargazer, Live in Nashville, and Gay Disco—titled Giant Claw vs. Guerilla Toss, which was released in May 2016 through DFA Records. The other release was their first live album, Live in Nashville, which was recorded at The End in Nashville, TN on March 11, 2016, during the Eraser Stargazer tour. The album was released in June 2016 on vinyl via Feeding Tube Records and digitally via DFA Records.

In June 2017, Guerilla Toss released GT ULTRA, their second full-length album release on DFA Records. The LP received positive reviews. Popular YouTuber and music critic Anthony Fantano gave the album an 8/10, saying "Thanks to some clearer production, more up-front performances, and a zany new wave influence, GT ULTRA is the most I've ever enjoyed a Guerilla Toss album" and included it on his "Loved List: 2017"

On July 18, 2018, the band released a music video for the song "Meteorological", alongside an announcement on their official Facebook page. The video was produced by giraffestudio and directed by Nicky "Giraffe" and Juliana "Giraffe". Carlson was also part of the video editing process. On the official announcement, that was released alongside an article on Stereogum, where their sixth full-length album, Twisted Crystal, was announced. The album was released on September 14, 2018, with artwork made by Jacob van Loon.

An EP titled What Would The Odd Do? was released on NNA Tapes October 18, 2019. The band continued to tour, opening for Battles in Toronto, Chicago, Brooklyn, and Boston in December 2019.

=== Signing to Sub Pop, Famously Alive (since 2022) ===
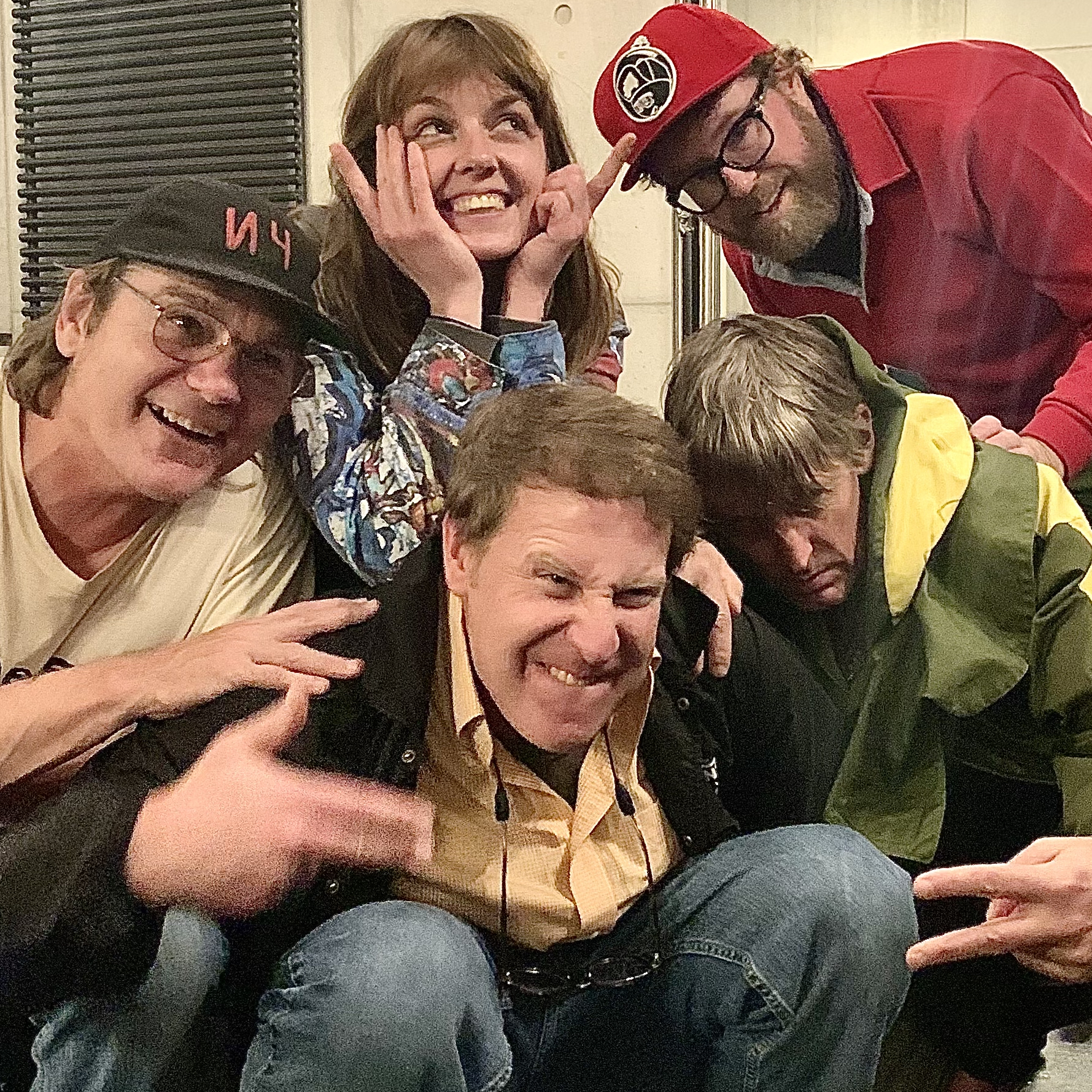
Kassie Carlson with members of Pavement in 2022. From left to right: Mark Ibold, Kassie Carlson, Bob Nastanovich, Steve West, Stephen Malkmus.

On June 15, 2020, the band released 2 songs as part of the Sub Pop 7" club, "Human Girl" and "Own Zone".

In January 2022, Guerilla Toss announced that they had signed to Sub Pop, and released their next album, Famously Alive, through the label on March 25, 2022. They released the album's first single, "Cannibal Capital", on January 12, 2022. The LP received positive reviews. Nick Forté, of the seminal hardcore punk band Rorschach, is credited as co-writing two songs on the album.

Shortly after Famously Alive was released, Stephen Malkmus, who had seen the band perform in 2019, personally asked Guerilla Toss to open for his band Pavement on their 2022 reunion tour. It was announced in May that they would open in San Francisco, Troutdale, and Seattle. They were later added to the Toronto and Boston Pavement shows as well.

In July 2022, Guerilla Toss released the single "Zum Herz" on the official tribute album to Neu!, through Grönland Records.

On October 28, 2022, Guerilla Toss released the single "Heathen Money" on a compilation called "The Eleventh Hour: Songs For Climate Justice", curated by Sub Pop and film director Adam McKay. All of the proceeds from the compilation go to the Climate Emergency Fund.

Guerilla Toss toured extensively throughout the year, playing festivals such as Pickathon, Pitchfork Berlin and Paris, and the Primavera Weekender.

Frequent collaborator and former Guerilla Toss bassist Ben Katzman was a contestant on Survivor 46, which aired in 2024.

On February 20, 2024, it was announced that Guerilla Toss would be opening for Primus and Coheed and Cambria on their summer co-headline tour, with Katzman rejoining the band on second guitar and vocals. The collaborative single with Katzman "Final Vibal" was released in July.

=== You're Weird Now (since 2025) ===
On May 6th, 2025, Guerilla Toss released the single "Psychosis is Just a number". In June 2025, the band announced a North American tour for their upcoming album You're Weird Now. The first single "Red Flag to Angry Bull" was released on June 17th, featuring Phish guitarist Trey Anastasio and Stephen Malkmus, who is credited as producing the album at The Barn. The LP received positive reviews most noticeably by music critic Anthony Fantano, who called it the bands "best work thus far" including it at #4 on his "Top 50 Album of 2025" and #2 on his "Top 5 Rock Albums of 2025" year end lists.

The band finished their tour in December 2025 with 5 east coast dates opening for labelmates Built To Spill.

== Artistry ==
=== Musical style ===
Guerilla Toss's earlier work has been labeled as art rock, no wave, noise rock, and punk, namely for their odd time signatures and dissonant instrumentals. Throughout their DFA years, critics noted the addition of psych, krautrock, new wave, funk and dance music elements to the bands sound, often being compared to artists like Talking Heads, The B-52's, Boredoms, Brian Eno, and Grace Jones. Carlson's vocal style has been compared to that of Lizzy Mercier Descloux, Laurie Anderson, and Kathleen Hanna.

=== Influences ===
Early on in their career, Guerilla Toss considered no wave artists like James Chance and Lydia Lunch, experimental artists like Captain Beefheart, and avant-garde composers like György Ligeti and John Zorn, to be major influences. They have cited artists such as Charli XCX, Andy Stott, Caroline Polachek, Arca, Arthur Russell, and Boards Of Canada as recent influences. The band dubbed the sound of Famously Alive as "Hyper Punk" (a play on the genre of Hyperpop), fusing elements of pop and electronic music into their sound with a maximalist approach. Carlson's older brother is singer Jonah Jenkins of Only Living Witness and Milligram, as well as several other Boston based underground punk and hardcore bands throughout the 90's. He currently sings in the sludge metal / crust punk band Raw Radar War. She grew up watching her brother perform and has stated in several interviews that she considers him an early influence in her development as a musician. Several members of Guerilla Toss are avid fans of The Grateful Dead. Carlson is a DJ for WJFF Radio Catskill and curates a weekly show called Rare Pear Radio, featuring fringe music mostly by queer and female artists.

=== Lyrical themes ===
Carlson's lyrics often deal with subject matter such as substance abuse and recovery, growing up in poverty, religious fanaticism, the psychedelic experience, mental illness, technology, climate change, self motivation, depression and alien abduction. Carlson has said she draws inspiration from multitudes of subjects including contemporary literature like that of Milan Kundera, existentialist literature like that of Hermann Hesse, and cognitive science.

== Members ==
Current

- Kassie Carlson - vocals/violin (2012–present)
- Peter Negroponte - drums (2011–present)
- Arian Shafiee - guitar (2011–present)
- Zach Lewelleyn - bass (2021–present)
- Jake Lichter - keyboards (2024–present)

Current Touring Members

- Ben Katzman - guitar/vocals (2024–present)
- William Dantzler - visuals (2015–present)
- Matthew Mann - visuals (2022–present)
- Watley - dog (2018–present)

Former

- Andy Allen - saxophone (2011)
- Simon Hanes - bass (2011-2014)
- Ian Kovac - keyboards (2011-2014)
- Ben Katzman - bass (2015-2016)
- Stephe Cooper - bass (2018-2021)
- Sam Lisabeth - keyboards (2015-2023)

Former Touring Members

- Borey Shin - keyboards (2011)
- Toby Aronson - keyboards (2014)
- Pat Keuhn - bass (2014)
- Phil Racz - bass (2015)
- Greg Albert - bass (2016-2017)
- Katie McShane - keyboards/vocals (2023)

== Discography ==
Studio albums

- Gay Disco (2013)
- Eraser Stargazer (2016)
- GT Ultra (2017)
- Twisted Crystal (2018)
- Famously Alive (2022)
- You're Weird Now (2025)

EPs

- Jeffery Johnson (2012)
- Kicked Back into the Crypt (2013)
- GTOSS (2013)
- Guerilla Toss (2013)
- 367 Equalizer (2014)
- Smack the Brick (2014)
- Flood Dosed (2015)
- What Would the Odd Do? (2019)

Live albums

- Live in Nashville (2016)

Singles

- "Human Girl"/"Own Zone" (2020)

Remixes

- Giant Claw – "Giant Claw vs. Guerilla Toss" (2016)
- Jay Glass Dubs – "Jay Glass Dubs vs Guerilla Toss" (2017)
- Khotin and Yu Su – "Retwisted Crystal" (2019)

Music videos

- "367 Equalizer" (2014)
- "Doll Face on the Calico Highway" (2016)
- "Perfume" (2016)
- "Color Picture" (2016)
- "The String Game" (2017)
- "Skull Pop" (2017)
- "Betty Dreams of Green Men" (2017)
- "Dose Rate" (2018)
- "Meteorological" (2018)
- "Plants" (2019)
- "Cannibal Capital" (2022)
- "Life's a Zoo" (2025)
