= Only Living Witness =

American metal band

Background information
- Origin: Boston, Massachusetts, U.S.
- Genres: Alternative metal, hardcore punk, stoner rock
- Years active: 1989–1995
- Labels: Look Again, Slipped Disc, Reflections, Chainsaw Safety, Century Media
- Members: Jonah Jenkins; Eric Stevenson; Craig Silverman; Roy Costa
- Past members: Kevin Stevenson; Chris Crowley

Only Living Witness was an American metal band from Boston, Massachusetts, formed in 1989 by members of dissolved thrash metal band Formicide. Across two studio albums, they developed a modern hardcore-influenced metal sound. The band split up in 1995.

== History ==
The band was formed in 1989 in Boston, Massachusetts, by Jonah Jenkins (vocals) and Eric Stevenson (drums, ex-Formicide). Stevenson's brother Kevin (guitar) and former Formicide bandmate Roy Costa (bass) completed the lineup. In 1991, Kevin Stevenson and Costa were replaced by Craig Silverman and Chris Crowley. Kevin Stevenson and Costa went on to form The Shods.

Only Living Witness released a few demos before being signed by Century Media Records. Their debut album, Prone Mortal Form, was released in 1993. The band performed concerts in 14 countries including Sweden, England, France, Canada, Italy, Switzerland, and the Czech Republic. In 1996, their follow-up CD Innocents was released, but the band had already split up.

Following the band's dissolution in 1995, Jonah Jenkins went on to perform the vocal duties in Miltown, Milligram and Raw Radar War. Guitarist Craig Silverman went on to play in bands Blood for Blood, Ramallah, Slapshot, and Agnostic Front.

Only Living Witness briefly reformed in 2008 for four reunion shows: June 14 and 21 at The Middle East in Cambridge, Massachusetts, August 22 in Clinton, Massachusetts, and the final show on August 30 in Eindhoven, Netherlands.

Eric Stevenson, the band's main composer and drummer, died on August 9, 2011, at the age of 43.

== Legacy ==
Only Living Witness would prove to be influential to the wave of metalcore acts that also came out of Massachusetts some years later, like 36 Crazyfists, Killswitch Engage, Shadows Fall and Unearth.

In 2014, Shadows Fall's cover of the Only Living Witness song "December" was used in the soundtrack of the film Let's Be Cops.

== Members ==
- Jonah Jenkins – vocals (1989–1995)
- Eric Stevenson – drums (1989–1995)
- Kevin Stevenson – guitar (1989–1991)
- Roy Costa – bass (1989–1991)
- Craig Silverman – guitar (1991–1995)
- Chris Crowley – bass (1991–1995)

US Reunion, Clinton, MA and Netherlands show 2008

- Bob Maloney – bass guitar

Clinton, MA and Netherlands show 2008

- Benny Grotto – drums

== Discography ==
Year	Album
1993	Prone Mortal Form: Released: 1993; Label: Century Media Records; Released: 2018; Label: Think Fast! Records (vinyl re-issue)
1996	Innocents: Released: 1996; Label: Century Media Records
2006	Prone Mortal Form/Innocents (re-released): Released: 2006; Label: Century Media Records (CD re-issue); Released: 2008; Label: Reflections Records (vinyl re-issue)

=== Demos ===
1990
Self-titled demo (audio cassette)

No.	Title	Length
1.	"Complex Man"	3:55
2.	"Dying System"	4:31
3.	"Corruption of Power"	2:57
4.	"Bad Blood"	2:32
Total length:		13:57

1992
Prone Mortal Form demo (audio cassette)

No.	Title	Length
1.	"Prone Mortal Form"	5:12
2.	"Twitching Tongues"	3:03
3.	"Window 4:45"	4:45
4.	"Nineveh"	5:29
5.	"Slug"	4:30
Total length:		22:59

=== Singles ===
1991

- Complex Man 7" limited press of 1,000 copies (Look Again Records)

Side A
No.	Title	Length
1.	"Complex Man"	3:58

Side B
No.	Title	Length
1.	"Dying System"	4:35
2.	"Bad Blood"	2:34
Total length:		11:07

1995

- Freaklaw 7" limited press of 3,000 copies (Chainsaw Safety Records)

Side A
No.	Title	Length
1.	"Freaklaw"	2:48

Side B
No.	Title	Length
1.	"Some Will Never Know"	4:04
Total length:		6:52

== Compilation appearances ==
1991

- Planned Obsolescence compilation (RRRecords)

Have contributed with the track "Bad Blood"

1993

- East Coast Assault compilation (Too Damn Hype Records)

Have contributed with the track "Twitching Tongues"

1994

- Case Closed?: An International Compilation of Husker Du Cover Songs (Snoop Records)

Have contributed with the track "Too Far Down"

1995

- Bloodlines: The Seeds of Rebellion compilation (Century Media Records)

Have contributed with the track "Deed's Pride"

- Boston Hardcore '89–'91 (Taang! Records)

Have contributed with the track "Bad Blood"
