= Ben Carr =

Ben or Benjamin Carr may refer to:

- Ben Carr, actor in High Fidelity (film)
- Benjamin Carr, musician
- Ben Carr (politician), Canadian politician

== See also ==
- 5ive (American band) and The Mighty Mighty Bosstones, musical acts with unrelated members named Ben Carr.
