= Balls Deep =

Balls Deep may refer to:

- Balls Deep (album), an album by Scissorfight
- Balls Deep (TV series), a documentary series airing on Viceland
