= Prone Mortal Form =

Studio album by Only Living Witness
- Released: May 21, 1993
- Recorded: February 1993
- Studio: Fort Apache Studios, Cambridge, Massachusetts
- Genre: Heavy metal, hardcore punk, alternative metal, stoner Metal
- Length: 35:28; 50:23 (European digipak)
- Label: Century Media
- Producer: Tim O'Heir

Only Living Witness chronology
Prone Mortal Form (1993)	Innocents (1996)

Professional ratings
Review scores
Source	Rating
AllMusic	3/5 stars

Prone Mortal Form is the first album by American metal band Only Living Witness. It was released on May 21, 1993 on CD and audio cassette. A European digipak was also released, which added a cover song of Hüsker Dü and three bonus tracks (from the Complex Man 7" single). Blabbermouth.net described it as combining influences from hardcore punk, the Seattle sound, and early Helmet.

== CD version ==
Track listing

No.	Title	Length
1.	"Prone Mortal Form"	5:17
2.	"Root"	3:17
3.	"Voice of Disrepair"	4:54
4.	"Silo"	1:18
5.	"VTA (Veracity, Tenacity and Aspirin)"	2:01
6.	"Slug"	4:03
7.	"Twitching Tongues"	3:39
8.	"Nineveh"	4:35
9.	"Darkly"	1:39
10.	"December"	4:45
Total length:		35:28

European digipak bonus tracks
Track listing

No.	Title	Length
11.	"Too Far Down" (Hüsker Dü cover)	3:48
12.	"Complex Man"	3:58
13.	"Dying System"	4:35
14.	"Bad Blood"	2:34
Total length:		50:23

== Audio cassette version ==
Side A
No.	Title	Length
1.	"Prone Mortal Form"	5:17
2.	"Root"	3:17
3.	"Voice of Disrepair"	4:54
4.	"Silo"	1:18
5.	"VTA (Veracity, Tenacity and Aspirin)"	2:01

Side B
No.	Title	Length
6.	"Slug"	4:03
7.	"Twitching Tongues"	3:39
8.	"Nineveh"	4:35
9.	"Darkly"	1:39
10.	"December"	4:45
Total length:		35:28

== Personnel ==
Only Living Witness

- Jonah Jenkins – vocals
- Craig Silverman – guitars
- Chris Crowley – bass guitar
- Eric Stevenson – drums

Additional musicians

- Jon Key – bass
- John Burnstead – cello
- Trisha Mathews – violin

Production

- Tim O'Heir – producer, engineer, mixing
- Greg Fulginiti – mastering
