= Innocents (Only Living Witness album) =

Studio album by Only Living Witness
- Released: February 27, 1996
- Recorded: August 14 to August 26, 1995
- Studios: Fort Apache Studios, Cambridge, Massachusetts
- Genre: Heavy metal
- Length: 39:12
- Label: Century Media
- Producers: Tim O'Heir; Eric Stevenson

Only Living Witness chronology
Prone Mortal Form (1993)	Innocents (1996)	Prone Mortal Form/Innocents (2006)

Professional ratings
Review scores
Source	Rating
AllMusic	3/5 stars

Innocents is the second and final album by American metal band Only Living Witness. It was released on February 27, 1996, on CD and audio cassette, while the band broke up in 1995.

== CD version ==
No.	Title	Length
1.	"No Eden"	3:59
2.	"Knew Her Gone"	3:41
3.	"Deed's Pride"	3:16
4.	"Placid Hill"	1:47
5.	"Some Will Never Know"	4:16
6.	"Strata"	3:32
7.	"Freaklaw"	2:59
8.	"Hank Crane"	5:04
9.	"Downpour"	4:12
10.	"Total Particle Reversal"	6:26
Total length:		39:12

== Audio cassette version ==
Side A
No.	Title	Length
1.	"No Eden"	3:59
2.	"Knew Her Gone"	3:41
3.	"Deed's Pride"	3:16
4.	"Placid Hill"	1:47
5.	"Some Will Never Know"	4:16

Side B
No.	Title	Length
6.	"Strata"	3:32
7.	"Freaklaw"	2:59
8.	"Hank Crane"	5:04
9.	"Downpour"	4:12
10.	"Total Particle Reversal"	6:26
Total length:		39:12

== Personnel ==
Only Living Witness

- Jonah Jenkins – vocals
- Craig Silverman – guitars
- Chris Crowley – bass guitar
- Eric Stevenson – drums
