= The Ape of God / The Ape of God =

- Cover art for The Ape of God (PFL145)

Studio album by Old Man Gloom
- Released: November 11, 2014
- Recorded: December 2013 & June 2014
- Studios: GodCity Studios (Salem, MA); HOLC (Vashon, WA)
- Genres: Sludge metal, post-metal
- Length: PFL145: 43:40; PFL145.5: 46:49
- Labels: Profound Lore, SIGE
- Producer: Kurt Ballou

Old Man Gloom chronology
No (2012)	The Ape of God / The Ape of God (2014)	Seminar VIII: Light of Meaning (2020)

Related artwork
- Cover art for The Ape of God (PFL145.5)

The Ape of God is the name of three different studio albums released by the American rock band Old Man Gloom—one of which was a "fake" album released promotionally to music critics and subsequently leaked online, and two of which were officially released to the public making up the band's sixth and seventh studio albums (and are sometimes unofficially disambiguated as The Ape of God I and The Ape of God II). The two publicly released albums were released on November 11, 2014, through Profound Lore Records (digital/CD) and SIGE Records (vinyl)—marking the first time since the band's inception that an album was not released through Tortuga Records and Hydra Head Records. The Ape of God albums were marketed and promoted as a single album for several months, but the weekend before its official release, it was revealed to actually be the name of two separate but identically titled studio albums and was also revealed that the version that some music critics had reviewed and leaked only featured edited-down versions of songs from both albums.

The "fake" promo version of The Ape of God albums was subject to critical acclaim; however, the fact that Old Man Gloom had deceived members of the press to prevent the leak of their albums was very negatively received, and angered several journalists.

== Writing and recording ==
The Ape of God albums were recorded in two separate recording sessions with Converge guitarist and long-time producer for Old Man Gloom, Kurt Ballou. The first took place in December 2013 and the second took place in June 2014. The band felt that previous albums had heavier metal songs jarringly "cut and pasted" in between softer ambient songs, and set out to make these two opposing parts more "interwoven" together on The Ape of God albums. The writing process for both albums was described as "extremely quick" by drummer Santos Montano since all members are busy with other bands, and that most of what ended up being recorded was "almost entirely spontaneous." Montano also said Ballou wasn't involved with the writing process at all, and his input in the studio was relatively minimal.

== Release and promotion ==
Old Man Gloom announced that they began work on their follow up to their 2012 album No in December 2013. In August 2014, the band formally announced that their new album would be titled The Ape of God and would be released in November through Profound Lore Records digitally and on CD, and through guitarist Aaron Turner's own SIGE Records on vinyl. The album marked the first time in the band's history that an album was not released through Turner's Hydra Head Records and/or its subsidiary Tortuga Records. Turner previously interacted with Profound Lore founder Chris Bruni when the label released albums from his other bands: Isis' live album Live.03 in 2005, and Mamiffer's collaboration with Locrian Bless Them That Curse You in 2012. Turner said he felt Profound Lore would be a good label to release The Ape of God, elaborating: "I felt like it was really the best place for us to be, because Profound Lore is obviously oriented toward heavy music, but I feel like they're pretty broad in their approach. They've definitely got a pretty experimental angle to their output and it just felt like a good place to be. I think [Bruni] got a built-in audience to some degree, and also I feel like he has a broad enough reach where the people who already like us would easily find us through that outlet."

"Our task is not an enviable one — to bring light to a world so suffocated in darkness — none the less, a two-volume extrapolation of our previous and ongoing teachings is the least action we could undertake in this dire hour of need. So that's why we made two records at once. And we wanted to trick people into thinking it was only one because the interweb has sucked all the fun out of releasing records and we wanted people to be fucking surprised by something again. At least we tried."

— Aaron Turner, interview with The Quietus

Promotion for the album consisted of online streams of the tracks "The Lash" and "Predators" leading up to the album's release date in September and October 2014 respectively. The Friday before the album's official release, on November 7, 2014, Old Man Gloom revealed that The Ape of God was actually the name of two different albums, not one as it was presumed to be, and that the promo version of the album given out to music critics was a "fake record" used to trick music pirates into obtaining a false version of the album. From the band's reveal statement: "Guess what, assholes. The Ape Of God is two entirely different albums. If you downloaded some leaked shit, you don't have either. You have some bogus version we gave to press, cuz we knew those jerks would leak it (if you reviewed that fake record positively, thank you. We're just THAT good). We will always trick you." The band later clarified that the "fake version" of The Ape of God was not just a joke album, it was a real album that they put a genuine effort into. They elaborated: "To be fair we, Old Man Gloom spent a lot of time on the music and putting together the 'fake' version of the album. It is still music we believe in and 100% stand behind." Guitarist Nate Newton said that their public statement about calling the promo a "fake record" was slightly misleading. Turner, who came up with the prank, took tracks from both of The Ape of God albums and created a new album with 8 tracks that were edited and mastered slightly differently. For example, the version of "The Lash" that appeared on the "fake" promo version (and also the version that was posted for online streaming) was just under 3 minutes long, while the "real" version of "The Lash" is actually closer to 7 minutes long.

The fact that The Ape Of God was actually two albums was kept very quiet by the band members and record label. When the heavy metal music blog MetalSucks suspected that the album might actually be a double album based on a reader's news tip about an early Amazon.com listing, they reached out to Turner for verification who then blatantly denied the question. Turner said: "Not sure what's going [on] over at Amazon... All I can think of is that there were alternate versions of the art and track sequence/track titles when we were in the developmental stages of the album and that's confusing things. I sent them around to Profound Lore and the band members and the Japanese label... sooo??? Also since there are 3 labels involved in putting out the record (SIGE, Profound Lore, Daymare) maybe that's fucking things up? I'll ask [Profound Lore's] Chris Bruni if he can straighten that out. Thanks for bringing this to our attention!"

The first tour in support of The Ape of God albums will be a 6-date North American West Coast tour in February/March 2015. The tour was preceded by a music video for "The Lash" from The Ape of God (PFL145).

== Reception ==
=== Critical reception of promo version ===
Professional ratings
Promo version
Review scores
Source	Rating
Clash	9/10
Exclaim!	8/10
MetalSucks	4/5

Old Man Gloom released a promotional/alternate version of The Ape of God as a single album for music critics to review, also with the expectation that this version would inevitably be leaked online ahead of the official release date. A few music journalists published an official review of this version before the band revealed that this was not the real version of The Ape of God.

The fake version of The Ape of God albums was very positively received by music critics. Writing for the English publication Clash, Mike Diver gave this version a nine-out-of-ten and stated: "This is a band with an amazing, electrifying song called 'The Volcano' [from 2004's Christmas] to its name, but with this collection Old Man Gloom has surpassed the molten fury of any of their five previous LPs. And now it’s sitting where a previous hit record once was, gnawing on old bones, uncompromised and ugly and unnervingly addictive." For the American metal blog MetalSucks, a writer under the pseudonym "Kip Wingerschmidt" gave the album four-out-of-five horns stated: "Being that The Ape of God incorporates a healthy amount of abstract interlude-esque soundscapes within the songs, clearly this is far from a traditionally structured album, so bring some patience and get ready for ample experimental noise alongside the fantastically pummeling grounded parts of each track." Writing for the Canadian publication Exclaim!, Denise Falzon gave the album an eight-out-of-ten and stated: "Just as devastating, heavy and angry as their previous releases, The Ape of God maintains the band's unique weird sound, which combines huge epic rhythms with experimental noise, ambient elements and dark atmosphere. [...] The theme of the fall of mankind matches the album's sense of despair and apocalyptic sound, making The Ape of God even more of an intriguing listen."

While the promo version's music was well received, many journalists and music critics were upset or angry that the band released a "fake" version of The Ape of God albums. Guitarist Nate Newton said that some journalists felt that Old Man Gloom had "besmirched their profession" and also said that: "People either love [the joke] or they're fucking angry. It was just an idea that came up and we thought, 'Yeah that's funny. Let's do that.' I had no idea people would be so angry." Adrien Begrand of the American heavy metal magazine Decibel was one such journalist, and in a round-up of new album releases for November 2014 said: "I'd been thoroughly digging what I was hearing, but when the band revealed that the promo was merely a fake in order to hoodwink writers and weed out leakers, I didn't appreciate being jerked around and having my precious time wasted by a bunch of smug musicians who think they're being funny. Besides, Profound Lore uses [the online music promo software] Haulix, nearly all metal labels use Haulix, and with that promo platform a band or label can easily track down the person responsible for an album leak. The 'fake promo' idea might have been clever a decade ago, but not in 2014."

=== Critical reception of officially released albums and accolades ===
Professional ratings
Officially released albums
Review scores
Source	Rating
Pitchfork	8.3/10.0 (both albums)
Decibel	7/10 (both albums)

Producer Kurt Ballou listed both The Ape of God albums in his list of favorite albums he worked on in 2014, Rolling Stone ranked both albums at number 4 on its list of The 20 Best Metal Albums of 2014 and Stereogum ranked both albums at number 50 on its list of The 50 Best Metal Albums of 2014.

=== Commercial reception ===
The Ape of God (PFL145) sold approximately 300 units in its first week, however, this was not enough to chart on the Billboard 200.

== Track listings ==
=== The Ape of God (PFL145/SIGE033) ===
1. "Eden's Gates" – 6:31
2. "Promise" – 5:04
3. "Shoulder Meat" – 8:51
4. "Fist of Fury" – 2:26
5. "Simia Dei" – 3:30
6. "The Lash" – 6:55
7. "Never Enter" – 3:01
8. "After You're Dead" – 7:22

=== The Ape of God (PFL145.5/SIGE034) ===
1. "Burden" – 13:25
2. "Predators" – 6:48
3. "A Hideous Nightmare Lies Upon the World" – 12:12
4. "Arrows to Our Hearts" – 14:24

=== The Ape of God (Promo/leak) ===
1. "Fist of Fury" – 2:07
2. "The Lash" – 2:57
3. "Predators" – 6:16
4. "Shoulder Meat" – 9:22
5. "Simia Dei" – 3:29
6. "Never Enter" – 2:54
7. "Promise" – 5:05
8. "Arrows to Our Hearts" – 14:10

== Personnel ==
Personnel adapted from The Ape of God and The Ape of God liner notes. All personnel are credited as contributing to both albums, unless otherwise noted.

=== Old Man Gloom (credited as The Glooms) ===
- Santos Montano
- Nate Newton
- Caleb Scofield
- Aaron Turner

=== Production ===
- Kurt Ballou – recording, mixing
- Aaron Turner – additional recording
- Brad Boatright – mastering

=== Additional musicians ===
- Kurt Ballou – additional guitars on "Eden's Gates"
- Faith Coloccia – vocals on "Eden's Gates"
- Luke Scarola – vocalizations on "After You're Dead," percussion on "Predators"
- Scott Vermeire – vocalizations on "A Hideous Nightmare Lies Upon the World"

=== Artwork ===
- Faith Coloccia – cover design
- Aaron Turner – album art
