= You Hear It First =

US news program on MTV News (2001–2007)

You Hear It First was an on-air MTV News program from 2000 to 2007 that gave the MTV audience a first look at hot emerging artists. The show began as a segment on MTV News 1515 and then spun off into its own half-hour tv series airing on MTV2. Past You Hear It First artists that went on to success include:

- Ye
- Alicia Keys
- Coldplay
- John Legend
- The Killers
- The Pink Spiders
- The Click Five
- Bloc Party
- Cute Is What We Aim For
- Franz Ferdinand
- The Game
- Taproot
- My Chemical Romance
- Fall Out Boy
- Rihanna
- Ne-Yo
- Chris Brown
- Paramore
- The Jonas Brothers
- Robin Thicke
- Sean Paul
- Young Jeezy
- Lily Allen
- Joss Stone
- Silversun Pickups
- Arctic Monkeys
- t.A.T.u.
- Tally Hall
- Nightmare of You
- Kaiser Chiefs
- Cory Gunz
- Tiffany Evans
- Something for Rockets
- Rise Against
- AM Sixty
- Whitestarr
- Brie Larson
- Rupee
- The Blackout Effect
- The Bens (a supergroup consists of Ben Folds, Ben Kweller and Ben Lee)
- Steve Burns
- Acceptance
- Dropping Daylight
- The Vines
- Rosco P
- Hidden Cameras
- Stellastarr
- Kings of Leon
- Fefe Dobson
- Kiley Dean
- Little Brother
- Fiction Plane
- Jin
- Earlimart
- The Exies
- The Beu Sisters
- Interpol
- Rooney
- Idiot Pilot
- Division of Laura Lee
- Desaparecidos
- Bazaar Royale
- Lyrics Born
- The Postal Service
- The Distillers
- Eisley
- The Like
- The Veronicas
- Elefant
- Shout Out Louds
- World Leader Pretend
- Lucy Woodward
- Scissorfight
- Waltham
- Far-Less
- Shiny Toy Guns
- Rock Kills Kid
- Matt Costa
- Thrice
- Dirty Pretty Things
- Lady Sovereign
- Cassie
- The Feeling
- Kittie (first act to ever be profiled on the show)
- Tantric
- Fu Manchu
- Spooks
- The Mooney Suzuki
- Blu Cantrell
- Junior Senior
- Shadows Fall
- Danko Jones
- Howie Day
- The Walkmen
- The Darkness
- Death from Above 1979
- O.A.R.
- Plain White Ts
- Louis XIV
- Paolo Nutini
- John Butler Trio
- Loudermilk
- Sondre Lerche
