= Hello Motherfucker! =

Studio album by Milligram
- Released: March 20, 2001
- Genre: Stoner rock, alternative metal, hardcore punk
- Length: 41:30
- Label: Tortuga Recordings

Hello Motherfucker! is the 2001 re-issue of the CD EP Hello Motherfucker! EP by the band Milligram. It consists of the Black & White Rainbow companion CD added to Hello Motherfucker! EP. It includes instrumentation contribution from Zephan Courtney and Bob Maloney.

== Hello Motherfucker! EP ==
Track listing

No.	Title	Length
1.	"Nipplemountain Clampdown"	1:31
2.	"After the Riot"	2:02
3.	"I Don't Bleed (For You)"	1:57
4.	"Fear and Loathing Everywhere"	2:09
5.	"Names On Walls"	2:41
6.	"Inri"	2:57
7.	"Muscledog Shot"	3:49
Total length:		17:09

== Black & White Rainbow ==
Track listing

No.	Title	Length
1.	"My Own Private Altamont (demo version)"	6:52
2.	"Not Okay"	4:01
3.	"Burntout Technics"	2:22
4.	"She (Misfits Cover)"	1:22
5.	"Fix Me (Black Flag Cover)"	0:50
6.	"Jealous Again (Black Flag Cover)"	1:47
7.	"We Are 138 (Misfits Cover)"	1:43
8.	"Gimme Some Action (Fear Cover)"	5:19
Total length:		24:20
