= Slipped disc (disambiguation) =

Slipped disc is most frequently used as an informal and misleading name for the medical condition known as spinal disc herniation (prolapsus disci intervertebralis).

While the spelling with a "c" is proper in anatomy, it is often spelled with a "k" (disk) in other situations.

It can also refer to the following:

- A composition by the Benny Goodman Sextet or the 1945 album on which it appears
- A song by Lizzy Mercier Descloux
- A song by Luke Vibert
- A 1965 episode of The Donna Reed Show
- An episode of Snoops, also known as "The Stolen Diskette"
- Slipped Disc Records, former record label of rock band Ten Hands
- Slipped Disc Records, a now-defunct yet very important record store in Valley Stream, New York
- A pseudonym for blogger and director Jason Scott Sadofsky, who is referred to as "The Slipped Disk".
- The English music writer Norman Lebrecht's blog
