= Miltown (band) =

US rock band

- Origin: Boston, Massachusetts, United States
- Genres: Post-hardcore, alternative metal
- Years active: 1995–1998
- Labels: Hydra Head Records, Revolution Records
- Past members: Jonah Jenkins; Brian McTernan; Matt Squire; Jay Cannava; Rob Dulaney

Miltown was an American short-lived American rock band from Boston, Massachusetts, United States.

== Biography ==
The band was formed in 1995 by Jonah Jenkins (Only Living Witness, Milligram, Raw Radar War) and was signed by Larry Jacobson to Irving Azoff’s Giant Records, aka Revolution Records.

Miltown recorded several demo tapes on their own with guitarist/producer Brian McTernan and guitarist Matt Squire, releasing a CDEP (Hydra Head Records), two 7” vinyl records and one album for Revolution Records with producer Toby Wright which was never released.

After protracted internal and record label disputes, the group subsequently split. Jenkins went on to provide vocals for Milligram and Raw Radar War.

== Tales of Never Letting Go (unreleased album) ==
Tales of Never Letting Go was recorded in 1998 and was supposed to be the debut album of Miltown but, due to record label conflicts and negative intra-band dynamics, the band split up before the release. On September 5th 2025, the band finally released the album.

== Band members ==
- Jonah Jenkins - vocals
- Brian McTernan - guitar
- Matt Squire - guitar
- Jay Cannava - bass
- Rob Dulaney - drums

== Discography ==
1997

Miltown s/t 7” (Hydra Head Records) limited pressing of 1000, some colored vinyl
No.	Title	Length
1.	"No Matter (Side A)"	2:53
2.	"Tales Of Never Letting Go (Side A)"	2:45
3.	"Predatory Male (Side B)"	5:23

Miltown/Cast Iron Hike split 7” limited pressing of 1000
No.	Title	Length
1.	"Delicate Fiction (Miltown) (Side A)"	3:47
2.	"Jumping Someone Else's Train (Miltown) (Side A)"	2:56
3.	"Shoot, Knife, Strangle, Beat & Crucify (GG Allin cover) (Cast Iron Hike) (Side B)"	5:15

Miltown s/t CDEP (Hydra Head Records)
No.	Title	Length
1.	"No Matter"	2:53
2.	"Pop Culture Consequence"	3:17
3.	"Delicate Fiction"	3:47
4.	"Jumping Someone Else's Train"	2:56
5.	"Predatory Male"	5:23
6.	"Tales of Never Letting Go"	2:45
Total length:		21:04

- They Came From Massachusetts compilation (Big Wheel Recreation)

Contribution with track "No Matter" - 2:53

1998

- Tales of Never Letting Go unreleased (Revolution Records)

1999

- Up The Dosage compilation (Wonderdrug Records)

Contribution with track "Can't Leave Home" - 2:34

2025

Tales of Never Letting Go (Man Alive Records)
No.	Title	Length
1.	"Cleverer"	2:28
2.	"Unraveling"	2:56
3.	"Lost Sleep For Weeks"	3:08
4.	"Tales of Never Letting Go"	2:42
5.	"Even As We Speak"	3:34
6.	"America Through A Windshield"	1:23
7.	"Twin Olympic Pools"	3:47
8.	"Delicate Fiction"	3:37
9.	"Esperanto"	1:59
10.	"8/6/45"	2:48
11.	"End Transmission"	2:43
12.	"Art Thief"	3:01
13.	"No Matter"	2:49
