= Double equal =

Double equal may refer to:

- Double-equal operator, part of JavaScript syntax
- Double Equals, an album by Raw Radio War
