= Old Man Gloom =

American post-metal band

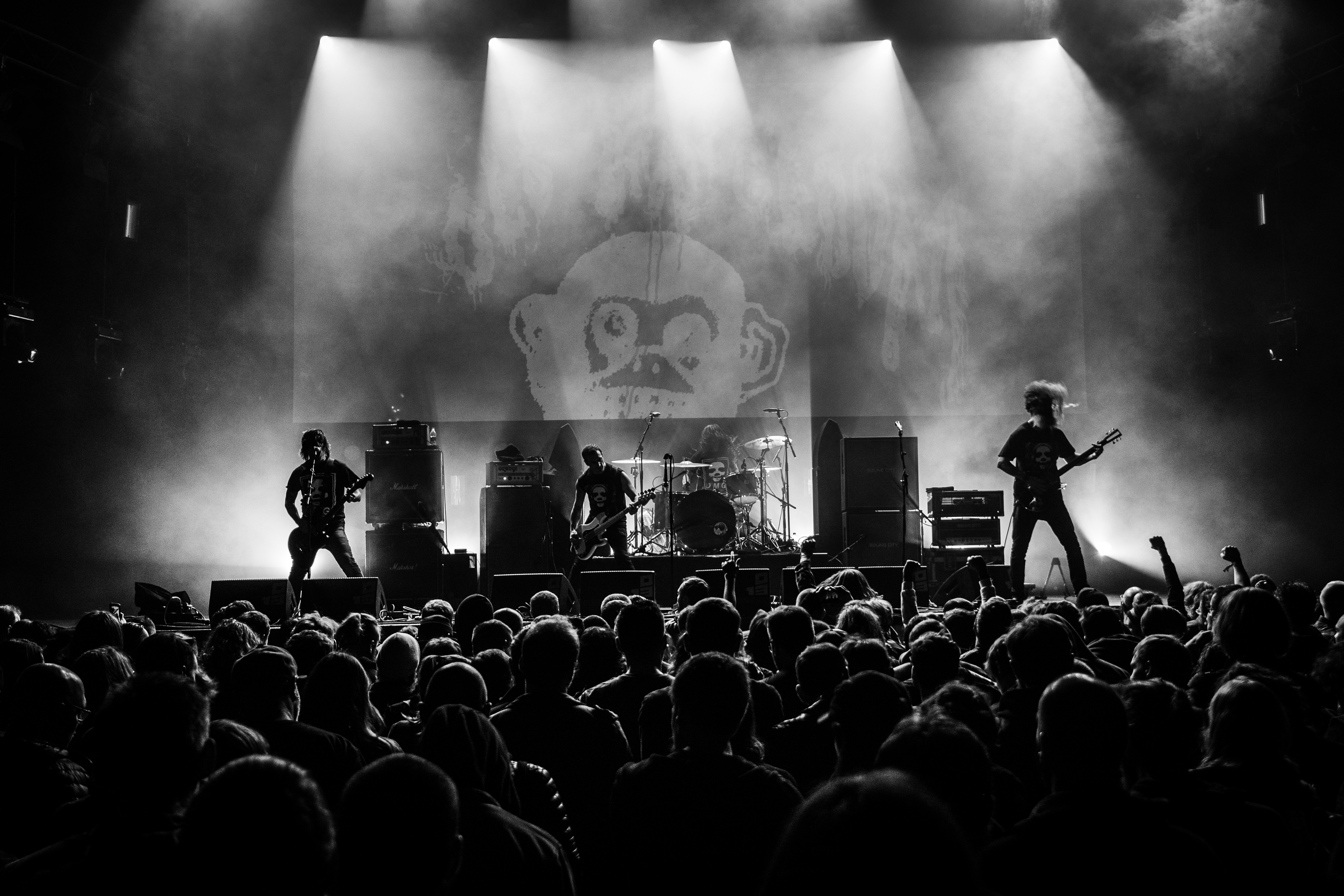
- Old Man Gloom performing at Roadburn Festival 2019

Background information
- Origin: Santa Fe, New Mexico, U.S.
- Genres: Post-metal, sludge metal
- Years active: 1999–present
- Labels: Profound Lore, Tortuga, Hydra Head
- Members: Aaron Turner; Santos Montano; Nate Newton; Stephen Brodsky
- Past members: Caleb Scofield; Luke Scarola

Old Man Gloom is an American post-metal band originally formed in Santa Fe, New Mexico, but now based in Massachusetts. The group, formed by Aaron Turner of Isis and Santos Montano, expanded to become a supergroup in the Boston hardcore and metalcore scene.

== History ==
=== First four albums (1999–2004) ===
In 2001, a year after the release of their first album Meditations in B, the band released two albums simultaneously: Seminar II and Seminar III. For these records, Luke Scarola joined to use electronics. On Seminar II, Stephen Brodsky of Cave In wrote the lyrics for one song, and Jay Randall of Agoraphobic Nosebleed contributed on electronics. On August 24, 2004, Christmas was released.

=== Inactive years (2004–2011) ===
Shortly after the release of Christmas in 2004, Old Man Gloom's activity significantly died down. The members insist that the band did not break up or go on hiatus during this time, but for about eight years none of the members' schedules allowed for any writing or recording time.

Aaron Turner's main band Isis released three more studio albums — Panopticon (2004), In the Absence of Truth (2007) and Wavering Radiant (2009) — before breaking up in 2010. During this time Turner also joined, formed or continued work in other projects, including Greymachine, House of Low Culture, Jodis, Lotus Eaters, Mamiffer, Ringfinger and Twilight. Nate Newton's main band Converge also released three more albums — You Fail Me (2004), No Heroes (2006) and Axe to Fall (2009). He also founded the band Doomriders in 2004 and reunited with one of his earlier bands Jesuit in 2011. Caleb Scofield's main band Cave In released one more studio album Perfect Pitch Black (2005) before going on hiatus in 2006, then reunited in 2009 and released White Silence (2011). Scofield, who had never before been the primary writer for his other bands, formed the band Zozobra — whose name was inspired by Old Man Gloom and its third studio album Seminar III: Zozobra — in 2006 after Cave In went on hiatus. Santos Montano briefly joined Zozobra in its early years and also performed with Stephen Brodsky's (Cave In, Converge) new band New Idea Society for a while.

=== Return, No and The Ape of God (2012–2017) ===
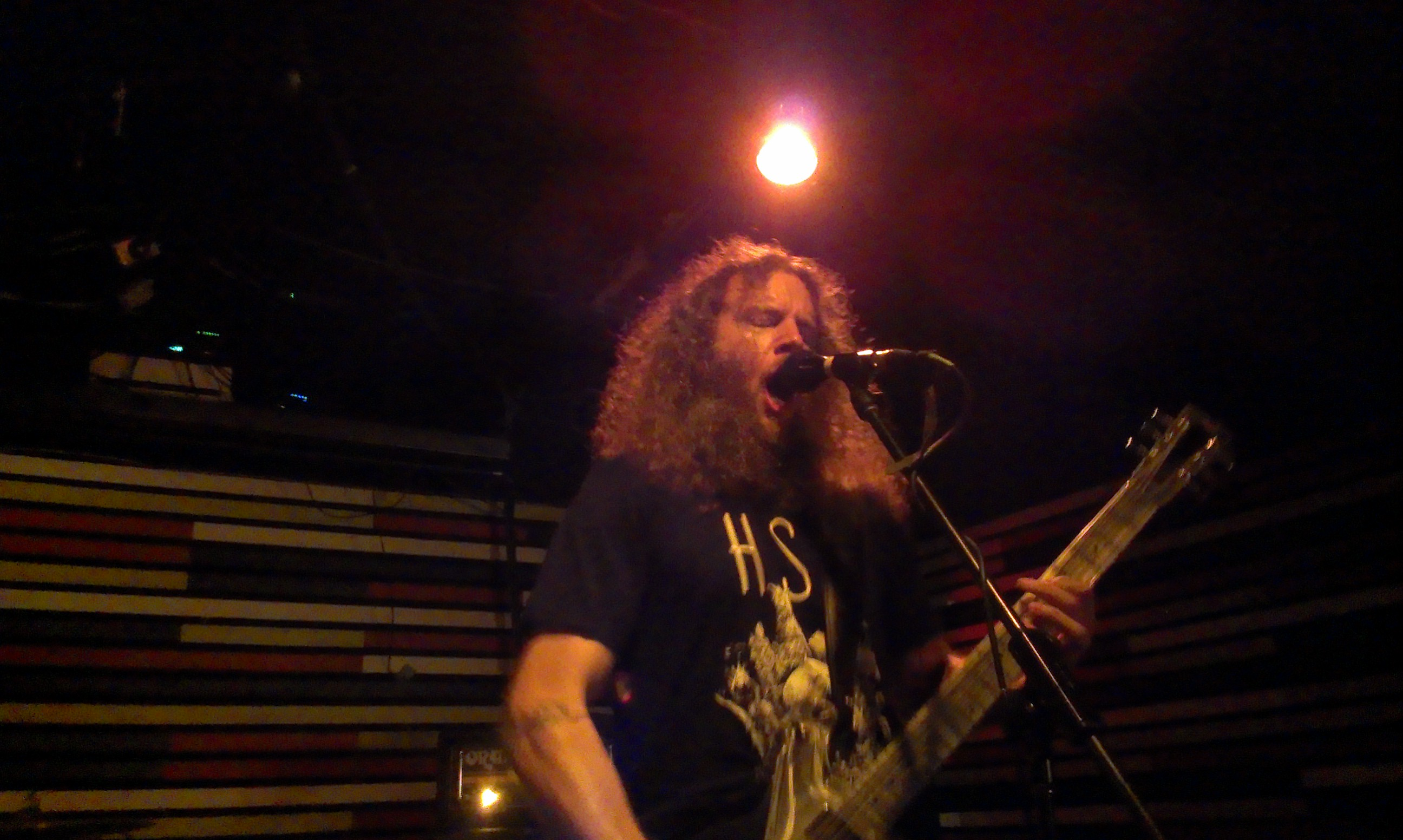
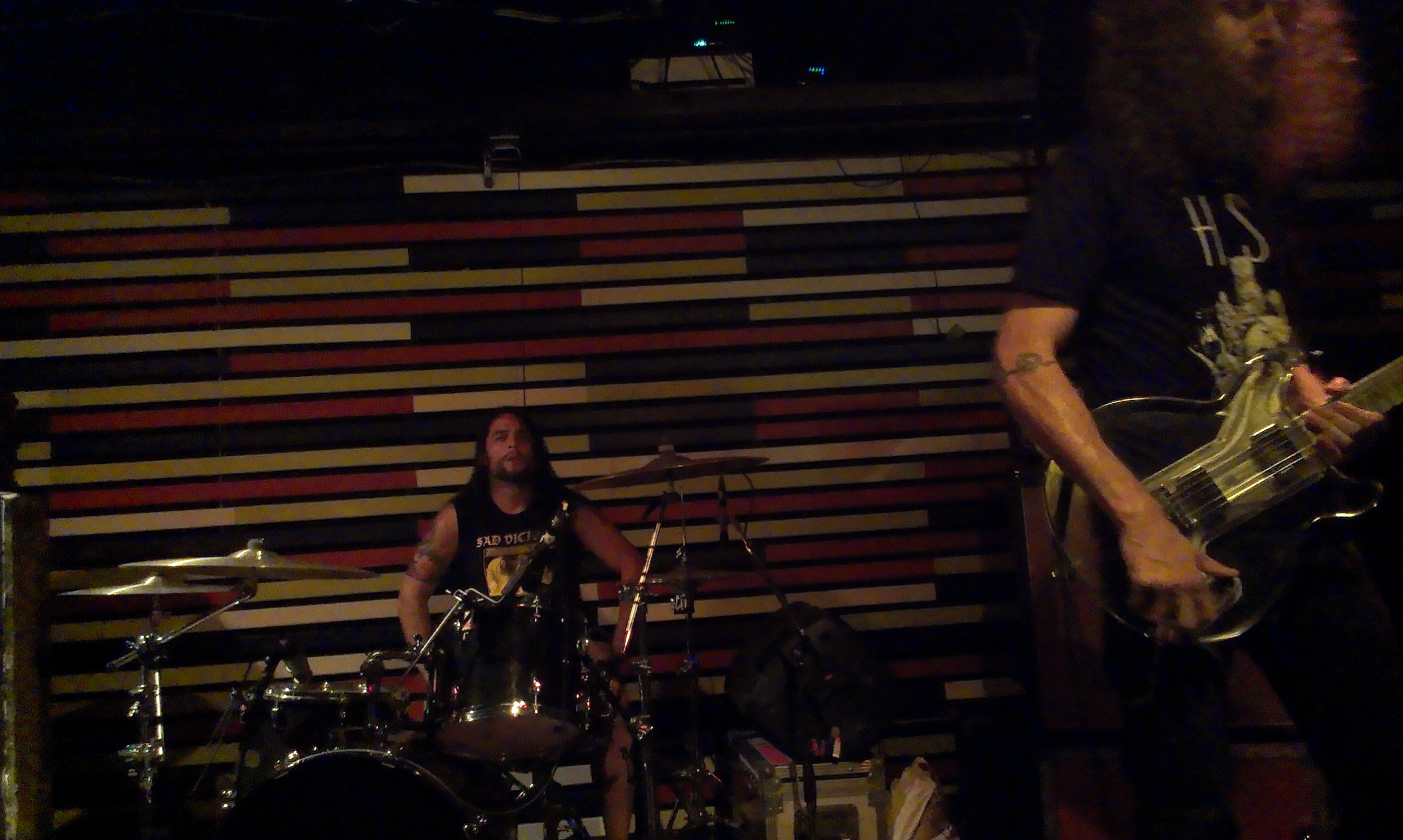
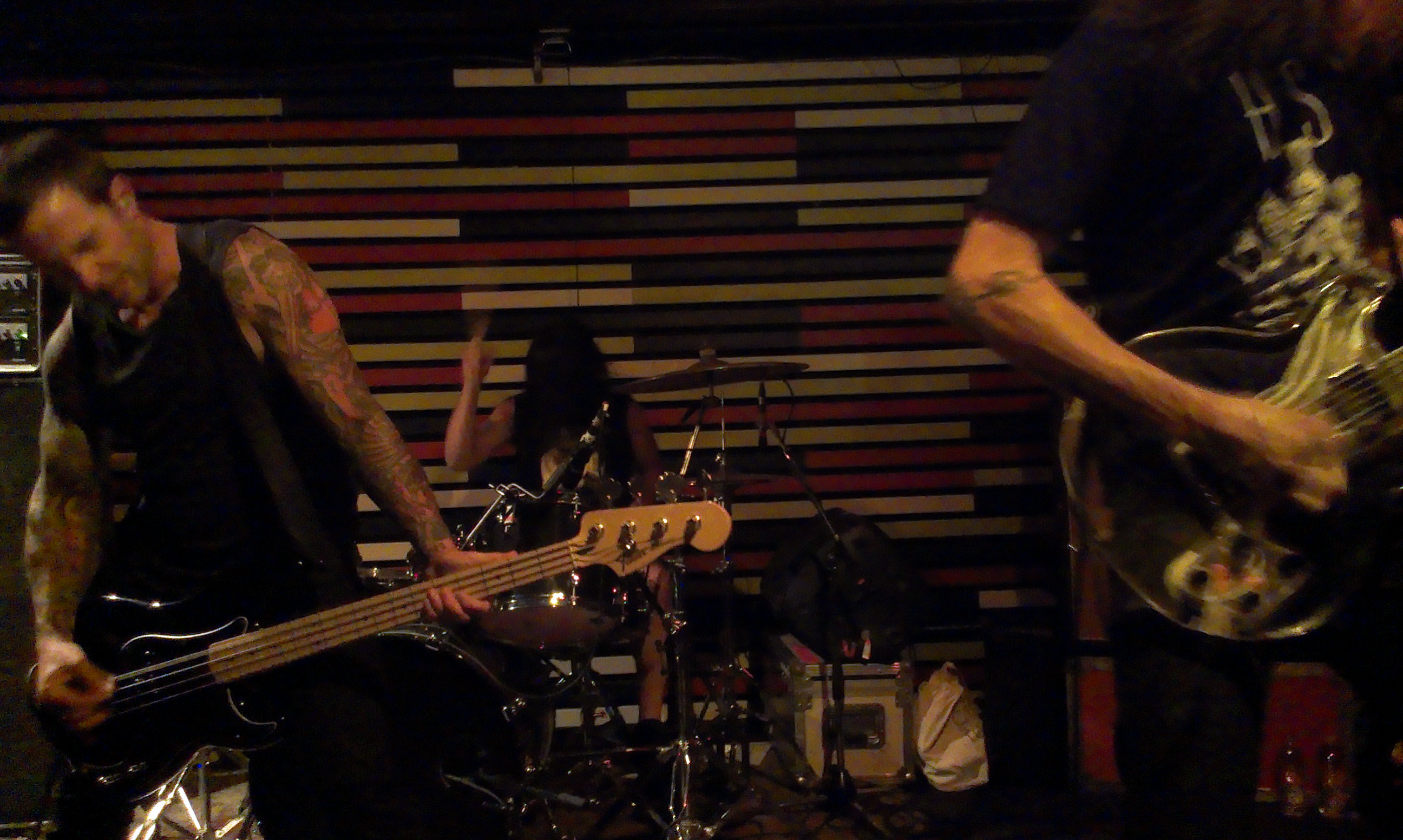
Old Man Gloom performing in 2015

Old Man Gloom abruptly ended an eight-year period of silence by announcing that they would resume touring and release a new album titled No in 2012. The announcement gave little notice that a new album would be coming out and the album itself received minimal promotion. The announcement was made on May 1, 2012, on the band's official Facebook page that No would receive a wide release on June 26 through Hydra Head Records, or fans could pick up a copy of the album at Old Man Gloom's upcoming tour dates, beginning the following day on May 2, 2012. The band and label tried to keep the new album quiet before the announcement, but in 2011, an Easter egg in a magazine advertisement hinted at a new Old Man Gloom being released in 2012, and producer Kurt Ballou tweeted about work on the new album, but later retracted his statement by claiming it was a late April Fools' Day joke.

In late 2014, Old Man Gloom announced the release of a follow-up to No titled The Ape of God for November 11, 2014, through Profound Lore Records and also the release of an unofficial documentary directed by Kenneth Thomas about the band's history leading up to (but not including) The Ape of God titled Here is a Gift for You. The band promoted the album with online streams of "Predators" and "The Lash" prior to the official release date. For several months, The Ape of God was marketed and promoted as a single album, but the weekend before the official release date, Old Man Gloom announced that they were actually releasing two different studio albums both with the name The Ape of God, and that the version of the album sent to the press to review (which also subsequently leaked online) was a "fake" album that featured songs from both albums in a different sequence and edited down to shorter versions. One album, The Ape of God (PFL145) features eight songs in a similar composition to other Old Man Gloom albums, and the other album The Ape of God (PFL145.5) features four songs that are longer and more atmospheric than other Old Man Gloom songs — similar to the band's 2001 albums Seminar II and Seminar III.

A remastered version of Meditations in B was released on April 7, 2015, on Hydra Head Records. The band's first live album (recorded in London at April 3, 2014) was released in early 2016 through Ektro Records.

=== Death of Caleb Scofield (2018) ===
On March 28, 2018, Scofield died at the age of 39 in a car accident in New Hampshire, after his car hit a concrete barrier at a high speed. Montano, Turner and Newton agreed to keep performing as Old Man Gloom to honor Scofield following his death. In a Facebook statement, Montano said:

In a quiet moment, in a very loud room filled with more people than I could count, Aaron and I were sitting across from one another, totally drained, zombiefied, just looking at each other. He leaned towards me, and I leaned towards him. He quietly said 'Santos, do you still want to do Old Man Gloom?' My stomach dropped, and I responded 'we have to now. We don't have a choice.' We spoke to Nate and he agreed. I don't know what it means, or how it will manifest itself, but we will continue and do our best to honor Caleb, and that means we must exist. I share this very private moment because I truly feel after this week you are all a part of our story so much more than I ever realized. Thank you for showing us that. We love you all.

The band enlisted long-time friend and Scofield's Cave In bandmate Stephen Brodsky to perform with them at the late bass player's tribute show on June 13, 2018, in Boston, MA.

Prior to Scofield's death, Old Man Gloom planned to record a new album in 2018. Unbeknownst to Scofield and Newton, Montano and Turner also had secret plans to record a second new album as a duo (a "sequel" to Meditations in B) and release it on the same day. About the secret plans, Mantano said: "Yes, we were going to troll ourselves this time. I mean, half of ourselves. We figured it was the only place left to go, to fully shit on our own bandmates AND the general public with more gloom." In December 2018, Old Man Gloom began working on a new studio album with Brodsky, who was also reported as becoming an official member of the band.

== Members ==
=== Current members ===
- Aaron Turner (Isis, Mamiffer, Sumac) – guitars, vocals (1999–present), bass (1999, 2018), electronics (1999–2001, 2004–present)
- Santos Montano – drums, backing vocals (1999–present)
- Nate Newton (Converge, Doomriders, Cave In) – guitars, vocals (2000–present)
- Stephen Brodsky (Cave In, Mutoid Man) – bass, vocals (2018–present)

=== Former members ===
- Caleb Scofield (Cave In, Zozobra) – bass, vocals (2000–2018; died 2018)
- Luke Scarola – electronics (2001–2004)

== Discography ==
=== Studio albums ===
- Meditations in B (2000, Tortuga)
- Seminar II: The Holy Rites of Primitivism Regressionism (2001, Tortuga)
- Seminar III: Zozobra (2001, Tortuga)
- Christmas (2004, Tortuga)
- No (2012, Hydra Head)
- The Ape of God I (2014, Profound Lore)
- The Ape of God II (2014, Profound Lore)
- Seminar VIII: Light of Meaning (2020, Profound Lore)
- Seminar IX: Darkness of Being (2020, Profound Lore)

=== Extended plays ===
- Christmas Eve I and II + 6 (2003, Tortuga)
- Willing Vessel / Storms in our Eyes (2020, Sige)

=== Live albums ===
- Mickey Rookey Live at London (2016, Ektro)
- Zozoburn: Live at Fiesta Roadburn with Zozobra (2020, Sige)

=== Music videos ===
- "The Lash" (2015)
