= Balls Deep (album) =

Studio album by Scissorfight
- Released: 1998
- Studio: Prophet Sound, New Alliance & Wellspring Studios
- Length: 41:01
- Label: Wonderdrug Records
- Producer: "Lord" Ken Cmar & Scissorfight

Scissorfight chronology
Guaranteed Kill (1996)	Balls Deep (1998)	New Hampshire (1999)

Balls Deep is the second album from the Portsmouth, New Hampshire rock band Scissorfight. The album was also the band's second, and final release under Wonderdrug Records. At which time the group switched over to Tortuga Recordings for their third album New Hampshire. The song "Human Head" was released as a single on 7-inch vinyl.

== Track listing ==
1. "Drunken Hangman" – 2:20
2. "Human Head" – 2:30
3. "The Gibbetted Captain Kidd" – 2:56
4. "Scarecrow Season" – 1:50
5. "Curse of the Returned Astronaut" – 4:17
6. "Quantrill’s Raiders" – 2:30
7. "Infuriator" – 3:38
8. "Lunatic Yankee Spectre" – 2:50
9. "Stove by a Whale" – 4:01
10. "Balls Deep" – 1:51
11. "Kancamagus Mangler" – 2:28
12. "Cramp" – 2:16
13. "Scream of the Wendigo" – 7:31

== Personnel ==
- Ironlung – vocals
- Jay Fortin – guitar
- Kevin J. Strongbow – drums
- Paul Jarvis – bass guitar
