= Nate Newton (musician) =

American musician (born 1975)

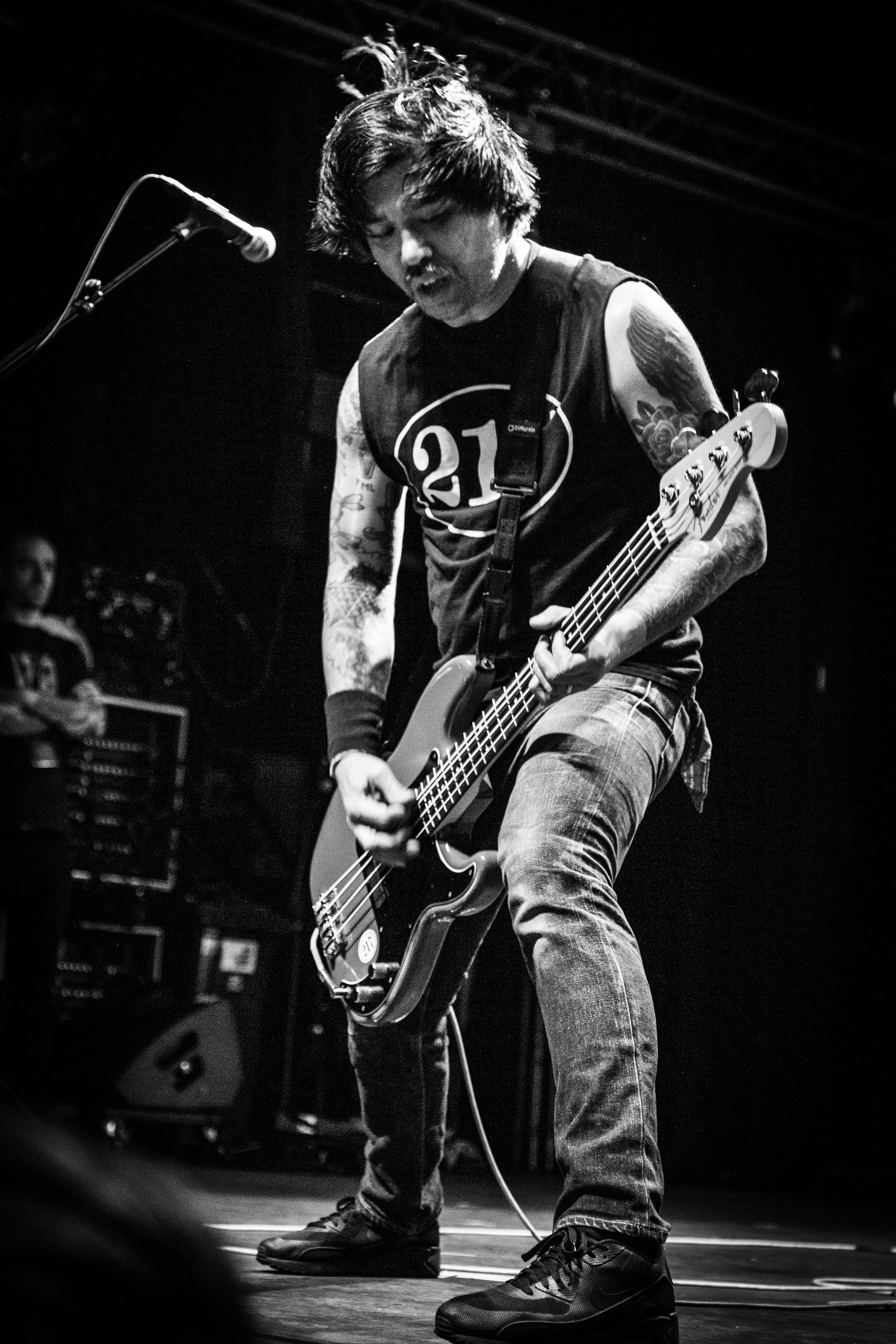
- Newton performing with Converge in 2018

Background information
- Also known as: Nathaniel Harlan Newton
- Born: October 9, 1975 (age 51)
- Genres: Metalcore; hardcore punk; mathcore; post-hardcore; sludge metal; heavy metal
- Occupation: Musician
- Instruments: Bass; guitar; vocals
- Years active: 1994–present
- Member of: Converge; Cave In; Old Man Gloom; Doomriders
- Formerly of: Jesuit; Cavalera Conspiracy

Nathaniel Harlan Newton (born October 9, 1975) is an American musician. He is the bassist and backing vocalist of the hardcore punk band Converge, the rock band Cave In and also the guitarist and singer in Old Man Gloom and Doomriders. Newton has also been a guitarist and vocalist in Jesuit and bassist in Cavalera Conspiracy.

== Career ==
In 1998, Converge bassist Stephen Brodsky left the band and was replaced by Newton, who initially joined the band as a part-time member while he was still active in another band, Jesuit. Jesuit later disbanded in 1999, allowing Newton to make Converge his main focus.

In late 2013, Newton was recruited by Cavalera Conspiracy to contribute on bass guitar for their third studio album. In 2018, Newton joined Cave In after the death of bassist/vocalist Caleb Scofield. Newton was a vegetarian for several years, before he returned to eating seafood. In numerous interviews, he has cited the 1975 classic Jaws as his favorite film, and he has explained that his involvement in skateboarding introduced him to the punk rock scene.

== Equipment ==
Bass guitars

- '78 Fender Precision Bass Special
- '06 Fender Precision Bass Standard
- First Act Custom Shop Delgada
- Epiphone Precision Bass
- Fender American Professional Precision Bass (Antique Olive Color) w/ Riffblasters pickups by Lace Sensor
- Music Man Stingray

Amplifiers

- Orange Thunderverb 200
- Orange AD200B
- Ampeg 8x10 Anniversary SVT Cabinet
- Mesa Boogie 2x15 Cabinet

== Discography ==
=== Jesuit ===
- Jesuit (1996)
- Jesuit (1999)
- Discography (2011)

=== Converge ===
- Jane Doe (2001)
- You Fail Me (2004)
- No Heroes (2006)
- Axe to Fall (2009)
- All We Love We Leave Behind (2012)
- The Dusk in Us (2017)
- Bloodmoon: I (2021) (with Chelsea Wolfe)
- Love Is Not Enough (2026)
- Hum of Hurt (2026)

=== Old Man Gloom ===
- Seminar II: The Holy Rites of Primitivism Regressionism (2001)
- Seminar III: Zozobra (2001)
- Christmas (2004)
- No (2012)
- The Ape of God (2014)
- Seminar IX: Darkness of Being (2020)
- Seminar VIII: Light of Meaning (2020)

=== Doomriders ===
- Black Thunder (2005)
- Darkness Come Alive (2009)
- Grand Blood (2013)

=== Cave In ===
- Heavy Pendulum (2022)

=== Split Cranium ===
- I'm The Devil And I'm OK (2018)

=== Cavalera Conspiracy ===
- Pandemonium (2014)

=== Guest appearances ===
Year	Artist	Album
2003	Some Kind of Hate	Some Kind of Hate (EP)
2005	Mi Amore	Lamb
2006	The Hope Conspiracy	Death Knows Your Name
2007	The Red Chord	Prey for Eyes
2007	Coliseum	No Salvation
2007	The Ocean	Precambrian
2008	Clouds	We Are Above You
2008	Young Widows	Old Wounds
2009	Rise and Fall	Our Circle Is Vicious
2012	Turbonegro	Sexual Harassment
2017	Full of Hell	Trumpeting Ecstasy
2020	Kvelertak	Splid
