= Prone Mortal Form/Innocents =

Compilation album by Only Living Witness
- Released: June 27, 2006
- Recorded: February 1993, August 14 to August 26, 1995
- Studio: Fort Apache Studios, Cambridge, Massachusetts
- Genre: Heavy metal
- Label: Century Media (CD version); Reflections (Vinyl version)
- Producer: Tim O'Heir; Eric Stevenson

Only Living Witness chronology
Innocents (1996)	Prone Mortal Form/Innocents (2006)

Prone Mortal Form/Innocents is a double CD/vinyl re-issue of Only Living Witness's two albums.

== CD version ==
=== Disc 1 – Prone Mortal Form ===
No.	Title	Length
1.	"Prone Mortal Form"	5:17
2.	"Root"	3:17
3.	"Voice of Disrepair"	4:54
4.	"Silo"	1:18
5.	"VTA (Veracity, Tenacity And Aspirin)"	2:01
6.	"Slug"	4:03
7.	"Twitching Tongues"	3:39
8.	"Nineveh"	4:35
9.	"Darkly"	1:39
10.	"December"	4:45
Total length:		35:28

2006 bonus tracks

No.	Title	Length
11.	"Prone Mortal Form (Demo)"	5:12
12.	"Twitching Tongues (Demo)"	3:03
13.	"Window 4:45 (Demo)"	4:45
14.	"Nineveh (Demo)"	5:29
15.	"Slug (Demo)"	4:30
16.	"Prone Moral Form (CD-ROM Track)"
Total length:		58:37

- Tracks 11–15 taken from the 1992's Prone Mortal Form (demo).

=== Disc 2 – Innocents ===
No.	Title	Length
1.	"No Eden"	3:59
2.	"Knew Her Gone"	3:41
3.	"Deed's Pride"	3:16
4.	"Placid Hill"	1:47
5.	"Some Will Never Know"	4:16
6.	"Strata"	3:32
7.	"Freaklaw"	2:59
8.	"Hank Crane"	5:04
9.	"Downpour"	4:12
10.	"Total Particle Reversal"	6:26
Total length:		39:12

2006 bonus tracks

No.	Title	Length
11.	"War of the Gargantuas (Instrumental - Outtake)"	2:28
12.	"Freaklaw (Single)"	2:48
13.	"Some Will Never Know (Single)"	4:04
14.	"Deed's Pride (Demo)"	3:12
15.	"Knew Her Gone (Demo)"	3:36
16.	"Total Particle Reversal (Demo)"	6:02
17.	"Some Will Never Know (CD-ROM Track)"
Total length:		61:22

- Track 11 recorded during the "Innocents" sessions. Tracks 12 & 13 taken from the Freaklaw 7-inch EP. Tracks 14, 15, 16 taken from the "Innocents" pre-production demo.

== Vinyl version ==
Disc 1 – Prone Mortal Form

Side A
No.	Title	Length
1.	"Prone Mortal Form"	5:17
2.	"Root"	3:17
3.	"Voice Of Disrepair"	4:54
4.	"Silo"	1:18
5.	"VTA (Veracity, Tenacity And Aspirin)"	2:01

Side B
No.	Title	Length
1.	"Slug"	4:03
2.	"Twitching Tongues"	3:39
3.	"Nineveh"	4:35
4.	"Darkly"	1:39
5.	"December"	4:45
Total length:		35:28

Disc 2 – Innocents

Side A
No.	Title	Length
1.	"No Eden"	3:59
2.	"Knew Her Gone"	3:41
3.	"Deed's Pride"	3:16
4.	"Placid Hill"	1:47
5.	"Some Will Never Know"	4:16

Side B
No.	Title	Length
1.	"Strata"	3:32
2.	"Freaklaw"	2:59
3.	"Hank Crane"	5:04
4.	"Downpour"	4:12
5.	"Total Particle Reversal"	6:26
Total length:		39:12
