= Meditations in B =

Meditations In B

Studio album by Old Man Gloom
- Released: August 22, 2000
- Length: 29:23
- Label: Tortuga Recordings
- Producer: Tim Stroh, Old Man Gloom

Old Man Gloom chronology
| Meditations In B (2000) | Seminar II: The Holy Rites of Primitivism Regressionism (2001) |

Professional ratings
Review scores
| Source | Rating |
|---|---|
| AllMusic | 3/5 stars |
| Sputnikmusic | 3.5/5 |

Meditations in B is the debut full-length album by Old Man Gloom. A remastered version of the album was released on April 7, 2015, through Hydra Head Records.

== Production ==
The album was written and recorded in New Mexico in under a week.

== Critical reception ==
Exclaim! wrote: "OMG focuses more on quick, jagged, sonic barbs and drawn out ambient experimentation, rather than the brooding, atmospheric destruction Isis is known for."

== Track listing ==
All tracks written by Perez and Turner.

1. "Afraid Of" – 1:16
2. "Flood I" – 0:50
3. "Simian Alien Technology: Message Received" – 3:27
4. "Sonic Wave of Bees" – 1:22
5. "Sonar Enlightenment Program" – 5:43
6. "Rotten Primate" – 1:47
7. "The Exploder Whale" – 1:02
8. "Poisoner" – 0:42
9. "An Evening at the Gentleman's Club for Apes" – 0:55
10. "Vipers" – 0:50
11. "Test Result: Alien Ape Distress Signal" – 1:55
12. "Flood II" – 1:02
13. "Resolving the De-Evolution Conflict" – 1:31
14. "Scraps Theatre Presents: Confusion in Five Movements" – 7:01

== Credits ==
Old Man Gloom

- Aaron Turner – vocals, guitars, bass, samples, noise; recording and mixing (tracks 3, 5, 7, 9, 11, 13, 14), layout design, construction and layout concept
- Santos "Hanno" Montano – drumming, backing vocals; data backup, viral marketing

Additional musician

- Juan Perez – backing vocals (tracks 2, 8, 12)

Production

- Tim Stroh – producer, engineering and mixing (tracks 1, 2, 4, 6, 8, 10, 12)
- Old Man Gloom – producer (tracks 1, 2, 4, 6, 8, 10, 12), editing and mastering
- Eric Gallegos – engineering and mixing assistant (tracks 1, 2, 4, 6, 8, 10, 12)
- Dave Merullo – editing and mastering
- Juan Perez – consultation, direction and layout concept
- Justin Rudy Fiset – photography
- Mister Gilligan – photography
