= Twisted Crystal =

Studio album by Guerilla Toss
- Released: September 14, 2018
- Studios: Outlier Inn, Woodridge, New York
- Genres: Neo-psychedelia; new wave; art rock; progressive pop; space rock
- Length: 29:30
- Label: DFA
- Producer: Josh Druckman

Guerilla Toss chronology
GT Ultra (2017)	Twisted Crystal (2018)	What Would The Odd Do? (2019)

Professional ratings
Aggregate scores
Source	Rating
Metacritic	79/100
Review scores
Source	Rating
AllMusic	4/5 stars
Exclaim!	8/10
Pitchfork	7.3/10

Twisted Crystal is the sixth studio album by American indie rock band Guerilla Toss. It was released on September 14, 2018, by DFA Records.

== Critical reception ==
Twisted Crystal was met with "generally favorable" reviews from critics. At Metacritic, which assigns a weighted average rating out of 100 to reviews from mainstream publications, this release received an average score of 79, based on 8 reviews. Aggregator Album of the Year gave the release a 76 out of 100 based on a critical consensus of 9 reviews.

== Track listing ==
Twisted Crystal track listing
No.	Title	Length
1.	"Magic Is Easy"	3:11
2.	"Jesus Rabbit"	2:09
3.	"Meteorological"	3:21
4.	"Hacking Machine"	3:47
5.	"Retreat"	2:34
6.	"Come Up With Me"	3:19
7.	"Walls of the Universe"	4:04
8.	"Jackie's Daughter"	3:23
9.	"Green Apple"	3:42

== Personnel ==
Musicians

- Kassie Carlson – vocals, violin
- Stephen Cooper – bass
- Sam Lisabeth – keyboard
- Peter Negroponte – drums
- Arian Shafiee – guitar
- Nick Forté – vocals

Production

- Josh Druckman – producer, mixing, engineer
- Joe Lambert – mastering
