= Seminar II: The Holy Rites of Primitivism Regressionism =

Studio album by Old Man Gloom
- Released: March 20, 2001
- Genre: Sludge metal; doom metal; post-metal
- Length: 58:33
- Label: Tortuga Recordings
- Producer: Kurt Ballou

Old Man Gloom chronology
Meditations in B (1999)	Seminar II: The Holy Rites of Primitivism Regressionism (2001)	Seminar III: Zozobra (2001)

Professional ratings
Review scores
Source	Rating
AllMusic	4/5 stars

Seminar II: The Holy Rites of Primitivism Regressionism is the second full-length album by Old Man Gloom, released in 2001. It was released simultaneously with Seminar III.

== Critical reception ==
AllMusic wrote that the album "plays out as a sort of roller coaster ride, with quiet ambient drones giving way to full-on metalcore assaults (and vice versa) throughout its 17 tracks."

== Track listing ==
All songs written by Santos Montano, Nate Newton, Cale Scofield, and Aaron Bradford Turner, except lyrics to "Mandied (Self: Reborn)" by Stephen Brodsky.

1. "Brain Returns To Initial State" – 0:53
2. "Bells Dark Above Our Heads" – 4:11
3. "Branch Breaker" – 0:51
4. "Radio Crackles Spill Down My Face" – 1:33
5. "Hot Salvation" – 3:10
6. "Breath Drops Out In Ice And Glass" – 5:57
7. "Rape Athena" – 1:46
8. "Roar Of The Forest Rose To Thunder" – 2:24
9. "Clenched Tight In The Fist Of God" – 2:16
10. "Only Dogs Hear (Here)" – 0:51
11. "Jaws Of The Lion" – 2:42
12. "Smoke Out Loud" – 6:26
13. "Deserts In Your Eyes" – 3:09
14. "Meditations In B Part V & VI" – 5:48
15. "Cinders Of The Simian Psyche" – 2:43
16. "Three Ring Ocean Sideshow" – 5:43
17. "Mandied (Self: Reborn)" – 8:10
- Track 17 is a hidden track

== Credits ==
Old Man Gloom

- Aaron Turner – guitar, sounds, vocals; recording (tracks 1, 4, 6, 8, 10, 12, 14, 16), artwork, photography
- Nate Newton – guitar, backing vocals
- Caleb Scofield – bass guitar, backing vocals
- Santos Montano – drums; vocals (track 13); photography
- Luke Scarola – electronics; recording (tracks 1, 4, 6, 8, 10, 14, 16), photography

Production

- Kurt Ballou – producer; recording (tracks 2, 3, 5, 7, 9, 11, 13, 15, 17)
- Jay Randall – electronics; recording (track 12)
- Jeff Caxide – occasional recording assistance
- Dave Merullo – mastering
- Jason Hellmann – artwork
