= GT Ultra =

Studio album by Guerilla Toss
- Released: May 19, 2017
- Studio: The Submarine Studio, New York
- Genre: Dance-punk; neo-psychedelia; new wave; art pop; progressive pop; space rock
- Length: 28:57
- Label: DFA
- Producer: Peter Blackbridge, Dan Death

Guerilla Toss chronology
Eraser Stargazer (2016)	GT Ultra (2017)	Twisted Crystal (2018)

GT Ultra is the fifth studio album by American indie rock band Guerilla Toss. It was released on May 19, 2017, by DFA Records.

== Critical reception ==
Professional ratings
Review scores
Source	Rating
Pitchfork	7.5/10
Tiny Mix Tapes	3/5 stars

Ultra GT was met with favorable reviews from critics. Reviewing the album for Pitchfork, Jesse Jarnow wrote that the album is "anything but monochromatic, but its energy also feels occasionally constrained by its own parameters, with Carlson’s lyrics and the band's arrangements pogoing at the edge of total freedom, and perhaps total chaos." In the Review for Tiny Mix Tapes, Leah B. Levinson called it "an album that is full of musical ingenuity and aural pleasures" but also felt that it was "lacking in long-term affect or cultural demarcators."

== Track listing ==
GT Ultra track listing
No.	Title	Length
1.	"Betty Dreams of Green Men"	3:29
2.	"Can I Get the Real Stuff"	2:57
3.	"Crystal Run"	2:57
4.	"TV Do Tell"	1:35
5.	"The String Game"	3:15
6.	"Skull Pop"	5:01
7.	"Dog in the Mirror"	5:03
8.	"Dose Rate"	4:40

== Personnel ==
Credits transcribed from AllMusic.

Musicians

- Kassie Carlson – vocals, writing
- William Dantzler – vocals
- Ari Diacomis – congas
- Ben Katzman - bass
- Sam Lisabeth – keyboard
- Peter Negroponte – drums
- Arian Shafiee – guitar

Production

- Peter Blackbridge - producer
- Dan Death – producer, mixing, tracking
- Joe Lambert – mastering

Design

- Artwork - Mark McCloud
- Layout - Keith Rankin
