= No (Old Man Gloom album) =

Studio album by Old Man Gloom
- Released: June 26, 2012
- Recorded: 2011 at God City Studio and HOLC
- Genre: Sludge metal, post-metal
- Length: 56:28
- Label: Hydra Head (HH666-235)
- Producer: Kurt Ballou

Old Man Gloom chronology
Christmas (2004)	No (2012)	The Ape of God and The Ape of God (2014)

No is the fifth studio album by American rock band Old Man Gloom. Though the album saw a limited release during the group's May 2012 tours, it saw official wide release on June 26, 2012, through Hydra Head Records. No is Old Man Gloom's first studio release since 2004's Christmas.

On May 29, 2012, the song "Common Species" was posted online for previewing.

Professional ratings
Review scores
Source	Rating
Pitchfork Media	(7.2/10)
PopMatters	(8/10)
Spin	7/10

== Track listing ==
1. "Grand Inversion" – 2:25
2. "Common Species" – 7:59
3. "Regain / Rejoin" – 2:31
4. "To Carry the Flame" – 4:31
5. "The Forking Path" – 4:13
6. "Shadowed Hand" – 8:12
7. "Rats" – 8:09
8. "Crescent" – 4:25
9. "Shuddering Earth" – 14:03

== Personnel ==
Old Man Gloom

- Nate Newton
- Aaron Turner
- Santos Montano
- Caleb Scofield

Guest musicians

- Kevin Baker (The Hope Conspiracy, All Pigs Must Die)
- Kurt Ballou (Converge)
- Mike McKenzie (The Red Chord)

Production and recording

- Kurt Ballou – recording, mixing
- James Plotkin – mastering

Layout and design

- Abct – artwork
- Faith Coloccia – typography, art assistance

== Charts ==
Chart (2012)	Peak position
US Heatseekers Albums (Billboard)	34
