= Seminar III: Zozobra =

Studio album by Old Man Gloom
- Released: 2001
- Genre: Sludge metal Doom metal Post-metal
- Length: 27:10
- Label: Tortuga Recordings

Old Man Gloom chronology
Seminar II: The Holy Rites of Primitivism Regressionism (2001)	Seminar III: Zozobra (2001)	Christmas Eve I and II + 6 (2003)

Professional ratings
Review scores
Source	Rating
Allmusic	4.5/5 stars

Seminar III: Zozobra is the third studio album by Old Man Gloom, released in 2001 by Hydra Head Records imprint Tortuga Recordings.

== Track listing ==
All tracks are written by Santos Montano, Nate Newton, Cale Scofield, and Aaron Bradford Turner

No.	Title	Length
1.	"Zozobra"	27:10

== Personnel ==
Old Man Gloom

- Aaron Turner – guitar, sounds, vocals; additional recording, artwork, photography
- Nate Newton – guitar, backing vocals
- Caleb Scofield – bass guitar, backing vocals
- Santos Montano – drums; photography
- Luke Scarola – effects and electronics; additional recording, photography

Production

- Kurt Ballou – producer, recording
- Jeff Caxide – occasional recording assistance
- Dave Merullo – mastering
- Jason Hellmann – artwork
