= Mantrapping for Sport and Profit =

Studio album by Scissorfight
- Released: 2001
- Recorded: Fort Apache and New Alliance Studios
- Genre: Southern Metal; Stoner Metal
- Length: 41:34
- Label: Tortuga Recordings
- Producer: Andrew Schneider, Craig Ross & Scissorfight

Scissorfight chronology
Piscataqua EP (2000)	Mantrapping for Sport and Profit (2001)	Potential New Agent for Unconventional Warfare EP (2002)

Mantrapping for Sport and Profit is the fourth album from the New Hampshire group Scissorfight.

The album was rated 3 out of 5 stars by AllMusic.

== Track listing ==
1. "Acid for Blood" - 3:22
2. "New Hampshire's All Right If You Like Fighting - 3:00
3. "Rats U.S.A." - 2:38
4. "Deliver The Yankee Coffin" - 2:31
5. "The Most Dangerous Animal Is Me" - 3:44
6. "Hazard to Navigation" - 5:55
7. "Hammerdown" - 3:01
8. "Blizzards, Buzzards, Bastards" - 3:55
9. "Mantrap" - 2:35
10. "Death In The Wilderness" - 2:55
11. "Candy Clark" - 2:55
12. "Go Cave!" - 3:15
13. "Cram It Clown" - 1:41

== Personnel ==
- Ironlung – vocals
- Geezum H. Crow (Jay Fortin) – guitar
- Kevin J. Strongbow – drums
- Paul Jarvis – bass guitar
