= 5ive (American band) =

American instrumental band

- Origin: Boston, Massachusetts, United States
- Genres: Space rock, experimental rock, post-metal, sludge metal
- Years active: 2000–present
- Labels: Tortuga Recordings
- Members: Ben Carr; Charlie Harrold
- Past members: Jeff Caxide; Jonah Jenkins
- Website: Official Myspace

5ive (for one release known as 5ive's Continuum Research Project) are an American instrumental band from Boston, Massachusetts formed in 2000 consisting of the duo of Ben Carr and Charlie Harrold.

== History ==
In 2001, 5ive released their self-titled first studio album on Tortuga Recordings, which included Jeff Caxide (Isis) on bass. Later in the same year, they released their second studio album, The Telestic Disfracture, which included vocals on the first two tracks by Jonah Jenkins (Milligram).

In 2003, the band changed their name to '5ive's Continuum Research Project' and released, The Hemophiliac Dream (EP) which again included Jeff Caxide on bass. It featured only two tracks, the almost 23-minute-long "The Hemophiliac Dream, Pt. 1" and a remix by James Plotkin. In 2004, they released a Split with Kid606.

In 2006, they changed their name back to 5ive and released Versus, which originally was a tour-only EP from 2004, which included a two-stage remix of the track "Soma", the latter being remixed by Justin Broadrick (Godflesh, Jesu). In 2008, they released their third studio album, Hesperus, described by The Guardian as "fast, heavy and pleasingly unfussy, but with enough spry, sub-surface shifts and stop-start surprises to be highly satisfying".

5ive mixes space rock, post-metal, drone, experimental and sludge elements. Ben Carr in an interview with Carl Shultz: "5ive shapes tones and experiments with analog waveforms. Our sound has always been described as an organic sound, it has natural truth to it and though it is not always a happy or uplifting message, you cannot deny it".

== Discography ==
- 5ive (2001)
- The Telestic Disfracture (2001)
- The Hemophiliac Dream EP (2003)
- Versus EP (2004)
- Hesperus (2008)

Side bands:

- INTRCPTR (2017) – 2-piece instrumental band with Ben Carr (guitar), Larry Herweg (drums) [drummer in Pelican]
