= Scissorfight =

American Stoner Metal band

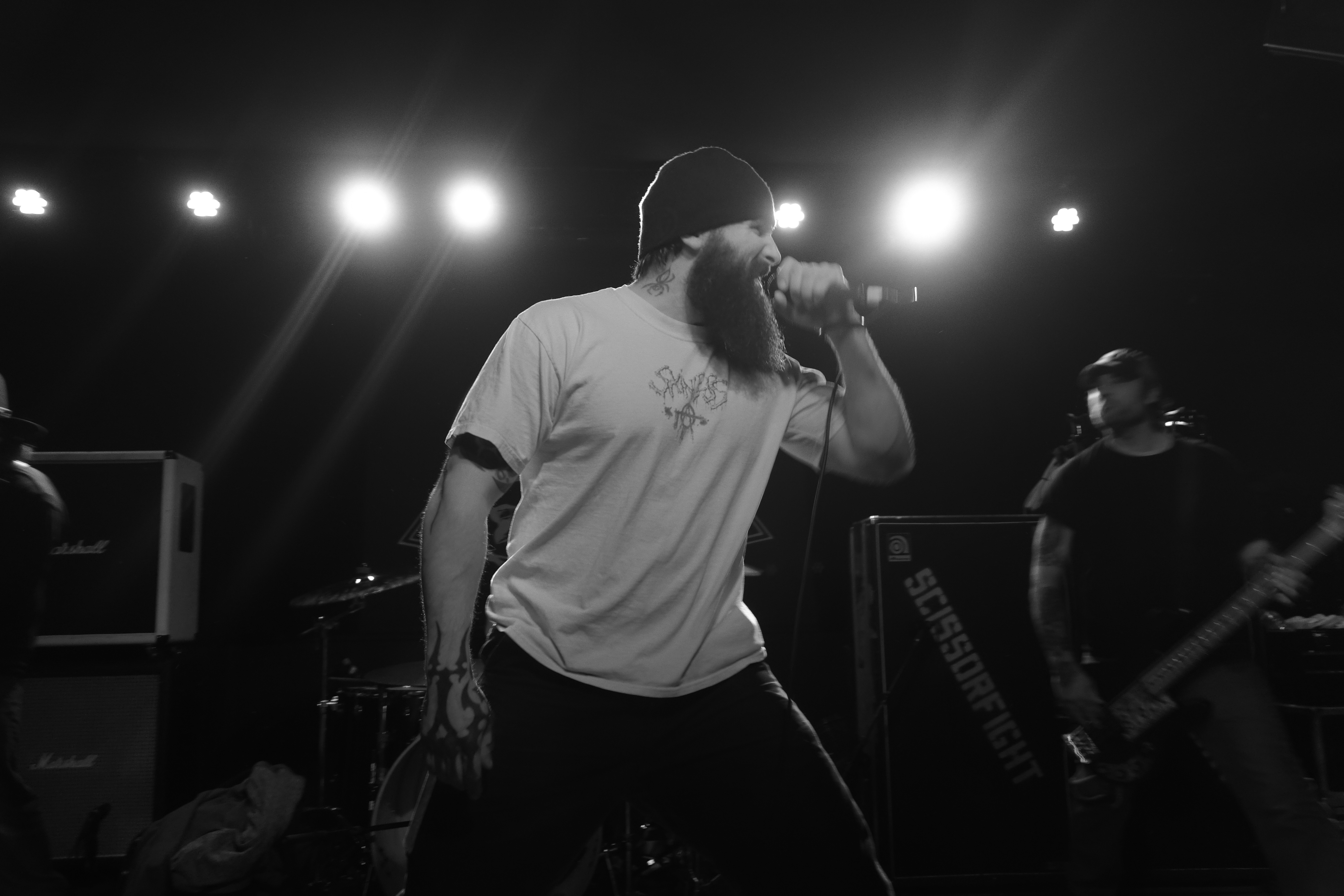
- Scissorfight performing in 2017

Background information
- Origin: Portsmouth, New Hampshire, U.S.
- Genres: Southern metal; crust punk; stoner metal
- Years active: 1995–2006; 2016–2025
- Labels: Wonderdrug; Tortuga; Salt of the Earth
- Members: Jay Fortin; Paul Jarvis; Doug Aubin; Rick Orcutt
- Website: scissorfight.com

Scissorfight was a four-piece American stoner metal band from Portsmouth, New Hampshire.

== Biography ==
Scissorfight formed in 1995 in the town of Portsmouth. The original lineup consisted of guitarist Jay Fortin, bassist Paul Jarvis, and drummer Joel Muzzey. Blending extreme genres such as grindcore and post-hardcore, the band hired vocalist Ironlung (named for his ability to take in illegal substances) to "stand there and look scary".

They recorded their debut, 1996's Guaranteed Kill. The band followed it up with 1998's Balls Deep. They signed with independent label Tortuga Recordings to release 1999's New Hampshire. The band played at River Rave festival, where they performed with Cypress Hill and Stone Temple Pilots. They released an EP of covers titled Piscataqua soon after, and were featured on MTV's "You Hear It First" segment. In 2001 the band released two albums, the original Mantrapping for Sport and Profit and an album of re-recorded songs to be released in Britain called American Cloven Hoof Blues. A series of EPs (Potential New Agent for Unconventional Warfare, Deathchants, Breakdowns and Military Waltzes, Vol. 2, and Victory over Horseshit) followed, with the full-length Jaggernaut arriving in March 2006. Scissorfight was named "best hard rock band" at the Boston Music Awards in 2003 and 2004.

After a nearly ten year hiatus, the band returned in 2016 with a new vocalist, drummer and EP titled Chaos County.

On July 7, 2025, the band announced they would be disbanding again after the conclusion of two farewell shows, with the final one taking place on September 20 at The Shaskeen in Manchester, New Hampshire.

== Members ==
=== Current ===
- Jay Fortin – guitar, multi-instrumentalist
- Paul Jarvis – bass
- Doug Aubin – vocals
- Rick Orcut – drums

=== Former ===
- Ironlung – vocals, songwriting
- Kevin Strongbow – drums
- Joel Muzzey – drums
- Jared Schofield - drums

== Discography ==
- Guaranteed Kill (Wonderdrug Records, 1996)
- Balls Deep (Wonderdrug Records, 1998)
- New Hampshire (Tortuga Recordings, 2000)
- Piscataqua (EP) (Tortuga Recordings, 2000)
- Mantrapping for Sport and Profit (Tortuga Recordings, 2001)
- American Cloven Hoof Blues (UK only) (Tortuga Recordings/Eccentric Man Recordings, 2002)
- Potential New Agent For Unconventional Warfare (EP)(Tortuga Recordings, 2002)
- Deathchants, Breakdowns and Military Waltzes Vol. 2 (EP) (Tortuga Recordings, 2003)
- Instant Live: Middle East – Cambridge, MA 11/13/04 (2004)
- Victory Over Horseshit maxi-single (Tortuga Recordings, 2006)
- Jaggernaut (Tortuga Recordings, 2006)
- Greatest Hits (Tortuga Recordings 2012)
- Chaos County (EP) (Salt of the Earth Records, 2016)
- Doomus Abruptus, Vol. 1 (2019)

== Compilations ==
- New Alliance Productions:Ten Years After(1999) "They Saved Hitler's Cock"(Angry Samoans)

== Digital Releases ==
- "Devil's Shingle" [2017]
- "Unfinished Business" [2018]
