= Christmas (Old Man Gloom album) =

Studio album by Old Man Gloom
- Released: August 24, 2004
- Genre: Sludge metal, post-metal, progressive rock
- Length: 61:10
- Label: Tortuga Recordings

Old Man Gloom chronology
Christmas Eve I and II + 6 (2003)	Christmas (2004)	No (2012)

Professional ratings
Review scores
Source	Rating
AllMusic	4/5 stars
Drowned in Sound	(9/10)
Stylus Magazine	C+

Christmas is the fourth studio album by Old Man Gloom, released in August 2004 by Tortuga Recordings. Aaron Turner, owner of Hydra Head Records and former Isis guitarist and vocalist, described this album in September 2010 as “one of the most engaging projects I have been involved with both musically and visually.”

== Critical reception ==
CMJ New Music Report wrote that the "carols ... alternate between propulsive, pummeling epic shit-kickers (opener 'Gift') and experimental noise tracks ('Accord-O-Matic')."

== Track listing ==
1. "Gift" – 5:47
2. "Skullstorm" – 0:51
3. "Something for the Mrs." – 5:44
4. "Sleeping With Snakes" – 2:33
5. "Lukeness Monster" – 2:54
6. "'Tis Better to Receive" – 1:25
7. "Accord-O-Matic" – 7:50
8. "The Volcano" – 7:32
9. "Close Your Eyes, Roll Back into Your Head" – 3:30
10. "Girth and Greed" – 1:33
11. "Sonic Dust" – 3:06
12. "Valhalla" – 2:08
13. "Christmas Eve parts I, II & III (alt. version)" – 16:17

== Personnel ==
- Nate Newton – guitar, vocals
- Santos "Hanno" Montano – drums, long hair, backup vocals
- Kurt Ballou – producer, drums on "Gift"
- Eugene Robinson – vocals
- Luke Scarola – electronics
- Caleb Scofield – bass, vocals
- Aaron Turner – guitar, vocals
- Nick Zampiello – mastering
