= A.M. Sixty =

- Genres: Indie pop
- Years active: 2001–present
- Labels: V2 Records
- Website: am60.com

A.M. Sixty (also known as AM60) is an indie pop group led by Chris Root.

== History ==
Chris Root first became well known as a member of The Mosquitos in the United States. In 2001, he formed the group A.M. Sixty, which became a phenomenon in the United Kingdom after Root sent UK labels some of his demos. His single, "Just a Dream", hit the UK charts and resulted in A.M. Sixty doing a Peel Session. After touring stadiums in Europe and Japan, A.M. Sixty signed with V2 Records, releasing the album Big as the Sky in 2004. Old Navy used their song Summertime Girlfriend in 2005 as part of their summer fashion line. In 2010-2011 Schwinn Bicycles used their song "Just a Dream" in their commercials

== Discography ==
- Tonite's the Nite (Shifty Disco, 2002)
- Always Music Sixty (Shifty Disco, 2003)
- Big as the Sky (V2 Records, 2004)
