= Black & White Rainbow =

EP by Milligram
- Released: March 20, 2001
- Genre: Stoner rock Alternative metal
- Length: 24:20
- Label: Tortuga Recordings

Black & White Rainbow is the companion CD of the CD/EP Hello Motherfucker! EP (2001 re-issue) by the "heavy stoner rock" band Milligram, released in 2001.

It consists of three original tracks, including the demo version (faster) of "My alternate Altamont" (which was re-released in its final version (slower) in the album This is class war) and five covers songs. Also included are two Misfits covers ("She" and "We Are 138"), two of Black Flag ("Fix Me" and "Jealous Again") and one of Fear ("Gimme Some Action").

== Track listing ==
No.	Title	Length
1.	"My Own Private Altamont (demo version)"	6:52
2.	"Not Okay"	4:01
3.	"Burntout Technics"	2:22
4.	"She (Misfits cover)"	1:22
5.	"Fix Me (Black Flag cover)"	0:50
6.	"Jealous Again (Black Flag cover)"	1:47
7.	"We Are 138 (Misfits cover)"	1:43
8.	"Gimme Some Action (Fear cover)"	5:19
Total length:		24:20
