= This Is Class War =

Studio album by Milligram
- Released: 2002 (Original release); February 25, 2003 (re-issue)
- Genre: Stoner rock, sludge metal, alternative metal
- Length: 67:39
- Label: TRAKTOR7 Records (2002); Small Stone Records (2003)

This is Class War is the first and only LP released by the Boston-based band Milligram. It was first released on the Jenkins's label TRAKTOR7 Records in 2002. It was re-released by Small Stone Records in 2003.

== History ==
The first 14 tracks from This is Class War were originally released in early 2002, in a limited pressing of 300 hand-stamped CDRs, sewn completely into cloth camouflage sleeves, with hand stamped, hand numbered digipaks, on TRAKTOR7 Records. The band broke up in summer 2002. In February 2003, Small Stone Records re-released the album. The latter version contains, in addition to the 14 original songs, more than 30 minutes of additional music, including most of the outtakes, some remixes (drums and voice only, to illustrate that a majority of the distortion is on the drums) plus tracks of the ambient/noise (generated on a Mac G3/266, in SoundEdit) that used to be played before and during Milligram live sets.

== Track listing ==
2002 – original release (TRAKTOR7 Records)

No.	Title	Length
1.	"Let's Kill"	3:13
2.	"Jeff's Flag"	1:37
3.	"Let's Pretend We Don't Know Each Other"	2:03
4.	"+2 Charisma"	0:57
5.	"Thousands and Thousands and Thousands and Thousands"	1:58
6.	"Get Fucked Again"	1:11
7.	"I Know, I'm Sorry"	2:33
8.	"Summer of Lies"	2:46
9.	"Nice Problem"	2:09
10.	"Winner Versus Loser"	1:37
11.	"Saturation Emission"	2:49
12.	"She's a Prostitute"	3:34
13.	"The Resentinel"	3:59
14.	"This Is Class War"	3:02
Total length:		33:35

2003 – Small Stone Records re-issue (bonus tracks)

No.	Title	Length
15.	"Baikal Depths"	0:46
16.	"Baikal Shallows"	0:30
17.	"A Mess On Strom Thurmond's Dress (drums and vocals only)"	1:43
18.	"Let's Kill (drums and vocals only)"	1:59
19.	"Constant Sucking Sensation"	1:44
20.	"Emblematic Sac"	0:42
21.	"Sadegh Hedayat (drums only)"	1:25
22.	"I Know, I'm Sorry (drums only)"	2:23
23.	"A Thousand Cuts"	0:48
24.	"Urdu Is An Amalgam"	0:57
25.	"Death To America"	12:17
26.	"My Own Private Altamont (Slower version) (bonus track)"	8:09
27.	"$"	0:36
Total length:		34:03
