= Ehnahre =

- Origin: Boston, Massachusetts, U.S.
- Genres: Avant-garde, experimental music, avant-garde metal, chamber music, contemporary classical music
- Years active: 2006–present
- Label: Crucial Blast Records
- Members: Ryan McGuire (vocals, bass, contrabass); Joshua Carro (percussion, electronics); Richard Chowenhill (guitars); Jared Redmond (pianos)
- Past members: John Carchia, Brandon Terzakis, D.J. Murray, Ricardo Donoso, Tom Malone, Andrew Hock, Brendan MacDonald,Herbie Correia

Ehnahre is an American experimental extreme metal ensemble and contemporary composition collective, based in Boston, Massachusetts, United States. Their music incorporates elements of contemporary classical music, aleatoric music, doom metal, and death metal, and utilizes extended techniques, aleatoric rhythms, aspects of serialism, and elements from free improvisation, contemporary chamber music, and extreme metal styles.

According to critic and composer Matthew Guerrieri, Ehnahre's music, "fueled by dissonance, constantly slips free of such genre expectations", "[unfolding] in heavy, slow-moving clouds of sound". Although their compositions are fixed, usually in conventional notation, their dense rhythms, harmonies, and avoidance of repetition often draw comparisons from free jazz and free improvisation. They do not write their own lyrics, choosing instead to set texts by great modernist poets.

== Discography ==
=== Studio albums ===
- The Man Closing Up (2008)
- Taming the Cannibals (2010)
- Old Earth (2012)
- Douve (2015)
- The Marrow (2017)
- The Scrape of a Keel: Drones and Improvisations (2019)

=== Collaborative albums ===
- Jacob (2021) - with N

=== EPs ===
- Alpha/Omega (2010)
- Nothing and Nothingness (2016)
- Rites for Winter (2018) - with Hadean
- Quatrain (2020) - cassette

=== Live albums ===
- Pipeline (2009)

=== Demos ===
- Negative Reasoning (2001)
