= Cast Iron Hike =

American post-hardcore band

Background information
- Origin: Clinton, Massachusetts, U.S.
- Genres: Post-hardcore; alternative metal
- Years active: 1994–1997
- Labels: Big Wheel Recreation, Trustkill, Victory

Cast Iron Hike was an American post-hardcore band from Clinton, Massachusetts.

== History ==
Cast Iron Hike was formed after the breakup of Worcester hardcore band Backbone, and featured that group's drummer (Dave Green) and guitarist (Chris Pupecki). They began by playing shows on the East Coast before releasing material in the mid and late 1990s in rapid succession, including EPs on Big Wheel Recreation and Trustkill Records, as well as a full-length on Victory Records. The group split up in the winter of 1997. Since then, guitarist Michael Gallagher went on to join Isis and to start MGR; Chris Pupecki currently plays guitar in both Doomriders and Blacktail; Dave Green is a university professor and the author of When Children Kill Children: Penal Populism and Political Culture (Oxford University Press); singer Jake Brennan has continued as a solo artist and as a member/producer of Bodega Girls; Pete deGraaf has played bass in a number of bands, such as Villain and CLEARTHEWAY, and works as a sound engineer.

== Members ==
- David Green – drums
- Christian Pupecki – guitar
- Jake Brennan – vocals
- Michael Gallagher – guitar
- Peter deGraaf – bass

== Discography ==
=== Full Length ===
- Watch it Burn (Victory Records, 1997)

=== Extended plays ===
- The Salmon Drive EP (Big Wheel Recreation, 1995)
- Cast Iron Hike EP (Trustkill Records, 1996)

=== Splits ===
- Shoot, Knife, Strangle, Beat and Crucify (GG Allin cover) split 7-inch with Miltown (Hatin' Life Records, 1997)
