= Quintaine Americana =

American hard rock band

- Origin: Boston, Massachusetts
- Genres: Hard rock
- Years active: 1995–present
- Labels: CherryDisc, Roadrunner, Curve of the Earth, Traktor7
- Members: Rob Dixon : Vocals, guitar Marc Schleicher : Bass guitar Jason King : Drums; Pete Valle : Guitar
- Website: MySpace page

Quintaine Americana is a hard rock band from Boston (but with deep Southern roots) that started out in 1995.

== History ==
Singer/guitarist Rob Dixon and drummer Jason King both hail from the small town of Drew, Mississippi and moved to Boston in the late 1980s. Bassist Marc Schleicher grew up in Norwell, Massachusetts but family reunions brought him to Alabama on a regular basis. In 1996 they released their debut album and placed second in the WBCN Rock & Roll Rumble (the Boston battle of the bands since 1979). Their second album was released on major label Roadrunner Records. They toured the US with Karma to Burn, but were most popular in New England. Their third full-length was co-produced by Andrew "Mudrock" Murdock, who came back to Boston to help out because he thought that they were "a great band" whose "recordings have [never] properly captured them." In early 2001 they added a second guitarist, Pete Valle. Quintaine's last album was released in 2004. The band's name was inspired by a character from an episode of Tales from the Crypt—Billy Quintaine.

== RedneckFest ==
The RedneckFest is an annual event celebrating the music and culture of the South, curated by Quintaine. Inspiration came to the band after the record release party for their debut album, Needles, which featured 12 bands. Subsequent years saw the musical styles represented broaden to include bluegrass, rockabilly, country, and Southern rock, along with punk, hard rock, and stoner rock. In 2001 the Fest spanned four nights at three different clubs and featured 21 bands.

== Discography ==
=== Albums ===
- Needles (1996, CherryDisc)
- Decade of the Brain (1998, Roadrunner)
- The Devil Went Down to Mississippi EP (2000, Curve of the Earth)
- Dark Thirty (2003, Curve of the Earth)
- Sharpshooter Blues (2004, Traktor7)

=== Compilation appearances ===
- Take Your Medicine (1996, Wonderdrug) (song: "Retarded Whore")
- Wicked Deluxe (1996, Wicked Disc) (song: "Black Car")
- Allston Rock City (1997, Curve of the Earth) (song: "Aunt Ruth")
- Up the Dosage (1999, Wonderdrug) (song: "The Good Stuff")

=== Other ===
- split single w/Milligram (1999, Polterchrist Records/TRAKTOR7 Records) (song: "Rebel Yell")

== Sources ==
- Off the Record, Sean Richardson, Boston Phoenix, June 25, 2004.
- Dark-Thirty with Quintaine Americana, Sanjay, Lab Productions, April 21, 2002
- Decade of the Brain, Joe Garden, The A.V. Club, March 29, 2002
- Local petal and munk, Carly Caroli, Boston Phoenix, December 28, 2000.
- Laugh Tracks, Jon Garelick, Boston Phoenix, March 9, 1998.
- Profile at MusicMight
