= Slipped Disc Records =

- Company type: Music retailer
- Founded: 1982, closed 2008
- Headquarters: Valley Stream, New York, United States
- Owner: Mike Schutzman
- Website: slippeddiscrecords.com

Slipped Disc Records (which closed in 2008) was an American record store located in Valley Stream, New York, on Rockaway Avenue – owned/operated by Mr. Mike Schutzman – and was one of Long Island's longest running record stores. Specializing in heavy metal, punk, and hardcore CDs, records, DVDs, shirts, posters, pins, books, and other accessories, the store had also featured in-store autograph signing sessions with some of rock's biggest acts over the years. The store was featured in the documentary Get Thrashed, and an official website was launched for online shopping. Sip This (a coffee house) is now located where Slipped Disc Records used to be.

== History ==
Slipped Disc Records opened in 1982, and according to an article in Metal Edge magazine, Schutzman reflected upon the store's early days, "There weren't many stores then that were specializing in metal, hardcore, and punk. We hit it at the right time, even though people told us it wasn't a good time." The store flourished by selling a wide variety of domestic and hard-to-find import albums and accessories as well as a large catalogue of used CD's and albums. Sadly, Slipped Disc closed its doors on April 19, 2008, after being open for over 25 years. Schutzman is still known to sell vinyl at record shows that cater to collectors and enthusiasts. Dream Theater drummer and veteran Slipped Disc shopper Mike Portnoy had some nice words and memories to say about the store in a posting at the Blabbermouth site the same day it closed. As of 2015, Schutzman organizes and oversees an ongoing record show in various locations in the northeast of the U.S., called Vinyl Revolution Record Show.

== Other information ==
- Some bands/artists that have done autograph signings at Slipped Disc include Mick Taylor (9 June 1990), Metallica, Slayer, Megadeth, Motörhead, Twisted Sister, Rob Halford, Ronnie James Dio, Zakk Wylde, Sepultura, and Merciless Death among others. Vintage pictures from autograph signing sessions can be viewed online at the official Slipped Disc site.
- On February 17, 2007, a 20-second commercial for Slipped Disc was aired four times on Headbangers Ball.
- A theater used to be located across the street from Slipped Disc, the Rio Theater, which featured performances in the early-mid 1980s by Slayer, Metallica, and Alcatrazz (with Yngwie Malmsteen), among others. It has since been demolished.
- Schutzman was interviewed for (and featured throughout) the 2015 book, Survival of the Fittest: Heavy Metal in the 1990s, by author Greg Prato.
