= Raw Radar War =

American hardcore band

- Origin: Boston, Massachusetts, U.S.
- Genres: Hardcore punk, sludge metal, crust punk
- Years active: 2002–present
- Labels: Chainsaw Safety, Shifty, TRAKTOR7, Land o' Smiles, Game Two
- Members: Jonah Jenkins; Charles Corey; Mike Cahill; Pat Tapia; Mario Travers
- Past members: Scott Gallagher; Quinn Matt Dillon

Raw Radar War is an American hardcore punk band formed in Boston in 2002. Formerly called Septic Youth Command, the band was formed by Jonah Jenkins in 2002 after Milligram's disbanding. The band title, Raw Radar War, is a palindrome, it can be read from both sides with equal meaning.

== Members ==
Current

- Jonah Jenkins – vocals
- Charles Corey – bass guitar
- Mike Cahill – drums
- Pat Tapia – guitar
- Mario Travers – guitar

Former

- Scott Gallagher – guitar
- Quinn Matt Dillon – guitar

== Discography ==
Year	Album
2007	Double Equals "==": Released: 2007; Label: TRAKTOR7 Records/Shifty Records (CD version); Label: Land o' Smiles (12" vinyl LP version)

=== EPs ===
Year	Album
2007	Raw Radar War/Deer Creek split: Released: 2007; Label: Game Two Records

=== 7" singles ===
2007

- Pharmacopoeia : Volume One (5 × 7" vinyl – box set compilation) limited pressing of 250 copies (Land o' Smiles)

Vinyl n°1
No.	Title	Length
1.	"Loser Porch – Noosebomb (Side A)"	5:00
2.	"Cat Skulls Are Thick – Fistula (Side B)"	6:17

Vinyl n°2
No.	Title	Length
1.	"Self Harm – Misanthrope Project (Side A)"	3:47
2.	"Ravens Creed – Ravens Creed (Side B)"	2:56

Vinyl n°3
No.	Title	Length
1.	"Decapitated Crawl (Morbid Way To Die Mix) – Coffins (Side A)"	4:01
2.	"Vestigal Hands – Fossegrimen (Side B)"	6:23

Vinyl n°4
No.	Title	Length
1.	"Blood For Kali – Witch Lord (Side A)"	6:45
2.	"Turn into Dust – Kongh (Side B)"	6:21

Vinyl n°5
No.	Title	Length
1.	"Skull White Stone – Deadbird (Side A)"	6:23
2.	"Dies Easily And Bleeds Well / Police Bastard – Raw Radar War (Side B)"	2:30

- Raw Radar War/Deadbird split (from Pharmacopoeia : Volume One) limited pressing of 50 copies (Land o' Smiles)

Side A
No.	Title	Length
1.	"Skull White Stone – Deadbird"	6:23

Side B
No.	Title	Length
2.	"Dies Easily And Bleeds Well / Police Bastard – Raw Radar War"	2:30

2011

- On A Field Of White (Chainsaw Safety Records)

Side A
No.	Title	Length
1.	"This Is What A Knife Is For"	1:46
2.	"All Arrows In"	1:00
3.	"Warwolf"	1:11

Side B
No.	Title	Length
1.	"Defend Finland"	1:53
2.	"On A Field Of White"	1:34

=== Compilation appearances ===
2010

- This Is Good: A Tribute To Black Flag limited edition of 98 copies, on cassette only (Land o' Smiles)

Have contributed with track "Spraypaint" – 0:55

2017

- Death Kiss: Volume 1 CD and online (Death Kiss V.1 on Bandcamp)

contributed with track "Pride Of The Ignorant" – 02:07
