= Ravens Creed =

English death/thrash metal band

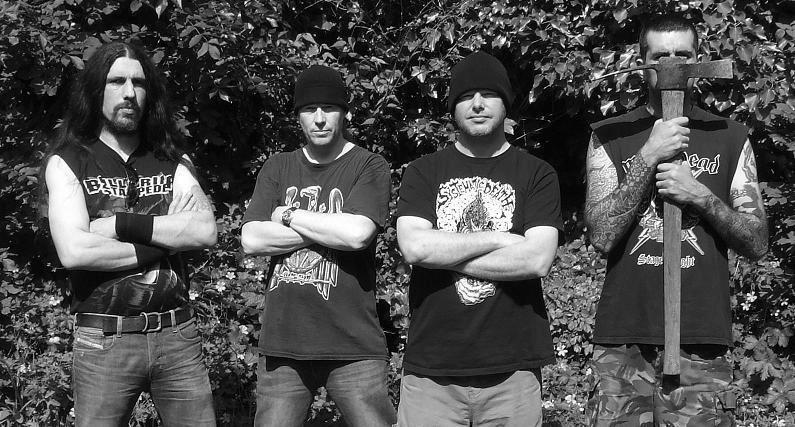
- Rod Boston, Jay Graham, Steve Watson, Al Osta (circa 2012)

Background information
- Origin: Nottingham, England
- Genres: Thrash metal, death metal
- Years active: 2006–present
- Labels: Doomentia, Xtreem, Metal Bastard
- Members: Jay Graham; Steve Watson; Al Osta; Rod Boston
- Past members: Ben Ward; Martyn Millard; Frazer Craske; James Kiely

Ravens Creed are an English death/thrash metal band formed in Nottingham in 2006 by Jay Graham and Steve Watson. The line-up has changed since 2006 with Graham and Watson being the only consistent members. The current line-up, as of 2012, consists of Al Osta (vocals), Steve Watson (guitar), Rod Boston (bass) and Jay Graham (drums). As of December 2021, the band have released five albums, three EPs, one live album and one split release. In 2009, Ravens Creed released their debut album Albion Thunder on Doomentia Records.

Since formation the band have performed at various festivals including Hard Rock Hell, Bloodstock Open Air, High Voltage Festival and Live Evil Festival. After a string of releases with Doomentia Records, in April 2015, the band announced via their official Facebook page they had signed a deal with Xtreem Music. After two further releases, in February 2021, the band announced they had signed with Metal Bastard Enterprises to create a fifth album, Give War a Chance, which was released 27 August 2021.

== History ==
In 2006, Ben Ward and Martyn Millard (Orange Goblin) joined Graham and Watson on vocals and bass respectively. After the line-up was complete, the band recorded a four-track EP entitled Militia of Blood Sacrifice, which was released in 2007 on Land O'Smiles. After Militia of Blood Sacrifice, in January 2008, Millard left the group and was subsequently replaced by ex-Sabbat bassist Frazer Craske. After Craske joined, in May 2008 the band embarked on the Albion Thunder Tour across the UK, shortly after the tour the band announced they had parted ways with lead guitarist James Kiely to revert to a four-piece, that year they also performed at Hard Rock Hell II (Second Stage, Saturday) and Bloodstock Open Air (Scuzz Stage, Sunday). Following on from these performances, the band released a two-track EP entitled Neon Parasite (2009) on Doomentia Records, recorded at Jay Graham's own Tenko Studios, and their debut album Albion Thunder (2009). Ravens Creed then released a split single with Sollubi (on Hydro-Phonic Records) in 2010, this is the last release to feature vocalist Ben Ward. Ward left on 2 February 2010 and was replaced by current vocalist Al Osta in summer 2010.

With Osta on board the band pushed forward and went on to perform at High Voltage Festival (Metal Hammer Stage) in July 2011, from this came their first live album and first release with Osta, High Voltage Festival Recorded Live July 2011 (2011). That same year, Nestless and Wild (EP) was also released, this was the first studio recording to feature new vocalist Al Osta, they were also featured on the compilation album Voices From Valhalla - A Tribute to Bathory (2012) performing For All Those Who Died, the band also played Live Evil Festival (Saturday).

In 2012, Ravens Creed released their second album on Doomentia Records entitled The Power (recorded at Tenko Studios), this was the last release to feature Craske on bass, he was replaced by Bull-Riff Stampede bassist Rod Boston in May 2012, this was also the last release on Doomentia Records. Ravens Creed departed Doomentia Records publicly via their official Facebook page on 12 May 2014 citing delayed releases as the reason, as well as announcing Idi, which was planned to be the band's fourth EP but subsequently never released. For the next 3 years the band performed across the UK, including Damnation Festival (Eyesore Merch Stage) in 2012. It was announced on 3 April 2015 via their official page that they had signed with Xtreem Music, on which they released their third album Ravens Krieg (2015), which was reviewed by Metal Hammer and gave it 3.5/5 stars, and their fourth Get Killed or Die Trying (2018).

On 10 January 2020, the band announced via their page that they had fulfilled their contractual obligations with Xtreem Music, while announcing their fifth album title Give War a Chance. On 20 February 2021, Ravens Creed posted a teaser video to Facebook, regarding an upcoming announcement, the band followed up the following day announcing they have signed with Metal Bastard Enterprises, stating a summer release in 2021. On 28 June 2021, the band announced the release date of the upcoming fifth album, which released 27 August 2021.

== Line-up ==
=== Current members ===
- Jay Graham – drums (2006–present) (ex-Skyclad, ex-The Clan Destined, ex-Tony Iommi session player, Rift)
- Steve Watson – guitar (2006–present) (ex-Cerebral Fix, Iron Monkey)
- Al Osta – vocals (2010–present) (ex-Cerebral Fix)
- Rod Boston – bass (2012–present) (Keltic Jihad, Bull-Riff Stampede, Rift)

=== Former members ===
- Ben Ward – vocals (2006–2010) (Orange Goblin)
- Martyn Millard – bass (2006–2008) (ex-Orange Goblin)
- Frazer Craske – bass (2008–2012) (ex-Sabbat)
- James Kiely – guitar (2007–2008) (GBH, Geezer Butler)

== Discography ==
=== Studio albums ===
- Albion Thunder (Doomentia Records, 2009)
- The Power (Doomentia Records, 2012)
- Ravens Krieg (Xtreem Music, 2015)
- Get Killed or Die Trying (Xtreem Music, 2018)
- Give War A Chance (Metal Bastard Enterprises, 2021)

=== Live albums ===
- High Voltage Festival Recorded Live July 2011 (2011)

=== EPs ===
- Militia of Blood Sacrifice (Land O'Smiles, 2007)
- Neon Parasite (Doomentia Records, 2009)
- Nestless & Wild (Doomentia Records, 2011)

=== Split releases/compilations ===
- Ravens Creed / Sollubi (split release with Sollubi, Hydro-Phonic Records, 2010)
- For All Those Who Died on Voices From Valhalla - A Tribute to Bathory (Godreah Records, 2012)
