= Milligram (band) =

American rock band from Boston

- Origin: Boston, Massachusetts, United States
- Genres: Stoner rock, alternative metal, hardcore punk
- Years active: 1996–2002
- Labels: Tortuga Recordings; TRAKTOR7 Records; Small Stone Records; Overcome Records (France)
- Members: Jonah Jenkins; Darryl Shepard; Zephan "Zeph" Courtney; Jeff Turlik
- Past members: Bob Maloney

Milligram was an American rock band from Boston active from 1996 until 2002. It comprised Jonah Jenkins, Darryl Shepard, Zephan Courtney and Jeff Turlik.

== Biography ==
Formed by Jonah Jenkins and Darryl Shepard in 1996, Milligram had no permanent drummer. Shepard continued playing in Roadsaw, while Jenkins formed Miltown. After a predictably "major" label battle between Miltown and Warner Brothers/Giant Records, Jenkins returned to Milligram in 1998. After recruiting Bob Maloney on bass guitar and Zephan Courtney (StompBox, Juliana Hatfield, Chevy Heston) on drums, the Hello Motherfucker! EP CD/EP was recorded.

In late 1999, Milligram parted ways with Bob Maloney and recruited Jeff Turlik (Blue Man Group, StompBox, Roadsaw) on bass guitar. The Hello Motherfucker! EP CD/EP was released on April 28, 2000, on Tortuga Recordings. On March 20, 2001, the Hello Motherfucker! CD/EP was re-released with a bonus companion CD : Black & White Rainbow. Their next release, which was originally titled Death To America, was scheduled to be recorded starting on September 11, 2001, at the New Alliance Studios in Boston, but because of the 9/11 events, recording was pushed back to three days in November, 2001, with the final recording finished over three days in February, 2002. The release was also renamed This Is Class War. Fourteen songs from This Is Class War were originally released in a limited pressing of 300 hand-stamped CDRs on Jenkins's label, TRAKTOR7 Records.

The band broke up in summer 2002. Though they had disbanded only a few months earlier, the Milligram's final sessions were taken up by Small Stone Records and released on February 25, 2003, with more than 30 minutes of bonus material such as outtakes or remixes (drums and voices only).

In 2011, Milligram reformed to play at the Palladium with Kyuss Lives in Worcester, Massachusetts.

== Band members ==
- Jonah Jenkins – vocals
- Darryl Shepard – guitar, piano
- Zephan "Zeph" Courtney – drums
- Bob Maloney (1996–1999) – bass guitar
- Jeff Turlik (1999–2002) – bass guitar

== Discography ==
Year	Album
2001	Hello Motherfucker! (2001 re-issue): Released: March 20, 2001; Label: Tortuga Recordings
2003	This Is Class War: Released: 2002; Label: TRAKTOR7 Records; Re-released: February 25, 2003; Label: Small Stone Records

== EPs ==
Year	Album
2000	Hello Motherfucker! EP: Released: April 28, 2000; Label: Tortuga Recordings
2001	Black & White Rainbow (companion CD): Released: March 20, 2001; Label: Tortuga Recordings

== 7" vinyl ==
1999

Milligram/Quintaine Americana split 7-inch (Polterchrist Records) limited pressing of 300 copies, colored vinyl
No.	Title	Length
1.	"Nervous Breakdown (Black Flag cover) – (Milligram) (Side A)"	1:58
2.	"Rebel Yell (Billy Idol cover) – (Quintaine Americana) (Side B)"	4:15

2002

Milligram s/t 7-inch (Superfi Records) limited pressing of fewer than 400 copies
No.	Title	Length
1.	"Mean Machine (Motörhead Cover) (Side A)"	2:58
2.	"Back Seat of my Car (Dwarves cover) (Side A)"	1:09
3.	"The Resentinel (Side B)"	3:59

== Compilation appearances ==
2001

- Music With Attitude: Volume 31

Have contributed with track "Not Okay" – 4:01

2002

- Sucking the 70s

Have contributed with track "Rumblin' Man" a cover song of the band Cactus – 3:47
