= Tortuga Recordings =

- Genre: Sludge metal Stoner metal Doom metal Post-metal; Noise; Experimental rock Black metal Metalcore; Mathcore; Hip hop
- Country of origin: United States
- Official website: www.tortugarecordings.com/news/index.htm

Tortuga Recordings is an American heavy metal record label.

== List of Tortuga Recordings releases ==
Cat #	Artist	Title	Format	Year
TR-.05	Reach the Sky	Demo		
TR-001	The Gersch	The Gersch	7"	1997
TR-002	Seven Day Curse	The Color Blood [demo]		
TR-003	Various artists	Metal is a Tough Business [compilation]	CD	
TR-004	Seven Day Curse	After the Storm	CD	
TR-005	Non Compos Mentis	The Rats Know Him	CD	1999
TR-006	Scissorfight	New Hampshire	CD	1999
TR-007	Old Man Gloom	Meditations in B	CD	1999
TR-008	Isis	Sawblade	12"	2000
TR-009	Scissorfight	Piscataqua	CD-EP	2000
TR-010	Milligram	Hello Motherfucker! EP	CD-EP	2000
TR-011	5ive	5ive	LP/CD	2001
TR-012	Roadsaw	Rawk and Roll	2×LP	2000
TR-013	Old Man Gloom	Seminar II: The Holy Rites of Primitivism Regressionism	CD	2001
TR-014	Old Man Gloom	Seminar III: Zozobra	CD	2001
TR-015	Isis	SGNL>05	12"	2001
TR-016	5ive	The Telestic Disfracture	CD	2001
TR-017	Milligram	Black & White Rainbow	CD-EP	2001
TR-018	Scissorfight	American Cloven Hoof Blues	CD	2002
TR-019	Scissorfight	Mantrapping for Sport and Profit	CD	2001
TR-020	Quitter	Untitled	CD-EP	
TR-021	5ive	The Hemophiliac Dream EP	CD-EP	2003
TR-022	Scissorfight	A Potential New Agent for Unconventional Warfare	CD-EP	2002
TR-023	Old Man Gloom	Christmas	CD	2004
TR-025	Dukes of Nothing	War & Wine	CD-EP	2003
TR-026	Scissorfight	Deathchants, Breakdowns and Military Waltzes Vol. 2	CD-EP	2001
TR-027	Old Man Gloom	Christmas Eve I and II + 6	CD-EP	2003
TR-028	Tusk	Tree of No Return	CD	2004
TR-037	5ive	Hesperus	CD	2008
TR-074	The Theory of Abstract Light	The Theory of Abstract Light	CD	2002
