= Matthew Kelly (The Autumns) =

American singer, guitarist, songwriter, and historian

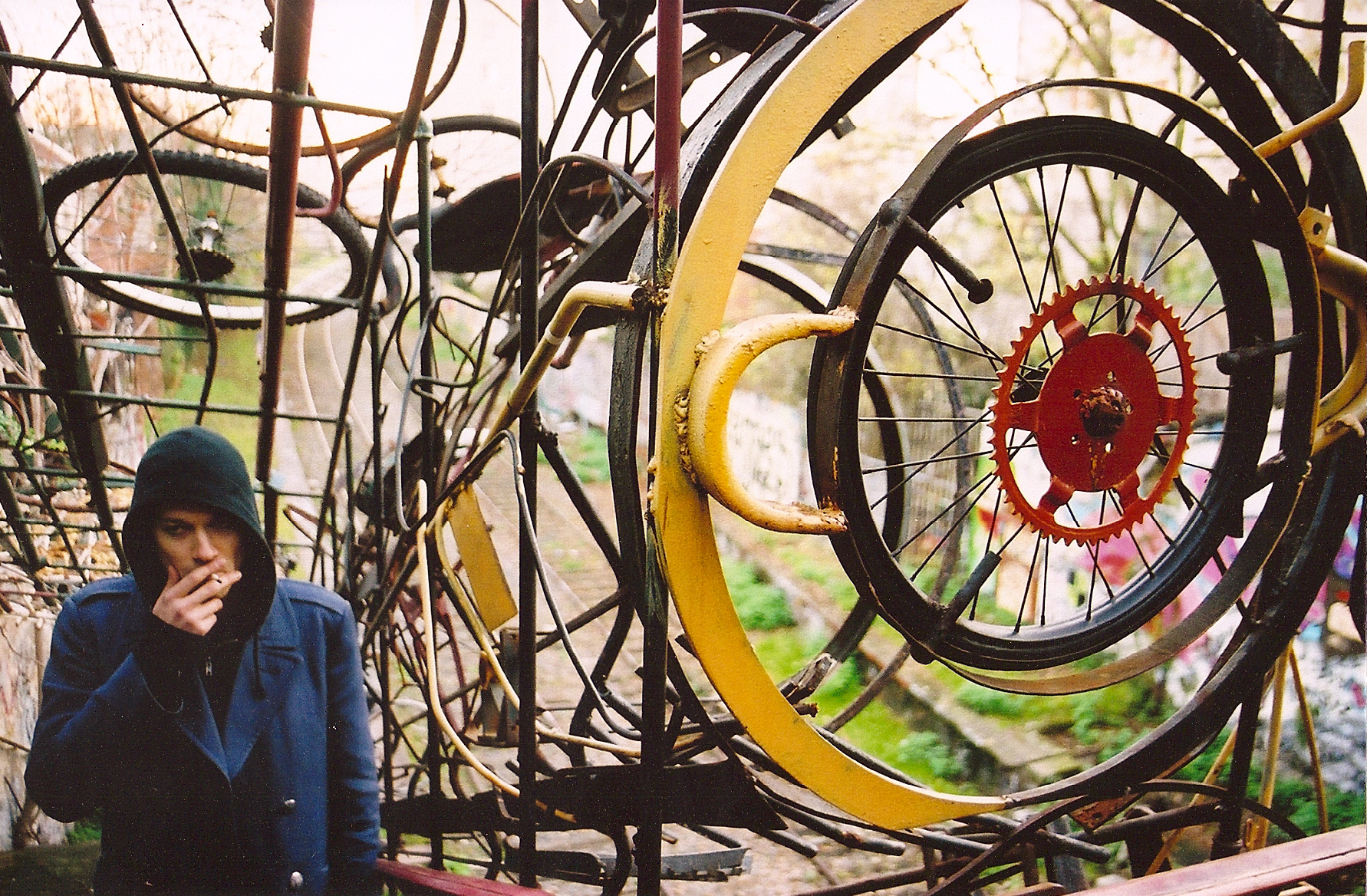
- Matthew Kelly, Paris 2009

Background information
- Genres: Rock

Matthew Kraig Kelly is an American singer, guitarist, songwriter, and historian.

Kelly is best known for his work with the influential LA rock band The Autumns, which he fronted for more than a decade (1997–2008).

He is also a member of the experimental post-punk collective The Sound of Animals Fighting, and the black-metal-inspired Pyramids.

In addition to his musical output, Kelly is a historian of the modern Middle East. He holds a PhD from the University of California at Los Angeles (UCLA), has published several articles in professional journals, and is the author of a forthcoming book with the University of California Press.

Kelly currently resides in Los Angeles with his wife, the dancer and choreographer Tammie Rose Johnston. They have one son.

== The Autumns ==
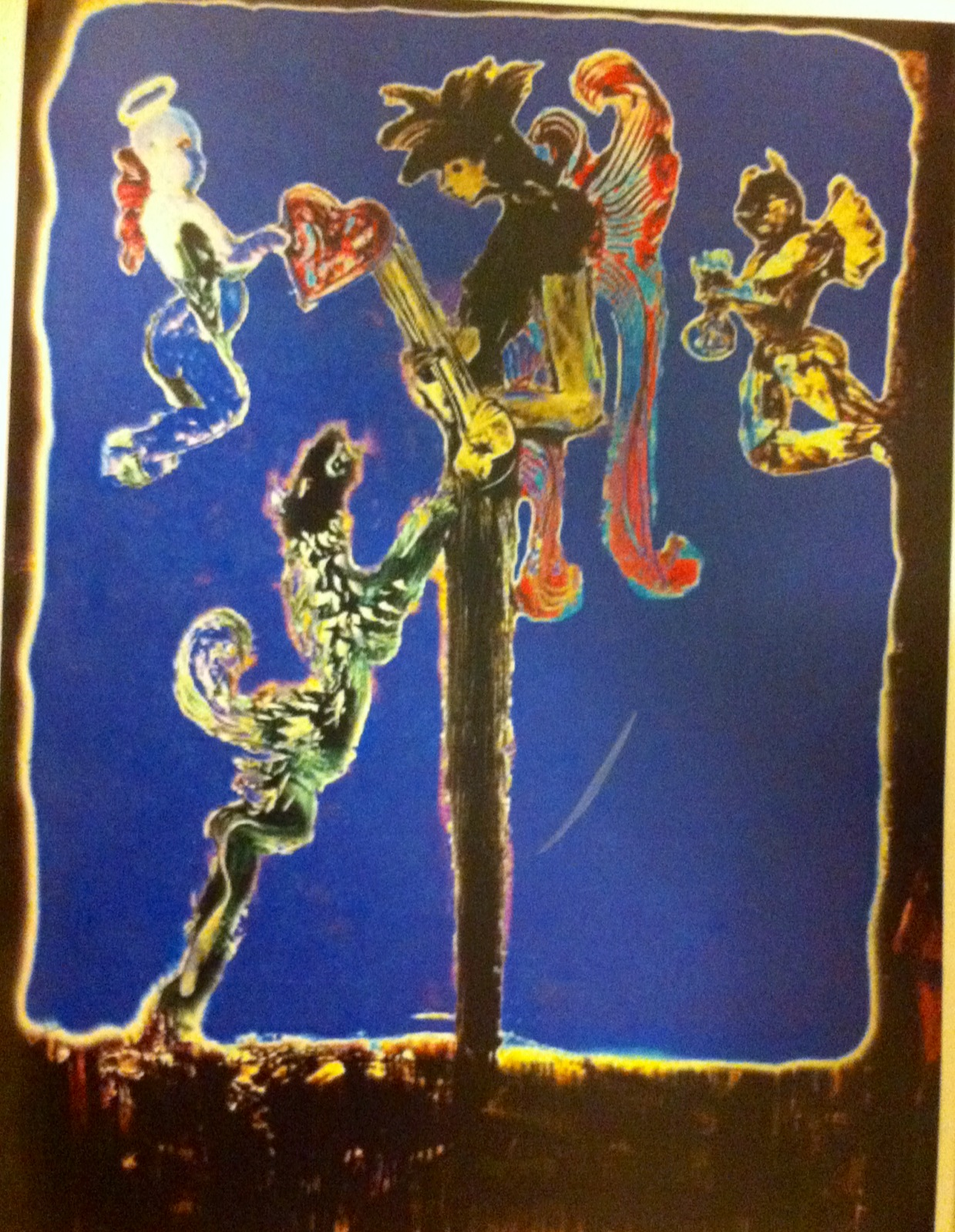
Portrait of Matthew Kelly by Norton Wisdom

The Autumns' career began in 1997, when the band released the EP Suicide at Strell Park and, shortly thereafter, the LP The Angel Pool. Both records garnered a good deal of critical acclaim, especially The Angel Pool. Flipside called it a "hypnotic pop masterpiece." All Music Guide deemed it a "fine debut" that featured "an alluring mix of power and beauty."

Word of the LP soon spread to Europe, where it caught the ear of Simon Raymonde, whose band Cocteau Twins was among The Autumns’ primary influences.

In 2000, Raymonde produced 'The Autumns’ second album, In the Russet Gold of this Vain Hour. He went on to release the band's third and fourth albums––The Autumns (2004) and Fake Noise from a Box of Toys (2008)––on his prestigious London-based recording label, Bella Union. The self-titled album was a hit with the British press. It won four-star reviews in MOJO, NME, The Times of London, and other high-profile outlets. Critics were more ambivalent about Fake Noise. NME memorably wrote that it sounded like "Sigur Ros getting hurt in a free jazz boot camp." Filter took a different view, declaring that Fake Noise proved The Autumns were "everything that other bands wish they were."

The Autumns also expanded their discography with a number of EPs, including Winter in a Silver Box (1998), the 50s-themed Le Carillon (2001), and the covers collection Covers (2001). The band released several singles (with exclusive b-sides) as well. These included Boy with the Aluminum Stilts (2000), Every Sunday Sky (2004), Boys (2008), and Killer in Drag (2009). In addition, they put out a limited edition split 7-inch with Denton, Texas band Lift to Experience, 2000's "White Nights"/"Calling out to Jesus in the Middle of the Night."

== The Sound of Animals Fighting ==
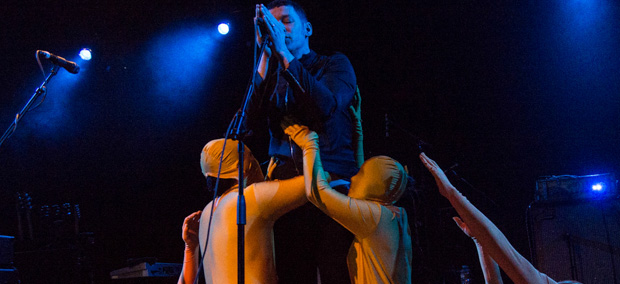
The Sound of Animals Fighting (Best Buy Theater 2014)

In 2006, avant-garde producer R. Loren (Rich Loren Balling)––whose collaborators include Lydia Lunch, Alec Empire, and Vern Rumsey––conscripted Kelly into the post-punk collective The Sound of Animals Fighting. Kelly lent his vocal and songwriting talents to the album Lover, The Lord Has Left Us (Equal Vision). Adopting the moniker "The Wolf", he collaborated with Loren ("The Nightingale") and RX Bandits’ Matt Embree ("The Walrus") to produce the Persian-infused track "My Horse Must Lose", as well as the album's closer, "The Heretic."

Kelly also appeared on The Sound of Animals Fighting's third album, The Ocean and the Sun (Epitaph), where he again sang on the closing track ("On the Occasion of Wet Snow").

Awareness of TSOAF's cult status spread when the group performed a series of sold out shows on the West Coast in 2006, which were captured on the live DVD We Must Become The Change We Want To See. In 2014, the band performed another short series of shows, this time on both coasts, selling out a number of large venues (including the Best Buy Theater in Times Square NYC and Los Angeles’ Wiltern Theatre).

== Pyramids ==
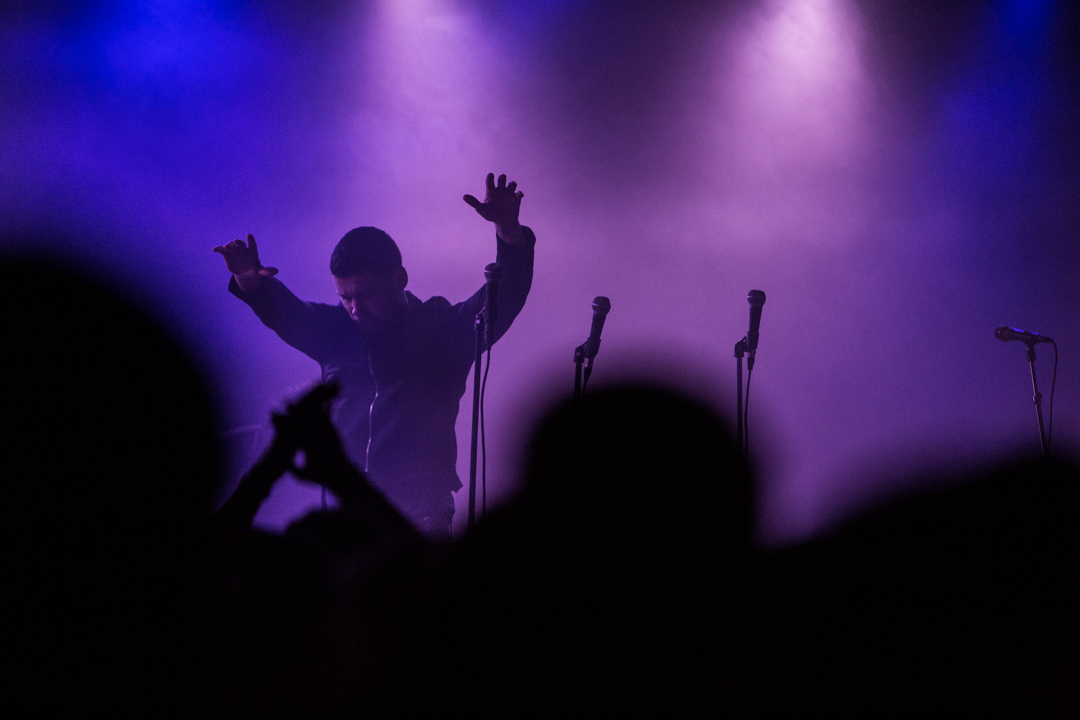

In 2007, Kelly and Loren collaborated on another project, Pyramids.

Pyramids released its debut, self-titled album in 2008 on Hydra Head Records. The record's dissonant, arhythmic aesthetic captivated the press, from The Wire to Pitchfork. The latter characterized the album as an "unapologetic post-rock assault", the product of "a formidable talent."

Drowned In Sound called it "totally weird and totally new." Decibel claimed that the record had "redefined grimness for a generation." Terrorizer deemed it "a beguiling nightmare of an album." In the end, All Music Guide may have said it best: "There is no other music like this out there."

Pyramids’ subsequent collaborations with Nadja (Pyramids with Nadja), Windy and Carl (and 49 others, on the five-cassette box-set Wvndrkmmer), Wraiths (Magpie and Raven), Horseback (A Throne Without a King), and a split with Mamiffer, evoked similarly passionate reactions the world over. In 2015, Canadian label Profound Lore released A Northern Meadow, again to rave reviews.

== Soviet League, Minus Music ==
In 2010, Kelly teamed up with Sugarplastic's Ben Eshbach to write and record an album of richly melodic pop. The result was the Phil-Spector- and Brian-Wilson-inspired Soviet League. Few critics seemed to notice the record, but those who did regarded it as one of the year's best.

Kelly then joined forces with Evol Intent's Knick Weiller to produce a short EP entitled Minus Music (2012).

== Future projects ==
In 2015, Kelly performed twice, both times in Los Angeles with acclaimed singer-songwriter Josh T. Pearson. With Madison Megna (The Autumns) and Gaby Graves (Glass Graves) accompanying, he played several new songs, which are rumored to be part of a forthcoming album, although it is unknown with which project the album will be associated.

== Discography ==
- Suicide at Strell Park (1997) – The Autumns
- The Angel Pool (1997) – The Autumns
- Winter in a Silver Box (1998) – The Autumns
- In the Russet Gold of This Vain Hour (2000) – The Autumns
- Le Carillon (2001) – The Autumns
- Covers (2001) – The Autumns
- White Nights / Calling Out to Jesus in the Middle of the Night (2001) – The Autumns / Lift to Experience
- Gift (2003) – The Autumns
- The Autumns (2004) – The Autumns
- Every Sunday Sky (2004) – The Autumns
- Tiger and the Duke (2005) – The Sound of Animals Fighting
- Lover, the Lord Has Left Us... (2006) – The Sound of Animals Fighting
- Tiger and the Duke: reissue (2007) – The Sound of Animals Fighting
- Fake Noise from a Box of Toys (2008) – The Autumns
- Boys (2008) – The Autumns
- Pyramids (2008) – Pyramids
- The Ocean and the Sun (2008) – The Sound of Animals Fighting
- Killer In Drag (2009) – The Autumns
- Pyramids with Nadja (2009) – Pyramids
- Soviet League (2010) – Soviet League
- Into the Silent Waves: Ulver and Lustmord remixes (2010) – Pyramids
- A Throne Without A King (2011) – Pyramids/Horseback
- Mamiffer/Pyramids (2012) – Mamiffer/Pyramids
- Magpie and Raven (2012) – Pyramids with Wraiths
- Minus Music (2012) – Minus Music
- A Northern Meadow (2015) – Pyramids
- Apeshit (2022) – The Sound of Animals Fighting
- Pythagoras (2025) - Pyramids
- The Maiden (2025) - The Sound of Animals Fighting
