= Mandala (Rx Bandits album) =

Studio album by Rx Bandits
- Released: July 21, 2009
- Recorded: 2008–2009
- Genre: Progressive rock
- Length: 52:40
- Label: Sargent House
- Producer: Chris Fudurich

Rx Bandits chronology
...And the Battle Begun (2006)	Mandala (2009)	Gemini, Her Majesty (2014)

Professional ratings
Review scores
Source	Rating
AllMusic	3.5/5 stars
idiomag	Favorable
Consequence of Sound	Positive
PopMatters	5/10 stars

Mandala is the sixth full-length studio album from Rx Bandits. Released on July 21, 2009, it is the band's second album released through Sargent House, and their first as a 4-piece band.

== Writing and production ==
Between July and September 2008, the band toured across the US with Portugal. The Man and Maps & Atlases. The band began writing and recording the album in late 2008 with producer Chris Fudurich, who had produced 2 of the band's prior full-length albums: 2001's Progress and 2003's The Resignation. At some point early in the album's development, trombone player Chris Sheets left the band for undisclosed reasons. The album does feature horns on a few tracks, such as "Bury It Down Low" and "Bled To Be Free (The Operation)", which were provided by Nat Love (The English Beat) and Steve White. The album was completed in the spring of 2009. Throughout the production of Mandala, the band shared video updates documenting their progress. A companion DVD was later released, featuring studio footage from the recording sessions as well as an acoustic performance at Saint Rocke in May 2009, and other previously unreleased videos.

== Artwork ==
The album artwork was created by visual artist Sonny Kay. The band posted the album artwork on their blog along with a video featuring an animated version of the artwork and a 30-second clip from a new song.

== Release ==
On May 13, 2009, Mandala was announced via a trailer. Two days later, the album's track listing and artwork was posted online. On June 16, 2009, "Hope Is a Butterfly, No Net Its Captor, She Beats Her Wings and Softly Sings of Summer Scent and Children's Laughter... (Virus of Silence)" was posted online; nine days later, "Bring Our Children Home or Everything Is Nothing" was available for download through ReverbNation. In July and August 2009, they went on a co-headlining US tour with Dredg; they were supported by Good Old War, Zechs Marquise for the first half, and As Tall as Lions for the second half. Mandala was made available for streaming on July 21, 2009, before being released on July 28, 2009, through Sargent House. The album's press release promised a "more rock-oriented four-piece, scaling down the use of horns to create a new twist to their constantly evolving dynamic." On June 18, 2009, the album was made available for pre-order with several different packages available.

The album was leaked onto the internet through various filesharing sites on June 26, 2009. The album was later released digitally a week early through Amazon MP3 as a special deal for $2.99. As a result of the sale, the album reached #1 on Amazon's Bestselling MP3 Albums on July 16, 2009. In November 2009, the band supported Glassjaw at a few of their Californian shows. Following a stint in Australia as part of the Soundwave festival, the band went on a North American tour through to April 2010, with support from the Builders and the Butchers and Zechs Marquise. During three of the New York shows, the band performed three of their albums in their entirety, including Mandala; the trek also included a performance at Coachella. In August 2010, the band performed at the Reading and Leeds Festivals in the UK. They repeated the album performances on the West Coast across three days in September 2010.

The album peaked at #117 on the U.S. Billboard 200. It also peaked #3 on the top heatseekers chart and #23 on the independent albums chart.

== Track listing ==
All lyrics are written by Matthew Embree; all music is composed by Rx Bandits.

No.	Title	Length
1.	"My Lonesome Only Friend"	4:03
2.	"It's Only Another Parsec..."	4:44
3.	"Hope Is a Butterfly, No Net Its Captor, She Beats Her Wings and Softly Sings of Summer Scent and Children's Laughter... (Virus of Silence)"	4:23
4.	"Hearts That Hanker for Mistake"	4:31
5.	"Mientras la Veo Soñar"	6:36
6.	"March of the Caterpillar"	4:12
7.	"White Lies"	4:30
8.	"Bury It Down Low"	3:33
9.	"Breakfast Cat"	5:16
10.	"Bled to Be Free (The Operation)" (Lyrics co-written by Joe Troy)	4:37
11.	"Bring Our Children Home or Everything Is Nothing"	6:19

== Personnel ==
- Matt Embree - vocals, guitar
- Steve Choi - guitar, keyboards, backing vocals
- Joseph Troy - bass, backing vocals
- Chris Tsagakis - drums
