= We Must Become the Change We Want to See =

Video by The Sound of Animals Fighting
- Released: May 1, 2007
- Recorded: 2007
- Genre: Experimental rock
- Label: Equal Vision
- Producer: Rich Balling

The Sound of Animals Fighting chronology
Lover, the Lord Has Left Us... (2006)	We Must Become the Change We Want to See (2007)	The Ocean and the Sun (2008)

We Must Become the Change We Want to See is the first live DVD from The Sound of Animals Fighting, released on May 1, 2007. The DVD includes footage from one of the only four shows the band has played as of 2007. The show was filmed live at the House of Blues in Anaheim, California on August 27, 2006. The name "We Must Become the Change We Want to See" is taken from a Mahatma Gandhi quote.

Throughout the set, Fritz Lang's 1927 film Metropolis is projected behind the band. It was rated four stars by Punknews.org.

== Track listing ==
1. "The Heretic (a cappella)"
2. "Act I: Chasing Suns"
3. "Act II: All is Ash or the Light Shining Through It"
4. "Act III: Modulate Back to the Tonic"
5. "Un'aria"
6. "Skullflower"
7. "My Horse Must Lose"
8. "Horses in the Sky"
9. "Stockhausen, es ist Ihr Gehirn, das ich Suche"
10. "This Heat"
11. "Act IV: You Don't Need A Witness"

== The cast ==
Position	Name	Animal
Vocals	Rich Balling (Formerly of Rx Bandits)	Nightingale
Bass	Joseph Troy (Rx Bandits)	Octopus
Drums	Chris Tsagakis (Rx Bandits)	Lynx
Lead Guitar, Vocals	Matt Embree (Rx Bandits)	Walrus
Guitar, Keyboard	Steve Choi (Rx Bandits)	Koala
Vocals	Anthony Green (Circa Survive)	Skunk

== Featuring ==
Position	Name	Animal
Vocals	Craig Owens (Chiodos) (D.R.U.G.S.)	Ram
Vocals, Guitar	Keith Goodwin (Good Old War)	Penguin
Percussion	Chris Sheets (Rx Bandits)	Dog
Percussion, Sampling	Ryan Baker	Hyena
Vocals, Guitar	Matthew Kelly (The Autumns)	Wolf
Keyboard	Bradley Bell (Chiodos)	

- Bradley Bell from Chiodos is the only musician that is not given an animal name (this may be because he never appeared on any of the studio recordings), he also is wearing a mask and is completely cloaked in black as he performs
