= Zechs Marquise =

American psychedelic rock band

- Genres: Psychedelic rock, progressive rock, instrumental rock
- Years active: 2003–2013 (currently on hiatus)
- Labels: Rodriguez Lopez Productions via Sargent House
- Members: Marcos Smith; Matthew Wilkson; Marfred Rodriguez-Lopez; Marcel Rodriguez-Lopez; Rikardo Rodriguez-Lopez
- Past members: Michael Farraro
- Website: https://zechsmarquise.bandcamp.com

Zechs Marquise was an American psychedelic rock band, formed in El Paso, Texas in 2003.

== History ==
The band was formed in the fall of 2003 by members Marcel (keyboards/percussion), Marfred Rodriguez-Lopez (bass), Marcos Smith (guitar), and Matthew Wilkson (guitar) and Michael Farraro (drums). Originally going by the name of Monolith, the instrumental outfit later decided to take the name Zechs Marquise from the main antagonist of the anime series Gundam Wing. Zechs Marquise quickly created a stir in their hometown and built a solid fan base within the southwest cities that they had visited on the road. During the late summer months of 2004 the band hit the studio to record its first album. That studio effort was later scrapped and instead in June 2006 the band released 34:26 EP, a live improvised set culled from their frequent west coast tours. By fall of 2006, Zechs was touring the west coast consistently, sharing the stage with such eclectic acts as Daedelus, Busdriver, The Album Leaf, DJ Nobody, Daddy Kev, The Gaslamp Killer, and Totimoshi.

July 2007 saw the band return to the recording studio. Having learned from the difficulties of their first attempt, the quintet decided to keep all of the recording in house, purchasing a mixing board, microphones, and Pro Tools in order to track all of the recordings themselves. After a few days in their studios, dubbed Castle Greyskull and El Morro, the members realized they had enough material for a full-length album. The record, Our Delicate Stranded Nightmare, was completed in February 2008. This became band's last release to feature Farraro, who left the band soon after recording, which led to Marcel Rodriguez-Lopez switching to drums. In March 2009, the band made its first adventure overseas to Europe, opening for Omar Rodriguez-Lopez Group, in which Marcel was also a member. In May, Zechs Marquise signed on to the management roster at Sargent House and released Our Delicate Stranded Nightmare on LP/CD/digital in August of that year through Rodriguez-Lopez Productions.

In the years since their debut album, Zechs Marquise toured extensively throughout the U.S., proving to be a formidable live act supporting Omar Rodriguez-Lopez Group and Rx Bandits as well as leading their own headlining tours. In 2010, they started working on their second full-length album. Considering the hectic tour schedules of both Zechs Marquise and The Mars Volta (in which Marcel Rodriguez-Lopez played keyboards and percussion), the band was forced to work on the album over an extended period of time in between both band's tours. Marfred Rodriguez-Lopez said, "It gave us a lot of time to get perspective on the songs. We're really happy with and proud of this record." The album, titled Getting Paid, was finally released on September 27, 2011. The album was entirely produced and engineered by Marcel. "We started off recording percussion to sequencers and loops. I chopped those sounds up and arranged them. From there, we wrote the album with each of us coming in and playing on top of it. Kind of like a hip-hop song." Parts were composed by Marcel Rodriguez-Lopez using the studio as a tool, and later the band re-recorded the album live to represent their live energy. During the re-recording process additional parts were written by each individual musician in order to complement the original structure that Marcel Rodriguez-Lopez had formulated for the album. Getting Paid for the first time featured vocals on select songs, including guest performances by vocalist/guitarist Matt Embree (RX Bandits, The Sound of Animals Fighting) and El Paso singer Sunny Baker. 2011 saw Rikardo Rodriguez-Lopez (the youngest of Rodriguez-Lopez brothers) joining the band on keyboards.

== Band members ==
=== Current ===
- Marcel Rodriguez-Lopez - drums (2009–present), keyboards, synths (2003–present)
- Marfred Rodriguez-Lopez - bass (2003–present)
- Marcos Smith - guitar (2003–present)
- Matthew Wilkson - guitar (2003–present)
- Rikardo Rodriguez-Lopez - keyboards (2011–present)

=== Former ===
- Michael Farraro - drums (2003-2008)

== Discography ==
=== Studio albums ===
- Our Delicate Stranded Nightmare (2008), Willie Anderson Recordings/Rodriguez Lopez Productions via Sargent House
- Getting Paid (2011), Rodriguez Lopez Productions via Sargent House

== Videography ==
- "Everlasting Beacon of Light" (2011)
