= Pebaluna =

Folk band based in Long Beach, California

- Origin: Long Beach, California, United States
- Genres: Folk, Indie Rock
- Years active: 2012–present
- Members: Matt Embree; Lauren Coleman; Jessica Lankford; Jonathan Grillo
- Website: Pebaluna.com

Pebaluna is a folk band based in Long Beach, California. The group was founded in 2006 after the lead vocalist Lauren Coleman and Matt Embree met and began recording music. They are influenced by a combination of Blues, R&B, Folk, Country, Jazz and Indie Rock. The band consists of four members, lead vocalist Lauren Coleman, guitarist Matt Embree, drummer Jessica Lankford and bassist Jonathan Grillo.

== History ==
A number of the band members had music careers before becoming members of Pebaluna. Lauren Coleman was the lead vocalist on Gavin Castleton’s album Home as well as singing and writing lyrics for The Sound of Animals Fighting track "Uzbekistan". Matt Embree is the lead vocalist for RX Bandits and a founding member of The Sound of Animals Fighting. The first official track released by the band was "No I Can’t".

== Carny Life ==
The band released their debut album Carny Life on September 18, 2012. Before the album's release, the band released the track "Sister Sarah". The song is “an observation of the human condition; the mortal body which delights in instant gratification, and the soul or spirit which is trying its hardest to remain steadfast for a certain purpose" vocalist Lauren Coleman told American Songwriter. Carny Life received good reviews with a number of folk music magazines.

Prior to the release of Carny Life, the band announced 5 tour dates in California. The band has played regularly at The Hotel Café and has opened for Andrew McMahon of Jack’s Mannequin and Something Corporate.
