= Siren's Song =

A siren song typically refers to the song of the siren, dangerous creatures in Greek mythology who lured sailors with their music and voices to shipwreck.

(The) Siren Song or (The) Siren's Song may also refer to:

== Films and literature ==
- The Siren's Song (1919 film), a lost 1919 film starring Theda Bara
- The Siren Song, the second book in the Pirates of the Caribbean: Jack Sparrow series

== Music ==
=== Albums ===
- Siren's Song (album), a 2011 album by The Union of American Brothers in collaboration and with other members
- Song of the Sirens, a 2020 album by GFRIEND
- Siren Song of the Counter Culture, an album by American punk rock band Rise Against

=== Songs ===
- "Siren Song" (Erasure song), 1991
- "Siren Song" (Maruv song), 2019
- "The Siren's Song", a song by metalcore band Oh, Sleeper from their debut album When I Am God
- "The Siren's Song", a song by metalcore band Parkway Drive from their second album Horizons
- "Siren Song", a song by Jerry Cantrell from his 2021 album Brighten
- "Siren Song", a song by metal band Mutoid Man from their third album Mutants
- "Sirens Song", a song by metalcore band Miss May I from their third album At Heart

== Television ==
- "Siren's Song", a 2002 episode of Charmed
- "The Siren's Song", a 2011 episode of Scooby-Doo! Mystery Incorporated

== See also ==
- Siren (disambiguation)
- The Siren Song of Stephen Jay Gould, a one-act play by Benjamin Bettenbender
