= Tiger and the Duke =

Studio album by The Sound of Animals Fighting
- Released: February 15, 2005
- Recorded: Unknown
- Genres: Post-hardcore, experimental rock, art rock, ambient
- Length: 34:08 (Original edition); 71:39 (reissue)
- Labels: Stars And Satellites Records (Original edition); Equal Vision Records (reissue)
- Producer: Rich Balling

The Sound of Animals Fighting chronology
Tiger and the Duke (2005)	Lover, the Lord Has Left Us... (2006)

Reissue cover
- The reissue cover of Tiger and The Duke.

Professional ratings
Review scores
Source	Rating
AbsolutePunk	84%

Tiger and the Duke is the debut studio album by the experimental rock band The Sound of Animals Fighting. Four songs from this album were released in demo form on a 2004 EP of the same title.

It is a concept album revolving around the title character, Duke, and the captain who runs the ship they are sailing. The cargo of the ship are crazy animals who howl and fight below the deck. Eventually the captain's sons start a mutiny in which the captain jumps off the ship.

The album was reissued via Equal Vision Records on June 26, 2007. The reissue features all tracks remixed, with new interludes, and new artwork by Drew Roulette of dredg and Dark Heavens and packaging along with eight remixes from Lover, The Lord Has Left Us.... The album peaked at 35 on the Billboard Top Heatseekers chart.

== Track listing ==
1. "Overture" – 1:29
2. "Act I: Chasing Suns" – 5:13
3. "Interlude" – 2:30
4. "Act II: All Is Ash or the Light Shining through It" – 4:19
5. "Interlude" – 2:39
6. "Act III: Modulate Back to the Tonic" – 4:50
7. "Interlude" – 1:53
8. "Act IV: You Don't Need a Witness" – 5:21
9. "Postlude" – 5:54

== Re-issue track listing ==
1. "Overture" – 3:26
2. "Act 1: Chasing Suns" – 5:10
3. "Interlude" – 2:22
4. "Act 2: All Is Ash or the Light Shining through It" – 4:21
5. "Interlude" – 3:12
6. "Act 3: Modulate Back to the Tonic" – 4:50
7. "Interlude" – 2:26
8. "Act 4: You Don't Need a Witness" – 4:45
9. Untitled – 0:04
10. Untitled – 0:04
11. Untitled – 0:04
12. Untitled – 0:04
13. "Un'aria Elettronica (Technology remix)" – 8:25
14. "My Horse Must Lose (Portugal. The Man remix)" – 4:42
15. "De-Ceit (Portugal. The Man remix)" – 3:12
16. "This Heat in Dub (Technology remix)" – 5:01
17. "Skullflower: Sorcerer's Mix (Portugal. The Man remix)" – 4:59
18. "Horses in the Sky (Live Version)" – 5:46
19. "St. Broadrick, His Mistress, and the Blacksmith (The Optimist remix)" – 3:59
20. "The Heretic (Evol Intent remix)" – 4:47

== Personnel ==
Position	Name	Animal
Producer, Vocals	Rich Balling (RX Bandits)	Nightingale
Lead Guitar	Matt Embree (RX Bandits)	Walrus
Drums	Chris Tsagakis (RX Bandits)	Lynx
Guitar	Randy "R2K" Strohmeyer (Finch)	Tiger
Bass	Derek Doherty (Finch)	Tortoise
Vocals	Anthony Green (Circa Survive)	Skunk
Mixing & Programming	Chris Fudurich	Bear
Artwork	Marc Mcknight (Atreyu)	Raven
Public Relations	Vanessa Chibba	Swan
Author	Chris Haynie	Dog
Engineer	Kyle Homme	Ferret
Patrone	Charlie Adams	Octopus
Engineer, Vocals	Rich Zahniser (The Hippos)	Armadillo
Vocals	Matthew Kelly (The Autumns)	Llama
Recording, Mixing	Ryan Baker	Hyena
