= Hangin' Nothin' but Our Hands Down =

Studio album by Nurses
- Released: June 6, 2007
- Recorded: 2006
- Genre: Indie rock Experimental rock
- Length: 35:56
- Label: Sargent House

Professional ratings
Review scores
Source	Rating
Pitchfork Media	6.9/10

Hangin' Nothin' but Our Hands Down is the debut album by Portland-based indie rock band Nurses, self-released in 2006. It was re-released by Sargent House in 2007.

== Critical reception ==
Pitchfork Media wrote that the album "comes with its own set of eccentricities to justify an otherwise grandiose, ambitious, Radiohead/Muse sound." The Chicago Tribune called it "an impressive opening shot, swinging from the ramshackle, back-porch country of 'Marching In Places' to 'And Now the Curse of Marjorie,' which layers on twitchy riffs and stuttered drums until it sounds like Chapman is performing in a futuristic construction zone."

== Track listing ==
1. "And Now the Curse of Marjorie" – 3:11
2. "Alone at Last" – 2:00
3. "Lots of Brass" – 3:36
4. "He Gots" – 2:22
5. "Hungry Mouth" – 3:05
6. "Wait for a Safe Sign" – 3:18
7. "Way Up High" – 2:07
8. "Act Now, You're King!" – 3:18
9. "Gettin' Angry" – 3:16
10. "It Came in a Flash" – 2:39
11. "Dem Leaves" – 4:05
12. "Marching in Places" – 3:04

== Personnel ==
- Aaron Chapman - vocals
