= Anyone but You (disambiguation) =

Anyone but You is a 2023 American romantic comedy film.

Anyone but You may also refer to:

- "Anyone but You", song by James from the 2024 album Yummy
- "Anyone but You", song by Jewel from the 2008 album Perfectly Clear
- "Anyone but You", song by Rx Bandits from the 2001 album Progress

== See also ==
- Anyone but Me, 2008 American web series by Tina Cesa Ward
