= War Moans =

Studio album by Mutoid Man
- Released: June 20, 2017
- Studio: GodCity, Salem, Massachusetts
- Genre: Stoner rock, hardcore punk, sludge metal, heavy metal, rock'n'roll
- Length: 38:36
- Label: Sargent House
- Producer: Kurt Ballou

Mutoid Man chronology
Bleeder (2015)	War Moans (2017)	Mutants (2023)

Singles from War Moans
- 1. "Kiss of Death" Released: May 2, 2017; 2. "Date With The Devil" Released: June 9, 2017; 3. "Micro Aggression" Released: Feb 28, 2021

Professional ratings
Review scores
Source	Rating
Punknews.org	4/5 stars
Tiny Mix Tapes	4.5/5 stars

War Moans is the second studio album by American heavy metal band Mutoid Man, released on June 20, 2017 through Sargent House.

== Track listing ==
War Moans track listing
No.	Title	Length
1.	"Melt Your Mind"	2:10
2.	"Bone Chain"	2:21
3.	"Micro Aggression"	2:30
4.	"Kiss of Death"	3:38
5.	"Date with the Devil"	2:53
6.	"Headrush"	2:28
7.	"Irons in the Fire"	3:29
8.	"War Moans"	3:38
9.	"Wreck and Survive"	3:11
10.	"Afterlife"	3:10
11.	"Open Flame"	4:26
12.	"Bandages"	4:42
Total length:		38:36

== Personnel ==
Mutoid Man

- Stephen Brodsky – lead vocals, guitar, additional engineering
- Nick Cageao – bass, backing vocals
- Ben Koller – drums, percussion

Additional musicians

- Marty Friedman – lead guitar (track 8)
- Chelsea Wolfe – vocals (tracks 9 and 12)
- Ben Chisholm – synthesizer (tracks 9 and 12), layout
- Kurt Ballou – additional guitar (tracks 4 and 12)
- Adam McGrath – extra guitar (track 7)

Production

- Kurt Ballou – production, mixing
- Brad Boatright – mastering
- Pat McCusker – engineer
- Alex Garcia-Rivera – drum technician
- Robert Cheeseman – studio assistant
- Santos Illustraiton – artwork
- Jason Zuocco – photography
