= Bleeder (album) =

Studio album by Mutoid Man
- Released: June 30, 2015
- Studio: GodCity, Salem, Massachusetts
- Genre: Hard rock, progressive metal, speed metal, hardcore punk, thrash metal, rock'n'roll
- Length: 29:04
- Label: Sargent House
- Producer: Kurt Ballou

Mutoid Man chronology
Helium Head (EP) (2013)	Bleeder (2015)	War Moans (2017)

Singles from Bleeder
- 1. "Bridgeburner" Released: Jan 28, 2015; 2. "Sweet Ivy" Released: April 24, 2015; 3. "Reptilian Soul" Released: May 19, 2015; 4. "1000 Mile Stare" Released: June 11, 2015

Professional ratings
Aggregate scores
Source	Rating
Metacritic	79
Review scores
Source	Rating
Pitchfork	7.4/10 stars
Consequence	B-
Metal Hammer	4/5 stars

Bleeder is the debut studio album by American heavy metal band Mutoid Man, released on June 30, 2015, through Sargent House.

== Track listing ==
No.	Title	Length
1.	"Bridgeburner"	3:02
2.	"Reptilian Soul"	2:52
3.	"Sweet Ivy"	3:04
4.	"1000 Mile Stare"	2:21
5.	"Surveillance"	1:46
6.	"Beast"	1:58
7.	"Dead Dreams"	2:32
8.	"Soft Spot in My Skull"	2:24
9.	"Deadlock"	3:11
10.	"Bleeder"	5:54
Total length:		29:04

== Style ==
Sonically, Bleeder contains influences of speed and thrash metal, early hardcore punk, rock'n'roll, NWOBHM, sludge metal, stoner rock, and psychedelic rock. Dan Caffrey from Consequence noted that Bleeder has a more polished sound than on Mutoid Man's debut EP Helium Head, where there is more emphasis on singing than "the constant yowl Brodsky put forth on Helium Head." Pitchfork has considered Bleeder to have metallic hardcore in their sound that also includes "both numbskull hard rock and cerebral progressive metal, at a time when the two approaches have become almost mutually exclusive in heavy music."
