= Rich Balling =

American musician, producer, and curator

- Also known as: R. Loren, Rich Loren, The Nightingale
- Genres: Post-hardcore, indie rock, experimental rock, shoegazing
- Occupations: Singer-songwriter, musician, producer, teacher
- Instruments: Vocals, electronics, trombone
- Years active: 1995–present
- Labels: Hydra Head, Epitaph, Equal Vision, Small Doses, Aurora Borealis, Drive-Thru, MCA
- Formerly of: Pyramids, Sailors With Wax Wings, White Moth, The Sound of Animals Fighting, Rx Bandits

Rich Balling (also known as R. Loren or Rich Loren) is an American musician, producer, and curator. He is best known for being a former member of Rx Bandits. He is also known for his work in Pyramids, The Sound of Animals Fighting, and being the editor of two books Revolution on Canvas and its sequel Revolution on Canvas 2.

Balling is currently involved in a number of projects using his first initial and middle name, R. Loren: Pyramids, Sailors With Wax Wings, and White Moth.

== Career ==
=== Rx Bandits ===
His career started with Rx Bandits, when the band was founded in 1995 and he worked at Drive-Thru Records during the early stages of the label. In 2001, after the tours on the release of their third album "Progress", Balling left the band, citing frustrations he had with certain aspects of the music industry.

=== Revolution on Canvas ===
After leaving Rx Bandits, Balling lectured on music and the music industry as an adjunct faculty member at California State University, Fullerton, and worked as a music buyer for Hot Topic Inc., where his interests moved into anthologizing poetry, essays, and art created by himself and other musicians who he knew while recording and touring with Rx Bandits. He went on to curate and edit the book Revolution on Canvas: Poetry From the Indie Music Scene, which was published by Warner Books (now Grand Central Publishing) in 2005, and received with critical acclaim.

In 2007, Balling went on to publish a sequel to the book, entitled Revolution on Canvas 2: Poetry From the Indie Music Scene, again through Warner Books.

=== The Sound of Animals Fighting ===
In 2004, while in the process of publishing the two books, Balling continued his music career by founding the experimental rock band The Sound of Animals Fighting, and went on to release three albums. In 2005, the band self-released "Tiger and the Duke", which received positive reviews in the media, and was reissued in 2007 by Equal Vision Records with new artwork by Drew Roulette (Dredg), and included bonus remixes curated by Balling from notable artists such as Portugal The Man, and Evol Intent. The success of the first album led the supergroup to release two more albums.

Balling became heavily influenced by the art of found poetry through his work with the Revolution on Canvas book series. In 2006, Equal Vision Records released the unorthodox "Lover, The Lord Has Left Us..." an album crafted in the found poetry style, whose theme is homage to the band's contemporaries, as evident in its song titles and lyrics, many of which were gathered from the very releases that inspired the experimental tendencies of the band. The album's title was fashioned in the same way, when Balling approached Gared O’Donnell (Planes Mistaken For Stars) to donate a phrase that could be used for the album, and ironically, homage to Gared. The phrase "Lover, The Lord Has Left Us…" is the first lyric in a song that at the time had not been released by Planes Mistaken For Stars, but later appeared on their album "Mercy". The album layout was done by Stephen O’Malley also known as Sunn O))).

“The Ocean and the Sun" was released by Epitaph Records in 2008 with artwork by Seldon Hunt.

On November 11, 2013, Balling announced The Sound of Animals Fighting would be performing the following March, seven years after their first and only other concerts.

=== Pyramids ===
After the release of the third album with The Sound of Animals Fighting, Balling, having relocated from California to North Texas, moved onto his next project, Pyramids, where he would begin to record under his first initial and middle name: R. Loren, in order to forge a new musical direction free of influence from past projects. Since 2008, the band has released three full-length albums on Hydra Head Records, titled "Pyramids", which contained bonus remixes by notable artists including Jesu, Blut Aus Nord, and Birchville Cat Motel, "Pyramids with Nadja" which included cameos from Simon Raymonde of Cocteau Twins and Chris Simpson of Mineral, and a collaboration with Horseback titled "A Throne Without A King". In addition, Pyramids released two EPs "Mamiffer/Pyramids" (Hydra Head Records) and "Pyramids With Wraiths" (Aurora Borealis), a five cassette box titled "Wvndrkmmer" (Small Doses Records), and a 12" containing remixes by Lustmord, and Ulver (Hydra Head Records).

=== Sailors With Wax Wings and White Moth ===
In 2010, Balling founded two more bands, again recording as R. Loren: Sailors With Wax Wings, and White Moth. These bands were large scale collaborations curated by Balling, who also performed lead vocals on both records.

Sailors With Wax Wings is a collaboration between Balling and notable artists Simon Scott (Slowdive), James Blackshaw, Vern Rumsey (Unwound), Jonas Renkse (Katatonia), Dominick Fernow (as Prurient), Aaron Stainthorpe (My Dying Bride), Colin Marston (Krallice), Aidan Baker (Nadja), Ted Parsons (Godflesh, Swans, Prong), Hildur Gudnadottir, Jessica McWhirter, and Marissa Nadler, with cover art by David Tibet (Current 93), and Faith Coloccia (Mamiffer). All lyrics on the album come from the poetry of Stephen Crane, who Balling says appeared to him in a vision.

White Moth is a collaboration between Balling and notable artists Lydia Lunch, Alec Empire (Atari Teenage Riot), Shelby Cinca (Frodus), John Gossard (Weakling, Dispirit), Sam Hillmer (Zs), Dälek, Colin Marston (Krallice), Ashley Scott Jones (Treasure Fingers), Jacob Kirkegaard, Christoph Heemann, and Charlene Rogers, with album art by Chet W. Scott (Blood of the Black Owl).

Both albums were released on Angel Oven Records.

=== Handmade Birds records ===
In February 2011, Balling started a boutique record label called Handmade Birds. The label began live with the release of the LP "When California Falls Into The Sea" by Evan Caminiti (Barn Owl), and a reissue of Blut Aus Nord's dark opus "Mort".

Balling was quoted saying the label was a way for him to "collaborate with artists that I love, acting as a vehicle for that energy, whilst fostering a level of appreciation for art and music in my household that I feel will be healthy for my two daughters to grow up around."

Within the first year, Handmade Birds put out almost 40 releases. In May 2012, the label released the debut album of Texas natives Pinkish Black, and has released albums from artists as diverse as Lycia, Merzbow, His Name Is Alive, Circle of Ouroborus, Prurient, White Ring and Locrian.

== Discography ==
=== Rx Bandits ===
- Demo(nstration) (1996)
- Those Damn Bandits (1997)
- Halfway Between Here and There (1999)
- Slow Gherkin/Rx Bandits (1999) – with Slow Gherkin
- Progress (2001)

=== The Sound of Animals Fighting ===
- Tiger and the Duke (2005)
- Lover, the Lord Has Left Us... (2006)
- Tiger and the Duke: Reissue (2007)
- We Must Become the Change We Want to See (2007)
- The Ocean and the Sun (2008)
- Apeshit (2022)
- Live in Philadelphia (2023)
- The Maiden (2025)

=== Pyramids ===
- Pyramids (2008)
- Pyramids with Nadja (2009) – with Nadja
- Wvndrkmmer (2010)
- Into the Silent Waves: Ulver and Lustmord Remixes (2010) – with Nadja
- A Throne Without A King (2011) – with Horseback
- Pyramids Remixes (2011)
- Mamiffer / Pyramids (2012) – with Mamiffer
- Magpie & Raven (2012) – with Wraiths
- A Northern Meadow (2015)
- Pythagoras (2025)

=== Other Projects ===
- Sailors with Wax Wings – Sailors with Wax Wings (2010)
- White Moth – White Moth (2010)
- Hospital Gown - Diamond Life 2 (2022)
