= Mutoid Man =

American band

- Origin: Brooklyn, New York, U.S.
- Genres: Hardcore punk; heavy metal; progressive metal; psychedelic rock; speed metal; rock and roll
- Years active: 2012–present
- Labels: Magic Bullet; Sargent House
- Spinoff of: Cave In; Converge
- Members: Stephen Brodsky; Ben Koller; Jeff Matz
- Past members: Nick Cageao
- Website: mutoidman.com

Mutoid Man is an American heavy metal band formed in 2012 in Brooklyn, New York City by Cave In vocalist/guitarist Stephen Brodsky, Converge drummer Ben Koller and bassist Nick Cageao (with High on Fire bassist Jeff Matz replacing Cageao in 2021). They have released two EPs and three studio albums to date. AllMusic described their sound as metalcore but noted that it engages not just with hardcore punk and heavy metal but also rock and roll, math rock, progressive rock, and psychedelic music. Pitchfork celebrated their debut album Bleeder for "[embracing] both numbskull hard rock and cerebral progressive metal, at a time when the two approaches have become almost mutually exclusive in heavy music."

== History ==
Koller recorded some songs as a two-piece band with Stephen Brodsky of Cave In in mid-2012 under the name Mutoid Man. The project was properly announced in March 2013, and its debut EP, Helium Head, was released in November 2013 through Magic Bullet Records. Describing the sound of the new project, Brodsky said, "The material picks up from where we left off with the Cave In "Shapeshifter"/"Dead Already" cassingle, written with Ben in the band. The two of us ran with that sound and formula and took it as far as we could go."

Koller and Brodsky were later joined by bassist Nick Cageao to form a three-piece band, and released their first full-length album Bleeder on June 30, 2015, through Sargent House. The band released their second full-length album, War Moans, in June 2017. They are also the house band for Two Minutes to Late Night, a heavy metal-themed talk show. In August of 2021, Jeff Matz of High On Fire and Zeke joined the band, replacing Cageao on bass.

== Members ==
Current members

- Stephen Brodsky – guitar, vocals (2012–present)
- Ben Koller – drums (2012–present)
- Jeff Matz – bass (2021–present)

Former members

- Nick Cageao – bass (2013–2021)

Timeline

== Discography ==
Studio albums

- Bleeder (2015)
- War Moans (2017)
- Mutants (2023)

EPs

- Helium Head (2013)
- Covers EP (2018)

Demos

- Kiss of Death (Demo) (2020)
- Bandages (Demo) (2020)
- War Moans – St. Vitus Demos 2016 (2021)
