= Split: Facing New York/Amity =

EP by Facing New York and Amity
- Released: August 31, 2004
- Genre: Indie rock
- Length: 25:59
- Label: Top Notch Records

Facing New York and Amity chronology
Swimming Not Treading (EP) (2004)	Split: Facing New York/Amity (2004)	Full Turn (single) (2005)

Professional ratings
Review scores
Source	Rating
SmartPunk	5/5 stars

Split: Facing New York/Amity is a 2004 split/EP release by San Francisco group Facing New York and the Los Angeles based Amity.

== Track listing ==
1. "Paper Shepherd"– 3:56 (Facing New York)
2. "With a Grain of Salt"– 3:57 (Amity)
3. "Today (It Ends)"– 4:26 (Facing New York)
4. "This Song Is Low Carb"– 2:51 (Amity)
5. "Roman Son"– 6:47 (Facing New York)
6. "Mondee Le Sauve" - 4:02 (Amity)
