= Gemini, Her Majesty =

Album by Rx Bandits

Studio album by Rx Bandits
- Released: July 22, 2014
- Recorded: April 2014 at Prairie Sun Recording Studios, Sonoma County (CA).
- Genre: Progressive rock
- Length: 43:31
- Label: MDB Records
- Producer: Jason Cupp

Rx Bandits chronology
Mandala (2009)	Gemini, Her Majesty (2014)

Professional ratings
Aggregate scores
Source	Rating
Metacritic	73/100
Review scores
Source	Rating
AllMusic	3.5/5 stars
Consequence	C+
Alternative Press	4/5 stars

Gemini, Her Majesty is the 7th studio album released by the Rx Bandits released on July 22, 2014 through MDB Records. The album was preceded by two singles, "Stargazer" and "Meow! Meow! Space Tiger". For this record, the band were less concerned about replicating their on-stage sound, as guitarist Steve Choi explained: "The main difference is that this time around, we didn't write with being live in mind". This album peaked #39 on the Billboard 200, but was only on chart for a week.

== Track listing ==
All tracks are written by Steve Choi and Matt Embree.

No.	Title	Length
1.	"Intro"	1:14
2.	"Ruby Cumulous"	4:51
3.	"Wide Open"	2:29
4.	"Stargazer"	3:33
5.	"Fire to the Ocean"	4:09
6.	"G2G"	5:46
7.	"Will You Be Tomorrow"	5:58
8.	"Meow! Meow! Space Tiger"	3:45
9.	"1995"	3:28
10.	"Penguin Marlin Brando"	3:45
11.	"Future, Buddy"	4:33
