= Pyramids (album) =

Studio album by Pyramids
- Released: April 22, 2008
- Genre: Experimental, post-rock
- Length: 31:30 (Disc 1); 42:54 (Disc 2)
- Label: Hydra Head Records (CD) (HH666-154)

Pyramids chronology
Pyramids (2008)	Pyramids with Nadja (2009)

Professional ratings
Review scores
Source	Rating
Drowned in Sound	9/10 stars
Metal Storm	(8.8/10)
Pitchfork Media	(6.5/10)
PopMatters	8/10 stars
Tiny Mix Tapes	4/5 stars

Pyramids is the debut studio album by American post-rock band Pyramids. The album features a second disc of remixes, with contributions from artists such as Jesu and James Plotkin.

== Track listing ==
=== Disc 1 ===
No.	Title	Length
1.	"Sleds"	3:10
2.	"Igloo"	3:17
3.	"The Echo of Something Lovely"	3:20
4.	"End Resolve"	3:42
5.	"Hellmonk"	3:14
6.	"This House Is Like Any Other World"	3:01
7.	"Hillary"	3:15
8.	"Ghost"	3:27
9.	"Monks"	2:29
10.	"1, 2, 3"	2:35
Total length:		31:30

=== Disc 2 - Remixes ===
No.	Title	Length
1.	"The Echo of Something Lovely [Toby Driver/Ted Parsons/Colin Marston]"	5:30
2.	"1, 2, 3 [James Plotkin]"	4:27
3.	"The Echo of Something Lovely [Jesu]"	6:13
4.	"Sleds [loveliescrushing]"	3:35
5.	"Ghost [Birchville Cat Motel]"	9:52
6.	"Sleds [Blut Aus Nord]"	3:28
7.	"The Echo of Something Lovely [James Plotkin]"	3:12
8.	"Sleds [Alt. Mix, Ted Scarlett]"	3:11
9.	"The Echo of Something Lovely [lovesliescrushing]"	3:26
Total length:		42:54
