= Nurses (band) =

- Origin: Portland, Oregon and Idaho Falls, Idaho, United States
- Genres: psychedelic funk, experimental ragtime, psychedelic folk
- Labels: Sargent House; Dead Oceans

Nurses is an American, Portland-based avant-pop group with vocals, guitar, and keyboard. Their sound is often categorized as psychedelic pop The duo joined Dead Oceans Records on May 21, 2009, and released two albums via Dead Oceans, with Apple's Acre being issued on August 4, 2009 (August 24 in the UK). They have been described as a shaggy younger sibling of Animal Collective singing with the sound of dreamy harmonies, carnival organs, slightly out-of-tune pianos and basic percussion from a lone snare or tambourine and received a 7.2 rating from Pitchfork. Dracula was released on September 20, 2011.

Nurses toured with the Swedish folk musician The Tallest Man on Earth in 2010, and Stephen Malkmus and the Jicks in February 2012

A$AP Rocky and members of A$AP Mob freestyled over Nurses' track "You Lookin' Twice" for Pitchfork's Selector in December 2011.

"Yours to Keep" was the closing track from Naughtland, their latest album, which was released in 2017.

== Discography ==
- Hangin' Nothin' but Our Hands Down (Sargent House; 2007)
- Apple's Acre (Dead Oceans; 2009)
- Dracula (Dead Oceans; 2011)
- Naughtland (2017)
