= Mutants (Mutoid Man album) =

Studio album by Mutoid Man
- Released: July 28, 2023
- Recorded: January–February 2022
- Studio: GodCity, Salem, Massachusetts
- Genre: Progressive rock, psychedelic rock, punk rock, hardcore punk, heavy metal
- Length: 38:06
- Label: Sargent House
- Producer: Kurt Ballou

Mutoid Man chronology
War Moans (2017)	Mutants (2023)

Professional ratings
Review scores
Source	Rating
Kerrang!	4/5
Metal Injection	7.5/10
MetalSucks	4.5/5 stars
New Noise Magazine	5/5 stars

Mutants is the third studio album by American rock band Mutoid Man, released on July 28, 2023, through Sargent House.

== Track listing ==
All songs written by Mutoid Man. "Siren Song" co-written by Nick Cageao. Additional lyrics to "Unborn" and "Memory Hole" by Kurt Ballou.

Mutants track listing
No.	Title	Length
1.	"Call of the Void"	3:59
2.	"Frozen Hearts"	2:57
3.	"Broken Glass Ceiling"	4:12
4.	"Siren Song"	3:38
5.	"Graveyard Love"	3:01
6.	"Unborn"	4:44
7.	"Siphon"	3:03
8.	"Demons"	2:47
9.	"Memory Hole"	4:02
10.	"Setting Sun"	5:44
Total length:		38:06

== Personnel ==
Mutoid Man

- Stephen Brodsky – vocals, guitar
- Ben Koller – drums, percussion
- Jeff Matz – bass, vocals, piano

Additional musicians

- Nate Newton – guest vocals
- Aaron Turner – guest vocals

Production

- Kurt Ballou – production, engineering, mixing
- Zach Wells – engineering assistance
- Alan Douches – mastering at West West Side Music
- John Santos Illustration – artwork and layout
