= Progress (Rx Bandits album) =

Studio album by Rx Bandits
- Released: July 17, 2001
- Recorded: Standard Electrical Recorders (Venice, California), Larchmont Studios (Hancock Park, California)
- Genre: Ska punk
- Length: 52:43
- Label: Drive-Thru
- Producer: Chris Fudurich

Rx Bandits chronology
Halfway Between Here and There (1999)	Progress (2001)	The Resignation (2003)

Professional ratings
Review scores
Source	Rating
Allmusic	3/5 stars
Ox-Fanzine	6/10

Progress is an album released by Rx Bandits on July 17, 2001 through Drive-Thru Records.

The LP was originally titled Artificial Intelligence and the Fall of Technology. The album was recorded during a tumultuous time in the band's lineup. Several members had left the band after the recording of Halfway between Here and There, though former saxophonist Noah Gaffney contributed on the song "Anyone But You." Gaffney's position was eventually filled by saxophonist Steve Borth, formerly of East Bay ska-punk band Link 80.

After the departure of James Salamone on bass, the band had many temporary replacements, including Johnny Tsagakis, drummer Chris Tsagakis' younger brother. Joe Troy, a longtime friend of Embree who helped write the song "What If?", eventually joined the band as a permanent bass player.

Steve Choi, formerly of The Chinkees, also became a full member playing guitar and keyboards. Choi had also played keyboards on the demos that the band made for Progress, but when it came time to record, they decided to have Rich Zahniser of The Hippos play on the album, because at the time he was touring with the band. Former Jeffries Fan Club trombonist Chris Colonnier also played with the band at times in the same role as Zahniser. Progress was ranked #207 on the greatest albums in 2001.

Shortly after the release of Progress, Chris Sheets joined as a second trombone player. Not long after that, Rich Balling quit the band.

The album spawned the band's first music video for the song "Analog Boy." The band wouldn't make a second music video for another 5 years, until the title track of 2006's ...And the Battle Begun.

== Track listing ==
All songs written by Matt Embree, except where noted.

1. " – 0:28" – 0:28
2. "VCG³" (Rich Balling) – 3:44
3. "Consequential Apathy" – 2:36
4. "Analog Boy" – 4:13
5. "Get" – 2:42
6. "All the Time" – 3:55
7. "In All Rwanda's Glory" – 3:35
8. "Babylon" – 3:20
9. "Who Would've Thought" – 3:15
10. "Status" – 3:28
11. "Anyone But You" (Rich Balling) – 3:03
12. "Nugget" – 4:59
13. "Progress" – 3:28
14. "Nothing Sacred" – 2:58
15. "Infection" – 6:53

== Personnel ==
- Rich Balling – trombone, vocals
- Matt Embree – vocals, guitar
- James Salomone – bass
- Chris Tsagakis – drums

=== Additional musicians ===
- Kate Carter – violin, viola
- Alan Elliot – clavinet
- Christopher Fudurich – aural chaos
- Noah Gaffney – saxophone
- Brad Lindsay – cello
- David Vokoun – double bass
- Rich Zahniser – Hammond B3, trombone
