= Gardening, Not Architecture =

American independent music and performance art project

Sarah Saturday (Gardening, Not Architecture)
- Genres: Indie rock, indietronica, indie pop, electropop
- Years active: 2007-Present
- Members: Sarah Saturday
- Website: sarahsaturday.com

Gardening, Not Architecture is an American independent music and performance art project created by Sarah Saturday and based in Nashville, Tennessee.

== History ==
=== Formation (2003-2004) ===
Saturday recorded original demos on a karaoke tape cassette machine that would become songs on 'First EP' before relocating to Los Angeles after the break-up of her pop-punk band, Saving Face. Demos were recorded in producer Beau Sorenson's apartment in Madison, Wisconsin, but never released.

=== First EP (2007-2009) ===
Saturday returned to Madison in 2007 to begin recording four songs for the 'First EP' with producer/engineer Beau Sorenson at Smart Studios. The EP was released in the fall of 2007 and included four songs: 'If You Only Knew', 'Jabberwocky', 'Nevermind', and 'The Great Unraveling'. In 2008, Saturday performed the first-ever Gardening, Not Architecture shows in Los Angeles as a three-piece band. On March 10, 2009, Gardening, Not Architecture's first-ever tour launched in North Hollywood, CA, featuring Saturday on bass with a laptop playing backing tracks and controlling a synchronized homemade LED "light wall" built by Saturday and Wyatt Glodell. The three-week tour was sponsored by Macbeth Footwear and included shows in Santa Barbara, Sacramento, Portland, Seattle, Salt Lake City and beyond. On April 3, 2009, Saturday released the official music video for 'If You Only Knew' directed by Evan Glodell.

=== First LP (2009-2010) ===
In the summer of 2009, Saturday began recording the first full-length album with producer Beau Sorenson at Albert Court Studios in Portland, OR. The 'First LP' was released on September 8, 2009. On September 9, 2009, Gardening, Not Architecture launched a six-week U.S. tour alongside Gavin Castleton. On September 28, 2009, the official music video for 'Stop, I Get It', directed by Chris Laughter, was released. In 2010, Gardening, Not Architecture joined Canadian pop band Crazy Diamond for a two-week tour of eastern Canada before taking part in the entire Vans Warped Tour for shows from June 24 through August 15. A U.S. fall tour from October 1 through November 27 then followed, including performances at Indie Week in Toronto, CMJ Music Festival in New York City, and the Halifax Pop Explosion Festival.

=== Saboteur (2011) ===
In 2011, Saturday moved from Los Angeles to Seattle and began writing songs for a second full-length album while launching a Kickstarter campaign to fund the recording. 'Saboteur' was fully-funded on Kickstarter and recorded with producer Steve Choi and engineer Roger Leo Camero and released on November 22, 2011. A fall tour with Chris Staples followed the release from November 25 - December 10. The album's closing song, 'Far & Wide', was placed in the season three finale of Parenthood.

=== The Florida Sessions & Touring (2012) ===
In 2012, Saturday released a series of demos recorded during a period of self-imposed isolation in Northwest Florida over the course of two weeks called 'The Florida Sessions', released for free online via Bandcamp. The songs in this collection would later become some of her most-synced in film and television. That same year, Saturday relocated to East Nashville, Tennessee. In October 2012, Saturday joined Portland-based noise music artist Yardsss on a two-week east coast tour. For this tour, Saturday built a new light show using fluorescent lights and a midi-to-DMX controller to synchronize the music to the lights.

=== Fossils Album & Film (2013-2016) ===
Saturday began writing songs for a third full-length album in 2013, along with assembling a new live band with Bryan Feece on drums and Jackson Parsons on guitar. In October 2014, Saturday began recording at Big Light Studios in Nashville with engineer-mixer Logan Matheny. The album was completed on May 24, 2015, and released on July 10, 2015.

For the release of her third album, Saturday sought a unique approach, opting for a feature-length film representation of the album. In search of collaborators, she reached out to the Nashville filmmaking community via a listserv post. Recommendations led her to director Dycee Wildman, and together with Jonathan Rogers and Motke Dapp, they divided the album into three parts for an anthology film, each with its own director and treatment.

Filming for the Fossils feature film began on April 25, 2015. The film's three parts, directed by Dapp, Rogers, and Wildman, have distinct storylines connected by central themes and imagery such as water, yellow flowers, clouds, and dance movements choreographed by Rachel Tolbert. Nashville artist L.A. Bachman's Cloud series, commissioned for the film, was exhibited at The Rymer Gallery as part of the Fossils Fundraiser Gala in June 2015.

Fossils premiered in East Nashville on July 11, 2015, at The Crying Wolf as part of the album release party. The three parts of the film include: A Delicate Decay: Revolves around a girl reflecting on a past relationship, partly filmed overseas in Iceland and France; Of Imprints: Contrasts masculine and feminine themes with small cameos by Sarah Saturday and band members; And What Remains: A traditional narrative about a couple drifting apart. The release of the film also included a dance interpretation of the album by local troupe Numinous Flux, streamed on YouTube in 2015. The online premiere of the Fossils film took place in July 2016, followed by additional screenings.

=== Installation & Live Film Scoring (2016) ===
"Fossils: A 360 Audio/Visual Experience" on June 4, 2016, at abrasiveMedia art gallery featured the film's three parts, the album playing in wireless headphones, and L.A. Bachman's Clouds painting series. Gardening, Not Architecture performed "Fossils Film: Live" on November 11–12, 2016, at the Modular Art Pods show at Queen Ave Arts Collective in East Nashville. For this performance, Saturday's five-piece band donned white jumpsuits and played the Fossils soundtrack live while the film was projected onto their backs and inside a floor-to-ceiling cube made of white pipe and drape.

=== Film Scoring (2016-2018) ===
After the release of Fossils, Saturday began focusing on film scoring after having several of Gardening, Not Architecture's songs placed in TV, film, and commercials. Her most notable film scoring credits during this period are the entire original motion picture soundtrack for Superpowerless and several cues for the TV movie "Dark Side of the Sun" on the Discovery Channel. During this time, Saturday took a hiatus from performing live and writing for Gardening, Not Architecture.

=== Absence of Me Single & Live Show (2019) ===
On April 28, 2019, Gardening, Not Architecture released a new single, produced by Eric Hillman of Foreign Fields, entitled Absence of Me. A few days after the release, Saturday premiered a music video for the single, directed and edited by Dycee Wildman and filmed by Caleb Dirks. On May 18, 2019, Saturday revealed a new solo live performance piece at the single release show for Absence of Me, which took place at The Cobra in East Nashville. Returning to her roots as a solo performer, Saturday's new show featured a homemade backdrop that served as a projection screen with synchronized LED lights inside, and accompanying videos created by collaborator Dycee Wildman that were projected onto Saturday in a white jumpsuit. For the show, Saturday played only a bass and used a laptop for backing tracks, a throwback to the original Gardening, Not Architecture touring setup from 2007–2012. The performance was 22 minutes long and included sampled meditation clips, remixed original Gardening, Not Architecture songs, and the premiere of the new single and music video. In the fall of 2019, Saturday was invited to perform Absence of Me at the second annual Kindling Arts Festival, an up-and-coming performance art festival in Nashville that featured dance, theatre, spoken word, and unique and avant-garde performances.

=== Voyage: A Live Visual Album (2020 - Present) ===
In 2020, Sarah hosted her first-ever residency in partnership with Mindful Nashville, composed the score for two short films, and was invited to perform as part of a streaming event at Oz Arts Nashville. In 2021, Sarah began recording her fourth studio album, produced by her brother, John Paul Roney of Boom Forest. Her only live show in 2021 was a reimagined version of her "Absence of Me" performance piece for the 2021 Kindling Arts Festival.

Sarah started 2022 with a two-night performance in the Portals group show at Oz Arts Nashville, before beginning production on her new full-scale theatrical performance piece, Voyage, with long-timer collaborator Dycee Wildman. Her most technical and complex live show to-date, Voyage was built around nine short films co-written by Saturday and Wildman and directed by Wildman. Saturday was invited as one of four artists to share work-in-progress excerpts from Voyage in the Brave New Works Lab, a three-night group show at Oz Arts Nashville in May 2022. The performance and new music received rave reviews, and Saturday began releasing singles from the forthcoming album in late 2022.

In January 2023, Sarah was invited to be the artist in residence for one month at Coop Gallery in Nashville. During this time, she showed behind-the-scenes photos, props, and costumes from the making of Voyage. Saturday also created several pieces of original mixed-media artwork using images and lyrics from the show. She performed the nearly-finished full performance of Voyage eleven times for private audiences and was met with overwhelmingly positive responses.

In June 2023, Saturday was awarded the Tennessee Arts Commission Individual Artist Fellowship for fiscal year 2024. On August 3, 2023, Sarah premiered Voyage: A Live Visual Album at the Darkhorse Theatre in Nashville, TN, with a three-night run. The accompanying soundtrack album was released on all streaming platforms on August 3, 2023.

== In popular culture ==
Gardening, Not Architecture songs have been used in the television shows Parenthood and Jane By Design, indie film Mutual Friends and in online advertisements for Patagonia. Sarah Saturday wrote and produced the original motion picture score for the indie film Superpowerless in 2016, and co-wrote and co-produced music with Eric Hillman for the TV movie Dark Side of the Sun on Discovery Channel in 2017.

== Collaborators ==
- Beau Sorenson – production, engineering (2004-2009)
- Hunter Burgan – drums (2008)
- Steve Choi – production, engineering (2011)
- Bryan Feece – drums (2012–2016)
- Jackson Parsons – guitar (2013–2016)
- Josh Cropper – bass (2015–2016)
- Larry Duren – keyboards (2015–2016)
- Eric Hillman - production, engineering (2017-2019)
- Boom Forest - production, engineering (2021-2023)
- Jeremy Lister - vocal production, (2022–present)
- Logan Matheny – mixing (2014–present)
- Dycee Wildman - videography (2014–present)

== Discography ==
- First EP (2007)
- First LP (2009)
- Saboteur (2011)
- The Florida Sessions (Demos) (2012)
- Fossils (2015)
- Superpowerless (Original Motion Picture Score) (2016)
- Absence of Me (Single) (2019)
- Voyage (2023)
