= The Autumns (album) =

Studio album by The Autumns
- Released: 2004
- Recorded: 2004
- Genre: Alternative rock Indie rock Dream pop Shoegazing
- Length: 50:42
- Label: Pseudopod Records (US), Bella Union (UK)
- Producer: Jamie Seyberth; Ben Eshbach (co-producer on "Cattleya")

The Autumns chronology
Gift EP (2003)	The Autumns (2004)	Fake Noise from a Box of Toys (2007)

Bella Union (UK) cover art

Professional ratings
Review scores
Source	Rating
AllMusic	4.5/5 stars
Uncut	3/5 stars
Stylus Magazine	(C) link
Opus.fm	(not rated)
Grave Concerns	(not rated)

The Autumns is the third studio album by the indie rock band The Autumns. It was released in 2004 on Pseudopod Records. The release was long-awaited, as the recording process was lengthy. In the meantime, bassist Brian Stearns exited the band, and was replaced by Dustin Morgan. An additional guitarist, Ken Tighe, was added to the lineup.

== Track listing ==
All songs by The Autumns.

1. "The End"
2. "Hush, Plain Girls"
3. "Deathly Little Dreams"
4. "Desole"
5. "Flies in the Eyes of the Queen"
6. "Every Sunday Sky"
7. "Slumberdoll"
8. "Edmond & Edward"
9. "Wish Stars"
10. "The Moon Softly Weeps a Lullabye"
11. "Cattleya"
12. "Wonderfully Wonderful"
13. "Heartsick on the Open Sea"
