= Winter in a Silver Box =

EP by The Autumns
- Released: 1998
- Genre: Alternative rock
- Label: Risk

The Autumns chronology
The Angel Pool (1997)	Winter in a Silver Box (1998)	In the Russet Gold of This Vain Hour (2000)

Winter in a Silver Box is an EP by the American alternative rock band The Autumns. It was recorded between the spring of 1997 and 1998 in "the Green Room" in Huntington Beach, California, and was released later in 1998. It had a limited pressing of 1,000 copies, and has been long out of print.

== Credits ==
- Design, Art Direction – Eric Hammer, The Autumns
- Performer, Written by – The Autumns
- Producer, Engineer – Andrew D. Prickett

== Track listing ==
1. "The Angel Pool" (remix)
2. "Tears and the Sun"
3. "Pale Trembles a Gale" (remix)
4. "Winter in a Silver Box"
