= The Angel Pool =

Studio album by The Autumns
- Released: 1997
- Recorded: ???
- Genre: Alternative rock
- Length: 47:59
- Label: Risk Records
- Producer: Andrew D. Prickett

The Autumns chronology
Suicide at Strell Park EP (1997)	The Angel Pool (1997)	Winter in a Silver Box EP (1998)

Professional ratings
Review scores
Source	Rating
Allmusic	4/5 stars

The Angel Pool is the first studio album by the rock band The Autumns. It was released in 1997 on Risk Records.

== Track listing ==
1. "The Garden Ends"
2. "Embracing Winter"
3. "Sunblush"
4. "Juniper Hill"
5. "Relinquished"
6. "Eskimo Swin"
7. "The Angel Pool"
8. "Nightswimming in the Deep End"
9. "Glass in Lullabies"
