= Facing New York =

Californian rock band

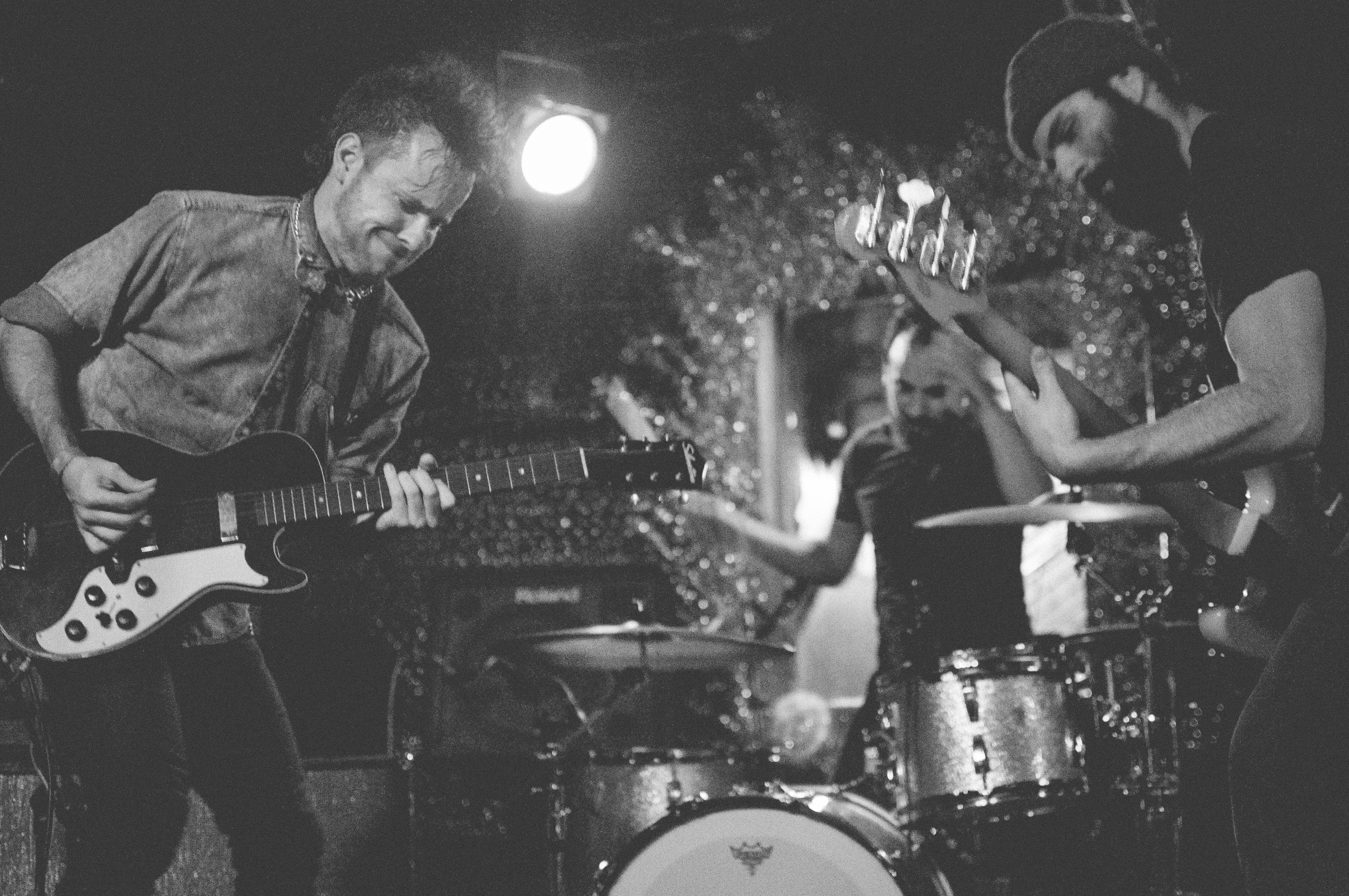

Background information
- Origin: San Francisco, California, United States
- Genres: Progressive rock, indie rock
- Years active: 2004–present
- Labels: Nice Life Recording Company, Five One, Inc.
- Members: Omar Cuellar; Eric Frederic; Brandon Canchola
- Past members: Rene Carranza; Matthew Fazzi

Facing New York is a three-piece progressive indie rock band from the Bay Area, California, formed in January 2004. The band is signed to Nice Life Recording Company and has released three full-length albums.

== History ==
The original five members formed from other bands from the Bay Area scene, with Omar Cuellar and Matt Fazzi previously playing together in Tragedy Andy and Eric Frederic and Rene Carranza in Locale A.M. Bass player Brandon Canchola was added to complete the line up. In early 2004, the group participated in the Vans Warped Tour 2004 on select dates. They sold their self-released EP, Swimming Not Treading to customers queuing to get into the shows, and it was successful enough to get the band signed to Five One, Inc.

They went on a US West Coast tour with Rx Bandits and Steel Train, and then a tour with Somerset in May 2005. The band's self-titled album was released on August 30, 2005, which was preceded with a month-long US tour.

In March 2006, the band undertook a tour with fellow label mates Eastern Youth, and then with Taking Back Sunday in the Western United States in April of the same year. The tour then lead them traveling as far as Japan, in early June 2006, to do a series of shows again with Eastern Youth and the Japanese indie rock group, Toe.

In July 2006, Carranza stated he would be leaving the band to go back to school. Following this, they supported Coheed and Cambria at a handful of shows. Carranza played his last show on September 1 in San Francisco, and the remaining members finished off the remainder of 2006 with a headlining tour throughout the US, with friend and label mate Gavin Castleton filling in.

In March 2007, the band participated in the South by Southwest music festival and wrote new material which they performed at the festival. In June and July 2007, the band went on a US tour with Tera Melos and By the End of Tonight. They toured Europe with Rx Bandits in September and October 2007.

Fazzi played his final show with the band on April 19, 2008, at San Francisco's Bottom of the Hill. The encore featured Carranza back again on keyboards for a dramatic finale. It was revealed on May 8 that Fazzi had joined Taking Back Sunday, after the departure of Fred Mascherino. In July 2008, the band supported Rx Bandits and Portugal. The Man on their co-headlining US tour.

Preceded by "Cops on Bike" and "Comin' Up", the band released their second album, Get Hot, on October 14, 2008. The album received a B+ rating from The A.V. Club, with reviewer Chris Martins calling the album "worth discovering...a sturdy work that's artful as well as entertaining". On March 2, 2009, Canchola left the band, resulting in the cancellation of a UK tour.

The band has cited Pixies, The Jesus Lizard, and Yes to Talk Talk, Failure and Shudder to Think among their influences. They were described by Allmusic as "a second-generation emo band with some progressive and post-rock tendencies". The LA Weekly described the band: "There's some prog-rock here, a little Steely Dan sophistication, and a whole lot of Parliament-Funkadelic's surrealistic whimsy, filtered through the band's non-genre-specific rambling."

Frederic also performs solo as Ricky Reed and Wallpaper.

In November 2018, the band announced via Instagram that their third full-length album, entitled "Dogtown," would be released December 14.

== Members ==
- Eric Frederic – vocals/guitar/keyboard (2004–present)
- Omar Cuellar – drums (2004–present)
- Brandon Canchola – bass/vocals (2004–present)

=== Past members ===
- Matthew Fazzi – guitar/vocals/keyboard/drums (2004–2008)
- Rene Carranza – keyboard (2004–2006)

== Discography ==
=== Albums ===
- Facing New York (2005), Five One, Inc.
- Get Hot (2008), Five One, Inc.
- Dogtown (2018), Nice Life Recording Company

=== Singles/EPs ===
- Swimming Not Treading (EP) (2004)
- Split: Facing New York/Amity (2004)
- "Full Turn" (single) (2005), Five One, Inc.
- "North/South" (2006), Springman (split 7-inch with The Jade Shader, The Rum Diary, Years around the Sun)
- "The Messenger" (single) (2007), Five One, Inc.
- FNY Live 4.19.08 (2008)
- "Cops On Bikes" (2008), Five One, Inc.
- "Cops On Bikes Remix" (2009), Five One, Inc.
