= The Autumns =

American indie rock band

- Origin: Los Angeles, California, United States
- Genres: Indie rock Dream pop Shoegaze
- Years active: 1997–2008
- Label: Bella Union
- Past members: Matthew Kelly; Frankie Koroshec; Madison Megna; Dustin Morgan; Steve Elkins; Jon Santana; Eric Crissman; Brian Stearns; Ken Tighe

The Autumns were an American indie rock band based in Los Angeles, California, comprising Matthew Kelly (vocals, guitar), Frankie Koroshec (guitar), Dustin Morgan (bass) and Steve Elkins (drums).

== History ==
Formed by childhood friends Koroshec and Kelly, the band was signed to Risk Records in 1997 and released an EP, Suicide at Strell Park, and the album The Angel Pool, the same year.

The Angel Pool brought the band to the attention of the Cocteau Twins' Simon Raymonde and they decamped to London to record their second album In the Russet Gold of This Vain Hour with Raymonde at the controls.

...Russet Gold looked set to break the band to a wider audience, drawing interest from MTV and influential Los Angeles based radio station KROQ, but shortly after its release, Risk Records collapsed and the band found themselves without a label.

This was not a situation that bothered the group much (indeed Koroshec later stated, "It was for the best. That level of attention made us uncomfortable. And it wasn't the record to blow up. We were still searching and experimenting"). In the following years The Autumns released a four-song recording of 1950s inspired love songs on pink vinyl (Le Carillon) and the covers EP Covers and also scored the film Searching for Angela Shelton, revelling in the artistic freedom that being unsigned provided.

The band released their self-titled third album in 2004 on Pseudopod Records in America and Bella Union in the UK. The album was lauded extensively in the European press, receiving four-star reviews in The Times, MOJO, and 8/10 in NME. The band's fourth album, Fake Noise From a Box of Toys, was released by Bella Union in 2007.

Lead singer Matthew Kelly also had guest vocals and guitar for The Sound of Animals Fighting and contributed to 2006's Lover, the Lord Has Left Us... and 2008's The Ocean and The Sun. Kelly and Koroshec contributed lyrics to the first volume of the Warner Books compendium, Revolution on Canvas. Kelly and Elkins contributed short stories to Revolution on Canvas 2.

The Autumns disbanded quietly in 2008. The official website remained online until April 2013. In 2014, Matthew Kelly confirmed the end, stating they are done with that part of their lives but remain friends.

== Members ==
- Matthew Kelly (vocals/guitar)
- Frankie Koroshec (lead guitar)
- Steve Elkins (drums, 1999-2008)
- Dustin Morgan (bass, 2001-2008)
- Ken Tighe (guitar, 2001-2006)
- Brian Stearns (bass/vocals, 1998-2001)
- Eric Crissman (drums, 1992-1999)
- Jon Santana (bass, 1992-1998)
- Madison Megna (guitar, 2006-2008)

== Discography ==
=== Albums ===
- The Angel Pool (1997)
- In the Russet Gold of This Vain Hour (2000)
- The Autumns (2004)
- Fake Noise from a Box of Toys (2007)

=== EPs ===
- Suicide at Strell Park (1997)
- Winter in a Silver Box (1998)
- Le Carillon (EP) (2001)
- Covers (2001)
- Gift (2003)

=== Singles ===
- "Boy With the Aluminum Stilts" (1999)
- Split with Lift to Experience (2000)
- "Every Sunday Sky" (2004)
- "Boys" (2007)
