= ...And the Battle Begun =

Studio album by Rx Bandits
- Released: October 10, 2006
- Recorded: 2005–2006
- Genre: Alternative rock; post-hardcore; experimental rock
- Length: 50:32
- Label: Mash Down Babylon
- Producer: Rx Bandits

Rx Bandits chronology
The Resignation (2003)	...And the Battle Begun (2006)	Mandala (2009)

Professional ratings
Review scores
Source	Rating
AbsolutePunk.net	(79%)
Punknews.org	3.5/5 stars

...And the Battle Begun is an album by the Rx Bandits. It is the band's first album released by Matt Embree's label Mash Down Babylon. The album was released in stores on October 10, 2006, but was first made available in late June both directly from the band whilst on their 2006 summer tour and online via their website.

== Background and recording ==
Rx Bandits served as the backing band of the Bruce Lee Band for a series of shows in March 2005. They went on a US West Coast tour with Steel Train, Before Braille and Facing New York. The band recorded their next album in May 2005.

Like The Resignation, the rhythm section was recorded live for ...And The Battle Begun. Overdubs were done in various studios, one of which was Embree's.

== Release ==
They supported Finch in July and August 2005. In September and October 2005, they toured across California with Mike Park and Dan Potthast. On March 23, 2006, "Only for the Night" was made available for streaming through the band's Myspace profile. In April and May 2006, the band embarked on a tour of the UK. The album was eventually pushed back to May 2006; however, on June 5, 2006, it was announced for release in four months' time, with the intention of it appearing on Embree's label Mash Down Babylon. Three days later, "In Her Drawer" was posted on the band's PureVolume account, and the album's artwork was posted online. Following this, saxophonist player Steve Borth left the band.

Between June and August 2006, the band went on a cross-country US tour; the first portion was supported by the Exit, Men, Women & Children and Desa, the second portions had I Am the Avalanche replaced the Exit, while the last portion had I Am the Avalanche and Men Women & Children replaced by State Radio and Monty. On July 9, 2006, "1980" was posted on the band's Myspace. In September 2006, the band were actively searching for a new saxophonist or trombonist ahead of an upcoming tour. Towards the end of the month, "...And the Battle Begun" was posted on their Myspace, ahead of the album on October 10, 2006. In October and November 2006, the band went on a short tour of the US with Vaux, Days Away, and the Lawrence Arms on various dates. On December 22, 2006, they filmed a music video for "...And the Battle Begun" with director Adam Thomson; it was posted online on January 6, 2007. Between February and April 2007, the band supported Gym Class Heroes on their headlining US tour. They then went on a West Coast tour in August 2007 with support from the Fall of Troy and Maps & Atlases, and a European tour in September and October 2007 with Facing New York. The album was released on two ten-inch vinyl records on October 1, 2007. The following month, the band embarked on an East Coast tour. In February and March 2008, the band supported the Beat on their headlining tour of the US. In early 2008, the band appeared at the South by Southwest and Bamboozle Left festivals. In August 2008, the band posted acoustic versions of "1980" and "To Our Unborn Daughters" on their Myspace.

== Critical reception ==
The Sacramento News & Review wrote that the album "challenges your ears in the best way possible, with shifting time signatures, wildly varying moods and general chaotic genius. Countless experimental bands mine similar 'anything goes, so long as its good' territory, but rarely has this boundary-pushing been so refreshing."

== Track listing ==
No.	Title	Length
1.	"Untitled"	0:46
2.	"...And the Battle Begun"	4:56
3.	"In Her Drawer"	5:11
4.	"Only for the Night"	3:47
5.	"On a Lonely Screen"	2:44
6.	"1980"	3:03
7.	"One Million Miles an Hour, Fast Asleep"	2:54
8.	"Apparition"	3:39
9.	"A Mouth Full of Hollow Threats?"	3:33
10.	"Epoxi-lips"	6:04
11.	"Tainted Wheat"	3:30
12.	"To Our Unborn Daughters"	5:14
13.	"Crushing Destroyer"	5:11

== Credits ==
=== Rx Bandits ===
- Matthew Embree – vocals, guitar
- Steve Choi – guitar, keyboards
- Steven Jess Borth II – saxophone, keyboards, backing vocals
- Chris Sheets – trombone, backing vocals, percussion
- Joseph Troy – bass
- Christopher Tsagakis – drums

=== Additional Personnel ===
- Robert Cheek, Ryan Baker, David Embree – Engineer
- Louis Teran/Marcussen Mastering – Mastering
- Aaron Nagel – Album cover painting
- Lisa Huey – Photography
- Josh Mintz – Layout
