= The Siren Song of Stephen Jay Gould =

One-act play by Benjamin Bettenbender

The Siren Song of Stephen Jay Gould is a one-act play by Benjamin Bettenbender. It was performed at the Cape Cod Theatre Project at the Falmouth Academy in Falmouth, Massachusetts, and included in the anthology The Best American Short Plays 2000–2001.

== Plot ==
The play is a two-hander dark comedy featuring an unnamed man and an unnamed woman. The setting is on the bank of a river near a bridge stanchion. At the start of the play, the woman is seen walking along the bank of the river. She is about to throw an object into the river when the man falls on top of her from above. After expressing concern about the woman’s injured arm, the man confirms the woman’s suspicion that he leapt from the bridge in a suicide attempt. The woman questions the man about the reason for his suicide, confiding that she once swallowed a bottle of Ipecac (thinking it was poison) after the end of a romantic relationship. The man eventually confesses to having an intellectual crisis prompted by reading the work of evolutionary biologist Stephen Jay Gould, which the man sees as nihilistic and offering no meaning for human life. Upon further prompting, the man admits his feelings of sadness also stem from the memory of a romantic relationship ended five years prior. Empathetic, the woman reveals that the object she was going to throw in the river was the box that contained her ex-fiancé's engagement ring. Since her arm is now injured, the man throws it for her. The play ends with the couple contemplating a joint trip to New York City, under the pretext of finding a bigger bridge to leap from.

== Reception ==
Backstage.com considers the play to provide "mild comic relief", with a premise that is "offbeat and amusing", and "writing [that] is occasionally witty".
