= Fake Noise from a Box of Toys =

Studio album by The Autumns
- Released: October 8, 2007
- Genre: Alternative rock
- Length: 43:19
- Label: Bella Union
- Producer: Jamie Seyberth, Ted Scarlet

The Autumns chronology
The Autumns (2004)	Fake Noise from a Box of Toys (2007)

Professional ratings
Review scores
Source	Rating
AllMusic	3.5/5 stars

Fake Noise from a Box of Toys is the fourth and final studio album by American alternative rock band The Autumns, released in 2007.

== Track listing ==
All songs written by the Autumns.

1. "Turning Strangers into Friends and Friends into Customers"
2. "Boys"
3. "Clem"
4. "The Midnight Knock"
5. "Killer in Drag"
6. "Night Music"
7. "Only Young"
8. "Glass Jaw"
9. "Uncle Slim"
10. "Beautiful Boot"
11. "Adelaide"
12. "Oh My Heart"
