= The Ocean and the Sun =

Studio album by The Sound of Animals Fighting
- Released: September 9, 2008
- Genres: Experimental rock, progressive rock, art rock, post-hardcore, ambient
- Length: 51:40
- Label: Epitaph
- Producer: Matthew Embree

The Sound of Animals Fighting chronology
Lover, the Lord Has Left Us... (2006)	The Ocean and the Sun (2008)	Apeshit (2022)

Professional ratings
Review scores
Source	Rating
AbsolutePunk	85%
Cosmos Gaming	Favorable
Sputnikmusic	4.0/5

The Ocean and the Sun is the third album by experimental rock band The Sound of Animals Fighting. The album features only the four core members that had appeared on both the first and second albums: the Nightingale, the Walrus, the Lynx and The Skunk.

The first song, "Intro", is the Persian translation of the English poem "In the Desert" by Stephen Crane. The original (English) version of this poem is printed on the inside jacket of the album. It is also read in English on the eleventh track. The title of the final track, "On the Occasion of Wet Snow", is the title of the second section of Fyodor Dostoevsky's Notes from Underground. The second song, "The Ocean and the Sun", features a reading from the CrimethInc. book Days of War, Nights of Love. The title of the seventh track, "The Heraldic Beak of the Manufacturer's Medallion", is taken from J. G. Ballard's Crash.

The album peaked at 141 on the Billboard 200 and number 2 on the Top Heatseekers chart.

== Track listing ==
No.	Title	Lead vocal	Length
1.	"Intro"	Newsha Mohajeri (Spoken word)	0:31
2.	"The Ocean and the Sun"	Anthony Green, Lauren Coleman (Spoken word)	5:38
3.	"I, the Swan"	Rich Balling, Anthony Green (Bridge)	4:13
4.	"Another Leather Lung"	Anthony Green	5:14
5.	"Lude"	-	1:59
6.	"Cellophane"	Rich Balling	4:58
7.	"The Heraldic Beak of the Manufacturer's Medallion"	Anthony Green	5:39
8.	"Chinese New Year"	-	1:06
9.	"Uzbekistan"	Lauren Coleman	7:27
10.	"Blessings Be Yours Mister V"	Matthew Embree	6:37
11.	"Ahab"	Charlene Rogers (Spoken word)	1:00
12.	"On the Occasion of Wet Snow"	Rich Balling, Matthew Kelly, Jessica McWhirter	7:18

== Credits ==
- Rich Balling - vocals, executive producer
- Matthew Embree - guitar, bass, vocals, producer, engineer, mixer
- Christopher Tsagakis - drums
- Anthony Green - vocals
- Matthew Kelly - featured on "On the Occasion of Wet Snow"
- Adrian, Elaina, and Victoria Benson - kids
- Mark Bush - trumpet
- Lauren Coleman - vocals/spoken word
- Jessica McWhirter - vocals
- Newsha Mohajeri - Persian poem
- Charlene Rogers - spoken word on "Ahab"
- Edouard Wlodarczyk - French poem
- Wes Irving - assistant engineer
- David Embree - assistant engineer, co-production on "Uzbekistan"
- Austin Johnson - assistant engineer
- Charles Johnson-Nunez - assistant engineer
- Stephanie Villa - mastering
