= Suicide at Strell Park =

EP by The Autumns
- Released: 1997
- Recorded: 1996
- Genre: Alternative rock
- Length: 15:14
- Label: Risk Records
- Producer: Andrew D. Prickett

The Autumns chronology
Suicide at Strell Park (1997)	The Angel Pool (1997)

Professional ratings
Review scores
Source	Rating
Allmusic	4/5 stars

Suicide at Strell Park is the debut release by the American alternative rock band The Autumns.

== Track listing ==
1. "Pale Trembles a Gale" – 3:59
2. "Apple" – 3:56
3. "Rose Catcher" – 3:23
4. "Suicide at Strell Park" – 3:56
