= The Resignation =

Studio album by Rx Bandits
- Released: July 15, 2003
- Recorded: February & March 2003
- Genre: Pop punk; alternative rock; reggae rock; ska punk
- Length: 59:42
- Label: Drive-Thru
- Producer: Christopher Fudurich, Matthew Embree

Rx Bandits chronology
Progress (2001)	The Resignation (2003)	...And the Battle Begun (2006)

Professional ratings
Review scores
Source	Rating
Allmusic	4/5 stars

The Resignation is the fourth full-length release from American ska punk band Rx Bandits. It peaked at #148 on the Billboard 200 and #5 on Top Heatseekers.

== Background ==
In March 2003, the band were recording their next album.

== Release ==
In April and May 2003, the band embarked on a tour of Europe. On April 30, The Resignation was announced for release in July. The band returned to the US, where they toured with Fairweather and No Motiv. A few shows in, the first week of tour was moved to the end, and Steel Train, the Fight, Northstar, and Breaking Pangaea were added as support acts. The Resignation was released on July 15, 2003. Between October and December, the band supported Something Corporate on their headlining US tour. Towards its conclusion, Rx Bandits dropped off, citing personal reasons. In March and April 2004, the band went on a tour of Europe, with Desa and Howards Alias. Following this, the band went on a southwest and west coast tour with Brazil and Mêlée, which ran into May 2004. They played a handful of East Coast US dates with Big D and the Kids Table and the Exit in September 2004, before embarking on a European tour in October and November 2004 with Chris Murray of King Apparatus.

== Track listing ==
All songs written by Matthew Embree, except where noted.

1. "Sell You Beautiful" (Embree, Steve Choi) – 3:37
2. "Prophetic" (Embree, Choi) – 4:54
3. "Newsstand Rock (Exposition)" – 2:52
4. "Overcome (The Recapitulation)" – 3:46
5. "Never Slept So Soundly" – 5:41
6. "Taking Chase as the Serpent Slithers" – 4:41
7. "Republic" (Embree, Chris Sheets) – 4:17
8. "Mastering the List" (Embree, Choi) – 7:23
9. "Falling Down the Mountain" (Embree, Choi) – 5:30
10. "Dinna-Dawg (And the Inevitable Onset of Lunacy)" (Embree, Choi) – 6:36
11. "Pal-Treaux" – 4:38
12. "Decrescendo" (Embree, Choi) – 5:47

== Personnel ==
- Matthew Embree – vocals, guitar
- Steve Choi – guitar, keyboards
- Steven Jess Borth II. – saxophone, keyboards, backing vocals
- Chris Sheets – trombone, backing vocals, percussion
- Joseph Troy – bass
- Christopher Tsagakis – drums

== Additional notes ==
- Guitars, bass, drums, and some keyboards on this album were all recorded live. Vocals, horns, percussion and additional keyboard parts were then overdubbed. They only allowed themselves a limited number of takes for each parts. Once a take was recorded, it was left as it was, with no post-thought interference.
- Previously responsible for writing all the material, Embree this time shared songwriting duties with Steve Choi.
- Also of note is the album cover, entitled "Predictable", which was originally a painting by Aaron Nagel, a Bay Area artist and member of both Link 80 and DESA.
- The album also includes a DVD featuring live performances of "Sell You Beautiful," "Who Would've Thought," and "Progress;" an acoustic performance by Matt Embree of "Overcome (The Recapitulation);" a 4-minute interview with Matt about the recording of The Resignation; and a collection of live and studio photos.
- The first pressing of the DVD had audio synchronization problems with the live video segments. This was caused by an oversight of audio encoding. Drive Thru has since fixed the problem for subsequent pressings.
