= In the Russet Gold of This Vain Hour =

Studio album by The Autumns
- Released: 2000
- Recorded: Prairie Sun, Cotati and September Sound, London, 1999
- Genre: Alternative rock
- Length: 47:28
- Label: Risk Records
- Producer: Simon Raymonde

The Autumns chronology
Winter in a Silver Box EP (1998)	In the Russet Gold of This Vain Hour (2000)	Le Carillon EP (2001)

Professional ratings
Review scores
Source	Rating
Allmusic	3/5 stars

In the Russet Gold of This Vain Hour is the second album by the American alternative rock band The Autumns, released in 2000.

== Track listing ==
All songs written by The Autumns.

1. "Boy with the Aluminum Stilts"
2. "Unfolding and Fading"
3. "Siren Wine"
4. "Oriel"
5. "June in Her Frost & Fur"
6. "Mistral Chimes at Nightfall"
7. "Bicycle"
8. "The Wreathe and the Chain"
9. "Witch Hazel"
10. "In the Russet Gold of This Vain Hour"
