= Lover, the Lord Has Left Us... =

Lover, The Lord has Left Us...

Studio album by The Sound of Animals Fighting
- Released: May 30, 2006
- Recorded: 2005
- Genre: Experimental rock, art rock, ambient
- Length: 56:07
- Label: Equal Vision
- Producer: Rich Balling

The Sound of Animals Fighting chronology
Tiger and the Duke (2005)	Lover, The Lord has Left Us... (2006)	The Ocean and the Sun (2008)

Professional ratings
Review scores
Source	Rating
AbsolutePunk	(53%)
Allmusic	3/5 stars

Lover, the Lord has Left Us... is the second studio album by the experimental rock band The Sound of Animals Fighting. The album was released on May 30, 2006 through Equal Vision Records but will still use Rich Balling's Stars & Satellites imprint.

The album contains songs with considerably different timbre than the songs on the band's first album. For example, "Stockhausen, es ist Ihr Gehirn, das ich suche" utilizes kitchen sounds and a German opera singer and "Un'aria" and "Un'aria Ancora" are a cappella tracks sung by Craig Owens of Chiodos.

== Track listing ==
No.	Title	Lead vocal	Length
1.	"Intro"	–	0:40
2.	"Un'aria"	Craig Owens	1:05
3.	"Skullflower"	Anthony Green, Amirtha Kidambi (spoken word)	4:15
4.	"My Horse Must Lose"	Matthew Kelly, Newsha Mohajeri (spoken word)	4:22
5.	"Chiriacho Summit"	(spoken word)	1:30
6.	"Horses in the Sky"	Craig Owens	5:21
7.	"Stockhausen, Es Ist Ihr Gehirn, Das Ich Suche (German for "Stockhausen, it is your brain that I am looking for.")"	Anthony Green	8:02
8.	"Prayers on Fire"	Amirtha Kidambi (Sanskrit)	3:29
9.	"The Golden Boy That Was Swallowed by the Sea"	(spoken word)	1:42
10.	"This Heat"	Keith Goodwin	10:35
11.	"Un'aria Ancora (Italian for "An Air Again")"	Craig Owens	0:39
12.	"St. Broadrick Is in Antarctica"	Rich Balling	2:58
13.	"The Heretic"	Matthew Kelly	4:55
14.	"There Can Be No Dispute That Monsters Live Among Us"	Richard Balling, Sr.	6:33

== Personnel ==
Position	Name	Animal
Producer, vocals	Rich Balling (RX Bandits)	Nightingale
Guitar, vocals	Matt Embree (RX Bandits)	Walrus
Drums, programming	Chris Tsagakis (RX Bandits)	Lynx
Live guitar	Steve Choi (RX Bandits)	N/A
Live bass	Joe Troy (RX Bandits)	N/A
Recording, mixing	Ryan Baker	Hyena
Vocals	Anthony Green (Circa Survive)	Skunk
Album artwork	Stephen O'Malley (Sunn O))))	N/A
Vocals	Craig Owens (Chiodos)	Ram
Vocals	Keith Goodwin (Good Old War)	Penguin
Vocals	Matthew Kelly (The Autumns)	Llama

== Additional notes ==
Musical Styling

Lover, the Lord Has Left Us... is considerably different from Tiger and the Duke in many aspects. The music centers on electronic instruments such as synthesizers, drum machines, and computer-based music programs, rather than guitars or drums. Tiger and the Duke has a more band-oriented sound, whereas Lover, the Lord Has Left Us... has a more collaborative feel. There also exists great variation between different tracks. For example, "Prayers on Fire" has a considerably ethnic feel, due to Sanskrit vocalizations and samplings of a sitar. In contrast, "Horses in the Sky" is laden with heavy, incomprehensible drum n' bass grooves, though the chorus is much more organized and coherent. "The Heretic" is a soft ballad with rich, flowing string arrangements and lyrics associated with anorexia.

- The title "Lover, the Lord Has Left Us..." is a line from a song by Planes Mistaken for Stars used prior to the lyric's release on their last album "Mercy."
- On April 11, 2006, the band released "Skullflower" on their purevolume account.
- "The Golden Boy That was Swallowed by the Sea" features a recitation of the lyrics from the Swans song of the same name over a noise backing.
- "The Heretic" includes lyrics that relate to a song discussing similar themes on Tiger and the Duke called "Act II: All is Ash or the Light Shining Through It." Both songs include the phrases, "Flesh is heretic. My body is a witch. I am burning it." The lyrics allude to a poem entitled "Anorexic" by Eavan Boland. Other lyrics in the song continue this idea.
- Rich Balling's father sings on "There Can Be No Dispute That Monsters Live Among Us".
- "Chiriacho Summit" is also a song by the post-hardcore group Frodus.

=== Different languages in songs ===
- On the track "My Horse Must Lose", a woman speaks in Persian, and translates to "Look! Look! At the horses in the sky! I've seen my destiny! My horse must lose, hahaha!" and at the end "I will answer your voice directly. It's the sound of my breath."
- "Skullflower" features Amirtha Kidambi singing a central Hindu prayer in Sanskrit:

"Tamaso ma jyotir gamaya / Mrityor ma amritam gamaya" which translates to: "Lead us from darkness to light. Lead us from death to immortality."

- The opera singer in "Stockhausen, es ist Ihr Gehirn, das ich suche" takes her lyrical abstracts from a German poem of the Romantic era by Friedrich Rückert called "Warum willst du and're fragen," later set to song by Clara Josephine Wieck Schumann in a 3 song cycle written in 1841. The text is written in an older archaic form, making it difficult for translation by those who aren't familiar with the grammatical structure spoken and sung during the mid-19th century. The lyrics are taken from the first and last lines of the song. In German, "Warum willst du and're fragen...Sieh mein Aug', ich liebe dich!" Loosely translated in English, "Why do you want to ask others...See my eye, I love you!"
