= The Sound of Animals Fighting =

American rock band

- Origin: Los Angeles, California, U.S.
- Genres: Post-hardcore; math rock; experimental rock; ambient; progressive rock; art rock
- Years active: 2004–2009, 2014, 2019, 2022–present
- Labels: Stars & Satellites, Equal Vision, Epitaph
- Members: Rich Balling (Nightingale); Anthony Green (Skunk); Matt Embree (Walrus); Chris Tsagakis (Lynx); Steve Choi (Koala); Matthew Kelly (Wolf); Keith Goodwin (Penguin)
- Website: thesoundofanimalsfighting.com

The Sound of Animals Fighting is an American rock supergroup founded by Rich Balling of Rx Bandits. In the band's initial run, they released a trilogy of records between 2004 and 2008, and performed only four live shows, following their second release in 2006. The band's live lineup consisted of 12 different musicians. The band often employed the use of animal masks to conceal their identity. The group was inactive after 2009, with brief spurts of touring in 2014 and 2019, before announcing a new extended play and nationwide US tour in 2022.

== History ==
=== Formation and first two albums (2004–2006) ===
The group performed only one small run of shows in Southern California and Las Vegas from August 24 to August 27, 2006. Matt Embree (Rx Bandits), Anthony Green (Circa Survive), Craig Owens (Chiodos), and Technology (Rx Bandits' Chris Tsagakis' side project) were the opening acts. Prior to the shows, it was difficult to envision which members would be performing at the live shows; Rx Bandits members Matt Embree, Steve Choi, Chris Tsagakis, and bassist Joe Troy were a few of the confirmed musicians. The band released a DVD documenting the shows entitled "We Must Become The Change We Want To See."

Aaron Nagel and Norton Wisdom (see Banyan) did live paintings on stage during the band's set..

=== The Ocean and the Sun (2007–2010) ===
On October 15, 2007, Balling stated in a bulletin and blog post on the group's Myspace page that there would be a new album released on Epitaph Records in the future.

Vocal credits include Embree making his first vocal appearance on "Blessings..." and Green returning for the title track,"I, the Swan," "Another Leather Lung," and "The Heraldic Beak of the Manufacturer's Medallion," and Balling returning on "I, the Swan," "Cellophane," and "On the Occasion.." Matthew Kelly appears on "On the Occasion." Other vocalists include Jessica Mcwhirter (The Lings) on "On the Occasion," and Lauren Coleman on "Uzbekistan" and spoken word on the title track. Charlene Rogers appears performing spoken word on "Ahab" and Mark Bush appears playing trumpet during "Cellophane."

The band issued a series of 400 masks, 100 of each of four designs, paired with a 7" for a limited preorder of the album.

On July 8, 2009, the band posted a MySpace blog entry with links to official music videos for "I, the Swan" and "Another Leather Lung."

On December 29, 2009, at an Anthony Green show at the Roxy, Matt Embree joined Green on stage and performed combined versions of "Skullflower" and "Stockhausen, Es Ist Ihr Gehirn, Das Ich Suche."

Guitarist Matt Embree and drummer Chris Tsagakis played abridged versions of several songs by the group under the name "Biceratops" at Alex's Bar in Long Beach, CA on January 15, 2010.

=== Inactive years, live reunions and Apeshit (2011–present) ===
It was announced on November 12, 2013, that the band would be playing seven shows in March 2014.

In December 2018, the band announced they would be playing 8 shows in February–March 2019. The Sound of Animals Fighting had been "almost silent" since their tour in 2014.

In October 2022, it was announced that the band would be playing 13 shows in January 2023.

On December 8, 2022, TSOAF released a four-track EP Apeshit via Born Losers Records, marking their first studio material released in 14 years. In October 2023, the group released a live album on VHS and vinyl titled, Live In Philadelphia, that was recorded at Franklin Music Hall during the band's 2023 tour.

On April 21, 2025, TSOAF created a messenger channel, inviting fans to "Help us plan our tour!"

On July 21, 2025, TSOAF announced a new 10-track LP titled The Maiden via Born Losers Records on Bandcamp.

== Live lineup ==
The band's live lineup consisted of 12 musicians in 2006, most of whom contributed to at least one studio album. At the time, every member of Rich Balling's former band, the RX Bandits, were members of the live lineup.

2006 Live Lineup

- Anthony Green - vocals
- Rich Balling - vocals
- Craig Owens - vocals
- Keith Goodwin - vocals, guitar
- Matthew Kelly - vocals, guitar
- Matt Embree - guitar, vocals
- Steve Choi - guitar, keyboard
- Joe Troy - bass
- Chris Tsagakis - drums
- Chris Sheets - percussion
- Nathan Hand - percussion, sampling
- Bradley Bell - keyboard

The samples that Ryan Baker supplied via laptop were female vocals and additional instruments such as turntables and horns that Rich Balling provided on record but chose not to physically play live.

In 2014, the live lineup consisted of only seven musicians, "the core four and guests" as Rich Balling said in a 2014 interview.

2014 Live Lineup

- Anthony Green - vocals
- Rich Balling - vocals
- Matthew Kelly - vocals, guitar
- Matt Embree - guitar, vocals
- Steve Choi - guitar, keyboard
- Chris Tsagakis - drums
- Jonathan Hischke - Bass

2019 and 2023 Live Lineup

- Anthony Green - vocals
- Rich Balling - vocals, keyboard
- Matthew Kelly - vocals, guitar
- Matt Embree - guitar, vocals
- Steve Choi - guitar, keyboard
- Chris Tsagakis - drums
- Jonathan Hischke - Bass
- Keith Goodwin - Vocals

== Discography ==
=== Studio albums ===
- Tiger and the Duke (2005)
- Lover, the Lord Has Left Us... (2006)
- The Ocean and the Sun (2008)
- The Maiden (2025)

=== EPs ===
- Apeshit (2022)

=== Video albums ===
- We Must Become the Change We Want to See (2007)
- Live In Philadelphia (2023)
