= Sargent House =

American management company and record label

- Founded: 2006
- Founder: Cathy Pellow
- Genre: Experimental rock; alternative rock; punk rock; progressive rock
- Country of origin: United States
- Location: Los Angeles, California
- Official website: sargenthouse.com

Sargent House is an American management company and record label based in Los Angeles. It was founded in June 2006 by Cathy Pellow, who is a music video commissioner for Atlantic Records and also owns a music video production company called Refused TV. Pellow began managing the rock outfit RX Bandits in 2006. The band needed to release its new album ...And the Battle Begun, so Pellow decided to launch her own record label (also to be able to do things differently from the traditional model of record labels). From that point onward, Pellow continued to manage bands and release records, all under the Sargent House banner.

== History ==
Chronologically from when Pellow first began working with them, Sargent House manages the RX Bandits, These Arms Are Snakes, Maps & Atlases, Russian Circles, Tera Melos, Fang Island, Daughters, Red Sparowes, Good Old War, Native, This Town Needs Guns, Bygones, Lisa Papineau, Big Sir, Cast Spells, Zechs Marquise, Zach Hill, Le Butcherettes, Adebisi Shank, Hella, And So I Watch You From Afar and Helms Alee. Additionally, Pellow also helmed the Rodriguez Lopez Productions imprint, founded by The Mars Volta guitarist Omar Rodríguez-López. Sonny Kay came from the Gold Standard Labs label as art director for Rodriguez Lopez Productions (RLP) and Sargent House. RLP launched in March 2009, with its first release by El Grupo Nuevo de Omar Rodriguez Lopez titled Cryptomnesia out May 5, 2009. The partnership between Rodriguez Lopez Productions and Sargent House ended in early 2014.

Sargent House managed bands also have a release on the SH label. The label has a "no submissions" policy, preferring to add new bands stemming from within Sargent House.

As of March 2023, Pellow has stepped down from management duties following musician Henry Kohen (Mylets) posting a video on Reddit alleging widespread abuse at the label. Chelsea Wolfe, Lingua Ignota, and King Woman, who had all previously cut ties with the label, released statements on social media alluding to similar negative experiences. Henry Kohen of the band Mylets released a statement detailing the allegations and experiences, such as being sexually assaulted by the owner of a venue that was a regular customer of Sargent House in 2015 and being ignored when he told the record label management about the incident. Cathy Pellow publicly apologized for her past behavior and acknowledged the events, expressing genuine shame and remorse. Brian Cook, bassist for Russian Circles and Sumac, defended Pellow.

The most critical moment came in late 2021, when Kristin Hayter (known as Lingua Ignota) publicly accused her former romantic partner and labelmate, Alexis S. F. Marshall (singer of Daughters), of sexual, mental, and emotional abuse against her. Hayter detailed in a note on social media that she had suffered "multiple sexual assaults/rapes" while she was sleeping, and that this experience had led her to attempt suicide. Marshall vehemently denied these allegations, assuring that he had not engaged in any form of abusive behavior. However, Sargent House acted quickly; according to its statement, they had already terminated their working relationship with Marshall in August 2021, before Hayter made her statement public. They explained that they initially remained silent to respect the victim's privacy. The label's founder, Cathy Pellow, expressed that the situation had "emotionally destroyed" her and reaffirmed her stance of not condoning any kind of abuse, underlining the impact of these allegations on a label that was considered a haven for female artists in a predominantly male genre.

== Roster ==
=== Active ===
- A Dead Forest Index
- Alto Arc
- The Armed
- Brutus
- David Eugene Edwards
- Earth
- Emma Ruth Rundle
- Helms Alee
- How to Dress Well
- Ioanna Gika
- Mutoid Man
- Nicole Miglis
- Russian Circles
- RX Bandits
- Torment & Glory
- TTNG
- Wovenhand

=== Inactive ===
- Big Walnuts Yonder
- Botch
- Bygones
- Hella
- Marriages
- ME&LP
- Red Sparowes
- Tera Melos

=== Former ===
- Adebisi Shank
- Alexis Marshall
- And So I Watch You from Afar
- Big Sir
- Blis
- Boris
- Bosnian Rainbows
- Cast Spells
- Chelsea Wolfe
- Crypts
- Daughters
- Deafheaven
- Deantoni Parks
- DIIV
- Disheveled Cuss
- Empty Houses
- Eureka the Butcher
- Fang Island
- Good Old War
- Gypsyblood
- Indian Handcrafts
- Io Echo
- Jaye Jayle
- King Woman
- Le Butcherettes
- Lingua Ignota
- Lisa Papineau
- Love You Moon
- Miserable
- No Spill Blood
- Maps & Atlases
- Mrs. Piss
- Mylets
- Native
- Nurses
- Omar Rodriguez Lopez
- Red Fang
- Saudade
- Storefront Church
- Therapies Son
- These Arms Are Snakes
- Zach Hill
- Zechs Marquise
- Zorch
