= Pyramids with Nadja =

Studio album by Pyramids with Nadja
- Released: 23 November 2009
- Genre: Experimental; Post-rock; Dark ambient Drone metal Experimental metal
- Length: 57:46
- Label: Hydra Head Records (CD) (HH666-194)

Pyramids with Nadja is a collaborative album by the bands Pyramids and Nadja.

== Track listing ==
1. "Into the Silent Waves"
2. "Another War"
3. "Sound of Ice and Grass"
4. "An Angel Was Heard to Cry Over the City of Rome"

== Credits ==
=== Pyramids ===
- F. Coloccia
- M. Dean
- M. Kraig
- R. Loren
- D. William

=== Nadja ===
- A. Baker
- L. Buckareff

=== Other ===
- Simon Raymonde: Bass on tracks 1 and 4
- Albin Julius: Vocals on track 4
- Chris Simpson: Vocals on track 2
- Colin Marston: Co-production, and engineering on tracks 1 and 4
- Mixed and Mastered by James Plotkin
