= Matt Embree =

American singer and guitarist

Matthew Embree
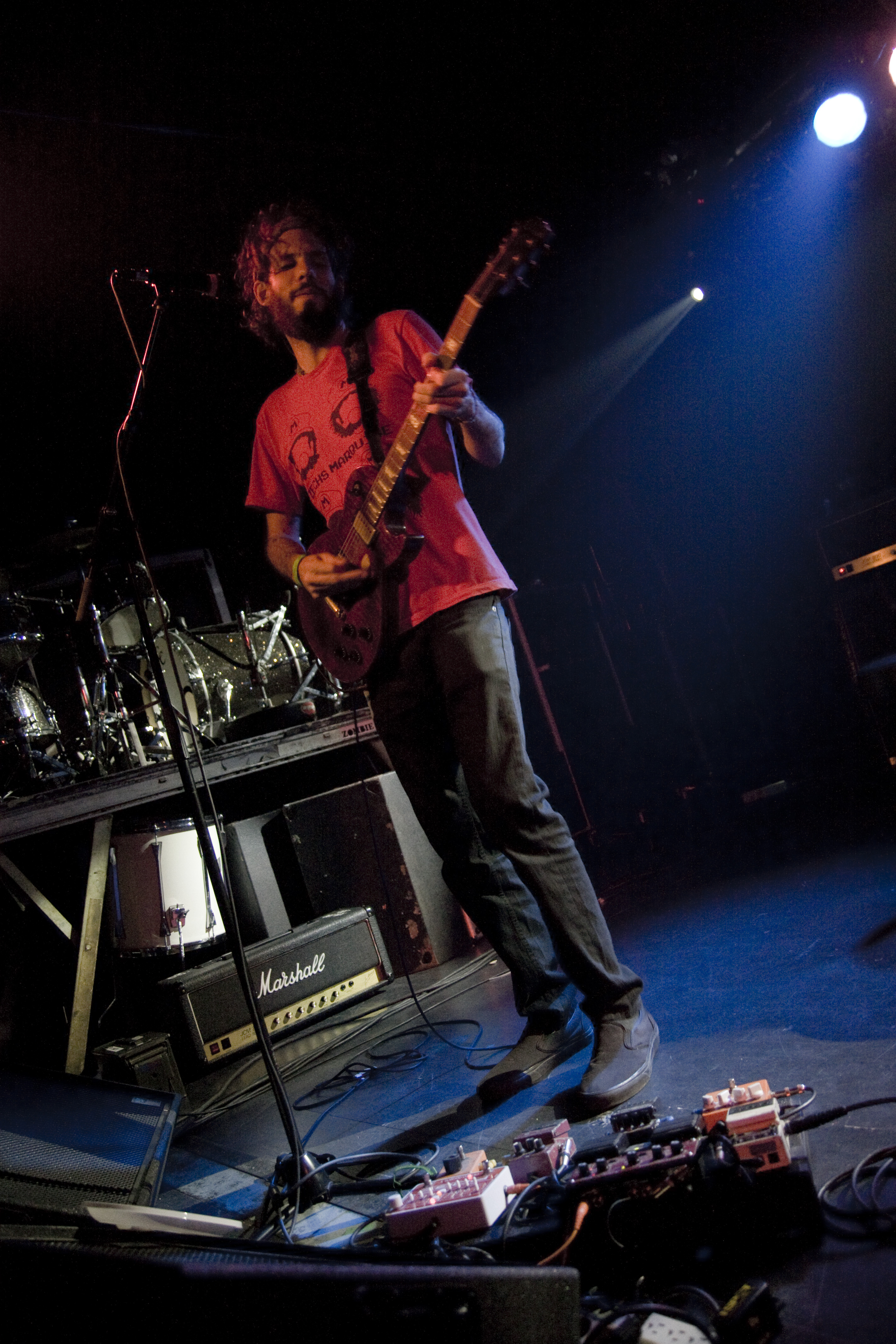
- Embree touring with RX Bandits in Barcelona, Spain in 2010

Background information
- Instruments: Vocals, guitar, percussion, keyboards

Matthew Embree is an American singer and guitarist best known as the frontman of Rx Bandits. He also plays guitar and provides occasional vocals for The Sound of Animals Fighting, in which he is known as "The Walrus". He produced their 2008 album The Ocean and the Sun. Since 2016, Embree has been a touring member of Dispatch.

Embree has contributed to several other hip hop, alternative, art, progressive, and psychedelic rock bands including Seekret Socyetee, Coke vs. Bills, Pebaluna, and Biceratops, among others.

In 2008, he released Waxwane, his first solo album, under the name Love You Moon. Embree wrote, produced, and played all the instruments on the album, except for a few tracks featuring drums by Chris Tsagakis and vocals by Lauren Coleman. Embree also started MDB Records in 2002, which is based in Seal Beach, California. In 2006, Embree began collaborating with management/label Sargent House, who helped MDB release of one of Embree's other band's albums. Love You Moon's debut album Waxwane was released by Sargent House/MDB Digitally on May 20, 2008, with a physical release that August.
