= List of The Ocean band members =

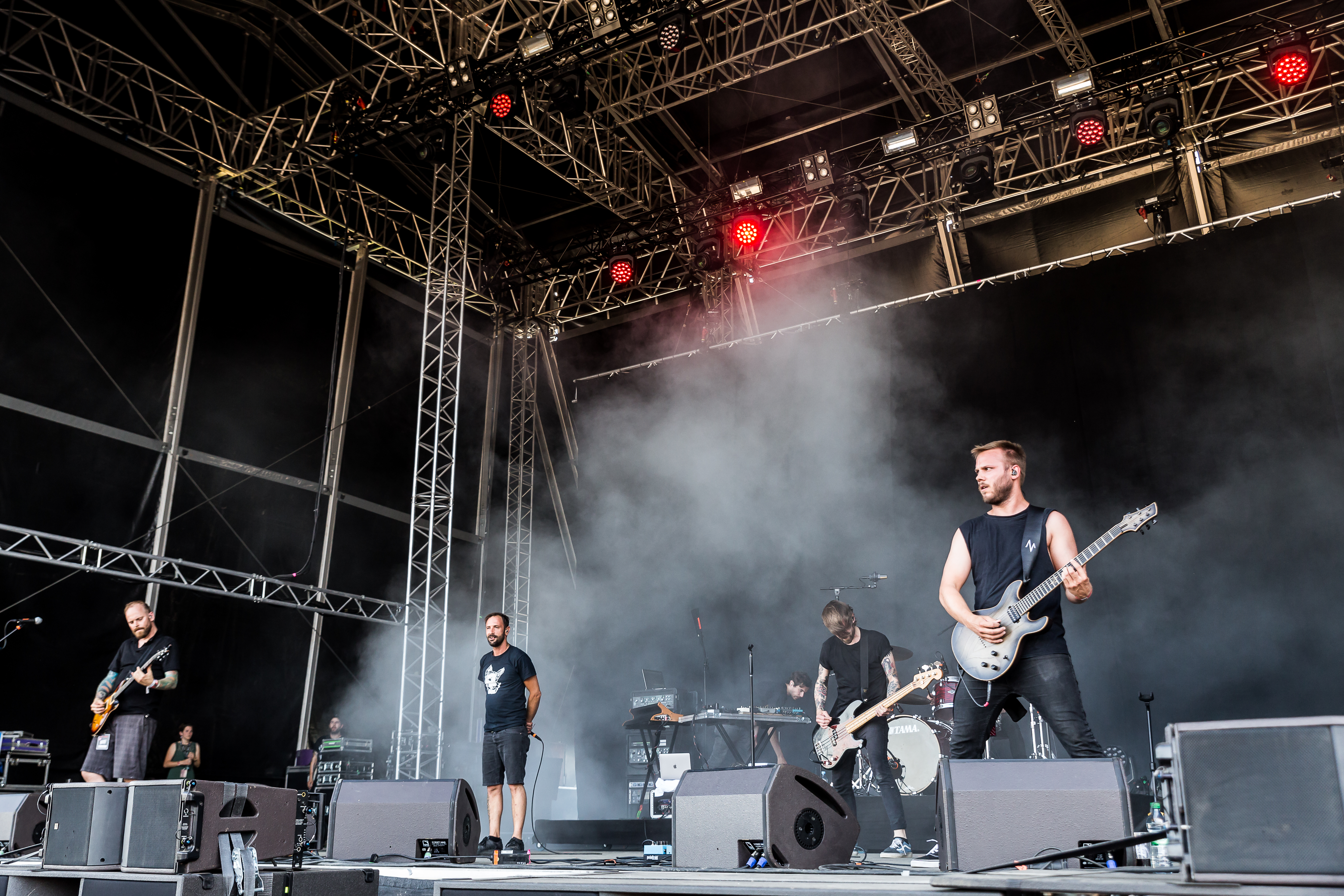
The Ocean at Full Force 2019

The Ocean is a German post-metal band that was formed in 2000. It has gone through many different line-ups over the years. Initially, it was called The Ocean Collective because it had a rotating group of members and long-term collaborators, all of whom were centered around the band's guitarist and composer, Robin Staps. However, in 2008, the band changed its name to The Ocean and adopted a more traditional line-up. This included vocalist Mike Pilat, guitarist Jonathan Nido, bassist Louis Jucker, and drummer Luc Hess, in addition to Staps. This line-up was stable until 2009 when Pilat left and was replaced by Loïc Rossetti. This line-up, which included Staps, Rossetti, bassist Mattias Hägerstrand, and drummer Paul Seidel, has been the most stable in the band's history, until the departure of Nido and Hess and the temporary hiatus of Jucker. Seidel, Rossetti, and guitarist David Ramis Åhfeldt stepped down in 2025 and drummer Jordi Farré was added to the lineup alongside Staps and Hägerstrand.

== Personnel ==
=== Current members of The Ocean ===
- Robin Staps – guitar, programming, songwriting (2000–present), bass, drums (2002), vocals (2007)
- Mattias Hägerstrand – bass (2015–present)
- Jordi Farré - drums (2025-present)
- Enrico Tiberi - vocals (2026-present)
- Lane Shi - vocals (2026-present)
- Emmanuel Jessua - guitar (2026-present)
- Marco Gennaro - guitar (2026-present)

=== Members of The Ocean Collective ===
Active members of The Ocean Collective

- Loïc Rossetti – lead vocals, clean vocals (2009–2025)
- Robin Staps – guitar, programming (2000–present), bass, drums (2002), vocals (2007)
- Mattias Hägerstrand – bass (2015–present)
- David Ramis Åhlfeldt – guitar (2018–present)
- Vincent Membrez – piano, keyboards (2010–present)
- Dalai Theofilopoulou – cello (2010, 2015–present)

Non-active members of The Ocean Collective

- Nico Webers – lead vocals (2000–2001, 2006–2008), vocals (2005–2006), backing vocals (2004–2005), visuals (2004–2005)
- Markus Gundall – lead vocals (2001–2004)
- Mathias "Meta" Bünte – lead vocals (2004–2006, session 2007–2010)
- Mike Pilat – lead vocals (2007–2009), clean vocals (2008–2009), bass (2007)
- Andreas "Hille" Hillebrand – guitar (2003–2006)
- Matt Beels – guitar (2006–2007, live stand-in 2007–2010)
- Walid Farruque – guitar (2007)
- Jonathan Nido – guitar (2007–2013)
- Damian "Damo" Murdoch – guitar, backing vocals (2013–2017)
- Jonathan "Joni" Heine – bass (2002–2005, 2008 touring)
- Gordon Hünies – bass (2005–2007), percussion (2006–2007)
- Hannes Hüfken – bass (2007–2008)
- Louis Jucker – bass, backing vocals (2008–2013)
- Chris Breuer – bass (2013–2015, 2013 session)
- Jan "Janus" Oberg – drums (2002), vocals (2007 session)
- Torge Liessmann – drums (2002–2007)
- Luc Hess – drums (2008–2013)
- Gerd Kornmann – percussion, backing vocals (2000–2006)
- Yuky Ryang – cello (2005)
- Nils "Der Lünd" Lindenhayn – visuals (2001–2004, 2005–2006)
- Peter Voigtmann – keyboards, synths (2018–2023)
- Paul Seidel – drums (2013–2025)

Touring members of The Ocean Collective

- Peach – vocals (2001)
- Alex Petrovic – vocals (2001)
- Gunter Berlin – guitar (2000–2001)
- Alex Roos – guitar (2002), vocals (2001 session)
- Dirk Wilhelm – guitar (2003)
- Micky Hirschbrich – bass (2000–2002)
- Younès Chraibi – bass (2006–2007)
- Ulf Diehl – drums (2000–2002)
- Craig Murray – visuals (2010–2013)

Session members of The Ocean Collective and other contributors

- Thomas Herold – vocals (2004)
- Tomas Hallbom – vocals (2005–2013 session, 2006 touring)
- Nate Newton – vocals (2005–2007)
- Sean Ingram – vocals (2005)
- Erçüment Kasalar – vocals (2005)
- Carsten Albrecht – vocals (2005)
- Eric Kalsbeek – vocals (2007)
- Jason Emry – vocals (2007)
- Dwid Hellion – vocals (2007)
- Caleb Scofield – vocals (2007)
- René Noçon – clean vocals (2007)
- Sheila Aguinaldo – clean vocals (2010)
- Mitch Hertz – guitar (2010–2013)
- Katharina Selheim – piano (2007)
- Lena Bretschneider – violin (2003)
- Demeter Braun – violin (2004)
- Christoph von der Namer – violin (2007)
- Céline Portat – violin (2010)
- Estelle Beiner – violin (2010)
- Regula Schwab – violin (2013)
- Karina Suslov – viola (2007)
- Isabelle Gottraux – viola (2013)
- Rebekka Mahnke – cello (2003–2004)
- Stephan Heinemeyer – cello (2007)
- Esther Monnat – cello (2010)
- Catherine Vey – cello (2013)
- Lionel Gafner – upright bass (2010)
- John Gürtler – saxophone (2007)
- Jérôme Correa – saxophone (2010)
- Hans Albert Staps – trumpet (2010)
- D. Töne – trombone (2002)
- Robert Gutowski – trombone (2010)
- Tove Langhoff – clarinet (2004)
- Daniel Eichholz – glockenspiel (2007)
- James Yates – vibraphone (2010)
- Jonas Olsson – tambourine (2007)
- Tomas Svensson – samples (2007)

== Timeline ==
=== Personnel / album chart ===
Album	Islands/Tides	Fogdiver	Fluxion	Aeolian	Precambrian	Fluxion (w/ Mike Pilat)	Heliocentric	Anthropocentric	Pelagial	Phanerozoic I: Palaeozoic
Year	2001	2003	2004	2006	2007	2009	2010	2010	2013	2018
Lead Vocals	Markus Gundall		Meta		Mike Pilat		Loïc Rosetti
2nd Vocals	Gerd Kornmann		Markus Gundall	Nico Webers
3rd Vocals				Tomas Hallbom	Meta
guitar	Robin Staps
2nd guitar					Matt Beels		Jonathan Nido			Damian Murdoch
bass	Robin Staps	Jonathan Heine			Mike Pilat	Jonathan Heine	Louis Jucker			Mattias Hägerstrand
2nd bass					Hannes Huefken				Chris Breuer
drums	Robin Staps	Torge Liessmann					Luc Hess			Paul Seidel
perc	Gerd Kornmann					Gerd Kornmann
cello				Yuky Ryang			Dalai Theofilopoulou			Dalai Theofilopoulou
Piano							Vincent Membrez

== Lineups ==
Years	Lineups	Album releases
2000–2001	Robin Staps – guitar, programming; Nico Webers – lead vocals; Gunter Berlin – guitar (live); Micky Hirschbrich – bass (live); Ulf Diehl – drums (live); Gerd Kornmann – percussion, backing vocals
2001	Robin Staps – guitar, programming, bass; Markus Gundall – lead vocals; Micky Hirschbrich – bass (live); Ulf Diehl – drums (live); Gerd Kornmann – percussion, backing vocals; Nils Lindenhayn – visuals
2001–2002	Robin Staps – guitar, programming, bass; Markus Gundall – lead vocals; Gerd Kornmann – percussion, backing vocals; Nils Lindenhayn – visuals	Islands/Tides (2001)
2002	Robin Staps – guitar, programming, bass; Markus Gundall – lead vocals; Alex Roos – guitar (live); Jonathan Heine – bass; Gerd Kornmann – percussion, backing vocals; Jan Oberg – drums; Nils Lindenhayn – visuals
2002–2004	Robin Staps – guitar, programming; Markus Gundall – lead vocals; Andreas Hillebrand – guitar; Jonathan Heine – bass; Torge Liessmann – drums; Gerd Kornmann – percussion, backing vocals; Nils Lindenhayn – visuals	Fogdiver (2003)
2004–2005	Robin Staps – guitar, programming; Meta – lead vocals; Andreas Hillebrand – guitar; Jonathan Heine – bass; Torge Liessmann – drums; Gerd Kornmann – percussion, backing vocals; Nico Webers – visuals, backing vocals (live)	Fluxion (2004)
2005–2006	Robin Staps – guitar, programming; Meta – lead vocals; Nico Webers – vocals; Andreas Hillebrand – guitar; Gordon Hünies – bass; Torge Liessmann – drums; Gerd Kornmann – percussion, backing vocals; Yuky Ryang – cello (live); Nils Lindenhayn – visuals	Aeolian (2006)
2006	Robin Staps – guitar, programming; Nico Webers – lead vocals; Matt Beels – guitar (live); Gordon Hünies – bass; Torge Liessmann – drums; Gerd Kornmann – percussion, backing vocals; Nils Lindenhayn – visuals
2007	Robin Staps – guitar, programming, vocals; Nico Webers – lead vocals; Matt Beels – guitar (live); Walid Farruque – guitar (live); Mike Pilat – bass, vocals; Torge Liessmann – drums; Meta – lead vocals (session)	Precambrian (2007)
2007	Robin Staps – guitar, programming; Nico Webers – lead vocals; Mike Pilat – vocals, bass; Jonathan Nido – guitar; Torge Liessmann – drums
2008	Robin Staps – guitar, programming; Mike Pilat – lead vocals; Nico Webers – lead vocals; Jonathan Nido – guitar; Jonathan Heine – bass (live); Luc Hess – drums
2008–2009	Robin Staps – guitar, programming; Mike Pilat – lead vocals; Jonathan Nido – guitar; Louis Jucker – bass, backing vocals; Luc Hess – drums	Fluxion (with Mike Pilat) (2009)
2009–2013	Robin Staps – guitar, programming; Loïc Rossetti – lead vocals; Jonathan Nido – guitar; Louis Jucker – bass, backing vocals; Luc Hess – drums	Pelagial (2013)
2013–2015	Robin Staps – guitar, programming; Loïc Rossetti – lead vocals; Damian Murdoch – guitar, backing vocals; Chris Breuer – bass; Paul Seidel – drums
2015–2017	Robin Staps – guitar, programming; Loïc Rossetti – lead vocals; Damian Murdoch – guitar, backing vocals; Mattias Hägerstrand – bass; Paul Seidel – drums	The Quiet Observer (2015)
2017–2023	Robin Staps – guitar, programming; Loïc Rossetti – lead vocals; Mattias Hägerstrand – bass; Paul Seidel – drums; David Ramis Åhfeldt – guitar; Peter Voigtmann – synths	Phanerozoic I: Palaeozoic (2018); Phanerozoic II: Mesozoic / Cenozoic (2020); Holocene (2023)
2023–2025	Robin Staps – guitar, programming; Loïc Rossetti – lead vocals; Mattias Hägerstrand – bass; Paul Seidel – drums; David Ramis Åhfeldt – guitar
2025–2026	Robin Staps – guitar, programming; Mattias Hägerstrand – bass; Jordi Farré – drums
2026–present	Robin Staps – guitar, programming; Mattias Hägerstrand – bass; Jordi Farré – drums; Enrico Tiberi - lead vocals; Lane Shi - lead vocals; Emmanuel Jessua - guitar; Marco Gennaro - guitar	Solaris
