= Jonas Olsson (music producer) =

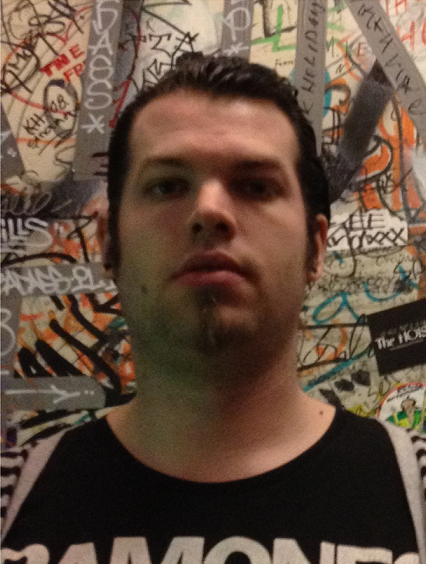
- Olsson in 2012

Background information
- Born: 10 June 1981 (age 45); Uddevalla, Sweden
- Genres: Pop
- Occupations: Music producer, composer, songwriter

Jonas Olsson (born 10 June 1981) is a Finnish music producer, audio engineer and songwriter. He has worked and collaborated with many international acts, producers, and songwriters such as Andreas Carlsson (SWE), Kristinia DeBarge (US), Radical Something (US), Rasmus Thude (DK), and The Ocean (GER).

He has also worked on many Finnish acts, including Robin, Jannika B, Poisonblack, Sami Saari, Absoluuttinen Nollapiste, Superscar, Annika Eklund, Deep Insight, Blind Channel and Callisto. Olsson is currently managed by Los Angeles–based management Perfection Shows and collaborates frequently with the production team Goodwill & MGI.

== Early life ==
Olsson is a Swedish-speaking Finn, and he was born in Uddevalla, Sweden. He grew up in Kokkola, Finland, where he had moved with his family in 1986.

== Albums produced ==
- Noir by Callisto (2006)
- Precambrian by The Ocean (2007)
- Lyijy by Poisonblack (2013)
- Boom Kah by Robin (2013)
- Minä ja Hehkumo by Pauli Hanhiniemi (2014)
- Revolutions by Blind Channel (2016)
- Blood Brothers by Blind Channel (2018)
- Violent Pop by Blind Channel (2020)
