= Solaris (The Ocean album) =

2026 studio album by the Ocean

Studio album by The Ocean
- Released: 25 September 2026
- Genres: Post-metal, progressive metal, sludge metal
- Length: 69:22
- Label: Pelagic Records

The Ocean chronology
Holocene (2023)	Solaris (2026)

Singles from Solaris
- 1. "Light Pollution" Released: 28 May 2026; 2. "Belligerence" Released: 14 July 2026; 3. "Ultima Esperanza" Released: 1 September 2026; 4. "Milk of My Dreams" Released: 17 September 2026

Solaris is the tenth studio album by German post-metal band The Ocean, released on 25 September 2026 through Pelagic Records. The album is a concept album, loosely based on Andrei Tarkovsky's 1972 sci-fi film of the same name. The album is the first to feature the band's 2026 lineup, and the first since the 2009 re-release of Fluxion to not feature Loïc Rosetti as a vocalist, following his departure from the band in 2025.

== Reception ==
The album has received mixed reviews from critics. The Progressive Subway gave the album a 5 out of 10, citing the album's poor pacing, underwhelming vocals, and bad lyricism. Dave Campbell from Metal Temple was more generous, rating the album 10 out of 10, stating: "Although the album traces a journey from the bustle of Germany to one of the most remote locations on earth, Solaris also reminds you that your journey in life is never over. This is a masterpiece of musical score, inviting you to confront the limitations of your perceptions."

== Track listing ==
All lyrics and music by Robin Staps. Additional music contributions by The Ocean Collective, Thorsten Quaeschning, Orestis Zafiriou and Simen Eifring.

=== Physical and Bandcamp ===
No.	Title	Length
1.	"52°30'11"N, 13°26'12"E"	2:10
2.	"Departure Song"	7:52
3.	"Light Pollution"	9:55
4.	"Simulacra"	17:18
5.	"Belligerence"	10:45
6.	"Ultima Esperanza"	11:49
7.	"Milk of My Dreams"	4:16
8.	"51°28'30"S, 73°6'11"W"	5:20
Total length:		69:25

=== Streaming ===
No.	Title	Length
1.	"52°30'11"N, 13°26'12"E"	2:10
2.	"Departure Song"	7:52
3.	"Light Pollution"	9:55
4.	"Simulacra, Pt. I"	9:36
5.	"Simulacra, Pt. II"	3:26
6.	"Simulacra, Pt. III"	4:15
7.	"Belligerence, Pt. I"	8:29
8.	"Belligerence, Pt. II"	2:15
9.	"Ultima Esperanza, Pt. I"	7:27
10.	"Ultima Esperanza, Pt. II"	4:21
11.	"Milk of My Dreams"	4:16
12.	"51°28'30"S, 73°6'11"W"	5:20
Total length:		69:22

== Personnel ==
The Ocean

- Mattias Hägerstrand – bass
- Jordi Farré – drums, percussion
- Robin Staps – guitars, vocals
- Emmanuel Jessua – guitars
- Marco Gennaro – guitars
- Enrico Tiberi – vocals, keys
- Lane Shi – vocals

Additional musicians

- Thorsten Quaeschning – synths
- Orestis Zafiriou – synths
- Simen Eifring – trombone
- Peter Voigtmann – extra synths on "Light Pollution"
- Jovi Zhang – vibraphone on "Light Pollution"

Additional personnel

- Karl Daniel Lidén – recording (drums, celesta, rhodes, Hammond and timpani)
- Robin Staps – recording (guitars, bass, vibraphone and vocals)
- Simen Eifring – recording (trombones)
- Orestis Zafiriou – recording (synths)
- Thorsten Quaeschning – recording (synths)
- Peter Voigtmann – recording (synths on "Light Pollution")
- Jens Bogren – mixing, mastering
- Martin Kvamme – artwork, layout
- Phillip Janta – illustration

== Charts ==
Chart performance for Solaris
Chart (2026)	Peak position
French Physical Albums (SNEP)	157
French Rock & Metal Albums (SNEP)	48
German Albums (Offizielle Top 100)	15
German Rock & Metal Albums (Offizielle Top 100)	7
