= Violent Pop =

Studio album by Blind Channel
- Released: 6 March 2020
- Recorded: 2018–2019
- Length: 36:32
- Language: English
- Label: Ranka Kustannus
- Producers: Jonas Olsson; Joonas Parkkonen

Blind Channel chronology
Blood Brothers (2018)	Violent Pop (2020)	Lifestyles of the Sick & Dangerous (2022)

Violent Pop is the third studio album by Finnish nu metal band Blind Channel, released on 6 March 2020. The first song for the album was the track, "Over My Dead Body", recorded in the summer of 2018. From that moment on, Blind Channel began writing new material. In December 2019, the band announced that the recording of their album had been completed, taking just under a year and a half to finish. Produced by Jonas Olsson, who also worked on the band's two previous albums, Revolutions and Blood Brothers. In addition, Jakob Hansen, a Danish musician behind the Volbeat hits, also took part in the album's recording. In total, around twenty demos were selected for the album, but only eleven were chosen and ended up in the final release.

On 15 January 2020, Blind Channel revealed the album's title, cover art and track list. It had been revealed that the album would be released under Out Of Line Music in Germany and Ranka Kustannus worldwide on 6 March 2020. The title of the album is in line with the self-named Blind Channel style.

== Singles ==
The first single was the song "Over My Dead Body", officially released on 15 November 2018. A video clip was published a few days later, directed by Alexei Kulikov from the Estonian media company Vita Pictura.

On 15 March 2019, the second single, "Timebomb", was released, featuring DJ and producer Alex Mattson.

On 7 June, Blind Channel presented the third single, "Snake". The song featured Henrik Englund, best known as GG6, from the Swedish/Danish melodic metal band Amaranthe. The musicians also presented a video clip directed again by Alexei Kulikov and the Vita Pictura team.

After a long break due to a large number of performances, Blind Channel released the fourth single "Died Enough For You" on 22 November 2019. In addition, Blind Channel introduced a new style of the group – to replace the white colour in their outfits came a combination of silver and black. Thus, the group defined a new milestone in their work. The music video for the song was released on 3 April 2020.

On 3 January 2020, a fifth single, "Fever", was released. Blind Channel reported that this is the last single that they would release before the release of the album itself. The album's official release was accompanied by its final single, "Gun".

== Track listing ==
Violent Pop track listing
No.	Title	Length
1.	"Gun"	2:41
2.	"Fever"	3:00
3.	"Timebomb" (featuring Alex Mattson)	3:14
4.	"Snake" (featuring GG6)	3:05
5.	"One of Us"	3:06
6.	"Enemies with Benefits"	3:35
7.	"Love of Mine"	3:40
8.	"Feel Nothing"	3:42
9.	"Lanterns"	3:35
10.	"Over My Dead Body"	3:43
11.	"Died Enough for You"	3:16
Total length:		36:32

== Personnel ==
- Joel Hokka – vocals, guitar
- Niko Moilanen – vocals
- Joonas Porko – guitar, backing vocals
- Olli Matela – bass guitar
- Tommi Lalli – drums
- Aleksi Kaunisvesi ( Alex Mattson) - samples

== Charts ==
Chart performance for Violent Pop
Chart (2022)	Peak position
Finnish Albums (Suomen virallinen lista)	31
