= Darker than Black (disambiguation) =

Darker than Black is a 2007 anime series

It may also refer to:

- Darker Than Black Records, a music label
- "In the Veins / Darker Than Black", a song from the 1992 album Unorthodox by Edge of Sanity
- Darker Than Black, a 2003 album by Cage
- "Darker Than Black", a single from the 2016 album Revolutions by Blind Channel
