= Holocene (disambiguation) =

The Holocene is the current geological epoch.

Holocene or The Holocene may also refer to:

- The Holocene, a scientific journal
- Holocene (song), a song by Bon Iver
- Holocene (album), an album by The Ocean
- Holocene (Portland, Oregon), a nightclub in Portland, Oregon

== See also ==
- Holocene extinction
- Holocene calendar
