= Phanerozoic II: Mesozoic / Cenozoic =

2020 album by The Ocean

Studio album by the Ocean
- Released: 25 September 2020
- Genre: Post-metal; sludge metal; progressive metal; post-hardcore
- Length: 50:59
- Label: Metal Blade
- Producer: Jens Bogren

The Ocean chronology
Phanerozoic I: Palaeozoic (2018)	Phanerozoic II: Mesozoic / Cenozoic (2020)	Holocene (2023)

Phanerozoic II: Mesozoic / Cenozoic is the eighth studio album by German post-metal band the Ocean. It was released on 25 September 2020 and is the second part of a concept album series exploring the Phanerozoic geological eon, the first part being Phanerozoic I: Palaeozoic, which was released in 2018. The first two track titles each reference a period of the Mesozoic era, whereas the remaining six each reference a period of the Cenozoic era.

== Background ==
Two songs from the album were released in advance; "Jurassic | Cretaceous" which features guest vocals by Katatonia's Jonas Renkse, and "Oligocene" with its own animated music video. The video was partly shot in the Aragats mountains in Armenia during The Ocean's "Siberian Traps" tour in Summer 2019. Founding guitarist Robin Staps said, "We found this place by accident: the dilapidated ruins of a soviet observatory & research station for cosmic radiation. The building itself looked like a spaceship that had crash-landed up high in the mountains, but there were lots of interesting structures scattered across the landscape: concrete cubes, underground tunnels, rusted machinery, fallen power poles and watchtowers. It all looked like taken straight out of Andrej Tarkovsky's 'Stalker' movie."

Discussing the album's sound, Staps stated, "Phanerozoic II is more experimental, more eclectic in musical style and direction, and more varied in terms of tempos, beats, guitar work and the use of electronics. This was an intentional choice: We wanted Part I to feel rather streamlined and to have a strong cohesion between the individual songs. We wanted to create a certain vibe to linger from the first until the last note throughout the whole record. We kept the weirder, more daring and more progressive material for Part II."

In reference to the album's concept Staps explained, "Though humanity is only a very recent phenomenon in the 541 million years history of the Phanerozoic eon, the lyrics are obviously written from a human perspective. They are following Nietzsche's philosophical idea of amor fati in the light of the larger themes of Eternal Recurrence, and the inevitability of an imaginary impending collision on a planetary scale, which are the two red threads that go through Phanerozoic I and II."

Besides Jonas Renkse, another guest in this album is Tomas Hallbom, former vocalist of Swedish post-metal band Breach. Being thrilled about his involvement, Staps said, "Breach were one of the most important bands for me, not only with their milestone album Kollapse, which was basically the invention of what people refer to as post-metal nowadays long before this term was ever coined, but also It's Me God (1997) and especially Venom (1999) - they changed my view on music and guitar playing entirely. Breach were different from everything and everyone else around at that time and it's an honour to have Tomas continue the tradition to guest on our albums for the fourth time now."

Staps concluded about the future for The Ocean, "We're always striving to get out as much as we can. And as far away as we can, to bring our music and our lives to the last frontiers which remain in a world where the last square inches of free spaces have been Google-mapped to a frightening high resolution and level of detail."

== Reception ==
Professional ratings
Review scores
Source	Rating
AllMusic	4/5 stars
Blabbermouth.net	9/10 stars
Metal.de	9/10 stars
Metal Hammer	4/5 stars

Jonas Renkse's guest vocals on "Jurassic | Cretaceous" were praised specifically by several reviewers among other guests. Metal Hammer named it as the 29th best metal album of 2020.

== Track listing ==
All tracks are written by Robin Staps.

Phanerozoic II: Mesozoic / Cenozoic track listing
No.	Title	Length
1.	"Triassic"	8:31
2.	"Jurassic / Cretaceous" (featuring Jonas Renkse of Katatonia)	13:24
3.	"Palaeocene" (featuring Tomas Hallbom of Breach and The Old Wind)	4:00
4.	"Eocene"	3:57
5.	"Oligocene"	4:00
6.	"Miocene / Pliocene"	4:40
7.	"Pleistocene"	6:40
8.	"Holocene"	5:47

== Charts ==
Phanerozoic II: Mesozoic / Cenozoic chart performance
Chart (2020)	Peak position
Belgian Albums (Ultratop Flanders)	154
German Albums (Offizielle Top 100)	9
Swiss Albums (Schweizer Hitparade)	50
