= Dark Side (Blind Channel song) =

2021 single by Blind Channel

Single by Blind Channel

from the album Lifestyles of the Sick & Dangerous
- Released: 21 January 2021
- Genre: Nu metal
- Length: 2:57
- Label: Frontiers
- Songwriters: Aleksi Kaunisvesi; Joel Hokka; Joonas Porko; Niko Moilanen; Olli Matela
- Producers: Aleksi Kaunisvesi; Joonas Porko; Joel Hokka; Niko Moilanen; Joonas Parkkonen

Blind Channel singles chronology
"Left Outside Alone" (2020)	"Dark Side" (2021)	"Balboa" (2021)

Music video
- "Dark Side" on YouTube

Eurovision Song Contest 2021 entry
- Country: Finland
- Artist: Blind Channel
- Language: English
- Composers: Aleksi Kaunisvesi; Joel Hokka; Joonas Porko; Niko Moilanen; Olli Matela
- Lyricists: Aleksi Kaunisvesi; Joel Hokka; Joonas Porko; Niko Moilanen; Olli Matela

Finals performance
- Semi-final result: 5th
- Semi-final points: 234
- Final result: 6th
- Final points: 301

Entry chronology
- ◄ "Looking Back" (2020)
- "Jezebel" (2022) ►

"Dark Side" is a song by Finnish nu metal band Blind Channel. It represented Finland in the Eurovision Song Contest 2021, having won Uuden Musiikin Kilpailu 2021. It reached number one in Finland on 28 February 2021.

The song was nominated at the 2021 Global Metal Apocalypse Awards, where it finished joint 9th.

== Eurovision Song Contest ==
The song was selected to represent Finland in the Eurovision Song Contest 2021, after winning Uuden Musiikin Kilpailu 2021, the music competition that selects Finland's entries for the Eurovision Song Contest. The semi-finals of the 2021 contest featured the same line-up of countries as determined by the draw for the 2020 contest's semi-finals. Finland was placed into the second semi-final, held on 20 May 2021, and performed in the second half of the show. The song finished in 6th position in the Grand Final with 301 points, giving Finland its best result since Lordi's win in 2006 and tying 1973's Tom Tom Tom by Marion Rung as their best non-winning finish ever until 2023, when Käärijä finished in 2nd place with "Cha Cha Cha".

== Charts ==
Chart performance for "Dark Side"
Chart (2021)	Peak position
Austria (Ö3 Austria Top 40)	64
Belgium (Ultratip Bubbling Under Flanders)	1
Czech Republic Rock (IFPI)	2
Finland (Suomen virallinen lista)	1
Germany (GfK)	51
Greece International (IFPI)	17
Iceland (Tónlistinn)	10
Ireland (IRMA)	62
Lithuania (AGATA)	5
Netherlands (Single Top 100)	22
Norway (VG-lista)	27
Sweden (Sverigetopplistan)	28
Switzerland (Schweizer Hitparade)	39
UK Singles (OCC)	66
UK Indie (OCC)	11
UK Rock & Metal (OCC)	3
