= Anthropocentric (album) =

Studio album by the Ocean
- Released: 9 November 2010
- Recorded: April to December 2009
- Studios: Studio Mécanique, La Chaux-de-Fonds, Switzerland; ABC Théatre, La Chaux-de-Fonds, Switzerland; Hidden Planet Studio, Berlin, Germany; Oceanland Studios, Berlin, Germany
- Genres: Post-metal; sludge metal; progressive metal; art rock
- Length: 50:06
- Label: Metal Blade
- Producer: Robin Staps

The Ocean chronology
Heliocentric (2010)	Anthropocentric (2010)	Pelagial (2013)

Anthropocentric is the fifth studio album by German post-metal band the Ocean. It is the second album in a two-album series, following Heliocentric. Anthropocentric continues the critique of Christianity as in its companion album Heliocentric and is the band's first album to feature songwriting credits from other members aside from guitarist Robin Staps. The album was released in North America on 9 November 2010.

== Theme ==
Like its companion Heliocentric, Anthropocentric focuses on critique of Fundamentalist Christianity and Creationism. It calls into question the beliefs of "creationists" and "modern fundamentalists" who assert that "the earth is at the center of the universe" as well as the belief that the Earth is "no more than 5,000 years old." The band places focus on the concept of "man and his place in the universe". The band specified critiques of Christianity inspired by the questions of Dostoyevsky, Nietzsche and Richard Dawkins. At the base of the album are three songs with the titles "The Grand Inquisitor I, II and III". These songs have been inspired by the chapter of the same title in Fyodor Dostoyevsky's novel The Brothers Karamazov: a conversation between the brothers Ivan, an atheist, and Alyoscha, a monk. Ivan tells Alyoscha the story of a Second Coming of Christ in 16th century Sevilla. According to this parable, Jesus is arrested by the Catholic inquisition. The grand inquisitor who interrogates Jesus casts a new light on the legend of the temptation of Christ: he reproaches Jesus with having betrayed humanity and having deprived man of salvation by offering him freedom. The conversation between Ivan and Alyoscha mirrors, to some degree, the conversation between the grand inquisitor and Christ and raises more questions than it answers.

== Music ==
While Heliocentric "continues where the Proterozoic half of Precambrian left off, Anthropocentric is a "bit more straight forward" while still employing the "full range of dynamic." The band's comments on the albums reveal things about the music of the album felt "somehow heavier than Heliocentric." Describing the sound as "more dense" and "a tad more raw". The album covers a similar sonic and dynamic range as Heliocentric, also including a number of calm, acoustic moments but these are for the most part orchestrated with guitars, and not so much with piano and string section. The focus is on the heavy songs. Robin Staps comments on the production of the album stating the album "still has a very earthy, organic feel to it". Specifying, "We have spent a great deal of time on the basic sound this time around, drums, bass, guitars and vocals... and at this stage I am pretty confident that this will pay off in the end!"

== Recording ==
The albums were mainly recorded in the mountainous isolation of La Chaux-de-Fonds, Switzerland, one of the highest cities of Europe. The band decided to record and mix the album with the band's house sound engineer Julien Fehlmann. The third song on the album "She Was the Universe" was released on to the official Metal Blade Records website.

== Reception ==
Professional ratings
Review scores
Source	Rating
AllMusic	3.5/5 stars

Anthropocentric has received generally positive reviews. AllMusic gave the album 3.5/5 stars, noting the band's intent to make listening to the album an experience both for the ears and mind: "...it's possible to just let the loud guitars and thundering drums wash over you...but that's so clearly not what the band wants to happen that Anthropocentric ceases to be cathartic, like all the best metal, and starts to feel like homework."

The Australian music magazine Blunt gave the album 5/5 stars.

== Track listing ==
All music and lyrics written by Robin Staps, except where noted.

No.	Title	Music	Length
1.	"Anthropocentric"		9:24
2.	"The Grand Inquisitor I: Karamazov Baseness"		5:02
3.	"She Was the Universe"		5:39
4.	"For He That Wavereth..."	Jonathan Nido, Loïc Rossetti	2:07
5.	"The Grand Inquisitor II: Roots & Locusts"	Nido	6:33
6.	"The Grand Inquisitor III: A Tiny Grain of Faith"		1:56
7.	"Sewers of the Soul"	Louis Jucker	3:44
8.	"Wille zum Untergang"	Nido, Staps	6:03
9.	"Heaven TV"	Nido	5:04
10.	"The Almightiness Contradiction"	Nido, Staps	4:34
Total length:			50:06

== Personnel ==
=== The Ocean ===
- Luc Hess – drums
- Louis Jucker – bass, vocals
- Loïc Rossetti – vocals
- Jonathan Nido – guitars
- Robin Staps – guitars, electronics

=== Additional personnel ===
- Julien Fehlmann – sound
- Sheila Aguinaldo – vocals (track 6)
- Mitch Hertz – guitar solo (track 7)
- Esther Monnat – cello (track 10)
- Céline Portat – viola (track 10)
- Estelle Beiner – violin (track 10)
- Dalai Theofilopoulou – additional cello (track 10)
