= Lifestyles of the Sick & Dangerous =

Studio album by Blind Channel
- Released: 8 July 2022
- Genre: Nu metal
- Length: 35:22
- Label: Century Media
- Producer: Joonas Parkkonen

Blind Channel chronology
| Violent Pop (2020) | Lifestyles of the Sick & Dangerous (2022) | Exit Emotions (2024) |

Lifestyles of the Sick & Dangerous is the fourth studio album by Finnish nu metal band Blind Channel, released on 8 July 2022. The album was made without an external producer.

== Critical reception ==
Soundi awarded the album 4/5, as did V2.fi.

== Track listing ==
Lifestyles of the Sick & Dangerous track listing
| No. | Title | Length |
|---|---|---|
| 1. | "Opinions" | 3:07 |
| 2. | "Dark Side" | 2:57 |
| 3. | "Don't Fix Me" | 2:53 |
| 4. | "Bad Idea" | 3:12 |
| 5. | "Alive or Only Burning" | 3:09 |
| 6. | "Balboa" | 3:12 |
| 7. | "National Heroes" | 1:31 |
| 8. | "We Are No Saints" | 3:10 |
| 9. | "Autopsy" | 3:01 |
| 10. | "Glory for the Greedy" | 3:29 |
| 11. | "Thank You for the Pain" | 5:35 |
| Total length: | | 35:22 |

Japanese edition bonus track
| No. | Title | Length |
|---|---|---|
| 12. | "Alive or Only Burning" (featuring Zero 9:36) | 3:09 |
| Total length: | | 38:31 |

== Charts ==
Chart performance for Lifestyles of the Sick & Dangerous
| Chart (2022) | Peak position |
|---|---|
| Finnish Albums (Suomen virallinen lista) | 1 |
| German Albums (Offizielle Top 100) | 15 |
| Swiss Albums (Schweizer Hitparade) | 82 |
