= Exit Emotions =

Studio album by Blind Channel
- Released: 1 March 2024
- Recorded: 2023
- Studios: Finnvox; JXJ Music; Amat; Bloodbros
- Genres: Pop metal; nu metal
- Length: 35:15
- Label: Century Media
- Producers: Aleksi Kaunisvesi; Joonas Parkkonen

Blind Channel chronology
Lifestyles of the Sick & Dangerous (2022)	Exit Emotions (2024)	Painstream (2026)

Professional ratings
Review scores
Source	Rating
Kerrang!	4/5
Metal Hammer	3.5/5 stars
Distorted Sound	9/10 stars
V13.net	9/10

Exit Emotions is the fifth studio album by Finnish nu metal band Blind Channel, released on 1 March 2024, through Century Media Records.

== Reception ==
Reviews were mostly positive, although with a handful of notable negative reviews.

Sam Law of Kerrang rated the album four out of five, highlighting the pop influences present in the album. Danniii Leivers of Louder Sound also gave a positive review at 7/10. Another positive 7/10 review by metal-exposure.com compared the album to that of My Chemical Romance and Avenged Sevenfold. Tom Fordham of Distorted Sound gave the album 9/10, describing it as "an album that is action-packed, cathartic, and filled with earworms" and stating that the reader would "be hard pressed to find a band in nu-metal that do it better at the moment". v13.net states in a positive review that "although it contains many of the tried and tested tropes of what was delivered in the golden age of nu-metal, it still feels refreshing". Rock Overdose Greece consider Exit Emotions "[the band's] best record to date".

Negative reviews of the album dismissively compared the success of Blind Channel to that of Måneskin, also known for their popularity as a result of the Eurovision Song Contest. Joe Edwards of Boolin Tunes panned the record with a 1.5/10 review, claiming that "each track is packed with inoffensive instrumentals, designed to appease a wide radio rock audience, topped with lyricism that will be seen as comical to any sensible mind". Luke Nuttall, in an only slightly more positive review, considered the album an improvement over Lifestyles of the Sick & Dangerous, but was otherwise unimpressed.

== Track listing ==
Exit Emotions track listing
No.	Title	Length
1.	"Where's the Exit?"	2:41
2.	"Deadzone"	2:58
3.	"Wolves in California"	2:42
4.	"XOXO" (featuring From Ashes to New)	2:54
5.	"Keeping It Surreal"	2:55
6.	"Die Another Day" (featuring RØRY)	3:02
7.	"Phobia"	2:46
8.	"Happy Doomsday"	2:53
9.	"Red Tail Lights"	2:42
10.	"Not Your Bro"	3:10
11.	"Flatline"	2:54
12.	"One Last Time... Again"	3:58
Total length:		35:15

Japanese edition bonus tracks
No.	Title	Length
13.	"Alive or Only Burning" (Live at Helsinki Ice Hall)	3:28
14.	"We Are No Saints" (Live at Helsinki Ice Hall)	3:48
Total length:		42:33

== Personnel ==
Blind Channel

- Joel Hokka – vocals
- Niko Moilanen – vocals
- Joonas Porko – guitar
- Olli Matela – bass
- Tommi Lalli – drums
- Aleksi Kaunisvesi – DJ and keyboards/samples

Other

- Joonas Parkkonen – production
- Aleksi Kaunisvesi – production
- Blyne – production on "Flatline"
- Dan Lancaster – production on "Keeping It Surreal" and "Phobia", mixing
- Matt Brandyberry – production on "XOXO"
- Danny Case – production on "XOXO"
- Zakk Cervini – mixing
- Ted Jensen – mastering
- Christian Ripkens – photography for back of booklet
- Nathan James – photography for interior of booklet
- Olli Matela – album cover
- Ossi Morko – album cover

== Charts ==
Chart performance for Exit Emotions
Chart (2024)	Peak position
Finnish Albums (Suomen virallinen lista)	1
