= Pelagial =

Studio album by the Ocean
- Released: 26 April 2013
- Recorded: January 2012 – January 2013
- Genres: Progressive metal; post-metal; sludge metal
- Length: 53:13
- Label: Metal Blade
- Producers: Robin Staps; Jens Bogren

The Ocean chronology
Anthropocentric (2010)	Pelagial (2013)	Phanerozoic I: Palaeozoic (2018)

Pelagial is the sixth studio album by German post-metal band the Ocean. It is a concept album with the track titles referencing, in descending fashion, the oceanic depth zones. Musically, the concept is explored by sequencing the music such that it is increasingly dark and claustrophobic in emulation of the diminishing light and increasing pressure that comes with oceanic descent. The album was initially conceived as an instrumental release, although vocals were subsequently added; the band has made both versions available.

Pelagial was released in Germany on 26 April 2013, in Europe on 29 April, and in North America on 30 April. The album entered the German Album Chart at No. 68 and is the band's first charting album.

== Concept ==
The concept of Pelagial is multi-dimensional. The first, most literal, level involves a journey from the surface to the lowest depth zone of the ocean, with the album's movements getting progressively darker and more claustrophobic to mimic the diminishing light and increasing atmospheric pressure. However, at a second, allegorical level, the ocean layers serve as an extended metaphor for a journey into the inner depths of the psyche. Guitarist and songwriter Robin Staps described this aspect of Pelagial as a movement "towards the essence and origins of our desires, wishes, dreams, and all the fucked up attributes inside of our own inner selves that generate and shape them" and said that there are "a lot of Freud-like references" in the lyrics and song titles.

Pelagial was written as a single piece of music in order to fit the concept of a journey through the depth zones of the ocean. However, according to Staps, it was separated into 11 tracks to "make certain sections accessible". The concept was further elaborated musically through the use of samples from old submarine movies, which The Ocean used to imbue the songs with a similar "claustrophobic atmosphere". Staps, referencing the German film Das Boot as exemplary of the genre, said of the old submarine movies:

"They all play with the same elements of claustrophobia and there's always the same plot happening, basically the submarine diving a little deeper than they're allowed to, all the creaking and crackling and the water coming in and leaking into the submarine shell. The water bumps and people are sitting there in tension and hoping not to get hit. This kind of atmosphere was something I really wanted to create with this album for the deeper parts of the journey... It was only an obvious step to decide to use those original samples to underline and enhance the atmosphere... There is a lot of bubbling, lots of background underwater sounds that are partially taken from movies and partially from other sources."

Staps described the sampling technique used on Pelagial as "very subliminal" and suggested that the instrumental version of the album will make the samples more apparent due to the absence of vocals and the alternate mix.

The lyrics are inspired by and make reference to Andrei Tarkovsky's 1979 science fiction film Stalker.

== Vocals ==
Pelagial was initially conceived as an instrumental album. Robin Staps explained in September 2012, while the album was still under development, that Pelagial would be largely or entirely instrumental. "The reasons are manifold, but there simply is no space on this album, both from a musical as well as from a conceptual point of view, for lyrics and vocals. Loïc [Rossetti] is going to continue to be our vocalist, but the time is now right for instrumental metal. We need more of this."

Subsequent to the band recording the instrumental album, it was announced that Rossetti had recently recovered from a disorder affecting his voice and would indeed contribute vocals to Pelagial. Some editions of the album include a second disc featuring the all-instrumental version of Pelagial with an alternate mix. Guitarist Jona Nido later explained the band's reversal: "Loïc is the frontman of this band and we all felt that The Ocean and this album needed him... I'm glad we decided to record vocals in the end, because it really adds a new dimension to the album that was not there before." Staps later said that Rossetti's vocal health was "part of the reason we decided to have it instrumental originally". He confirmed that part of the logic for releasing both the vocal and instrumental versions of the album was that the band can shift to an instrumental configuration for live performances if Rossetti's health problems return.

== Video ==
The limited-edition version of Pelagial comes with a DVD movie made by Craig Murray, which Staps described as "basically a massive video clip." The video was designed to enhance the experience of the Dolby 5.1 surround sound mix included with the limited-edition version. The movie, which will also be incorporated into the visuals for the band's live show, features a female protagonist who embodies the psychological aspects of the lyrics for Pelagial.

== Reception ==
Professional ratings
Review scores
Source	Rating
About.com	4.5/5 stars
Axis of Metal	10/10 stars
Blabbermouth.net	9.5/10 stars
CraveOnline	7/10 stars
Decibel	8/10 stars
Exclaim!	8/10 stars
Jukebox:Metal	5/5 stars
MetalSucks	5/5 stars
The Monolith	9.4/10 stars
Muzik Dizcovery	(A)
Scratch the Surface	8.5/10 stars
Sputnikmusic	3.5/5 stars
AllMusic	4/5 stars

Pelagial has received almost universal acclaim, with About.com describing it as "a stunning collection of ideas and emotions" and Axis of Metal predicting that it would be a contender for album of the year in 2013. The Monolith added that the album represented a marked progression from the band's previous releases, Heliocentric and Anthropocentric.

However, the album has also garnered some criticism. CraveOnline.com described the album as lacking in soul and incapable of making an emotional connection with the listener. Blabbermouth took a contrary position and described the album as an "emotional leviathan". Some publications wrote of a disjunction between the vocals and the instruments due to the nature of the recording. Scratch the Surface praised the band's decision to include both the vocal and instrumental versions of the album so as to offer both experiences to the audience.

== Track listing ==
All lyrics are written by Robin Staps; all music is composed by Robin Staps.

No.	Title	Length
1.	"Epipelagic"	1:12
2.	"Mesopelagic: Into the Uncanny"	5:56
3.	"Bathyalpelagic I: Impasses"	4:24
4.	"Bathyalpelagic II: The Wish in Dreams"	3:18
5.	"Bathyalpelagic III: Disequilibrated"	4:27
6.	"Abyssopelagic I: Boundless Vasts"	3:27
7.	"Abyssopelagic II: Signals of Anxiety"	5:05
8.	"Hadopelagic I: Omen of the Deep"	1:07
9.	"Hadopelagic II: Let Them Believe"	9:17
10.	"Demersal: Cognitive Dissonance"	9:05
11.	"Benthic: The Origin of Our Wishes"	5:55
Total length:		52:13

== Personnel ==
=== Band ===
- Louis Jucker – bass
- Chris Breuer – bass
- Luc Hess – drums
- Jona Nido – guitars
- Robin Staps – guitars, samples
- Loïc Rossetti – vocals

=== Guest and studio musicians ===
- Vincent Membrez – keyboards
- Tomas Hallbom - guest vocals on "Bathyalpelagic III: Disequilibrated" and "Demersal: Cognitive Dissonance"
- Mitch Hertz - guitar solo on "Bathyalpelagic III: Disequilibrated"
- Philippe Glandien - additional strings, piano arrangements, and scores
- Regula Schwab - violin
- Isabella Gottraux - viola
- Catherine Vay - cello

=== Production ===
- Jens Bogren - mastering, mixing, production
- Robin Staps - production

=== Art ===
- Seldon Hunt - design for limited edition digipak and gatefold vinyl versions
- Martin Kvamme - design for regular CD and vinyl box set versions
- Marcel Schulz - design for booklet
- Craig Murray - photography and film
- Robin Staps - photography
- Arielle De Lucy - model for art and film
