= Precambrian (album) =

Studio album by the Ocean
- Released: 5 November 2007
- Recorded: April to July 2007
- Studios: Oceanland, Berlin
- Genres: Post-metal; sludge metal; progressive metal; extreme metal; doom metal
- Length: 83:52
- Label: Metal Blade
- Producers: Jonas Olsson, Robin Staps

The Ocean chronology
Aeolian (2006)	Precambrian (2007)	Heliocentric (2010)

Professional ratings
Review scores
Source	Rating
About.com	4/5 stars
AllMusic	4/5 stars
Blistering Media	Positive
Pitchfork	(8.3/10)
Revolver	4/5 stars

Precambrian is the third studio album by German post-metal band the Ocean, released on 5 November 2007 through Metal Blade Records. It features several guest musicians, including Caleb Scofield (Cave In, Zozobra, Old Man Gloom), Nate Newton (Converge, Doomriders), Dwid Hellion (Integrity), Tomas Hallbom (Breach), Erik Kalsbeek (Textures) and musicians from the Berlin Philharmonic Orchestra.

== Development ==
The main concept of the album is based around the Precambrian, an early period in the formation of Earth. Hadean/Archaean (disc one) is heavy and raw just like their previous album Aeolian while Proterozoic (disc two) is more post-metal-influenced with the inclusion of symphonic and electronic elements like their first album Fluxion.

The production of the album lasted more than six months after their tour in Europe in late 2006. All the drum tracks done by Torge Liessmann and most of the guitar tracks were recorded at Studio57, near Kokkola, Finland, where producer Jonas Olsson had also recorded and produced Callisto's album Noir. Some of the guitar tracks and all of the vocals, bass guitar, percussion, samples, and various instruments played by the Berlin Philharmonic Orchestra were recorded in The Ocean's own Oceanland Studio in Berlin, Germany. Additional vocals were recorded in Sweden, Belgium, the Netherlands, and Los Angeles, California and Seattle, Washington in the United States. It was mixed by Andrew Schneider in New York City. The album's mastering was originally done by Nick Zampiello, but dissatisfied Robin Staps, and it was therefore remastered in Finland. The artwork was done by Martin Kvamme, who has done artwork for various Mike Patton projects like Fantômas and Tomahawk. The release in the United States and Europe differed; the U.S. version is in a two-disc crystal case while the European version is in a complex digipak case with additional artwork.

Jonas Renkse from Katatonia and Bloodbath was planned to be on the album, but due to Katatonia's touring schedule during the production, The Ocean was not able to approach him on time. The Ocean wanted to have Dave Verellen of Botch to participate, but he never responded during production.

== Track listing ==
All music written by Robin Staps. Lyrics written by Robin Staps except where noted. All non-instrumental songs include sub-titles that correspond to the lyrics provided, not to the main concept.

Disc 1 : "Hadean/Archaean"
No.	Title	Length
1.	"Hadean: The Long March of the Yes-Men"	3:48
2.	"Eoarchaean: The Great Void"	4:46
3.	"Palaeoarchaean: Man and the Sea"	2:46
4.	"Mesoarchaean: Legions of Winged Octopi"	5:20
5.	"Neoarchaean: To Burn the Duck of Doubt"	5:24
Total length:		22:04

Disc 2: "Proterozoic"
No.	Title	Length
1.	"Siderian"	1:57
2.	"Rhyacian: Untimely Meditations"	10:57
3.	"Orosirian: For the Great Blue Cold Now Reigns"	6:29
4.	"Statherian"	5:58
5.	"Calymmian: Lake Disappointment"	8:19
6.	"Ectasian: De Profundis"	8:58
7.	"Stenian: Mount Sorrow"	8:20
8.	"Tonian: Confessions of a Dangerous Mind"	7:18
9.	"Cryogenian"	3:32
Total length:		61:48

== Personnel ==
Hadean/Archaean

The Ocean

- Torge Ließmann – drums, percussion (all tracks)
- Robin Staps – guitar, percussion (all tracks)
- Matt Beels – guitar (all tracks)
- Mike Pilat – bass (all tracks), vocals (tracks 1, 2, 3, 5)
- Nico Webers – vocals (tracks 1, 2, 3)
- Meta – vocals (tracks 1, 5)

Additional musicians

- Jason Emry – guest vocals (track 3)
- Eric Kalsbeek – guest vocals (track 4)
- Nate Newton – guest vocals (track 3)
- René Noçon – guest vocals (track 3)
- Walid Farruque – guest guitar (track 2)

Proterozoic

The Ocean

- Torge Ließmann – drums, percussion (all tracks)
- Robin Staps – guitar (all tracks), clean vocals (tracks 2, 6, 7)
- Matt Beels – guitar (all tracks)
- Mike Pilat – bass (tracks 2, 3, 5, 6, 7), vocals (tracks 2, 3, 6, 8)
- Hannes Huefken – bass (tracks 4 and 8)
- Nico Webers – vocals (tracks 2, 5, 8)
- Meta – vocals (tracks 2, 3, 5, 6, 7, 8)

Additional Musicians

- René Noçon – guest clean vocals (tracks 3, 7, 8)
- Tomas Hallbom – guest vocals (track 7)
- Dwid Hellion – guest vocals (track 6)
- Nate Newton – guest vocals (track 8)
- Jan Oberg – guest vocals (track 6)
- Caleb Scofield – guest vocals (track 3)
- Jonathan Heine – guest bass (track 6)
- Stefan Heinemeyer – guest cello (tracks 2, 4, 5, 6, 7, 9)
- Karina Suslov – guest viola (tracks 2, 3, 4, 5, 6, 7, 8, 9)
- Christoph Von Der Nahmer – guest violin (tracks 2, 3, 4, 8)
- Katharina Sellheim – guest piano (tracks 2, 6, 7, 8, 9)
- John Gürtler – guest saxophone (track 1)
- Daniel Eichholz – guest glockenspiel (tracks 2, 3, 4, 5, 7)
- Jonas Olsson – guest tambourine (tracks 5, 7, 8)
- Tomas Svensson – additional samples (track 1)
