= The Ocean (band) =

German post-metal band

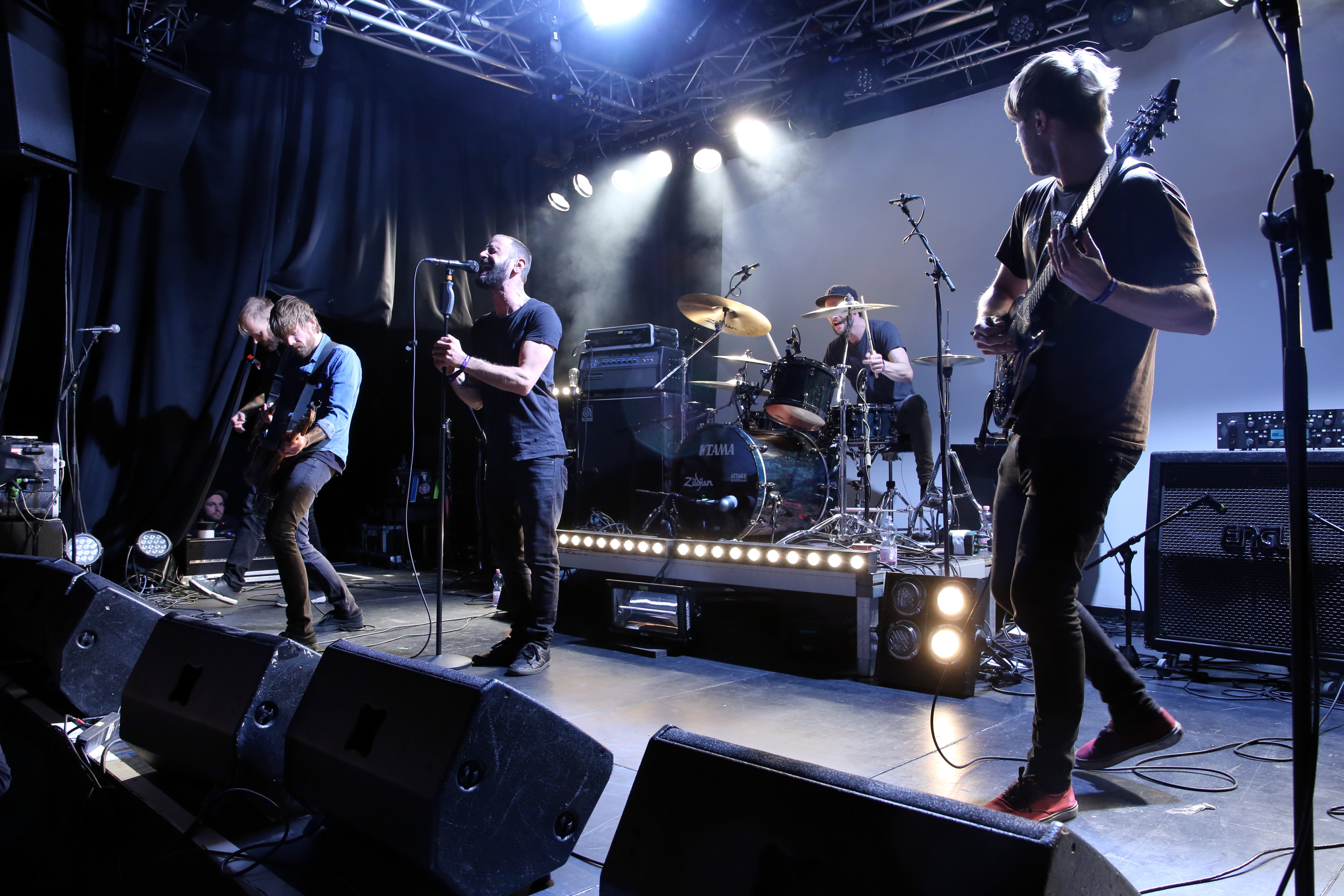
- The Ocean performing in 2017

Background information
- Also known as: The Ocean Collective
- Origin: Berlin, Germany
- Genres: Post-metal; progressive metal; sludge metal; extreme metal; avant-garde metal
- Years active: 2001–present
- Labels: Pelagic Records; Metal Blade; Make My Day; Throne
- Members: Robin Staps; Mattias Hägerstrand; Jordi Farré; Enrico Tiberi; Lane Shi; Emmanuel Jessua; Marco Gennaro
- Past members: See list of The Ocean band members
- Website: theoceancollective.com

The Ocean (also known as the Ocean Collective) is a German post-metal band formed in 2001 by German guitarist Robin Staps.

== History ==
=== Formation and early releases ===
The Ocean was founded in 2001 by guitarist and songwriter Robin Staps. During the following two years, about 40 musicians joined and left the band until a stable line-up was established. July 2002 saw The Ocean play their first concert at Berlin's now defunct semi-legal Eimer Club. Shortly after, the band released their eponymous demo Islands/Tides, a 30-minute-long song that also constituted the substance of their early live shows.

After a brief tour with Swedish crust punk outfit Coma in early 2003, the band signed to Make My Day Records, which then released their commercial release Fogdiver on 1 September 2003; consisting of five songs, this is an instrumental record, despite the fact that on stage at least two singers could be found. Unlike its predecessor, this recording received considerable acclaim from critics throughout a variety of genres.

=== Fluxion and Aeolian ===
During winter and spring 2004, The Ocean recorded what was to become the material for their two following albums. The calmer and more atmospheric half of this recording session was released as Fluxion in August 2004; a joint effort of Make My Day and Throne Records. While the addition of vocalist Meta seemed to make the music more accessible to some, it also caused many other critics to consider the album a step backwards in terms of innovation and originality compared to the instrumental Fogdiver. In interviews, the band would comment on this by pointing out the perceived closed-mindedness of some of the reviewers and their supposed inability to deal with the harshness and brutality of the anti-Christian, anti-theistic vocals now added to The Ocean's sound.

After signing to Metal Blade Records in summer 2005, all the remaining songs from the session were released as Aeolian. Since Fluxion and Aeolian had originally been planned as a double CD with a mellow and a brutal part — a plan that did not work out — Aeolian came across as very different from its predecessor. Unlike on previous albums, classical instruments and electronic sounds were hardly used here, making the record sound rather minimalistic. But whereas Fluxion had featured only one singer, seven of them could be found on Aeolian, among them Nate Newton, Sean Ingram, and Tomas Hallbom, whose names were also used extensively for the album's promotion campaign. According to the band, Meta's voice on Fluxion had created a monotony that was to be avoided on Aeolian, which also resulted in the addition of second vocalist Nico Webers. March 2006 saw the North American release of the album. Later that year, a joint vinyl version of Fluxion and Aeolian was released by Throne Records, featuring three records in different colors. During this time, vocalist Meta left the band and was replaced by Mike Pilat.

=== Precambrian and lineup changes ===
In late 2007, they released a new two-disc album entitled Precambrian. A few months later Nico Webers left to join War from a Harlots Mouth, leaving Mike Pilat as the band's sole vocalist. In April 2008, The Ocean embarked on a year-long tour through Europe and North America with bands like Intronaut, Opeth, and At the Gates. In April 2009 it was announced that lead vocalist Mike Pilat was leaving the band for personal reasons and other commitments.

=== Heliocentric and Anthropocentric ===
On 17 November 2009, Robin Staps announced that a replacement vocalist had been found, Loïc Rossetti. The Ocean released two albums in 2010, Heliocentric on 9 April and Anthropocentric on 9 November. Taken together, the two albums "represent a fundamental and philosophical critique of Christianity," with Heliocentric describing the internal battles within the Catholic Church over the heliocentrism of Copernicus and Galileo, and Anthropocentric critiquing the fundamentalist Protestant view of Creationism.

=== Pelagial ===
They announced that their first live DVD would be filmed on 29 January 2011 in Berlin at the Museum für Musikinstrumente and will only contain tracks from their album Precambrian. On 3 August 2011, The Ocean announced via its Facebook page that Robin Staps had been working on new material for an upcoming album. They stated that recording would get under way in early 2012 and hinted at the possibility of releasing another double album. In a September 2012 article on the website MetalSucks, Robin stated that the new album was due for an April or May release in 2013 and would have very few if any vocals, but elaborated that Loïc remains the vocalist of the group despite the change in style.

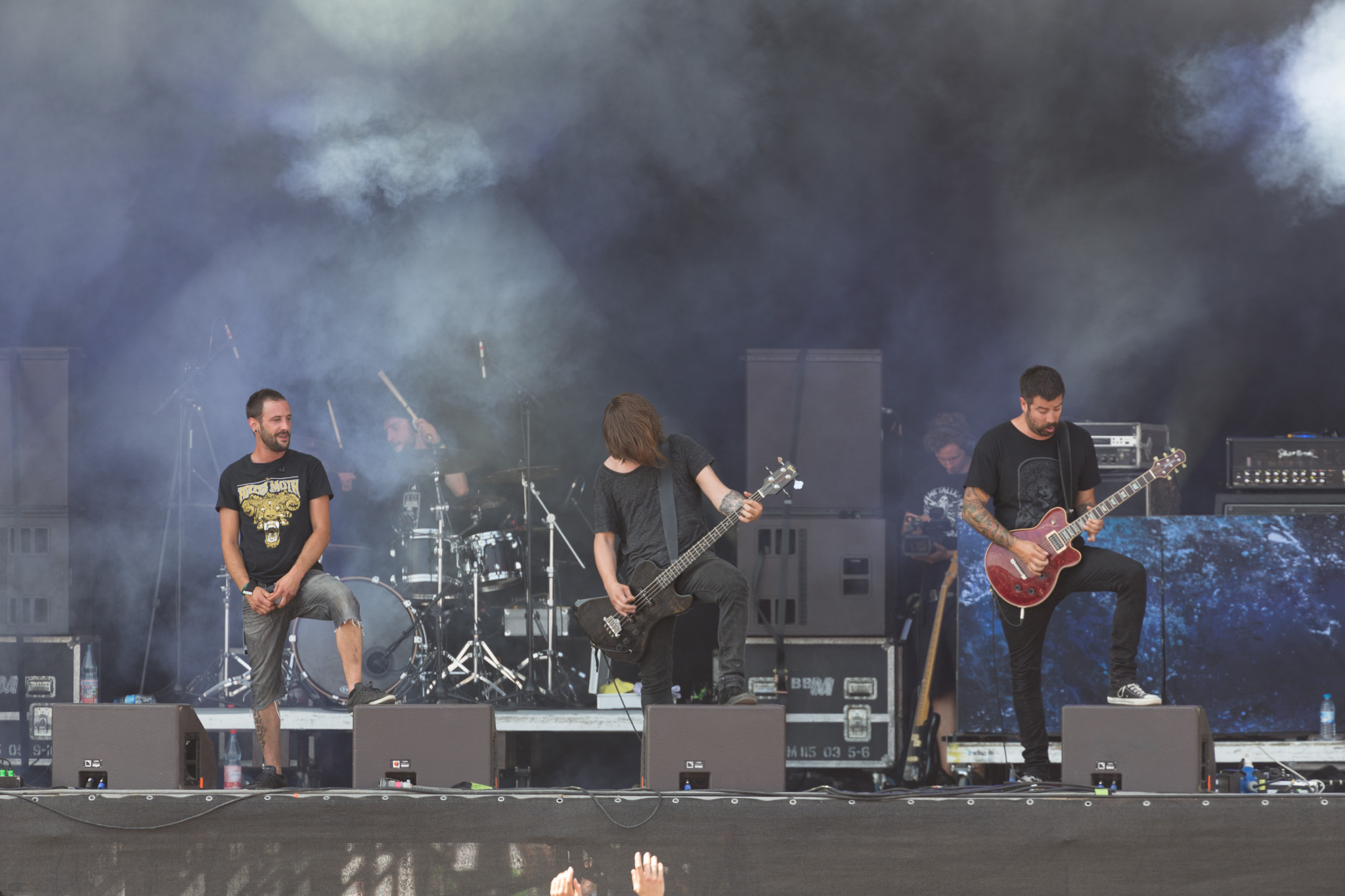
The Ocean performing at With Full Force 2014

The band released Pelagial on 29 April 2013 in the United States. The CD version contained two discs – one has the songs with vocals, the other is purely instrumental. On 20 October 2013, the band announced the departure of guitarist Jonathan Nido and drummer Luc Hess. It was later announced that Paul Seidel of the band War from a Harlots Mouth would replace Hess after the current tour. Additionally, on 8 December it was announced via the band's Facebook page that Australian Damian Murdoch would be the band's new guitarist.

=== Phanerozoic ===
On 14 February 2018, a photo was posted on the Instagram account of the band, depicting a recording studio. Three days later, another picture reached the surface stating that the "phanerozoic" recordings are in progress at the Sundlaugin studios in Iceland. 22 August 2018, the band announced on their Instagram, that the new album will be split in two. Phanerozoic I: Palaeozoic was released on 2 November 2018 while Phanerozoic II was expected to be released in 2019, but was postponed to 2020. These albums will respectively be the band's seventh and eighth studio albums, and are the conceptual successors to the album Precambrian. In November 2019 the band was quoted to be "wrapping up recording and will begin mixing at Fascination Street Studios in December". They announced that the album name would Phanerozoic II: Mesozoic & Cenozoic, which started speculations that it might be a double album. These rumors proved false, and Phanerozoic II: Mesozoic & Cenozoic was released 25 September 2020.

On 21 September 2020, the fossil brittle star Ophiacantha oceani was named in honor of the band.

=== Holocene and the End of an Eon tour ===
On 17 January 2023, the Ocean released the single "Preboreal" along with a music video. On February 6, the band announced they would be releasing a new album, Holocene, on 19 May 2023 and also revealed the album's cover artwork. The album's second single and music video, "Parabiosis", was released on February 16. A third single, "Sea of Reeds", was released on 20 March along with the album's track list. The album's fourth and final single, "Subatlantic", was released on 19 April.

On 18 September 2024, the band announced the "End of an Eon" tour that will take place through mainland Europe from December 2024 to February 2025. These were to be the group's final shows with the current lineup, though it was not announced who would be departing and who would remain following the tour's conclusion. These were later revealed to be Paul Seidel, Loïc Rossetti, and David Ramis Åhfeldt.

=== Solaris and lineup changes ===
On 3 January 2026, the Ocean Collective announced their return from hiatus, noting that they were in the process of finishing recording for nearly an hour of new music, with a twelfth album expected to release later in 2026.

On 26 May 2026, the Ocean teased the release of new music. The song was later revealed to be titled "Light Pollution" and was released on May 28th. The release came along with the announcement of a new album Solaris, scheduled for release on 25th of September, 2026, and the addition of four new members. Enrico Tiberi and Lane Shi on vocals, together with new guitarists Emmanuel Jessua and Marco Gennaro.

The Ocean released "Belligerence" on the 14th of July 2026 as the second single of their new album. "Ultima Esperanza" and "Milk of my Dreams", the third and fourth singles, were released on the 1st and 17th of September 2026, respectively.

== Musical style ==
Their musical style has been described by different sources as post-metal, progressive metal, sludge metal, extreme metal, and avant-garde metal.

== Members ==
The Ocean has had many different line-ups since its inception in 2001. Sometimes the band is known as The Ocean Collective as it features a revolving cast of members and (long-time) collaborators, centered around guitarist and composer Robin Staps.

=== Current ===
- Robin Staps – guitars, programming, backing vocals (2001–present)
- Mattias Hägerstrand – bass (2015–present)
- Jordi Farré – drums (2025–present)
- Lane Shi – female vocals (2026–present)
- Enrico Tiberi – male vocals (2026–present)
- Emmanuel Jessua – guitars (2026–present)
- Marco Gennaro – guitars (2026–present)

== Discography ==
=== Studio albums ===
- Fogdiver (2003)
- Fluxion (2004)
- Aeolian (2006)
- Precambrian (2007)
- Heliocentric (2010)
- Anthropocentric (2010)
- Pelagial (2013)
- Phanerozoic I: Palaeozoic (2018)
- Phanerozoic II: Mesozoic / Cenozoic (2020)
- Holocene (2023)
- Solaris (2026)

=== Other releases ===
- The Ocean (demo, 2001)
- Burst/The Ocean (7" split, 2005)
- The Grand Inquisitor (10" EP, 2012)
- Transcendental (split EP, 2015)
- Phanerozoic Live (live album, 2021)
- Boreal/Traum (with Sierra, 7" split, 2025)

=== Music videos ===
Year	Song	Album
2005	"Dead on the Whole"	Fluxion
2005	"One with the Ocean"	Aeolian
2006	"Queen of the Food-Chain"	Aeolian
2010	"Firmament"	Heliocentric
2011	"The Grand Inquisitor II: Roots & Locusts"	Anthropocentric
2013	"Bathyalpelagic II: The Wish in Dreams"	Pelagial
2018	"Cambrian II: Eternal Recurrence"	Phanerozoic I: Palaeozoic
2019	"Permian: The Great Dying"	Phanerozoic I: Palaeozoic
2020	"Oligocene"	Phanerozoic II: Mesozoic / Cenozoic
2020	"Pleistocene"	Phanerozoic II: Mesozoic / Cenozoic
2023	"Preboreal"	Holocene
2023	"Parabiosis"	Holocene
2023	"Sea of Reeds"	Holocene
2023	"Subatlantic"	Holocene
2024	"Unconformities" (featuring Karin Park)	Holocene
2026	"Light Pollution"	Solaris
2026	"Ultima Esperanza"	Solaris
