= Aeolian (album) =

Studio album by the Ocean
- Released: 7 March 2006
- Recorded: January 2004 to July 2005
- Studio: Oceanland Studios in Berlin
- Genre: Sludge metal; progressive metal; extreme metal; metalcore
- Length: 53:03
- Label: Metal Blade
- Producer: Robin Staps, Magnus Lindberg

The Ocean chronology
Fluxion (2004)	Aeolian (2006)	Precambrian (2007)

Singles from Aeolian
- 1. "Queen of the Food-Chain" / "Inertia" Released: October 2005

Professional ratings
Review scores
Source	Rating
AllMusic	3/5 stars
Blabbermouth.net	7/10
Kerrang!	4/5 stars
PopMatters	6/10
Revolver	5/5 stars

Aeolian is the second studio album by German post-metal band the Ocean. It was released on 7 March 2006 through Metal Blade Records.

== About ==
Aeolian is the second part of a two-CD project that started with Fluxion. Whereas Fluxion had a focus on atmosphere and orchestral sounds, Aeolian focuses more on the band's hardcore and metal influences. The two albums were originally intended to be released together as a double CD, but this was cancelled due to financial reasons.

An animated music video was created for the song "One with the Ocean".

== Track listing ==
All tracks are written by Robin Staps. Lyrics to "The City in the Sea" are based on the poem of the same name by Edgar Allan Poe.

No.	Title	Length
1.	"The City in the Sea"	7:33
2.	"Dead Serious & Highly Professional"	1:28
3.	"Austerity"	9:40
4.	"Killing the Flies"	7:14
5.	"Une saison en enfer"	4:58
6.	"Necrobabes.com"	2:14
7.	"One with the Ocean"	2:35
8.	"Swoon"	5:00
9.	"Queen of the Food-Chain"	7:11
10.	"Inertia"	5:10
Total length:		53:03

== Personnel ==
The Ocean

- Robin Staps – guitar, programming
- Jonathan Heine – bass
- Torge Ließmann – drums
- Gerd Kornmann – percussion, tools

Vocalists

- Meta – meaty howls
- Nico Webers – high-pitched shrieking
- Tomas Hallbom – Scandinavian hollering
- Sean Ingram – deep bellowing
- Nate Newton – raucous vociferation
- Ercüment Kasalar – sappy squalling
- Carsten Albrecht – plangent yelling

Additional live musicians

- Andreas Willebrand – guitars
- Gordon Hünies – bass
- Yuky Ryang – cello
- Nils Lindenhayn – visuals
