= Phanerozoic I: Palaeozoic =

Studio album by the Ocean
- Released: 2 November 2018
- Studios: Sundlaugin Studio; Hidden Planet Studios; Christoph Kokos Studios
- Genres: Progressive metal; post-metal; sludge metal
- Length: 47:45
- Label: Metal Blade
- Producers: Jens Bogren; Tony Lindgren

The Ocean chronology
Pelagial (2013)	Phanerozoic I: Palaeozoic (2018)	Phanerozoic II: Mesozoic / Cenozoic (2020)

Phanerozoic I: Palaeozoic is the seventh studio album by German post-metal band the Ocean. It is a concept album exploring the Phanerozoic geological eon, with each track title referencing a period of the Paleozoic era. Phanerozoic I: Palaeozoic was released worldwide on 2 November 2018. It is the first of two volumes; the latter, Phanerozoic II: Mesozoic / Cenozoic, was released separately in 2020.

== Reception ==
Professional ratings
Review scores
Source	Rating
AllMusic	4/5 stars
Blabbermouth.net	8.5/10 stars
Metal.de	9/10 stars
Sputnikmusic	4/5 stars

The album was released to critical acclaim. "Devonian: Nascent" was selected by Loudwire as one of the top metal songs of 2018; Jonas Renkse's guest vocals on this track were praised specifically by several reviewers.

== Track listing ==
All tracks are written by Robin Staps

No.	Title	Length
1.	"The Cambrian Explosion"	1:55
2.	"Cambrian II: Eternal Recurrence"	7:52
3.	"Ordovicium: The Glaciation of Gondwana"	4:49
4.	"Silurian: Age of Sea Scorpions"	9:36
5.	"Devonian: Nascent" (featuring Jonas Renkse of Katatonia)	11:05
6.	"The Carboniferous: Rainforest Collapse"	3:09
7.	"Permian: The Great Dying"	9:22

== Charts ==
Chart (2018)	Peak position
German Albums (Offizielle Top 100)	41
