= Blind Channel =

Finnish nu metal band

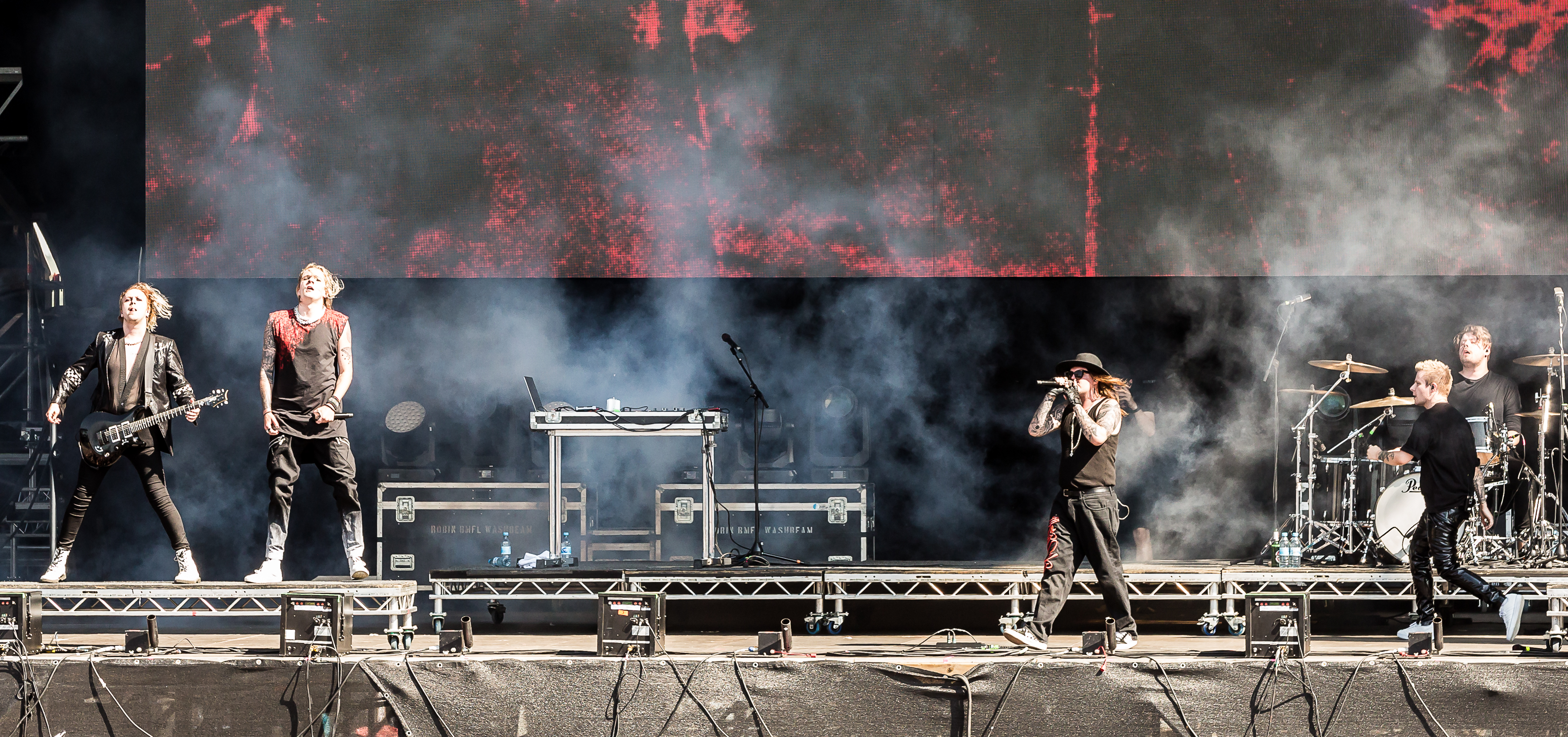
- Blind Channel at Full Force 2023

Background information
- Origin: Oulu, Finland
- Genre: Nu metal
- Years active: 2013–2024; 2026–present
- Labels: Frontiers; Sony; Century Media
- Members: Niko Moilanen; Joonas Porko; Olli Matela; Tommi Lalli; Aleksi Kaunisvesi
- Past members: Joel Hokka
- Website: www.blindchannelofficial.com

Blind Channel is a Finnish nu metal band from Oulu. They represented Finland in the Eurovision Song Contest 2021 with the song "Dark Side", finishing in sixth place. The band define their musical style as "violent pop".

== Career ==
In February 2021, the band participated in the Finnish national selection for the Eurovision Song Contest 2021 with the modern nu-metal track "Dark Side". They won the selection with 54.3% of the vote (the highest in UMK history) and in May 2021 represented Finland in the contest in Rotterdam, Netherlands, finishing in sixth place with a total of 301 points. Blind Channel received 218 of their total points from televoting, while 83 points were received from juries. The band painted their middle fingers red for their Eurovision performance of "Dark Side", after being informed that they could not lift a middle finger to the audience onstage due to the show's family-friendly nature. On 19 May 2021, a day before their first performance at Eurovision, the band signed to Century Media/Sony Music. On 7 October 2024, the band announced that they would be going on indefinite hiatus. On 26 April 2025, Joel Hokka announced he would not be returning to the band, citing insomnia issues.

On 5 August 2026, the band announced their return from their hiatus, and revealed their upcoming album, Painstream, which was released on 30 October.

== Band members ==
=== Current ===
- Niko Moilanen – vocals (2013–2024, 2026–present)
- Joonas Porko – guitar (2013–2024, 2026–present)
- Olli Matela – bass (2013–2024, 2026–present)
- Tommi Lalli – drums (2013–2024, 2026–present)
- Aleksi Kaunisvesi – DJ, samples, percussion (2020–2024, 2026–present)

=== Former ===
- Joel Hokka – vocals, guitar (2013–2024)

== Discography ==
=== Albums ===
Title	Details	Peak chart positions
Title	Details	FIN
Revolutions	Released: 29 September 2016; Label: Ranka Kustannus; Format: Digital download, CD, streaming	26
Blood Brothers	Released: 20 April 2018; Label: Ranka Kustannus; Format: Digital download, CD, LP, streaming	30
Violent Pop	Released: 6 March 2020; Label: Ranka Kustannus; Format: Digital download, CD, streaming	31
Lifestyles of the Sick & Dangerous	Released: 8 July 2022; Label: Century Media; Format: Digital download, CD, LP, streaming	1
Exit Emotions	Released: 1 March 2024; Label: Century Media; Format: Digital download, CD, LP, streaming	1
Painstream	Released: 30 October 2026; Label: Century Media; Format: Digital download, CD, LP, streaming	5

=== Singles ===
Singles as lead artist
Title	Year	Peak chart positions								Album
Title	Year	FIN	GER	IRE	NLD	NOR	SWE	UK	US Main	Album
"Save Me"	2013	—	—	—	—	—	—	—	—	Non-album singles
"Naysayers"	2014	—	—	—	—	—	—	—	—	Non-album singles
"Calling Out"	2014	—	—	—	—	—	—	—	—	Non-album singles
"Unforgiving"	2015	—	—	—	—	—	—	—	—	Revolutions
"Don't"	2015	—	—	—	—	—	—	—	—	Revolutions
"Darker Than Black"	2016	—	—	—	—	—	—	—	—	Revolutions
"Deja Fu"	2016	—	—	—	—	—	—	—	—	Revolutions
"Enemy for Me"	2016	—	—	—	—	—	—	—	—	Revolutions
"Can't Hold Us"	2017	—	—	—	—	—	—	—	—	Non-album single
"Alone Against All"	2017	—	—	—	—	—	—	—	—	Blood Brothers
"Sharks Love Blood"	2017	—	—	—	—	—	—	—	—	Blood Brothers
"Wolfpack"	2018	—	—	—	—	—	—	—	—	Blood Brothers
"Out of Town"	2018	—	—	—	—	—	—	—	—	Blood Brothers
"Over My Dead Body"	2018	—	—	—	—	—	—	—	—	Violent Pop
"Timebomb" (featuring Alex Mattson)	2019	—	—	—	—	—	—	—	—	Violent Pop
"Snake" (featuring GG6)	2019	—	—	—	—	—	—	—	—	Violent Pop
"Died Enough for You"	2019	—	—	—	—	—	—	—	—	Violent Pop
"Fever"	2020	—	—	—	—	—	—	—	—	Violent Pop
"Gun"	2020	—	—	—	—	—	—	—	—	Violent Pop
"Left Outside Alone"	2020	—	—	—	—	—	—	—	—	Non-album single
"Dark Side"	2021	1	51	62	22	27	28	66	–	Lifestyles of the Sick & Dangerous
"Balboa"	2021	12	—	—	—	—	—	—	—	Lifestyles of the Sick & Dangerous
"We Are No Saints"	2021	18	—	—	—	—	—	—	—	Lifestyles of the Sick & Dangerous
"Bad Idea"	2022	5	—	—	—	—	—	—	—	Lifestyles of the Sick & Dangerous
"Don't Fix Me"	2022	—	—	—	—	—	—	—	—	Lifestyles of the Sick & Dangerous
"Flatline"	2023	—	—	—	—	—	—	—	—	Exit Emotions
"Happy Doomsday"	2023	—	—	—	—	—	—	—	—	Exit Emotions
"Deadzone"	2023	—	—	—	—	—	—	—	26	Exit Emotions
"Die Another Day"	2023	—	—	—	—	—	—	—	—	Exit Emotions
"Everybody (Bloodbros Back)"	2024	—	—	—	—	—	—	—	—	Non-album single
"Diana"	2026	—	—	—	—	—	—	—	—	Painstream
"No Encores In a Swan Song"	2026	—	—	—	—	—	—	—	—	Painstream
"Stars We See"	2026	—	—	—	—	—	—	—	—	Painstream
"Into the Void" (featuring Aaron Pauley)	2026	—	—	—	—	—	—	—	—	Painstream
"—" denotes a recording that did not chart or was not released.

Awards and achievements
Preceded by Aksel Kankaanranta with "Looking Back"	Finland in the Eurovision Song Contest; 2021	Succeeded by The Rasmus with "Jezebel"
