= Blood Brothers (Blind Channel album) =

Studio album by Blind Channel
- Released: 20 April 2018
- Recorded: 2017–2018
- Length: 35:54
- Language: English
- Label: Ranka Kustannus
- Producer: Jonas Olsson

Blind Channel chronology
Revolutions (2016)	Blood Brothers (2018)	Violent Pop (2020)

Blood Brothers is the second studio album by Finnish nu metal band Blind Channel. The album was released on 20 April 2018. The recording began after most of the concerts dedicated to supporting the album Revolutions. In December 2017, the group has announced they had finished the recording of the album. The album was produced by Jonas Olsson, who had also worked on the previous album. Reviewed by Musicalypse and KaaoZine, the album received one of the highest ratings for that year, both reviewers giving the album a nine out of ten stars.

== History ==
The track list for the album included the song "Scream", dedicated to Chester Bennington, lead singer of Linkin Park, who committed suicide in July 2017. Blind Channel explained this act by the fact that the band was inspired by the work of Linkin Park. Also, Niko Moilanen and Joel Hokka presented a video with a cover version of "Numb" — one of Linkin Park's songs. Officially, the cover was not released by the group and was not included in the list of tracks on the album, despite the fact that Hokka, and Moilanen expressed the thought that honouring the memory of Chester Bennington was not enough. In support of the Blood Brothers album, the band organised a Finnish tour and played several shows abroad.

The song "Elephant in the Room" is a collaboration with Spaz Caroon, the younger brother of Blind Channel soloist Niko Moilanen.

== Singles ==
During the recording of the album, Blind Channel released two new singles: "Alone Against All" on April 7, 2017, and "Sharks Love Blood" on September 29 of the same year. Both singles were accompanied by music videos filmed in Finland by director Bille Juurikkala.

In 2018, the band released the third single "Wolfpack" on 19 January 2018. Initially, this title was supposed to be the same of the second album, but during the recording, the musicians came to the decision that Blood Brothers would suit the record better.

The final single, released shortly before the album's release was "Out of Town", was released on 29 March 2018. Although a music video was presented for the song, the group withdrew it from rotation.

== Track listing ==
No.	Title	Length
1.	"Trigger"	3:00
2.	"Elephant in the Room" (featuring Spaz Caroon)	3:29
3.	"Out of Town"	3:12
4.	"My Heart Is a Hurricane"	3:14
5.	"Giants"	3:18
6.	"Like a Brother"	3:30
7.	"Alone Against All"	3:25
8.	"Scream"	3:19
9.	"IDFU"	2:41
10.	"Sharks Love Blood"	3:29
11.	"Wolf Pack"	3:17
Total length:		35:54

== Personnel ==
- Joel Hokka – vocals, guitar
- Niko Moilanen – vocals
- Joonas Porko – guitar, backing vocals
- Olli Matela – bass guitar
- Tommi Lalli – drums
- Spaz Caroon – vocals on "Elephant in the Room"

== Charts ==
Chart performance for Blood Brothers
Chart (2021)	Peak position
Finnish Albums (Suomen virallinen lista)	30
