= Callisto (band) =

Finnish post-metal band

- Also known as: Pulse (2000–2001)
- Origin: Kokkola, Finland
- Genres: Post-metal, Atmospheric sludge metal, Experimental rock, hardcore/metalcore (early)
- Years active: 2001–present
- Labels: Fullsteam, Kireru, Earache, Svart
- Members: Markus Myllykangas; Juho Niemelä; Ariel Björklund; Jani Ala-Hukkala; Jani Rättyä; Tero Holopainen; Janne Storm
- Past members: Johannes Nygård; Henri Kuittinen; Arto Karvonen
- Website: callistochaos.com

Callisto is a post-metal band from Turku, Finland.

== History ==
The band was formed in 2001 in Kokkola, later relocated to Turku. Whilst their early works are hardcore/metalcore, their first album True Nature Unfolds has a strong sludge metal and doom influence.

Recorded in 2004 by the late Mieszko Talarczyk of Nasum fame and introduced to Earache Records a year later through Johannes Persson from Cult of Luna, earning them worldwide distribution.

The band's sophomore album Noir, released in 2006, still drawing from modern sludge also introduced subtle jazz leanings, heavy use of mellotron and experimentation with unconventional rock instruments such as the saxophone and the flute.

Their third album, Providence, released in 2009, marked another experimental shift in style, taking some distance from the more instrumental material, Callisto composed a vocal record presenting a new member Jani Ala-Hukkala handling the vocals.

Exclaim! noted in its review of the album, "Providence is not only Callisto's finest hour but like Year of No Light's Nord and the Ocean's Fluxion, it should become the measuring stick by which all atmospheric hardcore is judged."

The songs on Providence are built upon layers of melodies, using a broader palette they have coloured their sound with twangy guitars, mellotrons, prog rock overtones and a singing style that can be traced back to 90s-era vocalists like Layne Stayley.

In 2015 the band returned after some years of relatively quiet existence with a new album Secret Youth – their fourth full length. Secret Youth is a contradictory concoction of more straightforward elements mixed with a strong and somber experimental overtone, or "progressive noise rock" as the band themselves have described it. Callisto's cryptic lyrics often revolve around theological and existential themes and more difficult subjects, such as spiritual abuse.

Callisto has headlined several tours in Europe from 2004 to 2015. They also opened for High on Fire on their 2005 United Kingdom tour. In March 2007 Callisto showcased in Canada and the United States, playing at the Canadian Music Week in Toronto and the South by Southwest festival in Austin, Texas.

== Members ==
=== Current lineup ===
- Markus Myllykangas – guitars (2001–present), vocals (2001–2008), backing vocals (2008–present)
- Juho Niemelä – bass (2001–present), backing vocals (2001–2006)
- Ariel Björklund – drums (2001–present), percussion (2005–2013)
- Jani Ala-Hukkala – vocals (2008–present)
- Jani Rättyä – percussion (2013–present), throat singing (2014–present)
- Tero Holopainen – guitars (2013–present)
- Janne Storm – keyboards, samples, additional instruments (2015–present)

=== Former members ===
- Johannes Nygård – guitars (2001–2013, guest in 2019 & 2026)
- Henri Kuittinen – keyboards, electronics, samples, guitars (2005)
- Arto Karvonen – keyboards, samples (2005–2015, guest in 2026)

=== Touring musicians ===
- Miika Luoma – drums (2015–present)

=== Former touring musicians ===
- Esa Klapuri – saxophone (2011)
- Jonas Olsson – vocals, guitars (2011)
- Kim Mäenpää – vocals (2011)
- Seba (Kepsah) – saxophone (2015)

== Discography ==
Studio albums

- True Nature Unfolds (2004)
- Noir (2006)
- Providence (2009)
- Secret Youth (2015)

Other releases

- Dying Desire (single, 2001)
- Ordeal of the Century (EP, 2002)
- Jemima/Klimenko (12", 2004)
- The Fugitive (single, 2006)
- Covenant Colours (single, 2009)
- Backbone (single, 2014)
