= Heliocentric (The Ocean album) =

Studio album by The Ocean
- Released: 9 April 2010
- Recorded: April to December 2009
- Studios: Studio Mécanique, La Chaux-de-Fonds, Switzerland; ABC Théatre, La Chaux-de-Fonds, Switzerland; Hidden Planet Studio, Berlin, Germany; Oceanland Studios, Berlin, Germany
- Genres: Post-metal; post-rock; sludge metal; progressive metal
- Length: 50:58
- Labels: Pelagic, Metal Blade
- Producer: Robin Staps

The Ocean chronology
| Precambrian (2007) | Heliocentric (2010) | Anthropocentric (2010) |

Professional ratings
Review scores
| Source | Rating |
|---|---|
| AllMusic | 4.5/5 stars |
| Sputnikmusic | 3.5/5 stars |

Heliocentric is the fourth studio album by German post-metal band the Ocean, released on 9 April 2010. The album marks the recording debut of vocalist Loïc Rossetti. It is the first part of a double album about the critique of Christianity from different philosophical and personal angles, with its companion album, Anthropocentric, which was released on 9 November 2010 in North America.

== Theme ==
The songs, art and lyrics of this album tell the story of the rise of the heliocentric world view - the idea that the Earth revolves around the Sun, and that the Sun is stationary and at the center of the Solar System. Nicolaus Copernicus and Galileo Galilei were the first popular ambassadors of this idea, although ancient Greek astronomers like Aristarchus had already posited this theory centuries before.

The journey starts with the creation of the firmament in Genesis 1:6-20 ("Firmament") and ancient explanations of the movement of celestial bodies in 1 Enoch 72:2-5 ("The First Commandment of the Luminaries"). It continues with Copernicus and Galileo, the first propagators of heliocentrism who were not yet in conflict with the Church ("Ptolemy Was Wrong") and Giordano Bruno, who was burnt at the stake of the Roman Inquisition for being a heretic ("Catharsis of a Heretic"). Arthur Rimbaud's criticism of moral law in his essay Reasons Not to Believe in God and Nietzsche's rejection of fundamental Christian values has inspired the lyrics to "Metaphysics of the Hangman". The album concludes with the greatest achievement in the history of modern science, Darwin's theory of evolution ("The Origin of Species") and ideas inspired by evolution biologist and passionate atheist Richard Dawkins ("The Origin of God", "Epiphany").

Its companion album, Anthropocentric, challenges the views of creationists and other modern fundamentalists who believe that the Earth is at the center of the universe.

== Music ==
Musically, Heliocentric covers the largest range of dynamics and styles to date: "There are a few really calm songs with mainly piano and vocals, as well as some crushing heavy tunes. There is a very special atmosphere to it that pervades the album", comments guitarist Jonathan Nido.

Heliocentric continues where the Proterozoic half of Precambrian left off, with dense, epic songs and big orchestrations. The vocals are the biggest departure from previous albums; they are mostly clean and are more soulful.

== Recording ==
The albums were mainly recorded in the mountainous isolation of La Chaux-de-Fonds, Switzerland. The band decided to record and mix the album with the band's house sound engineer Julien Fehlmann: "We wanted to be in control of every single detail, and we have an amazing studio at hand here. Soundwise this is by far the best-sounding album we have done to date". Samples of the tracks were released on the band's website in February 2010.

== Track listing ==
All music written and arranged by Robin Staps.

| No. | Title | Length |
|---|---|---|
| 1. | "Shamayim" | 1:53 |
| 2. | "Firmament" | 7:29 |
| 3. | "The First Commandment of the Luminaries" | 6:47 |
| 4. | "Ptolemy Was Wrong" | 6:28 |
| 5. | "Metaphysics of the Hangman" | 5:41 |
| 6. | "Catharsis of a Heretic" | 2:08 |
| 7. | "Swallowed by the Earth" | 4:59 |
| 8. | "Epiphany" | 3:37 |
| 9. | "The Origin of Species" | 7:23 |
| 10. | "The Origin of God" | 4:33 |
| Total length: | | 50:58 |

== Personnel ==
=== The Ocean ===
- Luc Hess – drums
- Louis Jucker – bass
- Loïc Rossetti – vocals
- Jonathan Nido – guitars
- Robin Staps – guitars, electronics

=== Additional personnel ===
- Esther Monnat – cello
- Céline Portat – viola
- Estelle Beiner – violin
- Lionel Gafner – contrabass
- Vincent Membrez – piano
- Jérôme Correa – saxophone
- Robert Gutowski – trombone
- Hans Albert Staps – trumpet
- James Yates – vibraphone
- René Noçon – vocals on "Ptolemy Was Wrong"
- Meta – harsh vocals on "Swallowed by the Earth"
