= Holocene (album) =

2023 studio album by the Ocean

Studio album by the Ocean
- Released: 19 May 2023
- Genres: Progressive metal; experimental; electronic; sludge metal
- Length: 52:44
- Label: Pelagic
- Producer: Daniel Lidén

The Ocean chronology
Phanerozoic II: Mesozoic / Cenozoic (2020)	Holocene (2023)	Solaris (2026)

Singles from Holocene
- 1. "Preboreal" Released: 17 January 2023; 2. "Parabiosis" Released: 16 February 2023; 3. "Sea of Reeds" Released: 20 March 2023; 4. "Subatlantic" Released: 19 April 2023

Holocene is the ninth studio album by German post-metal band the Ocean, released on 19 May 2023 through Pelagic Records and produced by Daniel Lidén.

== Background and promotion ==
On 17 January 2023, the Ocean unveiled the first single, "Preboreal", together with a music video. On 6 February, the band announced the album, with a release date and cover artwork.

On 16 February, they published the second single, "Parabiosis", along with an accompanying music video. On 20 March, a third single came out, titled "Sea of Reeds". The band also revealed the album's tracklist at this time. On 19 April, the band issued a fourth single, "Subatlantic".

== Critical reception ==
Professional ratings
Review scores
Source	Rating
AllMusic	4/5 stars
Distorted Sound	8/10
Metal Injection	9/10
Metal Storm	8.1/10
MetalSucks	4/5 stars
New Noise	5/5 stars
Sputnikmusic	4.5/5 stars

Holocene received critical praise. AllMusic gave it a positive review, saying, "Holocene delivers the most varied, restless, and experimental music the Ocean has yet recorded — especially as they lean into electronic music." Will Marshall of Distorted Sound scored the album 8 out of 10 and said: "The dichotomy between crescendo and lull is nothing new to the Ocean, and even while Holocene arguably sits overall on the quieter side, it's no less enthralling, never heavy for the sake of it and still as forward-thinking as ever." Metal Injection rated the album 9 out of 10 and stated, "The Ocean were inevitably going to have a tough time surpassing what they accomplished with the Phanerozoic LPs. While Holocene doesn't definitively best that prior duo, it certainly matches them. By incorporating more electronic elements – as well as the elegance of Park – into their customary yet perpetually alluring recipe, the band has fashioned another immersive journey that's absolutely haunting, courageous, and essential."

MetalSucks rated the album 4 out of 5 and said: "Considering there isn't any more natural history for The Ocean to cover, it's fair to call Holocene a solid end to an era ... It might be quieter in comparison, but it never compromises the creative drive that has kept this band on the vanguard of forward-thinking metal." New Noise Magazine gave the album 5 out of 5 and stated: "Ultimately, Holocene is a rousing success, the kind of record that I would have said would fail on paper. The Ocean going electronic? A metal record with lead ideas from the synth player? (The latter is always a good idea, but I digress). Thankfully, the Ocean found a way to nail a new experiment. Who would have guessed a band obsessed with science would be good at experiments? A modern classic." Sputnikmusic acknowledged that the album "requires patience" but affirmed that "the beauty that unravels from that adventure makes the diversion well worth it."

== Track listing ==
All lyrics are written by Robin Staps; all music is composed by Robin Staps and Peter Voigtmann.

Holocene track listing
No.	Title	Length
1.	"Preboreal"	5:04
2.	"Boreal"	3:41
3.	"Sea of Reeds"	5:48
4.	"Atlantic"	8:49
5.	"Subboreal"	4:46
6.	"Unconformities" (featuring Karin Park)	9:09
7.	"Parabiosis"	8:12
8.	"Subatlantic"	6:55
Total length:		52:44

== Personnel ==
The Ocean

- Loïc Rossetti – lead vocals
- Robin Staps – guitar, programming, backing vocals, arrangements
- David Ramis Åhfeldt – guitar
- Mattias Hägerstrand – bass
- Paul Seidel – drums, backing vocals, vibraphone
- Peter Voigtmann – synths, percussion, arrangements

Additional musicians

- Steve Thompson – trombone
- Fritz Moshammer – trumpet, horn
- Karin Park – guest vocals on track 6
- Frieder Hepting – guest piano on track 6

Additional personnel

- Daniel Lidén – production, mixing, mastering
- Christophe Edrich – vocal production
- Martin Kvamme and Stefan Alt – artwork, layout

== Charts ==
Chart performance for Holocene
Chart (2023)	Peak position
German Albums (Offizielle Top 100)	15
UK Album Downloads (Official Charts)	25
