= Otayonii =

Chinese musician

- Also known as: Lane Mingyu Shi; Jindou Shi
- Born: 1993 or 1994 (age 32–33); Haining, China
- Genres: Art punk, experimental, industrial
- Years active: 2014–present
- Labels: Pelagic Records; WV Sorcerer Productions; Bié Records
- Member of: The Ocean, Fórn
- Formerly of: Dent, Elizabeth Colour Wheel
- Website: otayonii.vercel.app

Chinese name
- Simplified Chinese: 施明妤
Transcriptions
Standard Mandarin
- Hanyu Pinyin: Shī Míngyú

Lane Mingyu Shi (Mandarin Chinese: 施明妤; born either 1993 or 1994), known by stage name Otayonii (occasionally stylized as otay:onii and otay:onii施金豆), is a Chinese musician, sound designer, film composer, and installation artist based currently in Berlin. She was the former lead vocalist of Boston experimental bands Dent and Elizabeth Colour Wheel. Since 2018, Shi has been releasing solo records under the Otay:onii name. She joined Boston doom metal band Fórn in 2018, and in 2026 joined German post-metal collective The Ocean as a vocalist.

== Early life ==
Otay:onii was born in Haining, China. Otayonii has said she was a naughty child, but certain life events silenced her as she was growing up, changing her into a shy, quiet person. In 2010, at age 16, Otayonii moved to the United States from Guangzhou, China.

== Influences ==
Otayonii's music is influenced by Queenadreena. Otayonii credits Chinese and Mongolian singing with influencing her to sing without boundaries.

== Dent ==
Dent
- Origin: Boston
- Genre: experimental metal
- Years active: 2014–2017

Dent was an experimental metal band formed in 2014 by drummer Jack Whelan, guitarist Harley Cullen, bassist Tristan Allen, and vocalist Otayonii, who all met while attending Berklee College of Music.

The Boston Globe described Otayonii's stage presence at Dent shows as "creating a force field around as much of the room as she can reach". Bandcamp Daily stated Dent's "local notoriety grew with each visceral, concrete-shaking basement performance".

In 2015, the band played a 14-city tour of China that spanned 5,700 miles.

On 12 May 2015, Dent released the album, Eyeballs. Boston Hassle reviewed the album, stating, "with all the low/quiet shifts and endless details it simply begs for repeated listening". Phoebe Fico said Otayonii sounded like "a lead singer whose voice warbled and waned like Bjork and a Swedish death metal god had a baby".

In 2017, Dent split up after the members graduated from Berklee.

On 7 June 2019, Dent released the album, Bao Bei, which the band had recorded in 2016.

== Elizabeth Colour Wheel ==
Elizabeth Colour Wheel
- Origin: Boston
- Genre: grindcore
- Years active: 2014–2023
- Label: The Flenser

Chinese name
- Traditional Chinese: 伊麗莎輪
Transcriptions
Standard Mandarin
- Hanyu Pinyin: Yīlìshā lún

Elizabeth Colour Wheel was an American grindcore band formed in 2014 by guitarist Alice Jackson, bassist Bill Cunningham, drummer Connor DeVito, and vocalist Otayonii.

In January 2019, Revolver Mag listed the band on 5 Artists You Need to Know, writing "their live show is something to behold and, impressively, the album manages to capture the same vital energy that exists in their onstage performances."

On 15 March 2019, Elizabeth Colour Wheel released the album Nocebo 疑隱浚患真 under San Francisco-based label The Flenser. Metal Injection described the album as, "a testament to all that is heavy, beautiful, and twisted." Nine Circles wrote Nocebo, "has that timeless quality that marks a unique and vital voice in the music world." BrooklynVegan called Otayonii's voice "soaring and unique".

In 2022, the band played a 50-show tour of the United States. This was Elizabeth Colour Wheel's first time playing for an audience since 2019 (due to the COVID-19 pandemic). A reviewer at The Austin Chronicle commented on Otayonii's physicality during her performance, involving vibrating, exiting the room mid-song, eating the microphone, and making sounds with the microphone lodged in her mouth. Ghost Cult Mag wrote about ECW’s New York show, “Otayonii disappeared into the crowd: the seemingly disembodied shrieking that begged for exorcism made one forget the vocalist had a corporeal form at all until they reemerged writhing in the center of the floor. This visual, as well as auditory experience, made a great opener for the night.” While no official declaration was ever released, she indicates in a video shot for the MAFF Music Art Fashion Forward that she left Elizabeth Colour Wheel in September 2023 due to "unequal treatment" from her bandmates.

== Solo career ==
In 2018, Shi released her solo debut, Nag, on ShadowTrash Tape Group under the stagename Otay:onii.

In 2021, Otay:onii's sophomore solo album, MíngMíng 冥冥, was released on Chinese label WV Sorcerer Productions. Sputnikmusic described the album as "a forward-thinking work that combined industrial, Chinese folk, glitch and just the bare minimum of pop sensibilities into a spellbinding fever dream of unease and liminal suspense." The music video for MíngMíng 冥冥’s closing track, "Un deciphered", was an official selection by the Silicon Valley Asian Pacific Film Festival.

In 2023, Otay:onii released the album, 夢之駭客 Dream Hacker, on Bié Records. The project came out after she returned from living in China for three years, at the start of the COVID-19 pandemic. Pitchfork gave 夢之駭客 Dream Hacker a 7.4 rating. WBUR called the second track on the album, "W.C.", "crushingly eerie".

In March 2023, Otay:onii performed at the high-altitude mountain ranges in Manigango on the Tibetan Plateau for Le Guess Who? and in Austin, Texas for SXSW. In April 2023, she performed at Roadburn Festival in Tilburg, North Brabant.

In September 2024, Otay:onii returned to WV Sorcerer Productions to release her fourth solo LP, True Faith Ain't Blind (信仰看見了我看見了它).

In 2025, Otay:onii released a pair of collaborative LPs with Canadian ambient act thisquietarmy, Howl and Tell and Serpents and Shallows.

Otay:onii made her debut on German label Pelagic Records in May 2026 with fifth full-length solo album, Love is in the Shit (愛在屎邊邊), coinciding with her joining of the label flagship band the Ocean.

== Discography ==
=== Solo ===
- NAG (LP, 2018, ShadowTrash Tape Group)
- MíngMíng 冥冥 (LP, 2021, WV Sorcerer Productions)
- 夢之駭客 Dream Hacker (LP, 2023, Bié Records)
- True Faith Ain't Blind 信仰看見了我看見了它 (LP, 2024, WV Sorcerer Productions)
- Love is in the Shit 愛在屎邊邊 (LP, 2026, Pelagic Records)

=== otay:onii and thisquietarmy ===
- Howl and Tell (LP, 2025, Katuktu Collective)
- Serpents and Shallows (LP, 2025)

=== with Elizabeth Colour Wheel ===
- EP B-Side (Live) (EP, 2015)
- Queen Tired (EP, 2018)
- Nocebo 疑隱浚患真 (LP, 2019, The Flenser)

=== with The Ocean ===
- Solaris (LP, 2026, Pelagic Records)

=== with Fórn ===
- "涂地" (Single from Rites of Despair, 2018)
- Repercussions of the Self (LP, 2024, Persistent Vision Records)

=== Guest appearances ===
- "Impossible Light / Golden Flower" by Uboa (2024, the Flenser)

== Performance art ==
- Naked Winger, Stovefactory Gallery, Charlestown, Massachusetts, 2015
- Muted Jiji, Whisper 局部振动, Mountain Store, Chengdu, China, 2018
- Unwrap! 包裹之外, at Ming Contemporary Art Museum in Shanghai, China, 2021
- A Returning of A One that Must be Loved, Wonderville, Brooklyn, New York, 2015—2023

== Awards and honors ==
2016	Berlin World International Film Festival – Official Selection – Dystopia Rooms
2016	VOID – International Animation Film Festival, Copenhagen – Official Selection – Therapy Rooms
2016	Holland Animation Film Festival – HAFFTube – Official Selection – First Breath
2016	Barcelona Planet Film Festival – Official Selection – Therapy Room + Dystopia Rooms
2016	Hollywood International Moving Picture Film Festival – Award Winner- Dystopia Rooms
2016	Song of the Year- Semi-finalist- Dent
2017	LINOLEUM Festival – Official Selection – Therapy Room
2017	Berlin World International Film Festival / ACT HRFF – Official Selection – Dystopia Rooms
2017	Seoul International Cartoon & Animation – Official Competition – Sorrowful Seed
2017	ReAnima Animated International Film Festival – Best Music Video – Sorrowful Seed
2018	American Track Music Award – Award Winner of Best Independent Artist – Dent – So Red
2018	AMII Work Fest – Award Winner of Best Sound – Therapy Room
2018	Global Music Award – Award Winner Bronze Prize of Best Female Vocal – Dent – Sorrowful Seed
2018	Independent Talent International Film Festival – Finalist – Shaoxing Nomad
2018	Istanbul International Experimental Film Festival – Official Selection – Shaoxing Nomad
2018	Logcinema Music Film Festival – Award Winner of Best Original Song – Sorrowful Seed
2018	Rome Prisma Film Award – Semi-finalist – Shaoxing Nomad
2019	Paris Lift-Off – Official Selection – Shaoxing Nomad
2020	International Sound and Film Music Festival – Official Selection – Shaoxing Nomad
2022	Fear Faire Film Festival – Official Selection – Un deciphered
2022	Silicon Valley Asian Pacific Film Festival – Official Selection – Un deciphered
