= Fluxion (album) =

- Cover art for the 2009 release

Studio album by the Ocean
- Released: November 2004
- Recorded: January 2004
- Studio: Oceanland Studios in Berlin
- Genre: Sludge metal; progressive metal; avant-garde metal; post-metal
- Length: 56:53
- Label: Make My Day
- Producer: Robin Staps, Magnus Lindberg

The Ocean chronology
Fogdiver (2003)	Fluxion (2004)	Aeolian (2006)

Professional ratings
Review scores
Source	Rating
AllMusic	4/5 stars
Kerrang!	4/5 stars
Revolver	5/5 stars
Metal Underground	4.5/5 stars

Fluxion is the debut studio album by German post-metal band the Ocean, released in November 2004 through Make My Day Records. It is the first part of a two-CD project that ended with Aeolian. The two albums were meant to be released together as a double album, but this was cancelled due to financial issues.

Fluxion focuses more on the band's atmospheric and progressive side, including orchestral and electronic elements, whereas Aeolian is more aggressive, focusing on the band's hardcore punk and extreme metal influences.

The album was re-released in 2009 with new vocal tracks by then-lead vocalist Mike Pilat.

== Track listing ==
All tracks are written by Robin Staps.

No.	Title	Length
1.	"Nazca"	4:39
2.	"The Human Stain"	8:06
3.	"Comfort Zones"	4:00
4.	"Fluxion"	4:18
5.	"Equinox"	4:14
6.	"Loopholes"	1:27
7.	"Dead on the Whole"	5:06
8.	"Isla del Sol"	10:31
9.	"The Greatest Bane"	14:32
Total length:		56:53

== Personnel ==
The Ocean

- Meta – lead vocals (2004 edition)
- Nico Webers – additional vocals (2004 edition)
- Robin Staps – guitar, percussion
- Jonathan Heine – bass
- Torge Ließmann – drums
- Gerd Kornmann – percussion
- Mike Pilat – lead vocals (2009 edition)

Additional musicians

- Markus Gundall – backing vocals
- Thomas Herold – backing vocals
- Alex Roos – backing vocals
- Rebekka Mahnke – cello
- Demeter Braun – violin
- Tove Langhoff – clarinette

Production

Original version (2004):

- Michael Schwabe – mastered
- Alex Hornbach – mixing
- Robin Staps – mixing
- Alonso Urbanos – artwork
- Robin Staps – artwork

Re-edition (2009):

- Julien Fehlmann – remix, remaster
- Martin Kvamme – artwork
- Sven Kvamme – artwork
