= Revolutions (Blind Channel album) =

Studio album by Blind Channel
- Released: 1 October 2016
- Length: 38:53
- Language: English
- Label: Ranka Kustannus
- Producer: Jonas Olsson

Blind Channel chronology
Revolutions (2016)	Blood Brothers (2018)

Revolutions is the debut studio album by Finnish nu metal band Blind Channel. The album was released on 1 October 2016, with recording starting in October 2015 with the help of Jonas Olsson, and ended a year later. The album consists of 11 songs, one of which is the cover of the song "Don't" by Ed Sheeran. The album received generally positive reviews, with Finnish publications such as Soundi and KaaosZine giving it high praise, among other review sources.

== Singles ==
The first single from the album, "Unforgiving", was released on 12 June 2015, and later re-recorded and added to the album's tracklist. On 29 September of the same year, Blind Channel released a cover of the Ed Sheeran song "Don't", which was played on radio stations not only in Finland, but abroad as well.

On 19 February 2016, the single "Darker Than Black" was released. The music video, produced with the support of Ranka Kustannus, was issued on the same day. On 22 June of the same year, the band released the single "Deja Fu", as well as the music video for the song. The video was filmed by Teemu Halmetoja, and the video itself was a selection from the group's performances at festivals and concerts in 2016. The last single "Enemy for Me" was released shortly before the album's release on 16 September 2016.

== Track listing ==
Revolutions track listing
No.	Title	Length
1.	"Bullet (With Your Name on It)"	3:35
2.	"Pitfall"	3:27
3.	"Deja Fu"	3:33
4.	"Hold On to Hopeless"	3:42
5.	"What's Wrong"	3:32
6.	"My Revolution"	3:24
7.	"Another Sun"	3:28
8.	"Unforgiving"	3:39
9.	"Don't" (Ed Sheeran cover)	3:39
10.	"Darker Than Black"	3:34
11.	"Enemy for Me"	3:20
Total length:		38:53

== Personnel ==
- Joel Hokka – vocals
- Niko Moilanen – vocals
- Joonas Porko – guitar, backing vocals
- Olli Matela – bass guitar
- Tommi Lalli – drums

== Charts ==
Chart performance for Revolutions
Chart (2022)	Peak position
Finnish Albums (Suomen virallinen lista)	26
