= Breach (band) =

Swedish post-hardcore band

- Origin: Luleå, Sweden
- Genres: Post-hardcore, metalcore, post-metal, sludge metal
- Years active: 1993–2002, 2007
- Labels: Burning Heart Records, Relapse Records, Chrome Saint Magnus, Apocaplexy Records
- Past members: Anders Ekström; Tomas Hallbom; Niklas Quintana; Per Nordmark; Tomas Turunen; Johan Gustafsson; Janne Westerberg; Kristian Andersson; Magnus Höggren; Erik Carlsson; Kalle Nyman; Jejo Perkovic

Breach was a Swedish post-hardcore band formed in Luleå in 1993. The band, which included a large line-up near the end of its existence, is noted for its highly distinctive style, combining elements of hardcore punk, extreme metal, indie-rock, noise rock, and post-punk in a way that set it apart from many of its peers and was greatly influential in underground music circles.

They issued 4 full-length albums through Burning Heart Records and a slew of EPs through a variety of labels before officially breaking up in 2002. Since their split, the group has performed one reunion show in 2007.

== History ==
The band was formed in Luleå in 1993. Friction, their debut album was recorded at Stockholm's Sunlight Studios with engineer Fred Estby and released in 1995. Pelle Gunnerfeldt from Fireside recorded and mixed most of the group's subsequent albums. In 1996, the band toured Europe for the first time in support of Refused. The tour was a great success and helped establish the band, notably in Scandinavia.

Their real breakthrough came with the release of the album It's Me God (1997), which earned them an opening slot in European tour with Neurosis and Entombed. The album was released in the United States the following year and again, in 2000 by Metal Blade. Their next album, Venom (1999) was premiered at a sold-out show at Kafe 44 in Stockholm at which they debuted their two-drummer live show. The album was released by Relapse Records in the United States. After a tour of summer festivals, the band embarked in their third European headlining tour in the fall of 1999.

Shortly after the release of Kollapse (2001), Breach announced that they had decided to split up. Vocalist Tomas Hallbom explained that while there were many factors into the group's break-up, the primary reason for their split was caused by the lack of agreements made within the band's expansive seven-member line-up. The band played a reunion show in Stockholm on 6 December 2007 and ended the show by destroying all their instruments, leading fans to speculate that this would be the band's final show.

== Musical style ==
Breach started as a metal-influenced hardcore band in the vein of Revelation Records and Victory Records acts of the period (their early sets included a cover of Inside Out). From the mid-1990s onwards, the band started to showcase a wider range of influences, name-checking Neurosis, Swedish death metal, Meshuggah, Shellac, The Jesus Lizard, etc. Their overall sound tended to be a lot rawer and unruly than that of most modern post-hardcore bands, owing much to the band's connection to the Swedish indie-rock scene of the era and their proximity to older bands such as The Bear Quartet. Their ambitious last album Kollapse (2001) includes a broader array of instruments (drum machines, various percussions, synthesizers) and ranges from high-velocity rocking hardcore, apocalyptic wall-of-sound sludge metal, dissonant solo guitar interludes, angular noise-rock, and epic post-rock instrumentals echoing Tortoise and The For Carnation.

Critics seem to have missed most of the band's idiosyncrasies, often reducing the band to their post-metal and heavy tendencies. Steve Huey compared the band's sound to the "difficult-to-classify hardcore/metal hybrids on the Victory Records label." Stephen Hill of Louder Sound described the band's style as "Unsane or Prong with more expansive flourishes" as well as name their 2000 album Venom as an underrated release within the European hardcore scene. Kollapse was named "a masterpiece in the violent birth of post-metal" on pinpointmusic.com.

== Band members ==
Final line-up

- Tomas Hallbom (Vocals)
- Anders Ekström (Guitar)
- Niklas Quintana (Guitar)
- Johan Gustafsson (Bass)
- Tomas Turunen (Drums)
- Per Nordmark (Drums)

Former members

- Magnus Höggren (Bass)
- Kalle Nyman (Bass)
- Jejo Perkovic (Drums)
- Janne Westerberg (Drums)
- Erik Carlsson (Guitar)
- Kristian Andersson (Bass)

== Discography ==
Studio albums

- Friction (27 October 1995, Burning Heart)
- It's Me God (28 April 1997, Burning Heart)
- Venom (17 May 1999, Burning Heart)
- Kollapse (3 December 2001, Burning Heart)

Singles and EPs

- Outlines CDEP (1 June 1994, Burning Heart)
- Untitled 7" (1996, Chapel Hill)
- Old Songs vs. New Beats CDEP (1 June 1996, Burning Heart)
- 6-Song Split CD split CDEP with Regression (17 April 1997, Burning Heart/Good Life)
- Amen/Last Rites 7" (1 January 1999, Trust No One)
- Godbox 12"/CDEP (2002, Chrome Saint Mangus)
