= List of screamo bands =

This is a list of bands that have played screamo at some point in their careers.

Screamo is a music genre which predominantly evolved from emo, among other genres, in the early 1990s. The term "screamo" was initially applied to a more aggressive offshoot of emo that developed in San Diego in the early 1990s, which used usually short songs that grafted "spastic intensity to willfully experimental dissonance and dynamics." Screamo is a particularly dissonant style of emo influenced by hardcore punk and uses typical rock instrumentation, but is noted for its brief compositions, chaotic execution, and screaming vocals. The genre is "generally based in the aggressive side of the overarching punk-revival scene, although the term can be vague. The genre was pioneered by bands like Heroin and Antioch Arrow.

== A ==
- Acres
- Alesana
- Alexisonfire
- Ampere
- Anasarca
- Antioch Arrow

== B ==
- Bastions
- The Blood Brothers
- Blessthefall

== C ==
- Circle Takes the Square
- City of Caterpillar
- Coldrain

== D ==
- Daitro
- Deafheaven
- Dufresne

== E ==
- Envy
- An Evening at Elmwood

== F ==
- Febuary
- From Autumn to Ashes
- Funeral Diner
- Funeral for a Friend

== G ==
- Goodtime Boys
- Gillian Carter

== H ==
- Hawthorne Heights
- Heaven in Her Arms
- He Is Legend
- Here I Come Falling
- Heroin

== I ==
- I Hate Myself
- Infant Island

== J ==
- Jeromes Dream

== K ==
- Kaddish

== L ==
- Loma Prieta

== M ==
- Majority Rule

== N ==
- Neil Perry
- Nitro Mega Prayer

== O ==
- Off Minor
- Old Gray
- Orchid

== P ==
- Pg. 99
- Pianos Become the Teeth
- Poison the Well
- Portraits of Past
- Portrayal of Guilt

== R ==
- Raein

== S ==
- Saetia
- Senses Fail
- Shotmaker
- Silverstein
- State Faults
- A Static Lullaby
- Suis La Lune
- Swing Kids

== T ==
- A Thorn for Every Heart
- Thursday
- Touché Amoré

== U ==
- Underoath
- United Nations
- The Used

== V ==
- Vendetta Red
- Vs Self

== W ==
- We Never Learned to Live
