= Fluff Fest =

Hardcore punk festival in Czechia

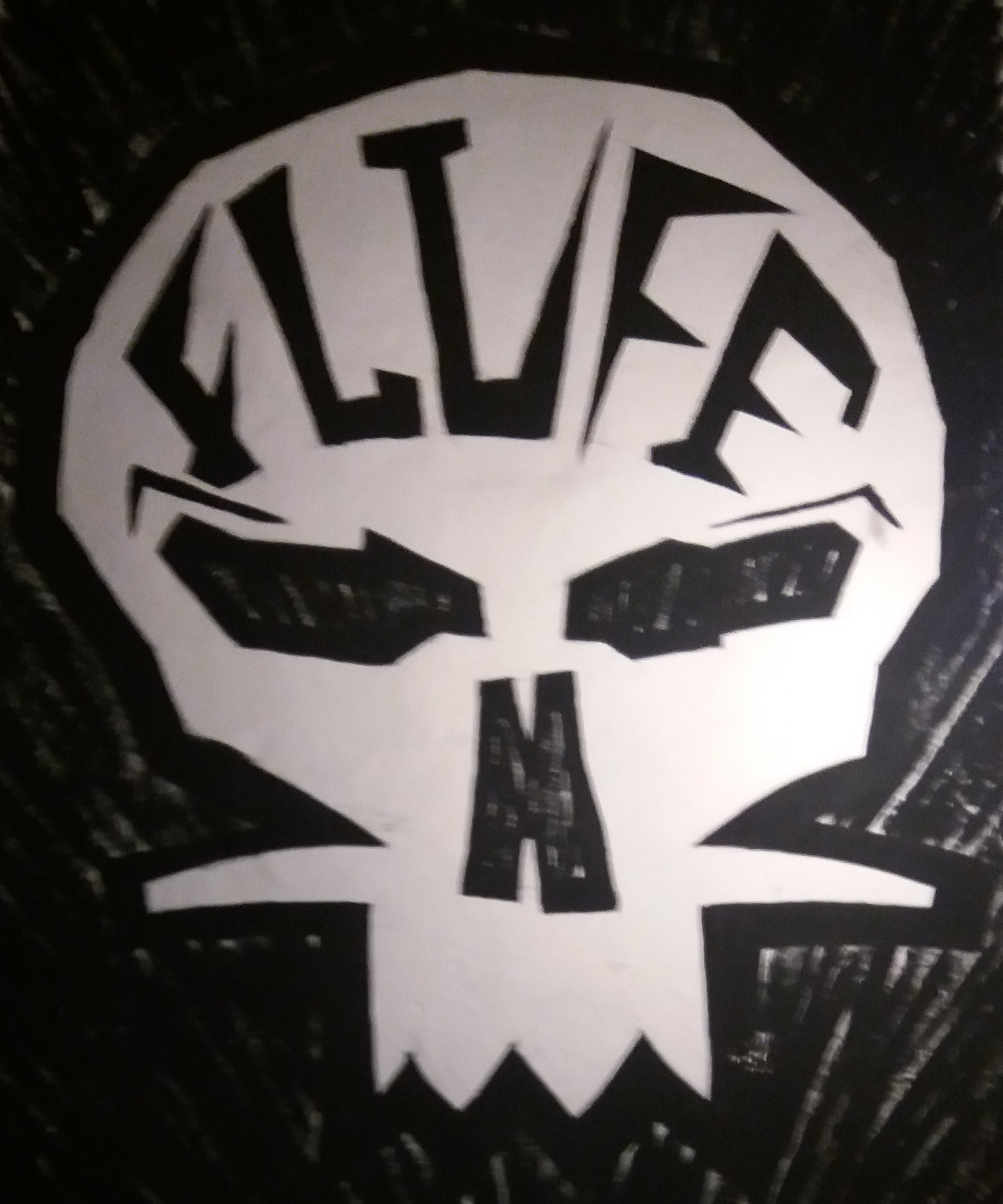
- Fluff logo wall painting at Underdogs', a venue run by the organizers in Smíchov, Prague
- Genre: Hardcore punk; punk rock; extreme metal; experimental
- Dates: Thursday–Monday in late July
- Locations: Rokycany, Plzeň Region, Czechia
- Years active: 2000–2023
- Founders: Michal Kočan; Tomáš Kadlec
- Attendance: several thousand
- Website: flufffest.net

Fluff Fest was an independent hardcore punk festival held each July at the Czech town of Rokycany. A significant event for the DIY music scene of Czechia and the punk subculture of Europe, it was associated with movements such as veganism, anarchism, feminism, anti-fascism, and straight edge. It featured international lineups of bands from diverse punk rock genres including hardcore, crust punk, emo, and grindcore, as well as talks and zines. Catering was provided by local animal rights organization Svoboda zvířat.

Fluff originated from Y2K HC Fest, an event organized in August 2000 in Plzeň by Michal Kočan and Tomáš Kadlec. They renamed it for the 2001 edition and moved it to the Rokycany airfield in 2006. Attendance exceeded 3,000 by 2012, when a free side stage called Psych Tent was established outside the paid festival entrance. Organized by Jakub Ďuraško of Stoned to Death Records, the Psych Tent stage has spearheaded the inclusion of more experimental rock and electronic music into the lineup. The last Fluff was held in 2023.

== Location ==
The festival took place at the airfield in Rokycany. The airfield lies between a forest and a highway.

Fluff Fest has been described as a "strain" on Rokycany, which is not otherwise frequented by foreign visitors and subculture members. It brought a business boom to the town, especially in sales of vegetarian and vegan food. The Czech police, including local municipal units, road units, and investigative units, monitored Fluff with the stated goal of preventing crime, tackling theft, and making sure transportation ran smoothly. Theft of cash, credit cards, mobile phones, and cameras had been an issue on the campsite and the organizers paid to remove graffiti from buildings and rented equipment each year. Nevertheless, Michal Kočan stated in a 2013 interview that unlike in Plzeň where the festival was originally held, few complaints from the residents have reached the organizers and their relationship with the local authorities, who appreciate the international attention that the festival brought, is generally positive.

In a 2011 interview, Kočan reflected that the festival's location in Czechia served as a meeting point between "tired" Western Europe where hardcore punk scenes are oversaturated and "raw" Eastern Europe where they are still forming. In 2013, he confirmed that he hoped to showcase more Eastern European bands at future editions.

== History ==
Vitamin X and Birds in Row have played Fluff four times while Heaven Shall Burn, Good Clean Fun, Endstand, Rise and Fall, Victims, Raein, Dangers, Loma Prieta, and Graf Orlock have appeared three times.

=== Y2K HC Fest ===
Around 1996/1997, Michal Kočan, Tomáš Kadlec, and Míra Kafka visited Ieperfest in Belgium for the first time and decided to organize their own hardcore punk festival. In 1999, the techno-oriented venue Exist formed in Plzeň, entrusted with the premises of a former swimming pool. The building included a hall with a capacity of about 500 and the adjacent ground provided a large camping area, which allowed Kočan and Kadlec to start planning Y2K HC Fest in the summer of 1999. They spent all their savings on the event and enlisted the help of close friends, forming the core festival crew which has stayed intact since. Y2K was held on 4–6 August 2000 with some 1000 attending and over 30 bands performing, including Good Clean Fun, Point of No Return, Cripple Bastards, Heaven Shall Burn, and numerous Czech ones. Perhaps a week prior, the police seized the premises due to Exist's connection to the drug trafficking present in the techno scene, the club's owner having been arrested. Finally, they allowed Kočan and Kadlec to go through with the festival and even pressured the city to grant them a camping area. Although the amount of work involved led the duo to decide that it would be a one-off event, they reconsidered due to positive feedback and the number of contacts they had already made. From then on Kadlec was responsible for it.

=== Fluff Fest 2001 ===
The 2001 edition was held on 3–5 August at the Plzeň exhibition ground and drew perhaps 2000 visitors. It was organized by Kočan and Kadlec along with their English translator Jenny and some 15 friends who worked at the festival from about 2 days prior. They named it after Bellybutton Fluff, a name under which they had promoted shows at the 007 club in Strahov, Prague from 1997 until 2000. They decided to advertise Fluff Fest only within hardcore punk scenes: online, in zines, and through posters and flyers. Performing bands included Vitamin X, Heaven Shall Burn, Caliban, Endstand, and Cataract. At the Vitamin X show, a conflict between stage-diving audience members and organizers who sought to prevent damage to on-stage gear resulted in an early finish. The festival kept moving around Plzeň for 5 years until it settled in Rokycany.

=== Fluff Fest 2002 ===
The 2002 edition was held on 2–4 August and closed by Point of No Return and Good Clean Fun.

=== Fluff Fest 2003 ===
The 2003 edition was held on 1–3 August. Performing bands included Caliban, Deadlock, I Shot Cyrus and Nueva Ética.

=== Fluff Fest 2004 ===
The 2004 edition was held on 23–25 July. Performing bands included Heaven Shall Burn, Analena, the Idoru, and Endstand. The zine library as well as a large number of distro stalls had become features of the festival, as had movie screenings and dance after-parties. Disputes with area owners and the police over camping took place.

=== Fluff Fest 2005 ===
The 2005 edition was held on 15–17 July. Performing bands included Walls of Jericho, the Ocean, Deadlock, and Purified in Blood.

=== Fluff Fest 2006 ===
The 2006 edition was held on 21–23 July, having moved from Plzeň to the Rokycany airfield. It drew about 2500 visitors to a lineup which included Good Clean Fun, 31Knots, the Suicide File, Rise and Fall, and Endstand. The Cinema Tent was established, screening documentaries on topics pertaining also to human rights and music.

A few people who worked on the event questioned the DIY ethic of Kočan and Kadlec due to estimating that the duo's final income was about 755,000 Kč, after subtracting expenses of over 550,000 Kč (including €300 for New Winds, €300 for Good Clean Fun, and €500 for the Suicide File) from their estimated gross income of 1,310,000 Kč. They argued that Kočan and Kadlec sought to profit from the festival and should have given more to workers, benefit campaigns, and bands. They also noted that Svoboda zvířat made perhaps 130,000 Kč selling food. In a 2011 interview, Kočan suggested that this criticism was unfounded and stemmed from a personal grudge, and that if it had led to a major backlash they may have abolished the festival.

=== Fluff Fest 2007 ===
The 2007 edition was held on 20–22 July. Performing bands included Maroon and 108 on Friday, Victims, Set Your Goals, and Vitamin X on Saturday, and La Quiete, Oi Polloi, Rise and Fall, These Arms Are Snakes, and Converge on Sunday. Various workshops were held throughout the festival.

=== Fluff Fest 2008 ===
The 2008 edition was held on 25–27 July, preceded by a welcome movie screening on Thursday 24 July. Performing bands included War from a Harlots Mouth, Meneguar, and Raein on Friday, Daïtro and Maroon on Saturday, and Cataract, Amenra, Death by Stereo, and Bane on Sunday. Side stages had been introduced, including the Arty Tent.

=== Fluff Fest 2009 ===
The 2009 edition was held on 24–26 July and drew about 3000 visitors. Performing bands included Trial, An Albatross, Have Heart, Victims, Ratos de Porão, Fall of Efrafa, Analena, Antillectual, and Rise and Fall. An After-Fluff was held at 007 on Monday 27 July.

=== Fluff Fest 2010 ===
The 2010 edition was held on 23–25 July, preceded by a welcome movie screening on Thursday 22 July. Various movies were screened throughout the festival. Performing bands included Carpathian, Comadre, and Ruiner on Friday, Ampere and Amenra on Saturday, and Cruel Hand and Municipal Waste on Sunday.

=== Fluff Fest 2011 ===
The 2011 edition was held on 22–24 July and drew about 3000 visitors. Announced acts included Ceremony, La Dispute, Black Breath, the Carrier, Blue Note, Victims, Touché Amoré, Ensign, Raein, Rosetta, Polar Bear Club, Dangers, and Joe Lally. Additionally, a diverse group of Czech bands performed. Amnesty International appeared among organizations presenting themselves at the festival. The Cinema Tent held screenings and talks pertaining largely to human and animal rights topics. It also held some electronic and hip hop shows. For the first time, a large share of the main lineup appeared on a second tent stage aside from the classic main stage. The organizers got into a disagreement with their portable toilet provider, leading to a low standard of toilet service which lasted into the next year.

=== Fluff Fest 2012 ===
The 2012 edition was held on 20–22 July. The core crew consisted of about 20 people, joined by 50 to 100 volunteers who helped clean the area in exchange for free entry. An extra food stall was set up, working in benefit of Svoboda zvířat and providing "slightly more expensive but higher quality food". Performing bands included Verse, Pianos Become the Teeth, Trapped Under Ice, Defeater, Self Defense Family, Loma Prieta, Code Orange Kids, Landscapes, Graf Orlock, No Omega, and Light Bearer. Movies were screened at the Cinema Tent, organized by realitaTV, a group monitoring the treatment of animals in commercial use. The Psych Tent appeared as a side stage for the first time, organized by Stoned to Death Records, a label which had just been founded by Jakub Ďuraško in Prague.

There were calls to cancel Defeater's appearance due to their raising funds for the Wounded Warrior Project. Kadlec and guitarist Jake Woodruff exchanged emails in which Woodruff stated that the band members are anti-war, and that the description of soldiers as "heroes fighting for our nation's freedom" in their press release was not written by them and was worded poorly. Upon performing, Defeater said nothing on the issue to the audience and were whistled off stage by anarchist protesters before the end of their set.

Reflecting on the festival in a 2013 interview, Kočan said that although attendances have grown organically with each edition, he would like to "keep as close as possible to the atmosphere of a small punk club show", suggesting "70–100 bands on 3 or 4 stages" plus an open stage as an adequate size limit. He stated that he would rather focus on increasing lineup diversity, quality of services, and the presence of politics and non-musical activities than on getting bigger names on the bill, doubting that Madball or Agnostic Front would ever appear. He envisioned the festival as a space for discussion within hardcore punk, open to anyone who wishes to set up a stall or otherwise present their ideas, which is why Defeater's appearance was not banned. Kočan also noted that while most of the crew work with the touring company Fluffwheels, which has been connected to the festival since the start, he quit this day job to work towards opening a venue in Prague, which opened under the name Underdogs' in the Smíchov district in late 2016.

=== Fluff Fest 2013 ===
The 2013 edition was held on 25–28 July and drew audiences of between 6000 and 8000. For the first time, bands also performed on Thursday, with We Came Out Like Tigers closing this warm-up. Other bands included Code Orange Kids, Harm's Way, Circle Takes the Square, and Full of Hell on Friday, Downfall of Gaia, Brutality Will Prevail, Dangers, and Vitamin X on Saturday, and Mouth of the Architect, the Black Heart Rebellion, Birds in Row, Coliseum, and Strike Anywhere on Sunday. Side stages included Psych Tent II and the first Queer Noises Tent, oriented on electronic music. A speech on the contemporary anarchist movement was given by Brian D. of CrimethInc. while Greg Bennick held a workshop on becoming a hardcore punk vocalist/lyricist. Refundable cups had been introduced to reduce the environmental impact of the event.

=== Fluff14 ===
The 2014 edition was held on 24–27 July and closed by We Came Out Like Tigers, No Omega, Backtrack, D.O.A., Minority of One, and Bane on Sunday. Side stages included Psych Tent III, which was performed by Andrea Belfi on Friday, and Queer Noises Tent 2. Large numbers of activist stalls had become a feature of the festival area. A Pre-Fluff matinée was held at Café na půl cesty on Thursday 24 July.

=== Fluff15 ===
The 2015 edition was held on 23–26 July. Performing bands included Raein, Endpoint, 7 Seconds, Loma Prieta, Trial, MDC, Birds in Row, Dangers, and Svalbard. Movies were screened already on Thursday. Side stages included Psych Tent IV, Queer Noises Tent 3, a grindcore-oriented stage, and an open stage.

=== Fluff16 ===
The 2016 edition was held on 21–24 July. Performing bands included Oathbreaker, Earth Crisis, Graf Orlock, Blacklisted, RVIVR, Rosetta, Totem Skin, Petrol Girls, Minority of One, Archivist, the Black Heart Rebellion, Dawn Ray'd, Swain, No Omega, and Jungbluth, while La Quiete were announced but had to cancel. A petition to ban Earth Crisis' appearance due to some members' alleged anti-abortion views was dismissed by Kadlec as nonsensical. Side stages included Psych Tent V, Queer Noises Tent 4, a grindcore-oriented stage, and an open stage.

=== Fluff17 ===
The 2017 edition was held on 20–23 July and headlined by Heaven in Her Arms, Doom, and City of Caterpillar on Friday, Vitamin X, Burn, and Chokehold on Saturday, and Racetraitor, Birds in Row, and Sect on Sunday. Side stages included: Psych Tent VI; the grindcore-oriented All Go/No Slow stage; an open stage; the Underdogs' Tent, which was curated by a different promoter each night; and the Infoshop Tent, which held acoustic performances on Friday (including Jonah Matranga) and Sunday (including Throw Me off the Bridge, the project of Birds in Row bassist Quentin Sauvé). On Saturday, the Infoshop first held talks including a speech by Greg Bennick and a discussion on the SHAC campaign, before staging several hip hop shows by Czech and Slovak acts.

=== Fluff 2018 ===
The 2018 edition was held on 26–29 July and headlined by Listener, Swain, and Morrow on Friday, Hexis, Ruiner, and Majority Rule on Saturday, and Suffocate for Fuck Sake, Monarch, and Loma Prieta on Sunday. All side stages continued from 2017 except the Underdogs' Tent. The Infoshop Tent held talks on topics such as direct action and gender during the day and acoustic performances at night; Greg Bennick co-led a mental health workshop oriented on depression and suicide support there on Sunday following a main stage speech on Saturday.

=== Fluff 2019 ===
The 20th anniversary 2019 edition was held on 25–28 July. For the first time, shows were also held in Prague, at the organizers' own venue, Underdogs', on Thursday 25 July (headlined by Listener) and Monday 29 July (headlined by Birds in Row). In Rokycany, the main lineup was headlined by Thou on Friday, Ceremony on Saturday, and the Body on Sunday. The open stage was cancelled to give more space to the Infoshop Tent and the Zine Library in the early afternoons, but All Go/No Slow, Psych Tent VIII, and the Infoshop continued as side stages.

=== Fluff 2020 and 2021 (cancelled) ===
The 2020 edition was to be held on 24–27 July. Integrity, Nothing, Petrol Girls, Molchat Doma, Kalle, Infant Island; Crywank, Jucifer, Show Me the Body, The Men, and War on Women, among other artists, were announced. It was cancelled due to the COVID-19 pandemic. Instead, 102,136 Kč (€3,895) from 134 donors was raised for the initiative "Pomáháme lidem na útěku" (Czech Refugee Help).

The 2021 edition was to be held on 22–25 July. Iceage, Petrol Girls, Integrity, Molchat Doma, Dawn Ray'd, Stanley Brinks, and other artists were announced. This edition was also cancelled and a new fundraiser for Czech Refugee Help opened.

=== Fluff 2022 ===
The 2022 edition was set for 28–31 July.

=== Fluff 2023 ===
The 2023 edition was set for 27–29 July and became the last.

== See also ==
- List of punk rock festivals
- List of vegetarian festivals
- Hardcore punk
- Punk subculture
- Punk ideologies
- DIY ethic
