= Shizune (band) =

Italian post-hardcore band

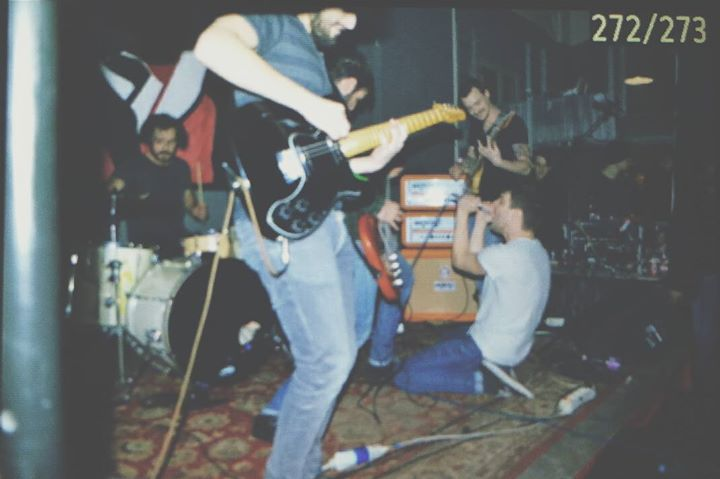
- Shizune performing live in 2015

Background information
- Origin: Lonigo, Vicenza, Italy
- Genres: Screamo, post-hardcore, hardcore punk
- Years active: 2011–present
- Members: Enrico Maule; Francesco Santolin; Riccardo Ballan; John Lume; Tommaso Rey; Alessandro Andriolo
- Past members: Stefano Santagiuliana

Shizune is an Italian post-hardcore band from Lonigo, formed in 2011. They released their self-titled debut EP and their second EP Mono no Aware: eternity/burial in 2012, followed by their debut studio album Le Voyageur Imprudent which was released in 2015 through Dog Knights Productions.

Shizune are noted for the variety of languages used for their lyrics (Italian, English, Japanese, French) and for mixing influences from Raein, La Quiete, Envy (band) and Touché Amoré.

== Discography ==
Studio Albums/EPs

- 2012 - shizune s/t EP
- 2012 - Mono no aware: eternity | burial EP
- 2015 - Le voyageur imprudent LP (Dog Knights Productions)
- 2017 - CHEAT DEATH, LIVE DEAD!
- 2025 - Breviario d'oblio

Split EPs

- 2013 - shizune / minus tree split (Annoying Records)
- 2014 - shizune / tfa / infro / tall ships set sails split (Driftwood Records)
- 2019 - Shizune / Lytic (Zegema Beach Records)

Compilations

- 2014 - Retro engineering artifacts discography (Driftwood Records)
- 2017 - The first five years discography (Hesitation Records)

Other

- 2013 - Il coraggio di essere suonati CD
- 2018 - Envy Love Tribute LP
