= Decompositions: Volume Number One =

Studio album by Circle Takes the Square
- Released: December 21, 2012
- Genre: Screamo, grindcore, post-metal, folk
- Length: 55:30
- Label: Gatepost
- Producer: Anthony Stubelek, Circle Takes the Square

Circle Takes the Square chronology
Rites of Initiation (2011)	Decompositions: Volume Number One (2012)

Decompositions: Volume Number One is the second studio album by American band Circle Takes the Square. The album was released digitally on December 21, 2012 through Gatepost Recordings. Decompositions: Volume Number One is the first studio album released from Circle Takes the Square since 2004's As the Roots Undo.

== Release ==
Circle Takes the Square released the first chapter of Decompositions as a stand-alone, promotional EP on August 23, 2011, and intended to quickly follow up this release with Decompositions: Volume Number One three months later in November 2011. The album was, however, not released until over a year after this projected release date on December 21, 2012 through Gatepost Recordings—coinciding with the alleged 2012 Mayan apocalypse. Decompositions: Volume Number One was originally released digitally through the band's Bandcamp profile with a pay what you want pricing scheme. The limited-time pay what you want price expired upon the release of physical LPs and CDs in January 2013, but has since been reinstated.

== Musical style ==
Brian Shultz of Alternative Press wrote that the band's "self-described bout of 'apocalyptic punk rock'" features "haunting and difficult, almost chokingly dense songwriting that blends practically every type of DIY punk movement of the last two decades and then some into epic, sprawling orchestrations. There are the throat-shredding spasms of early screamo...; grueling, crustcore atmospheres; sludgy, post-metal chugging; erratic, Calculating Infinity-like time changes, dizzying guitar riffs and grindcore drum fills; and even shockingly major-key, inherently melodic folk". According to Doug Moore of Invisible Oranges, the album is more in line with heavy metal than As the Roots Undo in terms of production, and employs elements of hardcore, grind, post-rock, emo and black metal.

Professional ratings
Review scores
Source	Rating
Alternative Press	4/5 stars
Exclaim!	(8/10)
Sputnikmusic	3.5/5 stars

== Track listing ==
Chapter I: Rites of Initiation
No.	Title	Length
1.	"Enter by the Narrow Gates"	6:55
2.	"Spirit Narrative"	2:46
3.	"Way of Ever-Branching Paths"	8:57
4.	"The Ancestral Other Side"	4:27

Chapter II: Totem Polaris
No.	Title	Length
5.	"Prefaced by the Signal Fires"	5:25
6.	"A Closing Chapter (Scarlet Rising)"	4:54
7.	"Singing Vengeance into Being"	6:48
8.	"Arrowhead as Epilogue"	4:24
9.	"North Star, Inverted"	10:54
Total length:		55:30

== Personnel ==
Circle Takes the Square

- Drew Speziale – vocals, guitar
- Kathy Stubelek – vocals, bass
- David Rabitor – guitar, backing vocals
- Caleb Collins – drums, backing vocals

Production

- Anthony Stubelek – recording, mixing, mastering, production
- Circle Takes the Square – production
