= The Heat Death of the Universe =

Studio album by Off Minor
- Released: January 28, 2003
- Studio: Valhala Studios
- Genre: Screamo, jazz punk, post-hardcore
- Length: 22:51
- Label: EarthWaterSky Connection (Germany); Clean Plate Records (United States)
- Producer: Off Minor

Off Minor chronology
| Problematic Courtship (2002) | The Heat Death of the Universe (2003) | Innominate (2004) |

Professional ratings
Review scores
| Source | Rating |
|---|---|
| Sputnikmusic | 5/5 stars |
| Stylus | (A) |

The Heat Death of the Universe is the first full-length album by New York City-based hardcore punk band Off Minor, released on January 28, 2003. The album was released in Germany through EarthSkyWater Connection (who also helped distribute the band's music in Europe) and Clean Plate Records issued the album in the United States.

In 2010, the record was named as the 84th best album released in the 2000s by Sputnikmusic.

== Track listing ==
All tracks are written by Off Minor, except where noted.

| No. | Title | Length |
|---|---|---|
| 1. | "The Heat Death of the Universe" | 2:49 |
| 2. | "This Is a Hostage Situation" | 3:16 |
| 3. | "It's a Beauty" | 1:08 |
| 4. | "Punch for Punch" | 4:48 |
| 5. | "The Transient" | 1:41 |
| 6. | "Staring Down the Barrel of Limited Options" | 2:50 |
| 7. | "Spartan" | 1:50 |
| 8. | "Monday Morning Quarterbacks" | 2:56 |
| 9. | "Off Minor" (Thelonious Monk) | 1:34 |

== Personnel ==
- Jamie Behar – vocals, guitar
- Steven Roche – vocals, drums, recording
- Kevin Roche – bass guitar, photography, design
- Joe Eubanks - typography
- Stan Wright - assistant recording
