= Like Shadows =

Studio album by Ampere
- Released: June 21, 2011
- Genre: Screamo
- Length: 13:23
- Label: No Idea Records

Ampere chronology
All Our Tomorrows End Today (2005)	Like Shadows (2011)

Professional ratings
Review scores
Source	Rating
Rock Sound	7/10 stars
Punknews.org	4/5 stars
The A.V. Club	(positive)

Like Shadows is the second studio album by American screamo band Ampere. The album was released on June 21, 2011, through No Idea Records. Like Shadows followed a string of split EPs and singles and was Ampere's first album in six years. Like Shadows was made available to stream online through The A.V. Club in June 2011.

== Reception ==
Jason Heller of The A.V. Club called it "an instant classic of jagged, chaotic hardcore." and "one of the best things Killingsworth has ever unleashed."

== Track listing ==
No.	Title	Length
1.	"(We're) Stranded"	0:28
2.	"Escapism Pt. II"	0:56
3.	"Centuries Fled"	0:51
4.	"Of Nightmare Reality"	1:20
5.	"Bullshit Sloganeering"	0:20
6.	"Chasing Ghosts"	0:34
7.	"The Submerged Tenth"	0:50
8.	"Statement of Capitulation"	1:02
9.	"We Neither Rise Nor Fall"	1:13
10.	"Maps & Legends"	0:40
11.	"Dead Weight"	0:09
12.	"Flightless"	1:26
13.	"For Automation"	1:06
14.	"Terminally"	0:28
15.	"Tiny Victories"	2:00
Total length:		13:23
