= Orchid (Orchid album) =

Studio album by Orchid
- Released: July 9, 2002
- Studio: Dead Air Studios in Amherst, Massachusetts
- Genre: Screamo; emoviolence; post-hardcore; hardcore punk; sass; emo
- Length: 24:02
- Label: Ebullition
- Producer: Will Killingsworth

Orchid chronology
Dance Tonight! Revolution Tomorrow! (2000)	Orchid (2002)	Dance Tonight! Revolution Tomorrow! + Chaos Is Me (2002)

Professional ratings
Review scores
Source	Rating
AllMusic	2.5/5 stars
Sputnikmusic	4.5/5

Orchid, also known as Gatefold, is the third and final album by the American screamo band Orchid. The album was released in 2002 through Ebullition Records. Gatefold marks the band's departure from their early more-aggressive sound in favor of a more sasscore/art punk sound, while still maintaining the powerviolence frenzy.

== Track listing ==
Side A
No.	Title	Length
1.	"Amherst Pandemonium (Part 1)"	0:55
2.	"Amherst Pandemonium (Part 2)"	0:47
3.	"Chaos Ain't Me"	0:29
4.	"Loft Party"	2:46
5.	"I Wanna Fight"	0:47
6.	"A Visit from Dr. Goodsex"	1:17
7.	"We Love Prison"	1:52
8.	"Fashion Meets Passion"	0:50
9.	"Trail of the Unknown Body"	2:24
10.	"Class Pictures"	0:34

Side B
No.	Title	Length
11.	"No, We Don't Have Any T-Shirts"	0:48
12.	"Dissadents in Love"	1:05
13.	"Flip the Tape"	0:27
14.	"Anais Nin by Numbers"	0:54
15.	"Tigers"	2:07
16.	"Let's Commodify Sexuality"	1:30
17.	"Discourse of Desire"	1:24
18.	"None More Black"	1:54
19.	"Impersonating Martin Rev"	1:09
Total length:		24:02

== Personnel ==
Orchid

- Geoff Garlock – bass
- Jayson Green – vocals, percussion, keyboards
- Will Killingsworth – guitars, keyboards, sound collage
- Jeff Salane – drums

Technical personnel

- Alan Douches – mastering
- Will Killingsworth – engineering

Artwork

- Jayson Green – design
- J. Penry – design, color illustration of Angela Davis
