= Dance Tonight (disambiguation) =

"Dance Tonight" is a song by Paul McCartney from the album Memory Almost Full.

Dance Tonight may also refer to:

- "Dance Tonight" (Lucy Pearl song)
- Dance Tonight! Revolution Tomorrow!, an album by Orchid
- "Dance 2Night", a song by Madonna from the album Hard Candy (Madonna album)
