= Hello There (album) =

Studio album by Coaltar of the Deepers and Boris
- Released: January 24, 2024
- Genre: Alternative metal
- Length: 39:23
- Label: Dog Knights Productions

Coaltar of the Deepers chronology
Revenge of the Visitors (2021)	Hello There (2024)

Boris chronology
Bright New Disease (2023)	Hello There (2024)	Twins of Evil (2024)

Hello There is a collaborative studio album by the Japanese alternative rock band Coaltar of the Deepers (COTD) and experimental rock band Boris. It was released on January 24, 2024, through Dog Knights Productions.

== Background ==
Japanese bands Coaltar of the Deepers (COTD) and Boris previously collaborated in 2019, when Boris made a cover of COTD's "To The Beach", which Narasaki of COTD produced. In 2022, both bands held their first joint concert together.

== Release ==
In August 2023, COTD and Boris announced a collaborative tour promoting their upcoming album Hello There, which was later released on CD on January 24, 2024. The track listing is split between both bands, the tracks being the associated band's rendition of previously released songs by the other band. On February 9, 2024, they released "Serial Tear", Boris' rendition of a COTD song from 2007, as well as "Melody", COTD's rendition of a Boris song from 2014.

On March 22, 2024, Hello There was released on digital services by Dog Knights Productions.

== Track listing ==
The first four tracks were made by Coaltar of the Deepers, while the last three tracks are by Boris.

No.	Title	Length
1.	"Wipeout"	3:58
2.	"Melody"	6:11
3.	"Waterbird"	4:27
4.	"Killing Another"	3:33
5.	"Luna"	7:42
6.	"Quicksilver"	6:57
7.	"Serial Tear"	6:32
Total length:		39:23
