= Chaos Is Me =

Studio album by Orchid
- Released: June 21, 1999
- Recorded: Spring 1999
- Studio: God City Studios (Salem, Massachusetts)
- Genre: Screamo; emoviolence; hardcore punk
- Length: 18:58
- Label: Ebullition
- Producer: Kurt Ballou

Orchid chronology
Orchid / Encyclopedia Of American Traitors Split 7" (1998)	Chaos Is Me (1999)	Dance Tonight! Revolution Tomorrow! (2000)

Professional ratings
Review scores
Source	Rating
AllMusic	4.5/5 stars
Sputnikmusic	4/5 stars

Chaos Is Me is the debut studio album by American screamo band Orchid. It was released on June 21, 1999, through Ebullition Records. Chaos Is Me heralded the change of the guard for extreme music, and brought both Amherst, Massachusetts and Hampshire College to the forefront of the scene's attention. The album was released on black, clear yellow, green, and red vinyl in 1999, and was also included on a 2002 compilation CD that included its follow-up Dance Tonight! Revolution Tomorrow!. It has since been reissued multiple times, on magenta vinyl in 2013, lavender vinyl in 2015, yellow vinyl in 2018, and received a 20th anniversary reissue in 2019.

== Track listing ==
No.	Title	Length
1.	"Le Desordre, C'est Moi"	2:05
2.	"Aesthetic Dialectic"	1:42
3.	"In G and E"	0:57
4.	"New Jersey vs. Valhalla"	2:12
5.	"Weekend at the Fire Academy"	0:56
6.	"Framecode"	1:35
7.	"The Action Index"	1:52
8.	"Death of a Modernist"	0:53
9.	"Boy with No Arms"	1:52
10.	"Invasion U.S.A."	1:00
11.	"Epilogue of a Car Crash"	3:54
Total length:		18:58

== Personnel ==
Orchid

- Jayson Green – vocals, lyrics
- Will Killingsworth – guitar
- Brad Wallace – bass
- Jeff Salane – drums

Production

- Kurt Ballou - production, recording
