= Some Blood =

Studio album by Off Minor
- Released: July 1, 2008
- Recorded: November 2007 – February 2008
- Studio: Permanent Hearing Damage (Philadelphia, Pennsylvania)
- Genre: Screamo, post-hardcore
- Length: 22:00
- Label: Paramnesia Records (United States); Narshardaa Records (Germany); Purepainsugar (France)
- Producer: Off Minor

Off Minor chronology
| Innominate (2004) | Some Blood (2008) |

Professional ratings
Review scores
| Source | Rating |
|---|---|
| Sputnikmusic | 5/5 stars |
| Collective Zine | favorable |

Some Blood is the third and final studio album by New York screamo band Off Minor, released on July 1, 2008. It was released in the United States, as well as distributed in Asia, by Paramnesia Records, while Narshardaa Records and Purepainsugar released and distributed the album in Europe. It was also released digitally on a donations system where buyers were allowed to donate as much or as little as they wished, similar to Radiohead and Nine Inch Nails' releases in 2008.

Jamie Behar stated that the album was recorded in three weekends between November 2007 to February 2008. Behar recorded all of his vocals and guitar parts in only a few sessions, allowing both Kevin and Steven Roche to record their respective parts for the remainder of the sessions. Due to schedule and personal conflicts, the band decided to make it their last recording. They would perform a worldwide tour to support the album in the summer of 2008.

The band has gone on to state favorable things about the album. Behar stated that Some Blood is his favorite Off Minor album. Steve Roche mentioned that his favorite Off Minor song is "Everything Explicit".

== Track listing ==
| No. | Title | Length |
|---|---|---|
| 1. | "Neologist" | 2:33 |
| 2. | "Some Blood" | 2:08 |
| 3. | "Everything Explicit" | 5:47 |
| 4. | "To An Ex" | 2:04 |
| 5. | "No Conversationalist I" | 0:38 |
| 6. | "Practice Absence" | 8:43 |

== Personnel ==
- Jamie Behar – vocals, guitar
- Steven Roche – vocals, drums, recording
- Kevin Roche – bass guitar, artwork
- Nishat Akhtar - artwork
- Jason Ward - mastering
- Zia Hiltey - photography
- Jess Kamen - vocals on "Practice Absence"
