= Suis La Lune =

Swedish screamo band

- Origin: Stockholm and Gothenburg, Sweden
- Genres: Screamo, emo, post-rock
- Years active: 2005-2018
- Labels: Topshelf; Dog Knights; Protagonist
- Members: Henning Runolf; Andreas Olerås; Daniel Pettersson; Karl Sladö

Suis La Lune (French for “Follow the Moon”) were a Swedish screamo band from Stockholm and Gothenburg, Sweden.

== History ==
=== Early years and Quiet, Pull The Strings! (2005–2006) ===
Suis La Lune formed in February 2005. The band released a 4-song demo a few months later and performed their first live shows. A self-titled 7-inch record was released in November on UK-based label Leaves Records. Later that month the band went on to play their first international shows on a tour in the UK. The band returned to the studio in early 2006 to record their first full-length album. The record titled Quiet, Pull The Strings! was released in autumn 2006 through Ape Must Not Kill Ape Records. The band played on tour in Germany, Belgium and The Netherlands in support of the album.

=== Becoming a four-piece band, Heir and US-tours (2007–2010) ===
In July 2007 the band parted ways with guitarist and backup vocalist Robert Svensson, with Henning Runolf taking on guitar duties while keeping his role as the main vocalist. Later that year they again went on tour in Europe. In 2008, Suis La Lune released a 10-inch EP record titled Heir. Through Myspace, the band came in contact with members of Baltimore hardcore act Osceola and got booked for a two-week East Coast tour. They toured the first leg of the tour with Osceola, and the second with Army of Kashyyyk, also hailing from Baltimore. A split 7-inch record with Suis La Lune and Osceola was released concurrently with their tour on independent record label Protagonist Music.

Suis La Lune went back to the US in 2010, this time on a tour that spanned 32 days and which covered the East Coast and some of the Midwest. They primarily toured with Baltimore hardcore and DIY-bands Pala, Fair Root and Heaviness Of The Load. A tour 7-inch record was released in support of the tour through Protagonist Music and Fasaden Records.

=== Touring Europe, Riala and hiatus (2011–2012) ===
In April 2011, Suis La Lune went on tour in Europe and the UK with American post-hardcore band Pianos Become the Teeth. For the remainder of the year, Suis La Lune wrote, rehearsed and pre-produced their forthcoming full-length album.

In January 2012, Suis La Lune started recording their sophomore full-length album and announced it would be released by Topshelf Records. The album, titled Riala, was released in May of that year, after which the band embarked on a summer tour that included the UK, Europe and Russia.

In September 2012, Suis La Lune announced they would go on a temporary break. During the hiatus, band members focused on side projects like Sore Eyelids and Trembling Hands.

=== Instrument swap and Distance/Closure (2014–2015) ===
In January 2014, the band communicated they were active again. No changes had been made to the line-up with the exception of Karl and Daniel switching instruments. According to the band the change was made in referral to Daniel's wrist health. In November 2014. the band announced that they would release a new record on Topshelf Records, and on 31 July 2015, the 12-inch EP Distance/Closure was released. Throughout 2015, Suis La Lune supported Ampere, Loma Prieta and Pianos Become the Teeth when the aforementioned bands performed in Sweden.

=== International touring, split release with Shirokuma and disbanding (2016–2018) ===
In May 2016, Suis La Lune went on tour with Italian band Pastel in Italy and Austria. Later during the year, they released a split 12-inch record with the Swedish band Shirokuma via Dog Knights Productions. In 2017 Suis La Lune traveled to Japan to play two shows in Tokyo. A compilation CD titled The First Five Years was released on Japanese record label Tokyo Jupiter Records in support of the shows.

On 12 August 2018, the band announced they had broken up via social media. In the same week, Dan Ozzi of Noisey included the band in an article covering the reach of screamo music outside of the US in which he described the band as "a powerhouse of the Swedish scene." When reporting the breakup, alternative music and media publication The New Fury described the band as "one of the most acclaimed screamo/post-hardcore bands in the music scene". Writing for Punktastic, reviewer Glen Bushell named Suis La Lune "masters of their own unique art". While listing 25 essential screamo albums online magazine BrooklynVegan hailed Suis La Lune, among other bands, as "incredible".

== Discography ==
=== Studio albums ===
Year	Release details	Notes
2006	Quiet, Pull The Strings!: Released: October 2006; Label: Ape Must Not Kill Ape; Format: CD, LP	CD edition printed in 1000 copies. In 2007 a LP edition of 600 copies was released through Ape Must Not Kill Ape Records, Release The Bats Records, Asymmetire Records and Quiet Still Dead Records. In 2012 LP reissue of 500 copies was released on Fasaden Records and Serene Records.
2012	Riala: Released: 22 May 2012; Label: Topshelf Records; Format: CD, LP, MP3	Issued through Topshelf Records in May 2012 on CD and vinyl formats. CD pressing included a 1000 copies. First vinyl pressing included 498 white copies, 300 clear with haze copies and 204 half black half pink copies. Second pressing included 259 blue with white splatter copies and 259 clear with black splatter copies. Third pressing included 497 translucent green copies.

=== Extended plays ===
Year	Release details	Notes
2008	Heir: Released: October 2008; Label: Fasaden Records; Format: CD, 10-inch, 12-inch	First released in October 2008 on 10-inch vinyl record with accompanying CD edition on Fasaden Records, Escucha! Records, TDD Records, Blessed Hands Records and Neat Skeleton Records. Reissued by Black Star Foundation in June 2010 on 10-inch vinyl record. Reissued by Fasaden Records and Serene Records on 12-inch vinyl record in June 2012.
2015	Distance/Closure: Released: 2015; Label: Topshelf Records; Format: LP	First pressing contained 574 copies on oxblood with olive green splatter, 240 copies of oxblood and 148 copies of olive green.

=== Singles ===
Year	Release details	Notes
2005	Suis La Lune: Released: November 2005; Label: Leaves Records; Format: 7-inch	First released in November 2005 on 7-inch vinyl record. Reissued on Fasaden Records, Escucha! Records, Listen To Aylin Records and Quiet Still Dead Records in 2009 on 7-inch vinyl record.
2010	US Tour 2010: Released: June 2010; Label: Fasaden Records; Format: 7-inch	Issue of 300 copies.
2011	EU Tour 2011: Released: April 2011; Label: Fasaden Records; Format: 7-inch	Leftover copies from the US Tour 7-inch reused as EU Tour 7-inch with newly printed covers.

=== Split releases ===
Year	Release details	Notes
2009	Suis La Lune/Osceola: Released: 2009; Label: Escucha! Records, Protagonist Music; Format: 7-inch	100 copies on clear vinyl.
2010	Connections: Pt. II: Released: 2010; Label: Moment of Collapse Records; Format: 12-inch	515 copies. A six-way split release with Adorno, Kias Fansuri, Isaïah, Captain Your Ship Is Sinking and The Saddest Landscape
2016	Suis La Lune/Shirokuma: Released: 2016; Label: Dog Knights Productions; Format: 12-inch	Split release with Swedish band Shirokuma. First pressing included 100 copies of cream with cherry & blue splatter, 250 copies of solid cherry and 250 copies of solid blue suede. The second pressing included 200 copies of cherry & cream mix and 200 copies of blue & cream mix.

=== Demos ===
Year	Release details	Notes
2005	Suis La Lune: Released: 2005; Label: Self released; Format: 3" CD-R	Hand sewn cloth covers.

=== Compilation albums ===
Year	Release details	Notes
2017	The First Five Years: Released: 2017; Label: Tokyo Jupiter Records; Format: CD	The release features the music released between 2005 and 2010, with the exception of full-length album Quiet, Pull The Strings!

=== Compilation appearances ===
Year	Release details	Notes
2006	The Emo Apocalypse: Released: 2006; Label: React With Protest Records; Format: 12-inch	1070 copies on black vinyl. Suis La Lune is featured with the song As Concrete Replaces Hope.
2008	Har du hört den förut? 29 svenska artister tolkar Förmögenhet: Released: 2008; Label: Diskret Förlag; Format: CD	29 bands perform covers of songs by Swedish band Förmögenhet. Suis La Lune is featured with the song Förmögenhet.
2022	Everything Else, Pt. 1: Released: 2022; Label: Dog Knights Productions; Format: digital download	
2022	Everything Else, Pt. 2: Released: 2022; Label: Dog Knights Productions; Format: digital download	

== Band members ==
=== Members ===
- Henning Runolf – vocals (2005–2018) & guitars (2007–2018)
- Andreas Olerås – bass & backing vocals (2005–2018)
- Daniel Pettersson – guitars & backing vocals (2014–2018), drums (2005–2014)
- Karl Sladö – drums (2014–2018), guitars & backing vocals (2005–2014)

=== 2014 instrument switch ===
Prior to 2014, Daniel played drums and Karl played guitar. Due to wrist health problems, Daniel switched instruments with Karl as of 2014 and onwards.

=== Former members ===
- Robert Svensson – guitars & backing vocals (2005–2007)
