= Totem Skin =

Swedish hardcore punk band

- Origin: Falun and Borlänge, Dalarna, Sweden
- Genres: Crust punk, grindcore, screamo, post-metal
- Years active: 2012–2017
- Labels: Halo of Flies, Protagonist, Adagio830, Tokyo Jupiter, Wolves of Hades, Dog Knights Productions, Middleman
- Past members: Henrik Dahlqvist; Christoffer Öster; Glenn Zettersten; Sebastian Engström; Jesper Sundström; Jonas Axelsson; Victor Eriksson
- Website: totemskin.bandcamp.com

Totem Skin were a Swedish hardcore punk band from Dalarna. The band was formed in 2012 by guitarist Christoffer Öster and vocalists Henrik Dahlqvist and Glenn Zettersten. They released two studio albums, Still Waters Run Deep in 2013 and Weltschmerz in 2015, combining raw ferocity with dark atmospheres. Totem Skin disbanded in January 2017; what was to be their third album has been reworked into the self-titled debut album of Öster's new project Dödsrit.

== History ==
Totem Skin was formed in 2012 by guitarist Christoffer Öster, who wrote some songs and was joined by vocalists Henrik Dahlqvist and Glenn Zettersten for their recording. The band's name is based on a lyric from the song "Tauntrum" from Document No. 12 by Pg. 99. They abandoned their original intention to exist as a studio band, asking guitarist Jesper Sundström and drummer Sebastian Engström to perform live with them in the winter of 2012/2013 while recording their second EP. By March, the band transformed into a sextet with the addition of bassist Jonas Axelsson. At this point, they had already self-released two EPs, both mixed and mastered by Alexander Backlund: Totem Skin on 21 August 2012 and These Ghosts Are Haunting Our Halls on 18 March 2013. This was followed in 2014 by a split EP with Swedish band Heart on My Sleeve.

The band's debut studio album Still Waters Run Deep, which was mixed, mastered and engineered by Lewis Johns with assistant engineer Tony James and recorded at the Ranch Production House on the outskirts of Southampton, England, came out on 29 October 2013 through Dog Knights Productions, Protagonist Music and Middleman Records. It was the first set of songs that they had written "together as a whole group with the intent of performing them live" and with "a more or less running theme in the lyrics as well as the music". The album's artwork was made by Adrian B. of Coven Illustracion; it depicts a skogsrå, reflecting the album's lyrical focus on the power of nature and its relation to society. The final song, "Seasons Don't Fear the Reaper, We Can Be Like They Are", which was re-recorded from their first EP, features a sample from Silent Hill 2.

Totem Skin's sophomore album Weltschmerz was released on 12 October 2015, on vinyl through Halo of Flies Records and Protagonist Music in the United States and Adagio830 in Europe, on CD through Tokyo Jupiter Records, and on tape through Wolves of Hades. It was engineered by Johns with assistant engineer Chris Lyndon and recorded at the Ranch Production House in March 2015, while the artwork was made by Chris Panatier. In 2016, Zettersten, Sundström and Engström formed the crust punk project Vardagshat. On 26 January 2017, the band announced that they were breaking up, and that what was supposed to be their third studio album will be recorded under a different project. On 6 June, they announced that the new band and album will be named Dödsrit. The album was released on 13 October 2017 through Alerta Antifascista Records.

== Style ==
On their Bandcamp, Totem Skin placed their work mostly within the categories of punk, atmospheric, blast beat, d-beat, hardcore, screamo, metal, sludge and tremolo, and less frequently grind, blackened and emo. Their style had been described in reviews of their sophomore album Weltschmerz. Comparing them to KEN mode, Echoes and Dust praised the way the album blends brutal grindcore with "occasional ambient touches" and high-fidelity production. Rock n Roll Reviews likened the band to Converge, writing that they managed to infuse "extreme metal into hardcore" through the "combination of punk ideals with the atmospherics of black metal and the slow crunching riffs of doom" in an original way. According to Metal Trenches, "Totem Skin delivers a mix of crust and hardcore with a few post-metal touches". Rushonrock stated that they inhabit "the same scorched musical landscape as Nails and Trap Them ... [and] while their style has plenty in common with the contemporary US crust scene, they mosh to their own tune ... [at times conjuring] an icy atmosphere, giving the album a sense of foreboding and even nodding to fellow Swedes Cult of Luna." Reviewing their debut album Still Waters Run Deep, Already Heard also compared them to Converge. Terrorizer wrote that Still Waters Run Deep "[weaves] intricate and sombre melodies in amongst ... apocalyptic displays of aggression", and called Totem Skin a "dark hardcore" band.

When asked about their combination of ominous atmosphere and dire vocals, likened to Circle Takes the Square's As the Roots Undo, in a 2013 interview with Idioteq, Totem Skin replied that they were inspired by their environment, particularly Sweden's nature. They stated that their lyrics are mostly written by vocalists Henrik Dahlqvist and Glenn Zettersten, with some by guitarist Christoffer Öster, who comes up with most initial ideas for songs. When asked whether they feel to be a part of a contemporary movement of bands such as Nails, This Gift Is a Curse, Oathbreaker and Deafheaven blending post-hardcore and post-metal with black metal, they said that although some of them like these bands, different members of the band have different tastes and overall they would simply call themselves a hardcore band. In another slightly later interview they repeated the last point, saying that if they had to apply a label to themselves, it would be "Käng-emo".

== Members ==
- Henrik "Henke" Dahlqvist – vocals (2012–2017)
- Christoffer "Chris" Öster – guitar (2012–2017)
- Glenn Zettersten – vocals (2012–2017)
- Sebastian "Sebbe" Engström – drums (2013–2017)
- Jesper Sundström – guitar (2013–2017)
- Jonas Axelsson – bass (2013–?)
- Victor – bass (?–2017)

== Discography ==
Studio albums

- Still Waters Run Deep (2013)
- Weltschmerz (2015)

EPs

- Totem Skin (2012)
- These Ghosts Are Haunting Our Halls (2013)

Splits

- Totem Skin / Heart on My Sleeve (2014)
