= As the Roots Undo =

Studio album by Circle Takes the Square
- Released: January 6, 2004
- Recorded: May 2003
- Studio: Rockstudio (Brunswick, Georgia)
- Genre: Screamo, grindcore, post-rock
- Length: 44:01
- Label: Robotic Empire; HyperRealist

Circle Takes the Square chronology
Document #13: Pyramids In Cloth (2002)	As the Roots Undo (2004)	Decompositions: Volume Number One (2012)

Professional ratings
Review scores
Source	Rating
Chronicles of Chaos	9.5/10
Ox-Fanzine	8/10
Stylus	6/10
Terrorizer	7.5/10

As the Roots Undo is the debut studio album by American screamo band Circle Takes the Square. It was released on CD and vinyl in 2004 by the Robotic Empire and HyperRealist labels respectively. The album would later see a repress on the LP format in 2014 through GatePost Recordings.

The album is a contender for the most celebrated screamo record. Noisey called it "one of the most critically acclaimed cult classics in modern hardcore" which has "long garnered praise from both the press and fans alike for its forward-thinking blend of 90s screamo, fractured grindcore, and experimental post-rock."

== Composition and music ==
When asked about his influences at the time of writing As the Roots Undo, Drew Speziale referred to bands that were innovating punk and hardcore through incorporating a lot of melody, including their tour-mates Majority Rule, Pg. 99 and City of Caterpillar and bands who had "really dark melodies going on underneath [an] overtly pretty brutal sound" such as Orchid and His Hero Is Gone, besides less intense artists such as Godspeed You! Black Emperor, Modest Mouse and Built to Spill.

According to Andrew Sacher of BrooklynVegan, the band "used ’90s-style screamo as a launching point, and from there they explored spoken word, avant-garde passages, progressive rock song structures, spirituals, sweeping post-rock build-ups, and so much more. It’s structured like a concept album, with recurring themes and lyrics, multi-part suites, and songs that are written to flow directly into the next."

== Artwork ==
The CD is packaged in a four-fold flap with artwork along each side; the artwork was done by band member Drew Speziale.

== Track listing ==
All tracks are written by Circle Takes the Square

No.	Title	Length
1.	"Intro"	0:55
2.	"Same Shade as Concrete"	4:28
3.	"Crowquill"	2:44
4.	"In the Nervous Light of Sunday"	6:17
5.	"Interview at the Ruins"	5:09
6.	"Non Objective Portrait of Karma"	6:46
7.	"Kill the Switch"	9:33
8.	"A Crater to Cough In"	8:13

== Personnel ==
Circle Takes the Square

- Drew Speziale - guitar, vocals, artwork
- Jay Wynne - drums, sampler, vocals
- Kathy Coppola - bass, vocals

Production and Artwork

- Collin Kelly - layout
- Matt Gauck - layout
- Sam Maynard - layout
- Anthony Stubelek - recording
