= Coaltar of the Deepers =

Alternative rock band from Japan

- Origin: Tokyo, Japan
- Genres: Alternative rock; shoegaze; heavy metal
- Years active: 1991-Present
- Labels: Strange Records (1991); Stomly Records (1992); AJA Records (1992); ZK Records (1994-1998); Victor (1998) musicmine (1999-) cutting edge (2002); KNIR (2004-)
- Members: NARASAKI (Vocals, Guitar); KANNO (Drums)
- Past members: negishi (Guitars); Kawanaka (Bass) nagasawa (Bass); ICHIMAKI (Guitars, Backup Vocals); YOSHIO (Bass)
- Website: Official website

Coaltar of the Deepers are an alternative rock band from Japan. They formed in May 1991. Although primarily influenced by shoegaze and post-rock sound, their sound incorporates musical elements as diverse as thrash metal, electronica, neo-acoustic, and bossa nova. Possessing a devoted fanbase, they are also known for their Prince, The Cure, The Primitives, and My Bloody Valentine covers.

== History ==
=== Biography ===
In early 1991, the band was formed in Tokyo by frontman Narasaki. During that time, they recorded demo tapes including most of the songs eventually incorporated into their first release "White EP," on Strange Records. The EP had former member Watanabe on vocals while Narasaki played guitar. The band's activity was silent until the end of 1992, when they released their second EP, "Queen's Park all you change" on Stomly Records. The band gained some recognition which showed the release of their third EP, "Sinking Slowly" a month later.

The band had little activity until the release of their first album, The Visitors From Deepspace in 1994 on Victor Records. In 1997 the band released new material; another EP, "Cat EP" was released on ZK Records. In 1998, the band released "Submerge", an album full of remixes, rare and new songs and a best-of album, Breastroke. A new EP Dog EP preceded their next full-length album in 2000, Come Over to the Deepend (a play on the band's abbreviation COTD).

In the style of Come Over to the Deepend, the band released Robot EP in 2001, which was followed by the album No Thank You. The album marked a new era for the band as they experimented even more heavily with electronic beats and noises. A new album was released in 2002, newave. With their small U.S. tour in 2003, Narasaki showed interest in an even heavier sound and released the Mouse and Penguin EPs.

After the release of the 2004 EPs, Narasaki composed the musical score for the anime Paradise Kiss and worked on his side project Sadesper Record, which released a full-length album earlier that year. In 2006, the band continued working on a new EP and album, both of which were released in mid-2007.

=== Outside projects ===
Narasaki, while being the leader of the band, has been an active musician in Japan. In 1998, he created the side project Sadesper Record which is more electronic based than Coaltar of the Deepers. In 2004, the second Sadesper Record album was released. He has also contributed to the band Tokusatsu in which the group created the soundtrack for the movie Stacy: Attack of the Schoolgirl Zombies.

Narasaki has also contributed to the shoegaze band Astrobrite. He contributed a remix of the track 'Snowflakes' to the spin-off of the video game Persona 4, Persona 4: Dancing All Night for the PlayStation Vita. Narasaki also takes credit for producing all the background music for the anime adaptation of Deadman Wonderland

== Members ==
=== Members ===
- Narasaki (Nackie) - Vocal, Guitar, Programming
- Kanno - Drums

=== Former members ===
- Watanabe - Vocals (left 1991)
- Takatori - Guitars (left 1992)
- Fifi - Vocals, Guitar (left 1995)
- Negishi - Guitars (left 1994)
- Nagasawa - Bass (left 1994)
- Koji - Guitar (left 1998, returned 2002)
- Ichimaki - Guitars, Backup Vocals (left 2001)
- Kawanaka - Bass (left 2007)

=== Support members ===
- Akira Nakayama - Guitars (from Plastic Tree)
- Koji - Guitars (from now-defunct Cocobat)
- Watchman - Keyboard, Percussion (ex-member of Melt-Banana, also takes part in helping NARASAKI with Sadesper Record)
- Kenjiro Murai - Bass (member of Cali Gari, current support as of 2007)

== Discography ==
=== Studio albums ===
- The Visitors from Deepspace (April 21, 1994)
- Submerge (March 25, 1998)
- Come Over to the Deepend (March 8, 2000)
- No Thank You (May 23, 2001)
- newave (February 28, 2002)
- Yukari Telepath (July 4, 2007)
- REVENGE OF THE VISITORS (January 27, 2021)

=== Collaboration albums ===
- hello there (w/ Boris, March 22, 2024)

=== EPs ===
- WHITE E.P. (December, 1991)
- Queen's Park all you change (October 25, 1992)
- SINKING SLOWLY (November 25, 1992)
- GUILTY FOREST (1994)
- CAT EP (January 31, 1997)
- CAT EP II (1997)
- RECEIVE E.P. (March 25, 1998)
- DOG e.p. (November 21, 1999)
- ROBOT EP (April 25, 2001)
- MOUSE E.P (November 2, 2004 - Limited Sale, Live Only)
- Penguin e.p (November 26, 2004)
- TORTOISE EP (May 23, 2007)
- BEAR EP (December 5, 2007 - Included with the EP Box Set 1991 -2007)
- RABBIT EP (November 14, 2018)
- SHEEP EP (March 21, 2025)

=== Singles ===
- DEAR FUTURE (August 31, 2011)
- SUBLIMATION (March 29, 2019)
- HALF LIFE (December 11, 2019)
- Pulsar Timing (November 20, 2024)

=== Compilations ===
- THE BREASTROKE (Best-Of) (December 16, 1998)
- THE BREASTROKE II (January 13, 2010)

=== DVD ===
- FOREVER (April 13, 2005)

=== Boxset ===
- Coaltar of the Deepers Ep Box Set 1991 -2007 (December 5, 2007)
  - Includes all except Penguin and Tortoise EPs.
