= Dangers (band) =

American hardcore punk band

- Origin: Los Angeles, California, U.S.
- Genres: Hardcore punk; punk rock
- Years active: 2005–present
- Labels: Topshelf, Vitriol, Dangers
- Members: Alfred Brown IV; Justin Smith; Jack Shirley; Chris Conde; Anthony Rivera
- Website: www.wearedangers.com

Dangers is an American hardcore punk band from Los Angeles, California, formed in 2005. They have released three EPs and three studio albums, most recently The Bend in the Break which came out in 2016 on Topshelf Records.

== History ==
Dangers formed in 2005, releasing a self-titled EP the same year. The following year, they released their debut full-length album Anger on Dangers Records. In 2010, they released their second album Messy, Isn't It? on Vitriol Records. In 2011, they appeared at Fluff Fest in the Czech Republic for the first time, returning in 2013 and 2015. In 2014, Dangers released their second EP Five O'Clock Shadows at the Edge of the Western World on Secret Voice. In 2016, they released their third album The Bend in the Break on Topshelf Records.

== Members ==
- Alfred Brown IV – vocals, spoken word
- Jack Shirley – lead guitar
- Justin Smith – rhythm guitar
- Chris Conde – bass
- Anthony Rivera – drums

== Former Members ==
- Justin Smith – guitar
- Earl Carrasco - bass
- Tim Culver – bass
- James Phillips – drums
- Alex McLeod – drums
- Curt Baer – guitar
- Adam Castle – drums
- Beezo - guitar
- Rollie Ulug - guitar and drums

== Discography ==
Studio albums

- Anger (2006, Dangers Records)
- Messy, Isn't It? (2010, Vitriol Records)
- The Bend in the Break (2016, Topshelf Records)

Demos, EPs, and Singles

- Demo (2005, Self-released)
- Dangers (2005, Old Guard Records)
- Five O'Clock Shadows at the Edge of the Western World (2014, Secret Voice)
- Kiss With Spit 7" (2016, Vitriol Records)
