= Dance Tonight! Revolution Tomorrow! =

Studio album by Orchid
- Released: December 4, 2000
- Recorded: December 1999
- Studio: God City (Salem, Massachusetts); Violins recorded at Dead Air (Amherst, Massachusetts)
- Genre: Screamo; emoviolence; hardcore punk
- Length: 15:39
- Label: Ebullition
- Producer: Kurt Ballou

Orchid chronology
Chaos Is Me (1999)	Dance Tonight! Revolution Tomorrow! (2000)	Gatefold (2002)

Professional ratings
Review scores
Source	Rating
AllMusic	4/5 stars
Sputnikmusic	4/5

Dance Tonight! Revolution Tomorrow! is the second studio album by American screamo band Orchid. It was released on 10" vinyl by Ebullition Records on December 4, 2000. The first press was limited to 5000 copies; 1000 each in red and yellow and 3000 in black. The second and third presses were limited to only 1000 clear copies and 70 blue copies. The fourth press had 1000 blue copies, 500 yellow copies, and 500 red copies. The entire album is also included on a 2002 box set, along with the album Chaos Is Me.

== Track listing ==
All tracks are written by Jayson Green.

No.	Title	Length
1.	"Destination: Blood!"	1:07
2.	"To Praise Prosthesis"	0:32
3.	"Lights Out"	2:12
4.	"Anna Karina"	0:14
5.	"I Am Nietzche"	2:38
6.	"Victory Is Ours"	0:56
7.	"Don't Rat Out Your Friends"	0:52
8.	"Black Hills"	0:44
9.	"Snow Delay at the Frankfurt School"	1:06
10.	"…And the Cat Turned to Smoke"	5:16

== Personnel ==
Orchid

- Geoff Garlock – bass guitar
- Jayson Green – lead vocals
- Jeffrey Salane – drums
- Will Killingsworth – guitar

Additional musicians

- Molly Sugarman – violin on track 10

Production

- Kurt Ballou – recording engineer, producer
- Will Killingsworth – recording engineer for the violin
