= Funeral Diner =

American screamo band

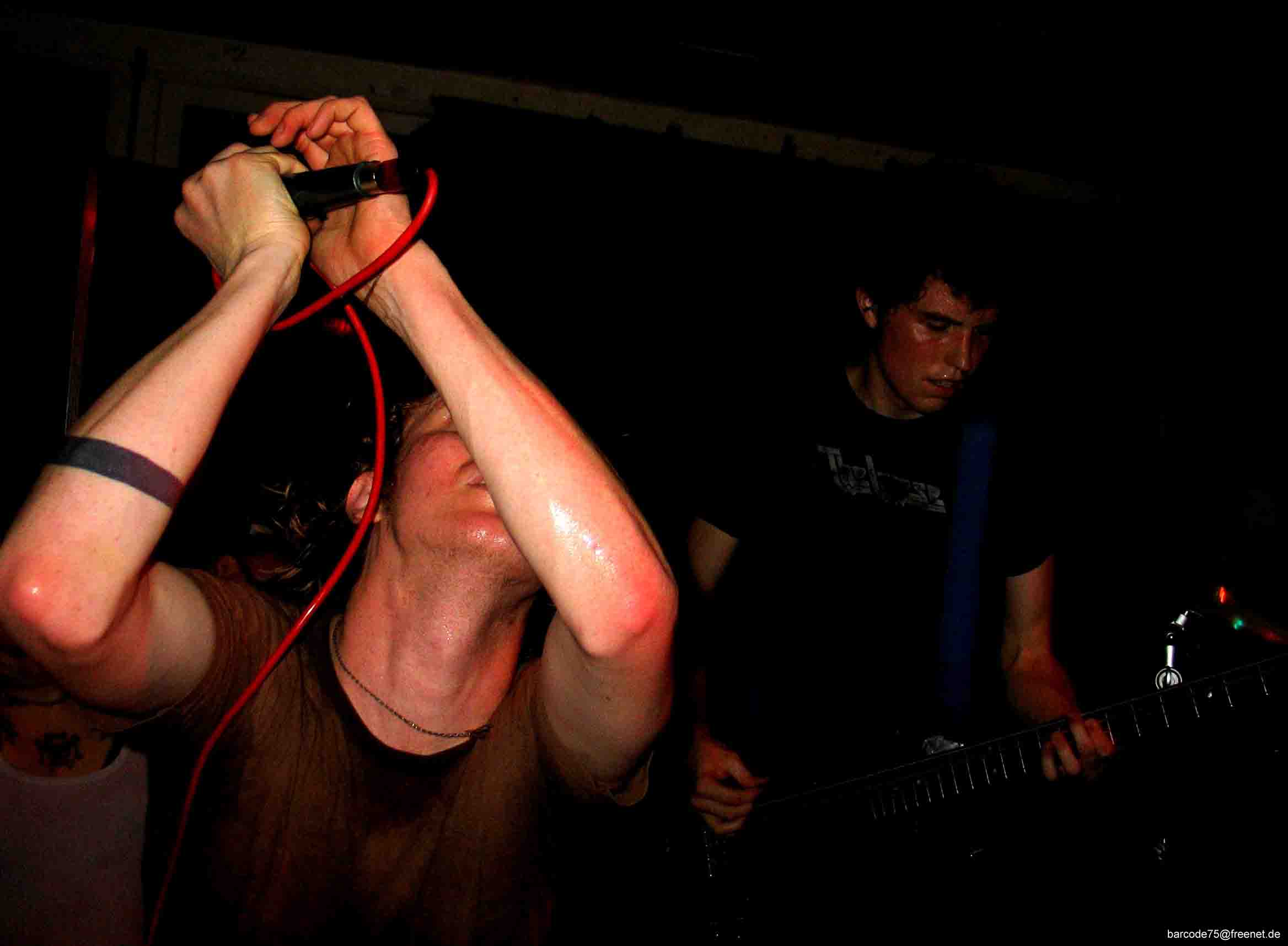
- Funeral Diner performing live in Münster, Germany, in 2005

Background information
- Origin: Half Moon Bay, California, U.S.
- Genres: Screamo; emo; post-hardcore; post-rock
- Years active: 1998–2007
- Labels: Old Glory; Ape Must Not Kill Ape; Sorry; LilacSky; Electric Human Project; Vendetta; Alone
- Past members: Seth Babb; Dan Bajda; Matt Bajda; Dave Mello; Ben Steidel; Sean O' Shea; Rob Beckstrom; Andy Radin; Phil Benson

Funeral Diner was an American screamo band from Half Moon Bay, California, located near San Francisco, that was active from 1998 to 2007. During their last few years as a band, they established a strong cult fanbase through a near constant string of releases and a touring schedule during which they visited the United States, Europe, and Japan.

The band had a large catalog of splits and compilation tracks on various records. They rarely ever pressed CDs, and kept many of their releases in limited quantities and one-time pressings, jumping from label to label. However, their last few major recordings were released by Alone Records. Their final full-length studio album, The Underdark, was released on Alone in 2005.

Members of the band were previously affiliated with other groups, such as Nexus Six, Portraits of Past, Living War Room, Lost Ground, Sheep Squeeze, and Takaru. After the groups breakup, members went on to form various acts, including Stirling Says, ...Who Calls So Loud, Pills, and Lemonade.

Though rooted in first wave emo, hardcore punk and early screamo characteristics, the band later included elements of post-rock. Funeral Diner's albums have attracted significant coverage from rock press outlets.

== Members ==
Final lineup

- David Manuel Mello – guitar (1998–2007)
- Daniel Patrick Bajda – guitar (1998–2007), vocals (1998–1999, 2000–2002)
- Matthew Martin Bajda – drums (1998–2007)
- Seth Robert Babb – vocals (2002–2007)
- Benjamin Rutledge Steidel – bass (2002–2007)

Former members

- Sean O'Shea – bass (1998–1999)
- Rob Prevail – bass (1999–2000)
- Phil Benson – vocals (1999–2000)
- Andrew Michael Radin – bass (2000–2002)

== Discography ==
Studio albums

Title	Album Details	Notes
Difference Of Potential	Released: August 2002 (CD) September 2003 (LP); Label: Ape Must Not Kill Ape; Formats: CD, LP	LP edition limited to 1000 black colored copies
The Underdark	Released: March 2005; Label: Alone Records; Formats: CD, LP	First issued through Alone Records in April 2005 on CD and vinyl formats. First vinyl pressing included black and clear vinyl, 1200 copies of the black vinyl and an unknown number of copies of the clear vinyl. Also unknown amount pressed on white vinyl. In 2015, to celebrate the album's tenth anniversary, Repeater Records reissue the album on grey colored vinyl, 524 copies total.

Extended plays

Title	Album Details	Notes
The Wicked	Released: August 2002 (CD) May 2004 (10"); Label: Sorry Records Alone Records; Formats: CD, 10"	First released in August 2002 on CD format through Sorry Records. Later reissued on CD and 10" vinyl formats in 2004 through Alone Records with different artwork and an extra track.
Swept Under	Released: June 25, 2005; Label: LilacSky Records, Audio Is A War (10") Cosmic Note Records (CD); Formats: CD, 10"	10" edition issued through both LilacSky Records and Audio Is A War. CD edition, issued by Cosmic Note Records, includes different artwork and extra remixed versions of Funeral Diner tracks appended to the end.
Bag Of Holding	Released: March 2006; Label: Self-released; Formats: 3" CD	Tour edition EP released as a home burned 3" CD. Edition of 75, all copies hand-numbered. Featured tracks from their split with Ampere and from The Emo Apocalypse compilation.
Doors Open	Released: March 2007; Label: Self-released (CD) Vendetta Records, Adagio830 (12"); Formats: CD, 12"	CD edition independently released by the band for their 2007 Japan tour. The single-sided 12" edition was released between Vendetta Records and Adagio830 in Germany. This edition included different artwork from the CD edition and was released in edition of 600 black colored copies.

Split releases

Title	Album Details	Notes
Nexus Six/Funeral Diner	Released: January 1999; Label: Old Glory Records; Format: LP	Edition of 1000 black colored copies. Split with Nexus Six.
The World of Forms	Released: August 2000; Label: Ape Must Not Kill Ape; Format: LP	Edition of 1000 black colored copies, 50 of which came packaged in hand-stamped sleeves. Split with Staircase.
The Shivering/Funeral Diner	Released: November 2001; Label: Into The Hurricane Unfun Records City Boot Records; Format: LP	Edition of 600 hand-numbered black colored copies. Split with The Shivering.
A Split Seven Inch	Released: October 2002; Label: Vendetta Records; Format: 7"	Three pressings total: 525 make up the first, 440 for the second, and 520 for the third, all of which adding up to 1485 black colored vinyl copies total. The second and third pressings were hand-numbered. Split with Zann. The song "Lie In Headlights" is the only song from a split release to not be compiled in any of the band's compilation releases.
Music Inspired by Rites of Spring Part One	Released: September 2003; Label: Fire Walk With Me; Format: 7"	Rites of Spring tribute 7" split with the Saddest Landscape. Edition of 780 black colored copies.
Dead City/Funeral Diner	Released: September 2003; Label: Old Glory Records So Much To Give; Format: LP	1000 black colored copies and about 140 test pressings. About 130 of the test pressings were sold by Dead City on tour with unique artwork and inserts. About 12 copies were packaged in manilla envelopes and had artwork done by Dan Davis of Kodan Armada. Including these two "artwork variations", about 6 different variations of artwork exist for this release. Split with Dead City.
I Just Want To Feel This Way Forever	Released: June 2004 (CD) May 2005 (10"); Label: Falling Leaves (CD) Somberlain (10"); Format: CD, 10"	First issued as a CD through Falling Leaves in 2004. Reissued on 10" vinyl format through Somberlain with alternative artwork in 2005 as an edition of 675: 340 black, 335 mint-green. Split with Evylock.
A Seven Inch Split	Released: June 2004; Label: Red Cars Go Faster Records; Format: 7"	Edition of 1030 copies: 570 black, 460 champagne clear. 141 of the black copies were hand-numbered European tour editions, and 123 of the clear copies were hand-numbered as well. All copies of the split were pressed on thick 70 gram vinyl. Split with Raein.
Welcome The Plague Year/Funeral Diner	Released: July 2004; Label: Electric Human Project; Format: 7"	2000 copies total: 1000 blue, 700 black, 200 clear, and 100 white. Split with Welcome The Plague Year.
Ampere/Funeral Diner	Released: July 2007; Label: Clean Plate Records, Electric Human Project; Format: 9"	Released in edition of 1000: 800 black, 200 green. All copies were actually single-sided with etching all over the B-side and some even on the A-side. Split with Ampere.

Compilation albums

Title	Album Details	Notes
Three Sides Dead	Released: September 2003; Label: LilacSky Records; Formats: CD	Compilation album composed of all of Funeral Diner's tracks from their splits with Nexus Six, Staircase, and The Shivering.
...Is Dead	Released: September 2003; Label: Self-released; Formats: CD-R	Tour edition homeburned CD-R, edition of 200. Sold through the band's 2003 European tour. Compilation composed of tracks that will later appear on their splits with Evylock, Raein, and Welcome The Plague Year.

Compilation Appearances

Title	Album Details	Song
Inspiration From Forest	Released: November 2004; Label: Falling Leaves; Formats: CD	"Shifting"
A Sequel Of A Story	Released: August 2003 (CD) February 2004 (LP); Label: Cosmic Note (CD) City Boot Records, Correlation Records, Coldbringer Recordings (LP); Formats: CD, LP	"This Truly Is God's Country"
The Emo Apocalypse	Released: May 2006; Label: React With Protest; Formats: LP	"Addendum"
Droning Earth Vol. 4	Released: October 2008; Label: Droning Earth; Formats: DL	"Two Houses"

== Associated Acts ==
- Stirling Says - Seth Robert Babb
- ...Who Calls So Loud - Matthew Martin Bajda, David Manuel Mello
- Portraits of Past - Matthew Martin Bajda
- Nexus Six - David Manuel Mello, Daniel Patrick Bajda, Matthew Martin Bajda
- Lemonade - Benjamin Rutledge Steidel
- Sheep Squeeze
- Living War Room
- Lost Ground
- Takaru - Seth Robert Babb
- Pills - Seth Robert Babb
