= Raein =

Italian hardcore punk band

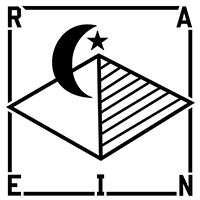
- Raein logo

Background information
- Origin: Italy
- Genres: Screamo; emoviolence; hardcore punk
- Years active: 2002–2005, 2007–present
- Members: Alessio Valmori; Andrea Console; Giuseppe Coluccelli; Nicola Amadori; Michele Camorani
- Past members: Marco Montesano; Taylor; Riccardo Bresciani
- Website: www.raein.eu

Raein is an Italian hardcore punk band that includes members of La Quiete, and the post-rock band Neil on Impression. The band broke up in late 2005, but after 2-year hiatus (during which they played 2 shows) they regrouped in September 2007.

Raein is often credited for bringing the screamo genre to Europe following its peak in the United States, during the careers of bands in the genre such as Orchid and Saetia.

== History ==
In 2008, Raein released a new album, embarking on an extensive international tour in 2009 to support the new release.

In 2011 they released their album Sulla linea dell'orizzonte fra questa mia vita e quella di tutti for free on their website.

At the beginning of 2013, the band once again embarked on an extensive tour of the US, UK, Canada and Puerto Rico, playing 20 shows in 22 days. In April a 7" split with Loma Prieta was released on Deathwish Inc. records.

Raein 4th studio album Perpeetum was released on April 30, 2015, through their Facebook page, followed by an 8" split with Ampere. That year they appeared at Fluff Fest in the Czech Republic for the third time after 2008 and 2011.

== Band members ==
Current

- Alessio Valmori: guitar, vocals (2002–present)
- Andrea Console: vocals (2002–present)
- Giuseppe Coluccelli: guitar, vocals (2002–present)
- Nicola Amadori: bass (2009–present)
- Michele Camorani: drums (2002–present)

Former

- Marco Montesano: bass (2002–2009)
- Taylor
- Riccardo Bresciani: guitar

== Discography ==
Studio Album

| Year | Album details |
|---|---|
| 2002 | Raein: Released: August 1, 2002; Labels: Life of Hate Records |
| 2003 | Il N'y A Pas De Orchestre: Released: February 4, 2003; Labels: Ape Must Not Kill Ape, React With Protest |
| 2008 | Ogni Nuovo Inizio: Released: 2008; Labels: Sons of Vesta, Ape Must Not Kill Ape |
| 2011 | Sulla linea dell'orizzonte fra questa mia vita e quella di tutti: Released: June 20, 2011; Labels: Self-Release |
| 2025 | Forme Sommerse: Released: October 24, 2025; Labels: Persistent Vision Records |

Compilation Album

| Year | Album details |
|---|---|
| 2005 | Discography 2000-2004: Released: October 1, 2005; Labels: Bullwhip Records, Papakerma |
| 2011 | Ah, As If...: Released: February 1, 2011; Labels: Sons of Vesta, Wormwood Label |
| 2024 | A Collection of Splits and EPs 2004 - 2015: Released: August 16, 2024; Labels: Persistent Vision Records |

EP

| Year | Album details |
|---|---|
| 2004 | Döden Marscherar Åt Väst 7": Released: August 1, 2004; Labels: Release the Bats Records |
| 2004 | From 3 To 1 In 2 And 4 (Remix): Released: 2004; Labels: Self-Release |
| 2008 | Nati Da Altri Padri/Ogni Nuovo Inizio: Released: December 16, 2008; Labels: Sons of Vesta |
| 2015 | Perpetuum: Released: April 29, 2015; Labels: Self-Release |

Split

| Year | Album details |
|---|---|
| 2004 | Raein/Phoenix Bodies 7": Released: January, 2004; Labels: Crucificados Pelo Sistema, Init Records; Split with: Phoenix Bodies |
| 2004 | Raein/Funeral Diner 7": Released: June, 2004; Labels: Red Cars Go Faster Records; Split with: Funeral Diner |
| 2004 | The Harsh Words As The Sun: Released: October, 2004; Labels: oto Records, Satire Records; Split with: Lhasa & Daïtro |
| 2004 | Raein/Daïtro 10": Released: November 3, 2004; Labels: PurePainSugar, Ape Must Not Kill Ape; Split with: Daïtro |
| 2013 | Loma Prieta/Raein 7": Released: May 14, 2013; Labels: Deathwish Inc.; Split with: Loma Prieta |
| 2015 | Raein/Ampere 7": Released: August 7, 2015; Labels: No Idea Records; Split with: Ampere |

Compilations

| Year | Album details |
|---|---|
| 2004 | This Is Your Life: Released: Late 2004; Labels: Ape Must Not Kill Ape |
| 2004 | Verso La Fine: Released: 2004; Labels: |
| 2005 | The Emo Armageddon: Released: February 11, 2005; Labels: React with Protest |
| 2015 | Viscere Vol. III: Released: April 15, 2015; Labels: Stop Records, Lafine, Upwind, Sciroppo Dischi |
