= Vs Self =

American musical group

- Origin: Apple Valley, California, U.S.
- Genres: Midwest emo; screamo
- Years active: 2018–present
- Members: Kyle Schlenker; Greg Sandoval; Chris Gregory
- Past members: Frankie Lopez; Dante Garcia II
- Website: vsself.bandcamp.com

Vs Self (/vɜːrs sɛlf/ VERSE-self) is an American emo band from Apple Valley, California. Formed in 2018, the band consists of Kyle Schlenker (guitar, vocals), Dante Garcia II (tambourine, vocals) and Frankie Lopez (drums, vocals). Their music merges Midwest emo instruments with the vocal style of screamo. They have released one full-length album, three split EPs and one demo.

The band was formed by Kyle Schlenker (guitar, vocals), Dante Garcia II (tambourine, vocals) and Greg Sandoval (drums), they released their first demo in 2019. Their debut album Everything Seems Better Now was released in 2020. During the early 2020s, the band saw viral success through the use of their music on TikTok, leading them to become one of the most prominent bands in the 2020s wave of screamo. In 2022, they released a split EP with Knumears. Around 2023, Sandoval departed from the band, replaced by Frankie Lopez. The next year, they released a split EP with Catalyst, Party Hats and Knumears, following 2026 by another with Soccer.

== History ==
Formed in Apple Valley, California in 2018, consisting of Kyle Schlenker (guitar, vocals), Dante Garcia II (tambourine, vocals) and Greg Sandoval (drums, vocals). Their name was derived from the "vs self" concept of narrative conflict. Schlenker heard this term in a high school English lesson and began using it as his Instagram handle. Performing the band, they felt it to be an appropriate name. After performing live only twice, they released their demo in 2019.

Released their debut album Everything Seems Better Now on April 4, 2020. On February 22, 2022, they released a split EP with Knumear. By 2023, the band consisted of Schlenker and drummer Frankie Lope. On April 15, 2024, they released a split EP with Catalyst, Party Hats and Knumears. By 2025, its members had dispersed to South Pasadena, California and Upland, California, rehearsing in Pomona, California. On 11 and 18 April, they performed at Coachella Festival. Between March 29 and May 2, 2024, they headlined a tour of the United States, with support from Knumears, upnow! and Party Hats. In fall 2024, they performed at Best Friends Forever festival. On January 5, 2026, they released a split EP with Japanese band Soccer. They performed at Noise Pop Festival in February 2026. Between February 8 and March 14, 2026, they supported La Dispute on their European headline tour, alongside Pijn.

== Musical style ==
Critics have categorized Vs Self's music as screamo, Midwest emo and Midwest screamo. They incorporate elements of hardcore punk, jazz and mathcore.

The band's music takes from the sound of screamo's first-wave, as well as early emocore such as Indian Summer, Boys Life and Embrace. Out of Rage called their style a fusion of "Midwest emo and new-school screamo". Their music makes use of dual lead vocals, both sung and screamed. Instrumentally, they use twinkly, technical guitar playing contrasted by heavy parts, instricate drum parts and tamborine. Their guitars make use of reverb effects. Their lyrics focus on personal identity.

Schlenker has cited Hop Along vocalist Frances Quinlan as a major lyrical inspiration, and Victor Villareal as a guitar inspiration. Other influences including Explosions in the Sky.

Vs Self are a part of the 2020s wave of screamo alongside Widowdusk and Your Arms Are My Cocoon. Experienced viral success on TikTok, bringing greater attention to the genre and helping to build a scene revival fanbase. BrooklynVegan editor Andrew Sacher said this movement is called "TikTok screamo", noting Vs Self as one of its "best and fastest-rising bands", alongside Catalyst, Knumears and Party Hats. Coachella Valley Independent writer Matt King called vocalist Kyle Schlenker "a prominent figure in modern mathcore and screamo music." KCSC radio called Everything Seems Better Now "An essential album for those looking for an intro to Midwest-Emo and Screamo".

== Members ==
Current

- Kyle Schlenker – guitar, vocals (2018–present)
- Greg Sandoval – drums, vocals (2018–2023) bass, vocals (2026-present)
- Chris Gregory – drums (2026-present)

Former

- Dante Garcia II – tambourine, vocals (2018–2026)
- Frankie Lopez – drums, vocals (2023–2026)

== Discography ==
Studio albums

- Everything Seems Better Now (2020)

EPs

- Split (2022, split EP with Knumears)
- 4-Way Split (2024; split EP with Catalyst, Party Hats and Knumears)
- vs self / Soccer. (2026; split EP with Soccer)

Demos

- Demo (2019)
