= Daïtro =

French screamo band

- Origin: Lyon, France
- Genre: Screamo
- Years active: 2000-2012
- Labels: Alchimia, Purepainsugar, Music Fear Satan, Adagio830, Oto Records, Clean Plate, Echo Canyon Records
- Members: Julien Paget; Samuel Moncharmont; Gwenaël Grosclaude; Benoît Desvignes; Aurelien Verdant
- Website: www.daitro.com

Daïtro was a French screamo band from Lyon. They formed in 2000 as a four-piece band, but following the departure of their original bass player, Gwen and Aurelien joined, and they played as a five-piece from then on. The line-up consists of lead singer Aurelien Verdant, guitarist and singer Julien Paget, bassist Gwenaël Grosclaude, guitarist Samuel Moncharmont (1981–2021) and drummer Benoît Desvignes. They announced in 2012 that they were breaking up, and most of the members have moved on to other musical endeavours.

== Music style ==
Daïtro plays a brand of chaotic hardcore punk that closely resembles that of the original screamo movement of the 1990s. They share many stylistic similarities with American bands like Orchid, as well as with other bands from the European screamo (or "skramz") scene such as Raein, La Quiete and Sed non-Satiata. Their influences include several earlier screamo and post-hardcore bands, including At the Drive-In, Refused and Envy.

Daïtro, along with many of their European and American contemporaries, were hugely inspirational to a new generation of screamo and post-hardcore bands that appeared in the late 2000s and early 2010s, such as Pianos Become the Teeth and Touché Amoré.

== Discography ==
Studio albums

- 2003 – Des Cendres, Je Me Consumme CD (Alchimia/Music Fear Satan)
- 2005 – Laissez Vivre Les Squelettes LP/CD (Last Day Of June/Purepainsugar)
- 2009 – Y LP/CD (Purepainsugar)

EPs

- 2002 – Daïtro 7" (Alchimia)
- 2007 – US Tour 7" (Clean Plate)

Splits

- 2004 – Raein / Daïtro 10" (ApeMustNotKillApe/Purepainsugar)
- 2004 – The Harsh Words as the Sun CD with Raein and Lhasa (Oto Records/Satire Records)
- 2007 – Ampere / Daïtro 7" (Clean Plate/Purepainsugar)
- 2007 – Daïtro / Sed Non Satiata LP/CD (Flower of Carnage/Puzzle/Adagio830)

Compilations

- 2005 – 02–05 Retrospective CD (self-released)
- 2007 – 2002–2005 Discography tape (Alchimia)
- 2008 – 2004–2007 Discography tape (Utarid Tapes)
- 2010 – Vinyl Collected LP (Adagio830)

Compilation appearances

- 2004 – "Des Visages et des Muscles" in This Is Your Life
- 2005 – "Vivre Ici" in The Emo Armageddon
