= Ampere (band) =

American screamo band

- Origin: Amherst, Massachusetts, U.S.
- Genres: Screamo
- Years active: 2002–present
- Labels: Ebullition Records, No Idea
- Members: Will Killingsworth; Meghan Minior; Stephen Pierce; Andy Skelly

Ampere is an American hardcore punk band from Amherst, Massachusetts known for their short but extremely loud and intense live shows. The band has put the importance of DIY punk ethics at the forefront of their lyrics and are known for the particular attention they bring to their vegan principles.

== History ==
Members of the band have been involved in the DIY punk scene for a number of years, with the most notable being guitarist Will Killingsworth, who played in Orchid and Bucket Full of Teeth. Andy Skelly played in Wolves, as well as The Last Forty Seconds, with Stephen pierce.

The band actively tour in the US and completed a tour of Europe with Sinaloa in March 2006. A split record on Ebullition Records between the two bands was released in time for the tour, along with a 7-inch of their early recordings and a four-way split 11-inch with Death to Tyrants, Wasteland and Daniel Striped Tiger which was recorded live at Dead Air.

2007 was a productive year for the band, encompassing a brief tour in Japan as well as three new split records; a 6-inch with Ringers on No Idea Records, a 9-inch with Funeral Diner released by Clean Plate and The Electric Human Project, as well as a 7-inch picture disk with Daitro on Clean Plate and Purepainsugar.

In 2008, they released an Australian-tour-only 7-inch split with Off Minor. Both bands contributed previously compilation-exclusive songs from Keep Singing! A Benefit Compilation for Compassion Over Killing.

In June 2011, the band released their second album "Like Shadows" on No Idea Records.

In August 2015, they released an 8-inch split with Raein on No Idea Records.

== Members ==
- Will Killingsworth – guitar
- Meghan Minior – bass
- Stephen Pierce – vocals
- Andy Skelly – drums

== Discography ==
Studio albums

- All Our Tomorrows End Today 10-inch/3-inch CD (2004, Ebullition Records)
- Like Shadows (2011, No Idea Records)

Splits

- Ampere/Wolves Split 7-inch 2003 (Moganono Records)
- Ampere/Welcome the Plague Year split 5-inch 2005 (Clean Plate/Turnstile)
- Ampere/Death to Tyrants/Wasteland/Daniel Striped Tiger split 11-inch 2006 (Clean Plate)
- Ampere/Sinaloa Split LP/CD 2006 (Ebullition)
- Ampere/Das Oath Split LP+CD 2006 (Self-released)
- Ampere/Daitro Split 7-inch picture disc 2007 (Clean Plate/purepainsugar)
- Ampere/Ringers Split 6-inch/7-inch 2007 (No Idea Records)
- Ampere/Funeral Diner Split 9-inch 2007 (Clean Plate/Electric Human Project)
- Ampere/Off Minor Split 7-inch 2008 (Yellow Ghost)
- Ampere/Raein Split 2015

Demo and Compilations

- Demo 7-inch/Tape 2002 (Self-Released)
- First Recordings 7-inch(Contains Demo and split with Wolves) 2006 (purepainsugar)
- The First Five Years CD 2008 (Yellow Ghost)

Compilation appearances

- "Escapism" on No Idea Presents: Fest 6 (2007, No Idea Records)
- "Conquest Success" on Keep Singing! A Benefit Compilation for Compassion Over Killing (2008, Exotic Fever Records)
