= Off Minor (band) =

American post-hardcore band

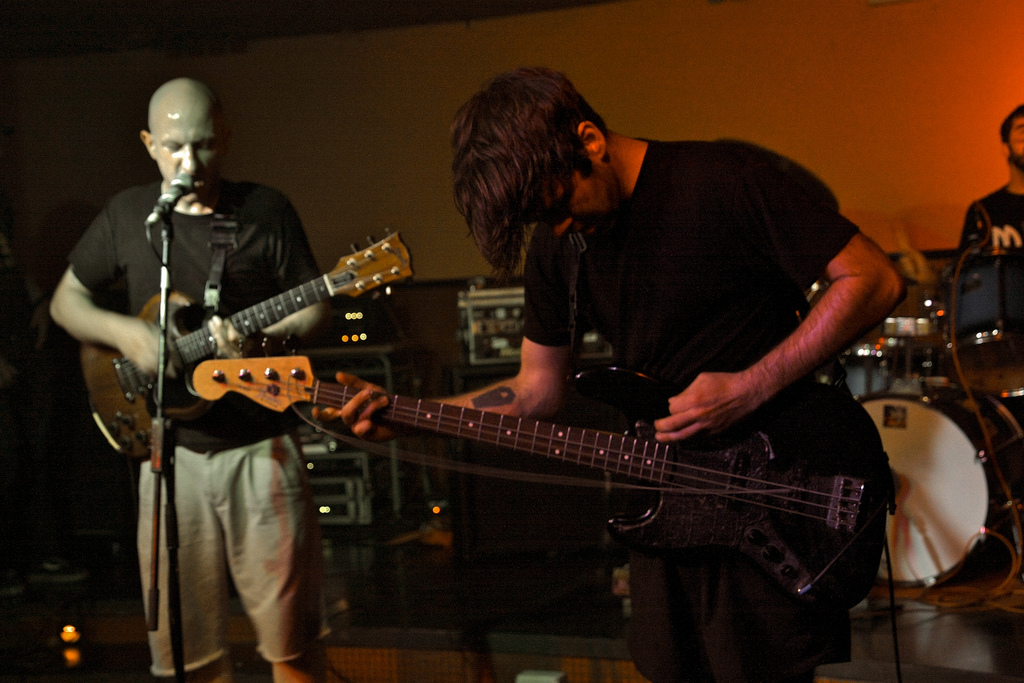
- Off Minor performing in Barcelona on June 3, 2008.

Background information
- Origin: New York City, United States
- Genres: Post-hardcore; emo; math rock; jazzcore
- Years active: 1999–2008
- Labels: Level Plane Records, Paramnesia Records, Golden Brown Recordings, Clean Plate Records, EarthWaterSky Connection
- Spinoff of: Saetia
- Members: Jamie Behar; Steven Roche; Kevin Roche
- Past members: Matt Smith

Off Minor were an American post-hardcore band from New York City, United States. They formed in 1999 with Jamie Behar, Matt Smith, and Steven Roche, all former Saetia members. However, Smith later left and was replaced by Steven's brother Kevin on bass. The band was known for incorporating elements of hardcore punk, emo, and math rock, and they were heavily influenced by jazz, reggae, and ska.

Since their formation the band has released three albums and six splits/extended plays on several indie labels, including Level Plane Records, Golden Brown Records, and Paramnesia Records. Their last album Some Blood was released physically and digitally on a donation system. They have toured countries such as Europe, Australia, Asia, and the United States. They take their name from a Thelonious Monk song. Their 2003 debut The Heat Death of the Universe was named as the 84th-best album released in the 2000s by Sputnikmusic.

Steven Roche owns and operates Permanent Hearing Damage Recording Studios in Philadelphia. Kevin and Steven Roche currently play in Bore War. Jamie Behar is practicing medicine in New York City and currently plays in Lytic. Members of the band have gone on to play in groups such as Yo Man, Go!, Ampere, and Ordinary Lives.

== Members ==
=== Current ===
- Jamie Behar – vocals, guitar (1999–2008)
- Kevin Roche – bass (2001–2008)
- Steven Roche – vocals, drums (1999–2008)

=== Past ===
- Matt Smith – bass (1999–2001)

== Discography ==
=== Studio albums ===
- The Heat Death of the Universe (January 28, 2003, EarthWaterSky Connection/Clean Plate)
- Innominate (August 24, 2004, EarthWaterSky Connection/Golden Brown)
- Some Blood (July 1, 2008, Parmanesia/Narshardaa/Purepainsugar)

=== EPs ===
- Off Minor/I Am The Resurrection split LP (2000, Level Plane)
- Problematic Courtship CD (2002, Golden Brown) (features tracks from their split with I am the Resurrection as well as live recordings)
- Off Minor/Life Detecting Coffins split 7-inch (2003, EarthWaterSky Connection)
- Off Minor/St. Alban's Kids split 7-inch (2005, Appliances & Cars/Kickstart My Heart)
- Off Minor/My Disco split 7-inch (2005, Golden Brown)
- Off Minor/Killie split 2×CD (2008, oto)
- Off Minor/Ampere split 7-inch (2008, Yellow Ghost)

=== Compilation albums ===
- The Heat Death of the Universe + Problematic Courtship (2002, EarthWaterSky Connection)

=== Compilation appearances ===
- Summertime (2000, Kordova Milk Bar)
- Building Records Presents 60 Songs (2003, Building)
- Keep Singing! A Benefit Compilation for Compassion Over Killing (2008, Exotic Fever)
