= Heaven in Her Arms =

Japanese post-hardcore band from Tokyo

- Origin: Tokyo, Japan
- Genres: Post-hardcore; post-metal; screamo
- Years active: 2001–present
- Labels: Daymare; Moment of Collapse; Translation Loss
- Members: Kent Aoki; Takayuki Ryuzaki; Katsuta; Kentaro; Hiroki Watanabe
- Website: heaveninherarms.com

Heaven in Her Arms are a Japanese post-hardcore band from Tokyo. Named after a song from Converge's 2001 album Jane Doe, they have released 3 studio albums, 2 EPs and 6 splits since 2005. In a positive review of the band's 2017 album White Halo, Pitchfork writer Andy O'Connor described their style as an amalgamation of extreme metal, post-rock, and 1990s emo. He compared them to fellow Tokyo band Envy and named both bands a strong influence on their one-time tour-mates Deafheaven. Originally signed in 2010 to SONZAI RECORDS in 2010, as of 2020, Heaven in Her Arms are signed to Daymare Recordings in Japan, Moment of Collapse Records in Europe, and Translation Loss in North America.

== Members ==
Current members

- Kent Aoki – guitar, vocals
- Katsuta – guitar
- Kentaro – bass
- Hiroki "Rocky" Watanabe – drums

Past members

- Takayuki Ryuzaki – guitar (2001–2019)

== Discography ==
Studio albums

- 黒斑の侵蝕 / Erosion of the Black Speckle (2007)
- 幻月 / Paraselene (2010)
- 白暈 / White Halo (2017)
- 浄化はおわる / The End of Purification (2026)

EPs

- Heaven in Her Arms (2006)
- 被覆する閉塞 / Duplex Coated Obstruction (2009)

Splits

- Heaven in Her Arms / In Between (2005)
- Heaven in Her Arms / Tomato Steal (2006)
- Koenji (with Killie) (2007)
- Heaven in Her Arms / Aussitôt Mort (2011)
- Heaven in Her Arms / Yumi (2012)
- 刻光 (with Cohol) (2013)
