= Circle Takes the Square =

American screamo band

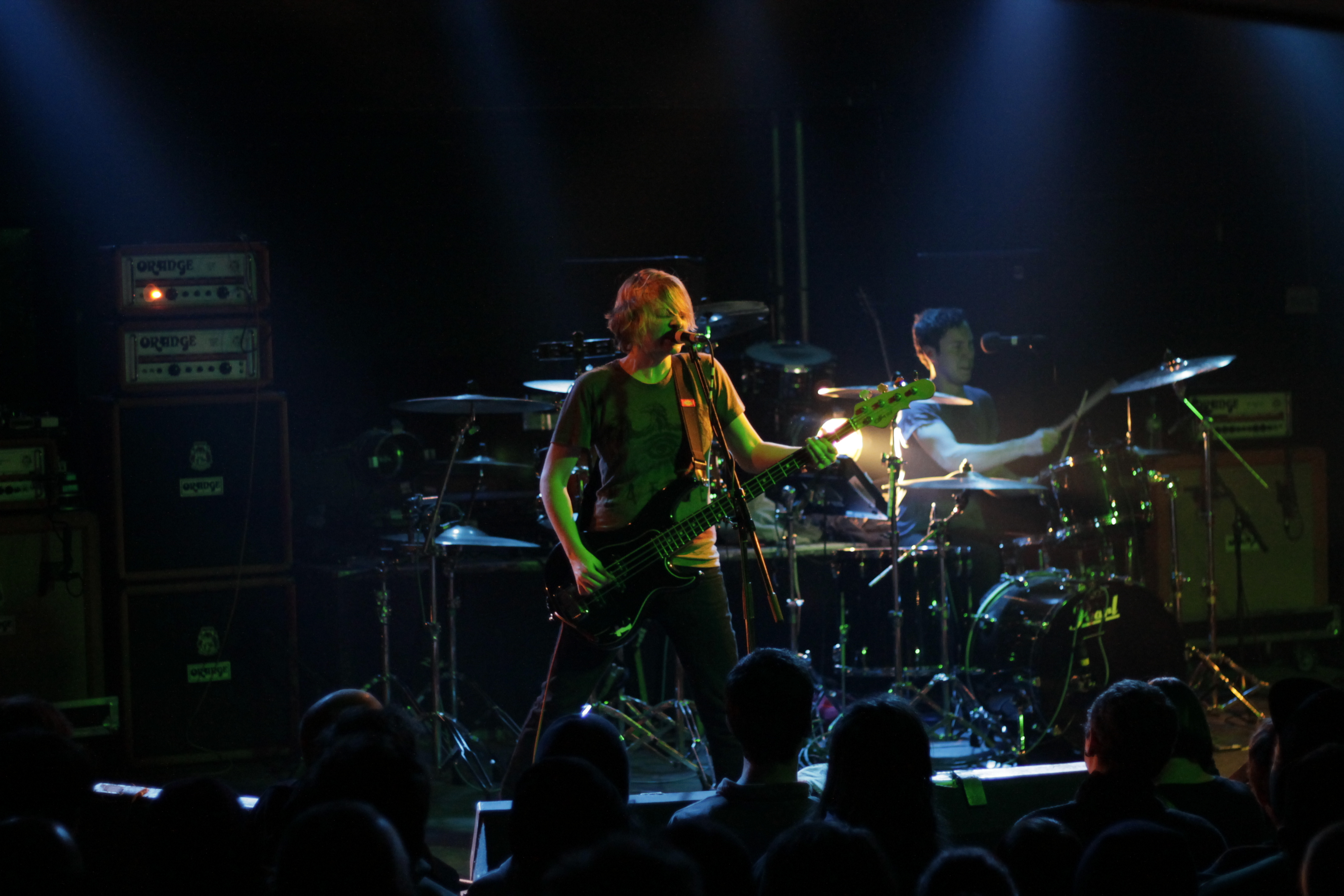
- Kathleen Stubelek (front) and Caleb Collins (back) performing in Leipzig, Germany in 2012

Background information
- Origin: Savannah, Georgia, U.S.
- Genres: Screamo, post-hardcore, experimental rock
- Years active: 1999–present
- Labels: Gatepost Recordings, Robotic Empire, HyperRealist, Perpetual Motion Machine
- Members: Drew Speziale; Kathleen Stubelek; Caleb Collins
- Past members: David Rabitor; Jay Wynne; Bobby Scandiffio; Josh Ortega; Colin Kelly; Robbie Rose
- Website: www.circletakesthesquare.com

Circle Takes the Square is an American screamo band from Savannah, Georgia. It is composed of founding members Drew Speziale and Kathleen Stubelek, as well as Caleb Collins. Their debut release was a 6-track self-titled EP released in 2001, followed by a 7" split with Pg. 99 in 2002. In 2004, they released their debut studio album As the Roots Undo on Robotic Empire, which released the CD, and HyperRealist Records, which released the gatefold LP. The album gained them considerable acclaim and the band toured extensively to promote it during the year. This included a six-week east coast tour that took the band into Canada for the first time, supported by Arkata and Raise Them And Eat Them. The band's second album, Decompositions: Volume Number One, was released after an 8-year silence on December 21, 2012, as a digital download; physical editions of the album were released in April 2013.

== Musical style ==
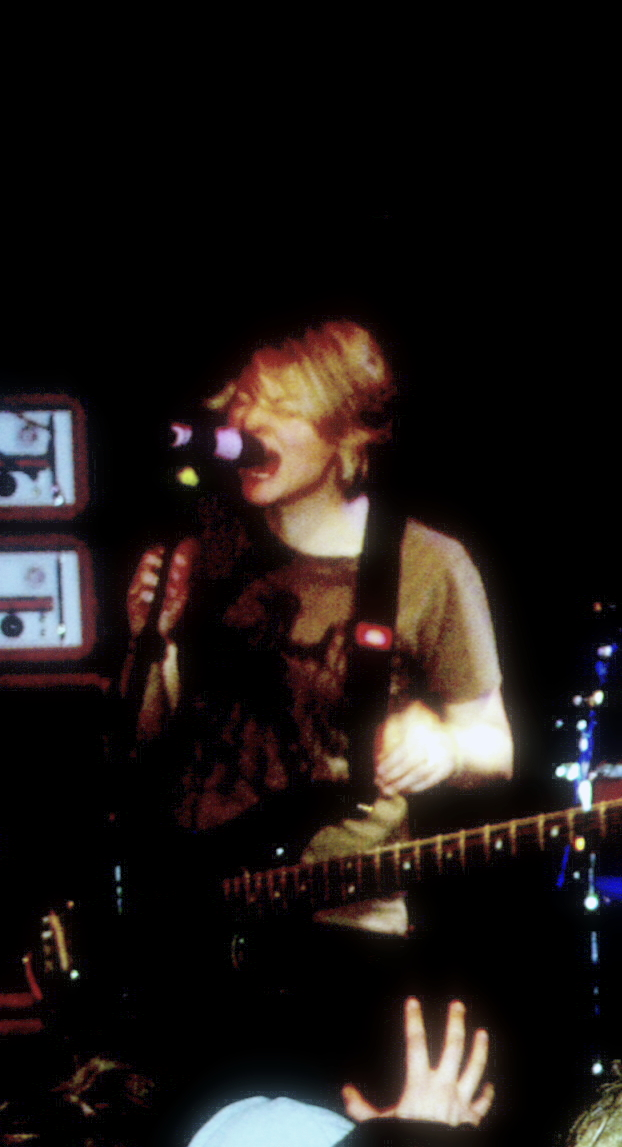
Stubelek performing with Circle Takes the Square at The House of Culture in Stockholm, Sweden in 2012

Ben Sailer of Noisey wrote that As the Roots Undo has long garnered praise from both the press and fans alike for its forward-thinking blend of 90s screamo, fractured grindcore, and experimental post-rock. Metal Injection described their style as a "blend of progressive experimentation and DIY hardcore, metal, and noise [...] characterized by a natural fusion of the off-the-wall structures of grindcore and the sweeping guitar dynamics of post-punk". The band themselves have described the sound as "...a punk rock band with reverence for the Mystery." Andrew Sacher of BrooklynVegan wrote, "In a genre that’s built on chaos, Savannah, Georgia screamo band Circle Takes The Square emerged as even more chaotic than most of the rest."

== Legacy ==
Metal Injection called Circle Takes the Square "legendary". Writing for NPR music, Lars Gotrich credited Circle Takes the Square alongside Pg. 99, Orchid and Majority Rule as pioneers of emotional post-hardcore.

== Members ==
Current

- Drew Speziale – guitars, strings, piano, keyboard, vocals (1999–present)
- Kathleen Coppola Stubelek – bass, vocals (1999–present)
- Caleb Collins – drums, percussion, samples, programming, synthesizers (2007–present)
- Anthony Stubelek - live production (2004–present)

Former

- Robbie Rose – vocals (1999–2000)
- Collin Kelly – guitar (1999–2002)
- Jay Wynne – drums, percussion (1999–2005)
- Bobby Scandiffio – guitar (2004–2006; died 2011)
- Josh Ortega – drums, percussion (2005–2007)
- David Rabitor – guitars, backing vocals (2007–2013)

Timeline

== Discography ==
Studio albums

- As the Roots Undo (2004, Robotic Empire/HyperRealist)
- Decompositions: Volume Number One (2012, Gatepost Recordings)

EPs

- Circle Takes the Square (2001, self-released/HyperRealist)
- Document #13: Pyramids in Cloth (split w/Pg. 99, August 2002, Perpetual Motion Machine)
- Decompositions: Volume Number One, Chapter I: Rites of Initiation (2011, Gatepost Recordings)

Compilations

- "In the Nervous Light of Sunday" (Alternate version) 10" vinyl only(2004, Monocore Records)
- "Crowquill" — Building Records Presents 60 Songs (November 2003, Building)
- "Non-Objective Portrait of Karma" — Robotic Empire Sampler No. 2 (2004, Robotic Empire)
- "The Conspiracy of Seeds" — 65daysofstatic - The Destruction of Small Ideas (April 2007, Monotreme)
