= Orchid (screamo band) =

American screamo band

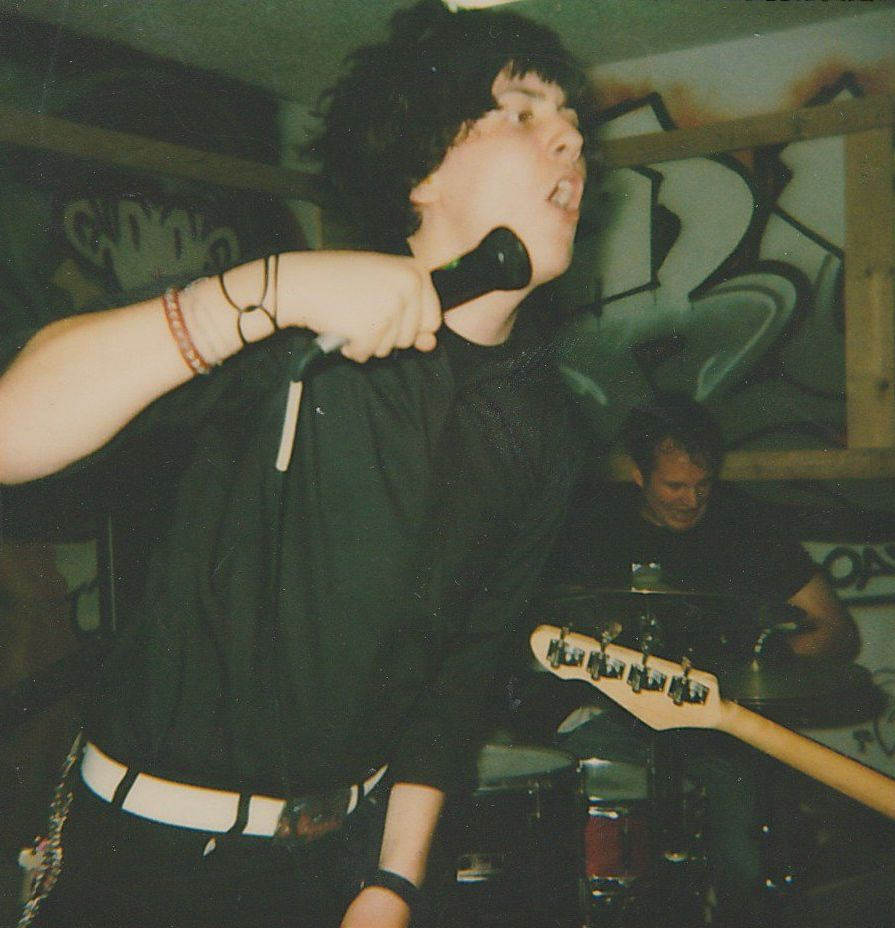
- Jayson Green (front) and Jeffrey Salane (back) performing in Bloomington, Indiana in 2000.

Background information
- Origin: Amherst, Massachusetts, U.S.
- Genres: Screamo; emoviolence
- Years active: 1997–2002; 2024–present
- Labels: Ebullition; Clean Plate
- Spinoffs: Panthers; Ampere
- Members: Jayson Green; Will Killingsworth; Jeffrey Salane; Geoff Garlock; Brad Wallace

Orchid is an American screamo band from Amherst, Massachusetts. Originally active from 1997 until 2002, they released several EPs and splits as well as three studio albums. The band consists of lead vocalist Jayson Green, drummer Jeffrey Salane, guitarist Will Killingsworth, guitarist Brad Wallace and bassist Geoff Garlock.

Orchid released three full-length albums during their initial run and played their final show on the same day as the release of their final album. The band reunited for a tour in 2024, their first shows in 22 years.

== History ==
The band was formed while Jayson Green, Will Killingsworth, and Brad Wallace were studying at Hampshire College, and Jeff Salane was attending the University of Massachusetts Amherst in early 1998.

Orchid released three albums: Chaos Is Me in 1999, Dance Tonight! Revolution Tomorrow in 2000 and Gatefold in 2002. The band played their final show of their original run on July 9, 2002, the release date of Gatefold.

In 2005, a compilation album titled Totality was released posthumously. It comprised 24 tracks, featuring out-of-press and hard-to-find B-side and split EP materials that were previously only available on vinyl.

Jayson Green later formed a hardcore punk supergroup named Violent Bullshit with members of Black Army Jacket and the Fiery Furnaces. Jayson Green, Will Killingsworth, and Geoff Garlock currently play together in the band Ritual Mess.

Green provided vocals on "Pow Pow", the lead single to LCD Soundsystem's 2010 album This Is Happening.

The band received numerous offers to reunite, the most lucrative coming from Roadburn Festival in the Netherlands, but Green did not tell his bandmates as the band had been uninterested in coming back. After an interview with Machine Music Green, Killingsworth and Wallace, the band began the process of reuniting. In December 2023, Orchid announced a reunion and tour in 2024. The band's first show in 22 years took place on May 5, 2024, at The Drake in Amherst, Massachusetts. For their reunion shows, original bassist Brad Wallace rejoined the band as an additional guitarist.

== Style ==
Orchid's musical style (which primarily has been described as screamo) is highly dissonant, fast, and chaotic. It combines the melodic and poetic approach of post-hardcore and emo with the extremity of powerviolence (a fusion sometimes termed emoviolence) and grindcore. Italian site "Emotional Breakdown" gave a positive review of Orchid's compilation album Totality, saying: "[Orchid] are the concentrated essence of the most poignant music you can imagine: the vocal cords that are pulled until they tear, the music sounds dark and desperate. They possess all these characteristics as the undisputed masters they have taught many proselytes, in all of their cynical splendor."

== Legacy ==
Orchid is regarded as a prominent and quintessential band in screamo. Lars Gotrich of NPR music credited Orchid (alongside bands Pg 99, Circle Takes the Square and Majority Rule) as being prominent influences on emotional post-hardcore. Green said, "we just called ourselves a hardcore band."

Orchid have been cited as an influence by Thursday, Thrice, Senses Fail, My Chemical Romance, Vein.fm, SeeYouSpaceCowboy, Deafheaven, Touché Amoré, and Defeater. Canadian post-hardcore band Silverstein covered "Destination: Blood" on their album Short Songs. A tribute album, Epilogue of a Car Crash!, was released in 2013 on Dog Knights Productions. Piet Onthel covered "Weekend At The Fire Academy" on their demo in 2018. Letters of Marque covered "Lights Out" on Spring Roots & Lullabies, a charity compilation for Trans Lifeline released in 2023.

== Members ==
- Jayson Green – vocals (1997–2002, 2024–present); keyboards, percussion (2002)
- Will Killingsworth – guitar (1997–2002, 2024–present); keyboards (2002)
- Jeffrey Salane – drums, percussion (1997–2002, 2024–present)
- Brad Wallace – bass (1997–1999), guitar (2024–present)
- Geoff Garlock – bass (1999–2002, 2024–present)

== Discography ==
=== Albums ===
- Chaos Is Me (Ebullition, June 21, 1999)
- Dance Tonight! Revolution Tomorrow! (Ebullition, December 4, 2000)
- Orchid (Ebullition, July 9, 2002)

=== Compilations ===
- Dance Tonight! Revolution Tomorrow! + Chaos Is Me (Ebullition, September 10, 2002)
- Totality (Clean Plate, CD January 15, 2005, Vinyl 2014)
- Skull Sessions (Self-Released, 2025)

=== Singles & EPs ===
- We Hate You Demo (Self-Released, 1997)
- Split with Pig Destroyer (Amendment, 1997)
- Orchid 7" (Hand Held Heart, 1998)
- Split with Encyclopedia Of American Traitors (Witching Hour Records, 1998)
- Split with Combat Wounded Veteran (Clean Plate, 2000)
- Split with The Red Scare (Hand Held Heart, 2000)
- Split with Jeromes Dream (Witching Hour Records, 2000)

=== Compilation appearances ===
- "Weekend at the Fire Academy" on Songs Of The Dead (1998, Ape Records)
- "September 18th, 1993" featured on Falafel Grind (1999, Obscene Productions)
- "Halving the Bones" featured on Better Luck Next Time (1999, Witching Hour Records)
