= Screamo =

Subgenre of emo music

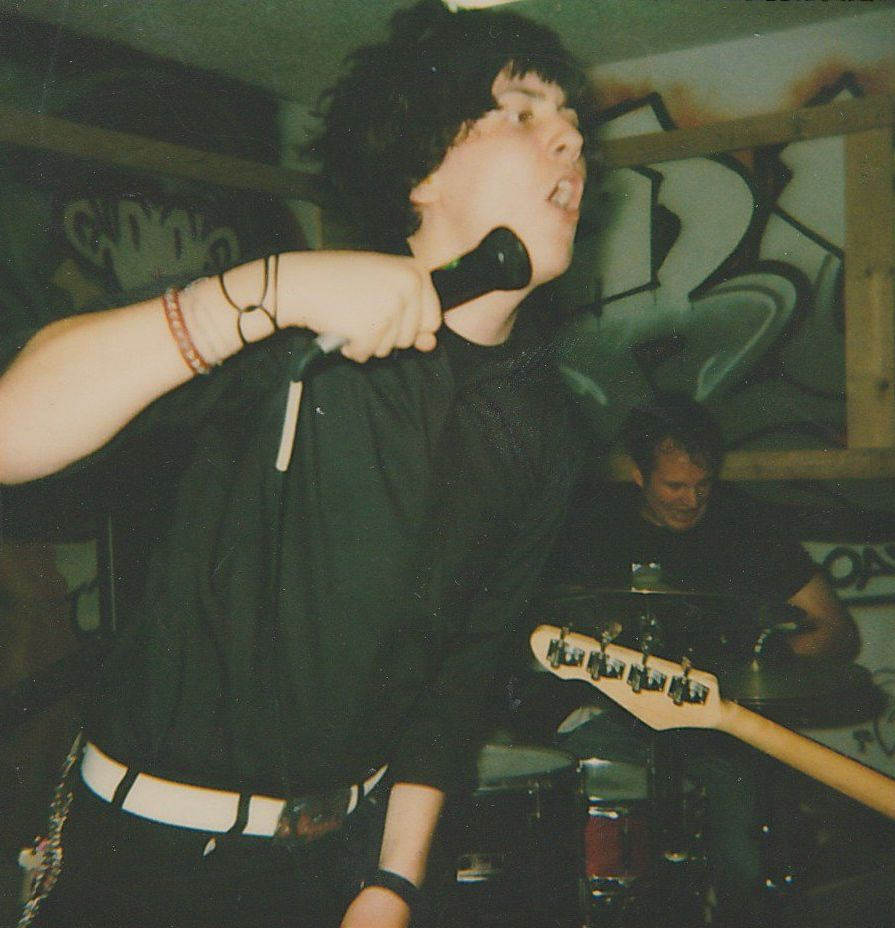
- Orchid performing in 2000
- Other names: Skramz
- Stylistic origins: Emo; hardcore punk; post-hardcore
- Cultural origins: Early 1990s, San Diego, California, U.S.
- Derivative forms: Pop screamo; sass

Subgenres
- Bedroom skramz; kittencore

Fusion genres
- Emo-crust; emoviolence; post-screamo

Regional scenes
- New Jersey; Southern Ontario; the wave; UKswell

Local scenes
- San Diego sound

Other topics
- Bands; screaming (music); metalcore; Risecore

Screamo (also referred to as skramz) is a subgenre of emo that emerged in the early 1990s and emphasizes "willfully experimental dissonance and dynamics". San Diego–based bands Heroin and Antioch Arrow pioneered the genre in the early 1990s, and it was developed in the late 1990s mainly by bands from the East Coast of the United States such as Pg. 99, Orchid, Saetia, and I Hate Myself. Screamo is strongly influenced by hardcore punk and characterized by the use of screamed vocals. Lyrical themes usually include emotional pain, death, romance, and human rights. The term "screamo" has frequently been mistaken as referring to any music with screaming.

== Characteristics ==
"Bang Yer Head" by Portraits of Past
An example of early screamo by Portraits of Past, an influential band which helped define the genre.

"Cross Out the Eyes" by Thursday
An example of screamo's influence on mainstream music, popularized by Thursday in the early 2000s.

"Fly by Night" by Loma Prieta
An example of contemporary screamo by Loma Prieta, featuring harsh vocals, stylistic transitions, and emotional lyrics.

Screamo is a style of hardcore punk-influenced emo with screaming. Alex Henderson of AllMusic considers screamo a bridge between hardcore punk and emo, and Andrew Sacher of BrooklynVegan states the genre is "built on chaos". Screamo uses typical rock instrumentation, but is notable for its brief compositions, chaotic sounds, harmonized guitars, and screaming vocals. Screamo is characterized "by frequent shifts in tempo and dynamics and by tension-and-release catharses". Many screamo bands also incorporate ballads. According to AllMusic, screamo is "generally based in the aggressive side of the overarching punk-revival scene". Screamed vocals are used "not consistently, but as a kind of crescendo element, a sonic weapon to be trotted out when the music and lyrics reach a particular emotional pitch". Emotional singing and harsh screaming are common vocals in screamo.

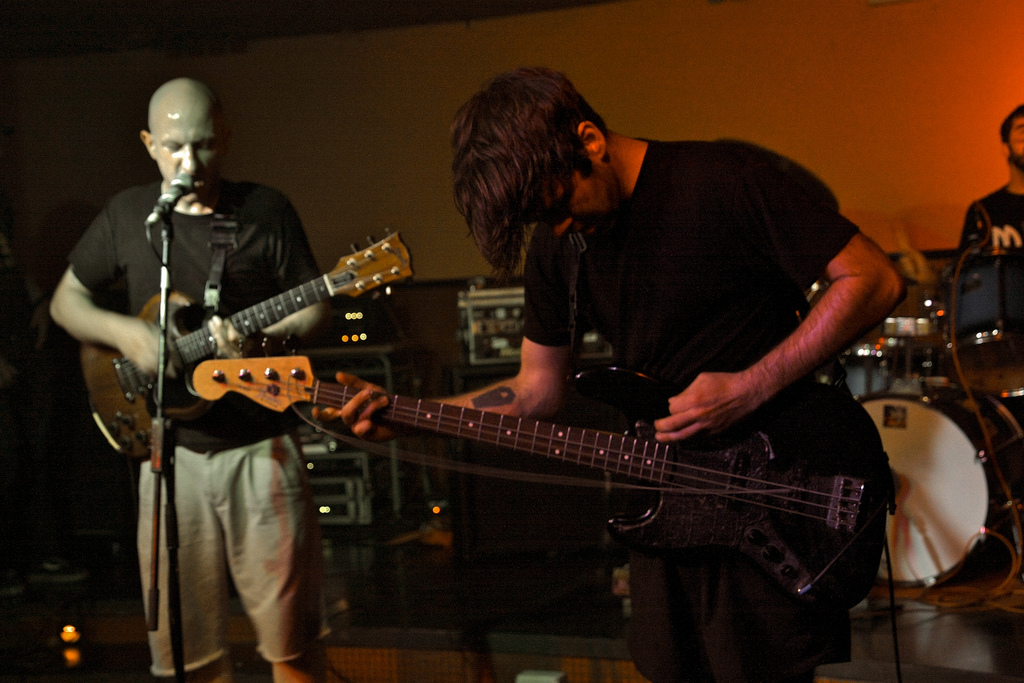
Screamo band Off Minor performing, June 2008

Screamo lyrics often feature topics such as emotional pain, breakups, romantic interest, politics, and human rights. These lyrics are usually introspective, similar to that of softer emo bands. The New York Times noted that "part of the music's appeal is its un-self-conscious acceptance of differences, respect for otherness." Some screamo bands openly demonstrate acceptance of religious, nonreligious, and straight edge lifestyles.

Many screamo bands in the 1990s saw themselves as implicitly political, and as a reaction against the turn to the right embodied by California politicians, such as Roger Hedgecock. Some groups were also unusually theoretical in inspiration: Angel Hair cited surrealist writers Antonin Artaud and Georges Bataille, and Orchid lyrically name-checked French new wave icon Anna Karina, German philosopher Friedrich Nietzsche, French philosopher Michel Foucault, and critical theory originators the Frankfurt School.

== Etymology ==
The term screamo is a portmanteau of the words "scream" and "emo". While the genre was developing in the early 1990s, it was not initially called "screamo". The term began to be used by the mid-1990s, solely amongst the DIY hardcore scene. Chris Taylor, lead vocalist for the band Pg. 99, said "we never liked that whole screamo thing. Even during our existence, we tried to venture away from the fashion and tell people, 'Hey, this is punk.'" Jonathan Dee of The New York Times wrote that the term "tends to bring a scornful laugh from the bands themselves".

=== Corruption ===
Following the late 1990s popularity of screamo-adjacent band the Locust, screamo began to attract the attention of people outside of hardcore, and its name was being used more broadly. During the early 2000s, the term became equally as tied to the original screamo sound, as to the more melodic, but screamo-influenced, pop screamo sound of Alexisonfire, Poison the Well and the Used. In 2003, Derek Miller, guitarist for Poison the Well, noted the term's constant differing usages and jokingly stated that it "describes a thousand different genres". In 2008, Bert McCracken, lead singer of the Used, stated that screamo is merely a term "for record companies to sell records and for record stores to categorize them".

By the mid-2000s, the popularity of pop screamo had led to the word "screamo" being used loosely to describe any use of screamed vocals in music. In 2007, Juan Gabe, vocalist for the screamo band Comadre, alleged that the term "has been kind of tainted in a way, especially in the States". Quinn Villarreal of SiriusXM observed, "If a song had singing AND screaming in it, your grandmother and/or school bully probably called it screamo."

=== Recodification ===
To combat the increasingly broad-nature of "screamo", the retronym "skramz" began to be used to describe the original DIY definition of screamo. This term was coined jokingly by Alex Bigman of San Diego bands Seeing Means More and Fight Fair. This codification also saw the rise of the term "pop screamo", for the more mainstream derivative, as well as its synonyms "MTV screamo" and "mall screamo". Lars Gotrich of NPR Music made the following comment on the matter in 2011:

The screamo scene [has] change[d] a lot in the last 10 years. There used to be more creative bands like Circle Takes the Square and City of Caterpillar. And then it took this route where screamo got really streamlined and unrecognizable to the point where someone hilariously invented the term skramz to distinguish the first wave of screamo bands.

== History ==
=== Origins (early 1990s) ===
Around 1990, a number of bands began pushing the sound of early emo into more extreme and chaotic territory. In particular, San Diego's Heroin is the band generally cited as either pioneering screamo or being the band that inspired the earliest acts in the genre, with other notable bands from the city, including Antioch Arrow and Swing Kids. At the time, the sound of these groups was called the "San Diego sound", a style which Radio Silence: A Selected Visual History of American Hardcore Music (2008) described as "a new sound in hardcore rooted in tradition but boasting a chaotic sound that showcased a new approach" to the genre. The most influential acts were those signed to Gravity Records, a label founded in 1991 by Matt Anderson, member of Heroin, as a means to release the music of his band and of other related San Diego groups. In a 2024 interview, Aaron Montaigne of Heroin and Antioch Arrow, credited the bands' influence largely as coming from Revolution Summer bands, in addition to the Birthday Party and that their vocal style was inspired by San Francisco emo band Fuel.

These early San Diego screamo bands were sometimes called "spock rock" by fans due to many of them dyeing their hair black and cutting straight fringes similar to the Star Trek character Spock. This, in combination with their geek-chic style of dressing would prove particularly influential on the development of the subsequent emo and scene subcultures.

Gravity Records also featured releases by non-San Diego bands including Mohinder (from Cupertino, California) and Angel Hair (from Boulder, Colorado), who were also labelled with the San Diego sound. Gravity Records bands were closely related to the scenes based on Paramus' Gern Blandsten Records and Santa Barbara County's Ebullition Records. On those labels, styles similar to the San Diego sound were produced by Downcast, Born Against, Rorschach, Econochrist, 1.6 Band and Merel. The influence of these three labels initiated a wave of bands that Zap magazine called "Gravity-core" in 1991, including Chino Horde, Policy of 3, Native Nod and Still Life. This was particularly prevalent in San Francisco Bay Area, beginning when Cory Linstrum of End of the Line moved there from San Diego in 1991. Linstrum formed John Henry West with Fuel guitarist Sarah Kirsch. Alongside Downcast from Santa Barbara and Manumission from Goleta, the band occupied a state-wide space, equally playing San Diego's Ché Café, Hollywood's Macondo, Isla Vista's the Red Barn and Berkley's 924 Gilman Street.

=== Diversification (mid–to late 1990s) ===
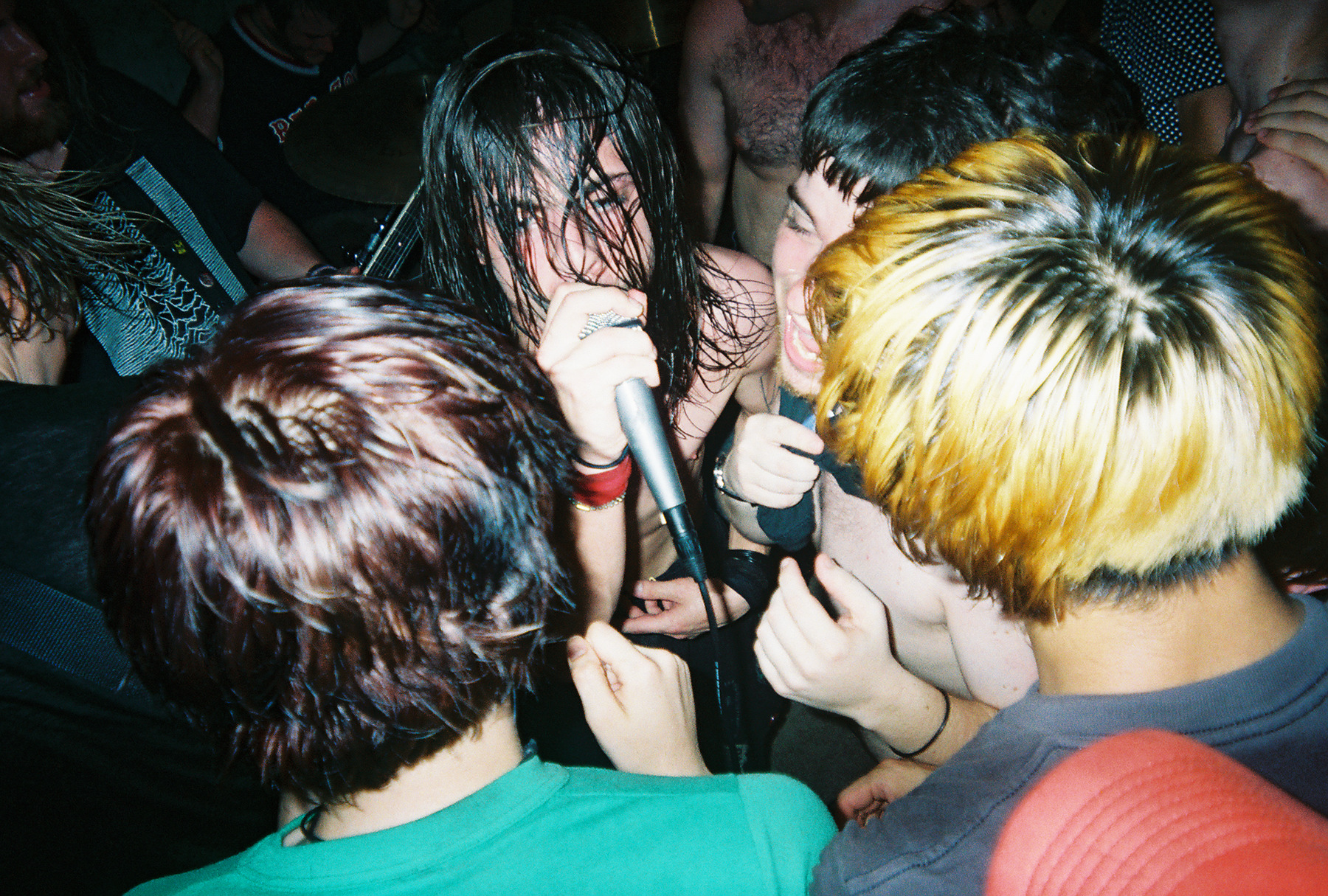
Screamo band Pg. 99 performing in Reading, Pennsylvania

Many bands in the southern United States began pushing the early screamo sound even further sonically. Columbia, South Carolina band In/Humanity coined the term "emoviolence" to describe this sound, played by them, as well as Florida bands Palatka and the End of the Century Party. When coined, the term was a tongue in cheek portmanteau of "emo" and "powerviolence", two genre descriptions the members of In/Humanity maligned.

In San Francisco, Portraits of Past were one of the earliest groups to merge the primitive screamo sound with post-rock. The band's 1993 demo and 1994 split EP with Bleed, showcased a higher pitched scream than many prior bands in the genre, which would set the standard style for vocalists to come. Their fusion with post-rock was continued by Funeral Diner, while also embracing the influence of black metal.

During the mid-1990s, many screamo bands began to embrace elements of post-punk, new wave music and gothic rock, due to the influence of Nation of Ulysses. Antioch Arrow did so on their second album Gems of Masochism (1995). Following the 1993 disbandment of San Fransico's Portraits of Past, the majority of its final lineup formed the Audience, who adopted synthesizers, Rhode Island's Six Finger Satellite adopted elements of no wave and disco music on Severe Exposure (1995) and Washington state's Satisfact adopted post-punk and new wave synthesizers. By 1998, this had developed the sass genre, pioneered by the VSS and the Blood Brothers. Vice Media writer David Anthony stated that in the late 2000s, "Detractors would often lay the scourge of white belts and so-called 'sass-core' at" the feet of Justin Pearson, vocalist for Crimson Curse and the Locust.

In Southern Ontario, Canada developed a populace and diverse hardcore scene during the mid-1990s. One element of this scene was bands who played music inspired by screamo, the most prominent of which were Grade, New Day Rising and Shotmaker, and based around the annual S.C.E.N.E. Music Festival. Grade had begun their career playing a style indebted to Chokehold. However, by the time of their debut album And Such Is Progress (1995), they had departed into a style more informed by Indian Summer, Rye Coalition and Lincoln. With this change, vocalist Kyle Bishop began contrasting his screams with sung vocals inspired by James Brown, Black Francis and Bob Mould. This fusion was widely influential. Writers, including David Marchese of Spin and Michael Barclay, have credited Grade with creating screamo. While journalist Sam Southerland credited them as the first band to "seamlessly" merge screaming and singing, also stating "They occupy the same space as Refused: they did something incredibly innovative... they either get no credit because their progeny is hideous, or they’re dismissed because serious music journalists don’t pontificate about bands Alternative Press covered."

Towards the end of the 1990s and into the 2000s, Virginia developed a large and influential screamo scene: Pg. 99, who continued in the extreme and chaotic screamo sound; City of Caterpillar, who were one of the most influential early bands to merge screamo with post-rock; Majority Rule who merged the genre with metalcore; and Malady who merged post-inflected screamo with indie rock. All of which released albums which BrooklynVegan writer Andrew Sacher called essential albums in the genre. One of the most influential bands to come from the New York City screamo scene was Saetia, who formed in 1997 and created a sound influenced by math rock, jazz and Midwest emo. Following Saetia's 1999 disbandment, its members formed the similarly influential bands Off Minor and Hot Cross. Other impactful groups in the genre at this time included Jeromes Dream, Neil Perry, I Hate Myself, Reversal of Man, Yaphet Kotto and Orchid.

=== Mainstream crossover (2000s) ===
Following the release of their 2001 album Full Collapse, New Jersey's Thursday were the first screamo-influenced band to gain significant media attention. The following year, saw the release of Canada's Alexisonfire's self-titled album, which Metal Hammer writer Matt Mills called "key in legitimising the screamo sound". In the following years, the Used, Thrice, Finch and Silverstein all gained significant attention for furthering this sound. In contrast to the do-it-yourself screamo bands of the 1990s, screamo bands such as Thursday and the Used signed multi-album contracts with labels such as Island Def Jam and Reprise Records. However, this style's connection to the genre has been disputed, with some referring to it as "MTV screamo" or "pop-screamo".

In the underground screamo scene, post-rock became an increasingly prominent influence amongst bands. The most prominent and influential of these acts was Richmond, Virginia's City of Caterpillar, who Vice writer Jason Heller stated "encompass [the] era". Music critics coined the term "post-screamo" to refer to this sound. Other prominent acts making this sound at the time included Circle Takes the Square, Raein, Envy and Daïtro. Fluff Fest, held in Czechia since 2000, was in 2017 described by Bandcamp Daily as a "summer ritual" for many fans of screamo in Europe.

In Spain, bands such as Hongo, Das Plague, Ekkaia, Madame Germen and Blünt merged crust punk with elements of screamo, such as melodic minor key guitar leads, slow segues and acoustic passages. At the time, this fusion was called "emo crust". By 2002, Ekkaia and had toured with the American crust punk band Tragedy, and subsequently adopted elements of each other's styles creating the neo-crust genre.

=== Underground reclamation (2010s–2020s) ===
In the early 2010s the term "screamo" began to be largely reclaimed by a new crop of do-it-yourself bands, with many screamo acts, like Loma Prieta, Pianos Become the Teeth, La Dispute, and Touché Amoré releasing records on fairly large independent labels such as Deathwish Inc. In 2011 Alternative Press noted that La Dispute is "at the forefront of a traditional-screamo revival" for their critically acclaimed release Wildlife. They are a part of a group of stylistically similar screamo-revival bands self-defined as the wave, made up of Touché Amoré, La Dispute, Defeater, Pianos Become the Teeth, and Make Do and Mend. As well as, California's Deafheaven, who formed in 2010, having been described as screamo, in a style similar to that of Envy.

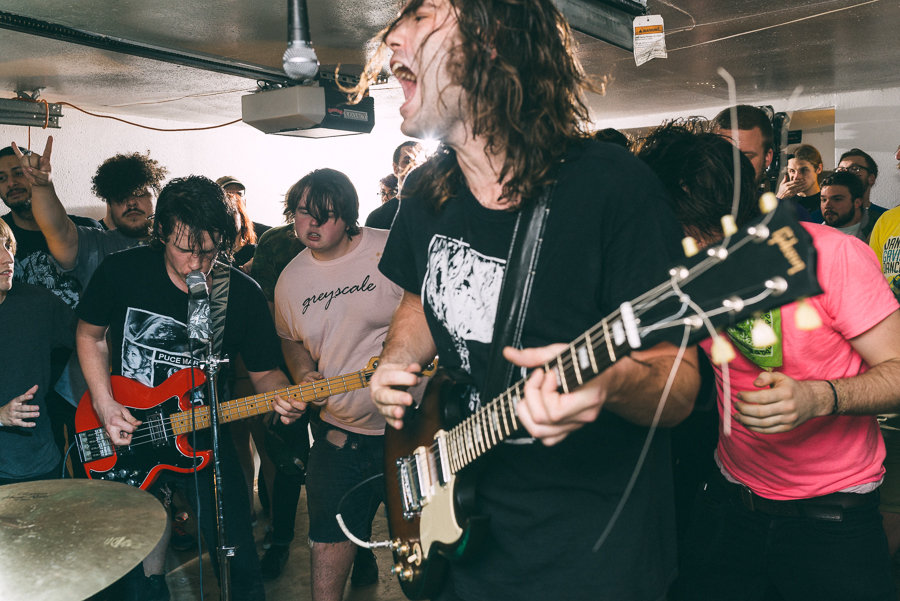
Screamo band Ostraca performing live in 2015

In August 2018, Noisey writer Dan Ozzi declared that it was the "Summer of Screamo" in a month-long series documenting screamo acts pushing the genre forward following the decline in popularity of the wave, as well as the reunions of seminal bands such as Pg. 99, Majority Rule, City of Caterpillar, and Jeromes Dream. Groups highlighted in this coverage, including Respire, Ostraca, Portrayal of Guilt, Soul Glo, I Hate Sex, and Infant Island, had generally received positive press from large publications, but were not as widely successful as their predecessors. Noisey also documented that, despite its loss of mainstream popularity and continued hold in North American scenes, particularly Richmond, Virginia, screamo had become a more international movement; notably spreading to Japan, France, and Sweden with groups including Heaven in Her Arms, Birds in Row and Suis La Lune, respectively. Also in 2018, Vein released their debut album Errorzone to critical acclaim and commercial success, bringing together elements of screamo, hardcore, and nu metal. This underground cohort of acts was primarily released by independent labels like Middle-Man Records in the United States, Zegema Beach Records in Canada, and Miss The Stars Records in Berlin.

Screamo experienced a major resurgence in the 2020s, largely practiced by generation Z. During this period, it encompassed a wide variety of styles such as traditional screamo, emoviolence and white belt grind. Amongst the most prominent groups were Vs Self, Your Arms Are My Cocoon and Widowdusk. BrooklynVegan editor Andrew Sacher said this movement is often called "TikTok screamo", noting Vs Self as one of its "best and fastest-rising bands", alongside Catalyst, Knumears and Party Hats. This name was due to Vs Self experiencing viral success on TikTok, bringing greater attention to the genre. Febuary were also a forefront act and amongst its most commercially successful. Stereogum writer Danielle Chelosky credited their 2025 EP Run Like A Girl with establishing summer 2025 as "Screamo summer".

During the early 2020s, Your Arms Are My Cocoon pioneered the bedroom skramz genre, a style that merges screamo and bedroom pop. By February 2022, the style had been adopted by Rookie Card, That Same Street, the Civil War In France, Calendar Year and Garden Angel. Another prominent sound amongst this wave was the merger of screamo with metalcore, practiced by Ted Williams, Holder, Kicked in the Head By a Horse, bulletsbetweentongues and Told Not to Worry. In a November 14, 2025 article, journalist Eli Enis labelled this style "screamo-core". In the United States, many of these bands were signed to Ephyra Records, a label key to the melodic metalcore revival and run by the metalcore band Belmora. These bands generally made use of lo-fi production. Flowersforpersephone were a particularly prominent screamo-core group, notably helping to revive the scene subculture by using aesthetic influences such as racoon tailed hair and bracelets reading "I Love Boobies".

== Subgenres and fusion genres ==
=== Emoviolence ===
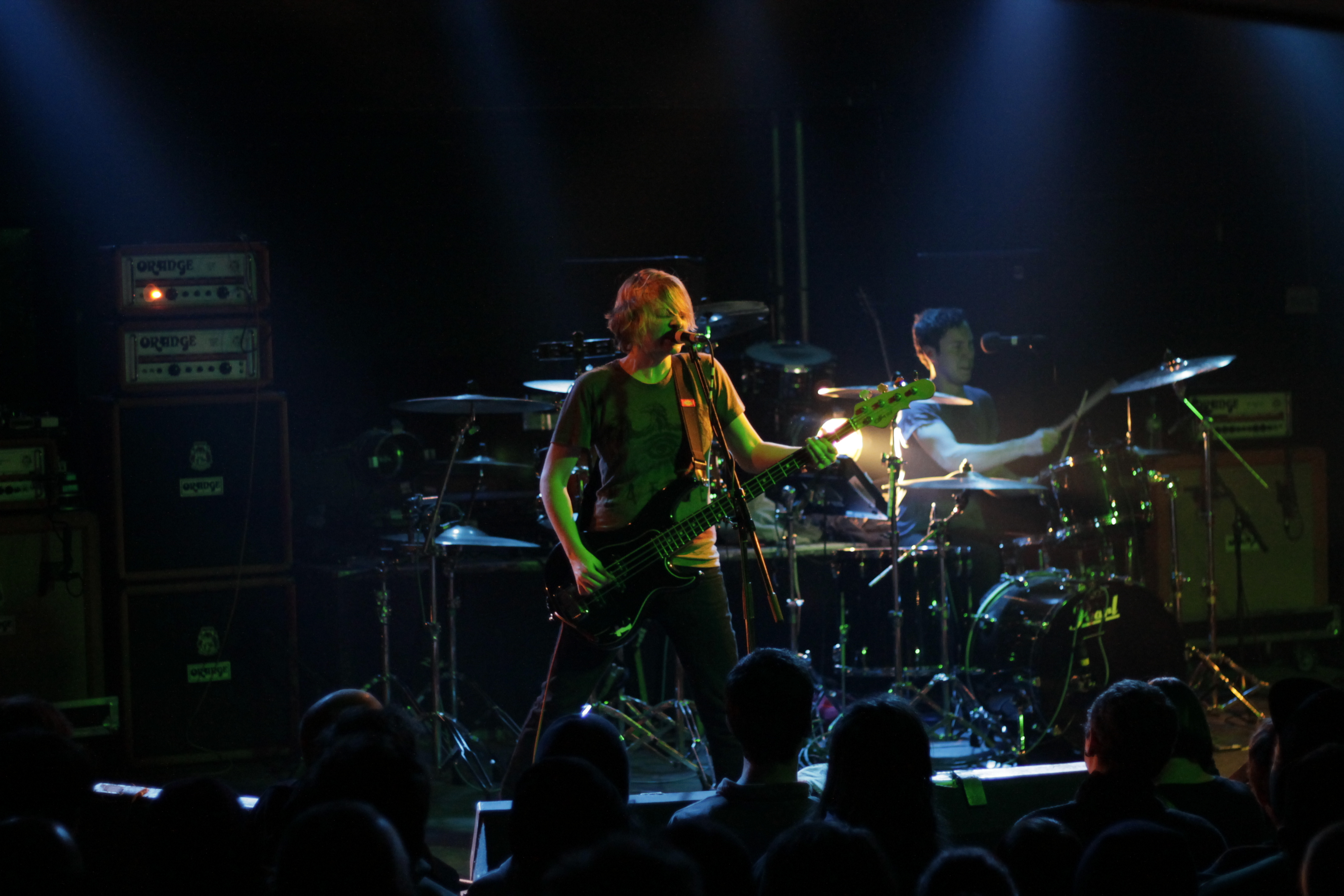
Circle Takes the Square, whose style borders on grindcore and post-rock, gained considerable acclaim with the 2004 album As the Roots Undo.

Some screamo bands borrow the extreme dissonance, speed, and chaos of powerviolence. As a result, the term emoviolence was half-jokingly coined by the band In/Humanity to describe the fusion of the two styles which applied to themselves, as well as other bands including Pg. 99, Orchid, Reversal of Man, Usurp Synapse, and RentAmerica. Additionally, bands such as Orchid, Reversal of Man, and Circle Takes the Square tend to be much closer in style to grindcore than their forebears. In contemporary times, the genre is no longer as prevalent or widespread as it had been in the past, yet it still remains as a notable and prevalent force in underground screamo. A revival of the genre has occurred internationally with regional scenes in Southeast Asia and South America taking prominence.

=== Post-screamo ===
Bands including City of Caterpillar, Circle Takes the Square, Envy, Funeral Diner, Pianos Become the Teeth, Respire, and Le Pré Où Je Suis Mort have incorporated post-rock elements into their music. This fusion is characterized by abrupt changes in pace, atmospheric and harmonic instrumentation, and distorted vocals.

=== Sass ===
Sass (/sæs/) is a broadly-defined genre derived from the early San Diego screamo scene, characterized by overtly flamboyant mannerisms, homoerotic lyrical content, synthesizers, dance beats and a lisping vocal style. The genre originated as reaction against the hypermasculinity of tough guy hardcore, and according to a 2014 Stuff You Will Hate article, was less of a unified sound, and more of a performance and esthetic style that incorporated certain musical elements to support its live performances. Sass solidified itself as a genre around 1998, as music began to be released by pioneers the Blood Brothers, who influenced the Plot to Blow Up the Eiffel Tower and These Arms Are Snakes to continue the sound. The centre of the scene was the record label Sound Virus. It began to decline in popularity around 2003, and had disappeared entirely by 2005. During the early 2010s, there was a revived interest in sass amongst fans active on the screamo message board Cross My Heart With a Knife (CMHAWK). Around 2020, a sass revival had formed, featuring Circuit Circuit and SeeYouSpaceCowboy.

=== Pop screamo ===
Pop screamo is a genre derived from screamo that incorporates melodic, sung choruses and metal influenced riffs. It additionally embraces elements of emo pop, and the dissonant metalcore style of Deadguy, Botch, Converge and Coalesce. Notable bands included Poison the Well, Thursday, Alexisonfire, the Used, Funeral for a Friend, Silverstein, He Is Legend, Saosin, Underoath and Hawthorne Heights.

=== Kittencore ===
Kittencore is a style of screamo and emoviolence that emphasizes high-pitched screams, commonly performed by unexperienced teenagers. The term was coined up in screamo online forums during the early 2000s, getting its name from its characteristic vocals that resembled meows of a young kitten, and gained widespread recognition after hardcore music blog You Don't Need Maps published an article on the genre. Portraits of Past's 1993 Demo as well as their split EP with Pennsylvania band Bleed were two important releases that laid the foundations for kittencore, but it was during the 2000s when the genre reached its peak. Notable bands include In Loving Memory, Spirit of Versailles, ...Of Death, Flowers Taped to Pens, Love Lost But Not Forgotten, Tears of Avarel and Nayru.

=== Bedroom skramz ===
Bedroom skramz (or bedroom screamo) is a style that merges screamo and bedroom pop. It was pioneered by Your Arms Are My Cocoon on their 2020 self-titled debut EP. The release was widely influential, particularly amongst uploads by artists on Bandcamp. Boolin Tunes called Your Arms Are My Cocoon "a cornerstone of [emo's] fifth wave". The project also incorporated elements of chiptune. Often times, subsequent bedroom skramz projects incorporated Midwest emo's riffing style and screamed vocals with major key synthesiser melodies and calm drum samples. By February 2022, the style had been adopted by Rookie Card, That Same Street, the Civil War In France, Calendar Year and Garden Angel. Amongst these articles, experimentation with other genres continued, with Garden Angel taking from Nintendocore, house music and country music and That Same Street making use of vocaloid vocals. On their 2025 album Apiary, Gingerbee took bedroom skramz in a more progressive direction.

== See also ==
- List of screamo bands
- Post-hardcore
- Risecore
