= House of Lull. House of When =

Studio album by Alexis Marshall
- Released: July 23, 2021
- Length: 42:22
- Label: Sargent House
- Producer: Seth Manchester

Singles from House of Lull. House of When
- 1. "Hounds in the Abyss" Released: June 3, 2021; 2. "Open Mouth" Released: June 30, 2021

House of Lull. House of When ratings
Review scores
Source	Rating
Beats Per Minute	86%
Flood Magazine	6/10
Kerrang!	3/5
Loud and Quiet	8/10
The Needle Drop	7/10
Pitchfork	7.2/10
Sputnikmusic	3.9/5

House of Lull. House of When is the solo debut album of Daughters frontman Alexis Marshall. The album was released on July 23, 2021, by Sargent House.

== Release ==
Marshall announced the album on June 3, 2021, and released the lead single, "Hounds in the Abyss", the same day. "Hounds in the Abyss" came with a music video directed by Jeremy W. which sees Marshall in an all-white room which eventually fills with people. The second single, "Open Mouth", was released on June 30, and came with a music video directed by John Bradburn and starring Charlie Greenwood.

== Recording ==
Marshall recorded the album with producer Seth Manchester in Providence, Rhode Island.

== Track listing ==
All tracks are written by Alexis Stephen Marshall with others noted.

House of Lull. House of When track listing
No.	Title	Writer(s)	Length
1.	"Drink from the Oceans. Nothing Can Harm You"	Evan Patterson; Jonathan Syverson; Kristin Michelle Hayter	7:01
2.	"Hounds in the Abyss"	Patterson; Syverson; Hayter	6:02
3.	"It Just Doesn't Feel Good Anymore"	Syverson	4:04
4.	"Youth as Religion."	Hayter	5:21
5.	"Religion as Leader"	Syverson; Hayter	4:04
6.	"No Truth in the Body"	Hayter	4:42
7.	"Open Mouth"	Patterson; Syverson; Hayter	3:45
8.	"They Can Lie There Forever"		3:07
9.	"Night Coming"	Patterson; Hayter	4:16
Total length:			42:22

== Personnel ==
=== Musicians ===
- Alexis Marshall – vocals, noise, percussion, dulcimer, photography
- Kristin Hayter – vocals, piano, synthesizer, noise, cover photo
- Evan Patterson – guitar
- Jon Syverson – drums

=== Technical ===
- Seth Manchester – producer, engineer
- Ben Chisholm – layout
- Kristin Hayter – cover photograph
- Alexis Marshall – additional photography

== See also ==
- House of Lull. House of When at Discogs (list of releases)
