= Dance on the Blacktop =

Studio album by Nothing
- Released: August 24, 2018
- Recorded: October 2017 – April 2018
- Studio: Dreamland Studio; Woodstock, New York
- Genre: Shoegaze; alternative rock
- Length: 43:25
- Label: Relapse
- Producer: John Agnello

Nothing chronology
Tired of Tomorrow (2016)	Dance on the Blacktop (2018)	The Great Dismal (2020)

Singles from Dance on the Blacktop
- 1. "Zero Day" Released: June 5, 2018; 2. "Blue Line Baby" Released: July 11, 2018; 3. "The Carpenter's Son" Released: August 9, 2018; 4. "You Wind Me Up" Released: October 30, 2018

Dance on the Blacktop is the third studio album by American shoegaze band Nothing. It is the last album to feature bassist Nick Bassett (also the guitarist of Whirr) and longtime guitarist-vocalist Brandon Setta before both departed the band between 2018 and 2019, respectively. The album was released on August 24, 2018 by Relapse Records.

== Background ==
In October 2017, it was announced that Nothing had begun recording a third studio album at Dreamland Studio in Woodstock, New York with producer John Agnello. The band took a break from recording the album in December 2017 for a mini tour with Ceremony.

On June 5, 2018, the first single from the album, "Zero Day", was released. A preview of the song debuted in Revolver magazine on May 30, 2018. The same day as the single's release, Nothing announced the track listing, album release date and their fall 2018 tour, which involved supporting acts Swirlies, Big Bite and Smut.

The second single, "Blue Line Baby", was released on July 11, 2018, accompanied with a music video a week later. Revolver described the track and the music video as "gorgeously surreal" and "ethereal".

On August 9, 2018, "The Carpenter's Son", the third and final single prior to the release of the album, was released. Chris DeVille of Stereogum praised the track, saying the song "is Nothing at their most serene. Over the course of eight minutes, it undergoes a bit of dynamic fluctuation, but mostly it's a gorgeous slow-drift that demonstrates how powerful Nothing can be without ever roaring the way they often do".

== Critical reception ==
Professional ratings
Aggregate scores
Source	Rating
AnyDecentMusic?	7.2/10
Metacritic	77/100
Review scores
Source	Rating
AllMusic	3.5/5 stars
The A.V. Club	B+
Drowned in Sound	6/10
Exclaim!	8/10
Kerrang!	4/5 stars
NME	4/5 stars
Pitchfork	7.1/10
The Skinny	3/5 stars

Dance on the Blacktop received critical acclaim upon its release. At Metacritic, which assigns a normalized rating out of 100 to reviews from mainstream publications, the album received an average score of 77, based on 13 reviews, indicating "generally favourable reviews".

== Track listing ==
All music is composed by Domenic Palermo and Brandon Setta.

No.	Title	Length
1.	"Zero Day"	3:57
2.	"Blue Line Baby"	4:30
3.	"You Wind Me Up"	3:59
4.	"Plastic Migraine"	4:43
5.	"Us/We/Are"	3:34
6.	"Hail on Palace Pier"	4:48
7.	"I Hate the Flowers"	4:21
8.	"The Carpenter's Son"	7:45
9.	"(Hope) Is Just Another Word With a Hole in It"	5:48
Total length:		43:25

== Personnel ==
Dance on the Blacktop album personnel adapted from album credits.

Nothing

- Domenic Palermo – vocals, guitar, record producer, art direction
- Brandon Setta – vocals, guitar
- Kyle Kimball – percussion
- Nick Bassett – bass, keyboards

Additional personnel

- John Agnello – engineering, mixing, production
- Domenick Antieatro – assistant
- Greg Calbi – mastering
- Garrett "Kevin" Deblock – assistant
- Demon Drums – drum technician
- Steve Fallone – assistant
- Carlos Hernandez – overdubs
- Alex Lipsen – overdubs
- Ryan Lowry – photography
- Mark McCoy – art direction
- Emily Rittenhouse – assistant
- Jacob Speis – layout
