= Daughters (album) =

Studio album by Daughters
- Released: March 9, 2010
- Recorded: April 2009 at Machines With Magnets in Pawtucket, RI
- Genre: Noise rock
- Length: 27:55
- Label: Hydra Head (HH666-195)
- Producers: Keith Souza; Nicholas Sadler

Daughters chronology
Hell Songs (2006)	Daughters (2010)	You Won't Get What You Want (2018)

Singles from Daughters
- 1. "The First Supper" Released: 2010

Daughters is the third studio album by American rock band Daughters, released on March 9, 2010, through Hydra Head Records. It was released after the band's initial break up in August 2009, and would be their final studio release until, following the band's reformation in 2013, it was followed by You Won't Get What You Want in 2018.

== Background ==
=== Writing and recording ===
Sadler described the writing process of their third album as, "[making] demos for three years at the house and then taking songs, song ideas and some riffs to the practice space to hash them out with Jon [Syverson]. This album really caught up with us. People were getting a little older, the whole band was extremely poor from touring over the years, so life outside the band really caught up with us and it became hard to really do anything. I'm very proud of this record just because we were able to make it, you know? It was a real struggle."

Recording for Daughters' third album began in late April, 2009, and tracking was finished by June. However, in August, Daughters had abruptly broken up. After finishing recording for the album Sadler stated he and Marshall got in an argument, resulting in Marshall leaving the band. The rest of the band then went on hiatus. Sadler continued with mastering the record, finalizing the artwork and worked with artist Dave Fisher on a trailer video. Sadler stated that he "was essentially trying to keep the band alive for who-knows-what" and "hoping [Marshall] would come back or maybe in a few years we would start playing again." Eventually Sadler moved to Brooklyn and Marshall expressed interest in rejoining, but insisted that Sadler should be replaced, which consequently resulted in the band's dissolution.

=== Self-critique comments ===
Members of the band have mixed feelings about the album. In an interview with Noisecreep Marshall said, "there are definitely parts of the record that were written to see how people will respond, which is kind of disappointing. I think there’s some really good shit on there that I’m excited about. But it was definitely like a ‘Let’s put in a lot of recording time’…There was overthinking involved. We recorded it in May or June, that’s so much time to sit and look at it. Maybe I’m over-analyzing it." In an interview with Buddyhead Sadler stated, "I have mixed feelings about it. It's sad that the band fell apart as this record was being released because I do believe it was a sort of coming of age recording, but that it was only a peek at what was to come. Writing this album felt like a dusting of cobwebs for me and as though we were stepping into a territory that was fresh and exciting for our band; at least that was my goal when i made it. On the other hand, it's great to be away from the stresses of the band. Daughters was a band that provided me with some really great memories and took me around the world, helped me make some great friends and allowed me to do what I’ve always wanted to do with my life. I feel extremely grateful to have been able to work together with dudes that I’ve known for a long time in a band I felt had integrity. I am truly blessed to have had the opportunity to write and record our last record as I am extremely proud of it, especially in the context and history of the band."

== Musical style ==
Daughters is considered by critics to be the band's most accessible album to date. Previous albums, 2003's Canada Songs and 2006's Hell Songs, featured a comparatively more intense grindcore sound. Vocalist Alexis Marshall also sings instead of screams on the album similar to the band's previous album Hell Songs.

Guitarist Nick Sadler experimented with more commercially accessible guitar parts when making the album. Sadler had grown tired of performing the "dizzying [and] high-pitched" songs from Hell Songs live, and wanted to add "more groove and low-end" to the band's sound. He wrote bigger-sounding songs that wouldn't "get lost in a large room", contrasting with previous Daughters albums. Marshall was not pleased with the band's new sound on Daughters, citing that it was forced, not natural, and therefore not artistic at all. In an interview with Noisecreep, Marshall commented, "It's so easy to steer it and try to be accepted, and do this because this is what's good, and this is what's going to make our band popular. That's no good. That's not art. That's shit. It's not even shit. It's less than shit. What's less than shit? I don't even know. Trying to be other bands... that's less than shit."

== Reception ==
Professional ratings
Review scores
Source	Rating
AbsolutePunk	84%
AllMusic	3.5/5 stars
Alternative Press	4/5 stars
The Aquarian Weekly	B−
Decibel	8/10
Metal Injection	8/10
Pitchfork	8.2/10
Sputnikmusic	4/5
Under The Radar	7/10

Daughters was met with widespread critical acclaim, with many reviewers commenting on the album's cohesiveness and accessibility in comparison to their earlier work.

Writing for Pitchfork, David Raposa wrote, "...hardcore Daughters lovers will probably have plenty of bones to pick with this album. For everyone else, Daughters is a feast to be savored." Similarly Andrew Magnotta of The Aquarian Weekly said, "Daughters is a straight-ahead, tooth-grinding sprint to no place in particular. You get the sense that the band doesn’t care where they wind up as long as everything along the way is completely devastated."

== Track listing ==
All songs written and recorded by Daughters.

No.	Title	Length
1.	"The Virgin"	2:03
2.	"The First Supper"	3:19
3.	"The Hit"	3:44
4.	"The Theatre Goer"	3:40
5.	"Our Queens (One Is Many, Many Are One)"	3:11
6.	"The Dead Singer"	4:28
7.	"Sweet Georgia Brown"	3:14
8.	"The Unattractive, Portable Head"	4:16
Total length:		27:55

== Personnel ==
Daughters personnel according to CD liner notes.

Daughters

- Alexis Marshall – vocals
- Nicholas Andrew Sadler – guitars
- Samuel M. Walker – bass guitar
- Jon Syverson – drums

Additional musicians

- Brian Mullen – guest vocals
- Mike Knives – guest vocals
- Alexander Barton – guest vocals

Production and recording

- Keith Souza – production
- Nicholas Andrew Sadler – production
- Seth Manchester – assistant engineer
- Jeff Lipton – mastering
- Maria Rice – assistant mastering engineer

Artwork and design

- Rebecca Adams (Stash Vamps) – album artwork
- James O'Mara – album layout and construction
