= Tired of Tomorrow =

Studio album by Nothing
- Released: May 13, 2016
- Studios: Studio 4 Recording, Philadelphia, Pennsylvania
- Genres: Shoegaze; dream pop
- Length: 45:43
- Label: Relapse
- Producers: Jeff Zeigler; Dominic Palermo; Brandon Setta; Will Yip

Nothing chronology
Whirr / Nothing (2014)	Tired of Tomorrow (2016)	Dance on the Blacktop (2018)

Singles from Tired of Tomorrow
- 1. "Vertigo Flowers" Released: February 23, 2016; 2. "Eaten by Worms" Released: March 29, 2016; 3. "A.C.D. (Abcessive Compulsive Disorder)" Released: May 25, 2016

Tired of Tomorrow is the second studio album by American shoegaze band Nothing. It was released on May 13, 2016, by Relapse Records. It is the first Nothing album to feature bassist Nick Bassett, the guitarist of Whirr, and former guitarist of Deafheaven.

== Critical reception ==
Professional ratings
Aggregate scores
Source	Rating
AnyDecentMusic?	7.3/10
Metacritic	73/100
Review scores
Source	Rating
AllMusic	3/5 stars
Consequence of Sound	C
Drowned in Sound	9/10
Exclaim!	8/10
MusicOMH	4/5 stars
NME	4/5
Pitchfork	8.0/10
PopMatters	7/10
Rock Sound	7/10
Tiny Mix Tapes	3/5

Brandon Stosuy of Pitchfork praised the album's "invitingly deep sound", describing it as "familiar but new; varied but consistent; full of ambience but sturdy".

Tired of Tomorrow placed at number 40 on Rough Trade's Albums of the Year list for 2016. Pitchfork ranked it at number 48 on its list of "The 50 Best Shoegaze Albums of All Time".

== Track listing ==
All tracks are written by Domenic Palermo and Brandon Setta, except where noted.

No.	Title	Writer(s)	Length
1.	"Fever Queen"		2:57
2.	"The Dead Are Dumb"		4:30
3.	"Vertigo Flowers"		3:25
4.	"A.C.D. (Abcessive Compulsive Disorder)"		3:39
5.	"Nineteen Ninety Heaven"		4:41
6.	"Curse of the Sun"	Palermo; Kyle Kimball	4:48
7.	"Eaten by Worms"		5:01
8.	"Everyone Is Happy"	Palermo; Nick Bassett	4:55
9.	"Our Plague"		5:30
10.	"Tired of Tomorrow"		6:23
Total length:			45:43

== Personnel ==
Tired of Tomorrow album personnel adapted from LP liner notes.

Nothing

- Domenic Palermo – vocals, guitar, string arrangements, production, design
- Brandon Setta – vocals, guitar, production
- Nick Bassett – bass, piano
- Kyle Kimball – drums

Additional musicians

- Shelly Weiss – cello, violin, string arrangements
- Kylie Lotz – vocals

Technical

- Will Yip – producer, mixing, engineering at Studio 4 Recordings
- Ryan Smith – mastering
- Jaime Wong – assistant engineer
- Daniel Feiphery – design, photography

== Charts ==
Chart (2016)	Peak position
Belgian Albums (Ultratop Flanders)	176
UK Independent Albums (Official Charts)	48
US Billboard 200	128
US Independent Albums (Billboard)	8
US Top Rock Albums (Billboard)	15
