= The Great Dismal =

Studio album by Nothing
- Released: October 30, 2020
- Recorded: Studio 4 Recording; Conshohocken, Pennsylvania
- Genre: Shoegaze; alternative rock
- Length: 46:10
- Label: Relapse
- Producer: Will Yip; Domenic Palermo

Nothing chronology
| Dance on the Blacktop (2018) | The Great Dismal (2020) | When No Birds Sang (2023) |

Singles from The Great Dismal
- 1. "Say Less" Released: September 11, 2020; 2. "Bernie Sanders" Released: September 29, 2020; 3. "Famine Asylum" Released: October 27, 2020; 4. "April Ha Ha" Released: November 2, 2020; 5. "Catch a Fade" Released: December 3, 2020

Professional ratings
Aggregate scores
| Source | Rating |
|---|---|
| Metacritic | 76/100 |
Review scores
| Source | Rating |
| AllMusic | 4/5 stars |
| Beats Per Minute | 79% |
| Clash | 8/10 |
| DIY | 4/5 stars |
| Exclaim! | 9/10 |
| Kerrang! | 3/5 stars |
| Louder | 4/5 stars |
| NME | 3/5 stars |
| PopMatters | 8/10 |
| Scene Point Blank | 7.5/10 |
| The Line of Best Fit | 7.5/10 |
| Pitchfork | 7.0/10 |
| Under the Radar | 8.5/10 |
| New Noise | 4.5/5 stars |

The Great Dismal is the fourth studio album by American shoegaze band Nothing. It is the only album to feature bassist Aaron Heard (also a member of Jesus Piece), the first to feature Doyle Martin (also a member of Cloakroom) on guitar and backing vocals, and the last with longtime drummer Kyle Kimball. The album was released on October 30, 2020, by Relapse Records.

== Track listing ==
All tracks are written by Domenic Palermo, except where noted.

| No. | Title | Writer(s) | Length |
|---|---|---|---|
| 1. | "A Fabricated Life" | | 5:46 |
| 2. | "Say Less" | Palermo, Bassett | 4:15 |
| 3. | "April Ha Ha" | Palermo, Alex G | 4:20 |
| 4. | "Catch a Fade" | | 3:50 |
| 5. | "Famine Asylum" | | 4:10 |
| 6. | "Bernie Sanders" | | 4:07 |
| 7. | "In Blueberry Memories" | | 5:18 |
| 8. | "Blue Mecca" | | 5:17 |
| 9. | "Just a Story" | Palermo, Bassett, Kimball | 4:16 |
| 10. | "Ask the Rust" | Palermo, Kimball | 4:48 |
| Total length: | | | 46:10 |

== Personnel ==
Nothing

- Domenic Palermo – vocals, guitar, record producer
- Kyle Kimball – percussion
- Aaron Heard – bass
- Doyle Martin – guitar, backup vocals

Additional personnel

- Nick Bassett - composer
- Alex G - backing vocals (track 3)
- Will Yip - engineer, mastering, mixing, percussion, producer
- Hank Byerly - assistant engineer
- Jackson D. Green - design
- Jordan Hemingway - direction, photography
- Mary Lattimore - harp
- Walter Pearce - art direction
- Shelley Weiss - cello, viola, violin
