= Canada Songs =

Studio album by Daughters
- Released: August 12, 2003
- Recorded: 2003 at Machines With Magnets in Pawtucket, RI
- Genres: Mathcore; grindcore
- Length: 11:08
- Label: Robotic Empire

Daughters chronology
Daughters (2002)	Canada Songs (2003)	Hell Songs (2006)

Canada Songs is the debut studio album by American rock band Daughters, released on August 12, 2003 through Robotic Empire.

== Re-release ==
In 2016 Robotic Empire reissued a limited-edition version of Canada Songs on cassette. The track list also included the four tracks from Daughters' debut EP, Daughters as bonus tracks.

== Reception ==
Professional ratings
Review scores
Source	Rating
Drowned in Sound	9/10
Kerrang!	4/5 stars
Lambgoat	7/10
Punknews.org	4/5 stars
Spin	B+
Terrorizer	8.5/10

Mat Hocking May of Drowned in Sound stated the album is "It’s nothing short of intense" and "a rabid cut ‘n’ slash firebomb of splintered art-core and lacerating guitar shrieks". May also praises Daughters' approach to the album saying "Daughters’ chaotically freeform approach reconfigures the way melody and noise is assimilated through some of the most fiercely challenging experimentation probably ever attempted."

Kerrang called the band a "A seditious delight" and stated "When you play chaotic art-core at blistering speed, there's a fine line between being inventive and exhilarating and being vapid and pointless. Thankfully, Daughters fall firmly into the former camp".

Dan Perrone of Punknews compared the album to grindcore in general and later said '[they are] not like most grind music". Perrone also praised the guitar playing "The guitars on Canada Songs are what makes this band worth listening to". Perrone finished his review saying "It's truly mind-blowing music, but like most grind, it loses it's [sic] value rather quickly after a few listens."

Spin magazine praised drummer Jon Syverson's fast way of playing, "Slap-happy metallic grind punk with a drummer who grooves like Roy Jones Jr. working over a kitchen full of pots and pans in 14/8 time. There are even oddly melodic moments, despite guitars that sound like busted car alarms, and at 11 minutes total, there's no wasted motion".

Cory of Lambgoat talked about the album's variety stating "There isn't an amazing variety from track to track". He also mentioned his dislike of the way the album was presented stating "My major problem with this disc (besides it's [sic] length) is the sort of pretension and pomposity with which it is presented. The Daughters' press release reads like the work of a grad student trying to impress his peers with big words and obscure philosophical references". Despite the seemly negative review he scored the album a 7/10 and described the album as "an excellent ten minutes of spastic grind and discordant chaos".

== Track listing ==
No.	Title	Length
1.	"Fur Beach"	0:38
2.	"Jones from Indiana"	1:05
3.	"I Slept with the Daughters and All I Got Was This Lousy Song Written About Me"	1:11
4.	"And Then the C.H.U.D.S. Came"	1:24
5.	"Mike Morowitz, The Fantasy Fuck"	0:34
6.	"Nurse, Would You Please Prep the Patient for Sexual Doctor"	1:19
7.	"I Don't Give a Shit About Wood, I'm Not a Chemist"	1:18
8.	"Pants, Meet Shit"	0:52
9.	"Damn Those Blood Suckers and Their Good Qualities"	0:54
10.	"The Ghost with the Most"	1:53
Total length:		11:08

== Personnel ==
Daughters

- Alexis Marshall – vocals
- Pat Masterson – bass
- Perri Peete – guitar
- Jon Syverson – drums
- Jeremy Wabiszczewicz – guitar

Production and recording

- Keith Souza – production
- Alan Douches – mastering

Artwork and design

- Jeremy Wabiszczewicz – album artwork and layout
