= You Won't Get What You Want =

Studio album by Daughters
- Released: October 26, 2018
- Recorded: 2018
- Studio: Machines with Magnets in Pawtucket, Rhode Island
- Genre: Noise rock; no wave; industrial rock; post-punk; experimental rock
- Length: 48:40
- Label: Ipecac
- Producer: Seth Manchester; Nicolas Sadler

Daughters chronology
Daughters (2010)	You Won't Get What You Want (2018)

Singles from You Won't Get What You Want
- 1. "Satan in the Wait" Released: July 13, 2018; 2. "The Reason They Hate Me" Released: August 17, 2018; 3. "Long Road, No Turns" Released: October 2, 2018

You Won't Get What You Want is the fourth and final studio album by American rock band Daughters. It was released on October 26, 2018, through Ipecac Recordings, and is the band's only album since their 2013 reformation.

The album was released to universal critical acclaim, with many critics naming it one of the best albums of 2018.

== Promotion ==
On July 13, 2018, Daughters released a single, "Satan in the Wait" from their upcoming album and announced that they were now signed to Mike Patton's Ipecac Records.

On August 17, 2018, Daughters announced the title of the album, and released the second single "The Reason They Hate Me", it was described as "noisier and more abrasive" than the last single. Frontman Alexis Marshall described the song as "a complaint, an expostulation, a critique on the abuse of critique".

The band also announced more tour dates alongside the announcement. On October 2, 2018, Daughters released the third single from the album "Long Road, No Turns", the song was described by Rolling Stone as "another unique beast: off-kilter rhythms pierce through a seething veneer of distortion and Marshall, his voice sounding crystal clear, sings about making mistakes and coming undone." On January 14, 2019, the band released their first-ever music video for the song "Less Sex". The video was directed by the band's former guitarist Jeremy Wabiszczewicz.

== Critical reception ==
Professional ratings
Aggregate scores
Source	Rating
AnyDecentMusic?	8.3/10
Metacritic	87/100
Review scores
Source	Rating
AllMusic	4.5/5 stars
Classic Rock	4/5 stars
Consequence of Sound	A−
Exclaim!	9/10
MusicOMH	4.5/5 stars
Pitchfork	8.0/10
PopMatters	9/10
Punknews	4.5/5 stars
Rolling Stone	3.5/5 stars
Sputnikmusic	4.6/5

You Won't Get What You Want was met with widespread critical acclaim. On Metacritic, which assigns a normalized rating out of 100 to reviews from mainstream critics, the album received an average score of 87, based on 11 reviews, which indicates "universal acclaim". The album was included on numerous end-of-year lists as one of the best albums of 2018.

Pitchfork wrote, "Similar to their Providence art-metal contemporaries in The Body, Daughters' accessibility is directly proportional to their uncompromising compositional choices—hypnotic dissonance, martial drums cranked to incapacitating volumes, scathing vocal repetition, all rendered through impossibly vivid production. This is not music interesting [sic] in growing on you: it consumes and dominates."

PopMatters called it "the perfect return for Daughters. While aspects of the band's creative vision have been altered and their sound has further evolved, the core elements remain intact. The asphyxiating sound has been augmented with the inclusion of longer, heavier sludge influenced moments. The tension the band build is further explored through different means." The album also received a "perfect 10" from Anthony Fantano of The Needle Drop. In 2021, Jacek Szafranowicz described the album as "the most surprising record of 2018", noting that "Less Sex" is a "gorgeous 21st-century blues".

=== Accolades ===
Year-end lists for You Won't Get What You Want
Publication	Accolade	Position	Ref.
The A.V. Club	The best punk and hardcore albums of 2018	—	
The A.V. Club	The A.V. Club's 20 best albums of 2018	18	
BrooklynVegan	BrooklynVegan's Top 50 Albums of 2018	28	
Consequence of Sound	Top 25 Hard Rock + Metal Albums of 2018	4	
Consequence of Sound	Top 50 Albums of 2018	36	
Exclaim!	Exclaim!'s Top 10 Metal and Hardcore Albums Best of 2018	4	
Loudwire	The 30 Best Metal Albums of 2018	12	
musicOMH	musicOMH's Top 50 Albums Of 2018	42	
The Needle Drop	Top 50 Albums of 2018	1	
PopMatters	20 Best Metal Albums of 2018	13	
PopMatters	The 70 Best Albums of 2018	26	
The Quietus	The Quietus Albums of the Year 2018	13	
Rolling Stone	20 Best Metal Albums of 2018	2	
Sputnikmusic	Sputnikmusic's Top 50 Albums of 2018	2	

== Track listing ==
All lyrics are written by Alexis Marshall; all music is composed by Nick Sadler and the rest of Daughters.

No.	Title	Length
1.	"City Song"	5:55
2.	"Long Road, No Turns"	5:04
3.	"Satan in the Wait"	7:06
4.	"The Flammable Man"	2:09
5.	"The Lords Song"	2:45
6.	"Less Sex"	4:47
7.	"Daughter"	4:55
8.	"The Reason They Hate Me"	3:55
9.	"Ocean Song"	7:28
10.	"Guest House"	4:29
Total length:		48:40

== Personnel ==
Credits for You Won't Get What You Want adapted from liner notes

Daughters

- Alexis Marshall – vocals, lyrics
- Jon Syverson – drums
- Nicolas Andrew Sadler – guitar, production
- Samuel Walker – bass guitar

Additional personnel

- Seth Manchester – recording, production
- Heba Kadry – mastering
- Jesse Draxler – artwork
- Shawn Vesinaw – layout
