= Nick Bassett =

American musician

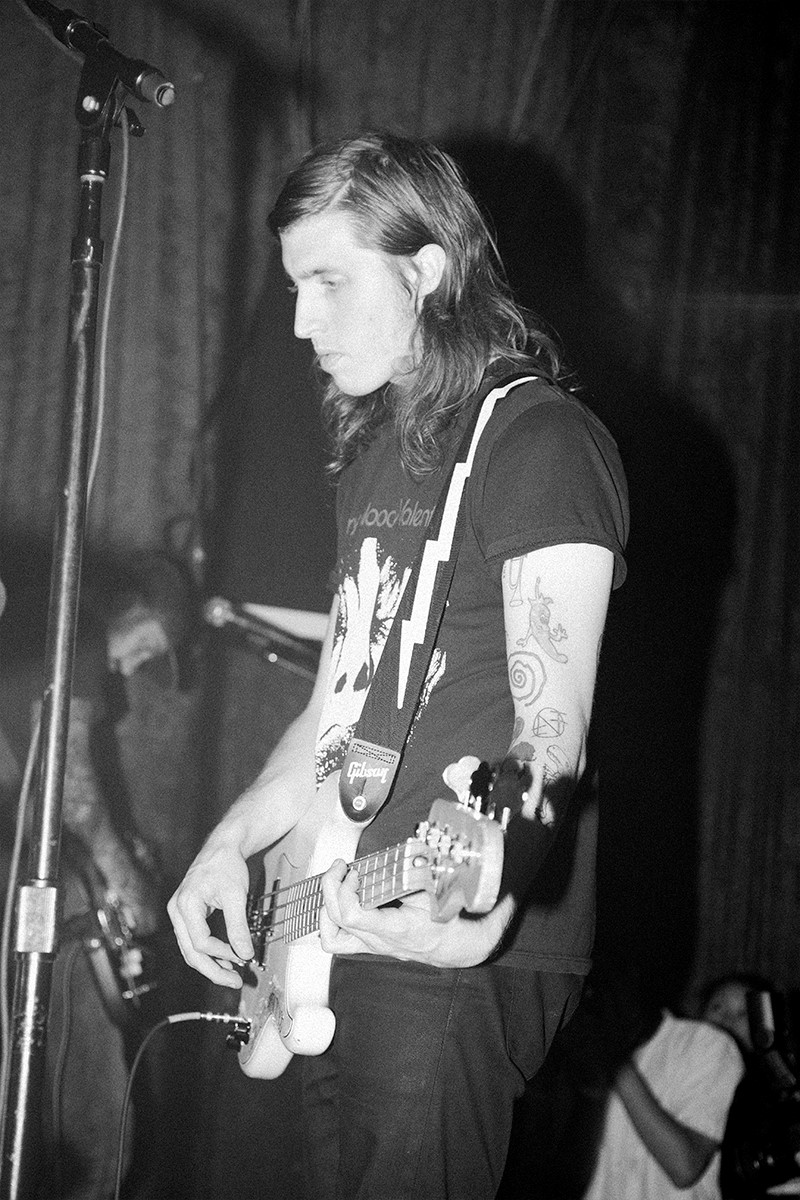
- Bassett in 2017

Background information
- Born: July 28
- Origin: Modesto, California, U.S.
- Genres: Shoegaze, dream pop
- Occupations: Musician; record producer; composer
- Instruments: Guitar; bass; keyboards
- Years active: 2009–present
- Member of: Whirr
- Formerly of: Nothing, Deafheaven, Camera Shy

Nick Bassett is an American musician and record producer from Modesto, California. He was the bassist of shoegaze band Nothing and is the lead guitarist of shoegaze band Whirr. He also played guitar in the original lineup of blackgaze band Deafheaven.

== Career ==
Bassett formed Whirl in October 2009. The band changed its name to Whirr after a musician also named Whirl trademarked the name and threatened legal action. Bassett wrote demo versions of songs and showed them to the other members, after which they decided to play shoegazing-influenced music.

Bassett played bass for Philadelphia shoegaze band Nothing from 2013 to 2018. Prior to his joining, Whirr had toured with Nothing in the spring of 2013, during which he collaborated with Nothing frontman Domenic Palermo on a goth-influenced side project called Death of Lovers. Death of Lovers debuted with Buried Under a World of Roses in October 2013, followed by their first full-length album, The Acrobat, in November 2017.

Bassett formed the indie pop duo Camera Shy with ex-Whirr singer Alexandra Morte in 2014. They released their debut EP, Jack-O-Lantern, on June 24, 2014 and their eponymous debut album on July 14, 2015.

In 2016, Bassett composed the score for Bret Easton Ellis' television series The Deleted.

Bassett collaborated with Cloakroom on their 2017 album Time Well, contributing piano parts.

Whirr released Feels Like You, their third full-length album, in October 2019.

== Discography ==
=== With Whirr ===
- Demo (as Whirl) (2010, self-released)
- Distressor EP (as Whirl) (2010, self-released)
- June (2011, Tee Pee)
- Pipe Dreams (2012, Tee Pee)
- Part Time Punks Sessions (2012, Run For Cover)
- Whirr / Anne (split with Anne) (2012, Run For Cover)
- "Color Change"/"Flat Lining" (split with Monster Movie) (2012, Graveface)
- Around (2013, Graveface)
- Sway (2014, Graveface)
- Whirr / Nothing (split with Nothing) (2014, Run For Cover)
- Feels Like You (2019, Free Whirl)
- Live In Los Angeles (2023, Free Whirl)
- Muta / Blue Sugar (2023, Free Whirl)
- Raw Blue (2024, Free Whirl)
- Speeding / Busy (2024, Free Whirl)

=== With Deafheaven ===
- Roads to Judah (2011, Deathwish)
- Live at The Blacktop (2011, Deathwish)

=== With Death of Lovers ===
- Buried Under a World of Roses (2013, Deathwish)
- The Acrobat (2017, Dais Records)

=== With Camera Shy ===
- Jack-O-Lantern (2014, Run For Cover)
- Crystal Clear (2015, Run For Cover)
- Camera Shy (2015, Run For Cover)

=== With Nothing ===
- Tired of Tomorrow (2016, Relapse)
- Dance on the Blacktop (2018, Relapse)

=== With Cloakroom ===
- Time Well (2017, Relapse)

=== With Silence in the Snow ===
- Levitation Chamber (2019, Prophecy Productions)

=== With Pink Slip ===
- Perpetual Care (2020, self-released)

=== With Oubliette ===
- Big Spin EP (2021, self-released)
- Two Songs (2022, self-released)

=== With Rabies Scare ===
- Killer Buzz (2022, self-released)

=== In film and television ===
- The Deleted (Credited as Composer of Theme & Score, 2016, Directed by Brett-Easton Ellis)
- The Night Ripper (Credited as Composer, 2017, Puppet Combo)
- Night Shift (Credited as Composer, 2018, Puppet Combo)
- Party Favor (Credited as Composer, 2019)
- Direct Appeal (Credited as Composer of Theme, 2019)
- Women & Crime (Credited as Composer of Theme, 2019)
- Keep Sweet (Credited as Composer, 2021)
- Bill Mauldin: If It's Big, Hit It (Credited as Composer, 2021)
- Dio: Dreamers Never Die (Credited as Composer, 2022)

=== Production and audio engineering ===
- Camera Shy – Jack-O-Lantern (2014, Run For Cover)
- Whirr / Crying / Makthaverskan / Camera Shy (2014, Run For Cover)
- Camera Shy – Crystal Clear (2015, Run For Cover)
- Camera Shy – Camera Shy (2015, Run For Cover)
- Death Of Lovers – The Acrobat (2017, Dais Records)
- Night School – Disappear Here (2019, Graveface)
- Night Sins – Portrait In Silver (2019, Funeral Party)
- Fearing – Shadow (2020, Funeral Party)
- Nothing – GEORGE (2020, Self-released)
- Nothing – The Great Dismal (2020, Relapse)
- Luster – Blue Oblivion (2020, Funeral Party)
- White Lighters – S/T (2021, Coming Home)
- Fawning – Illusions of control (2021, Graveface / Nevernotgoth)
- Beachy Head – S/T (2021, Graveface)
- Velvet Gentleman – Burn (2021, Graveface)
- White Lighters – Breaker Boy (2022, Coming Home)
- Night School – Invoke (2022, Graveface)
- The Marshmallow Ghosts – The Collection (2023, Graveface)
- Sparkler – Big Sonic Chill (2023, Flesh and Bone)
- Luster – Dopamine Loop (2023, Funeral Party)
- Precocious Neophyte – Home in the Desert (2023, Graveface)
- Fawning – All Around Me (2024, Graveface / Nevernotgoth)
- Velvet – Romance (2024, Candlepin)
- Dreamend – May You Die Well (2024, Graveface)
- Knifeplay – Live in Seattle (2025, Funeral Party)
- Crushed – No Scope (2025, Ghostly International)
- Night School – For Keeps (2025, Graveface)
- Tony Molina – On this Day (2025, Slumberland)
- Nothing – A Short History of Decay (2026, Run For Cover)
