= Old Wounds =

Old Wounds or old woundsmay refer to:

- Old Wounds (album), a 2008 album by Young Widows
- "Old Wounds" (Doctors), a 2004 television episode
- "Old Wounds" (The Inside episode), a 2005 television episode
- "Old Wounds" (The New Batman Adventures), a 1998 television episode
- "Old Wounds" (The Orville), a 2017 television episode
- "Old Wounds" (Yellowjackets), a 2023 television episode
- "Old Wounds" (song), by Pvris
