= Young Widows =

American rock band

- Origin: Louisville, Kentucky
- Genres: Indie rock, noise rock, post-hardcore
- Years active: 2006–present
- Labels: Temporary Residence, Jade Tree
- Spinoff of: Breather Resist
- Members: Evan Patterson; Nick Thieneman; Jeremy McMonigle
- Past members: Geoff Paton

Young Widows is an American band from Louisville, Kentucky. They have released five full-length albums and seven split EPs.

== History ==
Young Widows formed in 2006 from the ashes of mathcore group Breather Resist. In December 2005, lead singer Steve Sidoni left Breather Resist, and guitarist Evan Patterson and bassist Nick Thieneman assumed the vocal duties. They entered the studio in early 2006 but found that their sound had changed significantly. They then changed the name from Breather Resist to Young Widows.

Preceded by a split 7-inch with Coliseum, their debut full length titled Settle Down City was released in September 2006 on Jade Tree Records. Citing a lack of interest from Jade Tree, the band later moved to Temporary Residence Limited where they released their second album Old Wounds in September 2008. In late 2008 and early 2009, a series of four split 7-inchs were released featuring Young Widows and a different band for every split. These were all released by Temporary Residence, and when put together the covers form one 14x14" picture. Original drummer Geoff Paton was replaced by Jeremy McMonigle in 2008. They have toured with bands such as Pelican, Russian Circles, These Arms Are Snakes, Thursday, The Fall of Troy, La Dispute and Daughters.

Their third album, In and Out of Youth and Lightness was released by Temporary Residence in April 2011 and sees the band taking their sound in a quieter noise rock and gothic rock-influenced direction.

Young Widows released its fourth studio album titled Easy Pain on May 13, 2014, through Temporary Residence.

Young Widows released its fifth studio album titled Power Sucker on March 21, 2025, through Temporary Residence.

== Members ==
=== Current members ===
- Evan Patterson – guitar and vocals (2006–present)
- Nick Thieneman – bass and vocals (2006–present)
- Jeremy McMonigle – drums (2008–present)

=== Former members ===
- Geoff Paton – drums (2006–2008)

== Discography ==
=== Studio albums ===
- Settle Down City (2006, Jade Tree)
- Old Wounds (2008, Temporary Residence)
- In and Out of Youth and Lightness (2011, Temporary Residence)
- Easy Pain (2014, Temporary Residence)
- Power Sucker (2025, Temporary Residence)

=== Split EPs ===
- Coliseum / Young Widows (split with Coliseum) (2006, Auxiliary Records)
- Young Widows / Plows (split with Plows) (2007, Auxiliary Records)
- Split Series Vol. 1 (split with Bonnie 'Prince' Billy) (2009, Temporary Residence)
- Split Series Vol. 2 (split with Melt-Banana) (2009, Temporary Residence)
- Split Series Vol. 3 (split with Pelican) (2009, Temporary Residence)
- Split Series Vol. 4 (split with My Disco) (2009, Temporary Residence)
- Helms Alee / Young Widows (split with Helms Alee) (2014, Sargent House)

=== Singles ===
- "Future Heart" b/w "Rose Window" (2011, Temporary Residence)
- "The Money" b/w "In My Living Room" (2014, Temporary Residence)

=== Live albums ===
- Live Radio Performance April 6, 2009 (2010, Robotic Empire)

=== Compilation contributions ===
- "Dumb" (originally by Nirvana; tribute album In Utero, in Tribute, in Entirety) (2014, Robotic Empire)
- "Smells Like Teen Spirit" (originally by Nirvana; tribute album Whatever Nevermind) (2015, Robotic Empire)
- "Negative Creep" (originally by Nirvana; tribute album Doused in Mud, Soaked in Bleach) (2016, Robotic Empire)

=== Music videos ===
- "Old Skin" (2008)
- "Future Heart" (2011)
- "The Last Young Widow" (2014)
