= Doused in Mud, Soaked in Bleach =

Compilation album (tribute album) by various artists
- Released: April 16, 2016
- Genre: Grunge, post-hardcore
- Label: Robotic Empire

Robotic Empire Nirvana tribute album chronology
| Whatever Nevermind (2015) | Doused in Mud, Soaked in Bleach (2016) |

Doused in Mud, Soaked in Bleach is a tribute album to Nirvana's 1989 debut album, Bleach, performed by various artists. The album was released by Robotic Empire for Record Store Day on April 16, 2016. It also concludes a series Robotic Empire Nirvana tribute albums, which also includes 2014's In Utero, in Tribute, in Entirety (a tribute to In Utero) and Whatever Nevermind (a tribute to Nevermind).

== Song information ==
=== Love Buzz ===
Circa Survive vocalist Anthony Green the group chose to cover "Love Buzz" because it was the first Nirvana song he ever heard and elaborated: "It's simple but hits so hard. I remember listening to it and feeling like 'I could do this' because of how accessible it felt."

=== School ===
Basement vocalist Andrew Fisher said his band chose to cover "School" because of how simple and heavy yet dynamic it was, and elaborated: "We flirted with the idea of trying to make it 'our own' and change it, but because the song is so simple everything we came up with sounded forced and wrong. Instead we thought we'd try our best to do the song justice and so recorded it live and tried to keep it as true to the original as possible."

=== Paper Cuts ===
On their 7-minute-long cover of "Paper Cuts," This Will Destroy You said: "The framework for "Paper Cuts" was a welcome challenge to work on as the track is already doomy and repetitive. Going slow and low seemed to be the way to put our own stamp on the cover while maintaining the rawness and intensity of the original."

== Track listing ==
All tracks are written by Kurt Cobain, except where noted.

| No. | Title | Performed by | Length |
|---|---|---|---|
| 1. | "Blew" | Defeater | 3:19 |
| 2. | "Floyd the Barber" | Thou | 3:07 |
| 3. | "About a Girl" | Beach Slang | 3:29 |
| 4. | "School" | Basement | 2:36 |
| 5. | "Love Buzz" (Robbie van Leeuwen; originally by Shocking Blue) | Circa Survive (feat. Jon Simmons of Balance & Composure) | 3:40 |
| 6. | "Paper Cuts" | This Will Destroy You | 7:01 |
| 7. | "Negative Creep" | Young Widows | 3:12 |
| 8. | "Scoff" | Mean Jeans | 3:31 |
| 9. | "Swap Meet" | Rob Crow's Gloomy Place | 3:50 |
| 10. | "Mr. Moustache" | The Fall of Troy | 3:17 |
| 11. | "Sifting" | Big Hush | 4:22 |
| 12. | "Big Cheese" (Cobain, Krist Novoselic) | Daughters | 3:34 |
| 13. | "Downer" | The Saddest Landscape | 1:56 |

== Reception ==
Professional ratings
Review scores
| Source | Rating |
|---|---|
| AllMusic | 3.5/5 stars |
