= Camera Shy =

Camera Shy may refer to:

- Camera Shy (band), an American indie pop band
- "Camera Shy" (Dexter: Resurrection), an episode of the television series Dexter: Resurrection
- Camera Shy (film), a 2012 Canadian comedy film
