= In and Out of Youth and Lightness =

Studio album by Young Widows
- Released: April 8, 2011
- Recorded: July 26 – October 14, 2010
- Genre: Post-hardcore, noise rock
- Length: 47:39
- Label: Temporary Residence (TRR188)
- Producer: Kevin Ratterman, Young Widows

Young Widows chronology
Old Wounds (2008)	In and Out of Youth and Lightness (2011)	Easy Pain (2014)

Professional ratings
Aggregate scores
Source	Rating
Metacritic	(81/100)
Review scores
Source	Rating
AbsolutePunk	(87%)
AllMusic	4/5 stars
CHARTattack	3.5/5 stars
Pitchfork	(5.7/10)
Rock Sound	(8/10)

In and Out of Youth and Lightness is the third studio album by the American rock band Young Widows. The album was released on April 8, 2011, through Temporary Residence Limited.

The song "Future Heart" was released as a stand-alone limited edition 7" vinyl single with the B-side "Rose Window." A music video directed by Jeremy Johnstone for the song "Future Heart" was released in April 2011.

== Track listing ==
All songs written and composed by Young Widows, all lyrics written by Evan Patterson, except "Right in the End" co-written by Patterson and Dominic Cipolla.

1. "Young Rivers" – 5:45
2. "Future Heart" – 3:25
3. "In and Out of Lightness" – 6:27
4. "Lean on the Ghost" – 6:26
5. "The Muted Man" – 5:17
6. "Right in the End" – 3:01
7. "Miss Tambourine Wrist" – 4:14
8. "White Golden Rings" – 5:49
9. "In and Out of Youth" – 7:15

== Personnel ==
In and Out of Youth and Lightness album personnel as adapted from CD liner notes.

Young Widows

- Evan Patterson – lead vocals, guitars
- Nick Thieneman – bass guitar, backing vocals
- Jeremy McMonigle – drum kit, tambourine, sleigh bells, piano, anvil, triangle

Additional musicians

- Dominic Cipolla – vocals (track 6)
- Jason Gagovski – thunder drum (track 8)
- Amber Estes – vocals (tracks 3, 4, 6, 9)
- Johnathan Glen Wood – vocals (track 4)

Production

- Kevin Ratterman – production, recording, engineering, mixing
- Young Widows – production

Artwork and packaging

- Kathleen Lolley (LolleyLand) – front and back cover art
- Evan Patterson – logo, album title and song title treatments
- Ryan Patterson (Auxiliary Design) – layout, design
- Nick Thieneman – photography
