= Nothing (band) =

American rock band

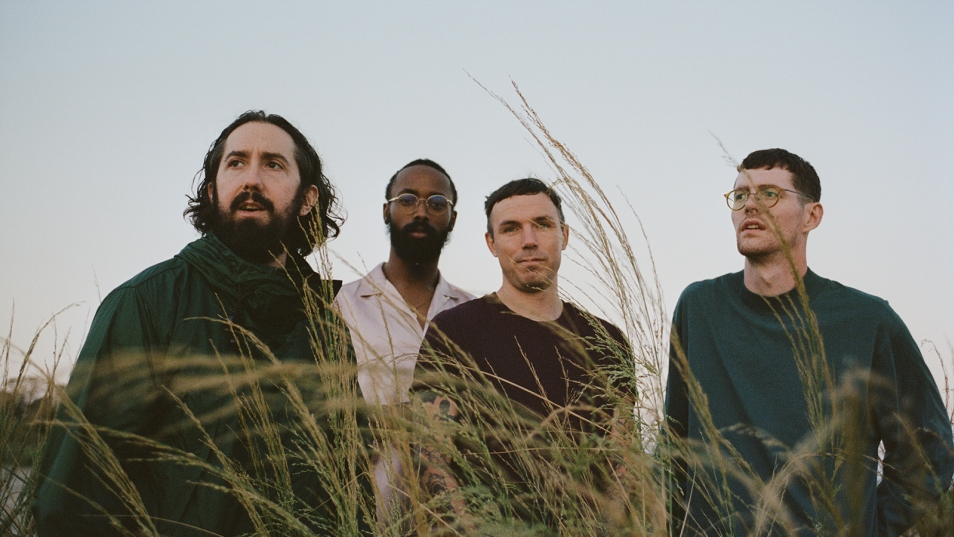
- Nothing press photo for The Great Dismal

Background information
- Also known as: Band of Nothing
- Origin: Philadelphia, Pennsylvania, U.S.
- Genres: Shoegaze; dream pop; post-hardcore; post-rock; slowcore
- Years active: 2010–present
- Labels: Like Glue; Big Love; A389; Relapse; Run for Cover
- Members: Domenic "Nicky" Palermo; Doyle Martin; Zachary Jones; Bobb Bruno; Cam Smith
- Past members: Christina Michelle; Kyle Kimball; Aaron Heard; Brandon Setta; Nick Bassett; Chris Betts; Richie Roxas; Anthony Rossi; Michael Bachich; Joshua Jancewicz; Ryan Grotz
- Website: bandofnothing.com

Nothing is an American shoegaze band from Philadelphia, Pennsylvania. It was formed in 2010 by vocalist-guitarist Domenic "Nicky" Palermo and has had revolving lineup throughout its career, with Palermo being the sole constant member. Longtime guitarist-vocalist Brandon Setta joined in late 2010, sharing songwriting duties with Palermo before departing in 2019.

Nothing self-released several EPs before signing to Relapse Records. They released their debut studio album, Guilty of Everything, in 2014. The follow-up album, Tired of Tomorrow, was released on in 2016. Nothing's third studio album, Dance on the Blacktop, was released in 2018, their fourth studio album, The Great Dismal, was released in 2020, and their fifth studio album, A Short History Of Decay, was released in 2026.

== History ==
Nothing founder Domenic "Nicky" Palermo was previously a member of the hardcore punk band Horror Show. The short-lived band only released a pair of EPs through Jacob Bannon of Converge's Deathwish Inc. label during its existence. Horror Show was put on hold in 2002 when a 20-year old Palermo stabbed a man during a fight and spent two years in jail for aggravated assault and attempted murder; Palermo claimed self-defense. Of this period in his life, Palermo said: "It was kind of a violent time. We were going to shows and kind of, like, fucking shit up for the whole [hardcore] scene". He also performed in XO Skeletons, which featured Wesley Eisold (Give Up the Ghost, Cold Cave).

Following his stint in jail and done with performing in punk bands, Palermo spent a long time soul-searching. He has said, "I didn't know what else to do with my life, what would make me want to wake up every day. I really struggled with that for like four years and, not to sound dramatic or anything, but I thought about blowing my brains out every day". Palermo eventually began making music again, and released a demo, Poshlost, under the name "Nothing" in 2010. Nothing went through several lineup changes over the next few years while releasing two EPs, Suns and Lovers and Downward Years to Come between 2011 and 2012, respectively.

In 2013 Nothing signed to Relapse Records and released the single "Dig", which featured on the band's debut album, Guilty of Everything, released by Relapse on March 4, 2014. To continue promotion for the album, Nothing also released the tracks "Endlessly" and "Bent Nail" for online streaming, and in 2014 it reissued Downward Years to Come.

In August 2013 Nothing toured with Whirr, and as a result, members of Nothing and Whirr formed a side project called Death of Lovers. The two bands also released a split EP in 2014, and Whirr member Nick Bassett (ex-Deafheaven) joined Nothing on bass.

Nothing then signed to Collect Records, but terminated its contract with the label after completing their new record, due to the label's ties to former Turing Pharmaceuticals CEO Martin Shkreli. On December 8, 2015, it was announced that Nothing had re-signed with Relapse Records. Its second album, Tired of Tomorrow, was released on May 13, 2016. The first single from the album, "Vertigo Flowers", debuted on February 23, 2016. John "PBoy" Policastro from the band New Lows joined the band as a live bassist to tour for the record, as Bassett was not able to do all the dates.

The band's third studio album, Dance on the Blacktop, was released on August 24, 2018, by Relapse. It was preceded by the "Zero Day" single on June 4.

After the recording of the album, new bassist Aaron Heard (vocalist for hardcore band Jesus Piece), replaced Bassett. Founding guitarist/vocalist Brandon Setta left the band mid-tour for personal reasons in early 2019 and was replaced by Cloakroom frontman Doyle Martin. Setta continues releasing music under the names White Lighters and You Wish.

On October 30, 2020 The Great Dismal was released on Relapse Records. Promotional videos were released for the songs "Say Less", "Bernie Sanders", "Famine Asylum", "April Ha Ha (Ft. Alex G.)", and "Catch a Fade". Production was handled by Will Yip, who previously produced the band's second record, Tired of Tomorrow. This is the first album to feature Doyle Martin replacing Brandon Setta on guitar and vocals, as well as Aaron Heard replacing longtime bassist Nick Bassett.

In July 2021, Nothing announced a limited edition vinyl-only album titled Don’t Look For Light In Tunnels as a celebration of their tenth anniversary. The album was recorded at Machines with Magnets in Pawtucket, Rhode Island with producer Seth Manchester. The album was "a two part thought experiment" where the "vision was to capture the sound of nothing on both a sonic and subsonic level" and influenced by Alvin Lucier's process music album I Am Sitting in a Room. The album was released on February 18, 2022.

On January 5, 2022, Aaron Heard posted that his few upcoming shows with Nothing would be his last, in order to spend more time raising his son. On February 28, 2022, Gouge Away frontwoman Christina Michelle replaced Heard on bass. In mid-2022, longtime drummer Kyle Kimball left the band to focus on his dark wave project Night Sins. Kimball was later replaced by Zachary Jones. In late 2023, guitarist/multi-instrumentalist Bobb Bruno from Best Coast replaced Michelle on bass.

On February 27, 2026, Nothing released their fifth studio album, A Short History Of Decay.

== Musical style and influences ==
Nothing are described as a cross between heavy metal and shoegaze, while later releases were said to have bordered on a dream pop style. The group's sound is marked by "walls of distorted guitars", "pummeling" drums, "angelic" vocal harmonies and "soul-searching lyrics that tell of hard times and pain of all kinds".

They have cited influences including the Smashing Pumpkins, My Bloody Valentine, Slowdive, Ride, Nirvana, Metallica, Cocteau Twins, the Cure, Hum, Swervedriver, the Smiths, Morrissey, Stone Roses and Oasis.

== Other projects ==
Palermo is also the founder of Slide Away, an annual shoegaze festival. It is named after the song "Slide Away" by The Verve. Palermo also has lyrics to the unrelated "Slide Away" by Oasis tattooed on his arm. The first edition took place in 2024 and was held on March 9 in Philadelphia and March 30 in Los Angeles, headlined by Nothing. In 2025, it took place in New York City, Philadelphia and Los Angeles, and the event is what reunited Whirr and The Pains of Being Pure at Heart. In 2026, it took place in New York, Chicago and Los Angeles, with Hum and Chapterhouse's reunions. Palermo only hosts these events at venues that do not take a merch cut.

== Members ==
=== Current members ===
- Domenic "Nicky" Palermo – vocals, guitar (2010–present)
- Doyle Martin – guitar, backing vocals (2019–present)
- Zachary Jones – drums (2022–present)
- Bobb Bruno – bass (2023–present)
- Cam Smith – guitar, backing vocals (2025–present)

=== Former members ===
- Brandon Setta – guitar, vocals (2010–2019)
- Ryan Grotz – guitar (2010–2011)
- Joshua Jancewicz – bass (2010–2011)
- Michael Bachich – drums (2010–2011)
- Richie Roxas – bass (2011–2013)
- Anthony Rossi – drums (2011–2013)
- Chris Betts – bass (2013)
- Nick Bassett – bass (2013–2018)
- Kyle Kimball – drums (2013–2022)
- Aaron Heard – bass (2018–2022)
- Christina Michelle – bass (2022–2023)

Live / touring musicians

- Joey Bayes – bass (2013)
- John "PBoy" Policastro – bass (2015–2017)
- AJ Annunziata – guitar (2019)
- Ben "Benny" Mead – drums (2022)
- Nah – drums (2022)

Recording Timeline

| Role | Album | | | | |
| Role | Guilty of Everything (2014) | Tired of Tomorrow (2016) | Dance on the Blacktop (2018) | The Great Dismal (2020) | A Short History of Decay (2026) |
|---|---|---|---|---|---|
| Vocals, Guitar | Domenic Palermo | Domenic Palermo | Domenic Palermo | Domenic Palermo | Domenic Palermo |
| Guitar, Vocals | Brandon Setta | Brandon Setta | Brandon Setta | Doyle Martin | Doyle Martin |
| Guitar, Backing vocals | | | | | Cam Smith |
| Bass | Chris Betts | Nick Bassett | Nick Bassett | Aaron Heard | Bobb Bruno |
| Drums | Kyle Kimball | Kyle Kimball | Kyle Kimball | Kyle Kimball | Zachary Jones |

== Discography ==
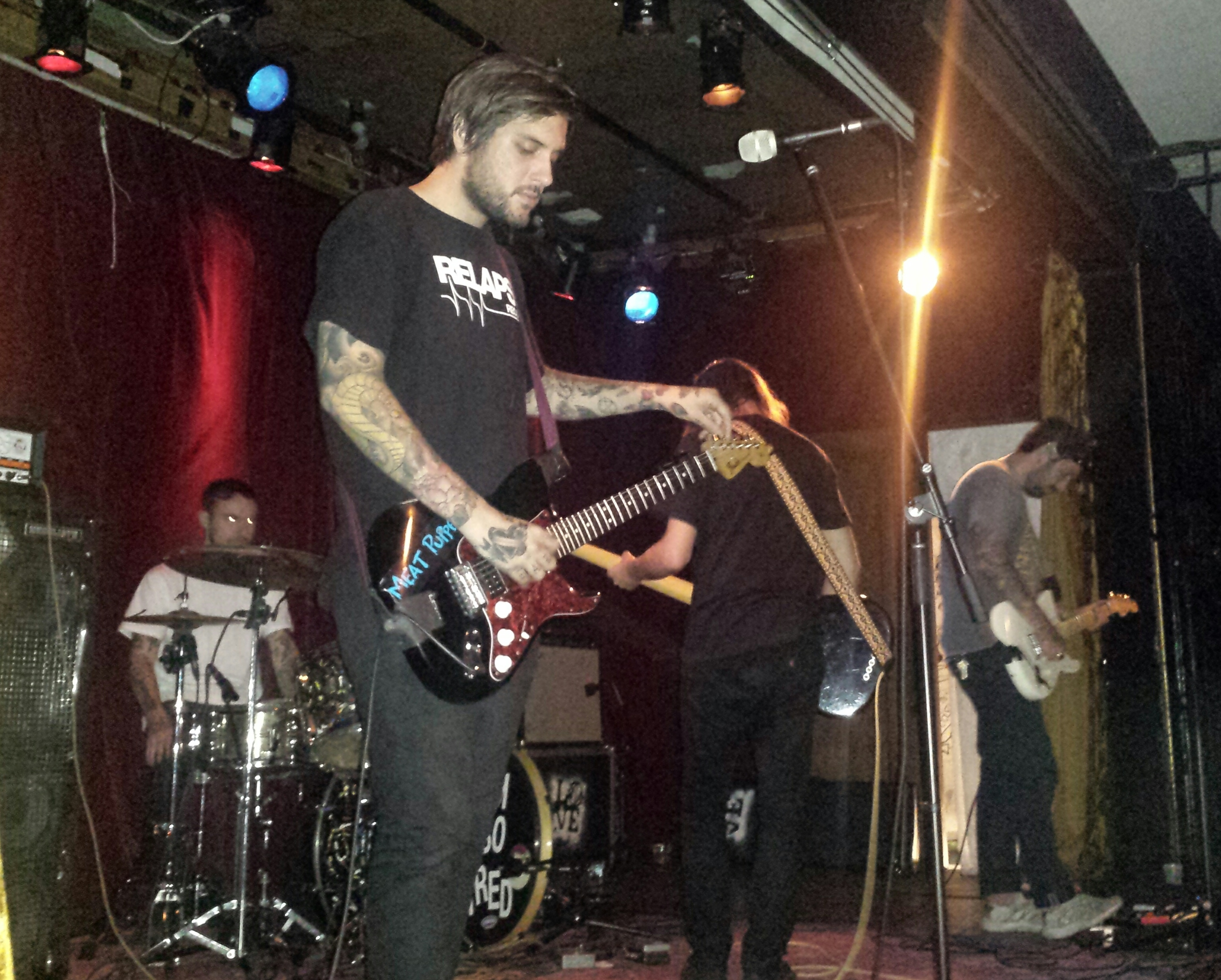
Nothing performing in 2016

=== Studio albums ===
- Guilty of Everything (2014, Relapse)
- Tired of Tomorrow (2016, Relapse)
- Dance on the Blacktop (2018, Relapse)
- The Great Dismal (2020, Relapse)
- A Short History of Decay (2026, Run for Cover)

=== Collaborative albums ===
- When No Birds Sang (with Full of Hell) (2023, Closed Casket Activities)

=== Compilation albums ===
- Spirit of the Stairs - B-Sides & Rarities (2019, Relapse)

=== Live albums ===
- George (A Live Part Time Punks Session, Los Angeles 12.07.2019) (2020, self)
- Auditory Trauma: Nothing Isolation Sessions (2024, Relapse)

=== Demos ===
- Poshlost (2010, Like Glue)

=== EPs ===
- Suns and Lovers (2011, Big Love)
- Downward Years to Come (2012, A389)
- The Great Dismal B-Sides (2021, Relapse)

=== Split releases ===
- Whirr / Nothing (split with Whirr) (2014, Run for Cover)
- Culture Abuse / Nothing (split with Culture Abuse) (2018, New Noise Flexi Collection)
- Splitsville (split with Integrity) (2021, Relapse)

=== Singles ===
- "Last Day in Bouville" (Julian Grefe Edit) (2010, self)
- "Suns and Lovers" (2011, Big Love)
- "Dig" (2013, Relapse)
- "In Metal" (2014, A389)
- "Leave Me Alone" (2015, self)
- "Vertigo Flowers" (2016, Relapse)
- "A.C.D." (2016, Relapse)
- "Nineteen Ninety Heaven" (Ryan Hemsworth Remix) (2016, Relapse)
- "Famous Blue Raincoat (Ortlieb's 2015)" (2016, self)
- "Zero Day" (2018, Relapse)
- "Blue Line Baby" (2018, Relapse)
- "The Carpenter's Son" (2018, Relapse)
- "We Are Real" (2019, self)
- "Bent Nail" demo (2019, self)
- "Say Less" (2020, Relapse)
- "Bernie Sanders" (2020, Relapse)
- "Famine Asylum" (2020, Relapse)
- "Amber Gambler" (2021, Relapse)
- "La La Means I Love You" (2021, Relapse)
- "A Fabricated Life" (10th & D Demo) (2021, Obey)
- "Micha: Those Who Fear Tomorrow" (2021, Relapse)

=== Compilation appearances ===
- "Something in the Way" (Nirvana cover) on Whatever Nevermind (2015, Robotic Empire)
