= Easy Pain =

Studio album by Young Widows
- Released: May 13, 2014
- Recorded: La La Land Studio
- Length: 40:33
- Label: Temporary Residence
- Producer: Kevin Ratterman

Young Widows chronology
In and Out of Youth and Lightness (2011)	Easy Pain (2014)

Easy Pain is the fourth studio album by the American rock band Young Widows. The album was released on May 13, 2014, through Temporary Residence Limited.

Prior to the release of the album, Young Widows performed Easy Pain in its entirety live on January 26, 2014 — four months ahead of the official release date — in Brooklyn, New York. Also to promote the album, Young Widows released the track "Kerosene Girl" for online streaming in February 2014.

== Critical reception ==
Professional ratings
Aggregate scores
Source	Rating
Metacritic	82/100
Review scores
Source	Rating
AllMusic	4.5/5 stars
Alternative Press	4.5/5 stars
Blurt	4/5 stars
Classic Rock	4/5 stars
Exclaim!	9/10
Kerrang!	4/5 stars
NME	5/10
Pitchfork	7.9/10
Under the Radar	8/10
The 405	8/10

At Alternative Press, Jason Pettigrew rated the album four-and-a-half stars out of five, remarking how "Easy Pain reminds you of how horrible the world can be, as well as the catharsis you can achieve if you'd only just immerse yourself in the maelstrom."

== Track listing ==
No.	Title	Length
1.	"Godman"	5:05
2.	"Cool Night"	5:03
3.	"Kerosene Girl"	5:23
4.	"Doomed Moon"	5:16
5.	"Gift of Failure"	4:21
6.	"Bird Feeder"	4:58
7.	"King Sol"	5:04
8.	"The Last Young Widow"	5:23
Total length:		40:33
