= Settle Down City =

Studio album by Young Widows
- Released: September 12, 2006
- Recorded: April 2006
- Genres: Post-hardcore, noise rock
- Length: 35:26
- Label: Jade Tree

Young Widows chronology
Coliseum / Young Widows (2006)	Settle Down City (2006)	Young Widows / Plows (2007)

Settle Down City is the debut album by the American rock band Young Widows. The album was released on September 12, 2006 through Jade Tree.

In December 2005, vocalist Steve Sindoni parted ways with the band Breather Resist, leaving Evan Patterson, Nick Thieneman and Geoff Paton to write and record a follow-up to their debut album Charmer (2004) as a three-piece. The remaining three members entered the studio in April 2006 Settle Down City, but decided that their sound had changed too much and changed their name and released the album under the name Young Widows instead.

Settle Down City received generally favorable reviews from music critics.

== Track listing ==
1. "Settle Down City" – 2:56
2. "Almost Dead Beat" – 4:05
3. "Glad He Ate Her" – 3:31
4. "Small Talk" – 4:31
5. "Formererer" – 2:03
6. "Bruised Knees" – 4:11
7. "Mirrorfucker" – 3:02
8. "The Charmers" – 3:29
9. "New Forest" – 2:15
10. "The First Half" – 1:39
11. "We Don't Know" – 3:44
