= In Utero, in Tribute, in Entirety =

2014 tribute compilation album by various artists

Compilation album (tribute album) by various artists
- Released: April 15, 2014
- Genre: Grunge, post-hardcore
- Length: 46:14
- Label: Robotic Empire

Robotic Empire Nirvana tribute album chronology
In Utero, in Tribute, in Entirety (2014)	Whatever Nevermind (2015)

In Utero, in Tribute, in Entirety is a tribute album to Nirvana's 1993 third and final album, In Utero, by various artists. The album was released through Robotic Empire on April 15, 2014, and an exclusive version was released for Record Store Day on April 19, 2014. The compilation, which represents Robotic Empire's 100th release overall and 15th anniversary as a business, took over 7 years to make because of "extended delays and legal wrangling." In the time it took to make the album, Jay Reatard died and These Arms Are Snakes, Thursday and Daughters disbanded (though the latter reformed shortly before the release), making their contributions some of the last music they recorded. An unmastered version of Jay Reatard's "Frances Farmer Will Have Her Revenge on Seattle" leaked online a few years prior to the official release of the album.

About the release and the history of the label, Robotic Empire's head Andy Low said: "It has been a privilege to introduce so many unique bands to like-minded freaks over the past 15 years. Looking back at what's transpired almost seems unreal, and even with a shameful carbon footprint of many thousand plastic circles — I can safely say that it has been an honor to work with the artists we have, and a hearty thank you is due to all who've listened thus far. I genuinely hope you'll enjoy this tribute to one of the bands who first showed me the strange side of music. Nirvana was truly one of the greats, and we've done our best to craft an appropriate homage to so many people's all-time favorite band."

For Record Store Day 2015, Robotic Empire released Whatever Nevermind, a tribute to Nirvana's 1991 album Nevermind.

== Song information ==
=== Radio Friendly Unit Shifter ===
Daughters' vocalist Alexis Marshall has said the song they contributed the album, "Radio Friendly Unit Shifter" had been recorded years before the band split up, with the exception of the vocals which Marshall was postponing on recording since Daughters was at the time broken up. However the label intervened and told Marshall if he wasn't going to do it, they would get Steve Brooks of Torche to sing on the track instead since Marshall was taking so long. Marshall was not happy about this and recorded vocals for the track later that same week. However looking back Marshall is not happy with the recording claiming he "really mailed it in" saying it's "disappointing" that he did it out of spite.

== Track listing ==
All tracks are written by Kurt Cobain, except where noted.

No.	Title	Performed by	Length
1.	"Serve the Servants"	Pygmy Lush	6:26
2.	"Scentless Apprentice" (Cobain, Dave Grohl, Krist Novoselic)	Circa Survive	3:53
3.	"Heart-Shaped Box"	These Arms Are Snakes	4:44
4.	"Rape Me"	Thursday	2:53
5.	"Frances Farmer Will Have Her Revenge on Seattle"	Jay Reatard	4:09
6.	"Dumb"	Young Widows	2:01
7.	"Very Ape"	Mean Jeans	1:32
8.	"Milk It"	Thou	3:59
9.	"Pennyroyal Tea"	Whirr	4:03
10.	"Radio Friendly Unit Shifter"	Daughters	5:43
11.	"Tourette's"	Ceremony	1:32
12.	"All Apologies"	Black Math Horseman	5:19

== Reception ==
Professional ratings
Review scores
Source	Rating
AllMusic	3/5 stars
