= Jon Syverson =

American drummer (born 1980)

- Syverson at Hellfest 2019

Background information
- Born: Jonathan Alan Syverson; August 21, 1980 (age 46); Wrentham, Massachusetts, U.S.
- Genres: Grindcore; art punk; heavy metal; noise rock; experimental rock; industrial rock
- Occupations: Musician; songwriter
- Instruments: Drums
- Years active: 1994–present

Jonathan Alan Syverson (born August 21, 1980) is an American musician and songwriter, best known as the drummer of the rock band Daughters since 2002. He has also handled drumming duties for As the Sun Sets and The Color of Violence, and more recently Unsane. Recently Jon also joined up with another Providence band called Snowbird. Snowbird has Jon on drums along with Steve Murphy.

He was the main songwriter for As the Sun Sets and would often record guitars or bass in the studio for technical parts that he had written. When As The Sun Sets disbanded in 2002, he formed Daughters with long-time friend and bandmates Alexis Marshall and Jeremy Wabiszczewicz and was at first the main songwriters for that band. Daughters then recruited Nicholas Andrew Sadler to play guitar and share song writing duties with Jon. Jon and Nicholas had both been guitar players (with Jon later taking over drum duties) in the Providence-based band Crippler Crossface which Nicholas joined when he was 15 years old. Crippler Crossface also featured Alexis Marshall as vocalist. For a brief period during his days as drummer for As The Sun Sets, he also played guitar in a band with Mark Castillo of Bury Your Dead.

Syverson has many projects and bands that are still currently active touring, writing music or doing studio work. He was asked in 2008 to record drums for The Color of Violence featuring two current members of From First to Last; drummer Derek Bloom and guitarist/backup vocalist Travis Richter.

== Discography ==
=== As The Sun Sets ===
- 1999/2004 Each Individual Voice Is Dead in the Silence (Moment of Clarity/Trash Art/City of Hell)
- 2001 Limited Summer Tour CD-EP. (Self-Released)
- 2002 7744 (Undecided Records)
- 2002 8949 (Trash Art)

=== Daughters ===
- Daughters 7-inch EP (City of Hell, 2002)
- Canada Songs LP (Robotic Empire, 2003) – CD/LP
- Live From CBGB's (City of Hell, 2004 / 2008) – CD
- Hell Songs LP (Hydra Head Records, 2006) – CD/LP
- Daughters (Hydra Head Records, 2010)
- You Won't Get What You Want (Ipecac Recordings, 2018)

=== The Color of Violence ===
- Youthanize (Epitaph Records, 4/7/09)
