= Camera Shy (band) =

American indie pop band (2014–2017)

- Origin: Oakland, California
- Genres: Indie pop, twee pop
- Years active: 2014–2017
- Label: Run for Cover
- Spinoff of: Whirr
- Past members: Nick Bassett; Alexandra Morte

Camera Shy was an American indie pop band from Oakland, California. The duo consisted of instrumentalist Nick Bassett (also of Whirr and formerly of Nothing) and vocalist Alexandra Morte (also of Night School and formerly of Whirr). They released two EPs and one full-length album.

== History ==
Camera Shy was formed in 2014. After signing with Run for Cover Records, the band released their debut EP, Jack-o-Lantern, on June 9, 2014. It was followed by the "Crystal Clear" single on April 18, 2015, which included a cover of the Misfits' "She" as one of the two B-sides.

Camera Shy released their eponymous debut studio album on July 14, 2015.

On November 10, 2017, Camera Shy was featured on the expanded version of the album Transistor by dream pop band Monster Movie, contributing with a cover version of the song "Chances Are High".

== Influences ==
In contrast to the "heavy shoegaze" style associated with the duo's other projects, Camera Shy's music draws inspiration from indie and twee acts such as Belle and Sebastian, The Smiths, The Sundays, The Softies and the associated Sarah Records catalog.

== Discography ==
=== Studio albums ===
- Camera Shy (2015, Run for Cover)

=== Singles and EPs ===
- Jack-o-Lantern (2014, Run for Cover)
- "Crystal Clear" (2015, Run for Cover)
