= Pipe Dreams (Whirr album) =

Studio album by Whirr
- Released: March 13, 2012
- Studio: The Atomic Garden Recording Studio
- Genres: Shoegaze; dream pop; noise rock
- Length: 36:07
- Labels: Tee Pee Records, Graveface Records
- Producer: Whirr

Whirr chronology
Distressor (2010)	Pipe Dreams (2012)	Around (2013)

Alternate cover
- 2014 reissue cover

Alternate cover
- 2026 reissue cover

Professional ratings
Review scores
Source	Rating
AllMusic	3.5/5 stars
Pitchfork	7.5/10
PopMatters	8/10 stars

Pipe Dreams is the debut studio album by the shoegaze band Whirr, released on March 13, 2012 by Tee Pee Records. The album served as a follow-up to Distressor, the band's critically acclaimed debut EP.

== Reception ==
Reception for Pipe Dreams was generally positive. Reviewers paid particular attention to the song "Formulas and Frequencies", with Steven Spoerl of PopMatters saying that the song "[was a] haunting acoustic track that utilizes a piano in stunning fashion and really puts a distinguishing mark on the album’s willingness to take unexpected directions in experimentation.", while Martin Douglas of Pitchfork said, "For starters, few shoegaze albums would have the moxie to include a song like "Formulas and Frequencies", which explores texture with an adventurousness that goes beyond tweaking effects pedals. Built around acoustic guitar, piano, and singer Alexandra Morte's floaty soprano, the song is melancholy almost to the point of being a dirge, a slow drift that inches toward the six-minute mark." Ned Raggett of AllMusic said that calling the song "Formulas and Frequencies" felt like "almost a bit of a dare".

== Pipe Dreams Redux ==
On October 7, 2014, Pipe Dreams was reissued by Whirr's then-current label, Graveface Records. This reissue was remixed and remastered by original engineer, Jack Shirley, as well as featuring a resequenced track listing and new artwork to present the album the "way the band intended you hear/see it."

This version of Pipe Dreams was subsequently reissued on March 31, 2026 by Free Whirl Records and Funeral Party.

== Track listing ==
Original 2012 Release

No.	Title	Length
1.	"Reverse"	3:18
2.	"Junebouvier"	3:45
3.	"Bogus"	3:59
4.	"Flashback"	4:07
5.	"Formulas and Frequencies"	5:54
6.	"Home Is Where My Head Is"	2:16
7.	"Toss"	2:24
8.	"Hide"	3:08
9.	"Wait"	3:59
10.	"Reverie"	3:17
Total length:		36:07

2014 'Redux' Reissue

No.	Title	Length
1.	"Reverse"	3:21
2.	"Home Is Where My Head Is"	3:52
3.	"Flashback"	4:19
4.	"Bogus"	2:42
5.	"Reverie"	3:04
6.	"Wait"	4:02
7.	"Junebouvier"	3:47
8.	"Formulas and Frequencies"	5:57
9.	"Toss"	2:25
10.	"Hide"	3:11
Total length:		36:40

== Personnel ==
=== Whirr ===
- Loren Rivera – vocals, guitar, lyrics
- Alexandra Morte – vocals, keyboards, lyrics
- Nick Bassett – guitar, lyrics
- Eddie Salgado – bass guitar, lyrics
- Sergio Miranda – drums, percussion, cover art, lyrics
- Joseph Bautista – guitar, lyrics

=== Other personnel ===
- Nick Schuller – artwork, layout
- Jack Shirley – engineering, mixing, mastering
- JDNNSES – photography
