= Whatever Nevermind =

Compilation album (tribute album) by various artists
- Released: April 18, 2015
- Genre: Grunge, post-hardcore
- Label: Robotic Empire

Robotic Empire Nirvana tribute album chronology
In Utero, in Tribute, in Entirety (2014)	Whatever Nevermind (2015)	Doused in Mud, Soaked in Bleach (2016)

Whatever Nevermind is a tribute album to Nirvana's 1991 second studio album, Nevermind, by various artists. The album was released by Robotic Empire for Record Store Day on April 18, 2015, in vinyl and digital formats. Robotic Empire previously released In Utero, in Tribute, in Entirety — a tribute to Nirvana's third and final studio album In Utero — for Record Store Day 2014. Whatever Nevermind also coincides with the label's 16th anniversary, and celebrates this fact by cataloging the album as the label's 116th release.

Robotic Empire streamed Circa Survive's cover of "Drain You" along with the album's announcement on March 25, 2015.

== Song information ==
=== Drain You ===
Circa Survive guitarist Brendan Ekstrom commented on their cover, stating: "There are different ways to approach covering a band. For us, doing a Nirvana song takes us back to a very raw place that we were in when we were young and just falling in love with music. We didn't want to say 'here's what this song would've sounded like if Circa wrote it.' It was way more fun for us to live in their energy and pay homage to their influence by just rocking the shit out of it and keeping it raw."

== Track listing ==
All tracks are written by Kurt Cobain, except where noted.

No.	Title	Performed by	Length
1.	"Smells Like Teen Spirit" (Cobain, Dave Grohl, Krist Novoselic)	Young Widows	3:11
2.	"In Bloom"	Torche	4:28
3.	"Come as You Are"	Kylesa	5:18
4.	"Breed"	Cave In	3:12
5.	"Lithium"	Boris	5:16
6.	"Polly"	La Dispute	2:28
7.	"Territorial Pissings" (Cobain, Chet Powers)	White Reaper	2:05
8.	"Drain You"	Circa Survive	3:45
9.	"Lounge Act"	Touché Amoré	2:54
10.	"Stay Away"	Wrong	3:07
11.	"On a Plain"	Pygmy Lush	5:23
12.	"Something in the Way"	Nothing	5:06

Bonus 7"
No.	Title	Performed by	Length
1.	"Endless, Nameless"	Thou	7:05
2.	"Even In His Youth"	Thou	3:13

== Reception ==
Professional ratings
Review scores
Source	Rating
AllMusic	4/5 stars
