= Guilty of Everything =

Studio album by Nothing
- Released: March 4, 2014
- Recorded: December 2012; Uniform Recording, Philadelphia, Pennsylvania
- Genre: Shoegaze; noise rock; slowcore; dream pop; alternative rock
- Length: 38:41
- Label: Relapse
- Producer: Jeff Zeigler; Dominic Palermo; Brandon Setta

Nothing chronology
Downward Years to Come (2012)	Guilty of Everything (2014)	Whirr / Nothing (2014)

Singles from Guilty of Everything
- 1. "Dig" Released: August 8, 2013; 2. "Bent Nail" Released: March 31, 2014

Guilty of Everything is the debut studio album by the American shoegaze band Nothing, released on March 4, 2014 by Relapse Records. It is the only album to feature Chris Betts on bass and the first to feature Kyle Kimball on drums.

== Musical style ==
The band's musical style has been described as a mixture of 1990s shoegaze, noise rock and slowcore, and also as "heavy dream pop" and "billowy alt-rock." Nevertheless, the band's sound differs from other shoegaze acts' in its loudness and heaviness, leading to comparisons to My Bloody Valentine's Loveless (1991), Smashing Pumpkins and Dinosaur Jr. Nothing has also been said to stay "current by also giving nods to the post-Brand New indie rock sound." According to Stephen Carlick of Exclaim!, Nothing's use of "towering distorted guitars, soaring falsettos and slamming, snare-heavy percussion" evoke "Slowdive's biggest moments, albeit with a little more passion." The vocals of lead singer Domenic Palermo, which are "hushed and buried in the mix," have been compared to Chapterhouse in terms of harmony.

== Release and promotion ==
Prior to the album's release, the first single, "Dig", debuted on August 8, 2013, via Stereogum. A music video for the track "Bent Nail", directed by Don Argott, was released on March 31, 2014, featuring a cameo appearance by singer-songwriter Kurt Vile. On May 26, 2015, a special LGBT vinyl edition was released, available only on Relapse Records' web store. This version featured alternate artwork, with the standard white flag altered to a Rainbow Pride flag and "electric blue with rainbow splatter" vinyl. With each purchase, 50 cents each was donated to the LGBT charities New Alternatives (an organization dedicated to helping homeless LGBT youth in New York City) and the It Gets Better Project.

== Reception ==
=== Critical reception ===
Professional ratings
Aggregate scores
Source	Rating
Metacritic	77/100
Review scores
Source	Rating
AbsolutePunk	8.0/10
AllMusic	4.5/5 stars
Alternative Press	4/5 stars
The Boston Globe	favorable
Exclaim!	7/10
Pitchfork	(6.9/10)
PopMatters	8/10
Rock Sound	9/10

The aggregate review site Metacritic assigned an average score of 77 out of 100 to the album based on 11 reviews, indicating "generally favorable reviews".

AbsolutePunk staff critic Blake Solomon stated that "Guilty of Everything is the sort of first album that takes itself too seriously in the most endearing way—it's something that must be purged before a band can move on." Tim Sendra of AllMusic wrote: "Forget about shoegaze or metal or noise rock or any other genre; this is stark, dramatic music that comes from pain and has been crafted into high art that will move and inspire listeners lucky enough to hear it." At Alternative Press, Brian Shultz rated the album 4 stars out of 5, saying that "occasionally, this style of music gives way to too much meandering or noise for the sake of it, but Nothing's melodic and encompassing LP debut is guilty of neither." The Boston Globe critic Michael Andor Brodeur described the album as "a storm of shoegaze, noise-rock, and slow-core, surging together into something lovely and lethal."

Stephen Carlick of Exclaim! commented that "Guilty of Everything is thus an emotional affair, but it's balanced by moments of grandness." Pitchfork critic Ian Cohen described the album as "loud, distorted and heavy, but not aggressive." Gary Suarez of PopMatters wrote that "Guilty of Everything offers shockingly little beyond what was already on offer by the mid-'90s", but added, "Yet as it so happens, the record fares remarkably better than most of those moldy oldies they’ve already been compared with, albeit for banal reasons." Rock Sound critic Andy Richie stated: "Individually, tracks like 'Hymn to the Pillory' and 'Somersault' aren’t particularly staggering, but as a whole body of work it really is something else."

Naomi Zeichner of BuzzFeed described the track "Endlessly" as "Built to Spill bruised up and melted into a puddle."

=== Accolades and lists ===
Publication	Country	Work	Accolade	Year	Rank
Spin	US	Guilty of Everything	The Best Overlooked Albums of 2014 So Far	2014	—
Rolling Stone	US	"Bent Nail"	Top 25 Songs of 2014 So Far	2014	24
BuzzFeed	US	"Endlessly"	73 Songs You Need in Your Life This Spring	2014	49

== Track listing ==
All tracks are written by Domenic Palermo and Brandon Setta.

No.	Title	Length
1.	"Hymn to the Pillory"	4:41
2.	"Dig"	4:02
3.	"Bent Nail"	2:57
4.	"Endlessly"	4:13
5.	"Somersault"	4:30
6.	"Get Well"	4:32
7.	"Beat Around the Bush"	4:05
8.	"B&E"	5:18
9.	"Guilty of Everything"	4:23
Total length:		38:41

== Personnel ==
Guilty of Everything album personnel adapted from CD liner notes.

Nothing

- Domenic Palermo – vocals, guitar, production
- Brandon Setta – vocals, guitar, production
- Chris Betts – bass
- Kyle Kimball – drums, percussion

Additional personnel

- Jeff Zeigler – producer, mixing, engineering at Uniform Recordings
- Heba Kadry – mastering
- Orion Landau – design

== Charts ==
Chart (2014)	Peak position
US Billboard 200	195
US Independent Albums	37
US Top Heatseekers	5
