= Hell Songs =

Studio album by Daughters
- Released: August 8, 2006
- Recorded: March 2006 at Mad Oak Studios in Allston, MA and Translator Audio in Brooklyn, NY
- Genres: Mathcore; noise rock
- Length: 23:08
- Label: Hydra Head
- Producers: Andrew Schneider, Daughters

Daughters chronology
| Canada Songs (2003) | Hell Songs (2006) | Daughters (2010) |

Hell Songs is the second studio album by American rock band Daughters, released on August 8, 2006, through Hydra Head Records. Despite keeping the band's earlier mathcore sound, it employs a completely different vocal style, as none of Marshall's screamed vocals that were prominent on the aforementioned material are included on the record.

Professional ratings
Review scores
| Source | Rating |
|---|---|
| Alt Press | 4/5 stars |
| LAS Magazine | 7.5/10 stars |
| Ox-Fanzine | (7/10) |
| Pitchfork | (6.7/10) |
| PopMatters | 8/10 stars |
| Sputnikmusic | 4/5 stars |
| Tiny Mix Tapes | 4.5/5 marks |

== Track listing ==
All music composed by Jon Syverson, Nicholas Sadler and Samuel Walker, all lyrics written by Alexis Marshall

| No. | Title | Length |
|---|---|---|
| 1. | "Daughters Spelled Wrong" | 1:41 |
| 2. | "Fiery" | 1:27 |
| 3. | "Recorded Inside a Pyramid" | 3:26 |
| 4. | "X-Ray" (originally titled "Boner X-Ray" on advance copies of the CD) | 0:49 |
| 5. | "Feisty Snake-Woman" (originally titled "First Snake-Woman" on advance copies of the CD) | 2:13 |
| 6. | "Providence by Gaslight" | 1:53 |
| 7. | "Hyperventilationsystem" | 2:45 |
| 8. | "Crotch Buffet" | 1:07 |
| 9. | "Cheers Pricks" | 6:00 |
| 10. | "The Fuck Whisperer" | 1:47 |
| Total length: | | 23:08 |

Japanese Version
| No. | Title | Length |
|---|---|---|
| 1. | "And Then the C.H.U.D.S. Came / Mike Morowitz, the Fantasy Fuck" | 2:34 |
| 2. | "Hello Assholes" | 0:43 |
| 3. | "X-Ray" | 1:16 |
| 4. | "Jones from Indiana" | 1:05 |
| 5. | "Nurse, Would You Please Prep the Patient for Sexual Doctor" | 1:23 |
| 6. | "Damn Those Blood Suckers and Their Good Qualities" | 1:24 |
| 7. | "Fur Beach" | 1:05 |
| 8. | "Flattery is a Bunch of Fucking Bullshit / Room Full of Hard-Ons and Nowhere to Sit Down" | 1:36 |
| 9. | "I Slept With Daughters and All I Got Was This Lousy Song Written About Me" | 1:02 |
| 10. | "Pants, Meet Shit" | 1:01 |
| 11. | "The Ghost with the Most" | 2:28 |
| 12. | "I Don't Give a Shit About Wood, I'm Not a Chemist / My Stereo Has Mono and So Does My Girlfriend" | 2:43 |

The Japanese imported edition features twelve live bonus tracks under the sub-title "Live at CBGB"

== Personnel ==
Daughters
- Alexis Marshall – vocals
- Nicholas Andrew Sadler – guitar
- Brent Frattini – guitar
- Samuel M. Walker – bass
- Jon Syverson – drums

Additional musicians

- Ryan McGuire – double bass on "Providence by Gaslight"
- Forbes Graham – trumpet, euphonium on "Providence by Gaslight"
- Mia Matsumiya – violin on "Providence by Gaslight"
Production and recording
- Andrew Schneider – production, mixing
- Daughters – production
- Nick Zampiello – mastering
- Devin Charette – additional engineering, assistance
- Ethan Dussalt – help
- Bob Maloney – help
- Bo Dixon – help

Artwork and design

- Alexis Marshall – art direction
- Steven Vallot – album art
- Aaron Turner – album construction
