= Anne (band) =

Dream pop band from Portland, Oregon

Anne was an American dream pop band from Portland, Oregon.

== History ==
Anne began in 2010 with the release of a demo. Following this, they released a mixtape titled Mixtape One. In 2011, Anne released their first full-length album, Dream Punx, via A389 Recordings. In 2012, Anne released a split with the band Whirr. In 2012, Anne released an EP on Run for Cover Records titled Power Exchange. In 2013, Anne released an EP titled Jerusalem. In 2014, Anne released their second full-length album titled Pulling Chain via Run for Cover Records.

== Band members ==
- David Lindell (Vocals/Instrumentation)
- Andrew Zilar (Drums)
- Jared Ridabok (Drums)

== Discography ==
Studio albums

- Dream Punx (2011, A389 Recordings)
- Pulling Chain (2014, Run for Cover)

EPs

- Power Exchange (2012, Run for Cover)

Splits

- Anne/Whirr (2012, Run for Cover)

Mixtapes

- Mixtape One (2010, self-released)
- Mixtape Two (2012, Run for Cover)

Demos

- Demo (2010, self-released)
