= Old Wounds (album) =

Studio album by Young Widows
- Released: September 9, 2008
- Recorded: January 2008
- Venue: The Middle East (Cambridge, MA); The Subterranean (Chicago, IL); The Gagovcity Mansion ; (Valparaiso, IN); Death By Audio (Brooklyn, NY)
- Studio: GodCity (Salem, MA)
- Genre: Post-hardcore, noise rock
- Length: 32:35
- Label: Temporary Residence (TRR138)
- Producer: Kurt Ballou

Young Widows chronology
Young Widows / Plows (2007)	Old Wounds (2008)	Split Series Vol. 1 (2009)

Old Wounds is an album by the American rock band Young Widows. While it's often considered to be the band's second official studio album, Old Wounds features a compilation of studio recordings, live recordings and composite songs with a mix of studio and live components. The album was released on September 9, 2008, through Temporary Residence Limited — the band's first through the label. Old Wounds was produced by Converge guitarist Kurt Ballou and also features guest vocals from Converge bassist Nate Newton.

== Reception ==
Upon release, the album was met with generally positive reviews. Writing for AllMusic, Jim Allen gave the album four-out-of-five stars and said:

Their second album, Old Wounds, explodes with overloaded basslines, assaultive vocals, and beyond-distorted guitars, but there's an underlying sense of control here (more obvious on some tracks than on others) that makes the crucial difference between static and statement.

Writing for Seattle newspaper The Stranger, Brian Cook also gave the album four-out-of-five stars and said:

Their second full-length, Old Wounds, is full of the same grit that marks the finest punk records but succeeds on a grander scale thanks to its remarkable restraint. The band do achieve some spectacular unglued moments, but the album really shines when they rein in the assault.

Jason Crock of Pitchfork score the album slightly lower with a rating of 6.6/10.0 and said:

Though it's been two years since Settle Down City, the methods on Old Wounds are commendable even if the results are mixed; more artists would do well to work fast and in front of crowd as often as possible. Better to lighten the weight of expectation than take so much time crafting "statements" and lose sight of what compels you as a band. Should Young Widows continue to record this way, the band still fills its niche as cannily as any of their nu-pigfuck peers, while clearly making an effort to push those sounds and ideas someplace more distinctive.

== Track listing ==
All lyrics are written by Evan Patterson, except where noted; all music is composed by Jeremy McMonigle, Evan Patterson, Nick Theineman

No.	Title	Lyrics	Recorded at	Length
1.	"Took a Turn"	Evan Patterson	GodCity Recording Studio (Salem, MA)	3:17
2.	"Old Skin"	E. Patterson	GodCity Recording Studio (Salem, MA)	1:47
3.	"Mr. No Harm"	E. Patterson	The Middle East (Cambridge, MA)	2:16
4.	"The Guitar"	E. Patterson	GodCity Recording Studio (Salem, MA)	2:51
5.	"Lucky and Hardheaded"	E. Patterson	GodCity Recording Studio (Salem, MA)	2:20
6.	"21st Century Invention"	Ryan Patterson	GodCity Recording Studio (Salem, MA); Death By Audio (Brooklyn, NY)	4:07
7.	"The Heat is Here"	E. Patterson	GodCity Recording Studio (Salem, MA)	1:51
8.	"Delay Your Pressure"	Nick Theineman	GodCity Recording Studio (Salem, MA); The Middle East (Cambridge, MA); The Subterranean (Chicago, IL)	3:52
9.	"Let Him Be"	E. Patterson	GodCity Recording Studio (Salem, MA); The Subterranean (Chicago, IL); Death By Audio (Brooklyn, NY); The Gagovcity Mansion (Valparaiso, IN)	2:21
10.	"Feelers"	E. Patterson	GodCity Recording Studio (Salem, MA); The Middle East (Cambridge, MA)	2:33
11.	"Swamped and Agitated"	E. Patterson	GodCity Recording Studio (Salem, MA)	5:19

== Personnel ==
Old Wounds personnel and recording history adapted from CD liner notes.

=== Young Widows ===
- Jeremy McMonigle – drums (tracks 1–3, 5–11), tambourine (tracks 7, 9), shaker (tracks 9, 11), jingle stick (track 8)
- Evan Patterson – guitar/vocals (all tracks), lyrics (tracks 1–5, 7, 9–11), shaker (track 1), acoustic guitar (track 9), jingle stick (track 8)
- Nick Theineman – bass/vocals (tracks 1–3, 5–11), lyrics (track 8)

=== Additional musicians ===
- Nate Newton (Converge, Old Man Gloom) – backing vocals (track 8)
- Ryan Patterson – lyrics (track 6)

=== Production ===
- Kurt Ballou – recording, mixing (January 2008)
- Carl Saff – mastering (April 2008)

=== Recording locations ===
- GodCity Recording Studio – full songs (tracks 1, 2, 4–7, 11), verse/chorus (track 8), bass/vocals/extra percussion (track 9), vocal and guitar over dubs (track 10)
- The Middle East – full songs (tracks 3, 10), intro only (track 8)
- The Subterranean – ending only (track 8), intro only (track 9)
- The Gagovcity Mansion – ending drums only (track 9)
- Death By Audio – crowd sample only (track 6), verse/chorus (track 9)

=== Artwork and design ===
- David Cook – skull art
- Evan Patterson – art direction, layout conception
- Ryan Patterson – layout
- Nick Theineman – photos
