= Sway (Whirr album) =

Studio album by Whirr
- Released: September 23, 2014
- Genre: Shoegaze
- Length: 35:56
- Label: Graveface
- Producer: Jack Shirley

Whirr chronology
Around (2013)	Sway (2014)	Whirr / Nothing (2014)

Sway is the second studio album by American shoegaze band Whirr, released on September 23, 2014 by Graveface Records. The album marked the departure of previous lead singer Alexandra Morte, as well as the first release with Devin Nunes who replaced Sergio Miranda on drums. It was produced by Jack Shirley.

== Release and reception ==
Professional ratings
Aggregate scores
Source	Rating
Metacritic	74/100
Review scores
Source	Rating
AllMusic	4/5 stars
Alternative Press	4/5 stars
Punknews.org	3.5/5 stars
Pitchfork	(6.9/10)
Consequence of Sound	B−

On July 11, 2014, the band released the song "Mumble" on SoundCloud as a preview of the new album.

At Metacritic, which assigns a normalized rating out of 100 to reviews from mainstream critics, Sway received an average score of 74, based on six reviews, which indicates "generally favorable reviews". Tim Sendra of AllMusic noted that Sway's sound had taken a large influence from Nick Bassett's presence, "inch[ing] them closer to the harder side of the shoegaze revival (right next to Bassett's other band, Nothing, in fact)". He gave the album 4 out of 5 stars and finalized his review by saying that "Sway is an album that would measure up to almost any album made by the first wave of shoegazers". Punknews.org gave the album 3.5 out of 5 stars; while generally praising the album, the reviewer wished that Whirr would "experiment even more and toy with new music to give a bit more insight as to where the road leads", and also noted that "some tracks are a tad too long and sometimes, it drags".

== Track listing ==
No.	Title	Length
1.	"Press"	3:31
2.	"Mumble"	2:34
3.	"Dry"	5:01
4.	"Clear"	6:10
5.	"Heavy"	4:14
6.	"Sway"	6:38
7.	"Lines"	4:24
8.	"Feel"	3:24
Total length:		35:56

== Personnel ==
Whirr

- Nick Bassett – guitar
- Joseph Bautista – guitar
- Devin Nunes – drums, percussion
- Loren Riviera – lead vocals, guitar
- Eddie Salgado – bass guitar

Other personnel

- Trevor Deschryver – drums (track 1)
- Ryan McCardle – design, layout
- Nickolas Schuller – design, layout
- Jack Shirley – production
- Will Yip – mixing
