= Whirr =

American shoegaze band

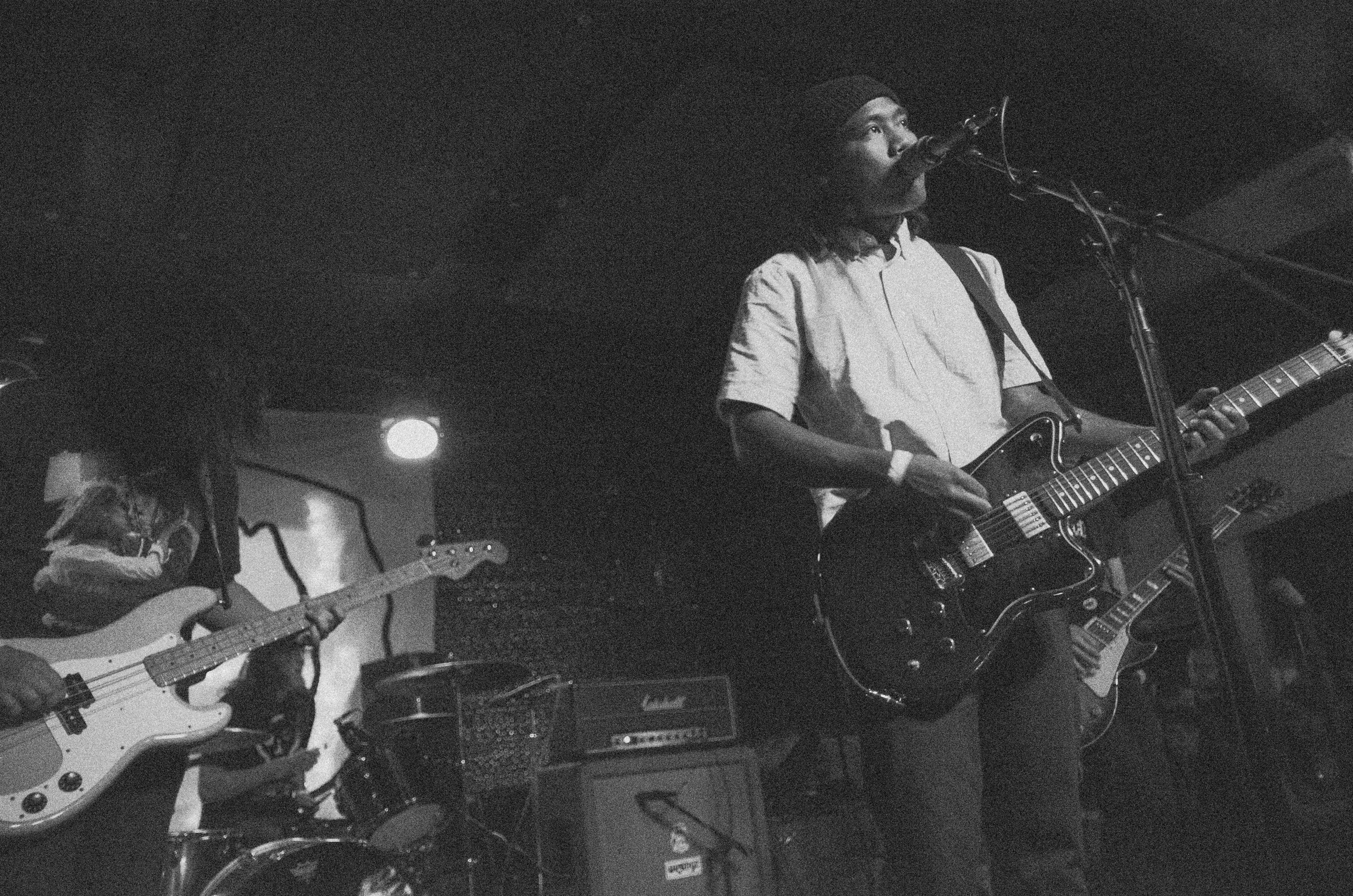
- Whirr in 2014

Background information
- Also known as: Whirl (2009–2011)
- Origin: Modesto, California, U.S.
- Genres: Shoegaze; dream pop; noise pop; slowcore
- Years active: 2009–2015, 2019–present
- Labels: Free Whirl; Graveface; Run for Cover; Tee Pee
- Spinoffs: Camera Shy; Fawning
- Members: Loren Rivera; Nick Bassett; Joseph Bautista; Eddie Salgado; Devin Nunes
- Past members: Kristina Esfandiari; Sergio Miranda; Alexandra Morte; Byanca Munoz
- Website: freewhirlrecords.com

Whirr (originally known as Whirl) is an American shoegaze band formed in Modesto, California, in October 2009. Since mid-2013, the band consists of vocalist-guitarist Loren Rivera, guitarists Nick Bassett and Joseph Bautista, bassist Eddie Salgado, and drummer Devin Nunes.

== History ==
Originally known as Whirl, the band had to legally change its name after a woman performing acoustic covers of Black Sabbath songs trademarked the name and threatened a lawsuit. Whirr's shoegaze sound is often compared to My Bloody Valentine and Slowdive. The band underwent numerous personnel changes before settling on their current lineup in 2013.

Whirr self-released a demo cassette and the EP Distressor before signing to Tee Pee Records in 2011. The band released June that year, followed by their 2012 debut album, Pipe Dreams. The latter was met with a generally positive reception from music critics. On October 16 of the same year, the band released a split with Anne on Run for Cover Records.

Whirr released the Around EP on July 9, 2013, and toured to support it that August with the band Nothing. As a result of touring together, members of Nothing and Whirr formed a side project called Death of Lovers, and Whirr and Nothing released a split EP. Bassett then joined Nothing on bass and toured with them. Bassett also started a new indie pop project with former Whirr vocalist Alexandra Morte called Camera Shy, while guitarist Joseph Bautista joined Best Coast as a touring member.

On September 23, 2014, Whirr released their second studio album, Sway, on Graveface Records.

On October 25, 2019, Time Well Recordings announced that Whirr would be releasing their third studio album, Feels Like You. Initially intended as a vinyl only release, the album was made available through the band's website as a limited pressing of 650 copies which sold out within the first day. Following this, the album was leaked online and the band opted to do an official digital release made available on Bandcamp.

On February 14, 2023, Whirr announced the release of a live album – titled Live In Los Angeles. Orders of the album came with two new songs recorded in January 2023 at Earth Analog Studios "Muta" and "Blue Sugar".

On December 25, 2024, Whirr released their fourth studio album, Raw Blue, on Bandcamp. Unlike their previous album, it was made available digitally on release.

In 2025, it was announced that the band would play the Slide Away festival, their first live shows since 2015. After this batch of shows, they announced a headline North American tour with Nothing.

On February 8 and February 9, 2026, Whirr, Nothing, and special guests, envy and Yuragi, would travel to Tokyo, Japan to play 2 live shows at UNIT and FEVER locations.

=== Social media use ===
Whirr became notorious for being inflammatory toward its own fans on social media, an action that the band described in a 2014 interview as "weeding out the pussies". After Pitchfork writer Ian Cohen gave Bassett's other band Nothing a mixed review, the band wrote on Facebook, "Ian Cohen is still a retarded pussy and pitchfork still don't know what they're talking about". A fan-created Tumblr page documented Whirr's instances of insulting its fans. When given an offer to apologize, Bassett refused and said that if Whirr alienated its entire fanbase, he would "be stoked that we didn't suck anyone's dick as a band and were just real dudes being real." On October 19, 2015, a series of derogatory remarks towards the transgender band G.L.O.S.S. were posted on Whirr's Twitter account, including one that read: "[G.L.O.S.S. is] just a bunch of boys running around in panties making shitty music". Bassett claimed they were posted by a "friend/merch guy" of the band. These tweets resulted in a backlash on social media; Graveface, who released the band's Sway, and Run for Cover Records, who released three of their EPs, severed ties with the band. In a 2024 interview, Nick Bassett expressed remorse over the band's past social media posts.

== Influences ==
Whirr have cited influences including Chapterhouse, My Bloody Valentine, Slowdive, Smashing Pumpkins, Dinosaur Jr., the Cure, Mojave 3, Strawberry Story, Cocteau Twins, Codeine and the Smiths.

== Band members ==
Current members

- Loren Rivera – guitars (2009–present), backing vocals (2009–2013), lead vocals (2013–present)
- Nick Bassett – guitars (2009–present)
- Joseph Bautista – guitars (2009–present)
- Eddie Salgado – bass (2009–present)
- Devin Nunes – drums (2013–present)

Former members

- Byanca Munoz – lead vocals, keyboards (2009–2011; session/touring 2025)
- Sergio Miranda – drums (2009–2013)
- Alexandra Morte – lead vocals, keyboards (2011–2012; session/touring 2025)
- Kristina Esfandiari – lead vocals (2012–2013)

Live / session musicians

- Brian Busch – percussion (2023–present), keyboards, backing vocals (2025–present)
- Inna Showalter – lead vocals (2012)
- Trevor Deschryver – drums (2013–2014)
- Kyle Kimball – drums (2014)

Timeline

== Discography ==
Studio albums

- Pipe Dreams (2012, Tee Pee)
- Sway (2014, Graveface)
- Feels Like You (2019, Free Whirl)
- Raw Blue (2024, Free Whirl)

Extended plays

- Distressor (2010, self-released)
- Part Time Punks Sessions (2012, Run for Cover)
- Around (2013, Graveface)
- Live in Los Angeles (2023, Free Whirl)

Demos

- Demo (2010, self-released)

Singles

- June (2011, Tee Pee)
- "Twist" / "Between Asleep And Awake" (2012, Run for Cover)
- "Muta" / "Blue Sugar" (2023, Free Whirl)
- "Speeding" / "Busy" (2024, Free Whirl)

Split releases

- Whirr / Anne (with Anne) (2012, Run for Cover)
- Whirr / Monster Movie (with Monster Movie) (2012, Graveface)
- Whirr / Nothing (with Nothing) (2014, Run for Cover)
- Whirr & Luster (with Luster) (2026, Free Whirl)

Compilation appearances

- "Pennyroyal Tea" (Nirvana cover) on In Utero, in Tribute, in Entirety (2014, Robotic Empire)
- "Color Change (Alternate)" on Mixed Singles Vol. 2 (2014, Run for Cover)
