= Whirr / Nothing =

EP (split) by Whirr and Nothing
- Released: November 17, 2014
- Genres: Shoegaze, alternative rock, noise rock
- Length: 16:49
- Label: Run for Cover
- Producer: Will Yip

Whirr chronology
Sway (2014)	Whirr / Nothing (2014)	Feels Like You (2019)

Nothing chronology
Guilty of Everything (2014)	Whirr / Nothing (2014)	Tired of Tomorrow (2016)

Whirr / Nothing is a split EP by the American shoegaze bands Whirr and Nothing, released on November 17, 2014, by Run for Cover. The EP was released digitally as well as in 12-inch vinyl format with an etched B-side packaged with a documentary DVD. Nothing announced the EP in February 2014, prior to the release of its debut album Guilty of Everything, describing the split release as "very accessible" and noting a tentative release date of early 2014.

Nothing released a music video for the track "Chloroform" on the date that the EP was released.

== Critical reception ==
Professional ratings
Review scores
Source	Rating
AllMusic	3.5/5 stars
Punknews.org	4/5 stars

AllMusic critic Tim Sendra wrote: "The EP is a nice little capper for a tremendous year and presents a strong case that Nothing and Whirr are the best noise-soaked, '90s-worshiping, pedal-hopping guitar bands around". Punknews.org stated that "both bands don't skip a beat here and it's four of their best", and further commented, "These bands continue in a musical vein that allows both to showcase how different they are to each other but also, just how these dissimilar sounds collide to make brutally honest and genuinely moving music".

== Reissue ==
For its 10th anniversary, the split was reissued in collaboration with The Funeral Party. The vinyl reissue features an updated layout and a 20 page booklet with never before seen photos by Alvin Carrillo. However, the reissue does not feature the documentary DVD or the B-Side etching.

== Track listing ==
1. "Ease" (Whirr) – 3:27
2. "Lean" (Whirr) – 5:01
3. "Chloroform" (Nothing) – 4:41
4. "July the Fourth" (Nothing) – 3:40
