= Alexis Marshall =

American singer (born 1980)

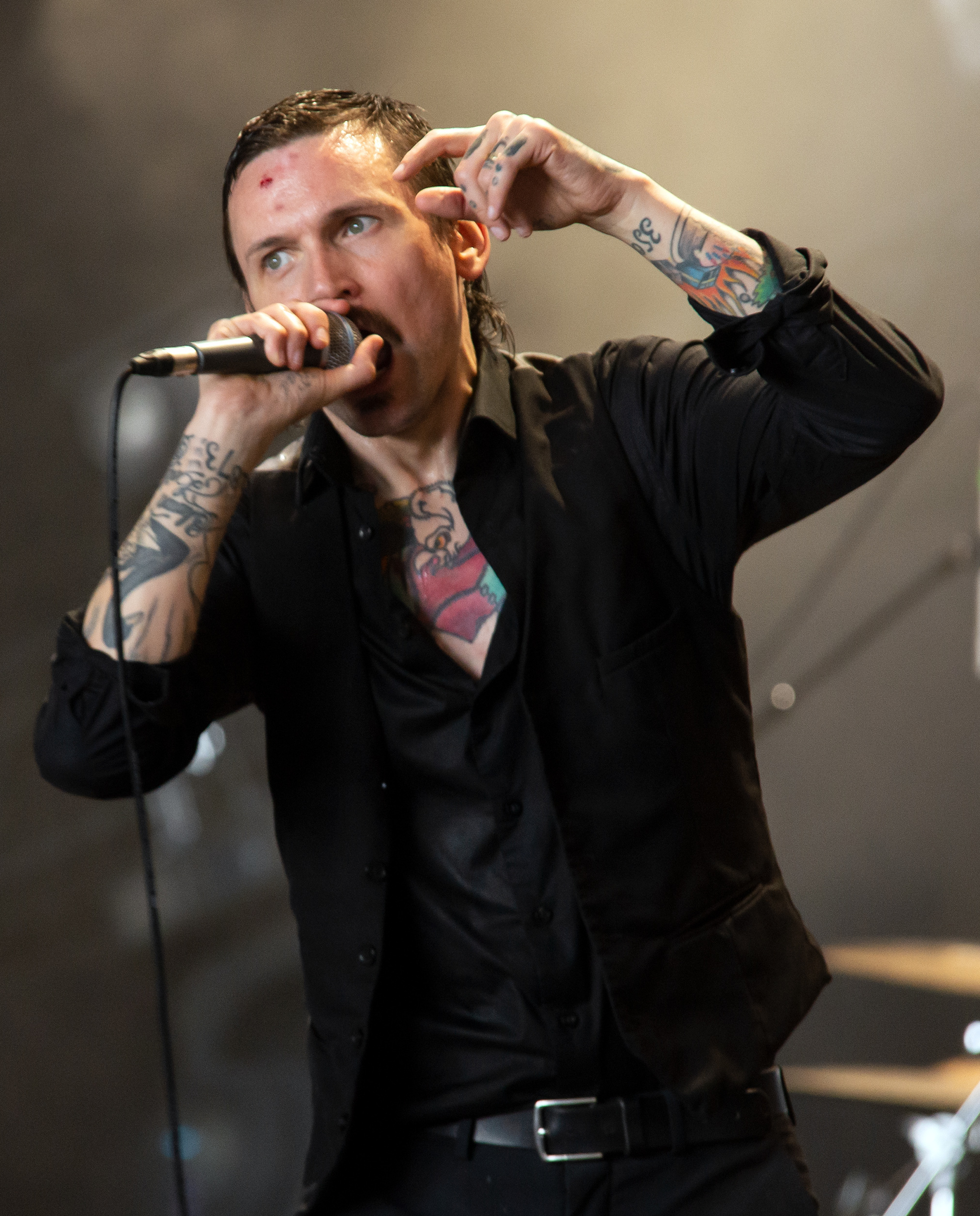
- Marshall performing in 2019

Background information
- Also known as: Lex Marshall
- Born: Alexis Stephen Francis Marshall; March 22, 1980 (age 46); Massachusetts, U.S.
- Origin: Providence, Rhode Island, U.S.
- Genres: Noise rock; industrial rock; no wave; experimental rock; hardcore punk; powerviolence; mathcore (early); grindcore (early)
- Occupations: Singer; songwriter
- Years active: 1997–present
- Member of: Daughters; Fucking Invincible
- Formerly of: As the Sun Sets
- Partners: Kristin Hayter (2019–2021)
- Children: 2

Alexis Stephen Francis Marshall (born March 22, 1980) is an American singer. He is the lead vocalist of the noise rock band Daughters and was formerly the frontman of the mathcore/grindcore band As the Sun Sets.

Marshall formed Daughters in 2002 following the disbandment of As the Sun Sets. Daughters disbanded in 2009 and reunited in 2013. Marshall released his debut solo album House of Lull. House of When on Sargent House in 2021.

== Life and career ==
Alexis "Lex" Marshall was born on March 22, 1980, in Massachusetts. He moved regularly before settling in Providence, Rhode Island, for college alongside other eccentric/experimental rock and metal music acts from the same city such as Lightning Bolt and The Body. In Providence, Marshall became adapted to and inspired by the local hardcore scene at an early age.

=== Daughters ===
Rhode Island mathcore/grindcore act As the Sun Sets were formed in 1998 with Marshall as the founding vocalist. After the band split up, Marshall formed Daughters with guitarist Nick Sadler and Samuel Walker in 2001. The band released their first EP in 2002. Their debut album, Canada Songs, was released in 2003, followed by Hell Songs in 2006.

In August 2009, several months after the band finished work on their self-titled album, Daughters, the band had what Marshall later described in an early 2010 interview as a "big falling out". Bassist Samuel Walker and guitarist Nick Sadler departed, resulting in Marshall and drummer Jon Syverson being the only members remaining in the band.

The band's hiatus meant that they did not tour to promote the album. Tensions between Sadler and Marshall contributed to the dissolution of the band, with Marshall feeling unhappy about the direction that Sadler wanted Daughters to take musically. In an interview Marshall explained, "Nick wrote a lot of the stuff on there, and he was really looking to make it accessible, and see how it fared... There are definitely parts of the record that were written to see how people will respond, which is kind of disappointing."

Marshall also cited his commitment to sobriety as playing a role; in an interview with Consequence, he said: "I assumed I wouldn't be able to mix music … 'cause, you know, there's so much fuckin' alcohol, drugs, and crazy people throwing shit at you."

After Andy Low organized a meeting between Marshall and bandmate Nick Sadler, Daughters reformed, performing their first post-hiatus gig in 2013. The band released "Satan in the Wait", their first new song in eight years, in July 2018. In November, they released a new album, You Won't Get What You Want, through Ipecac Recordings.

In 2012, Marshall formed Fucking Invincible with a current member of Dropdead and Soul Control. In the same year, he collaborated with the Assembly of Light choir in their self titled EP.

=== Solo work ===
In 2017, Marshall published his first poetry book, A Sea Above the Pains of Our Youth. He released another poetry collection in 2020 titled Moving Windows.

Marshall released his first solo single, "Nature in Three Movements", in 2020. The single was a standalone track and was not included on Marshall's solo album. In June 2021, Marshall released "Hounds in the Abyss", the debut single from his first solo album, House of Lull. House of When. The album was released on July 23, 2021. It was produced by Seth Manchester. Collaborators on the album included Marshall's then-partner Kristin Hayter as well as Daughters bandmate Jon Syverson. Pitchfork awarded the album a score of 7.2/10. Kerrang! gave the album a mixed review, writing that, "It's lacking the punchy impact you'd expect from Daughters, and there's nothing in the way of catchy hooks to reel listeners in."

== Artistry ==
In As the Sun Sets and early Daughters releases, his vocals were a mixture of high pitched screaming and death growls, but he has since abandoned both, as he uses a clean vocal style since Hell Songs. His clean vocals have been compared to those of Nick Cave and David Yow. Marshall is the chief vocalist and lyricist of Daughters. He has described himself as taking a narrative approach to song-writing. Daughters have been noted for their "confrontational live shows, where Marshall may endure "people spitting in my mouth, punching me, grabbing me, trying to pull my shirt off or whatever". He has cited Alice Cooper's early performances as an influence on his approach to live performances.

== Personal life ==
Marshall was originally from Providence, Rhode Island, but currently lives in Pennsylvania. He has two children. Marshall has spoken about his struggles with alcoholism.

During Daughters' early days, the band's live shows were infamous for Marshall's intense stage presence and behavior. Marshall, while routinely heavily intoxicated, would remove his clothing, drink his own urine, rub his penis on the microphone and make himself bleed. At a festival performance in Japan, Marshall vomited on the front row of the audience. In 2006, Marshall fled the stage in the middle of a concert at Los Angeles' Knitting Factory because the police arrived to arrest him for public indecency. He has admitted to "flossing" his buttocks with a microphone cable, inserting microphones into his anus and in Belgium, nearly starting a fight because he masturbated onto an object. Botch bassist Brian Cook recalled: "Women pulled at his briefs. Fans fondled and licked his exposed cock. A confessed 'sex addict', Lex would swap spit with both men and women mid-set and fuck fans in venue bathrooms." Marshall said this behavior was caused by both alcohol and his own boredom.

Marshall was in a relationship with musician Kristin Hayter from July 2019 to June 2021. In December 2021, Hayter accused Marshall of domestic abuse and rape throughout their relationship. Marshall denied the allegations, releasing a statement that said "Kristin is a person that I loved and cared deeply for, however, our relationship was unhealthy for both of us. I can assure anyone reading this that I absolutely did not abuse her, mentally or physically. I am investigating legal options." Sargent House, the record label which released Marshall's solo album in July 2021, soon revealed that it had privately terminated Marshall in August 2021 when Hayter first alerted the label of Marshall's alleged abuse, but waited to publicize their decision for Hayter's privacy.
