= Robotic Empire =

- Founded: 1999
- Founder: Mike Taylor, Andy Low
- Genre: Hardcore punk, heavy metal, post-rock, alternative rock
- Country of origin: U.S.
- Location: Richmond, Virginia
- Official website: www.roboticempire.com

Robotic Empire is an American independent record label based out of Richmond, Virginia, specializing in hardcore punk, heavy metal, and alternative rock. Some of the most popular bands signed to the label over the years have been pg.99, City of Caterpillar, Crowpath, The Red Chord, Circle Takes the Square, Cursive, Versoma, Daughters, Isis, Kayo Dot, Cave In, Red Sparowes, Torche and Hot Cross. Robotic Empire was known as Robodog Records for their first 14 releases.

In the 2010s, the label released a series of Nirvana tribute albums annually for Record Store Day: In Utero, in Tribute, in Entirety (2014), Whatever Nevermind (2015) and Doused in Mud, Soaked in Bleach (2016). They all featured prominent figures in the post-hardcore scene with all three including covers by Circa Survive, Thou and Young Widows, and also included prominent performances by These Arms Are Snakes, Jay Reatard, Daughters, Torche and The Fall of Troy.

The label also operates The Archivist, a digital-download label that reissues rare and out-of-print albums released between the late 1990s and the early 2000s.

== Roster ==
- The Abandoned Hearts Club
- A Days Refrain
- Agoraphobic Nosebleed
- Alien Crucifixion
- A Life Once Lost
- Battle of Mice
- Benumb
- Capsule
- Cave In
- The Catalyst
- Circle of Dead Children
- Circle Takes the Square
- Creation Is Crucifixion
- Crestfallen
- Crowpath
- Cursive
- Daughters
- Daybreak
- Dikfore
- Ed Gein
- Enkephalin
- Employer Employee
- Excitebike
- Floor
- Garuda
- The Ghastly City Sleep
- Gnob
- Gods And Queens
- Grails
- Gregor Samsa
- Hassan I Sabbah
- Hot Cross
- Hollow Sunshine
- House of Low Culture
- Isis
- Jesu
- Joshua Fit For Battle
- Kayo Dot
- Kungfu Rick
- Majority Rule
- Magrudergrind
- Malady
- Mannequin
- Matamoros
- The Minor Times
- Municipal Waste
- Neil Perry
- Nemo
- The Now
- Opeth
- pg.99
- Pig Destroyer
- Pilgrim Fetus
- Pink Razors
- Pygmy Lush
- Reactor No. 7
- The Red Chord
- Red Sparowes
- Riddle of Steel
- The Sacrifice Poles
- Sea of Thousand
- Shitstorm
- Stop It!!
- Superstitions of the Sky
- Torche
- Transistor Transistor
- Tyranny of Shaw
- The Ultimate Warriors
- Ultra Dolphins
- Vadim Taver (This Day Forward, Marigold)
- Verse En Coma
- Versoma
- Wadge
- Windmills By The Ocean
- Young Widows

=== The Archivist ===
- The Assistant
- City of Caterpillar
- Cloacal Kiss
- Employer, Employee
- Forcefedglass
- Forstella Ford
- Grief
- Harkonen
- Hassan I Sabbah
- Idolands
- Joshua Fit for Battle
- Lick Golden Sky
- Love Lost But Not Forgotten
- Majority Rule
- The Now
- Pushmen
- Ratking
- Reactor No.7
- Riddle of Steel
- Transistor Transistor
- The Ultimate Warriors
- Welcome the Plague Year
- Wraith

== See also ==
- List of record labels
