= Disinformation Fix =

Compilation album by Usurp Synapse
- Released: July 29, 2003
- Recorded: 1998–2001
- Genres: Emoviolence, grindcore, noise rock
- Length: 1:33:16
- Label: Alone
- Producer: Mike Dixon

Usurp Synapse chronology
| Disinformation Fix (2003) | A Vile Contanima (2008) |

Professional ratings
Review scores
| Source | Rating |
|---|---|
| AllMusic | 2/5 stars |
| Ink19 | Favorable |
| Punknews.org | 4/5 stars |

Disinformation Fix is the discography compilation album by Usurp Synapse, which was released as a double disc compact disc through the New York label Alone Records on July 29, 2003. The album collects every single recording made by the group during their initial run, including previously unreleased tracks.

== Background ==
Usurp Synapse formed in 1998 in Lafayette, Indiana by guitarists Brandon Harris and Dean Duval, bassist Dustin Redington, vocalist John Scott and Travis Chance. Both Duval and Redington would leave the group that following year, being replaced by guitarist Don Kirkland and bassist Tony Dryer, respectively. That same year, vocalist Antonio Leiriao joined the group. Leoriao previously lived in New York before he moved out to Indiana to join the band. The group's discography mostly consists of split extended plays, and the group has done splits with bands such as Hassan I Sabbah, Neil Perry, Index For Potential Suicide, Jeromes Dream, among others. The band went through with a single nationwide tour with Jeromes Dream and Racebannon during the summer of 2000 before they began production on what was supposed to be their first full-length album, ATM Diatribe. Production for ATM Diatribe began in early 2001. Around that same time, the group added keyboardist Mike Dixon to their line-up. By May 2001, however, the group broke-up, partially due to financial conflicts, leaving the album unfinished with the exception of six recorded songs. These six tracks, along with other unreleased recordings as well as the rest of the band's discography, would later be released as a two-disc compilation album by Alone Records in 2003 titled Disinformation Fix.

== Track listing ==
Disc 1
| No. | Title | Taken from | Length |
|---|---|---|---|
| 1. | "Mexidudes" | ATM Diatribe (Previously unreleased) | 3:40 |
| 2. | "Beard of Remoras" | ATM Diatribe (Previously unreleased) | 2:10 |
| 3. | "Modulator/Demodulator" | ATM Diatribe (Previously unreleased) | 2:26 |
| 4. | "Misc. Arrangement of Black Market Parts" | ATM Diatribe (Previously unreleased) | 1:44 |
| 5. | "Muscle of the Wolf" | ATM Diatribe (Previously unreleased) | 1:50 |
| 6. | "Pathogen Gimmick" | ATM Diatribe (Previously unreleased) | 3:50 |
| 7. | "Giga Please!" | Split with Mara'kate (Previously unreleased) | 1:14 |
| 8. | "Take Advantage of the Headlock" | Split with Mara'kate (Previously unreleased) | 1:35 |
| 9. | "Brundlefly" | Songs of the Dead 2: Idle Hands (Compilation appearance) | 1:27 |
| 10. | "3 Clicks" | Blood Money (Compilation appearance) | 0:52 |
| 11. | "Good Luck With Your Book" | Antipodes (Compilation appearance) | 0:58 |
| 12. | "Making Room For The Worthwhile" | Just Do It! (split with Hassan I Sabbah) | 0:59 |
| 13. | "Wrist, Meet Razor" | Just Do It! (split with Hassan I Sabbah) | 1:02 |
| 14. | "Maybe You Should Kill Yourself" | Just Do It! (split with Hassan I Sabbah) | 1:03 |
| 15. | "You Thought You Were Special, You Were Wrong" | Just Do It! (split with Hassan I Sabbah) | 1:56 |
| 16. | "Untitled 1" | An Aspirin, An X-Ray (split with Jeromes Dream) | 0:50 |
| 17. | "Untitled 2" | An Aspirin, An X-Ray (split with Jeromes Dream) | 0:27 |
| 18. | "Untitled 3" | An Aspirin, An X-Ray (split with Jeromes Dream) | 1:50 |
| 19. | "Untitled 4" | An Aspirin, An X-Ray (split with Jeromes Dream) | 1:46 |
| 20. | "I'm A FuFuFucking VaVaVampire" | Split with Index For Potential Suicide | 1:04 |
| 21. | "What Would You Say If I Said I Love You?" | Split with Index For Potential Suicide | 0:59 |
| 22. | "I Was Born With A Hard On" | Split with Index For Potential Suicide | 0:39 |
| 23. | "Upyena" | Split with Index For Potential Suicide | 0:54 |
| 24. | "The Main Ingredient" | The Main Ingredient | 5:48 |
| 25. | "Come And Get It Mole" | The Chilling Tale of Usurp Synapse, As Told By Neil Perry (split with Neil Perry) | 1:07 |
| 26. | "Doin' the Backwards" | The Chilling Tale of Usurp Synapse, As Told By Neil Perry (split with Neil Perry) | 0:44 |
| 27. | "We Shoot from the Hip" | The Chilling Tale of Usurp Synapse, As Told By Neil Perry (split with Neil Perry) | 0:53 |
| 28. | "Live It! Live It!" | The Chilling Tale of Usurp Synapse, As Told By Neil Perry (split with Neil Perry) | 0:31 |
| 29. | "Here's $100 Senorita" | The Chilling Tale of Usurp Synapse, As Told By Neil Perry (split with Neil Perry) | 0:33 |
| 30. | "Keith Sweat" | The Chilling Tale of Usurp Synapse, As Told By Neil Perry (split with Neil Perry) | 1:15 |
| 31. | "Murder Was the Case They Gave Me" | Split with Rep Seki | 0:27 |
| 32. | "Born Different" | Split with Rep Seki | 1:35 |
| Total length: | | | 48:45 |

Disc 2
| No. | Title | Artist(s) | Length |
|---|---|---|---|
| 1. | "I Know A Guy Who Likes Dynamite" | In Examination of | 1:04 |
| 2. | "Going Down With Both Guns Blazin'" | In Examination of | 1:29 |
| 3. | "Truth About Pyecraft" | In Examination of | 1:36 |
| 4. | "Talk To Tucker" | In Examination of | 1:35 |
| 5. | "Robot Insurance" | In Examination of | 1:36 |
| 6. | "Meryl Streep Is A Fucking Liar" | This Endless Breath | 1:02 |
| 7. | "Pete Rose's Homerun Derby" | This Endless Breath | 1:46 |
| 8. | "When Good Pets Go Bad" | This Endless Breath | 1:45 |
| 9. | "Lil' Guys" | This Endless Breath | 0:32 |
| 10. | "Hairdo 2000 AD" | This Endless Breath | 0:53 |
| 11. | "Oh... You Are Sick" | This Endless Breath | 1:37 |
| 12. | "Bloody Hardhat" | This Endless Breath | 1:32 |
| 13. | "Don't Be Cruel" | This Endless Breath | 2:35 |
| 14. | "Fuck You Mankind" | Previously unreleased | 1:22 |
| 15. | "Rottweiler Death" | Previously unreleased | 1:10 |
| 16. | "This City's A Grid" | Previously unreleased | 1:30 |
| 17. | "Reach Out and Touch Me With That Emo Hand" | Previously unreleased | 1:17 |
| 18. | "A Circle of Thank Yous" | Index of Isolation (split with Emotion Zero) | 0:55 |
| 19. | "Carebear Stare" | Index of Isolation (split with Emotion Zero) | 1:23 |
| 20. | "My Spidey Sense Is Going Fucking Nuts" | Index of Isolation (split with Emotion Zero) | 1:41 |
| 21. | "Robocop As A Fragrance" | Index of Isolation (split with Emotion Zero) | 1:38 |
| 22. | "Segueway Into Dryhumping" | Previously unreleased | 0:55 |
| 23. | "Infestation of Richard Pryor" | Previously unreleased | 1:11 |
| 24. | "Art Carney Wannabe Motherfucker" | Previously unreleased | 2:46 |
| 25. | "Deadly Handshake, Friendly Milkshake" | Previously unreleased | 1:35 |
| 26. | "Energy Condom" | Previously unreleased | 1:26 |
| 27. | "Carving A Ferrari Out of A Pumpkin" | Previously unreleased | 0:52 |
| 28. | "Extra Guys Screaming" | Previously unreleased | 2:17 |
| 29. | "..." | Previously unreleased | 1:03 |
| Total length: | | | Disc 2 41:27; Total 93:16 |

Notes

- The official track listing according to the liner notes are wrong. For example, disc 2, track 6 is labeled as "Fuck You Mankind", while the track itself is actually "Meryl Streep Is A Fucking Liar". The track list above is the corrected track list.
- Although disc 2, tracks 15 through 17 are previously unreleased, the liner notes say that they are from This Endless Breath, when really This Endless Breath did not include them. This suggests that they were recorded during the same sessions as the album. The same applies to disc 2, tracks 22 to 29, where the liner notes state that they were from the band's Index of Isolation split with Emotion Zero.

== Personnel ==
- Brandon Harris – guitar
- Dean Duval – guitar
- Don Kirkland – guitar
- Dustin Redington – bass
- John Scott – vocals, keyboards
- Mike Dixon – keyboards, recording
- Tony Dryer – bass
- Travis Chance – drums
- Antonio Leiriao – vocals
- Brian Wyrick – design
