= The Dream Is Dead =

American hardcore punk band

- Origin: Indianapolis, Indiana
- Genres: Hardcore punk, metalcore
- Years active: 2000–2011
- Labels: Relapse, Escape Artist, Happy Couples Never Last, Melting Wing, What Else?

The Dream Is Dead was an American hardcore punk band based in Indianapolis whose music contained many anti-authoritarian themes.

== Band history ==
The concept behind The Dream Is Dead began in 2000 when Clark Giles (founder of Happy Couples Never Last Records) and long-time friend Jason McCash (bass player for the seminal Circle City hardcore band Burn It Down) kicked around the idea of doing a project band dedicated to putting the threat and politics back into hardcore. A feeling of youthful rebellion and resistance to the status quo initially drew them to hardcore punk in their teenage years, and it was the integrity of the music that sustained their love for the genre.

Initial attempts to get the band off the ground failed but the breakup of Burn It Down left McCash without a band and revitalized The Dream Is Dead's prospects. Jared Southwick (from Indiana death metal band Harakiri) was recruited for guitar duties, eventually parting from his former band to devote his time fully to The Dream Is Dead. Alex Bond, fresh from the breakup of his screamo band The Sutek Conspiracy, completed the lineup on drums in September 2001.

Alex Bond left the band late in the Spring of 2002 and was replaced by local drummer Dustin Boltjes. By August, Boltjes was acclimated, and the band resumed a heavy regimen of touring.

The toll of being on the road and family responsibilities led founding member McCash to bow out in the fall of 2003. Beaten but not broken, the band resurfaced in early 2004 with former Ice Nine guitarist Dave Lawson on bass.

The bulk of 2004 was spent writing the band's first album, once again for Escape Artist. A short tour with fellow hoosiers Phoenix Bodies in late 2004 allowed them to polish the new material. In the meantime, in-demand Los Angeles producer and current Theory of Ruin guitarist Alex Newport (formerly of Fudge Tunnel and Nailbomb) was recruited to handle recording and production duties for the album. Having recorded several current indie staples for the likes of the Melvins, the Locust, Mars Volta, and others, the band and the label felt he was the man for the job.

A short tour brought The Dream Is Dead to the west coast in March 2005, where they recorded their debut album, Hail The New Pawn. In June 2007, the band announced it would be releasing a split 7-inch on Relapse Records with The Gates of Slumber.

== Members ==
- Clark Giles – vocals
- Dustin Boltjes – drums
- Dave Lawson – bass

=== Former members ===
- Jared Southwick – guitar (deceased)
- Jason McCash – guitar (deceased; formerly of Burn It Down and The Gates of Slumber)
- Alex Bond – drums (now in Horsewhip)

On June 23, 2011, band member and guitarist Jared Southwick, 34, died at a Muncie, Indiana hospital, from complications from a hepatic and renal condition he had been hospitalized for earlier that month; he suffered complications of the illness and his condition deteriorated.

Bass player Jason McCash died from a heroin overdose on April 5, 2014.

== Discography ==
- Letter of Resignation EP (2001, What Else? Records)
- Taking Friendly Fire EP (2002, Escape Artist Records)
- Revolution Summer split 7-inch with Find Him and Kill Him (2002, Happy Couples Never Last)
- Split 7-inch w/Phoenix Bodies (2004, Melting Wing Records)
- Hail the New Pawn (2005, Escape Artist Records)- pressed on cd and limited edition blood-splattered clear vinyl.
- Self-titled split 7-inch with The Gates of Slumber (2007, Relapse Records)

=== Videography ===
- Decade of Destruction DVD (2004, XYZ Entertainment)- skate video with Unsane, Eyehategod, Lamb of God, Slayer, etc.
- Pinnernation DVD (2007, XYZ Entertainment)

== Related bands ==
- Burn It Down
- Demiricous
- The Gates of Slumber
