= Jeromes Dream =

American screamo band

- Origin: West Haven, Connecticut, United States
- Genres: Screamo; emoviolence; powerviolence; grindcore; noise rock; math rock
- Years active: 1997–2001, 2018–present
- Labels: Iodine Recordings, Witching Hour, Old Glory Records, Clean Plate Records, Alone Records
- Members: Jeff Smith; Erik Ratensperger; Sean Leary
- Past members: Nick Antonopoulos
- Website: www.jeromesdreamforever.com

Jeromes Dream is a screamo band formed in West Haven, Connecticut and currently based in San Francisco, California, originally active from 1997 to 2001, and again from 2018 onwards.

== History ==
Jeromes Dream formed on September 13, 1997 after a short jam session that was held in the basement of guitarist Nick Antonopoulos in his mother's house with bassist Jeff Smith and drummer Erik Ratensperger. According to Ratensperger, their first recorded material was intended to be used for a demo release; however, it caught the attention of Rice Control Records, resulting in the intended demo material being released as a split album with Amalgamation.

Most of the band's music was released as splits with other artists, including other notable screamo acts such as Usurp Synapse. Their most well known split release would be their split with Orchid, a 10" record shaped in a 3/4ths view of a skull, which is sought after by both collectors and fans alike, and considered a definitive work of the genre. They toured the United States frequently, and their first proper full-length album, titled Seeing Means More Than Safety, was released in May 2000.

Their second full-length, Presents, which was released on July 9, 2001, featured a significant change in sound for the band. They eventually broke up in August that same year. Jeff Smith began a career in experimental drone music by creating the band The Wind-Up Bird with Joseph Grimm, while Erik Ratensperger became the drummer for The Virgins, a dance punk band from New York.

Along with artists such as Orchid, Saetia and Pg. 99, they are considered as one of the most influential bands of the late 1990s screamo movement and have been called as "probably the most original" band of their time. Their music has influenced many bands, such as Lord Snow, Brighter Arrows, and Vein.

In mid-2016, Ratensperger posted a previously unreleased video on the new official Jeromes Dream YouTube channel. He also opened an official archival band Instagram page, mostly for the purpose of uploading previously unreleased photos of the group. In the spring of 2017, it was announced that Zegema Beach Records and Coniine Records would release a Jeromes Dream tribute compilation, titled It's More Like A Homage To You, with all proceeds going to Flint, Michigan. The compilation featured covers done by 29 bands from multiple countries.

On September 3, 2017, it was announced through Jeromes Dream's official Instagram account that all three members of the band had talked that day through a three-hour phone call for the first time since their disbandment, two hours of which were recorded by drummer Erik Ratensperger, and later posted on the band's YouTube channel in two separate parts.

== Reunion ==
On March 5, 2018, Jeromes Dream created a new website, jeromesdreamforever.com, featuring a mailing list. On March 8, the band posted a YouTube video, titled "Something is happening.", which linked to their website.

On March 22, 2018, Jeromes Dream announced that they were writing a new full-length album, which was set to be recorded in the fall of 2018 by Kurt Ballou at GodCity Studios. This record would be self-released, and to finance this the band set up an Indiegogo crowdfunding campaign as a pre-order for the record. In less than 24 hours, 90% of their $15,000 goal was reached, and in less than 4 days, 100% of the goal was reached.

The LP was confirmed to no longer be recorded by Kurt Ballou, but instead by Jack Shirley, at Atomic Garden studios. It was released on July 19, 2019. Later in January 2019, it was announced that the reformed group would tour with Loma Prieta in the summer of that year.

On July 30, 2021, Jeromes Dream announced that they were working with the Boston-based label Iodine Recordings and reissuing their album "Presents" on vinyl for its 20th anniversary.

On October 3, 2021, Jeromes Dream announced via social media that Sean Leary (Loma Prieta, Ełłe, Stormlight) had officially joined the band as a second guitarist.

On February 28, 2023, the band announced a new album, titled "The Gray In Between," and released the single "Stretched Invisible from London." The album released on May 5 of the same year.

== Style and live performances ==
Vocalist and bassist Jeff Smith would scream from the top of his lungs during live performances without the use of a microphone. During live shows, both Smith and Antonopoulos would perform with their backs facing the audience. They always performed on the floor, and would refuse to play on stage.

Jeromes Dream is mainly categorized as a screamo band. Their music includes influences from powerviolence, grindcore, noise rock, and math rock. Drummer Erik Ratensperger has cited Don Caballero, 1.6 Band, Bloodlet, and Deadguy as influences on Jerome's Dream. Additionally, Ratensperger has stated that they admired such bands as Four Hundred Years, Paul Newman, Reversal of Man, Portraits of Past, Swing Kids, Shotmaker, Piebald, Converge, Orchid, OXES, Roadside Monument, Trans Am, Boys Life, Mineral, Rye Coalition, Rorschach, Coalesce, Torches To Rome, Chavez, Botch, Tristeza, Oneida, Braid, and among others, describing them as "bands [who] were doing incredible things, making incredible music that truly meant something."

Their first full length, Seeing Means More Than Safety, was very violent and destructive musically, and included many noise interludes composed of guitar feedback and radio samples. Their second full length, Presents, however, was much more angular musically. The vocal style also changed dramatically, having "a more traditional hardcore-shout kind of approach," as described in a review.

== Band members ==
Current members

- Jeff Smith – bass, vocals (1997–2001, 2018–present)
- Erik Ratensperger – drums (1997–2001, 2018–present)
- Sean Leary – guitars (2021–present)

Former members

- Nick Antonopoulos – guitars (1997–2001, 2018–2021)

== Discography ==
=== Studio albums ===
Year	Album Details	Notes
2000	Seeing Means More Than Safety: Released: May 2000; Label: Old Glory Records Clean Plate Records; Format: 10"	First pressing consisted of 1000 black colored copies. Second press consisted of 600 black copies and 400 white copies. First press was released through Old Glory, second press was released through Clean Plate.
2001	Presents: Released: June 9, 2001; Label: Alone Records; Format: CD, LP, CS	Remastered by Jack Shirley at The Atomic Garden with new artwork, released on July 30, 2021.
2019	LP: Released: July 19, 2019; Label: Microspy; Formats: CD, LP, CS, DL	First studio album release in 18 years.
2023	The Gray In Between: Released: May 5, 2023; Label: Microspy/Iodine Recordings; Format: LP, CS	

=== Split releases ===
Year	Album Details	Notes
1998	Amalgamation/Jeromes Dream: Released: December 1998; Label: Rice Control Records; Format: 7"	About three pressings made. The first press consisted of 200 black copies and 100 pink, and its cover was blue/white cardboard. The second press consisted of 300 blue copies, and was packaged in a manilla envelope. A third pressing was made, 100 black copies that came in a blank white cover with a letter written by the two band glued to it. Split with Amalgamation.
1999	Jerome's Dream/July: Released: Spring 1999; Label: Hit The Ground Running; Format: 7"	Consisted of 500 black copies, 250 with green colored covers, 250 with brown colored covers. Split with July. Jeromes Dream is mistakenly credited as Jerome's Dream.
1999	Jerome's Dream/The Book Of Dead Names: Released: September 1999; Label: Witching Hour Records; Format: 5"	853 copies made, 750 black, 112 red. Jeromes Dream is mistakenly credited as Jerome's Dream. Split with The Book Of Dead Names.
2000	Jeromes Dream/Orchid: Released: May 2000; Label: Witching Hour Records; Format: 10"	Single-sided 10" record that's shaped as a skull. The back side of the record had two grooves, one that contained Jeromes Dream's tracks, and one that contained Orchid's tracks. 1000 copies were pressed with black ink, 1000 copies were pressed with glow-in-the-dark ink, and 197 were pressed with red ink. According to the insert, the red pressing was an accident. Split with Orchid.
2000	An Aspirin, An X-Ray: Released: August 2000; Label: Clean Plate Records/Level Plane Records; Format: 7"	1300 white copies, 200 black. Some came with tour pins. Split with Usurp Synapse.
2000	Jeromes Dream/The One AM Radio: Released: December 2000; Label: Garbage Czar; Format: 7"	2000 black copies pressed. Split with The One AM Radio

=== Compilation albums ===
Year	Album Details	Notes
2005	Completed: 1997-2001: Released: 2005; Label: Alone Records; Format: 2xCD	Discography compilation that includes every single song Jeromes Dream recorded throughout their lifespan, included live recordings and previously unreleased material

=== Compilation appearances ===
Year	Album Details	Song
2000	Antipodes: Released: October 2000; Label: Level Plane Records; Format: 7"	"How Staggering Is This Realization?"
2001	Ghost in the Gears: Released: January 2001; Label: Iodine Recordings; Format: CD	"Everyday at 3:06"
2023	Balladeers, Reedefined: Released: June 2023; Label: Secret Voice; Format: 12"	"Reminders to Parallel"
