= A Retrospective (Saetia album) =

Compilation album by Saetia
- Released: October 1, 2001
- Recorded: April 1997 – Spring 1999
- Genre: Screamo
- Length: 72:34
- Label: Level Plane

Saetia chronology
Eronel (1999)	A Retrospective (2001)	Live At ABC No Rio, Spring 1999 (2016)

Professional ratings
Review scores
Source	Rating
Allmusic	4.5/5 stars
Collective Zine	favorable
Delusions of Adequacy	favorable
Exclaim!	favorable

A Retrospective is a compilation album composed of the entire recorded output of screamo band Saetia, released October 1, 2001 by Level Plane. The album, which also includes five live recordings taken from one of the last shows the band performed at ABC No Rio, was remastered entirely by Alan Douches.

== Track listing ==
No.	Title	Taken from	Length
1.	"Notres Langues Nous Trompent"	Saetia	2:37
2.	"The Sweetness and the Light"	Saetia	2:47
3.	"An Open Letter"	Saetia	2:28
4.	"Woodwell"	Saetia	2:20
5.	"Corporeal"	Saetia	4:19
6.	"Ariadne's Thread"	Saetia	2:41
7.	"From the Firmament"	Saetia	2:19
8.	"Postlapsaria"	Saetia	4:48
9.	"Endymion"	Saetia	4:19
10.	"Roquentin"	Eronel	2:53
11.	"The Poet You Never Were"	Eronel	3:43
12.	"Some Natures Catch No Plagues"	Eronel	4:16
13.	"The Burden of Reflecting"	Demo	2:38
14.	"Closed Hands"	Demo	3:51
15.	"Venus and Bacchus"	Demo	3:19
16.	"One Dying Wish"	Demo	4:42
17.	"Becoming the Truth"	ABC No Rio Benefit (compilation appearance)	2:38
18.	"The Poet You Never Were" (live)	ABC No Rio, Spring 1999	3:48
19.	"Ariadne's Thread" (live)	ABC No Rio, Spring 1999	2:29
20.	"Notres Langues Nous Trompent" (live)	ABC No Rio, Spring 1999	2:41
21.	"The Sweetness and the Light" (live)	ABC No Rio, Spring 1999	2:48
22.	"Endymion" (live)	ABC No Rio, Spring 1999	4:09

== Personnel ==
- Billy Werner - vocals
- Jamie Behar - guitar
- Adam Marino - guitar (tracks 1–9, 13–17)
- Colin Bartoldus - bass (tracks 1–9), guitar (tracks 10–12)
- Alex Madara - bass (tracks 13–17)
- Steve Roche - bass (tracks 10–12)
- Greg Drudy - drums
- Adam Schwartz - photography
