= Cryonics (album) =

Studio album by Hot Cross
- Released: May 20, 2003
- Recorded: South River, New Jersey
- Genres: Post-hardcore; hardcore punk; screamo
- Length: 32:50
- Label: Level Plane
- Producers: Hot Cross, and Eric Kovortek

Hot Cross chronology
A New Set of Lungs (2001)	Cryonics (2003)	Hot Cross/Light the Fuse and Run Split EP (2003)

Professional ratings
Review scores
Source	Rating
AllMusic	3/5 stars
Punknews.org	4/5 stars
Sputnikmusic	5/5 stars
Stylus	(F)

Cryonics is the first album released by the band Hot Cross on Level Plane, featuring a total of ten tracks. It was their first full-length album and follows their 2001 debut EP A New Set of Lungs.

== Track listing ==
1. "Fortune Teller" – 3:26
2. "A Weekend Spent Askance" – 2:09
3. "Pretty Picture of a Broken Face" – 3:11
4. "A Tale for the Ages" – 4:11
5. "Dissertation: 14" – 3:32
6. "In Memory of Morvern" – 3:02
7. "Patience and Prudence" – 2:56
8. "Frozen by Tragedy" – 2:44
9. "Figure Eight" – 3:17
10. "Requiescat" – 4:20
