= A Day in Black and White =

A Day in Black and White may refer to:

- A Day in Black and White (band), American band
- A Day in Black and White (film), American film
