= Completed: 1997–2001 =

Compilation album by Jeromes Dream
- Released: January 25, 2005
- Recorded: 1997 – April 2001
- Genre: Screamo, emoviolence, noise rock, math rock
- Length: 1:26:23
- Label: Alone Records
- Producer: Kurt Ballou, Johnathan P. Herbert, Will Killingworth

Jeromes Dream chronology
Presents (2001)	Completed: 1997–2001 (2005)	LP (2019)

Professional ratings
Review scores
Source	Rating
Sputnikmusic	4.5/5 stars

Completed: 1997–2001 is a compilation album released in 2005 by American screamo band Jeromes Dream on Alone Records. The album consists of the band's entire recorded history up to that point, including previously unreleased material.

== Track listing ==
Disc 1
No.	Title	Taken from	Length
1.	"This Is for Baby Fat"	Presents	0:47
2.	"What Other Adjective Would You Have Me Use for the Word Good?"	Presents	0:51
3.	"Do We Write to Write Right?"	Presents	1:03
4.	"True Thinkers Will Stop Time to Think"	Presents	0:40
5.	"Who's the Sniffer Lifter?"	Presents	1:44
6.	"Rock Song"	Presents	1:19
7.	"His Life Is My Denim Paradise All Day, Every Day"	Presents	1:29
8.	"Double Who? Double You!"	Presents	2:29
9.	"A Second Grade Art Project"	Seeing Means More Than Safety	2:11
10.	"And Just Like That the Year Is Gone"	Seeing Means More Than Safety	1:16
11.	"Exit 29 Collapsed as I Drove By"	Seeing Means More Than Safety	1:04
12.	"The Monologue of the Century"	Seeing Means More Than Safety	1:46
13.	"Life Is What You Make of It"	Seeing Means More Than Safety	1:39
14.	"The Teacher Says to His Pupil"	Seeing Means More Than Safety	0:59
15.	"Just Down the Hall From Room 526"	Seeing Means More Than Safety	0:52
16.	"They're Always so Quick to Judge"	Seeing Means More Than Safety	1:02
17.	"Its More Like a Message to You"	Seeing Means More Than Safety	3:40
18.	"A Present for Those Who Are Present"	Seeing Means More Than Safety	1:54
19.	"It's Right Where You Said It Would Be"	split 10-inch with Orchid	0:49
20.	"I'm Reminded of a Kid Who Used to Stomp Bugs"	split 10-inch with Orchid	1:12
21.	"A Well Documented Case of Severe Autism"	split 10-inch with Orchid	1:30
22.	"My Most Recent Left Right Brain Argument"	split 10-inch with Orchid	2:27
23.	"Untitled Number Two"	split 7-inch with The One AM Radio	3:59

Disc 2
No.	Title	Taken from	Length
1.	"Remember the Sea of Tranquility"	An Aspirin, An X-Ray split 7-inch with Usurp Synapse	1:35
2.	"Taking Care of Terrific"	An Aspirin, An X-Ray split 7-inch with Usurp Synapse	1:19
3.	"What I Learned at This Years Regional Optometry Convention"	An Aspirin, An X-Ray split 7-inch with Usurp Synapse	2:14
4.	"Unreleased No. 1"	previously unreleased	1:18
5.	"The Big Fuck You"	split 5-inch with The Book of Dead Names	0:47
6.	"I Won't Stop Wondering Until You Stop Breathing"	split 5-inch with The Book of Dead Names	1:12
7.	"Thirty Dollar Bill"	split 7-inch with July	3:49
8.	"Everyday at 3:06"	split 7-inch with Amalgamation	2:23
9.	"The Last Time We Talked"	split 7-inch with Amalgamation	2:15
10.	"Live Song No. 1"	previously unreleased	2:20
11.	"Live Song No. 2"	previously unreleased	1:32
12.	"How Staggering Is This Realization"	Antipodes (compilation appearance)	1:00
13.	"Unreleased No. 2"	previously unreleased	1:21
14.	"Unreleased No. 3"	previously unreleased	3:04
15.	"Unreleased No. 4"	previously unreleased	1:25
16.	"Unreleased No. 5"	previously unreleased	1:27
17.	"Unreleased No. 6"	previously unreleased	2:25
18.	"No Matter What You're Always There"	demo tape 1998	2:03
19.	"35"	Presents	16:22

== Personnel ==
Jeromes Dream

- Jeff Smith – vocals, bass
- Nick Antonopoulos – guitar
- Eric Ratensperger – drums

Production

- Johnathan P. Herbert – recording (Seeing Means More Than Safety)
- Kurt Ballou – recording, production (Seeing Means More Than Safety, Presents)
- Will Killingsworth – recording (Split 5" with The Book of Dead Names)
