= Birdskulls =

- Origin: Brighton, East Sussex, UK
- Genres: Soft grunge; grunge; emo; slacker rock (early)
- Years active: 2012–2018
- Label: Art Is Hard
- Past members: Jack Pulman; Rory Marshall; Nick Hoyes; Luke Ellis; Nick Wells; Sam Hrachovec

Birdskulls were an English rock band from Brighton. Formed in 2012 as a solo-project by vocalist/guitarist Jack Pulman, the band quickly expanded into a three piece that included bassist Rory Marshall and various drummers. In 2014, they released a split EP with Bloody Knees, followed by their debut album Trickle in 2015. Birdskulls' fusion of emo and grunge led them to become a forefront band in the British DIY music scene of the 2010s, helping to establish the Brighton soft grunge scene and progress the ongoing grunge revival. They released their self-titled EP in 2018, and disbanded soon after.

== History ==
Birdskulls originated in 2012, when Jack Pulman began to record music at home on his laptop. Quickly, he hired additional musicians from his local Brighton music scene. The first lineup of Birdskulls was Pulman on guitar and vocals, Rory Marshall on bass and New Years Evil drummer Nick Hoyes. When Hoyes departed, his role was filled by Muncie Girls drummer Luke Ellis. Following Ellis' departure, the band hired the New Tusk drummer Nick Wells. On 19 November 2012, they released the single "Mispresume", premiered through Neu. They announced the single would be a part of their upcoming EP Mispresume/Rolling Tongue, released by Art Is Hard Records on 17 December. On 24 February 2014, they released a split EP with Bloody Knees. Around this time, Wells departed from the band. His role was filled by Sam Hrachovec.

The band entered Strongroom Music Studio in March 2015 to record their debut full-length. On 13 May 2015, they released the single "Good Enough", premiered by Vice Media. At the same time, they announced it would be a part of their debut full-length album Trickle, to be released through Dog Knights Productions. On 26 August 2015, they released the single "Ghost World", premiered by DIY. On 26 February 2016, they played Broadbay's EP release show, alongside Muskets and Beachtape. Between 10 and 22 March 2016, they toured the United Kingdom with Pipedream.

On 12 July 2017, they released the single "Over It", premiered by Upset. At the same time, they announced it would be a part of their upcoming self-titled EP, recorded by Theo Verney, and released through Art Is Hard Records. Between 12 and 16 July, they toured England with support from the New Tusk. They had a brief tour of southern England during August 2017 with Pinact. Between 30 October and 2 November, they headlined a tour of England, supporting Slowcoaches. On 24 January 2018, they released the single "Promises", confirming that their self-titled EP would be released on 3 March.

Following their 2018 disbandment, nembers of Birdskulls went on to form Abattoir Blues, Icehead and Public Body.

== Musical style ==
Critics categorised Birdskulls' music as soft grunge, emo and grunge. Their earliest work was slacker rock, largely influenced by Dinosaur Jr.. On Trickle (2015), they began to also take influence from Title Fight, Basement, Cloud Nothings, the Marked Men and Far. During this time, they were a part of the grunge revival, with DIY writer Samuel Cornforth calling them one of the bands in the movement most similar to the original grunge sound.

The band incorporated slow sludge metal-influenced guitar riffs, amplifier feedback, bouncy hooks and raspy vocals. They made use of effects units, in a 2015 interview, ack Pulman listed his pedals as including Boss Turbo Distortion Russian Electro Harmonix Big Muff and Boss Super Chorus. Their early work made heavy use of fuzz.

=== Legacy ===
Birdskulls were a forefront band in the British DIY music scene of the 2010s, alongside Bloody Knees and Nai Harvest, and headed a wave of British bands reviving an interest in guitar-based music alongside Joanna Gruesome, Flamingods and Bloody Knees. They helped to establish a sector of the Brighton punk scene typified by the fusion of the grunge and emo, alongside Muskets, Water Canvas, Broadbay and the New Tusk. In a 2019 article, The Line of Best Fit writer Ben Lynch called Birdskulls "heroes" of the Brighton scene, alongside the New Tusk and Broadbay. Their scene thrived between 2013 and 2017.

== Discography ==
Studio albums

- Trickle (2015)

EPs

- Bones / Alley Gorey (2014, split EP with Bloody Knees)
- Birdskulls (2018)

== Members ==
- Jack Pulman – vocals, guitar
- Rory Marshall – bass
- Nick Hoyes – drums
- Luke Ellis – drums
- Nick Wells – drums
- Sam Hrachovec – drums
