= Time in Malta (band) =

American hardcore band

- Origin: San Francisco, California, U.S.
- Genres: Melodic hardcore, hardcore punk
- Years active: 1997–2004
- Label: Equal Vision Records

Time in Malta was an American band from San Francisco, California.

== History ==
Time in Malta was a post-hardcore band formed in San Francisco, CA in 1998. All original members were originally from Indianapolis, Indiana. After recording a demo at Toast Studios, the band signed to Escape Artist Records and released its debut EP in July 1999. This lineup included lead vocalist/bassist Todd Gullion, drummer Sander Leech, and guitarist Chris Lyon. In 2001, Ryan Downey joined the group as lead vocalist, and former lead vocalist/bassist Todd Gullion continued on bass and backing vocals. The band played one show with this line up at legendary 924 Gilman Street; soon after Ryan left the band on good terms. 2002 saw the release of A Second Engine, their first full-length album, and their first release on Equal Vision Records. The band attracted attention for its openly political lyrical stances. Sander Leech having prior obligations could not go out to support the record so Eric Alexander joined playing drums. Todd Gullion asked friend Jesse Hayes to step in and play bass so he could focus on vocals. This lineup toured heavily for a year and a half. Eric Alexander parted ways with the band and moved to Los Angeles to focus on session drumming. The winter of 2003 Sander Leech returned for a brief tour supporting Year of the Rabbit and Thursday. Sander contributed to early songwriting for Alone with the Alone, but the record was eventually performed by new drummer Adam Goldstein. 2004 saw the release Time In Malta’s final studio album, issued on Equal Vision Records. The band disbanded winter of 2004.

Soon after the breakup Jesse Hayes went on to play for San Francisco pop band LoveLikeFire, leaving the band in 2007.

Chris Lyon went on to form San Francisco based pop band Rescue Me which has since disbanded.

As of September 2009, Jesse Hayes, Sander Leech and Todd Gullion reunited for new project titled Drawn Deep. The trio recorded a demo with keyboard contributions from Chris Lyon, which has not been released.

== Members ==
- Todd Gullion – bass, 2nd guitar, lead vocals (formerly of Blatherskite, Ice Nine, Problematics, and Burn it Down)
- Chris Lyon – guitar
- Sander Leech – drums (1998–2001, 2003)
- Jesse Hayes – Bass, back up vocals (2001–2004)
- Eric Alexander – drums (2001–2003)
- Adam Goldstein – drums (2003–2004)
- Ryan J. Downey – vocals (2001) (formerly of Burn it Down)

Timeline

== Discography ==
- Construct and Demolish EP (Escape Artist Records, 1999)
- Time in Malta/Breathe In split (2002)
- A Second Engine (Equal Vision Records, 2002)
- Alone with the Alone (Equal Vision, 2004)
