= Billy Werner =

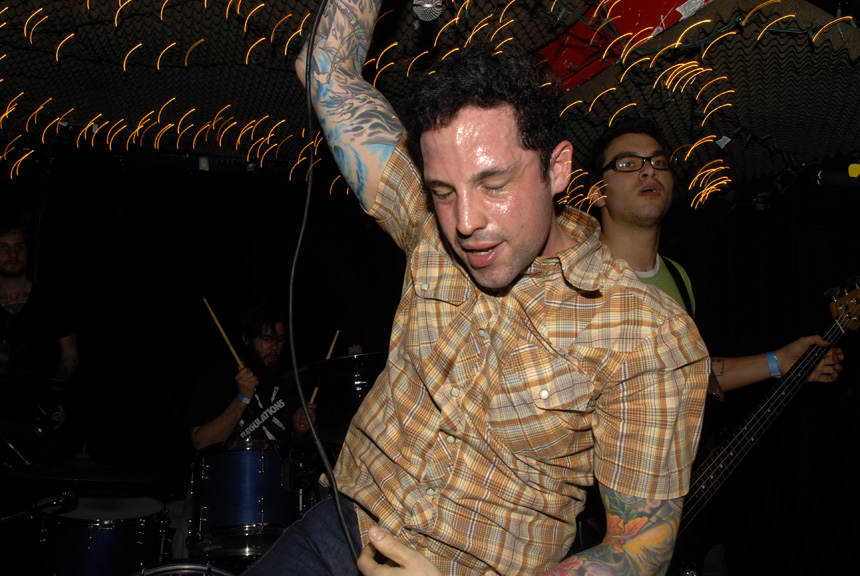
- Werner and Hot Cross at the Cake Shop in NYC

Background information
- Born: 1977 (age 47–48)
- Origin: Queens, New York
- Genres: Screamo, Emo, Punk, Dance Music, World
- Occupation(s): Singer, songwriter, dj
- Instruments: Vocals; drums
- Years active: 1997–present
- Labels: Level Plane
- Website: http://www.level-plane.com/hotcross

Billy Werner is an American musician, singer, songwriter, and DJ. He is best known as the lead vocalist of the post-hardcore bands Saetia and Hot Cross.

== Background ==
Raised in Queens, New York, Werner earned an undergraduate degree at New York University and a graduate degree at University College London.

Billy formed Saetia in 1997 with Greg Drudy, Jamie Behar, and Alex Madara. During their short lifespan of two and a half years, they released a self-titled EP, a self-titled full length, and their full discography on A Retrospective. Billy wrote the lyrics, and sang vocals for the band. The band broke up in 1999, due to personal problems, to form bands such as Off Minor, The Fiction, and Billy's own band, Hot Cross.

Hot Cross was formed shortly after Saetia broke up in 2000, with former Saetia drummer, Greg Drudy, Matt Smith, Casey Boland, and Josh Jakubowski. The band released A New Set of Lungs, their first EP, in 2002, and then released their critically acclaimed record, Cryonics, the Fair Trades & Farewells EP, and their latest record, Risk Revival, all on Level Plane records, except for Risk Revival released on Equal Vision records. The band's music was similar to Saetia and other Hot Cross members' former bands. The band went on indefinite hiatus, cutting short their 2007 tour.

He also currently deejays under the moniker Billy W as a disco DJ, M//R as a techno DJ and producer, and Werner Williams for his more spacey and house-inflected groovy tunes.
