= Bloody Knees =

English rock band

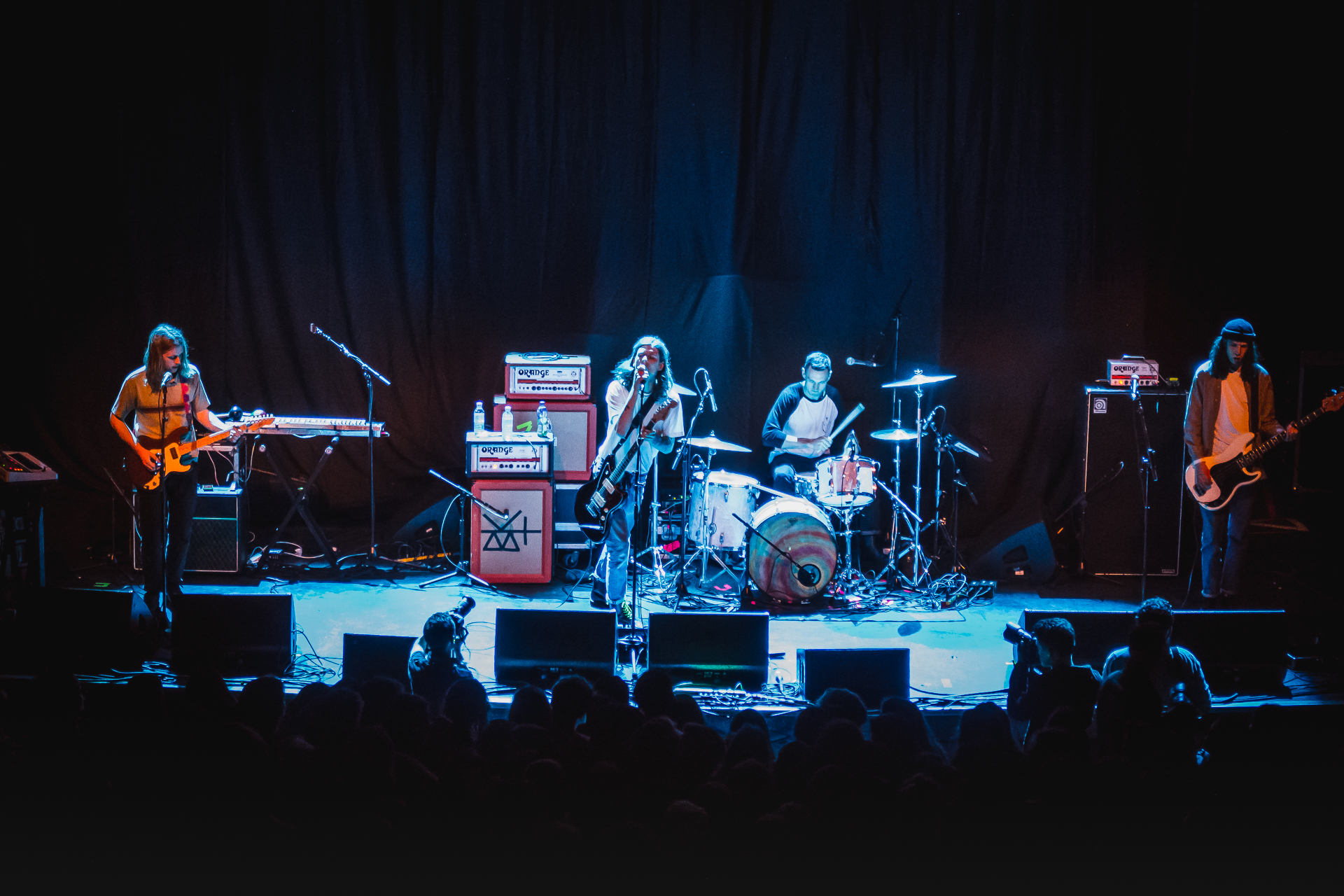
- Bloody Knees performing live in 2016

Background information
- Origin: Papworth Everard, Cambridgeshire, U.K.
- Genres: Emo; soft grunge; indie rock; garage punk; skate punk
- Years active: 2012–present
- Labels: Dog Knights, Art is Hard, Distiller
- Spinoff of: Five Minutes of Fame
- Members: Bradley Griffiths; Sam Conway; Christian Wilkes; Tom Wilkes

Bloody Knees are an English rock band formed in Papworth Everard in 2012. Combining elements of emo, grunge, Britpop and indie rock, they helped to establish the 2010s British emo and lo-fi music scenes. They released three solo extended plays, as well as a split EP with Brighton band Birdskulls. Their debut album What Else was released on 13 March 2016.

Bloody Knees has its origins in indie rock band Five Minutes of Fame, which disbanded when its members began attending various universities across the United Kingdom. The band's vocalist Bradley Griffiths soon dropped out of his university in Portsmouth, and began writing music. Discussing these songs with Five Minutes of Fame bassist Sam Conway and, their childhood friends, brothers Christian "Scotchy" Wilkes (guitar) and Tom Wilkes (drums), the four formed Bloody Knees upon returning home during their 2012 Easter holidays. They released their debut, self-titled EP the next year, followed in 2014 by their split EP with Birdskulls and solo EP Stitches. During the 2010s, the band toured extensively, their 2016 tour with Wolf Alice and Swim Deep being the subject of the docu-drama On the Road (2016). Their fourth EP You Can Have It was released in 2018. Around 2019, the entered an informal hiatus, performing live sporadically. They announced the end of their hiatus in January 2026.

== History ==
=== 2012: Formation ===
The members of Bloody Knees met while attending primary school in Papworth Everard. Vocalist and guitarist Bradley Griffiths and bassist Sam Conway formed their first band together, Five Minutes of Fame, when they were thirteen years old. The band played indie rock and were a part of the blog rock movement.

Five Minutes Of Fame disbanded when the members began attending separate universities across the United Kingdom. Soon, Griffiths dropped out of university, but stayed living in his university town of Portsmouth, where he began to write music again. Discussing his writing with Conway, as well as brothers Christian "Scotchy" Wilkes (guitar) and Tom Wilkes (drums), they planned to record the songs when they returned home for the Easter holidays. Bloody Knees officially formed in 2012. Publications variously described the band as based in Brighton, London, Southsea and Cambridge, in a 2014 interview with Punktastic they called Brighton their home scene. Their name was dervied from how the band's early were songs were written while Griffiths had cuts on his knees, sustained from skating. In a 2026 interview with Boys by Girls, he stated of the name "it was quite reflective of being young, skating and not really giving a fuck".

=== 2013–2016: Bloody Knees, split EP and Stitches ===
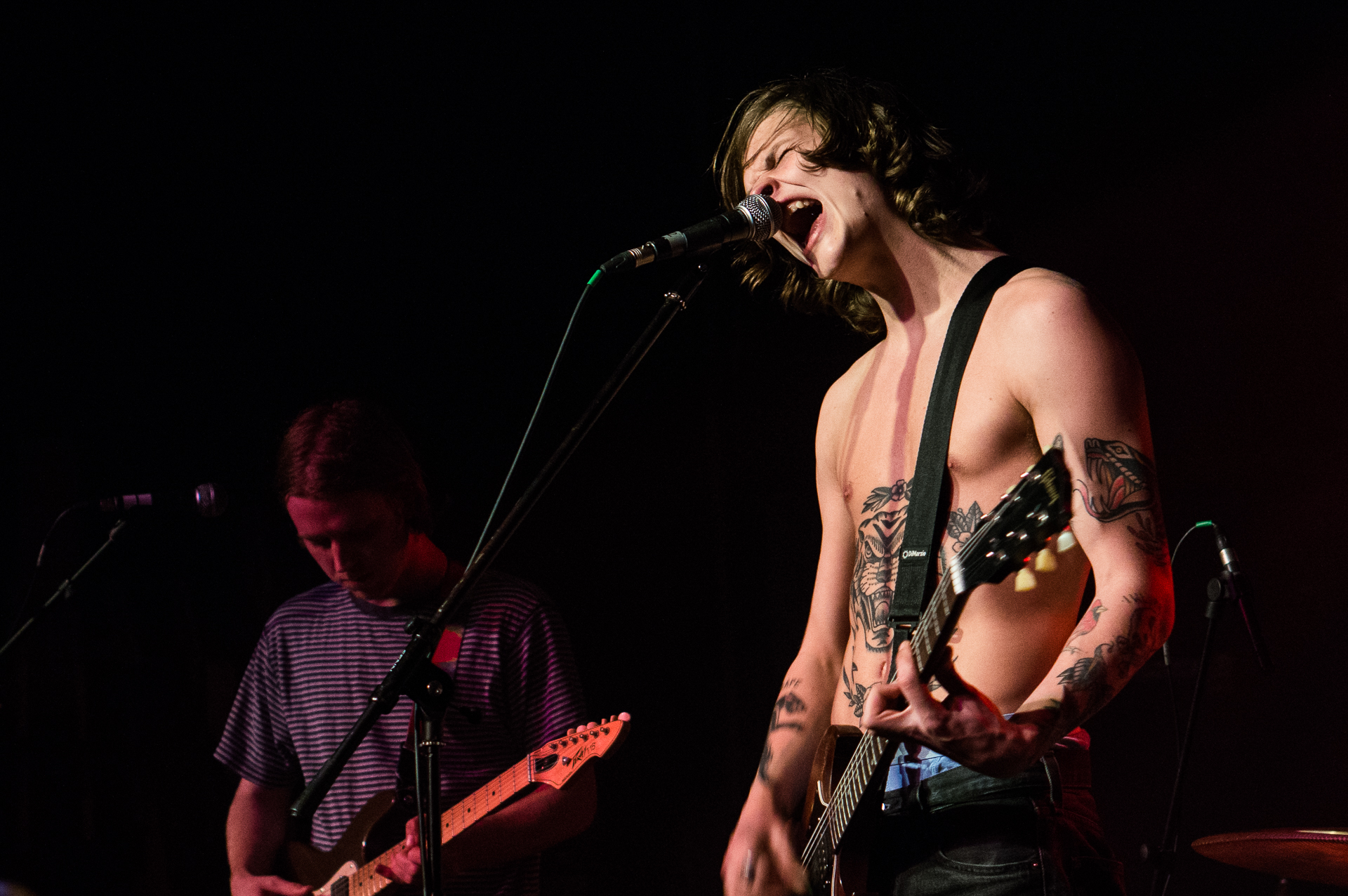
Christian Wilkes (left) and Bradley Griffiths (right) performing live in 2015

On 6 June 2013, they released the single "Dead", premiered by Punktastic. The song was a part of their debut, self-titled EP, released on 17 June. On 24 February 2014, they released a split EP with Birdskulls. On 29 July, they released the EP Stitches through Dog Knights Productions. The band had been recommended to the label by signees Nai Harvest. On 23 and 24 August, they performed at Reading and Leeds Festivals. On 11 September, they release the single "Daydream". Between 11 and 28 September, they toured the United Kingdom supporting Honeyblood. Between 23 March and 10 April 2015, they supported Wolf Alice on some dates of their UK tour with the Magic Gang. On 5 August 2015, they released the single "Stitches" and embarked on a UK tour with Cerebral Ballzy, concluding on 14 August, then performing at Reading and Leeds Festivals.

During March 2016, they supported Wolf Alice on their UK headline tour, alongside Swim Deep. The tour was the subject of the docu-drama On the Road, which premiered at the BFI London Film Festival in October of that year. On 24 March, they released the single "I Want It All". On 4 and 5 December, they took part in the Bands 4 Refugees concert, raising money for global refugee crisis, alongside Wolf Alice, the Vaccines, Soft Play and Alt-J, at London venue Kamio.

=== 2017–present: You Can Have It, hiatus and What Else ===
On 7 Augusy 2017, they released the single "Not Done", announcing it would a part of their upcoming EP Maybe It’s Easy, set for a release on 13 October, through Distiller Records. On 6 October 2017, they released the single "Maybe It's Easy". The Maybe It's Easy EP was premiered on 12 October by DIY. Between 14 October and 9 December, they toured the United Kingdom. During their April 2018 European headline tour, their equipment was stolen, leading them to launch a crowdfunder on 9 April. Wolf Alice lent them guitars for the remainder of the tour. On 13 August, they released the single "Spinning", premiered by BBC Radio 1 on Daniel P. Carter's Show Show. in addition to a music video directed by Samuel Taylor. On 6 September, they released the single "Reel", premiered by Wonderland magazine. Which was released as a part of their third EP You Can Have It, set for release on 5 October through a Distiller Records. Between 8 and 27 October, they headlined a tour of England.

On 19 November 2018, they released the single "Something Nice". They entered the studio in March 2020 to record their debut full-length album, In the following years, the band entered an informal, infrequent hiatus, performing sporadically. On 8 January 2026, they released the single "What Else". The following day, they announced the album's release. It was released as What Else on 13 March. On 19 January, they released the second single "My Paradise", followed on 19 February by the ballad "Be More". Soon, they announced a United Kingdom comeback tour, between 21 and 27 May, organised by Outbreak Festival.

== Musical style and legacy ==
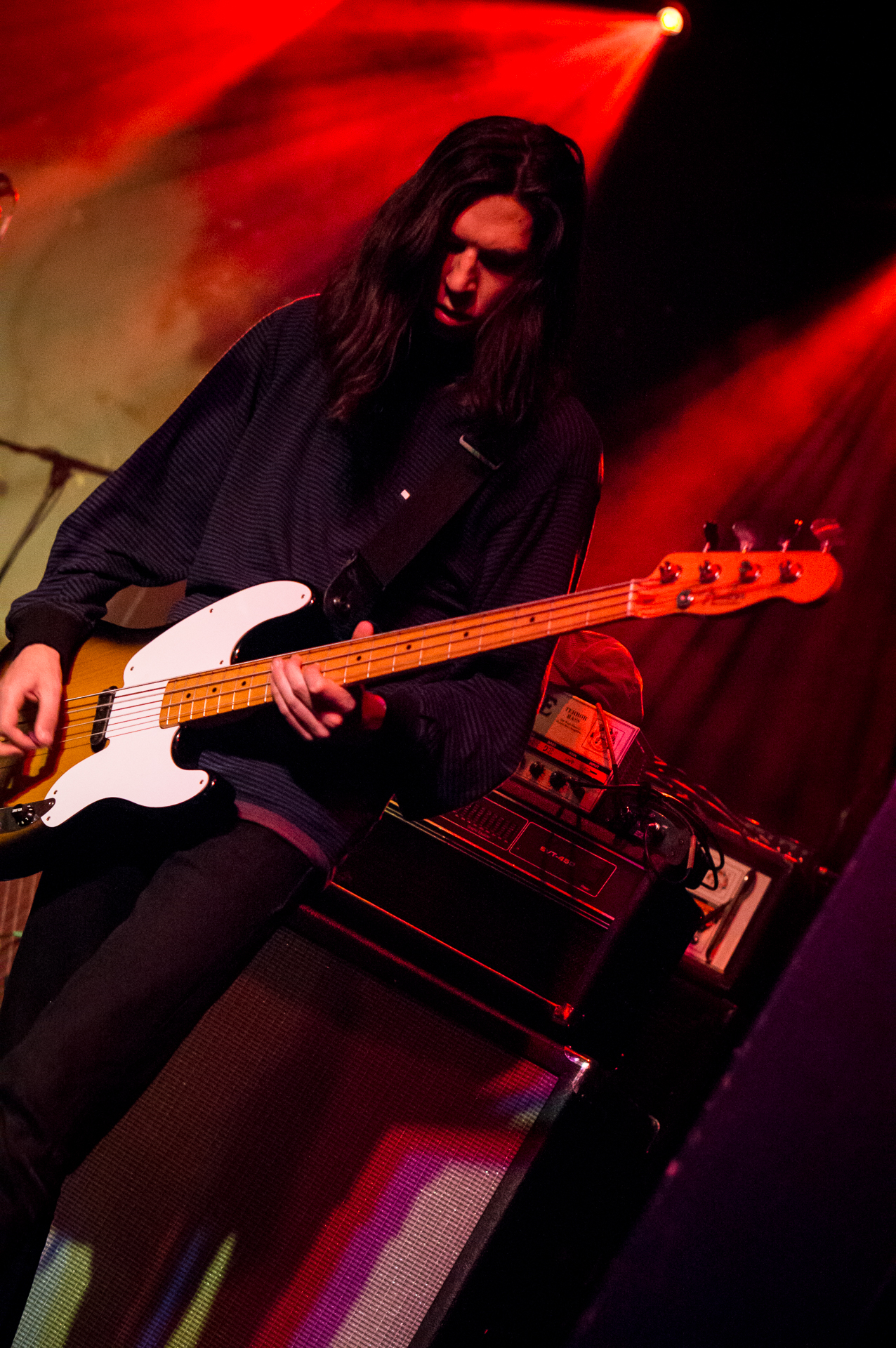
Sam Conway performing live in 2015

Critics have categorised Bloody Knees' music as emo, emo grunge, indie rock, skate punk and garage punk. Asier Lozano, co-founder of Spanish magazine Dod called them "brit-grunge", while DIY called the band "slacker-punk", mentioning their embrace of elements of the garage rock revival, as well as "what Nathan Williams fronting the Misfits would sound like". Vice Media described them as "Not dissimilar to gritty UK pop-punk bands like Gnarwolves and Birdskulls", but with "surf-pop guitar hooks that crash into a very British kind of melancholy". Counterfeit magazine called them "a less polished version of Eagulls". Stereogum called them "like Blue Album era Weezer if they'd hewed closer to Nirvana than Pavement".

Their music incorporates garage rock-inspired vocal melodies, grunge elements, distorted guitars with lead guitar hooks and gritty vocals. Often songs feature high tempos, although some songs are slower, particularly "Spinning". Their earliest material was garage punk, evolving by 2018 to also include elements of pop-punk, grunge and Britpop. In a 2018 interview with DIY, Griffiths said their songs are often written to encourage the live atmosphere.

Bloody Knees cite influences including Jimmy Eat World, Saves the Day, Alkaline Trio, Nirvana, Oasis, Don Broco, the Misfits and Lemmy of Motörhead. On What Else (2026), they were influenced the Dandy Warhols and DMA's.

The BBC credited the band with helping to establish a resurgence of emo and lo-fi music in the United Kingdom, with a 2014 Vice article called them and other signees of Dog Knights Productions "the shining light in the UK’s recent bleeding guitar resurgence". In a 2016 article, Vice called them "the gnarliest, most hard-working and reckless crews in British music". A 2015 NME article noted them as a forefront band in the British DIY music scene of the 2010s, alongside Birdskulls and Nai Harvest.

== Members ==
- Bradley Griffiths – vocals, guitar
- Sam Conway – bass
- Christian "Scotchy" Wilkes – guitar
- Tom Wilkes – drums

== Discography ==
Studio albums

- What Else (2026)

EPs

- Bloody Knees (2013)
- Birdskulls / Bloody Knees (2014; split EP with Birdskulls)
- Stitches (2014)
- You Can Have It (2018)
