= Love Lost But Not Forgotten =

American screamo band

Background information
- Also known as: Love Lost, LLBNF
- Origin: St. Peters, Missouri, U.S.
- Genres: Screamo; emoviolence; metalcore; grindcore (early)
- Years active: 1997–2003, 2005, 2008, 2010
- Labels: Happy Couples Never Last; Normal Records; The Archivist
- Past members: Scott Fogelbach; Jason Emerick; A.J. Doerhoff; Chris Grady; Matt Prater; Nathan Prater; Mike Schmitz

Love Lost But Not Forgotten was an American screamo band formed in 1997 in St. Peters, Missouri, composed of ex-members of End Over End and The Paxidils. Known for their violence onstage and unique vocals provided by a lineup that sometimes included two main vocalists (Prater and Schmidt both being solo vocals for the band at one time through the band's career.) and a trio of guitarists (Fogelbach and Emerick also surviving the lifetime of the band). The group has performed many tours across the United States and has performed with the likes of Converge and Godflesh. Since their break-up in 2003, the group has performed three different brief reunion shows in 2005, 2008 and 2010.

== History ==
The group formed in 1997 in St. Peters, Missouri, by vocalists Mike Shmitz and Nathan Prater, bassist Chris Grady, drummer Matt Prater, and guitarists Jason Emerick and Scott Fogelbach. The group would proceed to record two demos. The first was released in 1998, the second, titled Unfound, was released in 1999. That same year the group released a split 7-inch with Joshua Fit For Battle through Normal Records. Eventually, the group gained A.J. Doerhoff, their third guitarist, and were signed by Happy Couples Never Last. Their debut self-titled album was released in June 2000, garnering praise from the underground punk scene for its style. The group toured with the likes of Pg. 99, and by 2002, they released a third demo as well as their second full-length, Upon the Right, I Saw a New Misery. Both Schmitz and Doerhoff left the group before production of the album began. While both of these albums are now out-of-print, they were eventually reissued on digital formats through Robotic Empire's Archivist imprint.

By August 2002, Matt Prater left the group. To fill in his place, the group hired drummers for short periods at a time. By April 2003, the group went on a hiatus. This was due to the fact that Jason Emerick's father was, at the time, recently diagnosed with cancer. It was not until October of that same year when the group officially broke up. Their last show was performed in July 2003. Since their break-up, Grady and Fogelbach went on to perform in For The Last Time. Fogelbach also joined One Cycle Occur. Nathan Pater would go on to join Unholy Effers.

=== Reunions ===
Since their break-up in 2003, the group has reunited three times to play one-off shows. Their first reunion happened on January 15, 2005, at the Creepy Crawl, after first being announced back in December 2004. The line-up included Fogelbach, Grady, Emerick, and Nathan and Matt Prater. This line-up reunited again to perform a show in July 2008 at the Fubar, a venue in St. Louis, Missouri operated by a friend of the band. The band would perform again at the Fubar for a benefit show on October 1, 2010.

== Band members ==
Final line-up

- Nathan Prater – vocals (1997–2003, 2005, 2008, 2015)
- Tony Saputo – vocals (2015)
- Scott Fogelbach – lead guitar (1997–2003, 2005, 2008, 2015)
- Jason Emerick – rhythm guitar (1997–2003, 2005, 2008, 2015)
- Chris Grady – bass (1997–2003, 2005, 2008, 2015)
- Matt Prater – drums, backing vocals (1997–2002, 2005, 2008, 2015)

Previous members

- Mike Schmitz – vocals (1997–2001)
- A.J. Doerhoff – rhythm guitar (2000–2001)

Timeline

== Discography ==
Studio albums

- Love Lost But Not Forgotten (2000, Happy Couples Never Last)
- Upon the Right, I Saw a New Misery (2002, Happy Couples Never Last)

Extended plays and demos

- Love Lost But Not Forgotten CD-R (1998, self-released)
- Unfound EP (1999, self-released)
- split 7-inch with Joshua Fit For Battle (1999, Normal)
- Love Lost But Not Forgotten CD-R (2002, self-released)

Compilation appearances

- The Euridition Project – "Untitled" (2000, Emofag)
- I See Dead People – "Believe" (2000, Redscroll)
