= Anasarca (band) =

American emo band

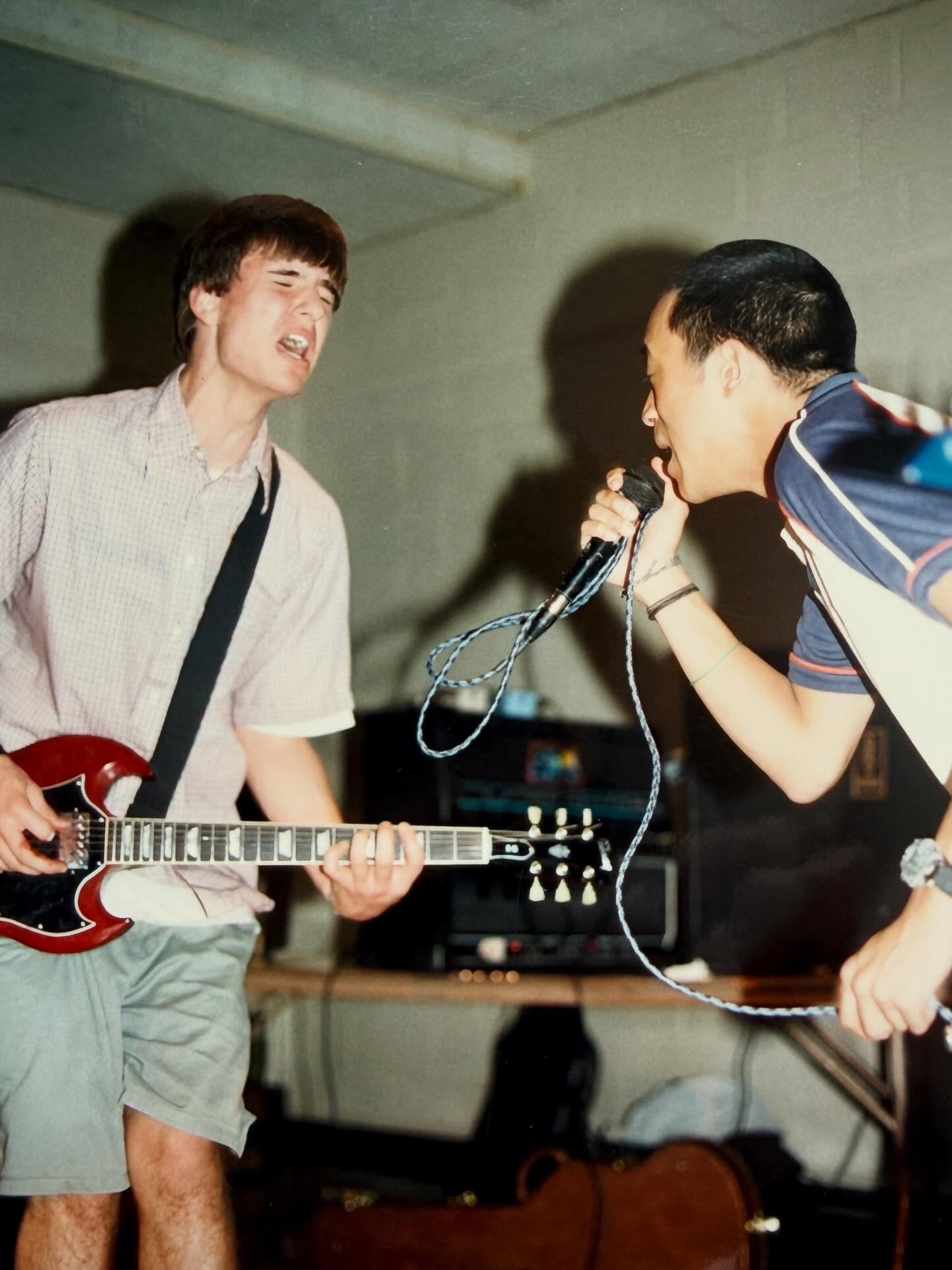
- Anasarca performing live in 1994

Background information
- Origin: Baltimore, Maryland, U.S.
- Genres: Screamo; emo; post-hardcore
- Years active: 1994–1997
- Labels: Planaria; Yuletide; Second Nature
- Members: Nick Pimentel; Chris Afzal; Carl Riddle; Jim Sajor; Jon Wilson
- Past members: Mike Weltz
- Website: anasarcadc.bandcamp.com

Anasarca was an American emo band from Baltimore, Maryland, later based in Washington, D.C., active from 1994 to 1997. The band released a total of seven songs spanning two 7-inch records and a demo tape, all of which were compiled into a full discography release by Second Nature Recordings in 2001.

== History ==
Anasarca formed in 1994 as a quintet consisting of vocalist Nick Pimentel, guitarists Chris Afzal and Carl Riddle, bassist Jim Sajor, and drummer Mike Weltz. In the summer of that year, the band recorded and released a four-song self-titled demo tape on Pimentel's own record label, Planaria Recordings.

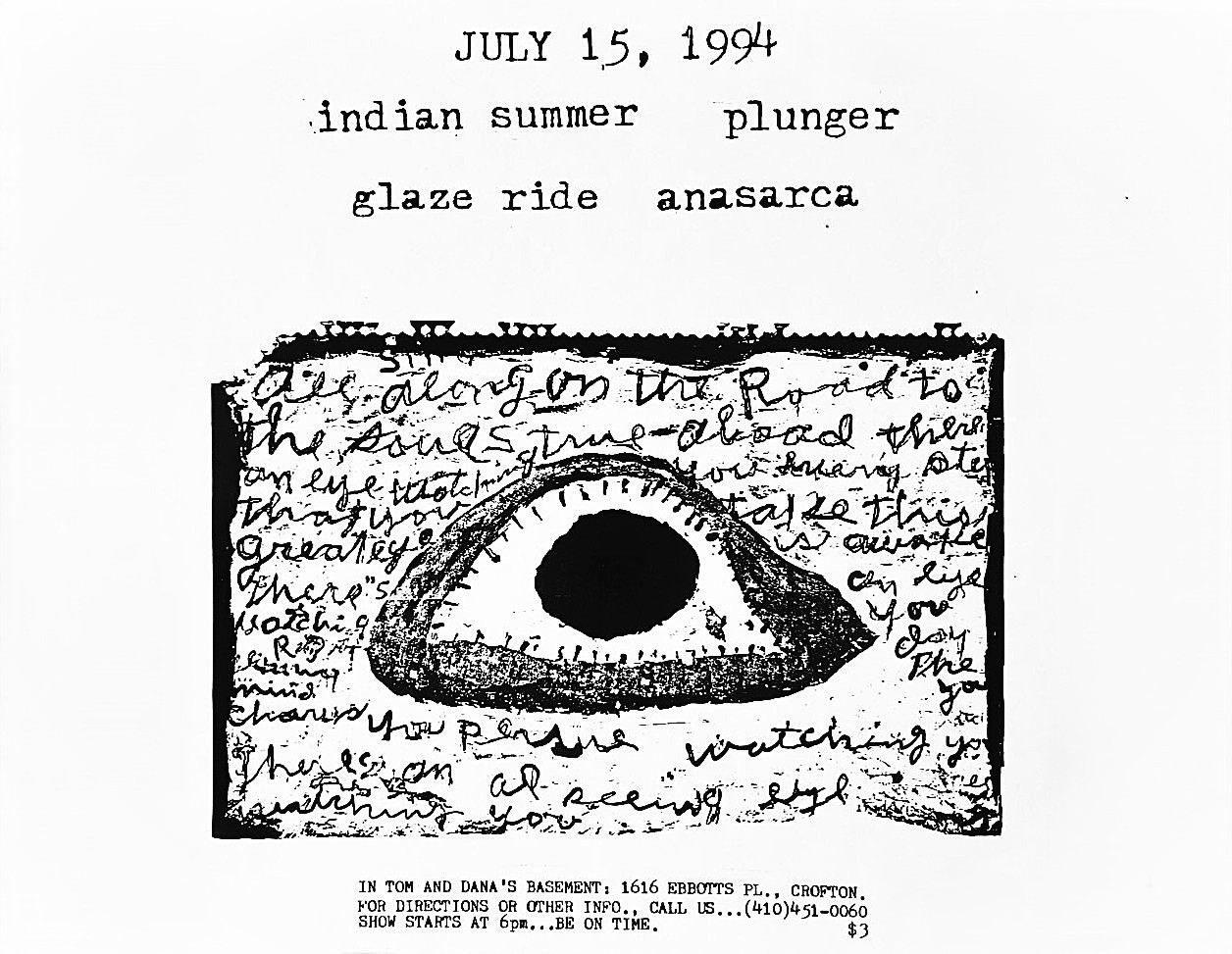
Flyer for a show featuring Indian Summer, Plunger, Glazeride, and Anasarca from 1994

In 1995, Anasarca released a two-song EP (East Bunk Hill / Eugene Debs) on Yuletide Records, a Pennsylvania-based label that had previously released records by other notable bands in the emo scene at the time, such as Philadelphia natives Frail.

The band embarked on a short tour in the summer of 1995, playing shows across the East Coast. They performed a number of shows alongside fellow emo band Anonymous, with whom they became friends, and ultimately recorded a split 7-inch with later that year. The record, titled Anasarca V. Anonymous, released in early 1996 on Planaria and was distributed by Ebullition Records. Around this time, drummer Mike Weltz left the band and was replaced by Jon Wilson. The split with Anonymous featured what would be the final song that Anasarca wrote and recorded before disbanding in 1997, titled "Everything Was Beautiful And Nothing Hurt." The song title is a quote found in the 1969 novel Slaughterhouse-Five by Kurt Vonnegut.

In 2001, Second Nature Recordings released Discography 1994-1997, a compilation album containing the band's entire recorded output. The album was initially issued on CD, and later on vinyl by Planaria in 2002.

== Musical style and legacy ==
Anasarca's musical style has been described as having brooding song structures while incorporating twinkly, groovy guitar elements and mellow breakdowns. Andy Malcolm of Collective Zine has compared their sound to early emo and progressive screamo acts such as Embassy, Chino Horde, and Ordination of Aaron. Chris Gramlich of Exclaim! described them as "musically aggressive yet melodic," while comparing their sound to that of Canadian post-hardcore band Shotmaker. Ink 19 writer Nathan Birk compared Anasarca to the likes of Rites of Spring and Hoover, describing their sound as discordant and possessing a "loosely clattering yet supremely tense" style.

In an album review for the band's 2001 discography release, Camilo Arturo Leslie of Pitchfork labeled Anasarca as both metal and metalcore. He characterized vocalist Nick Pimentel as abrasive, stating that he has an "I-don't-do-notes"-style, which Leslie claims has established a genre of its own since the band's 1997 dissolution. Additionally, he noted that the band had managed to earn themselves an influential status subsequently after their three-year lifespan. Sputnikmusic reviewed Anasarca's discography release positively, defining their musical style as "cry baby mid to late 90's emo that hung out somewhere between Dischord emocore and Saetia's screamo."

In a list of ‘The Ten Most Underrated Emo Records Of All Time’, Alex Smith of Cinepunx ranked Anasarca's East Bunk Hill / Eugene Debs 7-inch number six, in which he wrote: "this enigmatic group straddled the line between total hardcore freak out and wistful indie-rock like no other." Smith likened their guitar work to "beautiful, elegiac buzzsaws" and explained that the band's dramatic vocals is what makes the record so notable. On the (((((OPENmind/SATURATEDbrain))))) Podcast, Jamie Behar even went as far as to say that the record was a huge step towards what screamo is today. Behar further discussed the influence Anasarca had on his own bands (Saetia and Off Minor) in a segment from the podcast titled "Let's start a band that sounds like Anasarca."

Karol Kamiński of IDIOTEQ has described the band as "legendary" and stated that they have left a massive impact on the screamo genre, despite their elusiveness. Additionally, he cited their song "East Bunk Hill" as "one of the heaviest and saddest songs ever put to tape."

== Members ==
=== Final lineup ===
- Nick Pimentel – lead vocals (1994–1997)
- Chris Afzal – guitar, vocals (1994–1997)
- Carl Riddle – guitar, vocals (1994–1997)
- Jim Sajor – bass, vocals (1994–1997)
- Jon Wilson – drums (1996–1997)

=== Past members ===
- Mike Weltz – drums (1994–1996)

== Discography ==
=== Extended plays ===
- East Bunk Hill / Eugene Debs (1995, Yuletide)
- Anonymous V. Anasarca (1996, Planaria)

=== Demos ===
- Anasarca (1994, Planaria)

=== Compilation albums ===
- Discography 1994-1997 (2001, Second Nature)

=== Compilation appearances ===
- Hand Made Words (1995, Toyland)
- Взорванное Небо No.1 (1997, Взорванное Небо)
- This Changes Everything – A Second Nature Recordings Sampler (2000, Second Nature)
