= Bellavista (band) =

- Origin: San Francisco, California; U.S.
- Genres: Indie rock, psychedelic rock, shoegaze, new romantic
- Label: Take Root Records
- Members: Rex Shelverton; Jeremy Bringetto; Cary LaScala
- Past members: Matthew Bajda; Rachel Hoiem
- Website: http://www.bellavista.tv

Bellavista is an indie rock/shoegaze band from San Francisco, California. The current lineup includes guitarist/vocalist Rex John Shelverton, bassist Jeremy Bringetto, and drummer Cary LaScala. Shelverton is also known for being a co-founder of the band/duo Tamaryn.

== History ==
Shelverton, Bringetto and Bajda were childhood friends who grew up around Half Moon Bay in Northern California.

All three, along with Jonah Buffa, were originally members of the influential 1990s hardcore punk band Portraits of Past, who helped pioneer the sound that would later become known as screamo. Portraits of Past reformed in 2008, but quickly broke up again in 2009.

Shelverton, Bringetto and Buffa were next in the post-punk band The Audience, who released the 1997 Das Audience album on Hymnal Sound and the "Young Soul" 7" single on Gold Standard Laboratories.

Their next band, Vue, formed in 1999 in San Francisco and included Shelverton, Bringetto, Buffa and final drummer Cary LaScala. Vue released three albums: Vue (2000, Sub Pop), Find Your Home (2001, Sub Pop) and Down for Whatever (2003, RCA). They also released the Babies Are for Petting EP on RCA in 2003. Between 2001 and 2004, Vue performed with The Rolling Stones, Black Rebel Motorcycle Club, Franz Ferdinand, The Faint and Trail Of Dead. Vue disbanded at the end of 2004.

Shelverton, Bringetto and LaScala then formed Bellavista, and released their eponymous debut LP on April 24, 2007, on Take Root Records. From 2008 to 2017, LaScala was replaced by Bajda. In 2017, Bajda left to focus on his art and LaScala rejoined the band.

Bellavista's single, "Always Oneness" backed by "Under the Walls", was released on November 6, 2012, as a vinyl 7" with download card, at first available only at Tamaryn's tour merchandise table.

Bellavista's second album Sun and Skyway was digitally released June 13, 2017 on Apple Music, Spotify, and Bandcamp.

Bellavista's single "Feline / Nocturnal" was digitally released January 23, 2018 on Apple Music, Spotify, and Bandcamp.

== Band members ==
- Rex Shelverton – guitar, vocals
- Jeremy Bringetto – bass
- Cary LaScala – drums

== Discography ==
=== Studio albums ===
- Bellavista (2007, Take Root Records; 2008, KNTRST)

=== Singles ===
- "Always Oneness" / "Under the Walls" 7"/digital (2012, self-released)
