= Torches To Rome =

American post-hardcore band

- Origin: San Francisco, California, U.S.
- Genres: Emo; post-hardcore; hardcore punk; screamo
- Years active: 1995–1998
- Label: Ebullition
- Spinoffs: Bread And Circuits; Please Inform The Captain This Is A Hijack; Baader Brains; Mothercountry Motherfuckers
- Spinoff of: Fuel; Pinhead Gunpowder; Silver Bearing; Sawhorse; John Henry West; Navio Forge; Portraits of Past
- Past members: Sarah Kirsch; Steve Chamberlain; Aaron Lee Schlieve

Torches To Rome was an American post-hardcore band from the San Francisco Bay Area, that was active from 1995 to 1998. Formed by Sarah Kirsch (formerly of Fuel, Pinhead Gunpowder, Sawhorse, John Henry West, Navio Forge), alongside Steve Chamberlain and Aaron Lee Schlieve (formerly of Portraits of Past), the band released a self-titled demo tape and a single studio album on Ebullition Records.

== Musical style ==
Influenced by the likes of Fugazi and other D.C. bands, Torches To Rome's musical style has often been described as aggressive, urgent, and powerful. In a review of their sole full-length release, Andy Malcolm of Collective Zine labeled them as "A more political, more frantic, more intense, more heavy Hot Water Music," while Jason Rockhill of Ink 19 praised their spirit on the record by dubbing them "Rebel Rock overflowing with passion and smarts." Kent McClard, owner of Ebullition, defined the band by writing: "The Torches To Rome sound was powerful and aggressive hardcore that always maintained a fantastic sense of groove and melody with impassioned singing." Furthermore, he explained that though the band's sound was a combination of all three members' musical input, they primarily shared sonic relations to Kirsch's previous acts.

== Band members ==
- Sarah Kirsch (Note: She was known as Mike Kirsch during the band's existence before coming out as a transgender woman many years after their dissolution.) - vocals, guitar (1995–1998)
- Steve Chamberlain - vocals, bass (1995–1998)
- Aaron Lee Schlieve - drums (1995–1998)

== Discography ==
=== Studio albums ===
- Torches★To★Rome (1998, Ebullition)

=== Demos ===
- Torches To Rome (1995, Self-released)

=== Compilation appearances ===
- For Want Of... (1995, X-Mist)
- The Ebullition Records Box Set (2000, Ebullition)
