= Discography 1994-1997 =

Compilation album by Anasarca
- Released: 2001, 2002 (reissue)
- Recorded: 1994–1995
- Studios: SNP Studios, Washington, D.C.
- Genres: Emo; screamo; post-hardcore
- Length: 32:07
- Labels: Second Nature; Planaria
- Producers: Ken Olden; Seth Alexander

Anasarca chronology
Anonymous V. Anasarca (1996)	Discography 1994-1997 (2001)

Professional ratings
Review scores
Source	Rating
Pitchfork	4.8/10
Exclaim!	favorable
Collective Zine	favorable
Ink 19	favorable

Discography 1994-1997 is a compilation album by American emo band Anasarca, released in 2001. The album consists of all seven songs recorded and released during the band's three year existence. Initially issued on CD by Second Nature Recordings, it was later repressed on vinyl in 2002 by vocalist Nick Pimentel's label, Planaria Recordings.

== Track listing ==
All tracks are written by Anasarca.

No.	Title	Length
1.	"East Bunk Hill"	5:43
2.	"Eugene Debs"	5:16
3.	"Everything Was Beautiful And Nothing Hurt"	4:59
4.	"Stationary People"	3:52
5.	"Enginize"	4:50
6.	"You Know"	3:49
7.	"So Tell Me"	3:38
Total length:		32:07

- Tracks 1 and 2 were released as a self-titled 7-inch (also referred to as East Bunk Hill / Eugene Debs) in 1995.
- Track 3 was released as a split 7-inch with Anonymous, titled Anonymous V. Anasarca, in 1996.
- Tracks 4, 5, 6 and 7 were released as a self-titled demo tape in 1994.

== Personnel ==
=== Anasarca ===
- Nick Pimentel - vocals
- Chris Afzal - guitar, vocals
- Carl Riddle - guitar, vocals
- Jim Sajor - bass, vocals
- Mike Weltz - drums

=== Technical personnel ===
- Karen Beard - photography, layout
- Ken Olden - mixing, engineering
- Seth Alexander - engineering
- Charlie "Octopus" - mixing
