= Usurp Synapse =

American screamo band

- Origin: Lafayette, Indiana, U.S.
- Genres: Screamo; hardcore punk; grindcore; emoviolence
- Years active: 1998–2001; 2004; 2023–present
- Labels: Clean Plate Records; Electric Human Project; Happy Couples Never Last; Level Plane Records; Magister Ludi Records; Witching Hour Records
- Members: John Scott; Travis Chance; Don Kirkland; Tony Dryer
- Past members: Dustin Redington; Brandon Harris; Dean Duval; Antonio Leiriao; Mike Dixon

Usurp Synapse is an American screamo band from Lafayette, Indiana, formed in 1998. The band is known for their fast and frantic grindcore influenced drumming and guitar work, and raw screams.

== History ==
Usurp Synapse formed in 1998 in Lafayette, Indiana. Their line up changed somewhat frequently during their initial run. Antonio Leiriao, their second vocalist, originally lived in New York before he moved to Indiana in 1999 to join the group. Most of their music was released through split albums with other artists, perhaps their most famous split being their Just Do It! record with Hassan I Sabbah, which included razor blades. Unconventional marketing methods such as this was utilized by the band throughout their run.

In 2000, they toured the United States along with Jeromes Dream, who they also released a split with, and Racebannon from May to June. This would become the only major nationwide tour for the band. In 2001, they announced plans to do another tour in the United States, Europe, and Japan over the summer. They also announced plans to release a split with Pg. 99, a split with Mara'akate shaped as Indiana, and what would have been the band's first full-length album, which was under the working title of ATM Diatribe. That same year Mike Dixon (who previously worked in the band Rep Seki) joined Usurp Synapse as the keyboardist.

Later that same year it was announced that all plans, except for ATM Diatribe, had to be cancelled. ATM Diatribe was initially supposed to be released on compact disc and vinyl through Happy Couples Never Last, however that too was cancelled when the band broke up in the spring of 2001. The tracks from the ATM Diatribe sessions, along with the rest of the band's recorded discography, was eventually released on Disinformation Fix, a discography compilation released through Alone Records.

In 2008, the group released A Vile Contamina through their Myspace page for free. The EP included material recorded during their reformative period.

Former members of the band would later join other projects such as Fax Arcana and The Drago Miette, both of whom are now disbanded. Antonio Leirao would move on to the indie rock band Thin Fevers and is now a funk DJ. Chance now works as a session drummer in New York and was one of the many drummers who played in The Boredoms 2008 88 Boadrums event.

In 2019, there were talks of another reunion, and a new EP titled Adult Adoption was released, being a solo release by the band's guitarist Don Kirkland. It was released under the name of The Usurp Synapse, as that was the name used by the band for their unofficial extra releases. This event didn't mark a new reunion of the band.

In 2023, the band reunited officially, under a new incarnation made up of Antonio, Don, John, and Travis. They re-released their EP A Vile Contamina but with newly recorded vocals, and released an entirely new single titled Guitargoyles Just Wanna Have Fun which led to the release of the EP Polite Grotesqueries made up of brand new material. The band went on a tour alongside modern screamo and mathcore bands Frail Body and Meth, and then a tour with Gillian Carter and Thrull in 2024. The band also added new guitarist Brian Wyrick, from the band Mara'akate.

In 2025, they went on a tour with the band Missouri Executive Order 44, which led to the release of a split EP between the two bands.

== Band members ==
Current members

- Antonio Leiriao – vocals (1999–2001, 2023–present)
- John Scott – vocals, keyboards (1998–2001, 2004, 2023–present); bass (2023–present)
- Don Kirkland – guitars (1998–2001, 2004, 2023–present); trombone (2000)
- Brian Wyrick – guitars (2025–present)
- Travis Chance – drums, percussion (1998–2000, 2004, 2023–present); keyboards (2000)

Former members

- Mike Dixon – guitars, bass (2000); keyboards (2001)
- Dean Duval – guitars (1998–1999)
- Brandon Harris – guitars (1999–2001)
- Dustin Redington – bass (1998–1999)
- Tony Dryer – bass (1999–2001, 2004)
- Jeremy King – drums, percussion (2000)
- Heather Rae – keyboards (2000)
- Jerry Atwood – keyboards (2000)
- Stephanie Shankel – keyboards, trombone, trumpet (2000)
- Christopher Williams – vocals (2000)
- David Britts – vocals (2000)

== Discography ==
=== Split releases ===
Year	Album Details	Notes
1999	Index For Potential Suicide/Usurp Synapse: Released: 1999; Label: Witching Hour Records; Format: 7"	1100 black copies, 200 orange copies. 100 copies had special tour edition covers, 20 came with xerox'd covers Split with Index For Potential Suicide.
1999	Index Of Isolation: Released: 1999; Label: Happy Couples Never Last Records; Format: 7"	1000 black colored copies. Split with Emotion Zero.
2000	Rep Seki/Usurp Synapse: Released: 2000; Label: Magester Ludi Records; Format: 5" picture disc	1000 picture disc copies, split with Rep Seki
2000	The Chilling Tale Of Usurp Synapse, As Told By Neil Perry: Released: May 1, 2000; Label: Level Plane Records; Format: 7"	1100 black copies, 100 copies had alternative artwork under the name Comes Around, Goes Around. Split with Neil Perry.
2000	Just Do It!: Released: July 3, 2000; Label: Electric Human Project; Format: 7"	1000 black copies, 100 white, 5 test pressings. All white copies came with a razor blade with "have fun!" written on it, some copies also included a bandage stuck onto the front cover. Split with Hassan I Sabbah.
2000	An Aspirin, An X-Ray: Released: August 2000; Label: Clean Plate Records/Level Plane Records; Format: 7"	1300 white copies, 200 black copies, 20 test pressings. 15 copies had alternative cover art. Some copies included a tour pin. Split with Jeromes Dream

=== Extended plays ===
Year	Album Details	Notes
1999	In Examination Of: Released: March 4, 1999 [6"] May 1, 2000 [7"]; Label: Level Plane Records/Witching Hour Records; Format: 6", 7"	First released in 1999 as a 6" consisting of 666 black copies. 25 copies were sold at live shows with alternative artwork. Reissued in 2000 as a 7" consisting of 200 translucent red copies which was only available through mail-order. The first 99 copies of the 6" version came with "blood pills" (pills with fake blood in them)
1999	This Endless Breath: Released: September 1999; Label: Happy Couples Never Last Records; Format: CD	1000 copies were wrapped in paper, 50 copies were tour editions that came with black covers, 50 copies came with cobra covers. All copies came with stickers.
2000	The Main Ingredient: Released: 2000; Label: Self-released; Format: 7"	Known as "the penis 7 inch" due to its packaging: The front side of the cover included a flap designed as a penis, and the back side included a hole shaped as a vagina. The 7" only included the title track on both sides, however the second side has "Tour Release of 200" etched on it, making it impossible to play. Limited to 200 pink copies.
2008	A Vile Contamina: Released: August 2008; Label: Self-released; Format: DL	Intended to be released sometime in 2004, but shelved soon after completion. It was eventually released for free download on the band's Myspace page in 2008.

=== Compilation albums ===
Year	Album Details	Notes
2003	Disinformation Fix: Released: 2003; Label: Alone Records; Format: 2xCD	Discography compilation that included every single song Usurp Synapse recorded up to that point, including songs from the sessions for the scrapped ATM Diatribe album.

=== Compilation Appearances ===
Year	Album Details	Song
2000	Summertime: Released: 2000; Label: Kordava Milk Bar Records; Format: CD	"More Than Meets The Eye"
2000	HCNL Sampler V1.07.00: Released: 2000; Label: Happy Couples Never Last Records; Format: CD-R	"Oh, You Are Sick"
2000	Songs Of The Dead 2: Idle Hands: Released: September 2000; Label: And Heres Where My Troubles Began Records; Format: CD	"Brundle Fly"
2000	Antipodes: Released: October 2000; Label: Level Plane Records; Format: 7"	"Good Luck With Your Book"
2001	Relics Of Ordinary Life: Released: 2001; Label: Happy Couples Never Last Records; Format: CD	"..."
