= The Gray In Between =

Studio album by Jeromes Dream
- Released: May 3, 2023
- Recorded: May–June 2022
- Studio: The Atomic Garden (Oakland)
- Genre: Screamo; hardcore punk
- Length: 24:45
- Label: Iodine
- Producer: Jack Shirley

Jeromes Dream chronology
LP (2019)	The Gray In Between (2023)

The Gray In Between is the fourth album by the American emo band Jeromes Dream. It was released in 2023 by Iodine Recordings.

== Reception ==
The Gray In Between received positive reviews from critics. Brendan Schroer of Sputnikmusic gave the album a perfect score out of five stars, stating that the album "shows the band in peak form, retaining their signature extremity while expanding their sound past its usual borders". Lars Gotrich of NPR said that The Gray In Between was a "welcome return" to the style of their older albums, stating that "The Gray In Between, while not exactly hopeful or despairing, empathetically injects split-second shrieks as punctuation marks between ruptured riffs and the ache of existence".

== Track listing ==
The Gray In Between track listing
No.	Title	Length
1.	"Conversations In Time, On Mute"	2:50
2.	"Stretched Invisible From London"	2:35
3.	"South By Isolation"	2:30
4.	"Pines on the Hill (With Guests)"	3:59
5.	"Cosmos In Season"	1:01
6.	"AAEEAA"	2:09
7.	"On Holiday with Infinity"	2:12
8.	"The Future of Memory"	2:02
9.	"Often Oceans"	1:58
10.	"The Last Water Pearl"	3:25
Total length:		24:45

== Personnel ==
Personnel per liner notes.

Jeromes Dream

- Jeff Smith – vocals, bass
- Erik Ratensperger – drums, piano, art direction
- Sean Leary – guitar

Other personnel

- Jack Shirley – recording, mixing, mastering
- Piper Ferrari – design assistance
