= Happy Couples Never Last =

- Founded: 1998
- Founder: Clark Giles
- Defunct: 2006
- Status: Defunct
- Distributor: Lumberjack Label Group
- Genre: Hardcore punk, post-hardcore, alternative rock
- Country of origin: U.S.
- Location: Indianapolis, Indiana
- Official website: Archived site

Happy Couples Never Last was an American independent record label founded in Indianapolis, Indiana in 1998 by Clark Giles.

According to Giles, the label started when he saved up money to take his girlfriend on a trip, however they broke up and Giles ended up using the money to help his friends release music.

The label produced over 40 recordings, and is seen as an important figure during the second-wave screamo scene during the late 1990s and early 2000s, releasing early recordings by Usurp Synapse, Love Lost But Not Forgotten, and Pg. 99, as well as releasing the compilation album Relics of Ordinary Life, which included contributions by various screamo acts. Other notable acts that released recordings through the label include The Plot to Blow Up the Eiffel Tower and Racebannon. The label is inactive, their latest release being issued in 2006.

== Label roster ==
- About the Fire
- Advocate
- Angelville
- Anodyne
- Arma Angelus
- Better Off Dead
- Breather Resist
- Creation's End
- Eclipse of Eden
- Emotion Zero
- Find Him and Kill Him
- Freedom for Saturn
- Harkonen
- Ice Nine
- Lefty's Deceiver
- Love Lost But Not Forgotten
- Majhas
- Mara'akate
- Pg. 99
- Phoenix Bodies
- Premonitions of War
- Racebannon
- Shakespace
- Tamora
- The Drago Miette
- The Dream Is Dead
- The Dropscience
- The Plot to Blow Up the Eiffel Tower
- The Warmth
- Three in the Attic
- Usurp Synapse
- Vinyl Star
- Wasteland D.C.
