= Six Sik Sisters =

Studio album by Racebannon
- Released: October 18, 2011
- Recorded: 2010–2011
- Genre: Hardcore; punk; noise punk
- Label: Tizona
- Producer: Kurt Ballou

Racebannon chronology
Acid or Blood (2008)	Six Sik Sisters (2011)

Six Sik Sisters is the sixth full-length studio recording from Bloomington, Indiana noise-punk quartet Racebannon. Produced by Converge guitarist Kurt Ballou, it was released in late 2011 on Tizona Records.

== Reception ==
Professional ratings
Review scores
Source	Rating
AllMusic	4/5 stars

Allmusic's Phil Freeman compared the album favorably to both Converge (saying that the disc has "the roomy, organic punk-metal throb he-Kurt Ballou-specializes in) and "Melvins-esque half-speed misanthropy."

== Track listing ==
- All tracks written and arranged by Racebannon
1. "Thee Plea" 2:44
2. "Thee Apology" 2:49
3. "Thee Interlude" :52
4. "Thee Brother" 3:11
5. "Thee Truth" 1:34
6. "Thee Solo" 2:45
7. "Thee Challenge" 2:24
8. "Thee Desperate" 4:05
9. "Thee End" 4:42

== Personnel ==
- Mike Anderson: vocal
- James Bauman: guitars
- Chris Saligoe: bass
- Brad Williams: drums, percussion

== Production ==
- Produced, recorded and mixed by Kurt Ballou
- Mastered by Alan Douches
- Cover design by Aaron Tanner
