= Escape Artist Records =

- Founded: 1997
- Status: Inactive 2008
- Genre: Hardcore punk, extreme metal, experimental rock, indie rock
- Country of origin: United States
- Location: Philadelphia, Pennsylvania
- Official website: www.escapeartistrecords.com

Escape Artist Records was an American independent record label formed in 1997 and based in suburban Philadelphia, Pennsylvania. The label, which helped to launch the careers of bands such as Isis, Keelhaul and Time in Malta, ceased operations in 2008.

== Past artist roster ==
- 27
- American Heritage
- Anodyne
- Blunderbuss
- Burn It Down
- Collapsar
- The Dream Is Dead
- Ganglahia
- In Pieces
- Isis
- Lickgoldensky
- KEN mode
- Keelhaul
- Playing Enemy
- Theory of Ruin
- Time in Malta
- Under Pressure
