= Risk Revival =

Studio album by Hot Cross
- Released: February 20, 2007
- Genres: Screamo; Post-Hardcore; Math rock
- Length: 43:48
- Label: Equal Vision
- Producer: Hot Cross

Hot Cross chronology
Hot Cross/The Holy Shroud Split 7" (2005)	Risk Revival (2007)

Professional ratings
Review scores
Source	Rating
Allmusic	3/5 stars
Metal Hammer	8/10 stars
Visions.de	8/12

Risk Revival is the second and final album released by Hot Cross on Equal Vision, released on February 20, 2007. This is their first full-length after the departure of guitarist Josh Jakubowski.

== Track listing ==
1. "Exits and Trails" - 3:51
2. "Turncoat Revolution" – 4:25
3. "Resent Resist Rebuild" - 0:38
4. "Fire the Foundations" – 3:15
5. "Cardiac Silence" – 3:19
6. "Kill the Name" – 3:52
7. "Silence Is Failure" – 2:42
8. "Fatefully" – 4:16
9. "Existence" – 3:21
10. "Rejoinder" – 3:13
11. "Finance Fuels the Sickness at Heart" - 4:04
12. "Blame Truth" - 1:54
13. "Scrape Wisdom" - 4:58
