= Seeing Means More Than Safety =

Studio album by Jeromes Dream
- Released: May 2000
- Recorded: December 4–5, 1999
- Studios: Godcity Recording Studio, Massachusetts, U.S.
- Genres: Screamo; emoviolence; powerviolence; mathcore
- Length: 16:13
- Label: Old Glory Records

Jeromes Dream chronology
Seeing Means More Than Safety (2000)	Presents (2001)

Seeing Means More Than Safety is the debut studio album by the American emo band Jeromes Dream. It was recorded from December 4 to December 5, 1999. It was released in 2000 on the record label Old Glory Records.

== Reception ==
Scott Yahtzee of Punk Planet positively reviewed the album saying that the band "[has] quite a potential for power violence clonism, but manage to get by with their own unique sound." Kent McClard, co-publisher of HeartattaCk, reviewed the album negatively, calling the singing "awful".

== Track listing ==
Seeing Means More Than Safety track listing
No.	Title	Length
1.	"A Second Grade Art Project"	2:11
2.	"And Just Like That the Year Is Gone"	1:16
3.	"Exit 29 Collapsed As I Drove By"	1:04
4.	"The Monologue of the Century"	1:46
5.	"Life Is What You Make Of It"	1:39
6.	"The Teacher Says To His Pupil"	0:59
7.	"Just Down The Hall From Room 526"	0:52
8.	"They're Always So Quick To Judge"	1:02
9.	"It's More Like A Message to You"	3:30
10.	"A Present for Those Who Are Present"	1:54
Total length:		16:13

== Personnel ==
Personnel per Bandcamp listing.

Jeromes Dream

- Jeff Smith – vocals, bass
- Nick Antonopoulos – guitar
- Eric Ratensperger – drums

Production

- Johnathan P. Herbert – recording
- Kurt Ballou – recording
- Jack Shirley - mastering (2023)
