= Conqueror (Gates of Slumber album) =

Studio album by The Gates of Slumber
- Released: May 27, 2008
- Recorded: Volume Studios, Chicago
- Genre: Doom metal
- Length: 62:20
- Label: Profound Lore Records
- Producer: Sanford Parker

The Gates of Slumber chronology
Suffer no Guilt (2006)	Conqueror (2008)	Hymns of Blood and Thunder (2009)

Conqueror is the third full-length studio album by the Indianapolis-based doom metal band The Gates of Slumber. Conqueror was listed as the #5 release of 2008 by Decibel Magazine.

== Track listing ==
- All Songs Written By The Gates Of Slumber, except where noted.
1. "Trapped In The Web" – 4:57
2. "Conqueror" – 8:15
3. "Ice Worm" – 5:19
4. "Eyes of the Liar" – 7:21
5. "Children of Satan" – 7:18
6. "To Kill and Be King" – 8:43
7. "The Machine" – 3:39
8. "The Dark Valley Suite" (The Gates Of Slumber, R. E. Howard) – 16:29

== Personnel ==
=== Band members ===
- Karl Simon: guitars, vocals, synthesizers
- Jason McCash: bass guitar, synthesizers
- "Iron" Bob Fouts: drums, percussion

=== Production ===
- Recorded, Produced, Engineered & Mixed By Sanford Parker
- Mastered By Colin Jordan
