= Nai Harvest =

British emo band

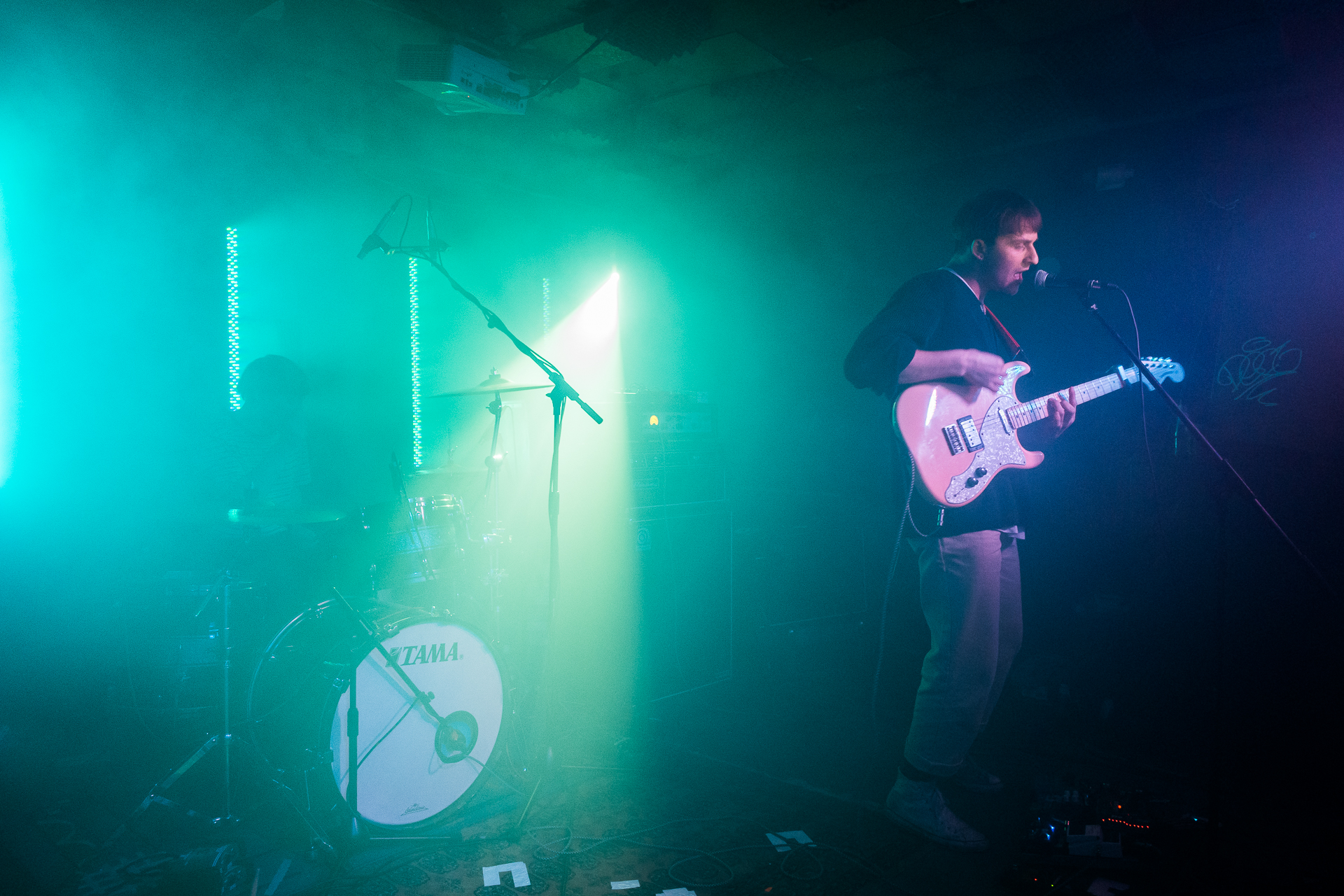

Background information
- Origin: Sheffield, South Yorkshire, U.K.
- Genres: Indie rock, emo, garage punk, noise pop
- Years active: 2011–2016
- Label: Topshelf Records
- Members: Ben Thompson; Lew Currie
- Website: www.facebook.com/naiharvestband/

Nai Harvest was a British emo band from Sheffield, United Kingdom.

== History ==
Nai Harvest began in 2011. Their name was chosen based on an interview with Saetia vocalist Billy Werner where he used the phrase "no harvest". The band released their debut full-length album in 2013 titled Whatever on Dog Knights Productions and Pinky Swear Records. The band does not view Whatever as an album, rather a collection of early songs. In 2015, Nai Harvest released their second full-length album titled Hairball on Topshelf Records.

The band has also released numerous EPs and splits, such as Feeling Better, a split with Bonjour, Invalids, and Reno Dakota, a split with Playlounge, an EP titled Hold Open My Head and A/B side singles titled Just Like You/Jelly.

In 2014, the members of Nai Harvest launched the sideproject Headroom, alongside members of the hardcore band Survival. They were amongst the earliest British bands to adopt the soft grunge genre. In 2015, they performed at Outbreak Festival.

In July 2016, Nai Harvest announced they were breaking up.

== Musical style ==
AllMusic describes Nai Harvest as "energetic noise pop with shades of emo, shoegaze, and grunge. The band's early work was heavily influenced by Mineral and American Football, characterized by "noodling" guitar work and "fragmented" song structures. The band's later releases moved towards a "heavier, poppier" style, drawing influence from shoegaze, dream pop and 1990s indie rock.

== Band members ==
- Ben Thompson – vocals, guitar
- Lew Currie – drums
