= Neil Perry (band) =

American hardcore punk band

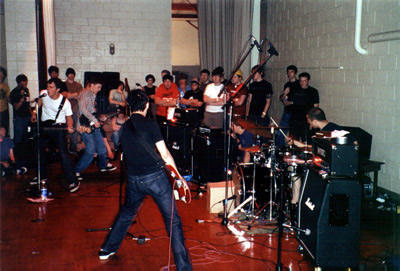
- Neil Perry.

Background information
- Origin: Freehold Township, New Jersey, United States
- Genres: Screamo; Emoviolence
- Years active: 1998–2002
- Labels: Level Plane, Robotic Empire, Witching Hour, Spiritfall
- Members: Josh Jakubowski; Chris Smith; Jon Marinari; Justin Graves

Neil Perry was an American screamo band from New Jersey, United States. Jon Marinari played bass and vocals in the influential New Jersey screamo band You and I. After they split, he and ex-members of Red All Over started Neil Perry.

Neil Perry released several records in the next four years, mostly with Level Plane records. The band broke up in 2002. In early 2003 they recorded four new songs that were their final recordings and featured on their discography Lineage Situation, released by Level Plane records in July 2003. The release contained the band's entire 40 song discography, and a second disc included a 35-minute video of tour and live footage. Some of the later material had a post-rock structure to it.

After Neil Perry, band members played in other bands such as Hot Cross, Joshua Fit For Battle, A Life Once Lost, Superstitions of the Sky, The Now, Get Fucked, and Welcome the Plague Year.

== Members ==
- Josh Jakubowski - Vocals, Guitar
- Chris Smith - Guitar, Vocals
- Jon Marinari - Vocals, Bass
- Justin Graves - Drums

== Discography ==
=== Extended plays ===
Year	Album Details	Notes
1999	Neil Perry: Released: May 22, 1999; Label: Spiritfall Records; Format: 7"	All copies issued on clear vinyl. Sometimes known as "S/T".
2001	Gettin' Our Tour On: Released: June 1, 2001; Label: Level Plane Records; Format: 7"	Tour edition blue 7" that included previously released material. However, some tracks included alternative vocal takes, making the versions on this release different. Limited to 300 copies total, 70 were available by mail order. All copies came in sleeves made from various pornography magazines and clothing catalogues with information silkscreened to the front side, and were hand numbered.
2000	Neil Perry: Released: 2002; Label: Witching Hour Records; Format: 7" Picture disc	Picture disc, sometimes called Specimen
Unknown	Young Lovers Fan Club #1: Released: Unknown; Label: Blood Of The Young Records; Format: 5"	Intended to be released as a 5" picture disc, however the project was scrapped. It was instead issued on yellow test pressings as a free special edition collector item to those who were on their mailing lists. All tracks eventually appeared on the band's split with Kaospilot.

=== Split releases ===
Year	Album Details	Notes
2000	Split LP: Released: 2000; Label: Spiritfall Records; Format: LP	Split full-length with A Satellite Crash.
2000	The Chilling Tale Of Usurp Synapse, As Told By Neil Perry: Released: May 1, 2000; Label: Level Plane Records; Format: 7"	1100 black copies, 100 copies with alternative artwork under the name Comes Around, Goes Around. Split with Usurp Synapse.
2001	Brothers From Different Mothers: Released: July 1, 2001; Label: Level Plane Records; Format: LP	First pressing consisted of 500 black copies and 500 red. The red copies had different artwork from the black. A second pressing consisting of 500 pink copies were made, and were packaged in the same art as the red copies. Split with Joshua Fit For Battle.
2002	Neil Perry/Kaospilot: Released: January 1, 2002; Label: Level Plane Records; Format: 7"	Pressed on black, yellow, and white vinyl. About 100 grey copies were made, and were available only through mail order. Split with Kaospilot.
2002	A Days Refrain/Neil Perry: Released: August 22, 2002; Label: Robotic Empire; Format: 3" CD	400 copies total, which came in various bags and jewel cases. 200 were uncut, full sized CDs with only 3" worth of music. Split with A Days Refrain.

=== Compilation albums ===
Year	Album Details	Notes
2003	Lineage Situation: Released: July 21, 2003; Label: Level Plane Records; Format: 2xCD	Discography compilation that included every song recorded by Neil Perry, excluding improvisational sessions. The album's contents were a CD and CD-ROM containing videos.

=== Compilation appearances ===
Year	Album Details	Notes
2000	Summertime: Released: 2000; Label: Kordava Milk Bar Records; Format: CD	"September 15th, City Lights And The Clouds That Sucked Them Dry"
2000	Antipodes: Released: October 2000; Label: Level Plane Records; Format: 7"	"Memoirs Of An Illiterate Penpal"
2003	Building Records Present 60 Songs: Released: 2003; Label: Building Records; Format: 2xCD	"Looking Back On The Way You Want To Be In The Future"
2001	80 Records And We're Not Broke (Yet): Released: 2005; Label: Level Plane Records; Format: 2xCD	"Nine Minutes Of Non-Fiction", "High Point Improv"
