= Greg Drudy =

American musician

- Origin: United States
- Genres: Indie rock, screamo, post-hardcore
- Instrument: Drums
- Years active: 1993–present
- Formerly of: Hot Cross; Interpol; Saetia

Greg Drudy is an American musician, primarily known for playing drums in several indie rock and screamo bands in the 1990s and 2000s.

== Career ==
Drudy started his career on drums practicing with the defunct band Quid Pro Quo in a Tampa warehouse next door to fellow warehouse owners Cannibal Corpse and Brutality. Drudy was the drummer for the bands Southpaw (with vocalist Kaleb Stewart) and Saetia, and was the original drummer for the band Interpol. He left Interpol in 2000 and was replaced by Sam Fogarino. He formerly played drums for Hot Cross and runs both Level Plane Records and Enucleation Records.

== Personal life ==
Drudy is a graduate of New York University. He is married.
