= Burn It Down (band) =

American metalcore band

- Origin: Indianapolis, Indiana, U.S.
- Genres: Metalcore
- Years active: 1997–2001, 2005
- Labels: Escape Artist, Trustkill
- Past members: Members
- Website: burnitdown.com

Burn It Down was an American metalcore band from Indianapolis, Indiana, whose album, Let the Dead Bury the Dead, was released in 2000 on Escape Artist Records. Produced by Ed Rose (The Get Up Kids, Coalesce), the album garnered a 4 "K" review in Kerrang! and a 4/5 in Alternative Press. It followed two EPs and a split CD with Racetraitor. Burn It Down toured with Shadows Fall, In Flames, Dillinger Escape Plan and Zao before disbanding. They played their final show at the 2001 Hellfest and a reunion show in 2005.

Ryan J. Downey has reported for MTV, MSNBC, Alternative Press, AllMusic and other outlets; and manages bands and producers. John Zeps owns music stores and plays in several bands. Jason McCash was in the doom metal band, The Gates Of Slumber before his death in 2014. "Iron" Brian "Bob" Fouts continued to record and tour with several bands (Apostle of Solitude, Nachtmystium) and produced / engineered, as well, until his death in 2020.

== Members ==
Final lineup

- Jason McCash – bass (1999–2001, died 2014)
- Ryan J. Downey – vocals (1997–2001)
- John Zeps – guitar (1997–2001)
- Brian "Bob" Fouts – drums (1997–2001, died 2020)

Former members

- Todd Gullion – bass (1997)
- Scott "Scoth" Datsun – drums (1997)
- John Johnson – bass (1998)
- Dan Binaei – guitar (1999)

Timeline

== Discography ==
- Let the Dead Bury the Dead (Escape Artist Records) 2000
- Make Them Talk Split-CD EP w/ Racetraitor (Trustkill Records/ Good Life) 1999
- Eat Sleep Mate Defend 10"/ CD EP (Escape Artist Records) 1998
- Burn It Down 7"/ CD EP (Uprising Records) 1997
