= Hot Cross =

American post-hardcore band

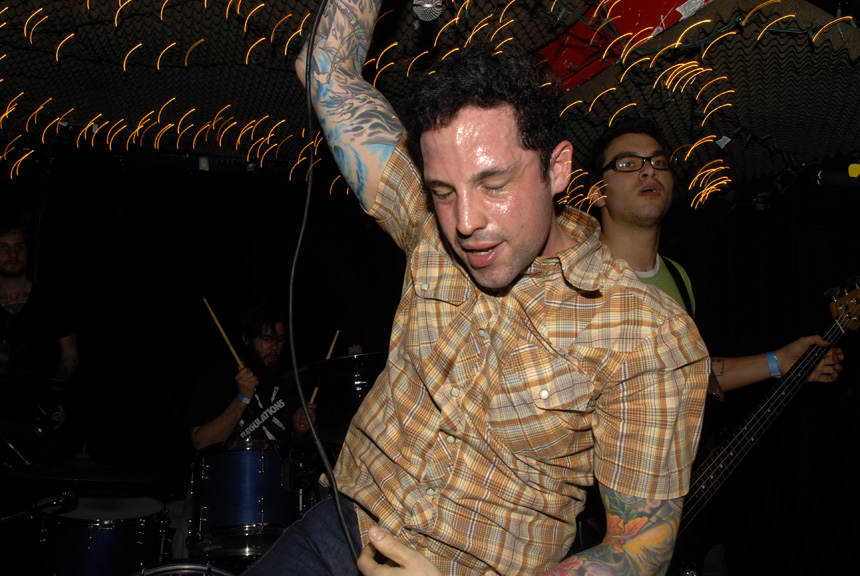
- Werner and Hot Cross at the Cake Shop in NYC

Background information
- Origin: Philadelphia, Pennsylvania, U.S.
- Genres: Post-hardcore, hardcore punk
- Years active: 2000–2007
- Labels: Level Plane, Equal Vision
- Members: Billy Werner; Greg Drudy; Matt Smith; Casey Boland; Josh Jakubowski
- Website: hotcross.bandcamp.com

Hot Cross was a post-hardcore band from Philadelphia. They were signed to Hope Division Records and Equal Vision Records. The band was composed of former members of such bands as Saetia (vocalist Billy Werner and drummer Greg Drudy, who was also a founding member and the original drummer of post-punkers Interpol), Off Minor (bassist/guitarist Matt Smith), You and I (guitarist Casey Boland), Neil Perry, The Now and Joshua fit for Battle (bassist/guitarist Josh Jakubowski).

== Style ==
Their songs are composed of intricate (and in the beginning of their career, dueling) guitars heavily influenced by Drive Like Jehu. They initially signed with Level Plane in 2003.

== History ==
Hot Cross formed in 2000. They released their debut EP A New Set of Lungs in 2001. They released their debut album Cryonics in 2003. They released their second full-length album Risk Revival in 2007. They released their second EP Fair Trades & Farewells in 2004.

On May 2, 2006, Hot Cross announced that they had signed to Hope Division/Equal Vision Records and would be releasing their next full length on this label.

On August 10, 2006, the band announced on their website that they would be re-recording their CD originally recorded by Mike Hill. The album was recorded by former Hot Cross member Josh Jakubowski.

On July 7, 2007, the band announced on their MySpace that they were "indefinitely inactive," effectively ending their 7 years together and cutting their 2007 tour short.

Bassist Matt Smith is currently involved with a project called Halo of Snakes. They are scheduled to release a record on Harvcore. Casey Boland and Josh Jakubowski began a new project called Vista Rhymes. Their first album VR:1 was made available via streaming in 2022.

== Members ==
- Billy Werner – lead vocals
- Josh Jakubowski – guitar, vocals
- Casey Boland – guitar, vocals
- Matt Smith – bass
- Greg Drudy – drums

== Discography ==
=== Studio albums ===
- Cryonics (2003)
- Risk Revival (2007)

=== EPs ===
- A New Set of Lungs (2001)
- Fair Trades & Farewells (2004)

=== Splits ===
- Split with Light the Fuse and Run (2003) (Songs: 1. "The Eye Is A Tricky Machine", 2. "In Memory Of Movern")
- Split with Lickgoldensky (2004) (Songs: 1. "A Voice Turned Vacant", 2. "Patience And Prudence")
- Split with The Holy Shroud (2005) (Songs: 1. "Tacoma")
