= A Day in Black and White (band) =

- Origin: Washington, DC, USA
- Genres: Alternative rock Screamo; Indie rock Post-hardcore
- Years active: 2001-2005
- Label: Level Plane
- Members: Daniel Morse; Ian Thompson; Mike Petillo; Aaron Leitko
- Past members: Steven Green
- Website: www.dayinblackandwhite.com

A Day in Black and White are a band based in Washington, DC who formed in 2001. They have been described as post-punk, post-hardcore, experimental/indie rock and even post-emo. Their sound has been compared to bands such as City of Caterpillar, Sonic Youth and Fugazi. They are currently signed to Level Plane Records.

== Discography ==
=== Albums ===
- My Heroes Have Always Killed Cowboys (2004)
- Notes (Level Plane Records, 2005)

=== Split Releases ===
- Split w/ Silent Reminder (2003)
- Split w/ Black Castle (2004)
- Split w/ Navies (2005)
- Split w/ Golden Birds (2005)

== Members ==
- Daniel Morse: guitar, vocals, bass
- Ian Thompson: drums
- Mike Petillo: bass
- Aaron Leitko: guitar
