= Saetia =

American hardcore punk band

- Origin: New York City, New York, United States
- Genres: Screamo; hardcore punk; post-hardcore
- Years active: 1997–1999; 2022–present
- Labels: Secret Voice; Level Plane; Witching Hour; The Mountain Collective for Independent Artists
- Spinoffs: Off Minor
- Members: Billy Werner; Adam Marino; Colin Bartoldus; Steve Roche; Tom Schlatter
- Past members: Greg Drudy; Matt Smith; Alex Madara; Jamie Behar

Saetia (/ˈseɪʃə/ SAY-shə) is a New York City-based screamo band. While relatively unknown during their initial existence, the band is now seen as one of the most critically lauded bands of the late-1990s screamo scene.

== History ==
=== 1997–1999: Formation, Saetia and breakup ===
Saetia initially formed in February 1997 when each of its members were attending New York University. Their name originates from a misspelling of the Miles Davis track "Saeta", from his album Sketches of Spain. The band had numerous members throughout its existence, with frequent changes in membership. The band's first bass player, Alex Madara, was affected by a severe allergic reaction which placed him into a coma for eight days, finally resulting in his death on December 14, 1998.

Their drummer, Greg Drudy, was the original drummer of the band Interpol prior to their current popularity. He operated the record label Level Plane, which was initially started so Saetia could release a 7-inch single to sell at shows. Other members of the band continued their musical careers in numerous outfits, some of them joining screamo bands such as Off Minor, Hot Cross and The Fiction, as well as the bands Errortype: Eleven and Instruction.

The group would eventually break up in October 1999. Saetia's final, posthumous single, "Eronel" (also a title of a Thelonious Monk composition) was released under the Witching Hour label in 2000. The single contains three songs recorded by Steve Roche and mixed by Pat Kenneally. In 2001, Level Plane issued A Retrospective, a discography album that compiles every recording the band has made, including recordings taken from one of the last shows the band played at ABC No Rio.

=== 2016: Posthumous releases ===
In 2016, Secret Voice, the label of Touché Amoré vocalist Jeremy Bolm, released Collected, a two-disc, 180-gram vinyl set that includes every studio recording by the group. The tracks from ABC No Rio also saw their own release in the form of a cassette titled Live At ABC No Rio Spring 1999, which was also released in 2016 through Secret Voice.

=== 2022-present: Reunion ===
In April 2022, Saetia, consisting of Billy Werner, Jamie Behar, Adam Marino, Colin Bartoldus, and Chris Enriquez (drummer of Spotlights, Julie Christmas and On the Might of Princes), announced via Instagram that they rehearsed for the first time in 24 years. In August 2022, the band parted ways with guitarist Jamie Behar over abuse allegations, which Behar described as "mean texts and snide remarks. No physical violence." In November 2022, they brought back Steve Roche (on drums) and new member, Tom Schlatter (on guitar) and played live at four locations in New York and Pennsylvania.

On January 3, 2025, Saetia released its first new music in over 26 years. The first release was track "Tendrils", which was the first of the three tracks from theTendrils EP, released in March.

On October 25, 2025, Saetia announced the prompt removal of their discography from Spotify, stating that the platform "does not at all align with the band’s values or ethos." The band cited concerns regarding Spotify's ICE recruitment advertisements, low artist compensation, and the subsidization of controversial content as primary reasons for the departure.

== Style and legacy ==
According to Kerrang, Saetia "revel[ed] in melodrama to a new extreme" by taking "what emo was and dialled the aggression all the way up." He said of the band's self titled album: "Instrumentally, this is a work of total fucking chaos." He said that the screaming of Billy Werner is "sharp enough to cause lacerations."

Saetia have cited numerous bands as influences, including Born Against, Rorschach, 1.6 Band, Heroin, Antioch Arrow, Los Crudos, Anasarca, Merel, Sleepytime Trio, Downcast, Shotmaker, Maximillian Colby and Closure, as well as many of the bands on Bloodlink Records and Ebullition Records.

Stewart Mason of AllMusic described their music as an "essential document" for fans of screamo. The band's influence has been noted in the work of La Dispute. They have been cited as an influence by Alexisonfire, Senses Fail, Thursday and Touché Amoré. Nai Harvest's name is a reference to Saetia.

== Band members ==
Current

- Billy Werner – vocals (1997–1999, 2022–present) – vocals on all
- Adam Marino – guitars, vocals (1997–1999, 2022–present) – guitar on Demo, Saetia 7", Saetia LP/CD
- Colin Bartoldus - bass, vocals (1997–1999, 2022–present) – bass on Saetia LP/CD, guitar on Eronel 7"
- Steve Roche – bass (1999), guitar (1999), drums (2022–present) – bass on Eronel 7", guitar at final live performance before disbandment, drums for reunion
- Tom Schlatter – guitars, vocals (2022–present) – guitar for reunion

Former

- Greg Drudy - drums (1997–1999) – drums on all
- Jamie Behar – guitar (1997–1999, 2022) – guitar on all
- Alex Madara – bass (1997; died 1998) – bass on Demo, Saetia 7"
- Matt Smith – bass (1999) – bass at final live performance before disbandment

== Discography ==
=== Studio albums ===
| Year | Album Details | Notes |
|---|---|---|
| 1998 | Saetia: Released: 1998; Label: The Mountain Collective of Independent Artists; Format: LP, CD | 1,000 CD copies pressed, 1,000 LP copies pressed. 800 LPs were packaged in "standard" sleeves, 100 were packaged in the same sleeve but with the colors inverted, and 100 were tour editions that came in sleeves similar to the CD edition. |

=== Singles and EPs ===
| Year | Album Details | Notes |
|---|---|---|
| 1997 | Demo: Released: 1997; Label: Self-released; Format: CS | Includes two tracks (Venus and Bacchus, One Dying Wish) that would later re-appear on the band's 1997 self-titled 7". |
| 1997 | Saetia: Released: 1997; Label: Level Plane; Format: 7" | 1,000 copies pressed, multiple different sleeve variations exist |
| 1999 | Eronel: Released: 1999; Label: Witching Hour; Format: 7" | 1,000 copies packaged in standard sleeves, 100 hand-numbered copies packaged in a "paperback" manilla envelope, 10 hand-numbered copies packaged in a manila envelope with a picture of the band stuck on it, and 25 copies packaged in special "gravestone" sleeves that were sold as part of the Witching Hour Subscription Series. |
| 2025 | Tendrils EP: Released: March 7, 2025; Label: Self-released; Format: Digital, 12" | First new music in 26 years. First single Tendrils was released on January 3, 2025. |

=== Live Albums ===
| Year | Album Details | Notes |
|---|---|---|
| 2016 | Live At ABC No Rio Spring 1999: Released: January 12, 2016; Label: Secret Voice; Format: CS | Features tracks previously released on A Retrospective. Unknown number of copies pressed, all copies purple. |
| 2023 | LIVE FROM SAINT VITUS BAR: Released: December 1, 2023; Label: Self-released; Format: Digital | Recorded live at Saint Vitus November 2022, part of the reunion weekend of shows |

=== Compilation albums ===
| Year | Album Details | Notes |
|---|---|---|
| 2001 | A Retrospective: Released: October 2001; Label: Level Plane; Format: CD | Features entire recorded discography and live tracks recorded at a show at ABC No Rio in the spring of 1999 |
| 2016 | Collected: Released: July 15, 2016; Label: Secret Voice; Format: 2xLP | Pressed on 180-gram black vinyl. Includes the band's entire studio discography |
