= The Gates of Slumber =

American doom metal band

- Also known as: The Keep (1997–1998)
- Origin: Indianapolis, Indiana, U.S.
- Genres: Doom metal, heavy metal
- Years active: 1997–2013, 2019–present
- Label: Rise Above
- Members: Karl Simon; Chuck Brown; Steve Janiak
- Past members: Dr. Phibes; Jamie Walters; Brad Elliott; Chris Gordon; Jason McCash; Bob Fouts; J "Cool" Clyde Paradis

The Gates of Slumber is an American doom metal band from Indianapolis, Indiana. The group is better known in Germany and England than in their native United States. Their first release distributed within the U.S. was 2008's Conqueror, released on Profound Lore Records.

== History ==
=== First era (1997–2013) ===
The band was formed by Karl Simon in 1997 as The Keep, with himself on vocals and bass, Jason McCash on guitar, and Chuck Brown on drums. The band released two demos, then McCash and Brown left in 1999. Simon switched to guitar, and renamed the band The Gates of Slumber. In 2000, he recruited bassist Dr. Phibes and drummer Jamie Walters. However, personality and commitment clashes led to Phibes and Walters leaving the band, leaving Simon to bring in Brad Elliott and Chris "The Fist" Gordon as replacements. This lineup was also short-lived, and the original lineup of Jason McCash and Chuck Brown replaced Elliot and Gordon on bass and drums, respectively, in 2003.

This lineup lasted until 2005 when conflicts between Brown and the rest of the band led to his departure. After being briefly replaced by a returning Gordon, the position of drummer fell to "Iron" Bob Fouts. This lineup lasted for five years, between 2005 and 2010, the longest-lasting lineup in the band's history. In 2010, Fouts was replaced by Jerry "Cool" Clyde Paradis, a band member for two years until he was replaced by the returning Fouts in 2012. Longtime member Jason McCash left the band in September 2013, and Simon and Fouts decided to dissolve the band shortly thereafter, in September 2013.

=== Deaths and reformation (2014–present) ===
It was announced by Karl Simon that Jason McCash had died on April 5, 2014, at age 37 from a heroin overdose, and that as a consequence of this, he would never reform The Gates of Slumber. However, in April 2019, Simon reformed the band, with original drummer Chuck Brown, and new bassist Steve Janiak.

The Gates of Slumber released a new, self-titled album in November 2024 via Svart Records.

Jerry Clyde Paradis died in 2016 from heat stroke. He was 46 years old. Bob Fouts died on April 28, 2020, at age 45. No cause of death was revealed.

== Band members ==
Current

- Karl Simon – vocals (1997–2013), bass (1997–1999), guitar (2000–2013, 2019–present)
- Chuck Brown – drums (1997–1999, 2003–2004, 2019-present)
- Steve Janiak – bass (2019–present)

Former

- Dr. Phibes – bass (2000–2002)
- Jamie Walters – drums (2000–2002)
- Brad Elliott – bass (2002–2003)
- Chris Gordon – drums (2002–2003)
- Jason McCash – guitar (1997–1999), bass (2003–2013; died 2014)
- Bob Fouts – drums (2005–2010, 2012–2013; died 2020)
- Jerry Clyde Paradis – drums (2010–2012; died 2016)

Timeline

== Discography ==
Studio albums

- ...The Awakening, 2004 (Final Chapter)
- Suffer no Guilt, 2006 (I Hate Records)
- Conqueror, 2008 (I Hate Records / Profound Lore)
- Hymns of Blood and Thunder, 2009 (Rise Above Records)
- The Wretch, 2011 (Rise Above Records)
- The Gates of Slumber, 2024 (Svart Records)

EPs

- Like a Plague upon the Land (2005; Hellride Music)
- God Wills It (2006; Slumbering Souls records)
- The Ice Worm's Lair (2008)
- The Hyena Sessions (2010)
- Stormcrow (2013)

Singles

- The Jury (2011)

Compilations

- Villain, Villain 2LP compilation, 2007 (Metal Supremacy)
- Chronicles of True Doom 4LP compilation, 2009 (Iron Kodex Records)

Splits

- The Gates of Slumber / The Dream is Dead split EP, 2007 (Relapse Records)
- From Ultima Thule Split CD with Spiritus Mortis 2007 (Emissary Records)
- The Gates of Slumber / Crowning Glory Split 7" 2008 (Rise Above Records)

Demos

- Blood Encrusted Deth Axe demo, 2000
- Sabbath Witch demo, 2002
- The Cloaked Figure demo, 2004

Compilation appearances

- Chariots Arrive Again Vol.2 Comp, 2004 (Foreshadow Productions)
- A Dark World Comp, 2004 (Final Chapter)
- CM Disro Sampler 2004 Comp, 2004 (Century Media)
- Constant Migraine Comp CD 2007 (Constant Migraine Records)

== Sources ==
- The Gates of Slumber – God Wills It, Slumbering Souls – 01 – 2005 (Red Vinyl – LP.) (German)
