= Portraits of Past =

American hardcore punk band

- Origin: San Francisco, California, U.S.
- Genres: Post-hardcore; hardcore punk; screamo; emo
- Years active: 1993–1995, 2008–2009, 2025 (reunion)
- Labels: Ebullition Records; Positively Punk Records; Excursions into the Abyss
- Past members: Robert Pettersen; Jonah Buffa; Rex John Shelverton; Matthew Martin Bajda; Aaron Lee Schlieve; Jeremy Bringetto; Daniel Fenton
- Website: Official Website

Portraits of Past is an American post-hardcore band from the San Francisco Bay Area that originally existed roughly from 1994 to 1995. Inspired by such bands as Heroin, Unwound, and Drive Like Jehu as well as powerviolence music, Portraits of Past has been credited with helping create the "screamo" genre, though that term was not used at the time the band was active. As Kent McClard recounts on the Ebullition Records website, the band's popularity grew only a couple of years after their demise at the end of 1995.

Former members of the band later formed other projects such as Nexus Six, Seventeen Queen, The Audience, Funeral Diner, Vue, Bellavista and ...Who Calls So Loud.

Portraits of Past played a number of reunion shows in the second half of 2008. A new song was played at two California and two New York shows. Of the new song, lead vocalist Rob Pettersen has said, "We are not sure if other songs will be written or how/if we will release it/them. Nothing is ruled out, however… "

New material did eventually surface on an EP, Cypress Dust Witch, which was released by Excursions Into The Abyss on October 20, 2009.

In 2025, Portraits of Past announced reunion shows in California, stating that shows on the East Coast are a possibility. They also reissued their eponymous album shortly after announcing the reunion.

== Members ==
- Robert Pettersen – vocals
- Jonah Buffa – guitar
- Rex John Shelverton – guitar, vocals
- Jeremy Bringetto – bass
- Matthew Martin Bajda – drums

== Discography ==
=== Studio albums ===
- Portraits of Past (1996, Ebullition) – AKA 0101010

=== Compilation albums ===
- Portraits of Past (2008, Ebullition) – discography CD

=== Singles/EPs ===
- Demo Tape (1993, Self-released)
- Portraits of Past / Bleed (1994, Ebullition) – split 7" with Bleed
- Cypress Dust Witch (2009, Excursions into the Abyss) – CD/12"
- Early Tracks (2025)
- Portraits Of Past / Saetia (2026, Solid Brass, What Was Behind) 7"

=== Compilation appearances ===
- XXX: Some Ideas Are Poisonous (1995, Ebullition) – "Sticks Together"
- Stealing The Pocket (1995, Positively Punk) – "The Song with the Slow Part"
