= Racebannon =

American noise punk band

- Also known as: RCBNNN
- Origin: Indianapolis, Indiana, USA
- Genres: Noise punk, avant-garde metal, post-hardcore
- Years active: 1996–2012
- Labels: Joyful Noise Recordings, Tizona Records, Southern Records, Secretly Canadian, Level Plane Records, Witching Hour
- Members: Mike Anderson; James Bauman; Brad Williams; Chris "Sal" Saligoe
- Past members: Ian Pedersen; Kaiton Slusher; Karl Hoffstetter; Alex T. Mann; Dave Britts; Michael Anderson; Nate Spainhower; Mike Bell

Racebannon was an American noise punk band from Bloomington, Indiana. The band formed in September 1996, citing influences ranging from Antioch Arrow to the Melvins and stating that they were heavily influenced by hardcore, hip-hop, heavy metal, jazz, and the blues. The band's sound is noted for being odd and experimental, and the group has been dubbed as "noise rock" or "noise metal" by critics. Since their formation, the band has released numerous albums, extended plays, and splits through a variety of labels, such as Secretly Canadian and Level Plane.

== History ==
Racebannon was formed in Indianapolis in 1996 by Michael Anderson and James Bauman. The group cites The Melvins, Melt Banana, and Ice Nine as early influences. They cobbled together a lineup from members of other Indianapolis hardcore punk bands and released their first 7-inch record in 1998. Many other 7-inches, split 7-inches, and compilation appearances followed, as well as the band's debut album, First There Was The Emptiness. The group's name comes from Dr. Quest's bodyguard in the Jonny Quest franchise. Among the group's unusual sonic attributes is the use of DJ scratching, but as a conduit for noise rather than a rhythmic accompaniment (as in hip hop). After moving to Bloomington, Indiana, they signed with Secretly Canadian, who released their full-length In the Grips of the Light. The album was recorded with Mike Mogis of Lullaby for the Working Class, and resulted in their winning praise from Alternative Press. 2002's Satan's Kickin' Yr Dick In, was a concept album revolving around a Faustian bargain and was also produced by Mogis. Over the course of the album (sometimes considered a rock opera), the protagonist, Rodney, sells his soul to Satan in exchange for the chance to become a drag queen rock star. The group performed at SXSW in 2003. Acid or Blood, appeared in 2008 on Southern Records. Another album, entitled Six Sik Sisters was released through Tizona Records in 2011.

== Members ==
Members

- Mike Anderson - vocals (1996–2012)
- James Bauman - guitar (1996–2012)
- Alex T. Mann - bass (2011–2012)
- Karl Hoffstetter - drums (2011–2012)

Previous members

- Kaiton Slusher - bass (1996–1997)
- Chris "Sal" Saligoe - bass (1997–2011)
- Ian Pedersen - drums (1996–1997)
- Brad Williams - drums (1997–2011)
- Chris Williams - vocals (1998)
- Nate Spainhower - tapes & tables (2000–2001)
- Mike Bell (2001–2006)
- Dave Britts - noise DJ (2003)
- Michael Anderson - noise (2003)

== Discography ==
Studio albums

- First There Was the Emptiness (2000, Level Plane)
- In the Grips of the Light (2002, Secretly Canadian)
- Satan's Kickin' Yr Dick In (2002, Secretly Canadian)
- IV: Acid or Blood (2008, Tizona)
- Six Sik Sisters (2011, Tizona)

Extended plays

- Racebannon Is the Most Complete Volume of the Motion of the Planets (1998, Witching Hour)
- Master Control Program (1998, The Great Vitamin Mystery)
- Clubber Lang (2002, Alone)
- Merzbannon (2009, Tizona)
- Wrap the Body (2010, Joyful Noise)
- Unwanted Sounds (2012, Auris Apothecary)

Splits

- split 7-inch with To Dream of Autumn (1998, Witching Hour/Troufion)
- split 7-inch with Knives and Greenwater (1998, Witching Hour)
- split 7-inch with The Disease (2001, Monotonstudio)
- split 7-inch with Zann and Anger Is Beautiful (2001, Modus Operandi/Adiago830)
- split 6" with Mara'akate (2001, Electric Human Project)
- Near and Far Volume 2 split CD/LP with Song of Zarathustra (2003, Level Plane/Backroad)
- Insound Tour Support Series No. 25 split CD with Helen of Trpy (2003, Insound)
- split 7-inch with Majhas (2005, Happy Couples Never Last)

Compilation albums

- [The Inevitable] Singles and Rarities 1997-2005 (2005, Alone)

Remix albums

- Remixed, Reinterpreted and Reconsidered (2013, self-released)
