= Level Plane Records =

American record label

- Founded: 1997
- Founder: Greg Drudy
- Defunct: 2009
- Genre: Screamo, hardcore punk, post-hardcore, indie rock
- Country of origin: U.S.
- Location: New York City
- Official website: level-plane.com

Level Plane was an American independent record label based in New York City that was founded in early 1997 by Greg Drudy for the release of Saetia's first 7". Drudy ran the label until it ceased to exist in 2009. It released records in a variety of styles including those by many screamo bands.

== Roster ==
- A Day in Black and White
- Air Conditioning
- Amanda Woodward
- Anodyne
- Aussitôt Mort
- Bloody Panda
- Books Lie
- Bright Calm Blue
- Bucket Full of Teeth
- City of Caterpillar
- Coliseum
- The Conversions
- Defeatist
- Drain the Sky
- Envy
- The Fiction
- Forstella Ford
- Get Fucked
- Get Rad
- Gospel
- Graf Orlock
- The Hidden Chord
- The Holy Shroud
- Hot Cross
- Jeromes Dream
- Kaospilot
- Landmine Marathon
- Lickgoldensky
- Life at These Speeds
- Life Detecting Coffins
- Light the Fuse and Run
- Louise Cyphre
- Malady
- Melt-Banana
- Mikoto
- The Minor Times
- Muslimgauze
- Neil Perry
- Newgenics
- North of America
- The Now
- Oil
- The One AM Radio
- pg. 99
- Ruhaeda
- Racebannon
- Saetia
- Saviours
- Shikari
- Sinaloa
- The State Secedes
- Thou
- Tombs
- Transistor Transistor
- A Trillion Barnacle Lapse
- Usurp Synapse
- Van Johnson
- the Vidablue
- Warwolf
- You and I

== See also ==
- List of record labels
- Category:Level Plane Records albums
