= Portrayal of Guilt =

American black metal band

- Origin: Austin, Texas, U.S.
- Genres: Black metal; grindcore; powerviolence; screamo
- Years active: 2017–present
- Labels: Run for Cover; Holy Roar; Closed Casket Activities; Gilead Media
- Members: Matt King; James Beveridge; Alex Stanfield
- Past members: Blake Given; Rick Flores
- Website: portrayalofguilt.com

Portrayal of Guilt is an American black metal/hardcore band formed in Austin, Texas, in 2017. It was founded by guitarist/vocalist Matt King, bassist Blake Given, and drummer James Beveridge.

== History ==
Portrayal of Guilt formed when guitarist and vocalist Matt King and drummer James Beveridge – members of Austin hardcore band Illustrations – joined forces with bassist Blake Given of Austin screamo outfit Lyed. The trio released their self-titled EP in May 2017, and toured extensively across the United States and Europe with Centuries, Majority Rule, Planning for Burial, Street Sects, and Slow Fire Pistol.

In March 2018, they released a split EP with industrial hardcore band Street Sects, who they had previously toured with, to critical acclaim. In this same month, Deathwish Inc. reissued their self-titled 7".

In July 2018, just before embarking on a full U.S. tour with French post-hardcore stalwarts Birds in Row, the band released a single-sided 5" single containing the song "Chamber of Misery (Pt. 1)" as the beginning of a campaign to support first their full-length, studio album. The album's name, Let Pain Be Your Guide, was announced on September 6 of the same year, along with the premiere of the single "A Burden." On October 1, they premiered the second single from the album, "Your War," which featured vocals from Dylan Walker of Full of Hell. On October 24 they released the last single from the record, "Among Friends." On November 12, the full album was made available to listen to via NPR. The album features artwork by Chris Taylor of Pg. 99 and Pygmy Lush, as well as additional vocals from Maha Shami of NØ MAN and Matt Michel of Majority Rule. On November 18, Let Pain Be Your Guide was released in full, largely to critical acclaim.

In February 2019, Portrayal of Guilt was featured in The Washington Post, along with contemporaries Vein and Infant Island, as delivering "new life" to screamo.

In 2019, Portrayal of Guilt continued touring in support of their full length, opening for Pg. 99, Majority Rule, The HIRS Collective, and Wrong. They also headlined a full U.S. tour with support from Fluoride, NØ MAN, and Stay Asleep. In February 2019 it was announced that the band would be opening for Skeletonwitch on a number of dates across the American South.

When the COVID-19 pandemic forced an end to their touring in March 2020, the band returned to Austin and began working on their second LP, We Are Always Alone. The album features nine tracks recorded with producer Phillip Odom and mastered by Will Yip. Vocal performances from Matt Michel and Chris Taylor of Majorityrule and Pg. 99 appear on Garden of Despair and The Second Coming, respectively. On January 29, 2021, the album was released on Closed Casket Activities, a Troy, New York based metal label.

== Musical style ==
Portrayal of Guilt's musical style has been described as screamo since the band's inception as the band openly draws from older bands in the genre like Pg.99 and City of Caterpillar – even enlisting Matt Michel, the frontman of Majority Rule to record, mix, and produce their first record, Let Pain Be Your Guide. They have been compared to the bands Converge and Oathbreaker, and termed "blackened screamo."

== Band members ==
Current members

- Matt King – vocals, guitar (2017–present)
- Alex Stanfield – bass (2019–present)
- James Beveridge – drums (2017–present)

Past members

- Blake Given – bass (2017–2019)
- Rick Flores – electronics, sampling (2017–2019)

== Discography ==
=== Studio albums ===
Title	Album details
Let Pain Be Your Guide	Released: November 16, 2018; Labels: Holy Roar, Gilead Media, Through Love; Formats: DL, 12", CS
We Are Always Alone	Released: January 29, 2021; Label: Closed Casket Activities; Formats: DL, 12", CD
Christfucker	Released: November 5, 2021; Label: Run for Cover; Formats: DL, 12", CD, CS
Devil Music	Released: April 20, 2023; Label: Run for Cover; Formats: DL, 12"
...Beginning of the End	Released: April 24, 2026; Label: Run for Cover; Formats: DL, CD, 12"

=== Extended plays ===
Title	EP details	Notes
S/T	Released: May 2, 2017; Labels: Contrition Recordings, (We Built the World and) Miss the Stars Records, Blacksmith's Blood Ltd.; Formats: DL, 7", CS	
Portrayal of Guilt/Street Sects	Released: March 2, 2018; Labels: Hand of Death, Isolation Records; Formats: DL, 7", CS	Split with Street Sects
Suffering is a Gift	Released: August 30, 2019; Labels: Closed Casket Activities; Formats: DL, 12", CS	
Portrayal of Guilt / Soft Kill Split	Released: December 4, 2019; Labels: Closed Casket Activities; Formats: DL, 7", CS	Split with Soft Kill
Portrayal of Guilt / Slow Fire Pistol Split	Released: February 18, 2020; Labels: Run for Cover Records; Formats: DL, 7"	Split with Slow Fire Pistol
Portrayal of Guilt / Chat Pile	Released: August 17, 2021; Formats: DL, 7"	Split with Chat Pile

=== Singles ===
Title	Single details	Comments
"Spiritual Cramp"	Released: October 31, 2017; Label: Sore Ear Collective; Formats: DL, 7" lathe	Cover of the Christian Death song. Also released as a bonus track on the Blacksmith's Blood Ltd. issue of the S/T cassette.
"Chamber of Misery (Pt. I)"	Released: July 17, 2018; Labels: self-released; Formats: DL, 5" Lathe	Non-album single.
"Chamber of Misery (Pt. III)"	Released: December 2021; Labels: Decibel; Formats: Flexi	
