= Exotic Fever Records =

- Founded: 2000
- Founder: Bonnie Schlegel
- Status: Active
- Distributors: Dischord; Stickfigure iTunes eMusic
- Genre: Punk, alt rock, emo, screamo, hardcore punk, post hardcore
- Country of origin: U.S.
- Location: South Philadelphia, Pennsylvania
- Official website: www.exoticfever.com

Exotic Fever Records is an independent record label founded by Katy Otto, Bonnie Schlegel, and Sara Klemm in 2000 in the Washington, DC metropolitan area. Schlegel, formerly of the band Bald Rapunzel, enlisted the help of drummer Katy Otto in running the label, along with Sara Klemm, Katy's then roommate. Currently operated by Otto in Philadelphia, bands have included The Shondes, Pygmylush, and 1905, which released their only album on the label. To date, the label has issued over 80 releases, including an array of benefit compilations such as Keep Singing! A Benefit Compilation for Compassion Over Killing.

== History ==
Exotic Fever Records was founded in 2000 by Bonnie Schlegel, a punk musician living in Washington, DC. Then a member of Bald Rapunzel (Dischord Records) and living in the Luzon House with other musicians, she was encouraged by bandmate Clark Sabine to form the label to release music from his band The Halo Project. Schlegel chose the name to project the idea that the label was home to "rare and infectious music," and started with a small catalog of records she was interested in, releasing "100 CDR copies each with cute packaging. It wasn’t very serious."

An indie punk and queercore band from Brooklyn, The Shondes have released music on the label. Like many artists on the label their music is politically active.

She soon recruited the drummer of Bald Rapunzel, Katy Otto, to join in managing to the label. They funded early releases with their personal work savings.

At the time Otto was roommates with Sara Klemm, who was organizing a compilation CD to benefit the DC Books to Prisons chapter she'd founded. The ensuing Literacy and Justice For All was the label's third release and first compilation. It included a zine with essays and prisoners' artwork, and proceeds from the album and live shows benefited DC Books to Prisons.

According to Klemm, "at least in the late '90s and early aughts, the D.C. music community was pretty special in how...it supported other non-music related projects. [The D.C. Area Books to Prisons Project] really benefited from the tremendous support we got from the DIY musicians in the city—both in terms of encouragement and financial support from benefit shows."

"Fall"
Sample of the 2004 track "Fall" off Voice by the band 1905, illustrating their at-times screamed vocals and political lyrics

"Woman"
Sample of the slower and less-frantic "Woman" by Animals of Ambivalence, who released a concept EP on the label in 2012.

The label released the singular recording of influential DC band 1905 in 2004, which went on to be one of their best-selling releases. More releases and compilations followed.

Bonnie Schlegel left the label not long after its inception, moving to Vermont to raise her daughter and work on her solo project, Edie Moss. Back in DC, Otto brought Sara Klemm in to help with the label. While not a musician, Klemm regularly worked with musicians for charity work. Klemm and Otto and became partners at the label, with Otto later taking over as they relocated to South Philadelphia.

In 2009 the label released a split LP between Washington, DC's Turboslut and Pygmy Lush, and the next year partnered with The Shondes to release Searchlights, the band's third full length. In 2011, the label released Improvised Weapons by the Baltimore band War on Women, as well as a concept EP The Animals of Ambivalence. In 2013, Exotic Fever released the self-titled debut of from Berlin The Dropout Patrol. A host of other releases continued, both in physical and in digital format. In 2013, The Shondes released The Garden, their second venture on the label. They followed this up in 2016 with Brighton, and a digital version of Brighton B-sides.

In 2016, Exotic Fever Records released a double LP from Ghastly City Sleep, featuring ex-members of City of Caterpillar, entitled Lulling Skulls. In this year, the label also released a split LP with RedRumsey (Vern Rumsey from Unwound in a solo endeavor/project, and Teach Me Equals.

In March 2017, it was announced that the label would be releasing new projects in the summer from Cool Moon (ex-Del Cielo) and Fine Motor. In 2020, the label also announced the addition of Rainbow Crimes, Otto's new band with Leah Basarab and Alex Smith. Also in 2020, the label celebrated its 20th anniversary with a virtual concert featuring Exotic Fever Records' artists raising money for Black and Brown Workers Cooperative. In 2021, the label also held a virtual showcase organized with Cool Moon's Andrea Lisi to raise money for The Tea Fund in response to attacks on access to safe and legal abortion in Texas, where Lisi lives.

In 2020, in the midst of the coronovirus pandemic, Exotic Fever Records moved its planned twentieth anniversary showcase from an in person event to a virtual showcase. It streamed live and was later shared on Youtube. Additionally, the label offered tote bags and t-shirts to commemorate twenty years, along with the debut of a brand new logo. In 2025, the label held two 25th anniversary celebrations - one in DC and one in Philly, the two respective homes the label has had. Since the 25th is the silver anniversary, the label created silk-screened posters, totes and shirts in silver on black.

== Activism ==
Seminal D.C. punk and post-hardcore label Dischord Records handled early distribution, and their politically active nature was a significant influence on the label itself, as were DeSoto Records and SimpleMachines. Other early mentors and associates of the label included Brian Lowit of Lovitt Records, and according to Otto, "I will remain endlessly inspired till I die by the political and cultural work Fugazi did. They definitely changed my life and I attribute a lot of what I do today to the effect they had on me as a younger girl going to shows."

The label continues to focus on artists interested in social change and community, and is active politically. As part of their work with Positive Force DC, the label was also involved in the project All Our Power, a three-day gathering concerned with connecting punk and activism. Through fundraising through compilations and other means, as of 2013 it supports groups such as:

- AMP (All Ages Movement Project)
- Compassion Over Killing
- DC Books to Prisons Project
- District Alliance for Safe Housing
- Helping Individual Prostitutes Survive
- Men Can Stop Rape
- Positive Force DC
- Provisions Library
- Vietnam Veterans of America

=== Benefit compilations ===
As of 2013 the label has released five compilations albums benefiting Vietnam Veterans of America, Helping Individual Prostitutes Survive, District Alliance for Safe Housing, the non-profit animal rights advocacy group Compassion Over Killing, and DC Books to Prisons.

On January 29, 2008, the label released Keep Singing! A Benefit Compilation for Compassion Over Killing. Genres on the compilation included Indie rock, alternative rock, emo, screamo, hardcore punk, punk, and post hardcore. The CD booklet contained vegetarian recipes submitted by the artists, and advertisements for small, ethical companies.

Keep Singing! was positively received, and according to a review: "Ranging from warm acoustic ballads to intense punk rock chops, each musician sings intelligent lyrics from the heart. There is no mistaking the messages of compassion and animal rights in this album. Keep Singing! offers a breath of fresh air to thinking people sadly wandering amidst vapid pop star-worship and destruction of the planet’s resources."

A 2013 compilation of The Others discography benefited To Write Love on Her Arms, a suicide-prevention non-profit that is primarily supported though bands and musicians.

== Artists ==
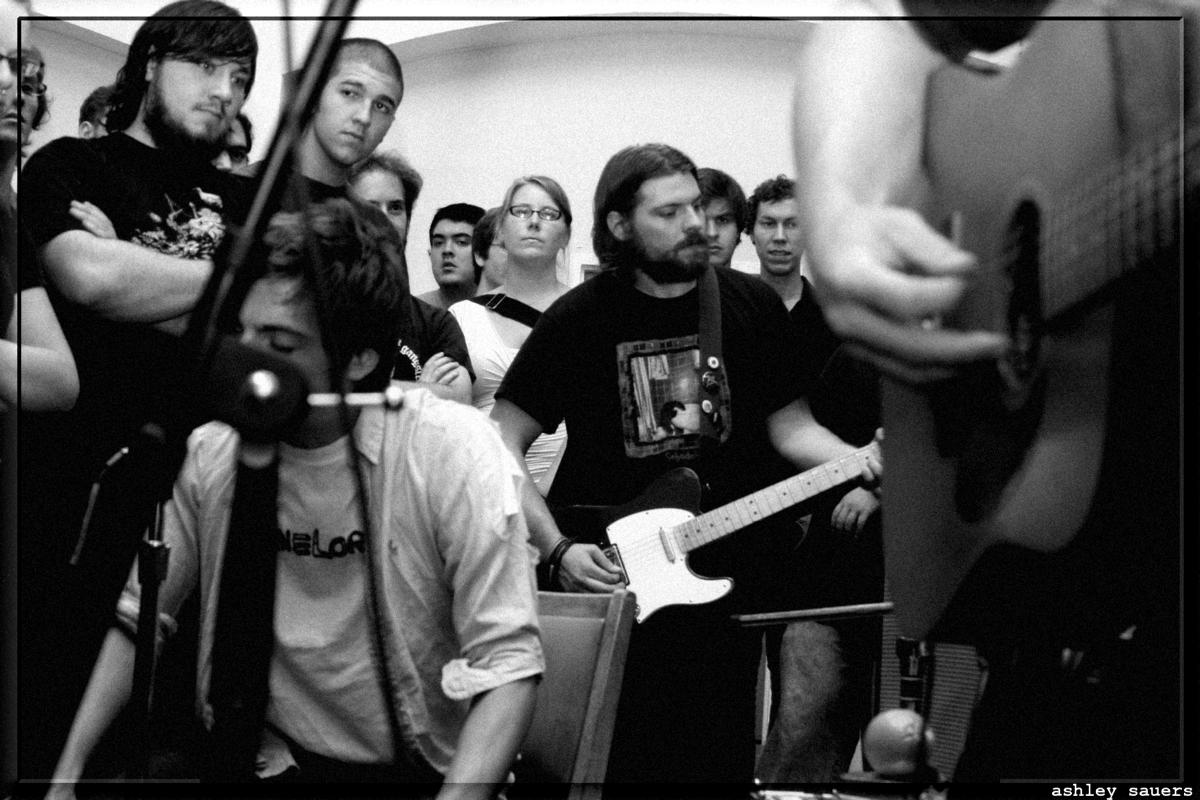
Band Pygmylush (shown in 2007) first released music on the label in 2009

While many releases are punk or post-punk, the label is not associated with one particular genre. According to Otto, "We like to release music we think is incredible, by people we think are exceptional, who are interested...in being part of a cultural community." Also, "in our opinion, [the bands] all make sense aesthetically together - while they may sound totally different, they come from the same place of urgency."

Owner Katy Otto drums or has drummed for a number of bands, including Del Cielo, Trophy Wife, The Lonely American, Homage to Catalonia, Problems, Helsinki, Callowhill, and Rainbow Crimes. Animals of Ambivalence and The Monsters in My Bed are her concept EPs. Most of her bands have released music on the label, although frequently with dual releases on other labels such as Eyeball Records. According to Otto, the bands tend to make better group decisions when working neutrally with a third-party label, as compared to one member owning the label themselves. Trophy Wife, for example, is on 307 Knox Records for this reason.

They've also done split releases with Golden Brown Records (Philadelphia) and Altin Village Records (Germany).

=== Current ===
- Anarkuss
- A Stick and a Stone
- Fine Motor
- The Lovers of Nothing
- Pygmylush
- Sbowe
- Star Matriarch
- Sun Within
- Upholstery
- Vidrozhena
- War on Women
- whitepicketfence

=== Past ===
- 1905
- Animals of Ambivalence
- Andrea Lisi
- Bellafea
- Callowhill
- Cool Moon
- Del Cielo
- Den of Thieves
- des ark
- Dropout Patrol
- Eulcid
- Exholiday
- Ghastly City Sleep
- Halflight
- The Halo Project
- Homage to Catalonia
- Hope and Anchor
- Kathy Cashel
- Life at These Speeds
- Light the Fuse and Run
- Liza Kate
- The Lonely American
- The Monsters in My Bed
- Mass Movement of the Moth
- M. G. Lederman
- New Idea Society
- Now Sleepyhead
- The Others
- Pash
- polarOPPOSITEbear
- Rachel Jacobs
- Rainbow Crimes
- RedRumsey (Vern Rumsey)
- Resin Hits
- Resister
- Respira
- Ricky Fitts
- The Shondes
- Teach Me Equals
- Trophy Wife (American band)
- Trophy Wife (Boston band)
- The Sinister Quarter
- Songs of August
- Thank God
- Tight Phantomz
- tornavalanche
- Turboslut
- Ultra Dolphins
- Van Johnson
- Wrong Day to Quit
- Gina Young

== Discography ==
No.	Artist	Title	Year
EXF001	The Halo Project	The Halo Project	2000
EXF002	Halflight	Halflight	2000
EXF003	Various	With Literacy and Justice for All	2002
EXF004	Light the Fuse and Run	All Your Base Are Belong to Us	2002
EXF005	Andrea Lisi / Homage to Catalonia	Andrea Lisi / Homage to Catalonia	2002
EXF006	Various (Enon, Death Cab for Cutie, Ted Leo, etc.)	Don't Know When I'll Be Back Again - A Compilation Benefiting American Veterans of the Vietnam War	2003
EXF007	Schlegel-n-Frasure	Hannah Campbell	2003
EXF008	1905	Voice	2003
EXF009	Kathy Cashel	The Rare Animal Zoo	2004
EXF010	Liza Kate, Rachel Jacobs	Rachel Jacobs & Liza Kate	2005
EXF011	Respira	A Still Silhouette	2003
EXF012	songs of august	1902	2004
EXF013	Del Cielo	Wish and Wait	2002
EXF014	The Sinister Quarter	Pink Guillotine	2004
EXF015	des_ark, Bellafea	des_ark / bellafea	2005
EXF016	Van Johnson	Ladies and Gentlemen	2004
EXF017	Van Johnson	EP	2005
EXF018	Kathy Cashel	The Question is Yes	2007
EXF019	Pash	Kingwood	2005
EXF020	Gina Young	She's So Androgynous	2005
EXF021	Various	This is a Care Package : A compilation benefiting Helping Individual Prostitutes Survive	2006
EXF022	Ricky Fitts	Wizard Lisp	2005
EXF023	Eulcid	Hope: And Songs to Sing	2006
EXF024	tornavalanche, Tight Phantomz	Tornavalanche/Tight Phantomz Split	2006
EXF025	Mass Movement of the Moth	Outerspace	2006
EXF026	Hope and Anchor	the wait and wonder	2006
EXF027	Wrong Day to Quit	Vicissitudes	2007
EXF028	Pash	The Best Gun	2007
EXF029	New Idea Society	The World is Bright and Lonely	2007
EXF030	Various (Strike Anywhere, Attrition, Junius, Off Minor, Ampere, etc.)	Keep Singing! A Benefit Compilation for Compassion Over Killing	2008
EXF031	Den of Thieves	Letters from the Tanzerouft	2008
EXF032	Life at These Speeds, Thank God	Thank God/Life at These Speeds split (split release with Tick Tock Records)	2008
EXF033	Now Sleepyhead	Nocturne (split release with Pop Faction Records)	2008
EXF034	Turboslut, Pygmylush	Turboslut / Pygmylush	2009
EXF035	tornavalanche	Get Rich or Cry Trying	2009
EXF036	Trophy Wife	Trophy Wife	2009
EXF037	polarOPPOSITEbear	polarOPPOSITEbear EP	2010
EXF038	Resin Hits	How to Cut a Rock	2010
EXF039	Ultra Dolphins	Alien Baby	2010
EXF040	Thank God	ice/age	2010
EXF041	M.G. Lederman	What Ifs and Bad Memories	2010
EXF042	A Stick and a Stone	Opal Nightly	2011
EXF043	The Lonely American	The Lonely American	2012
EXF044	Various	And Tonight the City Safely Sleeps : A Compilation for the District Alliance for Safe Housing	2012
EXF045	The Shondes	Searchlights	2011
EXF046	War on Women	Improvised Weapons	2012
EXF047	Animals of Ambivalence	The Animals of Ambivalence	2012
EXF048	Dropout Patrol	Dropout Patrol	2012
EXF049	Resister	Resister EP	2012
EXF050	The Others	The Others 1995-2002	2013
EXF051	The Shondes	The Garden	2013
EXF052	The Monsters in My Bed	The Monsters in My Bed	2014
EXF053	Exholiday	Pine Street	2014
EXF054	Callowhill	Self-titled 7 inch	2015
EXF055	Dascher-n-Otto	David Ian Dascher	2015
EXF056	Ghastly City Sleep	Lulling Skulls double LP split release NoMoonOn Records	2016
EXF057	The Shondes	Brighton	2016
EXF058	RedRumsey (Vern Rumsey)/Teach Me Equals	Split LP	2016
EXF059	Fine Motor	Self-titled	2017
EXF060	Cool Moon	Postparty Depression	2017
EXF061	Noise and Silence	self-titled cassette tape	2017
EXF062	Callowhill	The Way Out CD with digital download	2017
EXF063	Upholstery	"I.N.G.A." cd	2019
EXF064	Cool Moon	"The Devil Doesn't Always Need an Advocate" poster with download	2019
EXF065	The Voices Project	A series of interviews with white women ages 65 and older about their past experiences fighting white supremacy and for a more just world (interview series) || 2019	
EXF066	Rainbow Crimes	"We Disappear" cd and tape	2019
EXF067	Fine Motor	"Giant Woman" lp	2020
EXF068	Otto-n-Dascher	"Frances Köln Dascher" baby	2020
EXF069	Fine Motor	"Half Normal" digital only	2021
EXF070	Cool Moon	"Crossing the Finish Line" cd	2022
EXF071	Upholstery	"Set Up House remixes" digital	2022
EXF072	Upholstery	"Woven" digital and booklet	2023
EXF073	Star Matriarch	"Red Ship" digital previews by single	2023
EXF074	Fine Motor	"Phantom Power" LP	2023
EXF075	Sbowe	"Bat Hat" CD	2024
EXF076	Vidrozhena	"S/T" Digital	2024
EXF077	Erick Thomas Shelley	"Of Nut to Leaf" Book	2024
EXF078	Upholstery	"Ghouls" Booklet and download	2024
EXF079	Fine Motor	"Standing Wave" LP	2025
EXF080	Anarkuss	"S/T" Tape and CD	2025
EXF081	whitepicketfence	"S/T" Digital	2025, 7 inch 2026
EXF082	The Lovers of Nothing	"Party Animal Control" CD	2025
EXF083	Sun Within	"S/T" Digital	2025, 7 inch 2026
EXF084	Vidrozhena	"Now, Away" Digital and poster	2025
