= Garten der Unbewusstheit =

Studio album by Corrupted
- Released: August 20, 2011
- Recorded: December 2009–2010
- Venues: Osaka, Japan
- Studio: LM Studio
- Genres: Doom metal; Drone Metal
- Length: 63:41
- Label: Nostalgia Blackrain

Corrupted chronology
El mundo frio (2007)	Garten der Unbewusstheit (2011)

Garten der Unbewusstheit is the fifth album by Japanese doom metal band Corrupted, released on August 20, 2011. It was released 6 years after El mundo frio, marking the longest gap between 2 albums. It is also the last album to feature debut album members, Hevi and Talbot. The song features a remake of "Gekkou no Daichi (月光の大地)" as featured on the band's third studio album.

== Track listing ==
No.	Title	Length
1.	"Garten"	28:45
2.	"Against the Darkest Days"	4:34
3.	"Gekkou no Daichi" (月光の大地; remake of the original acoustic version from Se hace por los suenos asesinos)	30:22
Total length:		63:41
