= Trophy Wife =

Trophy wife is a colloquial term for any wife who is considered a status symbol. The term may also refer to:

- Trophy Wife, a 2005 TV movie starring Brooke Burns
- Trophy Wife (TV series), a 2013 American situation comedy
- Trophy Wife (English band), a band from Oxford, England
- Trophy Wife (American band), a punk rock band from Washington, D.C.
- Trophy Wife (Boston band), an indie rock band from Boston
- Potiche, a 2010 French-Belgian comedy film directed by Francois Ozon released in English-speaking countries as Trophy Wife
- Trophy Wife (film), a 2014 Filipino romantic drama-thriller film directed by Andoy Ranay
- "The Trophy Wife", 2006 song from the album Building a Better ______

== See also ==
- MVP (TV series), a 2008 Canadian TV series promoted as Trophy Wives in the United Kingdom
- Trophy (disambiguation)
