= Miller Wolf Oberman =

American poet

Miller Wolf Oberman is a poet who has won a Ruth Lilly fellowship, the 2016 92nd St Y’s Boston Review/ Discovery Prize and a 2023 NYSCA/NYFA Artist Fellowship. His translation of selections from the “Old English Rune Poem” won Poetry’s John Frederick Nims Memorial Prize For Translation in 2013. His collection "Impossible Things” was published on Duke University Press in October 2024. "The Unstill Ones," his first collection of poems and Old English translations was published in September 2017 by Princeton University Press. He serves on the board of Brooklyn Poets, is an editor at Broadsided Press, and teaches at Eugene Lang College at The New School. Miller lives in Queens with his wife, rock singer and rabbinical student Louisa Rachel Solomon of The Shondes and their children. He holds a PhD in English from the University of Connecticut, an MFA from Georgia College, and a BA from Sarah Lawrence College.

== Awards ==
NYSCA/NYFA Artist Fellowship, 2023.

Discovery/Boston Review Prize, 2016.

AWP Intro Award Journals Project, 2014 Honorable Mention for “Lies After the War.”

John Frederick Nims Memorial Prize for Translation, 2013, awarded by Poetry Magazine for the “Old English Rune Poem.”

The Wallace Stevens Student Poetry Prize, 2014.

Finalist for the Montreal International Poetry Prize, 2012.

Winner of a Dorothy Sargent Rosenberg Prize, 2009.

Winner of The Academy of American Poets University Prize, 2006.

Recipient of the Ruth Lilly Fellowship, 2005.

Recipient of the Flannery O'Connor Fellowship, 2004–2005.

Winner of the Sarah Lawrence College Andrea K. Willison Poetry Prize, 2000.

== Selected publications ==
Duke University Press: Impossible Things 2024

Princeton University Press:The Unstill Ones 2017

Poetry Magazine: “Theory” and “Two Shabbats with Paul Celan, February 2023

The New Yorker: “The Wind is Loud” June 2021

Poets.org: “Commas” June 22, 2021

Poetry Magazine: “This and That at the Frick” June 2020

Poets.org: “Taharah” December 10, 2019

Poetry Magazine: “Joy” May 2019

Harvard Review: “From Old English Rune Poem,” “The Ruin,” “Caedmon’s Hymn,” “Riddle 63” and “Riddle 94.” June 4, 2018

Southeast Review: “He Was Restless,” summer 2016.

The Minnesota Review: “Silentium” 2016.

Tin House: “Wulf and Eadwacer” and “Tension” Winter 2016/17.

The Nation: “Lies After the War,” 2016.

Broadsided Press: “Morning Pastoral,” 2016.

Boston Review: “Wolf Brother,” summer 2016.

Fourteen Hills: “The Smokewood Tree,” summer, 2016.

Poetry Magazine: translation of “The Woman Who Cannot,” July/August, 2016.

berfrois: “The Grave,” March, 2016, and “The Ruin” and “Dear Lengthening Day” June, 2016.

Beloit Poetry Journal: “Who People Are,” winter 2015-2016.

Poetry Daily: “Who People Are,” February 25, 2016.

Poetry Magazine: “On Trans,” March, 2015.

Poetry Magazine: translation from the “Old English Rune Poem,” June, 2013.

Rattle: “Ears” Summer, 2010.

Realpoetik: “Myron,” “To Keep the House Quiet,” “Eighth Nerve” and “Daybreak,” April, 2008.

The Minnesota Review: “Dixie Paint,” Winter, 2006.

Bloom Magazine: “After the Demolition Derby,” Fall, 2005.
