= Infant Island =

American screamo band

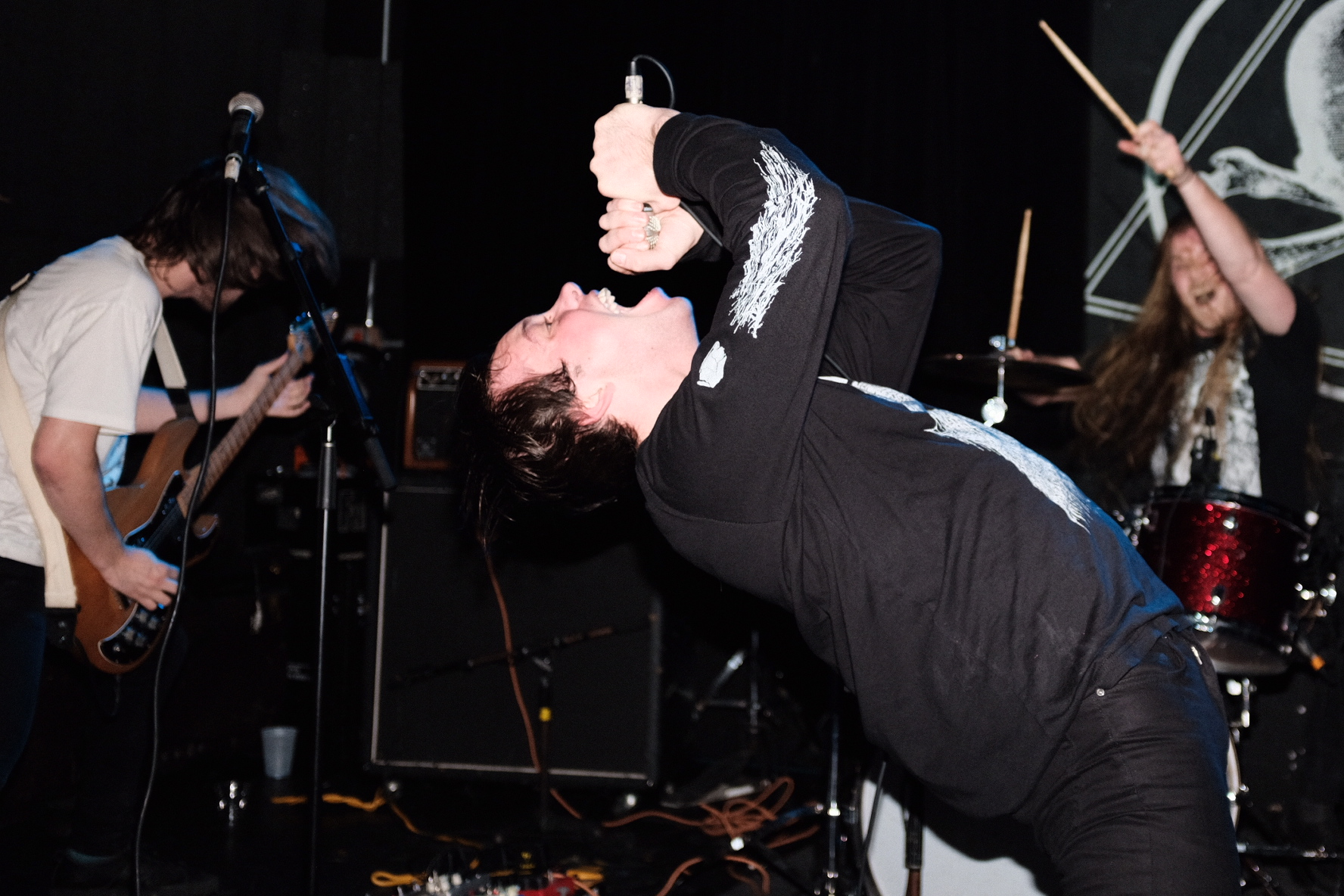
- Infant Island performing live in Brooklyn at Saint Vitus in November 2018.

Background information
- Origin: Fredericksburg, Virginia, U.S.
- Genres: Screamo; blackgaze; post-rock; post-metal
- Years active: 2016–present
- Labels: Secret Voice; Dog Knights Productions; Acrobat Unstable Records; Zegema Beach Records; Left Hand Label
- Members: Daniel Kost; Alexander Rudenshiold; Kyle Guerra; Austin O'Rourke; Winston Givler
- Past members: James Rakestraw
- Website: infantisland.us

Infant Island is an American blackgaze screamo band formed in Fredericksburg, Virginia in 2016. The band consists of vocalist Daniel Kost, guitarists Alexander Rudenshiold and Winston Givler, bassist Kyle Guerra, and drummer Austin O'Rourke.

== History ==
=== Formation and Infant Island (2016–2018) ===
Infant Island was formed in the summer 2016 by vocalist Daniel Kost, guitarist Alexander Rudenshiold, bassist Kyle Guerra, and drummer James Rakestraw. On August 1, 2018, in advance of a U.S. and Canada tour, they released their self-titled debut album to critical acclaim. In the same month, the album was featured in Noisey's "Summer of Screamo" column, in which writer Dan Ozzi called it "a linchpin for modern screamo". In October 2018, the band parted ways with drummer James Rakestraw – replacing him with Austin O'Rourke who had formerly worked with bassist Guerra in smallhands, an early touring and split EP partner band for Infant Island.

In February 2019, Infant Island was featured in The Washington Post, along with contemporaries Vein and Portrayal of Guilt, as delivering "new life" to screamo.

=== Beneath and Sepulcher (2019–2020) ===
In a March 2019 interview for RVA Magazine, guitarist Alexander Rudenshiold said that the band's second album was entirely recorded. In April 2020 the band announced that their second album, Beneath, would be released in May of that year on Dog Knights Productions. They also released a music video for "Someplace Else", the last track from the album. On April 17, 2020, Infant Island released the second single for Beneath, "Stare Spells", along with a previously unannounced "mini-LP" titled Sepulcher to positive reviews. Beneath was released on May 15, 2020 to positive reviews. Though chronologically it was released before Beneath, Sepulcher consists of material recorded almost a year after. Beneath was featured on several "Best of 2020" lists.

In response to the George Floyd protests, on June 5 Infant Island released a compilation album titled Collections 1, donating the proceeds to bail funds and mutual aid groups supporting protesters in Richmond and Fredericksburg, Virginia. Collections 1 contains previously unreleased tracks, reworks of songs by the band's members, as well as "rarities" from their compilation appearances and split albums.

=== Obsidian Wreath (2020–present) ===
In November 2023, Infant Island announced that their third album, which was written in 2020, Obsidian Wreath would be released in January 2024 on Touché Amoré frontman Jeremy Bolm's label Secret Voice, and shared the album's lead single "Another Cycle". The label had previously featured a song from the band on its Balladeers, Redefined compilation earlier in 2023.

== Musical style ==
Infant Island's musical style has been universally described as screamo, and has often been compared to their regional predecessors Pg.99, City of Caterpillar, and Majority Rule. In 2018, after the release of their self-titled album, Stereogum's Chris DeVille described their style as "Deafheaven reframed in the sonic palette of Diary-era Sunny Day Real Estate". The band's 2020 releases Sepulcher and Beneath saw them shift towards a more directly metallic approach, with reviewers drawing comparisons to grindcore, sludge metal, and particularly black metal.

== Band members ==
Current members

- Daniel Kost – vocals (2016–present)
- Alexander Rudenshiold – guitar/vocals (2016–present)
- Kyle Guerra – bass (2016–present)
- Austin O'Rourke – drums (2018–present)
- Winston Givler – guitar (2019–present)

Past members

- James Rakestraw – drums (2016–2018)

== Discography ==
=== Studio albums ===
Title	Album details	Comments
Infant Island	Released: August 1, 2018; Labels: Middle-Man Records, Conditions Records, Dingleberry Records, Zegema Beach Records, Left Hand Label; Formats: DL, 12", cassette	
Sepulcher	Released: April 17, 2020; Labels: Acrobat Unstable, Left Hand Label, Zegema Beach; Formats: DL, 12", cassette	Marketed as a "miniLP"
Beneath	Released: May 15, 2020; Label: Dog Knights Productions; Formats: DL, 12", cassette	
Obsidian Wreath	Released: January 12, 2024; Label: Secret Voice; Formats: DL, 12", cassette	

=== Extended plays ===
Title	EP details	Comments
Hymnes aux Désarrois de la Peau	Released: July 1, 2019; Labels: Middle Man Records, Dickcrushrecords, RIP In Peace Records, People Places Records, Le Blast Records, Zegema Beach Records, No Funeral Records, Dingleberry Records, i.Corrupt Records, Pundonor Records, Blessedhands Records, Dasein Records, Listen to Aylin Records, A Fond d’Cale Productions, Santapogue Media, Dance Happy Doom Crew, and Left Hand Label; Formats: DL, 12", cassette	Split EP w/ Massa Nera, Frail Body, & Dianacrawls
Infant Island / smallhands	Released: March 3, 2017; Label: Self-released; Formats: DL, 10" lathe cut, cassette	Split EP w/ smallhands
Infant Island / Maidenhair	Released: December 16, 2016; Label: Self-released; Formats: DL, cassette	Split EP w/ Maidenhair

=== Compilation albums ===
Title	Album details	Comments
Collections 1	Released: June 5, 2020; Label: Hidden Sound Collective; Formats: DL, cassette	Includes alternate versions, bonus and unreleased tracks, remixes, and songs from split releases from 2016 until 2020.

=== Singles ===
Title	Single details	Comments
"Where There Is Ruin"	Released: May 28, 2018; Label: Self-released; Formats: DL	Also released as a bonus track on the Left Hand Label issue of the S/T cassette.
"Stare Spells"	Released: April 17, 2020; Label: Dog Knights Productions; Formats: DL	
"Another Cycle"	Released: November 7, 2023; Label: Secret Voice; Formats: DL	
"Unrelenting"	Released: December 5, 2023; Label: Secret Voice; Formats: DL	

=== Music videos ===
Title	Year	Director
"Someplace Else"	2020	Madeleine Morgan

=== Compilation appearances ===
- "Ugly Brunette/July 5th" (originally by Horse Jumper of Love; Compilation "Grave Neighbors Volume 2") (2018, Middle-Man Records)
- "A Preoccupation (Reprise)" (Compilation "Sordid States Volume 2") (2019, Middle-Man Records)
- "Aurora" (Compilation "Balladeers, Redefined") (2023, Secret Voice)
- "Dayvan Cowboy" (originally by Boards of Canada; Compilation "Grave Neighbors Volume 7") (2023, Middle-Man Records)
