= Obsidian Wreath =

Studio album by Infant Island
- Released: January 12, 2024
- Recorded: January–February 2021
- Studio: Ivakota (Capitol Hill); Viva
- Length: 36:07
- Label: Secret Voice; Deathwish
- Producer: Matthew Michel

Infant Island chronology
Beneath (2020)	Obsidian Wreath (2024)

Singles from Obsidian Wreath
- 1. "Another Cycle" Released: November 7, 2023; 2. "Unrelenting" Released: December 5, 2023; 3. "Kindling" Released: January 3, 2024

Professional ratings
Review scores
Source	Rating
Pitchfork	7.6/10
Beats Per Minute	86%
MetalSucks	4.5/5 stars
Sputnikmusic	4/5 stars

Obsidian Wreath is the fourth studio album (Note: Third if discounting Sepulcher (2020), which was marketed as a "mini-LP".) by the American blackgaze screamo band Infant Island. It was released on January 12, 2024, through Secret Voice and Deathwish, Inc. It was produced by Matthew Michel of Majority Rule at Ivakota Studio in Capitol Hill and at his studio in Fairfax, Virginia. The album includes a number of guest vocalist performances, but most prominently features members of shoegaze band Greet Death and metalcore band .Gif from God.

The band released the lead single from the album, "Another Cycle", on November 7, 2023, to critical acclaim. The song was named the 28th best single of 2023 by digital magazine Beats Per Minute. A second single, "Unrelenting", was released on December 5, 2023. The third and final single, "Kindling", was released on January 3, 2024.

== Track listing ==
Obsidian Wreath track listing
No.	Title	Length
1.	"Another Cycle"	2:51
2.	"Fulfilled"	1:36
3.	"Found Hand"	2:15
4.	"Clawing, Still"	2:51
5.	"Veil"	4:52
6.	"Amaranthine"	4:15
7.	"With Shadow"	3:50
8.	"Unrelenting"	2:38
9.	"Kindling"	4:02
10.	"Vestygian"	6:57
Total length:		36:07

== Personnel ==
Infant Island

- Daniel Kost – vocals
- Alexander Rudenshiold – guitar, vocals
- Winston Givler — guitar, vocals
- Kyle Guerra – bass, vocals, vocal engineering
- Austin O'Rourke – drums, percussion, piano, cello, accordion, mandolin, vocals, orchestral arrangements, overdubbing, engineering, logo design

Additional instrumentation

- Andrew "Shorts" Schwartz (.Gif from God) – guest vocals on "Another Cycle", "Clawing, Still", and "Veil"
- Harper Boyhtari (Greet Death) – guest vocals on "Kindling"
- Logan Gaval (Greet Death) – guest vocals on "Kindling"
- Josh McIntyre (Malevich) – gang vocals on "Veil"
- Sasha Schilbrack-Cole (Malevich) – gang vocals on "Veil"
- Daniel DeSimone (Malevich) – gang vocals on "Veil"
- Connor Ray (Malevich) – gang vocals on "Veil"
- Adam Stergis (Mikau) – gang vocals on "Veil"
- John Irby (Mikau) – gang vocals on "Veil"
- Alexander Jones (Undeath) – gang vocals on "Veil"
- King Yosef – gang vocals on "Veil"
- Hellena Christensen (Senza) – gang vocals on "Veil"
- Rosa Delgado (For Your Health) – gang vocals on "Veil"
- Meghan Harris (Watchdogs) – gang vocals on "Veil"
- The Faceless Ensemble – orchestral arrangements

Technical credits

- Matthew Michel – engineering, mixing
- Brad Boatright – mastering

Artistic credits

- Sarah Bachman – artwork
- Alexander Rudenshiold – layout, design
