= City of Caterpillar (album) =

Studio album by City of Caterpillar
- Released: May 1, 2002
- Recorded: 2001–2002
- Genres: Screamo, post-hardcore, post-rock
- Length: 44:06
- Label: Level Plane (LP-36)

City of Caterpillar chronology
City of Caterpillar (2002)	Demo and Live Recording (2002)

Professional ratings
Review scores
Source	Rating
Allmusic	4.5/5 stars
Punknews.org	4.5/5 stars

City of Caterpillar is the debut studio album by American band City of Caterpillar, which was released on May 1, 2002 on LP and CD formats through Level Plane Records. Since its release, critics have praised its sound, which combines elements of screamo with post-rock, and it is now seen as an essential recording of early 2000s screamo. The album would eventually become out-of-print for years, however Repeater Records reissued a remastered version of the album on LP format on May 27, 2016.

== Background and recording ==
The band recorded the album in Maryland between the years 2001 and 2002, hiring Mark Smoot to record and master it. According to guitarist/vocalist Brandon Evans, the band frequently listened to The Cure's album Pornography during the recording sessions, and most of the mixing decisions were influenced by the album. Of the recording sessions, only one track was left off the final album, titled "As the Curtains Dim (Little White Lie)". Originally intended to appear on a 10" split with Pg. 99, which would eventually go unreleased, the track would later be released as a digital single in 2016, as well as being released as the b-side to the group's 2017 "Driving Spain Up a Wall" 12" single.

== Critical reception and legacy ==
City of Caterpillar is now seen by critics as one of the best screamo albums from the early 2000s. Named as one of Treble Zine's ten essential screamo albums in 2014, A.T. Bossenger called it "consistently unpredictable" and "an irresistibly thrilling ride". In Blake Butler's review of the album for the Allmusic Guide, he rewarded the album a near-perfect four and a half stars out of a possible five, stating that the group's "moody, sometimes spastic, sometimes brooding breed of dark rock is both well-written and timeless", concluding his write up by stating "albums of this breed only come along a few times in a genre." Punknews.org staff member Jordon Rogowski similarly rated the album four and a half stars out of five, calling it "one of the most promising releases [he has] heard in years." In an article for Vice about both the album and the band, Jason Heller states that City of Caterpillar is "something we'll never stop being in awe of."

The album is now seen to of help influence the post-rock-meets-screamo style that is sometimes called "post-screamo". The album has helped influence artists such as Envy and Circle Takes the Square.

== Track listing ==
No.	Title	Length
1.	"And You're Wondering How a Top Floor Could Replace Heaven"	8:33
2.	"A Heart Filled Reaction to Dissatisfaction"	2:33
3.	"Minute-Hour-Day-Week-Month-Year- (The Faiths In My Chest)"	9:17
4.	"Fucking Hero"	3:52
5.	"When Was the Last Time We Painted Over the Blood On the Walls?"	4:37
6.	"A Little Change Could Go a Long Ways"	9:39
7.	"Maybe They'll Gnaw Right Through"	5:37

== Personnel ==
- Jeff Kane - guitar
- Brandon Evans - guitar, vocals
- Kevin Longendyke - bass, vocals
- Ryan Parrish - drums
- Mark Smoot - recording, mastering
- Jack Shirley - remastering (2016 Repeater Records edition)
