= 1905 (disambiguation) =

1905 was a common year starting on Sunday of the Gregorian calendar.

1905 may also refer to:

- 1905 BC, a year in the 20th century BC
- 1905 (band), an American political hardcore punk band
- 1905 (book), a historical account of the First Russian Revolution written by Leon Trotsky
- 1905 (film), a Japanese film
