= Beneath (Infant Island album) =

Studio album by Infant Island
- Released: May 15, 2020
- Recorded: December 2018 – January 2019
- Studio: Viva Studio
- Genre: Screamo; post-metal; black metal
- Length: 26:25
- Label: Dog Knights Productions
- Producer: Matthew Michel

Infant Island chronology
Sepulcher (2020)	Beneath (2020)	Obsidian Wreath (2024)

Professional ratings
Review scores
Source	Rating
Pitchfork	7.9/10

Beneath is the third studio album (Note: Second if discounting Sepulcher, which was marketed as a "mini-LP".) by the American screamo band Infant Island. It was released on May 15, 2020, through Dog Knights Productions. It was produced by Matthew Michel of Majority Rule at his studio in Dunn Loring, Virginia. The album features a guest vocal performance from Logan Rivera of Gillian Carter. "Death Portrait" is a re-recording of a song which originally appeared on the band's 4-way split Hymnes aux Désarrois de la Peau.

The album was critically acclaimed at the time of its release, and was named one of the best albums of the year by BrooklynVegan and Impose.

== Track listing ==
No.	Title	Length
1.	"Here We Are"	3:23
2.	"Signed in Blood"	2:43
3.	"Content"	4:21
4.	"The Garden"	2:30
5.	"One Eyed"	1:45
6.	"Death Portrait"	2:40
7.	"Colossal Air"	1:50
8.	"Stare Spells"	4:33
9.	"Someplace Else"	2:40
Total length:		26:25

== Personnel ==
Beneath personnel adapted from LP liner notes.

Infant Island

- Daniel Kost – vocals
- Alexander Rudenshiold – guitar, vocals
- Kyle Guerra – bass
- Austin O’Rourke – drums

Additional instrumentation

- Austin O’Rourke – orchestral arrangements, interludes
- Winston Givler – noise on "Here We Are," guitar on "One Eyed"
- Logan Rivera (Gillian Carter) – guest vocals on "Content"

Technical credits

- James Rakestraw – original drums on "Here We Are" and "Death Portrait"
- Matthew Michel (Majority Rule) – engineering, recording, mixing
- Brad Boatright – mastering

Artistic credits

- John Martin – artwork
  - Front cover: Sadak in Search of the Waters of Oblivion
  - Back cover: The Great Day of His Wrath
  - Innersleeve art: The Plains of Heaven
- Austin O'Rourke – art processing, logo design
- Alexander Rudenshiold – art processing, layout, design
