= Enemy Soil =

Enemy Soil may refer to:

- Enemy Soil (band)
- Enemy Soil (record label)
