= Anciano =

EP by Corrupted
- Released: 1995
- Genre: Funeral doom, sludge metal
- Length: 12:27
- Label: Japan Overseas

Corrupted chronology
Corrupted / Grief (1995)	Anciano (1995)	El Dios Queja (1995)

Anciano (Spanish for old man) is an EP by the Japanese doom metal band Corrupted. Because the Spanish phrase "Horrible: El Tren Lo Partió En Dos!" ("Horrible: The Train Cut Him In Two") appears on the cover, the phrase is often mistaken to be the title of the EP. The album was pressed four times on 7-inch vinyl; the first two using a black and white cover, the third blue, and the fourth brown. "The Post War Dream" is a cover of the Pink Floyd song that opens their 1983 album The Final Cut.

== Track listing ==
No.	Title	Length
1.	"The Post War Dream" (Pink Floyd cover)	2:25
2.	"Si mismo defensa"	5:09
3.	"Que cabronada"	0:18
4.	"Anciano"	4:35
Total length:		12:21
