= Document 7 =

Document #7

Studio album by Pg. 99
- Released: 2001
- Recorded: Spring 2000
- Studio: Oblivion Studios (Upper Marlboro, Maryland)
- Genres: Hardcore punk, screamo, emoviolence
- Length: 25:26
- Labels: Happy Couples Never Last, Magic Bullet Records
- Producer: Mike Bossier

Pg. 99 chronology
Document #6 (2000)	Document #7 (2001)	Document #8 (2001)

Professional ratings
Review scores
Source	Rating
AllMusic	4.0/5.0 stars
Sputnikmusic	4.0/5.0 stars

Document #7 is the second full-length album by American screamo band Pg. 99, originally released in early 2001 through Happy Couples Never Last. The vinyl edition first came out on July 23, 2002, through Magic Bullet Records. There were four pressings of the album on vinyl, with a total of 1,902 vinyl copies pressed. The album's overall tone and sound is very different to other Pg. 99 releases, focusing much more on progression and atmosphere rather than energetic fury. Originally, the entire record was supposed to be the Pg.99 side of a cancelled split with Love Lost But Not Forgotten and The Hareste.

The album would eventually go out-of-print for years, however Magic Bullet would release the album digitally on Bandcamp (as well as making it available on streaming services) on August 11, 2017, to coincide with the band's 2017 reunion tour. A planned cassette release of the album via guitarist Mike Taylor's label Yr Screaming Youth has been announced as well.

== Track listing ==
No.	Title	Length
1.	"Living in the Skeleton of a Happy Memory"	7:50
2.	"Del Mundo Lleno de Rocio"	1:18
3.	"The Mangled Hand"	4:05
4.	"Love Goes Tisk... Tisk... Tisk..."	1:08
5.	"A Sonnet to Both the Ugly and Murderous"	10:59

== Personnel ==
=== Pg.99 ===
- Blake Midgette - vocals
- Chris Taylor - vocals
- Mike Taylor - guitar, cover art
- Mike Casto - guitar
- George Crum - guitar
- Cory Stevenson - bass
- Brandon Evans - bass, vocals
- Johnny Ward - drums

=== Production ===
- Nikki Kelce - artwork
- Fil - photography
- Mike Bossier - recording, production
