= 1905 (band) =

US musical group

"Fall"
Sample of the track "Fall" off Voice by 1905, illustrating their at-times screamed vocals and political lyrics

1905 was a political hardcore punk band from Washington, D.C., formed in 2000. The band featured dual male and female vocals, their music drew inspiration from a combination of early 1980s UK anarcho-punk bands such as Crass, Zounds, The Mob as well as folk and hardcore punk. The band has been cited as a major influence on several bands including Defiance, Ohio and modern screamo acts like I Would Set Myself on Fire for You and post-hardcore band Pygmylush, among others. The band broke up in 2005 after the release of their only album "Voice", released on Exotic Fever Records.

== Discography ==
- Demo (2002)
- Voice (2004)
- 1905 / Amanda Woodward split 7-inch (2004)
