= Document 5 =

Document #5

Studio album by Pg. 99
- Released: April 26, 2000
- Recorded: September 9–10, 1999
- Genre: Hardcore punk, screamo, emoviolence
- Length: 29:00
- Label: Reptilian Records
- Producer: Drew Mazurek, Mike Taylor

Pg. 99 chronology
Document #4 (1999)	Document #5 (2000)	Document #6 (2000)

Alternate cover
- Limited edition vinyl cover

Professional ratings
Review scores
Source	Rating
AllMusic	3.0/5.0 stars
Sputnikmusic	4.5/5.0 stars

Document #5 is the first full-length album by hardcore punk band Pg. 99, released in 2000 through Reptilian Records. The album was released on vinyl and CD formats; the vinyl version was released in limited quantities, with 666 copies made. 200 copies were on grey marble vinyl, while the rest were standard black vinyl. Reptilian Records announced that the album would be reissued on LP format in the summer of 2015, however, its release date was pushed back to October 27, 2017, to coincide with the band's reunion tour. The reissue was released on compact disc, vinyl, and digital formats.

== Artwork ==
The artwork to the CD edition was made by Carlos Batts, who's known for working with bands such as Danzig and Mastodon. The cover to the vinyl edition was drawn by Chris Taylor, one of the vocalists of Pg. 99. It features a short comic, showing a young man walking through a wall. The same comic was also used on the inside sleeve to the vinyl version of their discography compilation Document #14: The Singles.

== Track listing ==
No.	Title	Length
1.	"Ruiner of Life"	1:34
2.	"Comedy of Christ"	2:16
3.	"Skinpack"	1:49
4.	"My Application to Heaven..."	3:04
5.	"Hotel Nevada, 1982"	1:29
6.	"Humans With Forked Tongues"	3:53
7.	"Murder, Conductor"	1:04
8.	"(.............)"	1:31
9.	"Sounds of Gravesites -(-upturned)"	0:46
10.	"By the Fireplace in White"	11:27

== Personnel ==
Pg.99

- Blake Midgette - Vocals
- Chris Taylor - Vocals
- Mike Taylor - Guitar
- George Crum - Guitar
- Cory Stevenson - Bass
- Jonny Ward - Drums

Production

- Carlos Batts - Artwork (CD Version)
- Christ Taylor - Artwork (LP Version)
- Drew Mazurek - Engineering, Recording
- Mike Taylor - Recording
- Fil - Photography
