= Corrupted (band) =

Japanese doom/sludge metal band

- Origin: Osaka, Japan
- Genres: Sludge metal; doom metal; ambient; drone metal
- Years active: 1994–present
- Labels: HG Fact; Nostalgia Blackrain
- Members: Chew Hasegawa; Mark Yokota; Kaz Mike; Rie Lambdoll
- Past members: Hevi; Talbot; Monger; Lowell Isles; Shibata; Jose; Takehito Miyagi; Ippei Suda; Taiki; Mother Sii
- Website: corrupted1994.bandcamp.com

Corrupted are a Japanese doom/sludge metal band from Osaka, founded in 1994. The band is notoriously shrouded in mystery due to their avoidance of publicity by never doing interviews or taking press photos, with the only existing photographs of them being ones taken by fans at concerts. Additionally, they are known for writing their lyrics almost exclusively in Spanish, with certain sections occasionally containing Japanese, English, and German. Since their inception, the band has released several full-length albums and EPs, including split albums with other bands, and they often perform live regularly in Japan and abroad.

== Musical style ==
They were described by JB Roe of Grooveshark as "some of the heaviest, gloomiest doom/sludge around, distinctly cacophonous, layering feedback pulverizing progressions into a distinctly cacophonous rumble." However, some songs feature long acoustic sections, spoken-word interludes, and unconventional instruments. An example of the latter can be found on their 2005 album El mundo frio, which is a 72-minute song with extensive sections of harp. Iann Robinson wrote on Nonelouder.com, "Right when you think you can peg Corrupted as an all Doom band they release a lush acoustic set within their bleak musical landscape."

They mainly sing in Spanish, with some songs containing sections in Japanese or English.

In 2009, Terrorizer chose Corrupted's 1997 album Paso inferior as the seventeenth-best sludge album. They wrote at the time,

Corrupted allow no interviews, no promo photos, and no pretension into their isolated world and rarely bother to play outside their own country, yet their music—whether it be sludge, or instrumental ambience—has had an immeasurable impact upon dozens of disciples of the heavy all across the board.

In 2002, the band released a statement about interviews:

We've never done an interview and we don't let professional photographers take our picture. This is our policy—more an attitude—that we'd like to keep. Our expression of being Corrupted is in the sound, lyrics and artwork of our records. Of course, we always appreciate the people who buy our records, see us play and support us along with the fanzines, labels, distributors and event planners. We do not reject all media, or bash writers who express themselves through articles or reviews. All are free and it's only through our personal expression of using the media that we exclude interviews.

— Corrupted

== Discography ==
=== Albums ===
- Paso Inferior (1997, Frigidity Discos)
- Llenandose De Gusanos (1999, HG Fact)
- Se Hace Por Los Suenos Asesinos (2004, HG Fact)
- El Mundo Frio (2005, HG Fact)
- Garten Der Unbewusstheit (2011, Nostalgia Blackrain)
- Pray For The Hollow Sun (2024, Self-released)

=== EPs ===
- Anciano (1995, Japan Overseas)
- El Dios Queja (1995, Tag Rag)
- Nadie (1995, Third Culture)
- Dios injusto (1999, Frigidity Discos)
- Felicific Algorithim (2018, Cold Spring Records)
- Mushikeras (2023, Self-released)

=== Singles ===
- "La Victima Es Tu Mismo" (2001, View Beyond Records)
- "Vasana" (2007, HG Fact)
- "An Island Insane" (2007, HG Fact)
- "喪失: Loss" (2015, Crust War)

=== Splits ===
- with Grief (1995), HG Fact)
- with Black Army Jacket (1997, Frigidity Discos)
- with Enemy Soil (1997, HG Fact)
- with Noothgrush (1997, Reservoir)
- with Scarver's Calling (1999, Gouge Records)
- with Phobia (1999, Rhetoric Records / Deaf American Recordings)
- with Meat Slave (2000, HG Fact)
- with Machetazo (2000, Frigidity Records)
- with Sloth (2000, self-released)
- with Discordance Axis and 324 (2001, HG Fact)
- with Cripple Bastards (2002, HG Fact)
- with Infaust (2002, Blind Date)

=== Compilation appearances ===
- Raggle Taggle (1996, Tag Rag)
- Una De Gato Cuerno De Vaca (1996, Tee Pee Records)
- Painkiller Vol. 1 (1996, Devastating Soundworks)
- Reality No. 3 (1999, Deep Six Records)
- Homeless Benefit EP (1999, Bad Card Records)
- Twin Threat To Your Sanity (2001, Bad People Records)

== Members ==
- Chew Hasegawa – drums
- Mark Yokota – guitar
- Kaz Mike ー bass guitar
- Rie Lambdoll ー vocals

=== Previous members ===
- Yasushi Yoshida – vocals (live-only)
- Takaho – vocals (live-only)
- Kawabata – vocals (live-only)
- Hevi – vocals, bass guitar
- Talbot – guitar
- Anri – harp on El mundo frio
- Takehito Miyagi – keyboards (studio-only)
- Shibata – bass guitar
- Jose – bass guitar
- Lowell Isles – bass guitar
- Katsumi Hiryu – bass guitar
- Monger – bass guitar
- Ippei Suda – bass guitar
- Mother Sii – vocals
