= Llenandose de gusanos =

Studio album by Corrupted
- Released: October 15, 1999
- Genre: Doom metal; ambient
- Length: 123:51
- Label: HG Fact

Corrupted chronology
Dios injusto (1999)	Llenandose de gusanos (1999)	La victima es tu mismo (2001)

Llenandose de gusanos is the second full-length studio album by Japanese doom metal band Corrupted. The album comprises two CDs, each containing only one track. The first disc is in the typical doom style Corrupted is known for, while the second disc contains ambience.

The title is Spanish for "Filling of Worms" or "Filling Oneself with Worms", although the technical Spanish translation for "filling oneself" is llenándose, not llenandose; the accent mark was left off the title.

== Track listing ==
Disc one
No.	Title	Length
1.	"Sangre/Humanos" ("Blood/Humans")	49:56
Total length:		49:56

Disc two
No.	Title	Length
1.	"El mundo" ("The World")	73:55
Total length:		73:55

== Personnel ==
- Jose – bass guitar
- Chew Hasegawa – drums
- Talbot – guitar
- Hevi – vocals
- Takehito Miyagi – ambient sounds
- Ippei Suda, Ryo Watanabe – mixing
- Bravo Yoshida – piano, synthesizer
- Ippei Suda, Hara Koichi – recording
