= Trophy Wife (American band) =

American punk band

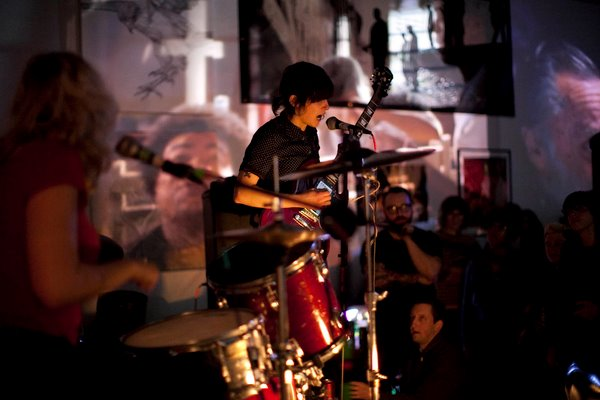

Background information
- Origin: Washington D.C., United States
- Genres: Post-hardcore, punk, grunge
- Years active: 2009–present
- Labels: Meet Your Adversary Records, 307 Knox Records, Exotic Fever Records
- Members: Diane Foglizzo; Katy Otto
- Website: Trophy Wife on Blogspot

Trophy Wife is an American punk and post-hardcore band based in Philadelphia, Pennsylvania. Founded in Washington, D.C., in 2009, members are Diane Foglizzo on guitar and Katy Otto on drums, with both Foglizzo and Otto singing. They tour frequently, and many of their shows double as benefits for non-profit organizations. They have released three full albums: Patience Fury (2010), Sing What Scares You (2012), and All the Sides (2014).

== History ==
=== Founding ===
Before co-founding the band in 2009, members Otto and Foglizzo were both involved in the punk music scene of Washington, D.C. Otto was a co-founder of Exotic Fever Records and drummed in a number of underground rock bands. Foglizzo had become interested in punk while living in Washington, D.C., and was involved with programs such as Girls Rock!

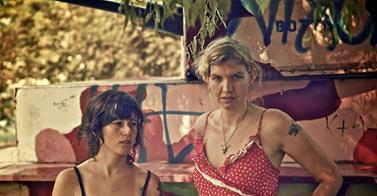
Foglizzo (left) and Otto (right)

Otto and Foglizzo met while both working on the punk music zine Give Me Back, founded in the wake of the zine HeartattaCk, and in a similar style. Otto asked Foglizzo to play music together, and they started writing songs. At the time, both women were avid fans of the post-hardcore bands Lungfish and Karp, and later the sludge metal band Big Business. They were also fans of French band La Fraction.

They founded Trophy Wife in 2009. The name Trophy Wife, according to Otto, was originally chosen because she thought it was "a hilarious, snarky band name for two female socialized people to have." The name gradually gained a more complex interpretation, with Otto later stating, "The name Trophy Wife basically for me was a smirk at the concept in general of women in a detached, object role. I want a world of women and girls as subjects. And subjecthood, with all its painful trappings, pitfalls, and machinations, is exactly why we do this band."

Their first show was at the Black Cat venue with punk bands The Shondes and Bellafea. In 2009 they released a tape on Exotic Fever. Otto left D.C. in 2010 and moved to Philadelphia, Pennsylvania, and Foglizzo left D.C. in 2010 as well. They continued to tour and produce new songs.

=== Patience Fury (2010) ===
Their first full-length album, Patience Fury, was recorded with their mutual friend Devin Ocampo (of bands Faraquet and Smart Went Crazy). The album was released in 2010 on 307 Knox Records in Durham, North Carolina.

Sadie Magazine said Patience Fury "is challenging and experimental: the record...doesn’t fit neatly into descriptions or genres." Despite not defining the band's genre, the review compared individual tracks to rock bands such as Fugazi, The Breeders, and Braid. Unlike their first EP, both Otto and Foglizzo's singing voices can be heard clearly on the album, either shouting or sustaining melody and harmony. The lyrics address a number of diverse topics, with the song "Sister Outsider" an homage to activist and writer Audre Lorde. They toured in support of the album.

=== Sing What Scares You (2012) ===
During much of the writing for their second album, Sing What Scares You, the two lived in different cities. They later reunited in Philadelphia.

"The songs’ emotional intensity and thought-provoking bite are sharpened by the fact that you can understand almost every word [Foglizzo] is singing...Trophy Wife's music aims to present life and relationships with a refreshing and uncompromising sense of realism."
— Washington City Paper

In July 2012 the band released the nine-track album Sing What Scares You on 307 Knox Records and Meet Your Adversary Records. Reception was generally positive. A review in the Washington City Paper said, "Their pummeling, cathartic, holler-along songs are full of time changes, rhythmically staggered harmonies, and other moving parts set off by subtle cues." Thematically, many of the songs are about the relationships and distances between people.

The band promoted the album with a number of shows on the East Coast, and by January 2013 they had also toured the Midwest, the South, and the West Coast. The Washington City Paper said of their performances, "When they're locked in a groove, the communication is seamless: The energy that pulses in the four or so feet between them feels so tangible and electric, it's almost like a third instrument."

=== All the Sides (2014) and touring ===
The duo played 11 shows in January 2014 alone on a tour of the South, and in early February they performed a Key Studio Session at WXPN 88.5. Shortly afterwards they opened for the Sub Pop noise rock band Pissed Jeans at Union Transfer in Philadelphia.

In February 2014 they went into the studio to begin recording their third album, All the Sides, which was recorded and mixed by BJ Howze at Red Planet studios. The duo released the album on December 9, 2014. It was made available on CD and vinyl by SRA Records, as well as through Tank Records on cassette tape.

About the album's tone, Foglizzo has stated in an interview that "There's not really anger or sadness. [It's] maybe contemplative. And it feels like there's space — musical, creative, physical, emotional space — which is why we [will call] it All the Sides." Tom Tom Magazine wrote that the album "begins with a chamber rock chorale of 'no warning' in 'Breakdown' along with structured metallic clangs and minor key orchestration reminiscent of Fugazi era discordance... Heavily instrumental, the eight songs master complicated and deliberate time sequences, crashing in hard after operatic pauses." Wrote the Cabildo Quarterly, "This Philly two-piece painstakingly crafts their mini-epics of bombast and nuance, and they do it by (get this) listening to each other."

=== Body Camera/Where is North digital ep (2015) ===
In 2015, the duo released two songs in a digital only format – "Body Camera" and "Where is North" – recorded and mixed by Dan Morse and mastered by Devin Ocampo. WXPN 88.5 wrote of the release that it was "filled with expressive guitar-drum compositions and meditative vocals." The band noted that "Body Camera" was written in solidarity with the Black Lives Matter movement following the death of Eric Garner.

The EP was the recommended release of the week at Radio Static Philly, which praised how the "EP allows the songs to grow and breath." The Deli Magazine wrote that "Body Camera" "stirs in a grey-clouded melodic anticipation with vocal harmony easing the heart rate," while "Where is North” "is a measure of controlled restraint, momentarily demonstrating turbulent potential with a steady hand."

== Style ==
"[Foglizzo and I] have intense, and sometimes jarring, important conversations to try to make sense of the world. We write lyrics together, in practice – no matter how long it takes – and describe the reasons why we opted to write lyrics to each other." — Katy Otto (2010)

The band's style encompasses a number of genres, notably post-hardcore and punk, and has changed somewhat between albums. According to WXPN 88.5 in 2014, "There are hints of metal, prog, noise and experimental music in their blend, and the dynamic sounds they create [are] perfect for underscoring thought-provoking lyrical topics."

They write the music and lyrics as a duo, with diverse topics. About their first album, Sadie Magazine wrote, "They share personal stories with political ramifications and engage the audience in the conversation." While lyrics periodically address feminist issues, the band does not associate itself with a gendered subgenre. Some lyrics are written in French and German, reflecting their respective ancestry.

== Members ==
- Diane Foglizzo – guitar, vocals, piano
- Katy Otto – drums, vocals, xylophone

== Discography ==
=== Albums ===
Year	Album title	Release details
2010	Patience Fury	Released: July 22, 2010; Label: 307 Knox Records; Format: Vinyl, CD, digital
2012	Sing What Scares You	Released: June 1, 2012; Label: 307 Knox/Meet Your Adversary; Format: Vinyl, CD, digital
2014	All the Sides	Released: Dec 9, 2014; Label: Dead Tank Records/SRA Records; Format: Vinyl, CD, digital, tape

=== EPs ===
Year	EP title	Release details
2009	Trophy Wife S/T	Released: 2009; Label: Exotic Fever (EXF036); Format: Cassette
2015	Body Camera/Where is North EP	Released: Sept 7, 2015; Label: Meet Your Adversary Records; Format: Digital download

=== Singles ===
Year	Title	Album	Release details
2012	"Identifiers"	Sing What Scares You	307 Knox (June 1, 2012)
2014	"Breakdown"	All The Sides	SRA Records (May 28, 2014)
2015	"Body Camera"	Body Camera/Where is North EP	Meet Your Adversary (Sept 7, 2015)
2015	"Where is North"	Body Camera/Where is North EP	Meet Your Adversary (Sept 7, 2015)

=== Compilations ===
- 2009: Gimme Cooties - two live tracks
