= Document 8 =

Document #8

Studio album by Pg. 99
- Released: June 13, 2001
- Recorded: at God City studios
- Genres: Screamo; emoviolence; hardcore punk
- Length: 20:28
- Label: Robotic Empire
- Producer: Kurt Ballou

Pg. 99 chronology
Document #7 (2001)	Document #8 (2001)	Document #9: A Split Personality (2001)

Alternate cover
- Reissue cover art (2005)

Professional ratings
Review scores
Source	Rating
AllMusic	4.5/5 stars
Kerrang!	4/5 stars
Sputnikmusic (2005)	(5/5)
Sputnikmusic (2007)	(4.5/5)

Document #8 is the third studio album by the American screamo band Pg. 99. The album was originally released as a vinyl LP on June 13, 2001, through Robotic Empire, with various versions also be released through Electric Human Project and Scene Police. A remixed and remastered edition was released in 2005 through Robotic Empire on CD with two additional bonus tracks, "The Lonesome Waltz of Leonard Cohen" and "The List", the latter being a Filth cover. Both tracks were previously released on Document #9: A Split Personality.

The band reunited in 2011 after eight years and performed Document #8 in its entirety during Best Friends Day in Richmond, Virginia. Document #8 was also reissued on vinyl in 2011.

== Track listing ==
No.	Title	Length
1.	"In Love with an Apparition"	3:46
2.	"Your Face Is a Rape Scene"	2:57
3.	"Life in a Box"	1:38
4.	"We Left as Skeletons"	1:29
5.	"Punk Rock in the Wrong Hands"	2:51
6.	"Ballad of Circling Vultures"	1:55
7.	"The Hollowed Out Chest of a Dead Horse"	5:49

Reissue bonus tracks
No.	Title	Length
8.	"The Lonesome Waltz of Leonard Cohen"	3:53
9.	"The List" (Filth cover)	2:49
Total length:		27:10

== Personnel ==
Pg.99

- Johnny Ward - drums
- Mike Casto - guitar
- George Crum - guitar
- Mike Taylor - guitar
- Cory Stevenson - bass
- Brandon Evans - bass, vocals
- Blake Midgette - vocals
- Chris Taylor - vocals

Additional personnel

- Kurt Ballou – production
- Chris Taylor – artwork
- Andy Low – layout
- Fil – photographs
- Hugel – photographs
- Olli B. – photographs
