= Keep Singing! A Benefit Compilation for Compassion Over Killing =

Compilation album by Various artists
- Released: January 29, 2008
- Genre: Alternative rock, punk rock, hardcore punk
- Length: 42:50
- Label: Exotic Fever Records

Keep Singing! A Benefit Compilation for Compassion Over Killing is a benefit album by Exotic Fever Records supporting the non-profit animal rights advocacy group, Compassion Over Killing (now known as Animal Outlook). It compiles fifteen tracks from various (vegan) artists in promotion of the vegan diet. A vegan cookbook is also included with the physical copy of the CD in the liner notes and as a downloadable PDF file, which features favorite recipes from each band. The album was released on January 29, 2008 in CD and digital download format through Exotic Fever Records.

== Track listing ==
1. Gina Young - "To Cool to Cry" 03:37
2. Strike Anywhere - "You Are Not Collateral Damage" 02:36
3. Life at These Speeds - "Waefae" 02:05
4. Attrition - "No Control" 04:12
5. In First Person - "Shades of Gray" 01:36
6. Sean McArdle - "I Go Shopping" 04:31
7. Now Sleepyhead - "Pandemic" 03:15
8. Sinaloa - "To Our End" 03:10
9. Wrong Day to Quit - "Wounds" 03:40
10. Kathy Cashel - "The Human Animal" 03:14
11. The Vonneguts - "Tonight's a Sadist" 03:09
12. Ampere - "Conquest Success" 00:33
13. des ark - "Punks in the Park" 01:29
14. Off Minor - "Abattoir" 01:22
15. Junius - "Lost in Basilica" 04:21
