= Document 12 =

Document #12

Studio album by Pg. 99 and Majority Rule
- Released: July 23, 2002
- Recorded: April 2002
- Studio: Oblivion Studios (Marlboro, Massachusetts)
- Genre: Hardcore punk, screamo, post-hardcore
- Length: 33:30
- Label: Magic Bullet Records
- Producer: Ben Mellot

Pg. 99 chronology
Document #11 (2002)	Document #12 (2002)	Document #13: Pyramids In Cloth (2003)

Majority Rule chronology
Interviews With David Frost (2001)	Document #12 (2002)	Emergency Numbers (2003)

Professional ratings
Review scores
Source	Rating
AllMusic	3/5 stars
Sputnikmusic	4/5 stars

Document #12 is a split album by American screamo bands Pg. 99 and Majority Rule, originally released on CD on July 23, 2002, under the Magic Bullet Records. The LP edition of the album first became available on October 9 of the same year. It is noted for showing Pg. 99 experimenting with melody more than on their previous releases.

== Track listing ==
Pg.99 side
No.	Title	Length
1.	"Friendship"	1:51
2.	"Tantrum"	3:21
3.	"Richmond Is a Hole"	4:38
4.	"Faces Sunken By Letting Go"	2:00
5.	"Virginia"	5:11

Majority Rule side
No.	Title	Length
6.	"Not In My Name"	4:54
7.	"These Hands"	3:27
8.	"My Version of Paris"	3:21
9.	"Packaged Poison"	4:53

== Personnel ==
Pg.99

- Blake Midgette – vocals
- Brandon Evans – bass, vocals
- Chris Taylor – vocals
- George Crum – guitar
- Johnny Ward – drums
- Johnathan Moore – guitar
- Kevin Longendyke – bass
- Mike Taylor – guitar

Majority Rule

- Kevin Lamiell – bass, vocals
- Matt Michel – guitar, vocals
- Pat Broderick – drums

Production

- Chris Taylor – artwork
- Matt Michel – layout, photography
- Ben Mellot – production
- Mike Bossier – recording
