= Infant Island (album) =

Studio album by Infant Island
- Released: August 1, 2018
- Genre: Screamo; post-hardcore; shoegaze
- Length: 26:49
- Label: Middle-Man; Conditions; Dingleberry; Zegema Beach; Left Hand Label
- Producer: Thomas Carney

Infant Island chronology
Infant Island (2018)	Sepulcher (2020)

Infant Island is the debut studio album by American screamo band Infant Island. The album was released on August 1, 2018, through Middle-Man Records, Conditions Records, and Dingleberry Records. It was produced by Thomas Carney in Richmond, Virginia. Several songs from the album are re-recordings of songs which originally appeared on miscellaneous split EPs from years prior. The album was critically acclaimed at the time of its release, and was described as delivering "new life to screamo" by The Washington Post.

== Track listing ==
No.	Title	Length
1.	"Small Differences"	2:47
2.	"Replenish"	3:17
3.	"Broken Pieces"	4:12
4.	"Fall"	3:52
5.	"Diminish"	1:40
6.	"A Preoccupation"	4:09
7.	"Further"	6:52
Total length:		26:49

Cassette version
No.	Title	Length
1.	"Small Differences"	2:47
2.	"Replenish"	3:17
3.	"Broken Pieces"	4:12
4.	"Fall"	3:52
5.	"Diminish"	1:40
6.	"A Preoccupation"	4:09
7.	"Further"	6:52
8.	"Where There Is Ruin" (Bonus Track)	6:32
Total length:		33:21

== Personnel ==
Infant Island personnel adapted from LP liner notes.

=== Infant Island ===
- Daniel Kost – vocals
- Alexander Rudenshiold – guitar, vocals
- Kyle Guerra – bass
- James Rakestraw – drums

=== Additional Instrumentation ===
- Mark Boulanger – field recording
- Drake Dragone – violin
- Grace Howie – cello
- Alexander Rudenshiold – celestette, grand piano
- Austin O’Rourke – grand piano, upright piano, bowed glockenspiel, tape processing

=== Technical Credits ===
- Thomas Carney – engineering, recording, mixing, mastering
- Drake Dragone – overdub engineering
