= Se hace por los suenos asesinos =

Studio album by Corrupted
- Released: January 17, 2004
- Genre: Doom metal
- Length: 35:23
- Label: HG Fact

Corrupted chronology
La victima es tu mismo (2001)	Se hace por los suenos asesinos (2004)	El mundo frio (2005)

Se hace por los suenos asesinos is the third full-length studio album by Japanese doom metal band Corrupted. It was released on January 17, 2004 on vinyl limited to 1000 copies, and again on April 16, 2004 on limited-edition CD.

The title is Spanish for "It Is Done for Assassin Dreams", although the technical Spanish translation for "dreams" is sueños, not suenos; the tilde was left off the title.

== Critical reception ==
Arnstein Petersen of Doom-metal.com concluded his review by writing, "My own personal verdict is that, despite the ambient track and the short duration, if you want to get a couple of really nice sludge/doom tracks, then give this one a shot."

== Track listing ==
No.	Title	Length
1.	"Gekkou no Daichi" ("月光の大地", lit. "Ground of Moonlight")	17:02
2.	"Rato triste" (lit. "Sad Time")	10:44
3.	"Sus futuros" (lit. "Their Futures")	7:37
Total length:		35:23

== Personnel ==
- Talbot – acoustic guitar, electric guitar
- Yokota – bass guitar, acoustic guitar
- Chew Hasegawa – drums
- Hevi – vocals, acoustic guitar
