= El mundo frio =

Studio album by Corrupted
- Released: September 29, 2005
- Recorded: August–December 2003
- Venue: Osaka, Japan
- Studio: Omega Sound and LM Studio
- Genre: Doom metal; sludge metal; post-rock
- Length: 71:39
- Label: HG Fact

Corrupted chronology
Se hace por los suenos asesinos (2004)	El mundo frio (2005)	An Island Insane / Vasana (2007)

Professional ratings
Review scores
Source	Rating
Allmusic	2.5/5 stars
SF Weekly	(favorable)

El mundo frio is the fourth full-length studio album by Japanese doom metal band Corrupted. The album consists of a single, continuous 71-minute song. The instrumentation is notable for inclusion of the Western harp.

The title is Spanish for "The Cold World", albeit with the accent over frío left off.

== Musical style ==
After the brief detour of the previous album Se hace por los suenos asesinos, the guitars in the album's final third ceased to be as doomy and distorted as they’d been, and almost shifted into post-rock, as vocalist Hevi began to recite the lyrics in a hoarse, earnest whisper rather than his usual bestial roar.

== Track listing ==
No.	Title	Length
1.	"El mundo frio"	71:39
Total length:		71:39

== Personnel ==
- Talbot – acoustic guitar, electric guitar
- Yokota – bass guitar, electric guitar
- Chew Hasegawa – drums
- Hevi – vocals
- Anri – harp
- Masahiko Ono – artwork
- Ippei Suda – engineering
