= Provisions Library =

Library at George Mason University, Fairfax, Virginia, United States

Coordinates: 38°54′57″N 77°2′43″W

Provisions Library is a library located at George Mason University in Fairfax, Virginia. The library has over 6000 books, magazines, DVDs, and videos all centered on social change and the arts.

In addition to serving as a resource center, Provisions focuses on the arts as a central means for amplifying social engagement in a variety of arenas. Provisions collaborates on curation projects, and it has held over 25 exhibitions of socially engaged art. The library has focused on curating traveling art exhibitions with partner institutions since 2008.

Provisions Library was founded in 2001 as a project of the GAEA Foundation. It moved to Dupont Circle in Washington, DC in 2003. As of 2011, the Provisions Library research center is housed at George Mason University, and its executive director is Donald Russell.
