= Paso inferior =

Studio album by Corrupted
- Released: 1997
- Recorded: October–November 1996, Yotsubashi LM Studio, Osaka, Japan; November 1996, Studio 610, Kyoto, Japan
- Genre: Drone metal Sludge metal
- Length: 41:46
- Label: Frigidity Discos

Corrupted chronology
Nadie (1995)	Paso inferior (1997)	Dios injusto (1999)

Vinyl cover

Paso inferior is the first full-length studio album by Japanese doom metal band Corrupted. The album is a single track which is approximately 42 minutes long.

The album was originally released on CD by Corrupted's own label Frigidity Discos. It was re-released on vinyl in 2002 and 2008 by Insolito, and again on CD in 2008 by Nostalgia Blackrain.

The title is Spanish for "Underpass". The title is Latin for "Lower Step".

== Track listing ==
Original

No.	Title	Length
1.	"Paso inferior"	41:46

12" LP

No.	Title	Length
1.	"Paso inferior I"	14:39
2.	"Paso inferior II"	15:48
Total length:		30:27

== Personnel ==
- Talbot – guitar
- Jose – bass guitar
- Chew Hasegawa – drums
- Hevi – vocals
- Masahiko Ohno – artwork
- Ippei Suda – engineering
- Ryo Watanabe – engineering
