= Enemy Soil (band) =

American grindcore band

- Origin: Sterling, Virginia, U.S.
- Genres: Grindcore, hardcore punk
- Years active: 1991–1999; 2001, 2017–2024 (reunions)
- Labels: Selfmadegod, Bones Brigade, Relapse, Clean Plate, Profane Existence Far East, Insolito, Slap-a-Ham
- Members: Richard Johnson; J.R. Hayes; Adam Perry; Russ Mason
- Past members: Cory Stevenson; Jeff Kane; Brian Harvey; Omid Yamini; T.L. Smoot; Doshu Tokeshi; Shane Privette; Criag Lenc; Tim Caicedo
- Website: enemysoil.drugsoffaith.com

Enemy Soil was an American grindcore band from Sterling, Virginia, formed in 1991. The band played a style of grindcore that was influenced heavily by hardcore punk, and featured many line-up changes throughout its run, with frontman Richard Johnson acting as its core. Because the group initially was unable to find a suitable drummer, earlier Enemy Soil recordings featured a drum machine. The group's music was also politically-motivated early in their career, however later recordings instead featured introspective topics for lyrics.

The group eventually broke up in the spring of 1999 after releasing numerous splits and records. Members went on to form or join many bands, including Pig Destroyer, Pg. 99, and Agoraphobic Nosebleed, among others. French label Bones Brigade Records issued the two-disc compilation Smashes the State! in 2001, containing most of the band's discography, excluding the Casualties of Progress extended play. The group reformed in 2001 for a special one-off reunion show at CBGB in New York City. Footage from this show, as well as shows dating between 1996 and 1998, was released on the 2009 Selfmadegod live DVD Smashes the State Live.

In June 2017, the band announced via the official Enemy Soil website that the group has reformed for a few reunion shows, including an appearance at Maryland Deathfest 2018.

== Members ==
=== Current ===
- Richard Johnson – guitar (1991–1999, 2001, 2017–present), bass, vocals (1998–1999)
- Adam Perry – drums (1997–1999, 2017–present)
- J.R. Hayes – vocals (1996–1997, 2017–present)
- Mason – bass, vocals (1991–1992, 1993–1996, 1997–1998, 2017–present)

=== Previous ===
- Cory Stevenson – bass (1998)
- T.L. Smoot – vocals (1998)
- Jeff Kane – bass (1997–1998), guitar (2001)
- Omid Yamini – bass (1997, 2001)
- Brian Harvey – bass (1995–1996), drums (1996–1997, 2001)
- Doshu Tokeshi – vocals (1993–1996)
- Shane Privette – vocals (1993, 1995)
- Tim Caicedo – vocals (1993)
- Mark Lee – vocals (1993)
- Criag Lenc – bass (1993)

== Discography ==
=== Extended plays ===
- Casualties of Progress 7-inch (1995, Relapse) (reissued on CD with bonus tracks in 2008)
- War Parade 7-inch (1996, Slap-a-Ham)
- The Ruins of Eden 10-inch (1997, Insolito) (released on CD with bonus tracks in the US through Clean Plate)
- Fractured Theology 3" CD (1998, Profane Existence Far East) (reissued on 12-inch vinyl through Drop Out)

=== Splits ===
- Split cassette with Parasitic Infestation (1993, Open Eye)
- Split 7-inch with Wadge (1994, Break It Out)
- Split 7-inch with Desperate Corruption (1996, Bovine)
- Split cassette with Abstain (1997, Noise Induced Deafness)
- Split 7-inch with Reversal of Man (1997, Fist Held High)
- Split 7-inch with Agoraphobic Nosebleed (1997, Bovine)
- Split 7-inch with Corrupted (1997, HG Fact)
- Document #2 split 7-inch with Pg. 99 (1999, Sacapuntas)

=== Live releases ===
- Live at Fiesta Grande #5 flexi 7-inch (1997, Clean Plate)
- Live in Virginia 7-inch (1998, Dwie Strony Medalu/Czarny Kot)
- Smashes the State Live DVD (2009, Selfmadegod)

=== Compilation albums ===
- Smashes the State! 2xCD (2001, Bones Brigade)
