= Louisa Solomon =

American musician and activist

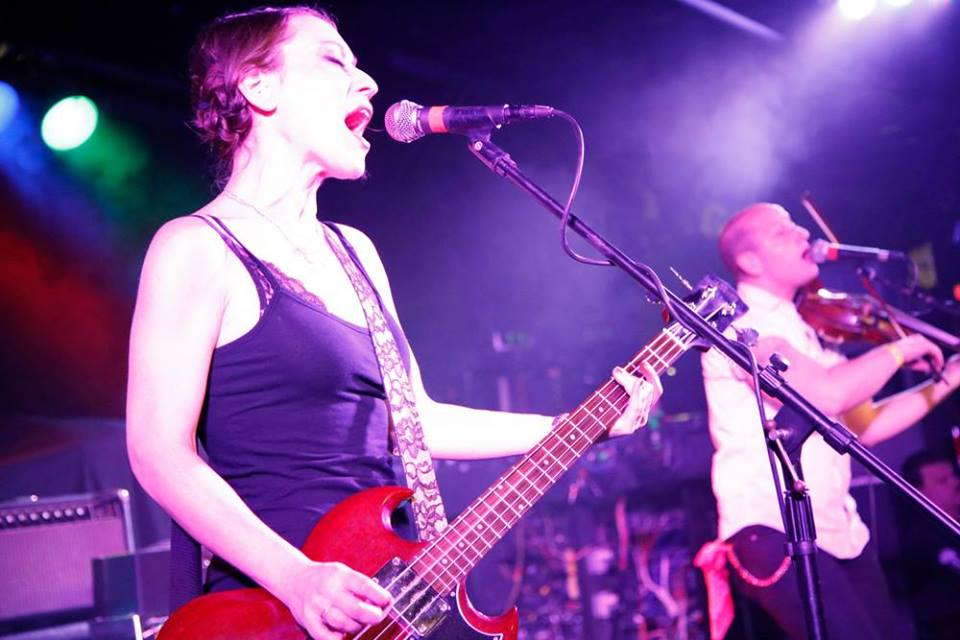
Performing at the Stone Pony on tour with Against Me! in 2014

Louisa Rachel Solomon is the lead singer of The Shondes, an indie punk band from Brooklyn, NY. Solomon, a rabbi-in-training from Queens, is known for being a Jewish musician who is outspoken about opposing the occupation of Palestine.

== Early life and education ==
Solomon grew up in a Jewish home in upstate New York. She attended the Eugene Lang College of Liberal Arts at The New School in New York City, graduating in 2005. Following the September 11 attacks, she was involved in activism against Islamophobia.

As of 2024, Solomon is studying to become a rabbi at the Reconstructionist Rabbinical College and expects to be ordained when she completes her degree in 2025. For a brief time in 2023, she served as the student rabbi at The New School. Soon after October 7, Solomon was observed holding a sign on campus that expressed support for an "intifada" against Israel and participated in a rally in Brooklyn where a ceasefire was called for and Israel was accused of genocide. In June 2024 it was announced that Solomon was no longer employed by The New School.

== Career ==
Vocalist and bassist Solomon formed the band The Shondes with violinist Elijah Oberman in 2006.

In 2014, Solomon's rejection of Zionism led to cancellation of The Shondes' scheduled performance at a DCJCC event. The JCC revoked its sponsorship due to her visit to the West Bank and public support for the Boycott, Divestment and Sanctions movement.

== Reviews ==
AfterEllen compared Solomon's vocals to Corin Tucker of Sleater-Kinney. Depth of Field Magazine called her voice "nothing short of breathtaking...giving the impression that she's speaking directly to each and every individual listener." Performer Magazine's review of The Red Sea praised Solomon's vigorous vocals on the first half of the album, but criticized their monotony as the album progressed.

== Personal life ==
Solomon self-identifies as queer. She has a tattoo of a Hebrew letter on her wrist, and has described herself as "a proud Jew, a committed Jew". She has two children, whom she brought along to an October 2023 rally organized by the group Jewish Voice for Peace, calling for the U.S. government to push for a cease-fire in the Gaza war.
