= Sepulcher (album) =

Studio album by Infant Island
- Released: April 17, 2020
- Recorded: December 2019 – March 2020
- Genre: Screamo; black metal; post-rock
- Length: 25:11
- Label: Acrobat Unstable; Left Hand Label; Zegema Beach
- Producer: Infant Island; Michael Toney

Infant Island chronology
| Infant Island (2018) | Sepulcher (2020) | Beneath (2020) |

Sepulcher is the second studio album (Note: Marketed as a "mini-LP".) by the American screamo band Infant Island. It was released without previous announcement on April 17, 2020, through Acrobat Unstable Records, Left Hand Label, and Zegema Beach Records. It was self-produced by the band, with help from Michael Toney of the mathcore band Black Matter Device.

The album was critically acclaimed at the time of its release, often mentioned in conjunction with the band's next album Beneath due to their close release dates. The final listed track, "Awoken," was particularly praised, with music critic Ian Cohen writing in Pitchfork that it was "the kind of stunning, 10-minute scorched-earth aerial view that every screamo band tries to make."

== Track listing ==
| No. | Title | Length |
|---|---|---|
| 1. | "Burrow" | 2:30 |
| 2. | "Unspoken" | 5:14 |
| 3. | "Phantom Whines" | 2:11 |
| 4. | "Awoken" | 9:59 |
| 5. | "Sepulcher (hidden track)" | 5:17 |
| Total length: | | 25:11 |

== Personnel ==
Sepulcher personnel adapted from LP liner notes.

=== Infant Island ===
- Daniel Kost – vocals
- Alexander Rudenshiold – guitar, vocals
- Winston Givler – guitar, vocals
- Kyle Guerra – bass, vocals
- Austin O’Rourke – drums

=== Additional Instrumentation ===
- Michael Toney – vocals

=== Technical Credits ===
- Michael Toney – primary engineering, recording, and preliminary mixing
- Kyle Guerra – vocal engineering and recording
- Austin O'Rourke – primary mixing
- Brad Boatright – mastering

Artistic Credits

- Alexander Rudenshiold – layout, design
