= Trophy (disambiguation) =

A trophy is an award of mostly symbolic value, earned by the winner of a competition.

Trophy or trophies may also refer to:

- Trophy wife, a term commonly used to describe any wife who is considered a status symbol
- Trophy (architectural), an architectural ornament
- PlayStation Network Trophies, awards for achieving goals in PlayStation video games (introduced with the PlayStation 3)
- Tropaion or tropaeum, ancient Roman victory monument or trophy
  - Tropaeum Traiani, the Trophy of Trajan, in modern Romania
  - Tropaeum Alpium, the Trophy of the Alps, in modern France
- War trophy, property seized from the enemy as a result of a military victory
- Trophy hunting, an item, such as a stuffed bear or a deer head, kept by a hunter as a souvenir of the successful hunt
- Trophy (countermeasure), an Israeli military vehicle active protection system Me'il Ruach, also called Windbreaker, currently fitted to the Merkava 4 MBT and Namer heavy IFV
- Tropaeum, a genus of cephalopod mollusca
- Trophy Mountain, a mountain in British Columbia, Canada
- a 6-row malting barley variety

== Arts and entertainment ==
=== Film and television ===
- Trophy (film), a 2017 American documentary about trophy hunting
- "Trophy" (The Shield), a 2006 television episode

=== Music ===
- Trophy (Made Out of Babies album), 2005
- Trophy (Sunny Sweeney album), 2017
- Trophies (Apollo Brown and O.C. album), 2012
- Trophies, an album by Paper Lions, 2010
- "Trophy", a song by Bat for Lashes from Fur and Gold, 2006
- "Trophy", a song by Charli XCX from Vroom Vroom, 2016
- "Trophies" (song), by Drake, 2014
- "Trophies", a song by Cardi B from Am I the Drama?, 2025
- "Trophies", by Moka Only and Def3 from Dog River, 2007
