= Pygmy Lush =

American rock band

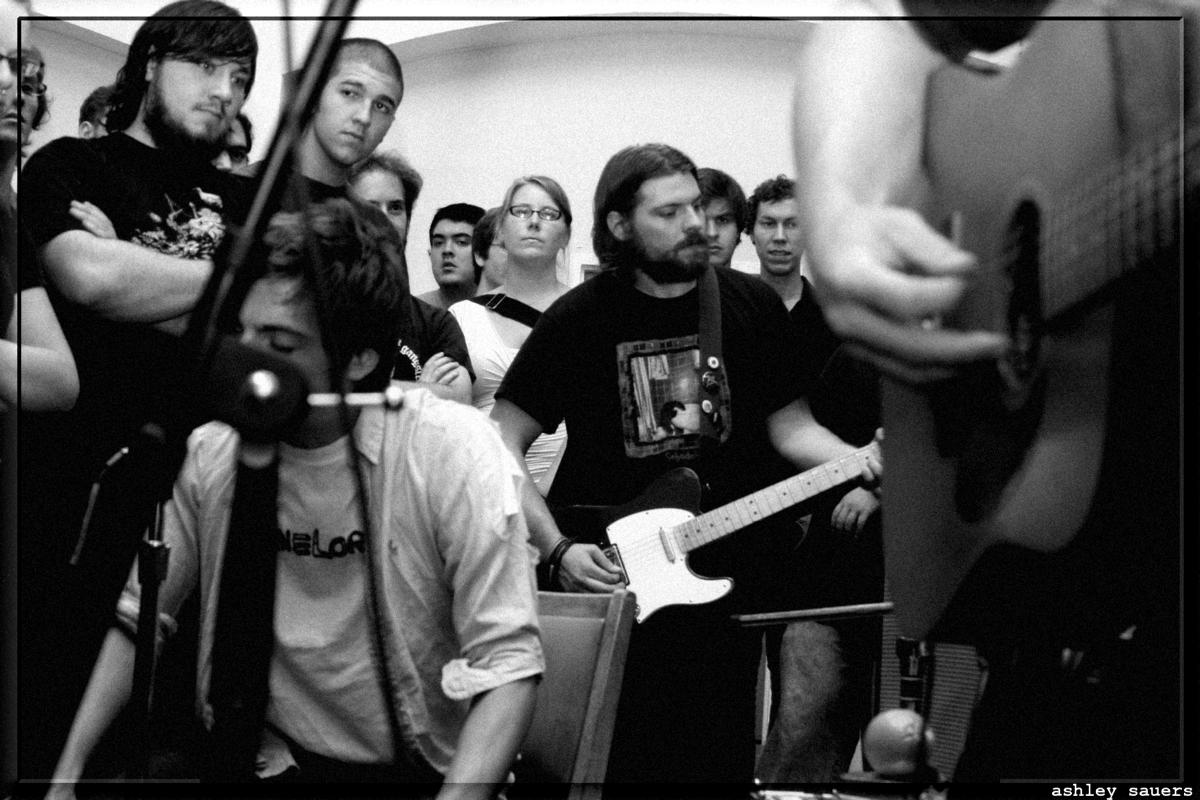

Background information
- Origin: Sterling, Virginia
- Genres: Folk, experimental, hardcore punk
- Years active: 2004–present
- Labels: Robotic Empire; Lovitt Records; Adagio 830; Exotic Fever
- Members: Mike Taylor; Chris Taylor; Johnny Ward; Mike Widman; Eric Kane

Pygmy Lush (sometimes spelled as one word) is a band from Sterling, Virginia formed by ex-Pg. 99 members Mike and Chris Taylor and Johnny Ward. Other members include Mike Widman and Eric Kane, and previous associated acts include Malady, Mannequin, and Hissing Choir, amongst many others.

In 2007, they released an album of previously and newly recorded material on Robotic Empire entitled Bitter River. The songs alternate between two general styles, noise punk and acoustic folk, described by one reviewer as "ramshackle trashy punk rave-ups between beer-soaked bouts of twisted folk”.

In June 2008, they released their second album, Mount Hope, which was recorded by Kurt Ballou (Converge, who has contributed to most of their releases) of Godcity Studio and released on Lovitt Records. This album consisted entirely of quieter, folk style songs. Various reviewers described the album as a "metamorphosis" and that the band "has grown up and into a new sound... leav[ing] hardcore behind" to describe the stylistic evolution of the band.

Their 2009 split LP with Turboslut is available on LP from Exotic Fever Records of Washington, DC. In 2011, they released a new full length, Old Friends and a two song 7" entitled Cold World / Guilt. In 2025, they released the new studio album Totem.

== Discography ==
=== Studio albums ===
- Bitter River (2007, Robotic Empire)
- Mount Hope (2008, Lovitt)
- Old Friends (2011, Lovitt)
- Totem (2025, Persistent Vision)

=== Singles ===
- "Cold World/Guilt" 7" (2011, Lovitt)

=== EPs ===
- Split 12" with Turboslut (2009, Exotic Fever)
- 4 Unreleased Live Songs (2010, Robotic Obscurites) (released online through the Robotic Obscurites blog)
- My, My, My (2012, self-released) early demos released through the official Pygmy Lush Tumblr page)

=== Compilation contributions ===
- "Serve the Servants" (originally by Nirvana; tribute album In Utero, in Tribute, in Entirety) (2014, Robotic Empire)
- "On a Plain" (originally by Nirvana; tribute album Whatever Nevermind) (2015, Robotic Empire)

sampler 2014, Robotic Empire
