= Majority Rule (band) =

American hardcore punk band

- Origin: Northern Virginia, U.S.
- Genres: Screamo; hardcore punk
- Years active: 1996–2004; 2017–present
- Labels: Magic Bullet; Dark Operative
- Members: Matt Michel; Kevin Lamiell; Pat Broderick
- Past members: Brian Mahoney; Andy Overton
- Website: majrule.com

Majority Rule is an American hardcore punk band from Northern Virginia, originally active between 1996 and 2004. Influential within the screamo subgenre, their releases include the studio albums Interviews with David Frost (2001) and Emergency Numbers (2003) and the split album Document #12 (2002) with Pg. 99. The band reunited in 2017, performing benefit shows with Pg. 99 and City of Caterpillar.

== History ==
=== Early work (1996–2000) ===
Majority Rule formed in 1996 as a four-piece. While they initially performed fairly straightforward hardcore punk, they gained more recognition after transitioning towards screamo. In a 2003 interview, frontman Matt Michel called this transition "a natural change". The band's early releases were: splits with Positive State, Turbine, and the Blackout Terror; the EPs Majority Rule (1999) and Songs (2000); and debut studio album Half the Battle (1996).

=== Later work (2001–2004) ===
In 2001, Majority Rule's lineup stabilized as a three-piece—comprising guitarist and vocalist Matt Michel, bassist and vocalist Kevin Lamiell, and drummer Pat Broderick—and they released their second album Interviews with David Frost. A year later, it was followed by a split album with fellow Virginia band Pg. 99, titled Document #12. In 2003, the band released its final album Emergency Numbers before breaking up in 2004. In a 2005 interview, Michel said: "I just think we all have some pretty different ideas on why the band had to end and when the band really ended."

=== Reunion (2017–present) ===
In 2017 Majority Rule reunited to play a string of benefit shows across the Eastern United States with Pg. 99 and City of Caterpillar (a band which Broderick had also played drums in). Michel stated that they decided to join after seeing City of Caterpillar and Malady perform and being contacted by Pg. 99 vocalist Chris Taylor. These initial shows quickly sold out and raised over $36,000 for local non-profits.

In 2019, Pg 99 and Majority Rule reunited to tour the West Coast with Portrayal of Guilt. They repeated their success, selling out all dates and raising over $28,000 for local grassroots organizations (according to a statement posted on Majority Rule's website).

== Impact ==
In a 2019 interview with Revolver, Portrayal of Guilt frontman Matt King directly attributed the inception of his band to Majority Rule, Pg. 99, and City of Caterpillar, stating: "That's [what] I was into before anything else, before I could have a deathcore or a scene phase or whatever." Touché Amoré, Infant Island, and Wristmeetrazor have also named Majority Rule as an inspiration.

== Discography ==
=== Studio albums ===
| Title | Album details | Comments |
|---|---|---|
| Half the Battle | Released: 1996; Labels: Two One Nine; Formats: Cassette | |
| Interviews with David Frost | Released: May 8, 2001; Labels: Magic Bullet; Formats: DL, CD, 12" LP | |
| Document #12 | Released: July 23, 2002; Labels: Magic Bullet; Formats: DL, CD, 12" LP | split with Pg. 99 |
| Emergency Numbers | Released: July 15, 2003; Labels: Magic Bullet; Formats: DL, CD, 12" LP | |

=== EPs ===
| Title | Album details | Comments |
|---|---|---|
| Partners in Profit | Released: 1997; Labels: Submit; Formats: 7" | split with Positive State |
| Turbine / Majority Rule | Released: 1998; Labels: Submit; Formats: 7" | split with Turbine |
| Majority Rule | Released: 1999; Labels: Submit; Formats: 7" | |
| Songs | Released: 2000; Labels: Self-released; Formats: CDr, DL, 10" | reissued in 2017 by Quit Life before Majority Rule's reunion dates with Pg. 99 |
| The Blackout Terror / Majority Rule | Released: 2000; Labels: American Dream 101; Formats: 7" | split with the Blackout Terror |
