= Trophy Wife (Boston band) =

American alt-rock band

- Origin: Allston, MA, United States
- Genres: Alt-rock, indie rock
- Years active: 2018–present
- Label: AWAL (distributor)
- Members: McKenzie Iazzetta; Christian Pace; Mena Lamos; Michael Martelli

Trophy Wife is an American indie rock band based in Brooklyn, New York. Founded in Boston, Massachusetts in 2018 when founder McKenzie Iazzetta was attending Berklee College of Music. Its members are vocalist McKenzie Iazzetta, guitarist Christian Pace, bassist Mena Lamos and drummer Michael Martelli. They have released two full albums: Get Ugly (2024) and Pathetic (2026).

== History ==
Trophy Wife's debut album, Get Ugly, was met with acclaim in 2024, and was released amidst the band's move from Boston to Brooklyn. In 2025, the band was showcased on Audiotree Live.

In 2026, shortly before the release of their second studio album, Pathetic, the band performed at SXSW.

Trophy Wife has opened for artists including The Beaches, Girlpuppy, and Skegss.

== Style ==
Iazzetta is the primary songwriter for the group, and lists influences including Yeah Yeah Yeahs, Tori Amos and Xiu Xiu. Critics have described Iazzetta's lyrics as "blunt" and "earthy", with "gloomy confessional" topics, and the band as having 90s grunge influences, including abrasive and distorted instrumentation. The band originated in the DIY scene in Boston, which influenced their sound. The band is often compared to Wednesday and Blondshell.

== Members ==
- McKenzie Iazzetta – vocals
- Christian Pace – guitar
- Mena Lamos – bass
- Michael Martelli – drums

== Discography ==
=== Albums ===
Year	Album title	Release details
2024	Get Ugly	Released: October 4, 2024; Format: Digital
2026	Pathetic	Released: July 10, 2026; Label: AWAL (distributor); Format: Vinyl, digital

=== EPs ===
Year	Album title	Release details
2021	Bruiser	Released: July 30, 2021; Format: Digital
2022	Voyeur	Released: November 15, 2022; Format: Digital
2024	Spit	Released: August 9, 2024; Format: Digital
2024	Swamp Song	Released: September 6, 2024; Format: Digital

=== Singles ===
- Keep It (2024)
- So Hard (2025)
- Kind of Girl I Am (2026)
- Paragraph (2026)
