= The Shondes =

American rock band

- Origin: Brooklyn, New York, United States
- Genres: Punk rock, riot grrrl, indie rock, pop rock, Jewish rock
- Years active: 2006–present
- Label: Exotic Fever
- Members: Louisa Rachel Solomon; Elijah Oberman; Courtney Robbins; Alex Smith
- Past members: Ian Brannigan; Temim Fruchter; Fureigh; Allison Miller; Fen Ikner; Zachary Toporek; Jim Hefferman
- Website: www.shondes.com

The Shondes is a rock band from Brooklyn, New York, that combines feminist punk, rock, pop, activist, and Jewish influences. The Shondes formed in 2006 and have released two demos and five full-length studio albums.

== Releases and tours ==
=== The Red Sea (2008-2010) ===
After national tours in summer 2006, spring 2007, and late 2007, The Shondes self-released their debut LP, The Red Sea, on January 8, 2008, and held a record release party at Brooklyn's Luna Lounge. The album was recorded at Studio G in Brooklyn, NY and produced by Tony Maimone and features Brian Dewan on keyboards.

=== My Dear One and Searchlights (2010-2012) ===
Following that tour, guitarist Ian Brannigan left the band and was replaced by Fureigh. The new lineup made its debut at JDub Records' annual "Jewltide" Christmas Eve party at Southpaw in Brooklyn, NY. In May 2010, the Shondes released their second album My Dear One on Fanatic Records. They toured nationally to support it that year, beginning at South By Southwest in March throughout the Spring. Culture Snob and Stomp and Stammer described it as a break-up album about guitarist Ian Brannigan.

=== The Garden and Brighton (2012-present) ===
They toured Europe throughout the Fall of 2012, sponsored by Missy magazine, trying out material for a new album. In April 2013, they announced the departure of founding drummer, Temim Fruchter, and the entrance of Allison Miller for the band's fourth record, The Garden, which was released September 17, 2013 on Exotic Fever Records, and again produced by Tony Maimone at Brooklyn, NY's Studio G. The Garden release tour was Fureigh's last with the band, and Fen Ikner stepped in on drums. In December 2013, the band announced they would be joining Against Me! for their record release tour in January 2014, joined by Zach Toporek on guitar and Jim Heffernan on drums.

Their fourth studio album The Garden was released in 2013 on Exotic Fever Records, and produced by Tony Maimone at Brooklyn, NY's Studio G. The band toured with Against Me! in January 2014, and went on a headlining national tour in Winter/Spring 2015.

Following the tour, the band settled into a more permanent lineup consisting of the founding duo (Solomon and Oberman), new guitarist Courtney Robbins, and drummer Alex Smith. This new lineup went into the studio to record The Shondes fifth studio album from January–March 2016.

In June 2016, the band announced the new record, Brighton, would be released on September 17, 2016 on Exotic Fever Records.

== Jewish cultural influence ==
The band has organized and performed at benefit events for progressive organizations like Birthright Unplugged, Jews Against the Occupation, ASWAT, Jewish Voice for Peace, and The Sylvia Rivera Law Project. The Red Sea features the explicitly political song "I Watched the Temple Fall." The band has said they wrote it collaboratively very early on, and that it arose from conversations about the meaning of the Jewish holiday Tisha B'Av. Members of the band worked with the New York City group Jews Against the Occupation. Since its inception, the band has stirred controversy for the members' outspoken radical politics, particularly those centered around the Israeli-Palestinian conflict. In 2014, the D.C. Jewish Community Center cancelled an invitation for The Shondes after a band member questioned whether the State of Israel had a right to exist.

The Jewish Daily Forward noted their use of klezmer modalities and time signatures.

== Discography ==
- Demo 1 — July 2006
- Demo 2 — March 2007
- The Red Sea — self-released — January 10, 2008
- My Dear One — Fanatic Records — May 8, 2010
- Searchlights — Exotic Fever Records — September 20, 2011
- The Garden — Exotic Fever Records — September 17, 2013
- Brighton — Exotic Fever Records — September 16, 2016
