= City of Caterpillar =

American rock band

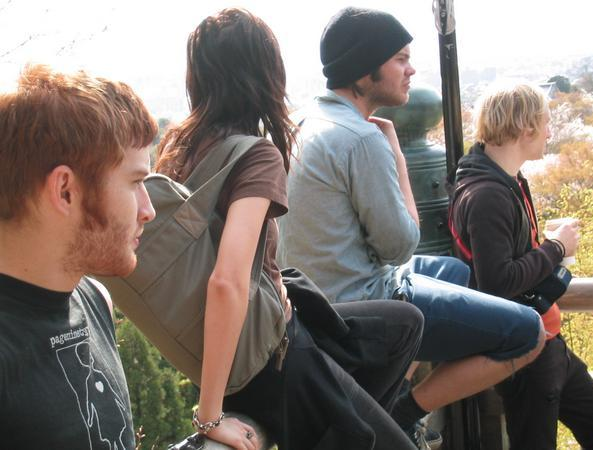

Background information
- Origin: Richmond, Virginia, United States
- Genres: Screamo; post-hardcore; post-rock; hardcore punk
- Years active: 2000–2003, 2016–present
- Label: Level Plane
- Members: Jeff Kane; Brandon Evans; Kevin Longendyke; Ryan Parrish
- Past members: Pat Broderick; Adam Juresko

City of Caterpillar is an American post-hardcore band from Richmond, Virginia, formed in 2000. They have released a split with Pg. 99, two studio albums, and a full-length compilation of demos and live tracks. Their songs, some of which are over 10 minutes long, are often characterized by melodic post-rock passages building up into chaotic outbursts.

City of Caterpillar shared band members with Pg. 99, Darkest Hour, Stop It!!, Enemy Soil, Kilara, Monotonashhfuck, and later Majority Rule. They broke up in December 2003, with Jeff and Kevin going on to join Haram as well as forming the bands Malady and Verse En Coma (the latter also featuring Ryan Parrish), and Brandon and Pat forming Ghastly City Sleep.

The band announced a string of reunion shows across the east coast of the United States in 2016. News of the bands reunion came after Repeater Records reissued their self-titled album. The band also announced a European tour for the summer of 2017 and a Japanese tour in the summer of 2018. City Of Caterpillar announced a new album in August 2022 titled "Mystic Sisters" set to be released on Relapse Records as well as dates for an upcoming tour. Following the announcement Mystic Sisters was released on September 30, 2022.

== Members ==
=== Current members ===
- Brandon Evans – vocals, guitar (2000–2003, 2016–present)
- Jeff Kane – guitar (2000–2003, 2016–present)
- Kevin Longendyke – vocals, bass (2000–2003, 2016–present)
- Ryan Parrish – drums (2000–2002, 2016–present)

=== Past members ===
- Adam Juresko – bass (2000)

=== Touring members ===
- Pat Broderick – drums (2001–2003)

== Discography ==
Studio albums

- City of Caterpillar (2002, Level Plane)
- Mystic Sisters (2022, Relapse Records)

Singles and EPs

- Split 7-inch with System 2600 (2000, Sea of Dead Pirates)
- Document #9: A Split Personality split 7-inch with Pg. 99 (2001, Level Plane)
- Live In New York City (2001, Level Plane)
- Unreleased Demos (2013, Robotic Empire) (released on the Robotic Empire SoundCloud page)
- As the Curtains Dim; (Little White Lie) (2016, Robotic Empire)
- Driving Spain Up a Wall (2017, Repeater Records)

Compilation albums

- Demo and Live Recording (2002, Level Plane)
- Complete Discography (2018, Long Legs Long Arms)
