= Pg. 99 =

American hardcore punk band

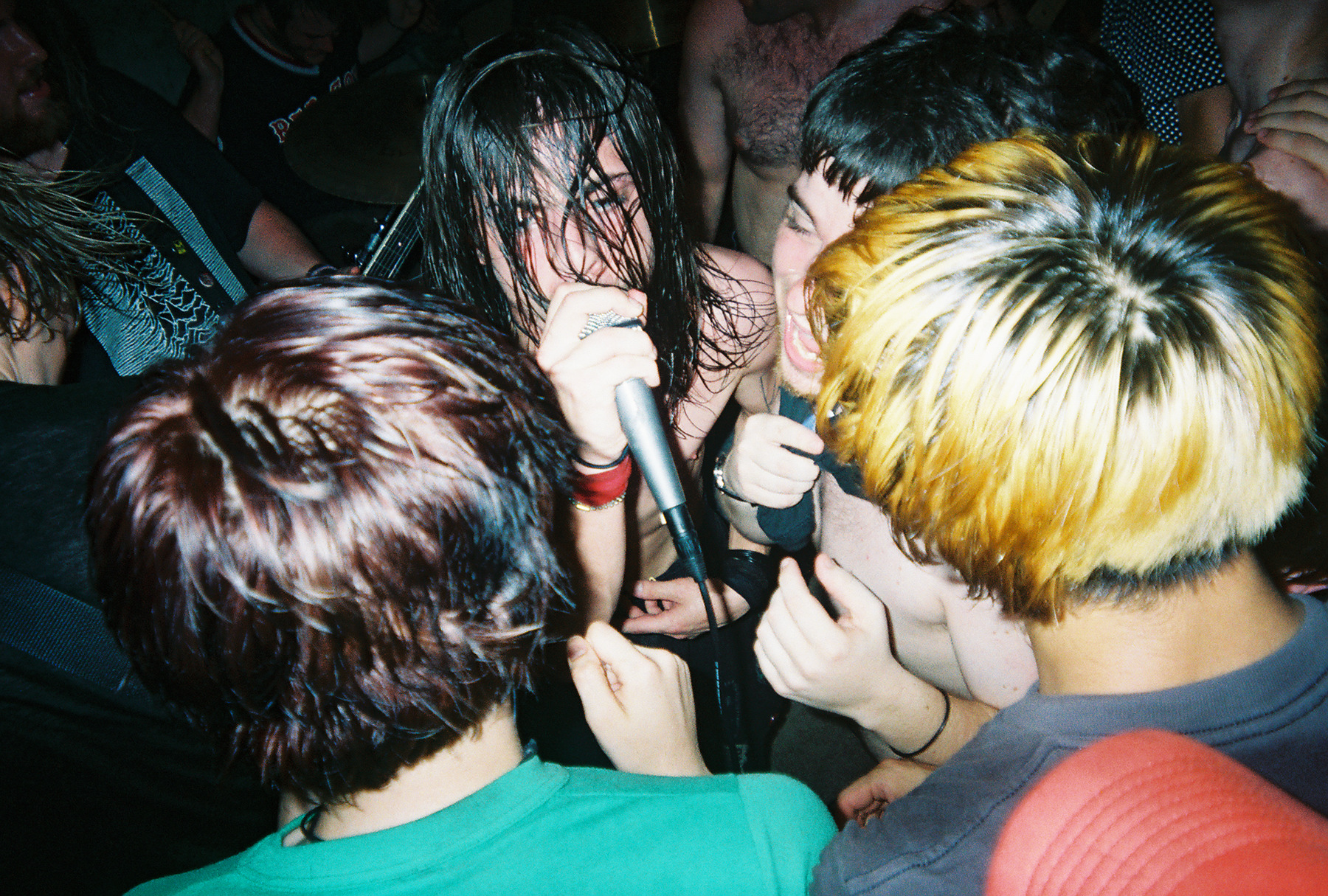
- Chris Taylor performing with Pg. 99 in Reading, Pennsylvania, in 2002

Background information
- Also known as: pageninetynine
- Origin: Sterling, Virginia, United States
- Genres: Screamo; hardcore punk; emoviolence
- Years active: 1997–2003, 2011, 2017-present
- Labels: Robotic Empire; Reptilian; Magic Bullet
- Spinoffs: Pygmylush; Malady; Terminal Bliss; Enemy Soil; Mannequin; Verse En Coma; Haram
- Spinoff of: Nitpick
- Members: Chris Taylor; Blake Midgette; Mike Taylor; Johnny Ward; George Crum; Jonathan Moore; Cory Stevenson; Brandon Evans
- Past members: T.L. Smoot; Mike Casto; Jeff Kane; Jonathan Wildman; Kevin Longendyke
- Website: pageninetynine.bandcamp.com

Pg. 99 (also spelled pageninetynine) is a hardcore punk band from Sterling, Virginia, a town on the outskirts of Washington, D.C., who are widely considered one of the pioneers of the screamo genre. The band formed as a six-piece in late 1997 and broke up as an eight-piece in 2003; at their maximum capacity they performed with two singers, three guitarists, two bassists and a drummer and were known for their intense live shows.

== History ==
=== 1997–2002: Existence ===
Pg. 99's origins trace back to the punk band Nitpick. Formed by brothers Chris and Mike Taylor in the mid-1990s, the band also included brothers Jeff and Eric Kane, who'd go on to be in other Virginian punk bands City of Caterpillar (Jeff) and Strike Anywhere (Eric). Towards of the end of Nitpick's life, Blake Midgette, a friend of Chris and Mike's whom they made a song about, joined as the band's second vocalist.

After Nitpick ended, Midgette and drummer Johnny Ward jammed together on Christmas Eve 1997. The jam would lead to Midgette reaching out to the Taylor brothers to join him and Ward, with George Crum and T.L. Smoot being recruited to create the first lineup of Pg. 99 days later. They played their first show on February 28, 1998.

In early 1999, Mike and Reactor No. 7 bassist Andy Low founded Robodog Records (now Robotic Empire). The label's first two releases were the Document #3 split 7-inch between Pg. 99 and Reactor No. 7 and the Document #4 tour 6" record that Pg. 99 sold during their first tour in the summer of 1999.

Pg. 99 toured frequently, performing over 300 shows during its five-year existence. The band underwent a total of nine tours, and have played shows in both the United States and Europe. The band also released three full-length albums, seven splits, an extended play, two compilations, and a demo tape across its lifespan.

=== 2003–2010: Hiatus ===
After several US tours, a European tour, and numerous releases, they disbanded in May 2003. Before officially breaking up, Pg.99 booked Steve Albini of Shellac and Big Black as their producer for a follow-up to Document #8. Guitarist Mike Taylor cited struggles with maintaining a large line-up due to schedule conflicts, and issues with drinking as major reasons for why Pg. 99 broke up. Taylor also said, "It was like a dysfunctional family where a group of people needed to give each other some space and clarity." Four of the members would go on to perform in Pygmy Lush.

Two releases completed before the group's break up have yet to see light: a DVD compiling various live footage, and a split 10-inch with City of Caterpillar containing both bands' last songs recorded.

=== 2011–present: Reunion shows ===
Pg. 99 performed a one-off reunion performance in August 2011. The group performed Document #8 in its entirety at the Best Friend's Day festival in Richmond, Virginia. When asked about the future of the band, Mike Taylor "We felt that if [Best Friend's Day] went well—how we play, how we sound, how we felt—we'd be up for more. If we're going to do it, it's gotta be right and has to feel good. Community is one of the things that made Pg. 99 gigs so special." After the Best Friend's Day festival sold out, Pg.99 scheduled a second performance on August 27, 2011, at The Black Cat in Washington, DC.

In a group interview with NPR, Pg.99 was asked about the possibility of recording new material, and several of the members gave conflicting responses. Chris Taylor was content writing and releasing new music with Pygmy Lush, and said, "The only reason to realistically do that is being an old fogey and not making any money and being like, 'This could make us some money.'" However, Mike said he would be interested in "learning some more songs and doing something small."

In 2017, it was announced that the group will reunite again and will tour with Majority Rule in September 2017. Mike Taylor has mentioned plans to release a "long hidden" Document #15 through his Yr Screaming Youth imprint sometime in the future.

On August 6, 2023, pageninetynine performed at New Friends Fest as the closing act of the three day music festival in Toronto, Ontario.

In spring of 2025, the band embarked on a European tour with 17 live shows announced.

== Style and influences ==
Pg. 99 is commonly considered a screamo band, although the band has expressed some distaste of the label and prefers to be seen as simply punk rock instead. They are also seen as an emoviolence band, sometimes verging on grindcore. The band has also been commonly labeled as hardcore punk. Earlier releases showed the band playing a more straightforward style heavily influenced by hardcore punk and grindcore, while later releases showed the band experimenting with progression and atmosphere, such as Document #7.

All of the band's releases were known as "documents", according to the guitarist Mike Taylor, this was done because each release by the band was seen as a document of their state at the time of recording. The band has gone on to name many groups as influences, such as Born Against, Rorschach, Deadguy, Unwound, Jeromes Dream, Leonard Cohen (who is referenced by the band with their song "The Lonesome Waltz of Leonard Cohen"), Orchid, and Sunny Day Real Estate. Artwork for their music was primarily done by vocalist Chris Taylor. Members of the band have been largely involved with the local Virginia scene, with members being in bands such as City of Caterpillar, Enemy Soil, Pygmy Lush, among others.

== Members ==
Current members

- Chris Taylor – vocals (1997–2003, 2011, 2017–present)
- Blake "Tiny Dancer" Midgette – vocals (1997–2003, 2011, 2017–present)
- Mike Taylor – guitar (1997–2003, 2011, 2017–present)
- George Crum – guitar (1997–2001, 2002–2003, 2011, 2017–present)
- Jonathan Moore – guitar (2002–2003, 2011, 2017–present)
- Cory Stevenson – bass (2000–2002, 2017–present)
- Brandon Evans – bass (2000–2003, 2011, 2017–present)
- Johnny Ward – drums (1997–2003, 2011, 2017–present)

Former members

- T.L. Smoot – bass (1997–2000)
- Mike Casto – guitar (1999–2001)
- Jeff Kane – programming, noise (1999)
- Jonathon Wildman – bass (2001)
- Kevin Longendyke – bass (2002–2003)

Timeline

== Discography ==
- Document #1 - Demo tape (self-released, 1999)
- Document #2 - Split 7-inch with Enemy Soil (Sacapuntas Records, 1999)
- Document #3 - Split 7-inch with Reactor No. 7 (Robodog Records, 1999)
- Document #4 - Tour 6" (Robodog Records, 1999)
- Document #5 - First full-length LP/CD (Reptilian Records, 2000)
- Document #6 - Split 7-inch with Process is Dead (Witching Hour Records, 2000)
- Document #7 - LP/CD (Magic Bullet Records/Happy Couples Never Last, 2001)
- Document #8 - LP/CD/Tape (Robotic Empire/Electric Human Project/Scene Police/Old Skool Kids/SzSS, 2001)
- Document #9: A Split Personality - Split 7-inch with City of Caterpillar (Level Plane Records, 2001)
- Document #10: Do You Need A Play To Stay? - Split Live LP/CD with Waifle (Magic Bullet Records, 2001)
- Document #11 - 7-inch Reissue of Documents #3 and #4 (Robotic Empire, 2002)
- Document #12 - Split LP/CD with Majority Rule (Magic Bullet Records, 2002)
- Document #13: Pyramids in Cloth - Split 7-inch with Circle Takes the Square (Perpetual Motion Machine Records, 2002)
- Document #14: Singles - CD containing all vinyl/compilation/demo tracks (Reptilian Records, 2003) and reissued on vinyl in 2011 through Robotic Empire
