= Isis discography =

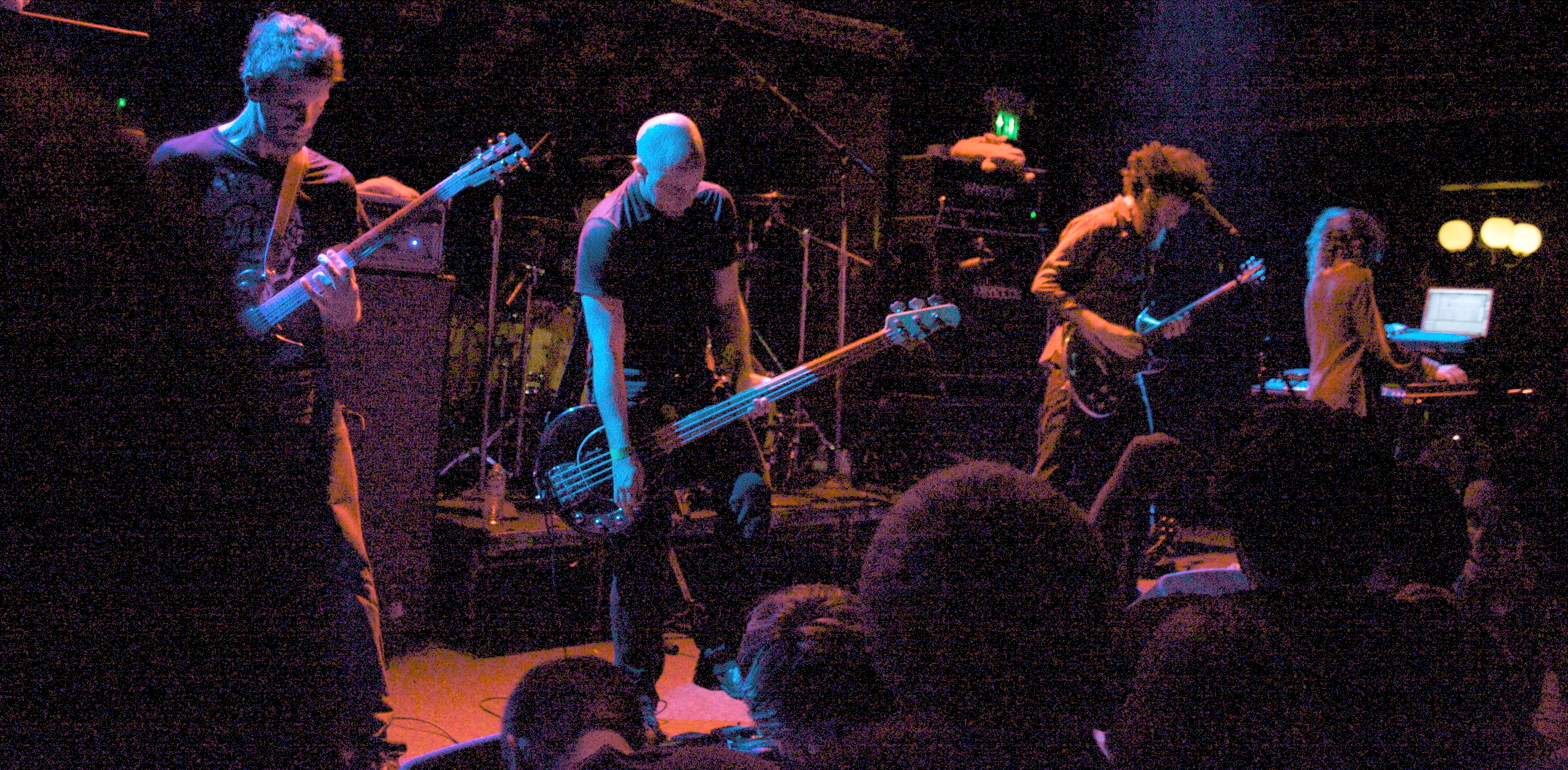
- Isis performing live at the Great American Music Hall in San Francisco, CA. Visible from left to right are: Michael Gallagher, Jeff Caxide, Aaron Turner, Bryant Clifford Meyer. Visible in the back is drummer Aaron Harris.
- Studio albums: 5
- Extended plays: 5
- Live albums: 7
- Compilation albums: 2
- Singles: 2
- Video albums: 1
- Music videos: 5
- Splits: 2
- Other appearances: 1

Isis was an American post-metal band active from 1997 to 2010. They released five full-length albums, five extended plays (EPs), seven live albums, two singles, and have collaborated with artists on numerous other projects.

Isis was formed in Boston, Massachusetts in late 1997 by Aaron Turner (guitar/vocals; also the owner of Hydra Head Records), Jeff Caxide (bass guitar), Chris Mereschuk (electronics/vocals) and Aaron Harris (drums). In 1998, they recorded a demo and their first EP, Mosquito Control, with this lineup. The band replaced Mereschuk with Jay Randall and added former Cast Iron Hike guitarist Michael Gallagher before releasing the 1999 EP The Red Sea. Bryant Clifford Meyer of The Gersch replaced Jay Randall in the spring of 1999, and Isis remained with this lineup until their dissolution. Isis' debut full-length, Celestial, and its sister EP, SGNL>05, were released in 2000 and 2001, respectively.

In 2002, Oceanic was released to critical acclaim, and was the subject of a series of four vinyl reinterpretations by various contemporary artists; the series was consolidated into an Ipecac Recordings release, entitled Oceanic: Remixes & Reinterpretations. Growth in stature necessitated relocation to Los Angeles in 2003. Panopticon was released in 2004, to further critical plaudits and an album of the year award from Rock Sound. It was also the band's first entry into the charts, peaking at number 47 in the Billboard Top Independent Albums chart.

Their next record, In the Absence of Truth, was released by Ipecac on October 31, 2006. This full-length charted more successfully, peaking at number six in Billboard's Top Heatseekers chart; however, critical reception was not particularly warm and the band themselves have expressed disappointment with the album. "Holy Tears" and "Not in Rivers, but in Drops" were released from the album as singles in 2008, along with a limited-edition vinyl compilation box set entitled Shades of the Swarm later in the year. Their final full-length, Wavering Radiant, was released in 2009 and marked the band's first entry in the Billboard 200, peaking at 98; it also saw international commercial exposure, seeing entry into the charts of the United Kingdom, Germany and Norway. Isis split up in June 2010, just before the release of a split EP with Melvins. Their entire back-catalogue of live releases saw digital re-release in mid-2011, and a compilation of demos and alternative versions of songs, called Temporal, was released on November 6, 2012 by Ipecac Recordings.

== Albums ==
=== Studio albums ===
List of studio albums, with selected chart positions and certifications
Title	Album details	Peak chart positions								
Title	Album details	US Indie	US Heat	US Rock	US Taste	US	UK	UK Rock	GER	NOR
Celestial	Released: April 3, 2000; Label: Escape Artist (EA07.0); Formats: CD, 2×LP	—	—	—	—	—	—	—	—	—
Oceanic	Released: September 16, 2002; Label: Ipecac (IPC-032); Formats: CD, 2×LP	—	—	—	—	—	—	—	—	—
Panopticon	Released: October 19, 2004; Label: Ipecac (IPC-057); Formats: CD, 2×LP	47	—	—	—	—	—	—	—	—
In the Absence of Truth	Released: October 31, 2006; Label: Ipecac (IPC-081); Formats: CD, 2×LP	20	6	—	12	—	184	—	—	—
Wavering Radiant	Released: April 21, 2009; Label: Ipecac (IPC-113); Formats: CD, 2×LP	10	—	14	7	98	190	17	96	37
"—" denotes a recording that did not chart or was not released in that territory.

=== Live albums ===
Title	Release details	Recorded
Live I	Released: March 2004; Label: Electric Human Project (EHP 0.31); Formats: CD, LP	September 23, 2003; The Fillmore, San Francisco, California, United States
Live II	Released: November 2004; Label: Troubleman Unlimited (TMU 152); Formats: CD, 2×LP	March 19, 2003; Stockholm, Sweden
Live III	Released: April 2005; Label: Profound Lore (PLR 018); Formats: CD, 2×LP	December 7, 2004; The Launchpad, Albuquerque, New Mexico, United States
Live IV	Released: May 2006; Label: Robotic Empire (Robo 079); Formats: CD, 2×LP	2001–2005; Various sources
Live V	Released: October 2009; Label: Viva Hate (VHR018); Formats: CD, 2×LP	July 23, 2006; KOKO, London, England
Live VI	Released: February 14, 2012; Label: Self-released; Format: 2×LP	November 16, 2007; Hawthorne Theatre, Portland, Oregon, United States
Live VII	Released: March 31, 2017; Label: Ipecac (IPC-181); Formats: 2×LP, CD	February 25, 2010; Corner Hotel, Melbourne, Australia

== Extended plays ==
=== Solo ===
Title	Release details	Notes
Demo 98	Released: June 1998; Label: Hydra Head (HH666-27.5); Format: Cassette	Demo recording. 545 cassettes were made. The songs were later included as bonus tracks on the CD and 12" versions of The Red Sea.
The Mosquito Control EP	Released: October 1998; Label: Escape Artist (EA03.0); Formats: CD, LP	First official release.
The Red Sea	Released: July 1999; Label: Second Nature (SN014); Formats: CD, 8", LP	The CD and 12" versions of this release include all material from the 1998 demo.
Sawblade	Released: November 1999; Label: Hydra Head (HH666-41.5); Formats: CD-R, LP	Tour-only limited edition release; 200 handmade CD-Rs and 250 copies of the vinyl edition were pressed. 600 vinyl editions were later pressed as part of the Shades of the Swarm box set.
SGNL›05	Released: March 6, 2001; Label: Neurot (NR012); Formats: CD, LP	This release has been described by Aaron Turner as an "extension" of Celestial.

=== Collaborative ===
Title	Release details	Notes
In the Fishtank 14 (with Aereogramme)	Released: September 25, 2006; Label: Konkurrent (Fish 14); Formats: CD, LP	Part of the "In the Fishtank" series, this release is a collaboration with Scottish band Aereogramme.

=== Splits ===
Title	Release details	Notes
Isis / Pig Destroyer	Released: July 2000; Label: Relapse (RR-040); Format: 7" vinyl	Isis contributed a cover version of the title track from Godfleshes Streetcleaner which was previously released on the Sawblade EP.
Melvins / Isis	Released: July 13, 2010; Label: Hydra Head (HH666-214); Format: LP	Isis contributed two songs that were recorded during the Wavering Radiant sessions.

=== Remixes ===
Title	Release details	Notes
Oceanic Remixes Volume I	Released: April 11, 2004; Label: Robotic Empire (Robo 037); Format: LP	Consists of remixes of tracks from Oceanic, contributed to by a variety of artists. Later compiled and released as a 2×CD (and later 2×LP) titled Oceanic Remixes/Reinterpretations. Also released as a 4×LP box set comprising all four volumes.
Oceanic Remixes Volume II	Released: July 13, 2004; Label: Robotic Empire (Robo 038); Format: LP	Consists of remixes of tracks from Oceanic, contributed to by a variety of artists. Later compiled and released as a 2×CD (and later 2×LP) titled Oceanic Remixes/Reinterpretations. Also released as a 4×LP box set comprising all four volumes.
Oceanic Remixes Volume III	Released: August 24, 2004; Label: Robotic Empire (Robo 039); Format: LP	Consists of remixes of tracks from Oceanic, contributed to by a variety of artists. Later compiled and released as a 2×CD (and later 2×LP) titled Oceanic Remixes/Reinterpretations. Also released as a 4×LP box set comprising all four volumes.
Oceanic Remixes Volume IV	Released: November 23, 2004; Label: Robotic Empire (Robo 040); Format: LP	Consists of remixes of tracks from Oceanic, contributed to by a variety of artists. Later compiled and released as a 2×CD (and later 2×LP) titled Oceanic Remixes/Reinterpretations. Also released as a 4×LP box set comprising all four volumes.

== Compilations / box sets ==
Title	Release details	Type	Notes
Oceanic Remixes/Reinterpretations	Released: 2004; Labels: Hydra Head (HH666-83) and Robotic Empire (Robo 037–040); Formats: 2×CD, 2×LP, 4×LP	Remix album, Compilation, Box set	Consists of remixes of tracks from Oceanic, contributed to by a variety of artists. Originally released as a series of four 12" LPs on Robotic Empire.
Shades of the Swarm	Released: February 22, 2008; Labels: Robotic Empire (Robo 074) and Conspiracy (CORE058); Format: 12×LP	Box set	LP box set of all of Isis' full-length albums and EPs up to and including In the Absence of Truth, produced in commemoration of the band's 10-year anniversary. Limited to 600.
Live I-VI	Released: March 21, 2012; Label: Daymare (DYMC-150); Format: 6×CD	Live album, Box set	CD box set consisting of Live I, Live II, Live III, Live IV, Live V, and Live VI. Limited to 300.
Temporal	Released: November 6, 2012; Label: Ipecac (IPC-140); Formats: 2×CD, 3×LP + DVD	Compilation	Contains demos, remixes, covers, an acoustic track, and a DVD featuring all official music videos.

== Singles ==
Title	Release details	Album
"Holy Tears"	Released: February 5, 2008; Label: Ipecac (IPC-095); Formats: CD, LP	In the Absence of Truth (2006)
"Not in Rivers, But in Drops"	Released: October 14, 2008; Label: Ipecac (IPC-099); Format: CD	In the Absence of Truth (2006)

== Videography ==
=== Music videos ===
Title	Director	Album
"In Fiction"	Josh Graham	Panopticon (2004)
"Holy Tears"	Dominic Hailstone	In the Absence of Truth (2006)
"Not in Rivers, But in Drops"	Sera Timms	In the Absence of Truth (2006)
"20 Minutes / 40 Years"	Matt Santoro	Wavering Radiant (2009)
"Pliable Foe"	Kenneth Thomas	Melvins / Isis (2010)

=== DVD ===
Title	Release details	Notes
Clearing the Eye	Released: September 26, 2006; Label: Ipecac (IPC-080); Format: DVD	Features live videos (including an entire live performance), the "In Fiction" music video, photo galleries, a complete discography, lyrics for all songs featured, and a 20-page booklet.

== Other appearances ==
Song	Year	Compilation	Label	Notes
"Boris" (Melvins cover)	2005	We Reach: The Music of the Melvins	Fractured Transmitter (FTRC004)	Made in collaboration with Agoraphobic Nosebleed.

== See also ==
- Hydra Head Records discography
- Ipecac Recordings discography
