= Shades of the Swarm =

Box set by Isis
- Released: February 22, 2008
- Recorded: 1998–2006
- Genre: Avant-garde metal Experimental rock Post-metal; Psychedelic rock Atmospheric sludge
- Label: Robotic Empire (12 x LP) (Robotic074_BOXSET); Conspiracy (12 x LP) (CORE045)
- Producer: Isis, Matt Bayles, Kurt Ballou

Shades of the Swarm is a 12 x 12" vinyl box set released by Isis to commemorate their 10th anniversary, and was strictly limited to 600 copies. The box set was jointly released by Robotic Empire and Conspiracy Records who each produced 300 copies. The box set comprises the entire discography of the band, with the exception of live albums and split releases, in newly redesigned sleeves based on artwork from the original sources and on heavyweight 180gm black vinyl. The cloth-bound box is embossed with a gold illustration by Aaron Horkey, and the oversize 12" x 36" poster insert contains the lyrics for the entire discography.

From earliest to latest the records included are: Mosquito Control EP, The Red Sea EP, Sawblade EP, Celestial (2xLP), Sgnl>05 (EP), Oceanic (2xLP), Panopticon (2xLP) and In the Absence of Truth (2xLP).
