= Live.01 =

Live album by Isis
- Released: March 2004
- Recorded: September 23, 2003
- Genres: Post-metal, Sludge metal
- Length: 39:43
- Labels: Self-released (CD); Electric Human Project (vinyl) (EHP 0.31)

Isis chronology
Oceanic (2002)	Live.01 (2004)	Panopticon (2004)

Live.01 is Isis's first live release, recorded on September 23, 2003, at the Fillmore in San Francisco, California, USA. It is sourced from an audience bootleg recording and, as such, does not sound professionally recorded. The fan who made this performance did not properly record the first song ("From Sinking") and thus this release is not totally complete.

As with the rest of the live series, the CD version was self-released. The vinyl edition was handled, in this instance, by the Electric Human Project. It was re-released on May 31, 2011, in digital format almost a year after Isis' dissolution, as part of a cycle in which all of Isis' live albums were re-released.

== Track listing ==
All songs written by Isis.

1. "Carry" – 6:59
2. "Hym" – 9:31
3. "Weight" – 13:29
4. "The Beginning and the End" – 10:24

== Personnel ==
Band members

- Jeff Caxide – bass guitar
- Aaron Harris – drums
- Michael Gallagher – guitar
- Bryant Clifford Meyer – keyboards, guitar, vocals
- Aaron Turner – vocals, guitar, design

Guest musician

- Dominic Aitchison – additional guitar on "Weight"

Other personnel

- Brooke Gillespie – live audio recording
- Jason Hellman – website
- Greg Moss – live sound
- Nick Zampiello – mastering
