= Live V =

Live album by Isis
- Released: October 2009
- Recorded: July 23, 2006
- Genres: Post-metal, sludge Metal
- Length: 67:02
- Labels: Self-released; Viva Hate Records (vinyl) (VHR018)
- Producer: Justin Broadrick

Isis chronology
| Wavering Radiant (2009) | Live V (2009) | Melvins / Isis (2010) |

Live V is Isis's fifth live release. This live album is unique for Isis in that it is a soundboard recording taken from a single live performance. The show was performed on July 23, 2006, at Koko's in London for All Tomorrow's Parties' Don't Look Back series of concerts, where artists are invited to perform one of their albums in its entirety. Isis were asked to perform Oceanic.

As with the rest of the live series, the CD version was self-released, while the album was released on vinyl by Viva Hate Records. Along with all Isis' other live albums, it is set to be re-released on July 26, 2011 in digital format, almost a full year after Isis' dissolution. It marks the fifth and final of the series released to a fortnightly schedule.

== Track listing ==
All tracks are written by Isis.

| No. | Title | Length |
|---|---|---|
| 1. | "The Beginning And The End" | 9:25 |
| 2. | "The Other" | 8:09 |
| 3. | "False Light" | 7:41 |
| 4. | "Carry" | 5:24 |
| 5. | "-/Maritime" | 4:52 |
| 6. | "Weight" | 13:33 |
| 7. | "From Sinking" | 8:40 |
| 8. | "Hym" | 9:18 |

== Personnel ==
- Aaron Turner – vocals, guitar
- Jeff Caxide – bass guitar
- Michael Gallagher – guitar
- Aaron Harris – drums
- Bryant Clifford Meyer – keyboards and guitar
- Justin Broadrick – mixing, additional guitar on "Weight"
- Nick Zapiello – mastering
