= Live.04 =

Live album by Isis
- Released: May 2006
- Recorded: 2001–2005
- Venue: various locations
- Genres: Post-metal; sludge metal; experimental metal
- Length: 63:38
- Labels: Self-released (CD); Robotic Empire (vinyl) (Robo 079)
- Producer: Isis

Isis chronology
Live.03 (2005)	Live.04 (2006)	In the Absence of Truth (2006)

Live.04 is Isis's fourth live release and the first to be composed of recordings from several different sources and eras. Many of the tracks are from audience bootleg recordings, and as such do not sound professionally recorded. The exception is the first track, recorded for WMBR Radio Boston. As with the rest of the live series, the CD version was self-released. The vinyl edition was handled, in this instance, by Robotic Empire.

Along with Isis' other live albums, Live.04 was re-released on July 12, 2011 in digital format, a full year after Isis' dissolution. It marks the fourth of the series released to a fortnightly schedule.

== Track listing ==
All songs written by Isis unless otherwise noted.

No.	Title	Length
1.	"Gentle Time"	8:54
2.	"Glisten"	6:57
3.	"C.F.T. (New Circuitry and Continued Evolution)"	8:02
4.	"Celestial (The Tower)"	10:49
5.	"Improv 1 / Endless Nameless" (K. Cobain)	8:01
6.	"False Light"	8:30
7.	"Weight" (instrumental version)	12:25
Total length:		63:38

- Track 1 recorded at WMBR, Boston, MA – 2001
- Tracks 2 and 7 recorded at The Troubadour, Los Angeles. CA – May 11, 2005
- Tracks 3 and 4 recorded at CBGB's, New York, NY – August 26, 2001
- Track 5 recorded at The Rotunda, Philadelphia, PA – July 6, 2001
- Track 6 recorded at The Middle East Upstairs, Cambridge, MA – September 17, 2002

== Personnel ==
Isis

- Aaron Turner – vocals, guitar
- Jeff Caxide – bass guitar
- Bryant Clifford Meyer – electronics, guitar
- Michael Gallagher – guitar
- Aaron Harris – drums

Guest musicians

- Justin Chancellor – bass guitar on "Weight"
- Troy Ziegler – djembe on "Weight"

Technical personnel

- Nick Zampiello – mastering
