= Live.03 =

Live album by Isis
- Released: April 2005
- Recorded: December 17, 2004
- Genre: Post-metal, Sludge Metal, Post-rock
- Length: 67:40
- Label: Self-released (CD); Profound Lore Records (vinyl) (PLR 018)

Isis chronology
Oceanic Remixes (2004)	Live.03 (2005)	Live.04 (2006)

Recorded on December 17, 2004, at the Launchpad in Albuquerque, New Mexico, Live. 03 is Isis's third live release. It is sourced from an audience bootleg recording, and as such, does not have professional sound quality.

This is the first live release to feature songs from 2004's Panopticon LP.

As with the rest of the live series, the CD version was self-released. The vinyl edition was handled, in this instance, by Profound Lore Records. Along with all Isis' other live albums, it is set to be re-released on June 28, 2011 in digital format, almost a full year after Isis' dissolution. It marks the third of the series released to a fortnightly schedule.

== Track listing ==
All songs written by Isis.

1. "So Did We" – 8:43
2. "Backlit" – 8:40
3. "The Beginning and the End" – 9:24
4. "In Fiction" – 10:15
5. "Wills Dissolve" – 7:29
6. "Grinning Mouths" – 8:51
7. "Altered Course" – 15:38

== Personnel ==
- Karl Frinkle – Live audio recording
- Nick Zampiello – Mastering
- Michael Babcock – Printing at Interrobang
- Jeff Caxide – Bass guitar
- Aaron Harris – drums
- Michael Gallagher – Guitar
- Bryant Clifford Meyer – Electronics, guitar
- Aaron Turner – vocals, guitar, design
- Greg Moss – Live sound
