= Live.02 =

Live album by Isis
- Released: November 2004
- Recorded: March 19, 2003
- Genre: Post-metal, sludge metal, experimental metal
- Length: 65:19
- Label: Self-released (CD); Troubleman Unlimited Records (vinyl) (TMU 152)
- Producer: Isis, Helena "Nenne" Zetterberg

Isis chronology
Panopticon (2004)	Live.02 (2004)	Oceanic Remixes (2004)

Recorded on March 19, 2003, in Stockholm, Sweden, Live.02 is Isis's second live release. It is sourced from a Swedish radio recording, and, as such, is the best-sounding of Isis' live releases thus far. The original radio broadcast on P3 Live did not feature the song "Carry."

As with the rest of the live series, the CD version was self-released. A vinyl LP limited to 1000 copies was released on December 6, 2005 through Troubleman Unlimited. Of the vinyl, 100 were on white with a poster available through mailorder only, the remaining 900 were on black. Along with all Isis' other live albums, it is set to be re-released on June 14, 2011 in digital format almost a full year after Isis' dissolution.

== Track listing ==
All songs written by Isis.

1. "From Sinking" – 10:56
2. "Glisten" – 7:11
3. "Carry" – 7:30
4. "Weight" – 13:09
5. "The Beginning and the End" – 9:48
6. "Celestial (Ext./Alt. Version)" – 17:25

== Personnel ==
- Helena "Nenne" Zetterberg - Radio producing
- Nick Zampiello - Mastering
- Jeff Caxide - Bass guitar
- Aaron Harris - drums
- Michael Gallagher - Guitar
- Bryant Clifford Meyer - Electronics, guitar
- Aaron Turner - vocals, guitar, design
- Ayal Naor - Guitar on "Weight"
- Maria Christopher - Guitar, vocals on "Weight"
- Greg Moss - Live sound
