= Clearing the Eye =

- DVD cover
- Written by: Isis
- Produced by: Isis
- Distributed by: Ipecac Recordings
- Release date: September 26, 2006
- Running time: 148 minutes
- Country: United States
- Language: English

Clearing the Eye is the first DVD release by the Los Angeles post-metal band Isis. It features live videos (including an entire live performance), the "In Fiction" music video, photo galleries, lyrics for all songs featured, a complete discography, and a 20-page booklet.

The DVD was originally to include a full documentary of the band, but was removed just prior to its release. According to the DVD's documentarian Seldon Hunt, "[t]he ISIS documentary was shelved at the last minute due to deadlines with Ipecac and some sound quality issues where there was not enough time to resolve before the release came out." This recording, as of 2015, has gone missing.

== Track list ==
All songs written and performed by Isis.

=== The Troubadour in Los Angeles on November 5, 2005 ===
1. "Glisten" – 6:39
2. "Weight" – 12:53

=== CBGB in New York on August 26, 2001 ===
1. "Celestial" – 10:38
2. "Collapse and Crush" – 6:24

=== Club Quattro in Tokyo, Japan on February 5, 2005 ===
1. "Grinning Mouths" – 9:18

=== CBGB in New York on June 3, 2001 ===
1. "CFT" – 7:23
2. "Gentle Time" – 7:26

=== Annandale Hotel in Sydney, Australia on February 11, 2005 ===
1. "Intro" – 0:49
2. "So Did We" – 8:38
3. "Backlit" – 10:20
4. "The Beginning and the End" – 8:42
5. "In Fiction" – 10:32
6. "Wills Dissolve" – 7:32
7. "Grinning Mouths" – 9:49
8. "Altered Course" – 16:19
9. "From Sinking" – 9:02

=== Music video ===
1. "In Fiction" – 5:37

== Reception ==
Dave Kerr of The Skinny described it as a “no-frills package without any great technical jiggery pokery,” and that “as a visual spectacle (the bonus promo video for In Fiction notwithstanding) there's little of note going on but a band throwing down onstage. For all the great music on show, the package still smacks of their having been a mate with a camcorder on the tour bus.”

== Personnel ==
- Jeff Caxide – bass guitar
- Aaron Harris – drums
- Michael Gallagher – guitar
- Bryant Clifford Meyer – electronics, guitar
- Aaron Turner – vocals, guitar
- Justin Chancellor – additional sounds/bass guitar on "Weight"
- Troy Zeigler – additional percussion on "Weight"
- Greg Moss – live sound
- Jason Hellman – website design
