= Mustard Gas and Roses =

Mustard Gas and Roses may refer to:

- MGR (musical project), a solo ambient project of Isis guitarist, Michael Gallagher
- Mustard Gas and Roses (Jakko album), a 1994 album by Jakko Jakszyk
