= 27 (band) =

American rock band

- Origin: Cambridge, Massachusetts, USA
- Genres: Indie rock
- Years active: 1997–present
- Labels: Relapse, Undergroove, Hydra Head, Escape Artist Records, Daymare, Release Entertainment, Kimchee, Reproductive Records, Interstellar Records
- Members: Maria Christopher; Terri Christopher; Ayal Naor; Adam McGrath
- Past members: Thos Niles; Neil Coulon; Greg Moss; Jay Cannava
- Website: www.27.vg

27 is an American rock band from Cambridge, Massachusetts. The band was formed by Maria Christopher, formerly of Dirt Merchants, and Ayal Naor in 1997. 27 is commonly categorized as a rock or indie rock band, but the genres lo-fi and emo have occasionally been used to describe them.

27 has toured extensively throughout Europe, North America, and Japan. In the Czech Republic, the band opened for Robert Plant.

27 shares a relatively close relationship with the band Isis. Bryant Clifford Meyer, of Isis, co-wrote the 27 song "1001 Gods", Aaron Turner, of Isis, contributed guitars and vocals to the song "April," and Jeff Caxide, of Isis, contributed to the song "Try." Maria Christopher and Ayal Naor, of 27, contributed to the songs "Weight," "Carry," and "The Beginning and the End" which appeared on the Isis album Oceanic. Of these, the song "Weight" was featured on the television show Friday Night Lights in 2007. 27 also released an album on Hydra Head Records, which is owned by Aaron Turner of Isis.

As of 2014, Adam McGrath from Cave In has been playing live guitar in 27.

== Band members ==
- Maria Christopher – vocals, guitars
- Terri Christopher – drums
- Ayal Naor – baritone guitar, samplers, bass
- Adam McGrath -guitar

== Discography ==
=== Albums ===
- Songs from the Edge of the Wing (1999)
- Animal Life (2002)
- Holding on for Brighter Days (2005)
- Brittle Divinity (2010)
- A Billion Searchlights (2021)

=== 7" singles ===
- "Angel's Share" (2001)
- "Try/Night" (2003)
- "Let the Light In" (2004)
- "A Million Years" (2007)
- "Another Hand b/w October Knows" (2008)
- "Total Fucking Destruction / Gardenbox / 27" (2010) [split with the bands Total Fucking Destruction and Gardenbox]
- "twenty27seven" (2012)
- "Innocent Lovers" (2017)

=== EPs ===
- Let the Light In (2004)
- Split (2005) [with the band Bug]
- 27:00 (2005) [split with the band Twin Zero]

=== Compilations ===
- Louder Than Words: Singles, B-Sides & Rarities (2012)

== See also ==
- Isis
- Spore
