= Wavering Radiant =

Studio album by ISIS
- Released: April 21, 2009
- Recorded: November 2008 – January 2009
- Studios: Joe's House of Compression; Pasadena, California; Sound City Studios; Van Nuys, California
- Genres: Post-metal; sludge metal; progressive metal
- Length: 54:05
- Label: Ipecac
- Producer: Joe Barresi

ISIS chronology
In the Absence of Truth (2006)	Wavering Radiant (2009)	Melvins / Isis (2010)

Wavering Radiant is the fifth and final studio album by the American post-metal group Isis, released by Ipecac Recordings in 2009 and produced by Joe Barresi. The band split just over a year after its release. The album continues Isis' history of lengthy songwriting, yet presents a slight departure from the soft-loud dynamics and post-metal aesthetic which characterized previous releases.

Reviewers noted a continued increase in melody from previous releases, and many were quick to note an increased prominence of keyboardist Bryant Clifford Meyer's work, using a Hammond B3 organ. In keeping with Isis' retinue of concept albums, a thematic strand runs throughout, dealing with dreams and Jungian psychology. Critical appraisal was largely positive, with some critics deeming it Isis' finest album; it also appeared on a handful of best-of lists at the close of the year. Commercially, it was Isis' most successful release ever, breaching the Billboard 200 for the first time and gaining international chart presence. It was ranked in the year-end lists by a number of reputed publications. To promote the album, Isis embarked on a world tour and shot a music video for the sixth track "20 Minutes/40 Years."

== Writing and recording ==
From conception to final release in 2009, drummer Aaron Harris estimates that the creation and execution of Wavering Radiant took about two and a half years. During the writing of the record, all of Isis' members were residing permanently within Los Angeles; a situation in contrast to their previous album, 2006's In the Absence of Truth; band members were divided between New York and Los Angeles throughout that album's inception and creation. The entire band felt a degree of dissatisfaction with In the Absence of Truth, and Harris felt that the logistical change was beneficial to the writing process, allowing for more time: "rather than feeling like we had limited time to capture something, I felt like we could take our time with the songs, and come back the next day to work on things rather than in a few weeks". The resulting sound was described by guitarist Michael Gallagher as "more live [...] a little bit dirtier – almost, for lack of a better word, sloppy. But in a good way. We spent a lot of time getting all of our takes as close to perfect as we could on previous records. On this one, we went more with the vibe of the particular take in question."

During the composition phase, Harris multitrack recorded the rehearsals, allowing the band to listen to the material and re-examine it, allowing them greater room to jam while writing "without the worry of forgetting something or not fully understanding what [they were] doing". This, coupled with the lack of a deadline, meant that the process was more open-ended for the band, allowing more freedom to abandon failed avenues and giving ideas time to evolve. This attitude was extended to the manner in which the vocals were tracked – until Wavering Radiant, the vocals had normally been recorded last. Instead, more time was spent recording them; this allowed Aaron Turner, who had steadily grown in confidence as a vocalist, to relax and enjoy the process.

The recording process for the album began in November 2008 and lasted around three months, helmed by Joe Barresi. Isis' previous albums since Celestial had been produced by Matt Bayles, but for this record, it was decided that a change was needed. Although the professional parting of ways was peaceable, working with Bayles had become, in the words of Harris, "routine" and "old hat". Barresi was selected thanks to his work with bands such as Tool, Queens of the Stone Age and Melvins, and upon the album's completion, Harris felt that Barresi "brought out some aspects of the band that even we didn't fully understand." Harris' drums and keyboardist Bryant Clifford Meyer's Hammond B3 lines were tracked over three and a half days at Sound City in Van Nuys. This marked the first time a specialist drum tech was utilised by the band; Jerry Johnson, a veteran of projects with Def Leppard and Linkin Park, was recruited.

The involvement of Tool's Adam Jones as a guest musician was revealed at the same time as the album's official announcement. Jones contributes additional guitar on "Hall of the Dead" and keyboards on "Wavering Radiant", whereas Tool member Justin Chancellor had contributed to Isis' 2004 album, Panopticon, and Isis supported Tool during a 2006 tour.

Two additional tracks were recorded during the Wavering Radiant sessions, but failed to make it onto the final cut of the album. "The Pliable Foe" was selected for the Metal Swim compilation released by Adult Swim, as well as Isis' split with the Melvins, both released in 2010. "Way Through Woven Branches" saw release as an addition to the Japanese edition as a bonus track, as well as making its way onto the split with the Melvins.

== Theme ==
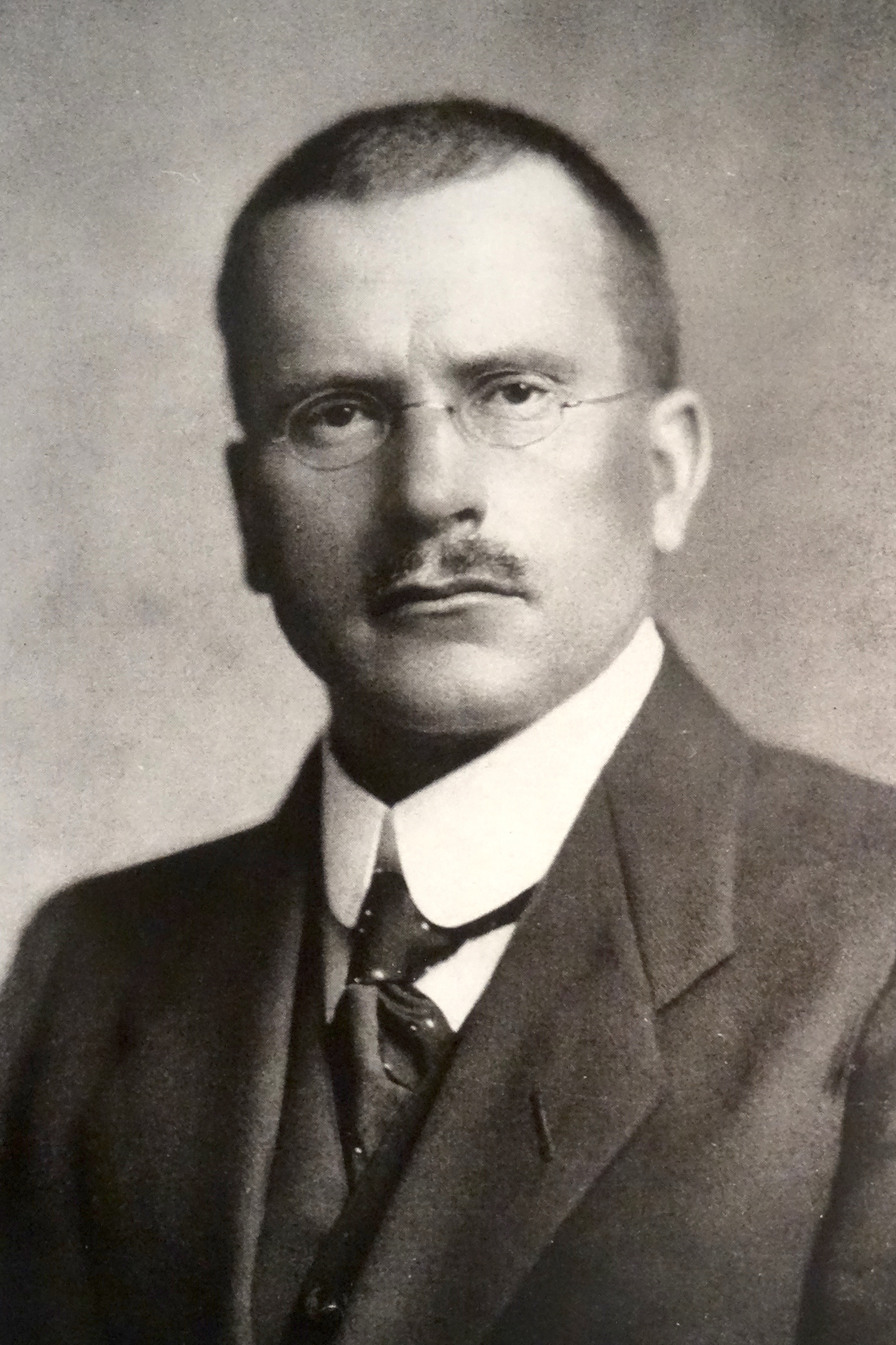
Carl Jung, whose works provided thematic influence for Aaron Turner's lyrics

Reviewers have discussed the presence of a theme, with Milton Savage deducing that "track titles would imply an underlying conceptual framework to Wavering Radiant, with 'Hall of the Dead' preceding 'Ghost Key', and 'Threshold of Transformation' closing the album in epic circumstances – Turner, it seems, has left our world behind for exploration of another beyond the lives led by mortal men." Isis releases have always had a thematic basis; as Andrew Rennie dissects, "Isis's four previous albums have clear story arcs, but Wavering Radiant's themes are open to interpretation, giving it added appeal." Over time, Turner has become reluctant to divulge the thematic particulars of any given album and on Wavering Radiant he has been equivocal. The act of explaining the thematic basis of an album erodes Turner's "connection" with the music, and he has spoken of how that relationship is something he "wishes to preserve". He also asserts that retaining this synergy with the music allows him to commit more to the album's live performances. Similarly, he has also spoken of how "[p]eople have a tendency to focus on one narrow aspect of the overall concept or misinterpret it."

The symbolism that comes up in dreams and the archetypal things that you discover in the process of self dream-analysis are things that have been recurrent throughout history in tons of different people from all walks of life and from all corners of the globe. So, in that way, it's not only an exploration of self, but an exploration of humanity.

— Aaron Turner, interviewed by J. Bennett

Although reluctant to give any specifics, he has expressed snippets of conceptual background at times; this, however, doesn't extend to the reasoning behind the album's title, which he declined to elaborate upon. When asked to describe the album in three words, he stated that it was a "path of exploration". Bassist Jeff Caxide has revealed that Turner noted Carl Jung as a major influence on the concept and lyrics. Jung's 1961 work, Memories, Dreams, Reflections, served as a specific source of inspiration for Turner, as he noted on his blog in a post preceding the album's release. Beyond Jung, he has spoken of how the album is closely related to dreams, and that he had been keeping a dream journal during the album's compositional phase. He gave up smoking marijuana in 2008, which he says enabled him to remember his dreams more clearly and, according to J. Bennett, "tap into an internal consciousness". All of the album's official lyrics, deemed almost entirely indecipherable, were revealed in celebration of the album's first anniversary.

== Music ==
Wavering Radiant, at 54 minutes, is Isis' shortest release since their 2000 studio début Celestial. The standard release contains seven tracks, ranging from less than two minutes to more than ten. It continues Isis' use of non-standard time signatures, opening in 5/4 time with "Hall of the Dead".

Milton Savage tussled with the challenge of defining Isis' sound: "If it's not heavy – 'dense' is better description – and the band's purer metal roots have grown into a towering trunk from which sprout the most tangled of branches, both sturdy and incredibly delicate, then how does one take in the full picture and condense twelve years of unfaltering advancement to a single adjective?" Roque Strew, of Pitchfork, struggles in the same vein: "pin a single label, style, adjective on Isis and it slips right off."

While reviewers were troubled with categorizing the band, much time was spent deliberating upon the album's sound when held in comparison with other Isis material. Robin Jahdi, writing for FACT Magazine, holds that the album presents a shift in dynamic. "It takes a while to realise, but [Wavering Radiant] is pretty different to what's come before from Aaron Turner and co. The last time this happened was 2002, when they transformed from brutal sludge metal to something altogether more delicate." Here, he references the transition brokered when Isis released Oceanic, a critically acclaimed departure from the sound of 2000's Celestial. Other differences from some of Isis' previous material have been noted; on a broad scale, the album was deemed "less punishing than Panopticon, from 2004, and less ponderous than In the Absence of Truth, from 2006", but closer examination also led Slant's Matthew Cole to suggest differences. "On past releases, Isis employed loud/soft dynamics to stunning effect, and while that element remains central to their sound, the best parts of Wavering Radiant suggest a more sophisticated integration. Rather than playing on the line between pretty and heavy, tracks like 'Stone to Wake a Serpent' and '20 Minutes / 40 Years' dissolve it." Not all reviews held the album to be such a departure – for instance, Andrew Hartwig feels that "Wavering Radiant continues in the direction that Isis have been travelling since their inception, with an increasing prominence of melody and a greater focus on placid sections to balance out their signature crushing heaviness".

Although Turner's lyrics are found to be "far from wholly discernable", his vocals have "mellowed". Robin Jahdi writes that "Turner's vocals are growing as well, sounding eerily like Steve Brodsky, from Isis' peers Cave In. These journeys into melody are so successful (vocal harmonies, no less) that you wonder why Turner still bothers with the pseudo-death metal vocals at all. They add little to the music and must serve to turn off more potential fans than they attract." Nate Chinen, however, sees this variety as a vital component of the album's success, attesting that "Aaron Turner expertly alternates between a death-metal roar and a more human wail, using whichever better suits the needs of a song".

"20 Minutes / 40 Years"
This sample contains the climax from "20 Minutes / 40 Years", demonstrating the layers of sound and the tone of the album. The track was described as "[dissolving] the line between pretty and heavy".

According to William Ruhlmann, "a big difference is provided by keyboardist Clifford Meyer, who provides texture, filling up the overall sound and also adding ethereal touches that sometimes make Isis reminiscent of Pink Floyd." This view is shared by Roque Strew, who argues that "equally vital to the record's dense, hypnotic shape is Clifford Meyer's command of the keyboard [...] His blissful, knotty phrases, played on a dusty Hammond B3 or Rhodes, often recreate moments from the psychedelic and prog-rock past." However, Chris Norton of Tiny Mix Tapes contends that "the prominent keyboard tones sound pretty hokey on this album." Praise was spared for drummer Aaron Harris also; on this release, "everyone is playing off Harris and following his lead dynamically. His sense of moment is perfect; knowing exactly when and where to jump in or cut back, and just how much."

The influence of several contemporary bands was deemed apparent upon the sound of the album. Robin Jahdi writes that "the Isis sound, debuted proper on the 2002 album, is still present and correct, but there's more subtle shifts in mood here, including when they take influence from outside (Tool's Adam Jones plays on two songs). The basslines bounce and jolt with that familiar elasticity, but the seismic six-string shifts on songs like 'Hand of the Host' and '20 Minutes / 40 Years' are the sort not heard from this band in years. It is no coincidence that these are highlights." The rhythms of "20 Minutes / 40 Years" are described as "Pelican-like" by NME reviewer Ben Patashnik, and No Ripcord's Sean Caldwell compares the album to Mastodon's Blood Mountain, citing its potential for "crossover" appeal.

== Promotion and release ==
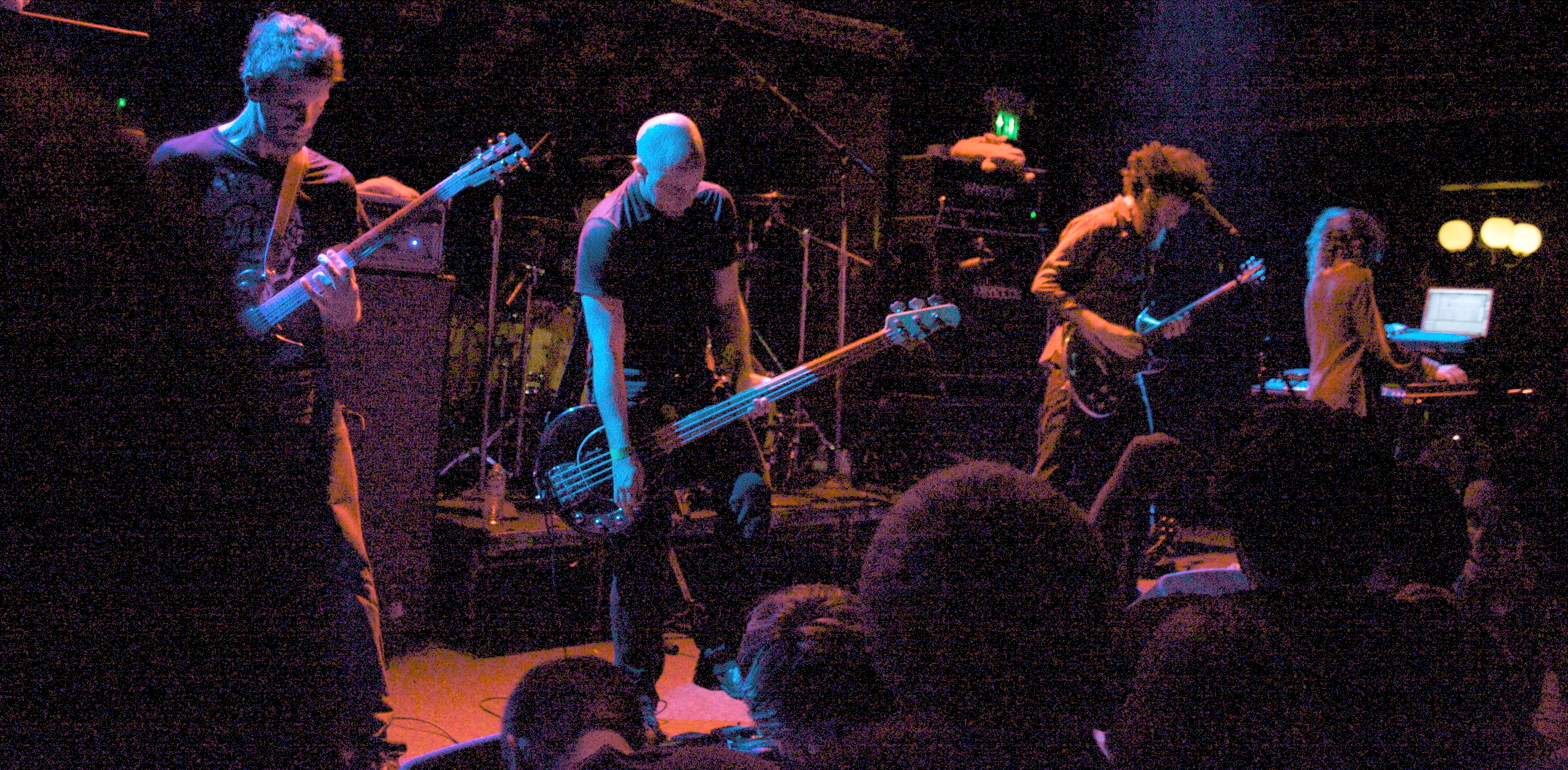
Isis performing live in support of Wavering Radiant, San Francisco, June 2009

In late December 2008, Isis began to introduce a previously unheard track into their live setlists, prompting speculation from fans and critics as video versions circulated on the Internet. Turner went on to announce the track's title as "20 Minutes / 40 Years" on December 30. The album was officially announced on January 22, 2009, and its title a week later. The album artwork and track list were published shortly afterwards, in early February. On March 24, Isis added the song "20 Minutes / 40 Years" to their MySpace page, and a week before the album's release, made the entire record available for streaming. To promote the album in the build-up to its release, Isis released a series of teaser videos, consisting of footage of the band recording, but no musical content. A limited edition run of signed CD booklets were made available to those pre-ordering the album, as well as album-related merchandise.

The album was released by Ipecac Recordings on limited vinyl on April 21, 2009, and in CD format on 5 May. European distribution was undertaken by Conspiracy Records, while a special Japanese edition was handled by Daymare Recordings.

External audio
- Isis live
- Isis performed at Bonnaroo 2010, showcasing many tracks from Wavering Radiant within their setlist. Audio courtesy of NPR.

Following the album's release, Isis embarked on a tour of North America, supported by Pelican and Tombs. They then went on to tour the UK and Europe through late 2009, supported variously by bands including Keelhaul, Dälek and Circle. They toured Australia, New Zealand and Japan with Baroness before returning to the United States to tour with Melvins, Jakob and Cave In from May to June. This American leg of the tour included an appearance at 2010's Bonnaroo festival in Manchester, Tennessee, while the Pacific portion took in the Soundwave Festival in Australia.

Having shot videos for tracks from their previous two albums, Isis went on to record another for "20 Minutes / 40 Years". Described as a "seven and a half minute epic", the video, directed by Matthew Charles Santoro and released in November 2009, opens with ferromagnetic fluid moving through an ambiguous, dark setting. A masked figure, trapped inside a translucent box, watches its interplay. The fluid enters the box, where it is subsumed by the figure. As the song reaches its crescendo, the box rises through the earth and breaks out of the surface into the sunlight, and its captive is freed. It received airplay on MTV2's Headbangers Ball.

== Reception ==
Professional ratings
Aggregate scores
Source	Rating
Metacritic	79/100
Review scores
Source	Rating
AllMusic	4/5 stars
Drowned in Sound	8/10
The Guardian	4/5 stars
NME	3/5 stars
Now	5/5 stars
Pitchfork	8.5/10
PopMatters	8/10
The Skinny	4/5 stars
Slant Magazine	4.5/5 stars
Spin	4/5 stars

=== Critical reception ===
Critical response to the album was, overall, fairly laudatory. Its score of 79 out of 100 – or 'generally favorable' – on Metacritic attests to decent reception. Regarding its place in Isis' catalog, it has been described as their "most accomplished and complete album to date" by Ali Maloney of The Skinny, as their "smartest and richest record" and as "the toughest and catchiest Isis record" since their debut album, Celestial." Beyond the band's own repertoire, it was described as "metal played at its arresting best", and Andrew Rennie of Now went as far as declaring it "close to perfect". Not all reviews were so glowing, as the NME characterized it as "45 minutes of awesomeness stretched out to a slightly bloated hour [...] the unsettling Toolisms of 'Ghost Key' meander just too long and 'Hand of the Host' spends half of its 11 minutes repeating itself without really juddering into the granite riff golem it threatens to be." Similarly, Chris Norton of Tiny Mix Tapes feels that the album "isn't the band's best by a really long shot, even if it ain't bad." Accessibility was a similarly divisive issue, with the album being characterized as "perhaps their most rewarding yet, but simultaneously their hardest to immediately access given its prioritising of subtle nuances over senses-numbing assaults" and "a slow-burning success". Conversely, it has also been declared to be "easily the band's most accessible effort". AllMusic's William Ruhlmann felt that with regards to structure, "Wavering Radiant works as a single piece of music rather than a series of songs", as Milton Savage of Drowned in Sound concurred that Isis have "construct[ed] their latest so that it's best experienced as a whole".

The success of the album was deemed contingent upon balance. The Guardian's Jamie Thomson posits that "the Isis of old gave the impression they were enjoying their meandering jams just a little too much, leaving the listener a tad lost. Here, they rein them in perfectly, and reward you with a colossal chorus for staying the distance", while Nate Chinen, of The New York Times, feels that the release "upholds a deliberative truce between brute physicality and moody rumination".

Critical selection of album highlights has provided multiple standout tracks: Milton Savage unequivocally declares that "'Stone to Wake a Serpent' is an obvious selection: its ominous, horror-movie keyboard tones duel with Turner's most ferocious performance in some years", a pick Andrew Rennie of NOW shared. Other selections include "20 Minutes / 40 Years" and "Hall of the Dead", which Roque Strew argues "may be the lushest, most astutely crafted opener in the Isis discography".

Turner himself had this to say of the album, fully cognizant that it would be the band's last: "I don't know if looking back many years from now if Wavering Radiant will be my favorite Isis record or not, but I certainly feel like it's the best record we were capable of making at the time, and I also feel like we didn't compromise in any really significant way the spirit or ideology behind the band in making it. And sonically speaking, I think it sounds really good, so that makes me happy, too."

=== Commercial reception ===
On 13 May the album entered the Billboard 200 at number 98 and the Top Independent Albums chart in tenth spot, representing the band's highest placing to date. In the United States, the album sold 5,800 copies in the first week of its release. It entered the BBC Radio 1 Top 40 Rock Albums chart at number 17, the Norwegian National Chart at number 37, and the German charts at number 96, providing Isis with their first chart exposure outside the United States and United Kingdom.

=== Accolades ===
Publication	Country	Accolade	Year	Rank
AllMusic	US	AllMusic's Favorite Metal Albums of 2009	2009	—
Decibel	US	Top 40 Albums of 2009	2009	10
Delusions of Adequacy	US	Best Albums of 2009	2009	21
PopMatters	US	The Best Metal Albums of 2009	2009	9
Rock Sound	UK	Top 75 Albums of 2009	2009	20

== Track listing ==
All tracks are written by Isis.

Wavering Radiant track listing
No.	Title	Length
1.	"Hall of the Dead"	7:39
2.	"Ghost Key"	8:29
3.	"Hand of the Host"	10:43
4.	"Wavering Radiant"	1:48
5.	"Stone to Wake a Serpent"	8:31
6.	"20 Minutes/40 Years"	7:05
7.	"Threshold of Transformation"	9:53
Total length:		54:05

Japanese edition bonus track
No.	Title	Length
8.	"Way Through Woven Branches"	6:25

== Personnel ==
Isis

- Jeff Caxide – bass guitar
- Aaron Harris – drums
- Michael Gallagher – guitar
- Bryant Clifford Meyer – electronics, guitar
- Aaron Turner – vocals, guitar, artwork

Guest

- Adam Jones – additional guitar on "Hall of the Dead" and keyboards on "Wavering Radiant"

Technical

- Joe Barresi – recording, mixing, production
- Adam Fuller – recording assistance
- Jun Murakawa – recording assistance
- Jerry Johnson – drum tech
- Brian Gardner – mastering
- Jonathan Gardner – live sound
- Greg Moss – live sound
- Faith Coloccia – photography, background coloring

== Chart positions ==
Chart	Peak position
Germany Album Chart	96
Norway Album Chart	37
UK Albums Chart	190
UK Rock Chart	17
US Billboard 200	98
US Billboard Independent Albums	10
US Billboard Hard Rock Albums	14
US Billboard Tastemaker Albums	7

== Release history ==
Date	Label	Region	Catalogue number	Format
April 21, 2009	Ipecac Recordings	United States	IPC-113LP	2×LP
May 5, 2009	Ipecac Recordings	United States	IPC-113	CD
May 5, 2009	Conspiracy Records	Europe	CORE078	CD/2×LP
May 5, 2009	Daymare Recordings	Japan	DYMV-090	CD/2×LP
