= The Red Sea (EP) =

EP by Isis
- Released: July 1999
- Recorded: February 1999 (The Red Sea); March–April 1998 (Demo)
- Genres: Sludge metal; post-metal
- Length: 15:08 (The Red Sea); 36:04 (The Red Sea + 1998 Demo)
- Labels: Second Nature Recordings (SN014)
- Producers: Isis, Kurt Ballou and Mike Hill

Isis chronology
The Mosquito Control EP (1998)	The Red Sea (1999)	Sawblade (1999)

The Red Sea is the second extended play by American post-metal band Isis. An expansion of the sound pioneered on their previous release Mosquito Control, this EP offers a slight evolution toward the direction Isis would begin to take with their debut album, Celestial. The three songs which make up the original EP (tracks 1–3) are tied together with spoken word samples from the short-lived television series Hotel Room (specifically, the third episode, entitled "Blackout"). The song "Ochre" contains a sample from the film Dead Man by Jim Jarmusch, and is a reading of a portion of William Blake's poem "Auguries of Innocence".

The album was first released on CD and 8" vinyl. The CD (and later 12") versions of The Red Sea contain the four songs that made up Isis' 1998 cassette demo (as bonus tracks); electronics are by former member Chris Mereschuk on those songs.

This is the first release with Jay Randall (Agoraphobic Nosebleed) on electronics and backing vocals (he also appeared on Isis' cover of "Streetcleaner", originally by Godflesh). Jay would leave the band after its release, and was replaced by Bryant Clifford Meyer, who stayed with Isis until their dissolution in 2010. The Red Sea was also the first release to feature Michael Gallagher, who would also stay with Isis until their end.

The Red Sea also introduces water as a key theme in Isis' albums that would be expanded upon later with (Oceanic).

"Charmicarmicarmicat" is a reference to the Melvins song "Charmicarmicat" (from the 1991 EP Eggnog), with an extra "carmi" added to poke fun at the general ridiculousness of the Melvins' sense of humor. This is seemingly confirmed in the liner notes, which thank "Earth, Bastard Noise and The Melvins for inspiration for track one."

== Reception ==
Professional ratings
Review scores
Source	Rating
Allmusic	3/5 stars

In reviewing the album, Allmusic's William York stated that The Red Sea “shows off a few different facets of the band's hardcore/doom/sludge/metal style, which at this stage was already pretty impressive despite not yet having fully developed to the point it would on subsequent efforts.” He continues to say that although it “feels a little bit more like them 'doing their homework' than a later album like Celestial does, it still outshines the work of many of their peers.”

Aaron Turner has expressed a degree of dissatisfaction with the final product, stating that Isis were “wrestling with a number of different ideas”, and that he personally “was trying to force a level of technicality in some of the guitar parts, especially in 'The Minus Times', which ended up detracting from the overall power of the songs.” He has, however, shown fondness for the title track, and posited that despite “whatever shortcomings this record has, it’s one of the darkest things we ever recorded in terms of atmosphere, production and composition.”

The first CD pressing of 2000 copies sold out in less than one month.

== Track listing ==
All tracks are written by Isis, except "Hand of Doom", a cover of a Black Sabbath track from 1970's Paranoid.

The Red Sea
No.	Title	Length
1.	"Charmicarmicarmicat Shines to Earth"	2:24
2.	"The Minus Times"	5:25
3.	"Red Sea"	7:17
Total length:		15:08

CD bonus tracks (1998 demo)
No.	Title	Length
4.	"Smiles and Handshakes"	6:02
5.	"Catalyst"	4:26
6.	"Ochre"	4:41
7.	"Lines Across Eyes"	5:47

Japanese edition bonus track
No.	Title	Length
8.	"Hand of Doom"	8:36

== Personnel ==
Band members

- Aaron Turner (vocals & guitar)
- Jeff Caxide (bass)
- Aaron Harris (drums)
- Michael Gallagher (guitar; tracks 1–3, 8)
- Jay Randall (electronics; tracks 1–3, 8)
- Chris Mereschuk (electronics; tracks 4–7)

Additional personnel

- G. Mortillaro – photography
- J. Hellmann – photography
- Kurt Ballou – audio recording and production (tracks 1–3, 8)
- Mike Hill – audio recording and production (tracks 4–7)
- Dave Merullo – mastering
