= In the Fishtank 14 =

EP by Isis and Aereogramme
- Released: September 25, 2006
- Recorded: July 2005
- Studios: E-Sound; Weesp, Netherlands
- Genre: Post-rock
- Length: 24:03
- Labels: In the Fishtank (Konkurrent), (Fish 14)
- Producer: Zlaya Hadzic

Isis chronology
Panopticon (2004)	In the Fishtank 14 (2006)	In the Absence of Truth (2006)

Aereogramme chronology
Seclusion (2004)	In the Fishtank 14 (2006)	My Heart Has a Wish That You Would Not Go (2007)

In the Fishtank chronology
In the Fishtank 13 (2005)	In the Fishtank 14 (2006)	In the Fishtank 15 (2009)

Professional ratings
Review scores
Source	Rating
AllMusic	3.5/5 stars
PopMatters	(7/10)

In the Fishtank 14 is a collaborative EP from Isis and Aereogramme. It is the fourteenth installment of the collaboration project by Konkurrent, and was released in September 2006. Rock Sound ranked it as the 39th best album of 2006 in its yearly rundown.

According to Isis frontman Aaron Turner, "Aereogramme is a band we've known for some time and have an affinity for their music and we got along with them, so when we were invited to do the session with them it was a no-brainer. [...] It went extremely smoothly and came together cohesively better than I could have ever imagined. [...] We both had some stuff pre-prepared, but usually we're hyper-prepared when we go into the studio, so it was fun for us to go in and just do it and let go a little bit and have other people to bounce ideas off of."

== Track listing ==
1. "Low Tide" – 9:29
2. "Delial" – 3:55
3. "Stolen" – 10:40

== Personnel ==
Isis

- Bryant Clifford Meyer
- Michael Gallagher
- Aaron Harris
- Aaron Turner
- Jeff Caxide

Aereogramme

- Craig B.
- Campbell McNeil
- Iain Cook
- Martin Scott

Other personnel

- David Klooker – engineering
- Zlaya Hadzic – production, mixing, mastering
- Grafx MFG – graphics manufacturing
