= Dominic Hailstone =

Film director, screenwriter and digital artist

- Born: Dominic Hailstone; Born 1973; London; United Kingdom
- Known for: Director of short films, music videos, screenwriting.

Dominic Hailstone (born London, 1973) is an English film director, screenwriter and digital artist, best known for achieving CGI like animation using practical effects as illustrated in his short film The Eel and music video for Isis "Holy Tears".

== Biography ==
=== Early work ===
After leaving school at age 17, Hailstone worked for the special fx industry on films like Interview with the Vampire, Harry Potter and Chris Cunningham’s Come to Daddy music video. During this early period he also co-directed a 17 min short film with Barney Clay called Deadenhead (1990).

=== Film work ===
Hailstone’s first solo film was Logboy Goes Walkies which won the Channel 4 / Tango Digitalent Award in 2001. Since then he has worked on short films and music videos including notably The Eel, distributed by onedotzero and screened internationally, ISIS 'Holy Tears' music video, and Mogwai’s ‘Batcat’.

In 2007 he was commissioned by Warp X to write and direct Say You Love Satan, co-written with Edinburgh Comedy Award winner Phil Nichol.

He directed a long-form video for Tool's 1992 song "Opiate", which was released for its 30th anniversary in 2022, and has worked extensively on the visuals for their live concerts. He also has a credit for "Visual Effects" on their latest album Fear Inoculum, which contains a new 10 minute video directed by Adam Jones.

He is currently associated with Brainfeeder Films in the US and has worked with director Eddie Alcazar on his feature film Perfect.

=== Video art ===
In 2006 he produced the short ‘Belladonna’ with Musician Matthew Rozeik. The piece was commissioned by onedotzero and the Victoria and Albert Museum.

During this period he also produced 92 a work commissioned by the Hayward Gallery to promote the exhibition “Undercover Surrealism” surrounding the work of Georges Bataille. The work features music by dark/ambient musician Lustmord.

=== Art work ===
Hailstone provided the cover artwork for Necro Deathmort's first two albums This Beat is Necrotronic and Music of Bleak Origin.

=== Feature film work ===
Dominic has provided visual effects and design work for films such as Harry Potter, IT, Alien Covenant, Possum, Overlord, Color out of Space, Alex Garland's Men and Morbius, based on the Marvel comic.

== Filmography ==
- "Deadenhead" (1990) short film (co-directed with Barney Clay).
- "Logboy goes Walkies" (2001) short film
- "Cherrywood Eyes" (2001) video for Lorien
- "Crooked Hill" (2002) video for Sonic Torpedoes
- "Transmission" (2003) video for Violent Delight
- "The Eel" (2004) short film
- "Paularay" (2005) video
- "Belladonna" (2006) video for onedotzero.
- "’92" (2006) video
- "Holy Tears" (2007) video for Isis
- "Batcat" (2009) video for Mogwai
- "Flowers" (2011) video work for Lustmord.
- "Opiate^{2}" (2022) video for Tool.
