= Palms (Palms album) =

- Album cover designed by Chuck Anderson

Studio album by Palms
- Released: June 25, 2013
- Genre: Post-metal; alternative rock; post-rock; shoegaze; dream pop
- Length: 46:56
- Label: Ipecac Records; IPC-139
- Producer: Palms

Professional ratings
Aggregate scores
| Source | Rating |
|---|---|
| Metacritic | (74/100) |
Review scores
| Source | Rating |
| AllMusic | 4/5 stars |
| Blabbermouth.net | 9/10 |
| Consequence of Sound | 3/5 stars |
| Drowned in Sound | 7/10 stars |
| MusicOMH | 4.5/5 stars |
| Pitchfork | 6.5/10 |
| The Skinny | 5/5 stars |

Palms is the first studio album by the post metal band Palms. It was released in 2013 in CD digipack, limited edition vinyl, limited edition cassette and digital download formats by Ipecac Records. The album was made available for streaming by Spin on June 18, 2013, one week before its release. Upon its release, Palms debuted at No. 55 on the Billboard 200 and received positive reviews. The album has been described as post-metal and alternative rock, much like singer Chino Moreno's main band, Deftones.

== Track listing ==
All tracks are written by Palms.

| No. | Title | Length |
|---|---|---|
| 1. | "Future Warrior" | 7:56 |
| 2. | "Patagonia" | 6:40 |
| 3. | "Mission Sunset" | 9:57 |
| 4. | "Shortwave Radio" | 6:56 |
| 5. | "Tropics" | 5:44 |
| 6. | "Antarctic Handshake" | 9:41 |
| Total length: | | 46:56 |

Japanese and cassette edition (bonus track)
| No. | Title | Length |
|---|---|---|
| 7. | "Shortwave Radio (Demo)" | 6:46 |
| Total length: | | 53:42 |

10th anniversary edition
| No. | Title | Length |
|---|---|---|
| 1. | "Opening Titles" | 5:56 |
| 2. | "Future Warrior" | 7:56 |
| 3. | "Patagonia" | 6:41 |
| 4. | "Mission Sunset" | 9:58 |
| 5. | "Shortwave Radio" | 6:57 |
| 6. | "Tropics" | 5:44 |
| 7. | "Antarctic Handshake" | 9:42 |
| 8. | "End Credits" | 4:51 |
| Total length: | | 57:45 |

== Personnel ==
Palms album personnel adapted from AllMusic.

Band members

- Chino Moreno – vocals
- Jeff Caxide – bass
- Aaron Harris – drums, engineering, mixing
- Bryant Clifford Meyer – guitar, keyboards, engineering

Additional personnel

- Chuck Anderson – artwork, design
- Chris Common – digital mastering
- James Plotkin – vinyl mastering
- Travis Shinn – photography
