= Sawblade (Isis EP) =

EP by Isis
- Released: November 1999
- Recorded: 1999
- Studios: God City Studios; Massachusetts
- Genres: Sludge metal; doom metal
- Length: 30:20
- Labels: Hydra Head Records (HH666-41.5); Tortuga Recordings (TR-008)
- Producers: Kurt Ballou; Isis

Isis chronology
The Red Sea (1999)	Sawblade (1999)	Celestial (2000)

The Sawblade EP is a limited edition extended play by American post-metal band Isis. It was released in 1999 by Hydra Head Records.

== Background ==
Sawblade is a handmade CD-R attached to a full-sized metallic saw blade. It was sold during Isis' tour with Neurosis and Candiria, which began in November 1999. Hydra Head Records made 200 hand-numbered copies, which were sold at a limit of 15 per night, with leftovers given to friends of the band as a year-end "thank you" gift. Tortuga Recordings later pressed 250 vinyl copies, available via mail order and during Isis' summer 2000 tour with The Dillinger Escape Plan and Candiria.

"Emission of the Signal" and "House of Low Culture" are instrumental tracks that were constructed by Aaron Turner and Jeff Caxide at home. "Streetcleaner" and "Hand of Doom" are cover versions of songs originally by Godflesh and Black Sabbath, respectively. Both tracks were recorded by Kurt Ballou at God City Studios during the Red Sea sessions in 1999. "Streetcleaner" later appeared on Isis' 2000 split release with Pig Destroyer.

The Japanese double CD release of Mosquito Control and The Red Sea features both cover songs as bonuses; "Streetcleaner" appears at the end of the Mosquito Control disc, and "Hand of Doom" appears at the end of the Red Sea disc. Both tracks were later selected for inclusion on the posthumous compilation album Temporal.

== Track listing ==
Tracks 1 and 4 written by Aaron Turner and Jeff Caxide

1. "Emission of the Signal" – 4:53
2. "Streetcleaner" – 5:42 (Broadrick)
3. "Hand of Doom" – 8:36 (Iommi/Osbourne/Ward/Butler)
4. "House of Low Culture" – 11:09

== Personnel ==
Sawblade personnel adapted from liner notes.

Isis

- Aaron Turner – vocals, guitar, design
- Jeff Caxide – bass
- Aaron Harris – drums
- Michael Gallagher – guitar
- Jay Randall – electronics and vocals (track 2)
- Bryant Clifford Meyer (credited but did not perform) (Note: Bryant Clifford Meyer is credited on Sawblade as a member of Isis; however, the first material he recorded with the band was Celestial in January and February of 2000.)

Other personnel

- Kurt Ballou – recording and production (tracks 2 and 3)
- Jason Hellmann – photography
