= Oceanic Remixes/Reinterpretations =

Oceanic Remixes

Remix album by Isis
- Released: 2004
- Recorded: 2002–2004
- Length: 91:57
- Labels: Robotic Empire (original LPs); Hydra Head Records (2×CD & 2×LP) (HH666-83)
- Producers: Isis; Matt Bayles

Isis chronology
Live.02 (2004)	Oceanic Remixes (2004)	Live.03 (2005)

Oceanic: Remixes & Reinterpretations is a 2004 compilation of remixes by various artists of songs from Isis' 2002 album Oceanic. The album was initially released across a series of four 12" vinyl EPs earlier in 2004; Robotic Empire, the label in control of those original vinyl releases, made available a compilation of all four vinyl EPs in one set on July 19, 2006.

Frontman Aaron Turner has stated that he was surprised by the response of the collaborators; having expected half of those contacted by the band to respond, all but two provided material for the series. The stated intent of the project was to allow further exploration of the ambient, electronic and abstract side of Isis, but to delegate it to the “more capable hands” of musicians outside the band whose work Isis admired.

Tim Hecker's "Carry (Second Version)" did not appear on the original Oceanic Remixes LPs and is exclusive to the Remixes/Reinterpretations compilation.

== Reception ==
Professional ratings
Review scores
Source	Rating
Allmusic	4/5 stars
Aquarian Weekly	A+
Encyclopedia of Popular Music	3/5 stars
Mondo Sonoro	8/10
OndaRock	5/10
Pitchfork Media	6.2/10

In reviewing, Patrick Slevin of the Aquarian Weekly gave an effusive verdict, commanding that “everyone else should buy Oceanic first, then buy this.” He argues that Remixes “respects the overall spirit and feel of Oceanic, moving into each song with care and deliberate attention, which makes [it] just as pleasing, stimulating and soothing to listen to as its parent recording.” Pitchfork Media's Brandon Stosuy felt that not all Isis fans would enjoy the album, and that the opposite was also true as it may appeal to those not fond of Isis' work. He was critical of much of the material, but saved special praise for Justin Broadrick's rendition of "Hym", arguing that it represents a “coda [which] adds a bit of last-minute revelation” to the piece.

== Track listing ==
All source material is written by Isis.

Disc one
No.	Title	Remix artist	Length
1.	"Weight"	Fennesz	6:34
2.	"False Light (Carry Edit)"	Ayal Naor, featuring Maria Christopher	7:53
3.	"Hym"	Thomas Köner	6:19
4.	"The Other"	James Plotkin	9:49
5.	"Carry (First Version)"	Tim Hecker	4:26
6.	"Maritime"	Teledubgnosis	9:24
7.	"Maritime"	Mike Patton	3:43
Total length:			48:04

Disc two
No.	Title	Remix artist	Length
1.	"The Beginning and the End"	Venetian Snares	5:05
2.	"Carry (Second Version)"	Tim Hecker	5:21
3.	"False Light (Deadverse)"	The Oktopus	5:30
4.	"Carry: Like I Will Love Her Forever? (Fuckin Die!!!)"	DJ Speedranch, featuring Guilty Connector	5:51
5.	"From: Sinking, To: Drowning"	Destructo Swarmbots	7:14
6.	"Hym"	Justin Broadrick	14:54
Total length:			43:53

== Personnel ==
Source material (original tracks)

- Jeff Caxide – bass, production
- Aaron Harris – drums, production
- Michael Gallagher – guitar, production
- Bryant Clifford Meyer – electronics, guitar, vocals, production
- Aaron Turner – vocals, guitar, production, art design
- Maria Christopher – vocals on "The Beginning and the End", "Weight" and "Carry"
- Ayal Naor – additional instrumentation on "The Beginning and the End" and "Weight"
- Matt Bayles – engineering, mixing, production
- Ed Brooks – mastering

Remix material

- Fennesz – production / manipulation / instrumentation
- Ayal Naor – production / manipulation / instrumentation
- Thomas Köner – production / manipulation / instrumentation
- James Plotkin – production / manipulation / instrumentation
- Tim Hecker – production / manipulation / instrumentation
- Teledubgnosis – production / manipulation / instrumentation
- Mike Patton – production / manipulation / instrumentation
- Venetian Snares – production / manipulation / instrumentation
- The Oktopus – production / manipulation / instrumentation
- DJ Speedranch featuring Guilty Connector – production / manipulation / instrumentation
- Destructo Swarmbots – production / manipulation / instrumentation
- Justin Broadrick – production / manipulation / instrumentation
- Nick Zampiello – mastering, editing

== Release history ==
Date	Title	Label	Catalogue number	Format
April 11, 2004	Oceanic Remixes Volume I	Robotic Empire	Robo 037	12″
July 13, 2004	Oceanic Remixes Volume II	Robotic Empire	Robo 038	12″
August 24, 2004	Oceanic Remixes Volume III	Robotic Empire	Robo 039	12″
November 23, 2004	Oceanic Remixes Volume IV	Robotic Empire	Robo 040	12″
July 7, 2004	Oceanic: Remixes / Reinterpretations	Daymare Recordings	PTCD-1001~2	2×CD
March 22, 2005	Oceanic: Remixes / Reinterpretations	Hydra Head Records	HH666-83	2×CD
July 19, 2006	Oceanic Remixes Vol. I–IV	Robotic Empire	Robo 037–040	4×12″ Box set
November 2016	Oceanic: Remixes / Reinterpretations	Hydra Head Records	HH666-83	2×LP
