= SGNL›05 =

EP by Isis
- Released: March 6, 2001
- Recorded: January–February 2000
- Studios: The Outpost; Stoughton, Massachusetts
- Genres: Sludge metal; post-metal
- Length: 35:49
- Labels: Neurot (NR012)
- Producers: Isis; Matt Bayles

Isis chronology
Celestial (2000)	SGNL›05 (2001)	Oceanic (2002)

Professional ratings
Review scores
Source	Rating
AllMusic	3/5 stars

SGNL›05 is the fourth extended play by American post-metal band Isis which acts as an extension to their debut album Celestial, as the tracks were all recorded during the Celestial recording sessions. Frontman Aaron Turner describes them as being “part of the same whole”, separated from each other because releasing a double album for the group's first full-length may have been overbearing for listeners.

Using the style he pioneered with his work in Godflesh and Jesu, Justin Broadrick reinterpreted the title track from Celestial into a new revision. It is presented on this EP as the closing track, an end to this chapter in the Isis discography considering the epic feel and experimental structure of the reworking that clearly foreshadows the direction the band would eventually take musically. The band has performed a version of the song "Celestial" live several times which fuses the original song and this remix together into a massive 16-minute rendition titled "Celestial (Ext/Alt)" on the Live.02 LP.

In addition to the standard CD and vinyl LP editions, SGNL›05 is available in a combined, deluxe release with its companion full-length, Celestial.

== Track listing ==
All tracks are written by Isis.

SGNL›05 track listing
No.	Title	Length
1.	"SGNL›05 (Final Transmission)"	2:52
2.	"Divine Mother (The Tower Crumbles)"	9:16
3.	"Beneath Below"	4:54
4.	"Constructing Towers"	8:24
5.	"Celestial (Signal Fills the Void)" (Remix by Justin Broadrick)	10:22
Total length:		35:49

== Personnel ==
Isis

- Jeff Caxide – bass, production
- Aaron Harris – drums, production
- Michael Gallagher – guitar, production
- Bryant Clifford Meyer – electronics, production
- Aaron Turner – guitar, vocals, production, art and graphic construction

Other personnel

- Matt Bayles – recording, mixing, production
- Justin Broadrick – remixing, additional production (track 5)
- Dave Merullo – mastering, audio editing
- Jason Hellmann – video stills
