= The Gersch =

American metal band

- Origin: Boston, Massachusetts, US
- Genres: Experimental rock, doom metal, hardcore punk
- Years active: 1996–1999, 2006-2007, 2013
- Labels: Tortuga Recordings, Polterchrist Records, Shock Value Records
- Members: Justin Sosnovski; Graham Hick; Bryant Clifford Meyer; Brian Lynn
- Past members: Jonathan Ruhe

The Gersch is a band founded in Boston, Massachusetts in 1996. They have been on extended hiatus since 1999 with the only activity since that time being the 2006 release of their self-titled album, mixed and produced by Justin Sosnovski, Graham Hick and Bryant Clifford Meyer, as well as a reunion performance on June 22, 2013 in Chicago, Illinois.

== Biography ==
Guitarists Justin Sosnovski, Graham Hick and B. Clifford Meyer got together in 1996 in Allston, Massachusetts to form a rock band. They eventually hooked up with drummer Jonathan Ruhe who performed with them throughout their original incarnation and also plays on their self-titled album.

In 1997 a 7-inch single of two songs by The Gersch was released by Tortuga Recordings. "Bloodbottom" b/w "Listwish" was release number 001 for Tortuga Recordings,.

In 1998 and 1999 The Gersch appeared on a Polterchrist Records compilation titled "Benefit For El Chupacabra", as well as a Tortuga Recordings compilation, "Metal Is A Tough Business". During these years Justin, and then a year later, Graham, left Boston and so had to leave the band. Clifford and Jonathan performed into 1999 as a two-piece, but finally put it on hiatus when Clifford joined Isis (band) and Jonathan joined the Boston-based Ho-Ag.

On June 6, 2006, they released a 45-minute CD titled "The Gersch" on Tortuga Recordings. It was released on LP by Shock Value Records under exclusive license from Tortuga Recordings on December 21, 2007. It was mixed, edited and produced by Justin Sosnovski, Graham Hick and Bryant Clifford Meyer, and put together from different recording sessions from the late 1990s. Nick Zampiello of New Alliance Studio in Boston mastered the album for CD and LP.

== Reunion ==
The Gersch ended their long hiatus by performing at The PRF "Excellent Italian" BBQ 2013, a four-day music festival in Chicago Illinois on June 22, 2013. This was their first public performance in 15 years. The lineup included original members Justin Sosnovski, Graham Hick and Bryant Clifford Meyer (ISIS, Red Sparowes, Taiga, Palms) on vocals and guitars, with Brian Lynn (Indian, Behold! The Living Corpse) on drums. The PRFBBQ is an annual underground music festival put together by an international collective of musicians and artists who congregate around the Electrical Audio studio web forums.

== Genre ==
Their sound is a combination of classic rock, punk rock, hardcore, metal and noise. They are commonly labeled doom metal, avant garde, post-metal, drone-metal and sludge-metal. They have borrowed and helped to evolve a sound pioneered by the likes of Black Sabbath, Sleep, Kyuss, Neurosis, High on Fire and even Black Flag. Some reviews have also compared their sound to the roster of bands that appeared on the Minneapolis-based label Amphetamine Reptile during the 1990s.

== Members ==
- Justin Sosnovski: guitar, vocals (1996-1997, 2006-2007, 2013)
- Graham Hick: guitar, vocals (1996-1998, 2006-2007, 2013)
- Bryant Clifford Meyer: guitar, vocals (1996-1999, 2006-2007, 2013)
- Brian Lynn: drums (2013)

=== Past members ===
- Jonathan Ruhe: drums (1996-1999)

== Discography ==
- "Bloodbottom" b/w "Listwish". 7 inch 33 1/3RPM single. November 15, 1997. Tortuga Recordings No. 001.
- "Magnificent Desolation". Benefit for El Chupacabra CD. Spring 1998. A Polterchrist Records Compilation.
- "Face". Metal is a Tough Business CD. Summer 1999. A Tortuga Recordings Compilation.
- The Gersch s/t CD. June 6, 2006. Tortuga Recordings No. 034."Tortuga Press Materials".
- The Gersch s/t LP. December 21, 2007. Shock Value Records under exclusive license from Tortuga Recordings.
- Live From The Fallout Shelter thegersch.bandcamp.com. December 3, 2022 Graham F'ing Hick Productions. Recorded live at WJUL in Lowell, MA on June 9, 1997.

=== Related projects ===
- Isis (band)
- Red Sparowes
- Windmills by the Ocean
- Ho-Ag
- Taiga (band)
- Tombs (band)
- Palms (band)
- Indian
- Behold! The Living Corpse
