= The Mosquito Control EP =

EP by Isis
- Released: October 1998
- Recorded: August 1998
- Genres: Sludge metal; doom metal
- Length: 28:30
- Labels: Escape Artist (EA03.0) (EA03.2) (re-release) (EA03.8) (re-release)
- Producers: Isis, Kurt Ballou

Isis chronology
| Demo 98 (1998) | The Mosquito Control EP (1998) | The Red Sea (1999) |

Re-release cover
- The cover of the re-release.

Professional ratings
Review scores
| Source | Rating |
|---|---|
| Allmusic | 3/5 stars |

The Mosquito Control EP is the first extended play by American post-metal band Isis, released in 1998 by Escape Artist. The piece runs fluently through all 29 minutes, and all four songs are linked through consistent bouts of chaos and lyrics glued by the metaphor of using mosquitoes as a symbol for mankind, society, and population control.

== Background ==
The Mosquito Control EP introduces Isis's first major theme, the mosquito. The reissue of this EP features cover art depicting control towers (the central theme of Celestial).

Although it represents Isis' first studio release, it is actually their third recording as a group after two demo productions. The EP was the last recording containing founding member Chris Mereschuk, and Randy Larson left the band shortly before its recording; as such, “[t]here are things on this record that certainly would not have [sic] been written were it not for those people, and it represented a set of voices that was no longer apparent in the subsequent recordings.” Sonically, Aaron Turner feels that Isis “were starting to find [their] voice” with the release, citing “Life Under the Swatter” as “the beginning of a path on which we would synthesize heavy riffing with complex rhythmic patterns and textural/subdued passages”.

The recording process cost as little as $600 and lasted between three and four days. The first mix was deemed of insufficient quality, so a remastering was undertaken in 2002. In 2018, a remastered version was released with new artwork under Hydra Head.

"Relocation Swarm" features dialogue sampled from Twin Peaks.

== Track listing ==
The Mosquito Control EP
| No. | Title | Writer(s) | Length |
|---|---|---|---|
| 1. | "Poison Eggs" (sample) | Isis | 6:42 |
| 2. | "Life Under the Swatter" | Isis | 5:50 |
| 3. | "Hive Destruction" | Isis | 4:09 |
| 4. | "Relocation Swarm" | Isis | 11:48 |
| Total length: | | | 28:30 |

Japanese edition bonus track
| No. | Title | Writer(s) | Length |
|---|---|---|---|
| 1. | "Streetcleaner" | Green, Neville, Broadrick | 5:42 |

== Personnel ==
Band members

- Jeff Caxide – bass guitar
- Aaron Harris – drums
- Chris Mereschuk – electronics, vocals
- Aaron Turner – guitar, vocals, design, assembly

Other personnel

- Kurt Ballou – audio engineering, producing
- Dave Merullo – mastering, audio editing
