= In the Absence of Truth =

Studio album by ISIS
- Released: October 31, 2006
- Recorded: June 8 – July 2, 2006
- Studios: The Bomb Shelter; Los Angeles, California
- Genres: Post-metal; post-rock; progressive metal
- Length: 64:49
- Labels: Ipecac (CD); Conspiracy (vinyl); Robotic Empire (vinyl)
- Producers: Isis; Matt Bayles

ISIS chronology
Panopticon (2004)	In the Absence of Truth (2006)	Wavering Radiant (2009)

Singles from In the Absence of Truth
- 1. "Holy Tears" Released: February 5, 2008; 2. "Not in Rivers, But in Drops" Released: October 14, 2008

Inside cover
- The jewel case cover; the other cover is that of the external slipcase.

In the Absence of Truth is the fourth full-length studio album by American post-metal band ISIS, released by Ipecac Recordings on October 31, 2006. The vinyl release was handled by Conspiracy Records.

The album expands upon the group's previous full-length, Panopticon, further exploring lead singer Aaron Turner's clean vocals (though his former techniques, which relied more on screaming and growling, are still present as well). Musically, the album is dynamic, ranging from extended musical ambience to almost tribal drumming. Isis continued their lengthy songwriting; In the Absence of Truth is Isis' longest record, at almost 65 minutes.

== Recording ==
Details regarding the album were sparse; completion of the album was announced via a blog post on July 8, 2006. While the record was in the writing and recording stages, some band members were based in New York City and others in Los Angeles. Aaron Turner later confessed that the album "suffered" due to this situation. Jeff Caxide also felt discontent and dissatisfaction with the album, stating that In the Absence of Truth was “the kind of record I listen to and think ‘that could be better, and that could be better, and that could be better,’ and I think we all kind of felt that way”. Drummer Aaron Harris felt that the band pushed themselves too far musically, too; having learned a wealth of new techniques prior to its recording, he says he “grew so much as a drummer [...] that it was overwhelming even for me.” He continues: “I think I was trying to show off a little bit [...] I think everybody was.” The eventual record proved dissatisfactory, with him opining that “some of it sounded a bit jumbled. I think a lot of things were happening that we didn't know what to do with.”

== Themes ==
"Dulcinea"
"Dulcinea" was selected as a standout track by several reviewers.

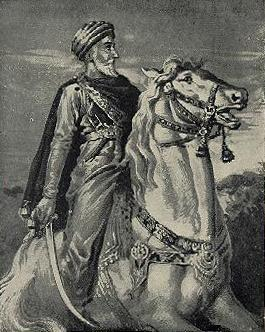
Hassan-i Sabbah, whose garden provided Turner with thematic material

The album features no printed lyrics, but it seems likely to connect with Isis's past legacy of concept albums, wherein some of the lyrics (such as "She was his queen" from "Dulcinea") relate to past themes. Turner has confirmed the presence of a concept: "I won't say what the concept is, but I can give you some clues about what inspired it: Hassan-i-Sabbah, the Islamic mystic cult leader, [Miguel de Cervantes'] Don Quixote, [Mark Z. Danielewski's] House of Leaves, and [Jorge Luis Borges'] Labyrinths." However; from repeated explanation of what inspired Oceanic and Panopticon, his stance changed. "Through explaining the last two albums time and time again, I just started to become weary of the topic, and I started to feel like I was losing my connection to the music and the lyrics simply from having repeated it so many times. And for me, personally, it's really important to maintain that connection as much as possible. I feel there's a lot of emphasis these days placed on explaining everything in such a fashion that there's really nothing left for the listener or reader to explore themselves. It's all spelled out. So it's interesting to leave some of that stuff open-ended so they have to do a little bit of legwork themselves." Drummer Aaron Harris explains this further, saying that the album is based “on personal perception of anything [...] and what's true and what's not true.”

Gitta Sereny's book on Nazi Minister of Arms, Albert Speer, also inspired Turner; to him, it illustrated how society has a “tendency to portray the enemy as very one-sided and one-dimensional.”

The album takes its title from a quote often attributed to Hassan-i-Sabbah: "Nothing is true, everything is permitted". When it comes to how this quote relates to the album's concept, Turner is again reluctant to reveal too much. "I'll just say that much of working on this record, for me, was about the power and nature of perception, and the ways in which it affects our behavior and the way we see the world," he says. "I'll just leave it at that, and people can draw their own conclusions."

Track titles explicitly reference Hassan-i-Sabah's garden Firdous e Bareen, and Dulcinea, a character in Don Quixote. In relation to Dulcinea, Turner does allow a hint at the meaning: "That is just toying with the idea of perception, and the very thin line between illusion and reality", he says.

The cover artwork is described as "somewhat representational", but that the gauze-like strips don't "necessarily indicate one specific object or another". However, Turner having previously stated that "the songwriting and the artwork come from the same place". It is "sort of at the heart of what [he] was writing about. And also, there's a progression of ideas from this very tightly bound, opaque mass into something that eventually starts to split up and open up and evolve into nothingness."

The band released lyrics from certain tracks ("Dulcinea", "Garden of Light") on T-shirt designs, and in 2009 all the album's lyrics were made available on their official website.

== Release ==
The release date was announced as October 31, 2006, shortly following the release of DVD Clearing the Eye and a collaboration with Aereogramme entitled In the Fishtank 14, both of which were released in September. To promote the album, Isis supported Tool on a North American tour from August to September. Following the release, they went on a headlining tour of North America.

=== Singles ===
In celebration of Isis' tenth anniversary, the tracks "Holy Tears" and "Not in Rivers, but in Drops" were each released in single format in February and October 2008, respectively. Each release contains the studio recording of the title track, a live rendition, a remix, and a music video.

== Reception ==
Professional ratings
Aggregate scores
Source	Rating
Metacritic	70/100
Review scores
Source	Rating
Allmusic	4.5/5 stars
Alternative Press	4/5 stars
The Aquarian	A+
Drowned in Sound	8/10
IGN	8.3/10
Ox-Fanzine	9/10
Pitchfork Media	8.3/10
Popmatters	8/10 stars
Stylus	B
Tiny Mix Tapes	3/5 stars

Overall, the album garnered positive reviews, receiving a 70% score on Metacritic, but it received criticism regarding certain aspects. For instance, a review in Q Magazine stated that the album uses "a powerful formula, but one the band perfected with their 2002 album Oceanic", and Delusions of Adequacy's Joe Davenport felt that "In the Absence of Truth finds the band both spinning its wheels and running out of ideas".

However, some reviews viewed that similarity as positive, and perceived it more as progression and evolution than repetition. Stylus Magazine repeated similar sentiments as those of the previous reviews, but did not feel that re-using a successful formula was a burden, Cosmo Lee saying "it's not Isis' fault that they sound unoriginal these days. All you have to do is pick up a copy of Decibel, open it to any page, and you’ll find someone counting the group as an influence [...] The songs are still long, the rhythms are still organic, and in general Isis still sounds like Isis". Despite having said this, the review is still very positive. PopMatters repeated the views of Lee, stating Isis are "a band knowing how to execute the formula to near-perfection", and Thom Jurek of Allmusic expanded upon that point further, stating "this set is not a brave leap [...] but a further look up the holy mountain to a new plateau, a hike to sacred ground". Drowned in Sound reviewer Mike Diver, however, viewed the album differently; that Isis have "pushed themselves on this album, striving to achieve something honestly different to what was released before it". An IGN review described it as "unique and free from boundaries", and it has been labeled as "Isis' masterpiece", as well as their "most compelling work to date". Writing for Alternative Press, Aaron Burgess states that "save for the brief distorted squalls of "Garden of Light" and the pummeling metallic grooves of "Not in Rivers, But in Drops," there's barely anything keeping Isis tethered to the rigid "post-metal" genre they helped inspire".

Isis have been onto something from the very beginning and got to the edge of the abyss with Oceanic. Panopticon took an oppressive yet wonderfully curious view of its surroundings. In the Absence of Truth takes them into its dark heart squalling, whispering, crawling, drunkenly falling into its center, punching, screaming, and kicking until there is nothing left but silence. This is rock in the 21st century, anything less is cowardice.

— Thom Jurek

The sound of the album drew complimentary comparisons to Tool and Godspeed You! Black Emperor, being praised for its subtlety and gradual evolution of structure. However, some critical responses to the similarity with Tool were not so positive, with Joe Davenport arguing that "In the Absence of Truth plays out like some mediocre hybrid of Tool and Panopticon". Brandon Stosuy of Pitchfork Media posits that "the set's so finely wound that on the first few listens it seemed like the steady diet of Tool had perhaps transformed Isis into an emaciated, innocuous version of their older selves". However, he continues to suggest that the album "just require[s] close (and repeated) listening to initiate an unravelling". Tracks selected as stand-outs include "Not in Rivers, but in Drops", "Garden of Light", and "Dulcinea", specifically praising the climax of the piece. "Holy Tears" is labeled as revealing the "true, outward strength of Isis", and is selected as "a beacon of light in the darkness" in an otherwise scathing Delusions of Adequacy review.

Decibel placed the album thirteenth in its top albums of 2006, as well as facetiously awarding Tool the "Isis Rip-off Band of the Year" award.

== Track listing ==
All tracks are written by Isis.

In the Absence of Truth track listing
No.	Title	Length
1.	"Wrists of Kings"	7:45
2.	"Not in Rivers, But in Drops"	7:48
3.	"Dulcinea"	7:10
4.	"Over Root and Thorn"	8:31
5.	"1,000 Shards"	6:17
6.	"All Out of Time, All Into Space"	3:04
7.	"Holy Tears"	7:04
8.	"Firdous e Bareen"	7:50
9.	"Garden of Light"	9:17
Total length:		64:49

== Personnel ==
Isis

- Jeff Caxide – bass guitar
- Aaron Harris – drums
- Michael Gallagher – guitar
- Bryant Clifford Meyer – electronics, guitar
- Aaron Turner – vocals, guitar, artwork

Guests

- Caleb Scofield – additional vocals on "1,000 Shards"
- Charley Turner – additional vocals on "Not in Rivers, but in Drops" and "Holy Tears"
- Troy Ziegler – additional percussion and acoustic guitar on "Firdous e Bareen"

Technical

- Matt Bayles – audio engineering, mixing, production
- Mike Gerlach – assistant engineer
- Ed Brooks – mastering
- Greg Moss – live sound
- Jason Hellmann – website design

== Chart positions ==
Chart	Peak position
US Billboard Top Heatseekers	6
US Billboard Top Independent Albums	20
