= Oceanic (Isis album) =

Studio album by ISIS
- Released: September 16, 2002
- Recorded: April–May 2002
- Studios: Fort Apache; Cambridge, Massachusetts; New Alliance; Boston, Massachusetts
- Genres: Post-metal; sludge metal
- Length: 63:20
- Label: Ipecac
- Producers: Isis; Matt Bayles

ISIS chronology
SGNL>05 (2001)	Oceanic (2002)	Panopticon (2004)

Oceanic is the second full-length album by American post-metal band ISIS, released on September 17, 2002, by Ipecac Recordings. On November 4, 2014, a remastered edition was released via Hydrahead/Ipecac Recordings. Since its release, Oceanic has received critical acclaim and has been regarded as a masterpiece.

On July 23, 2006, Isis performed Oceanic in its entirety at KOKO, Camden Town, London as part of the All Tomorrow's Parties curated Don't Look Back series. This performance was recorded and eventually released in 2009 as Live V. The track "Weight" was used in the 20th episode of the 1st season of the 2007 television series Friday Night Lights.

== Themes and concept ==
The album themes are considered to be an expansion on the bands 1999 EP The Red Sea, which includes themes of water throughout, death, emotional detachment, incest, and suicide.

Oceanic is a concept album (presumably told non-chronologically, or told through memories) about a man who, on the brink of emotional emptiness and numbness, finds a female counterpart who, prematurely, completes him (“The Beginning and the End"). However, he soon discovers that she has had a long-term incestuous relationship ("False Light", "Weight") with her brother throughout the man's relationship with her. ("Hym", "The Other"). After discovering this, it drives him back into his emotionally comatose state, and he subsequently commits suicide by drowning himself in the ocean. ("from sinking sands, he stepped into light's embrace").

The entire story is described by frontman Aaron Turner in a radio interview and in more nebulous terms in the album's booklet.

== Reception ==
Professional ratings
Review scores
Source	Rating
AllMusic	5/5 stars
Collector's Guide to Heavy Metal	8/10
Encyclopedia of Popular Music	4/5 stars
Metal Storm	9.3/10
OndaRock	8/10
Ox-Fanzine	8/10
Pitchfork	9.1/10
Rock Hard	8.5/10
Sputnikmusic	5/5 stars
Stylus	A−

The album’s style marks a distinct departure from their previous sound; up until this point, Isis had been characterised by crushing, distorted guitars and a coarse, unforgiving tone. With this album came the introduction of lengthy periods of clean guitar, large amounts of ambient noise and female vocals; a notable post-rock influence, first hinted at on SGNL>05 and Celestial. This transition was retrospectively labelled by FACT's Robin Jahdi as "one of the more eye-opening musical metamorphoses of the decade"; it has been described as "seminal". As Ben Richardson notes in the San Francisco Bay Guardian, the album's release "fomented an explosion of glacial, Neurosis-inspired instrumental 'post-metal'"; likewise it has been described as "the standard by which all post-metal albums have been judged since". It has retrospectively been labelled a "masterpiece".

As one reviewer notes, the album is in "a place somewhere between metal and hardcore and post-rock, a place where crunching guitars and hoarse, tuneless vocals and slow spaciness all converge and create something big and mean and delightful". The change of style proved trying for some long-standing fans, but beneficial in garnering a greater fanbase and the Neurosis-Godflesh comparisons began to weaken. The eschewing of sludgecore elements, and increased focus on atmospherics and post-rock elements whilst still retaining metal and hardcore elements led to the album being labelled by many as post-metal, and essentially as being the genre's progenitor. Some critics attribute it to having truly formed the genre, out of a previously nebulous definition. This leaning, in the direction of post-rock, was greeted with great critical acclaim; the presence of female vocals proved popular with many reviewers, and songs featuring those vocals are generally seen as stand-outs. Those songs include "The Beginning and the End", "Carry" and "Weight", all of which feature Maria Christopher of 27.

Oceanic was named Terrorizer number one album of 2002, and in Drowned in Sound's "Our 66" introspective of the best albums of the past six years, it placed fifth. Pitchfork Media ranked it as 2002's 31st-best record, rating it as having “more depth than its touted predecessor”. It was greeted with great critical acclaim from not only niche magazines, but also from popular music reviewers, such as AllMusic. In some ways, this release pushed Isis to the fore of their genre, and enabled them to branch out to new fans. Beyond yearly accolades, it ranked fourth in Decibel's "Top 100 Albums of the Decade" special issue. In 2017, Rolling Stone ranked it at No. 72 on their list of the "100 Greatest Metal Albums of All Time".

Some fans and critics will point out that the album had a notable influence on the metal/post-rock scene in the years following. In 2004, Cult of Luna released Salvation; taking a similar stylistic departure from previous LPs Cult of Luna and The Beyond as Oceanic took from preceding albums SGNL>05 and Celestial. The band itself cites Isis as an influence, and a review in Terrorizer posits that Oceanic covered "fairly similar aquatic terrain" as their release Salvation.

== Remixes ==
The album was remixed in a series of four vinyl EPs, named Oceanic Remixes/Interpretations Volumes I-IV and released on Robotic Empire Records in 2004 and 2005. Contributors included Mike Patton, Venetian Snares and Justin Broadrick. These tracks, and an additional track by Tim Hecker, were compiled into a two-CD release on Hydra Head Records, entitled Oceanic: Remixes & Reinterpretations.

== Track listing ==
All tracks are written by Isis.

Oceanic track listing
No.	Title	Length
1.	"The Beginning and the End"	8:02
2.	"The Other"	7:15
3.	"False Light"	7:42
4.	"Carry"	6:46
5.	"-"	2:06
6.	"Maritime"	3:03
7.	"Weight"	10:46
8.	"From Sinking"	8:24
9.	"Hym"	9:14
Total length:		63:20

== Personnel ==
Isis

- Jeff Caxide – bass, production
- Aaron Harris – drums, production
- Michael Gallagher – guitar, production
- Bryant Clifford Meyer – electronics, guitar, production, vocals on "Hym"
- Aaron Turner – vocals, guitar, production, album art and layout

Guests

- Maria Christopher – vocals on "The Beginning and the End", "Weight" and "Carry"
- Ayal Naor – additional instrumentation on "The Beginning and the End" and "Weight"

Technical

- Matt Bayles – engineering, mixing, production
- Ed Brooks – mastering
- Mélanie Benoit – album photography
- Jason Hellmann – album photography

== Release history ==
Date	Label	Region	Catalogue number	Format
September 16, 2002	Ipecac Recordings	United States	IPC-032	CD
October 17, 2002	Escape Artist Records	United States	EA12.0	2×LP
October 2002	Trust No One Recordings	Europe	TNO018	2×LP
September 13, 2002	Ritual Records	Japan	HWCY-1109	CD
2007	Level Plane Records	United States	LP105	2×LP
January 22, 2010	Daymare Recordings	Japan	DYMC114	CD
