= Panopticon (album) =

Studio album by Isis
- Released: October 19, 2004
- Recorded: June–July 2004
- Studios: Paramount Studios; Los Angeles, California
- Genres: Post-metal; progressive metal; sludge metal
- Length: 59:03
- Labels: Ipecac (CD) (IPC-057); Trust No One (vinyl) (TNO027) (Europe); Robotic Empire (vinyl) (ROBO 041) (US); Daymare Recordings (CD) (PTCD-1012) (Japan)
- Producers: Isis; Matt Bayles

Isis chronology
Oceanic (2002)	Panopticon (2004)	In the Absence of Truth (2006)

Vinyl edition cover
- The cover of Robotic Empire's vinyl edition.

Panopticon is the third full-length album by American post-metal band Isis, released by Ipecac Recordings on October 19, 2004. The album's title is derived from philosopher Jeremy Bentham's panopticon prison ideal and philosopher/historian Michel Foucault's later allegorical appropriation of the concept. The liner notes also include quotes from technology writer Howard Rheingold and futurist Alex Steffen; as a concept album, Panopticon's focus is on the proliferation of surveillance technologies throughout modern society and the government's role in that spread.

Critical response to Panopticon was generally very warm; as it followed 2002's critically acclaimed Oceanic, many reviewers were quick to hold the two in comparison. The consensus was that Panopticon represented a progression, of sorts. The album's sound continued Isis' departure from the structures of sludge metal – which had been the hallmarks of their earlier material – and continued along the trajectory of post-metal, achieved by heightened use of melody and clean vocals.

== Writing, recording and release ==
Writing for the record began in September 2003, soon after Isis had relocated from Boston to Los Angeles. According to guitarist Mike Gallagher, "we started working on ideas for songs and sounds as individuals, in pairs or as a whole group until we were able to shape the ideas into songs that we were all happy with and could stand behind". While some tracks originated from "little jams" the band would do at sound check, the majority of the album was created in time dedicated to writing new material. Gallagher adds that "musically speaking, Panopticon came out a couple of ideas that had been kicking around in our heads for some time, but the bulk of it was composed after we decided that it was time to do a new record. The writing process consisted mostly of an individual starting the core of an idea for a song at home then either pairing off with someone else or bringing it to everyone where it was worked on and refined until everyone was satisfied." According to Jeff Caxide, this process was significantly different from that of previous Isis albums, as "everyone wrote a lot on this record. There is not one song that could be credited to one person".

According to Turner, the album's inception and sound were organic, rather than engineered: "we were interested in exploring ambient spaces a lot more—and these things tend to dictate a longer structure. It wasn't a conscious decision on our part; I guess it's just the nature of the style we write in."

After having worked with members of 27 as guest musicians on previous full-length Oceanic, for Panopticon Isis turned to Justin Chancellor, bassist of tour-mates Tool. According to Turner, "he was one of the first names on the list. He's in a band that we all mutually respect and we felt like he was a person that understood what we were doing and could maintain a focus on what we were trying to attain. But he also has some interesting facets of his own musical personality that we thought would blend well with our style." Wavering Radiant, Isis' 2009 final album, features Adam Jones, also of Tool, as a guest musician.

Recording took place at Paramount Studios, Los Angeles, California, from June to July 2004, with the album being produced by long-time collaborator Matt Bayles. The album was recorded onto analogue tape initially; after returning to the studio post-release in order to retrieve the master reels, half of them were discovered to be missing, presumed stolen. The album saw release in CD format on October 19, 2004, by Ipecac Recordings, whilst vinyl release was handled by Robotic Empire in the United States and Trust No One in Europe. The Japanese edition was handled by Daymare Recordings, who released a special edition with an enhanced video and digipak packaging. It entered the US Billboard Independent Albums chart on November 6 at number 47 and remained there for a week; this represented Isis' first chart exposure in any capacity.

In support of the album's release, Isis toured extensively. Their world tour took in a long stretch in the United States, dates in Australia, a spate in Japan with Converge and Mastodon and a further lengthy spell in Europe. Besides the heavy touring regimen, they also performed at the Los Angeles Museum of Contemporary Art to support an exhibition of 50's and 60's minimalist art.

A music video – Isis' first – was released for the track "In Fiction", directed by Josh Graham and shot during late 2004; the track was not, however, released as a single. The video deals heavily with the album's overarching theme of surveillance, as a young female protagonist flees five faceless observers and the ubiquity of video surveillance. At the close of the video, she transforms into a black miasma, which expands as tendrils grow from the fug. Its feel is described by Lee Wang of PopMatters as utilising a narrative mode similar to the cult 1962 French science fiction movie, La jetée; he also brings attention to the video's blue-and-black palate, much as is used on the album artwork, "simulating" black-and-white. This similarity was proved intentional, as guitarist Michael Gallagher attested to it being an intentional allusion. Two tracks from Panopticon – "Grinning Mouths" and "In Fiction" – were featured in the 2007 Flemish film Ex Drummer.

== Theme ==
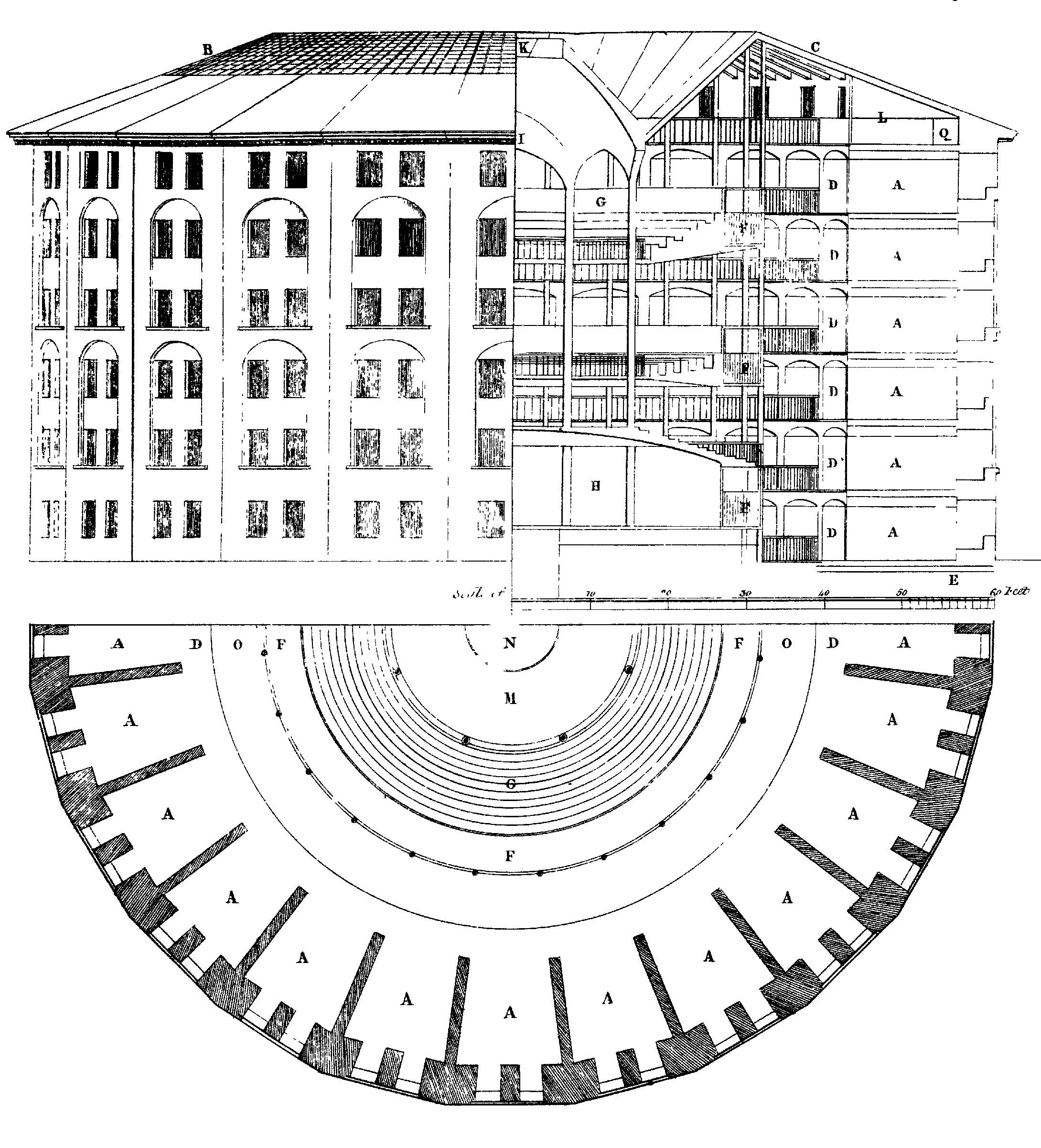
Panopticon blueprint by Jeremy Bentham, 1791

The album's central concept is that of its namesake, the panopticon: a form of prison envisioned by utilitarian Jeremy Bentham in 1785; a central observation tower surrounded by windowless cells. Bentham's intention was that the prisoners be placated through the fear of constant surveillance, which he described as “a new mode of obtaining power of mind over mind, in a quantity hitherto without example.” While the design did not come to fruition during Bentham's time, it has been seen as an important development. For instance, the design was invoked by Michel Foucault (in Discipline and Punish) as metaphor for modern "disciplinary" societies and its pervasive inclination to observe and normalise. Foucault proposes that not only prisons but all hierarchical structures like the army, the school, the hospital and the factory have evolved through history to resemble Bentham's Panopticon. More recently, it has been used to describe the Internet. The liner notes also quote technology writer Howard Rheingold and futurist Alex Steffen, speaking of their concern with the proliferation of surveillance throughout modern society and how that constitutes a "panopticon society".

Both Foucault and Bentham are quoted in the liner notes, and Turner is forthcoming about their influence; both as political commentary and polemic material.

I can see why Bentham found the design to be inspirational and possibly rewarding, but it also strikes me as this completely insidious and manipulative idea at the same time, a way of controlling and segregating individuals – which is the focal point of Foucault’s essay.

One thing that I was referring to is maybe a certain controlling force, the modern parallel of it would be the US government and specifically its administration. If you want to look at it from that perspective then there is a certain kind of a central power and they're using the technology to further their means of surveillance. It's a different sort of construction but the same idea: there's a central controlling force and they're using multiple tools in the case of the internet in sort of surveying and directing the focus of their populace.

— Aaron Turner, interviewed by Andreas Kohl

Although reviewers have read political intonations into the album's ostensible themes, deeming it “unashamedly prog in its ambition and dimensions”, Turner is reluctant to admit to such an agenda. "I'd hesitate to call the record 'political' because Isis has never taken a public political stand on anything. At the same time, it's intended to draw a parallel between the system that Bentham created and what's going on in the world right now". Likewise, he notes that the album is “absolutely not about a political agenda. I always try to write about stuff that is specific to my life during the time I write an album. And I try to find things that I'm emotionally and intellectually attached to. We've never been a political band. But right now politics are such a great importance. You can travel everywhere and you simply cannot ignore them. And so this is one of the main things that have been occupying my mind during the creation of this record. So beyond these things just being interesting themselves they have a lot of relevance to what's going on in the world right now [...] I think these things are relevant to everybody's lives and specifically to me and this band and what we experienced through living in this country over the last couple of years. And also I think my lyrics are so abstract and fragmented sometimes that I feel like those things are a better representation of what I'm writing about than printed lyrics might be.” Despite his denial that Panopticon is politically motivated, Turner does refer to the then-incumbent George W. Bush administration's tenure as a source of inspiration; about how Bentham's essay bore relevance to “hit home in terms of how [it] is treating its own citizens outside and within the country.”

Beyond the macroscopic, Turner has admitted that this album is more personal than previous releases. “This record is a lot more organic [than Oceanic] to me. It indeed is a lot more focused in a way that it is a lot more coherent than Oceanic was. I do feel that it has a wider emotional feel because it is a lot more personal stuff of myself behind it in the content. I don't really know how this comes across in the music. There is a lot more things in it that I was dealing with while writing the record and since, let's say Celestial for instance. It's hard to say actually.”

Allmusic's Wade Kergan felt the album artwork, an almost isometric aerial photograph of South San Francisco and San Bruno, California, “fits perfectly with the epic music on the disc itself”, while Pitchfork Media's Brandon Stosuy characterized it as “satellite spy” photography. Turner noted that the connection between the artwork and the theme was “certainly intentional”, further stating that he “wanted it to be something that was subtle, but not obvious straight away.”

== Sound ==
In describing the album's sound, critics often referred to bands operating on similar sonic strata as Isis. Allmusic reviewer Wade Kergan noted: “[t]he sound is "as angular as post-rock forefathers Slint and as cosmically expansive as Neurosis, yet closer to the intensity of hardcore than either of them”, while an Uncut review stated that Panopticon operates at “the rarely-explored mid-point between My Bloody Valentine and Slayer”. Furthermore, its sound was compared to that of High on Fire, Tool, A Perfect Circle, Mogwai, Sigur Ros, Pink Floyd, The Cure, Godspeed You! Black Emperor and Ride by various reviewers.

It also becomes obvious that from the time of our first demo we've been constantly going into that direction through becoming more and more atmospheric, having the textural elements becoming more and more to the forefront and obviously becoming more melodic with each release.

— Aaron Turner, interviewed by Andreas Kohl

Many reviewers compared the album with Isis' seminal previous record, Oceanic, often noting a 'progression'. Turner himself stated: “I do agree that it is a natural progression from Oceanic. It absolutely is an evolution and a step forward.” Sonically, compared with Oceanic, “the drums and vocals are submerged, the riffs intricately monolithic” and there is an increased prominence lent to electronics and synths; this led to it being characterised as “a little more polished”.

As with all Isis releases, the lyrics are almost indecipherable; something of which Turner is conscious, as well as its implications. “Even if you are a native speaker it is sometimes impossible to figure the lyrics out properly. I'm conflicted about that from time to time. But then I always think that I'm giving enough with the text that's included, the artwork and the imagery that gives people some clue to get into it. But leaves it open ended in a certain degree about the intention behind it. [...] While making an album it also is music first for us and lyrics second.” Writing for Decibel, Andrew Bonazelli noted that although only 30 percent of the lyrics were understandable, they were “extremely thoughtful”.

"Altered Course"
"Altered Course" was described as one “of the most emotionally engaging rock songs of a decade, or more”. This excerpt contains the transition from the introductory movement into the early crescendo.

Many critics tied the album's conceptual roots with its sound; it was described as “[evoking] a sense of creeping voyeurism”. Some noted, though, that this notion is ‘subverted’ by the album's sound. As Mike Diver of Drowned in Sound explains in a glowing review, “['Panopticon' is] a misleading title; nothing terrifying emerges from the multiple layers of sound. Indeed, as far as Isis records go, this is positively joyous”. Similarly, its feel, likened to contemporaries Pelican's 2005 record The Fire in Our Throats Will Beckon the Thaw, is described by Andrew Bonazelli as ‘triumphant’.

== Reception ==
Professional ratings
Review scores
Source	Rating
Allmusic	4.5/5 stars
Austin Chronicle	3/5 stars
Drowned in Sound	10/10
OndaRock	7.5/10
Ox-Fanzine	9/10
Pitchfork	8.4/10
Rock Hard	9.5/10
Sputnikmusic	4.5/5 stars
Tiny Mix Tapes	4/5 stars
Uncut	3/5 stars

The critical response to Panopticon was generally very warm; some offered extremely high praise, whilst others deemed it average. Although it was not lambasted by any major publications, several deemed it slightly inferior to Oceanic, released two years previously. As Michael Chamy noted in his review for the Austin Chronicle, it does not "reach the heights or descend to the depths of Oceanic, but it's an amazing journey to a place unlike any other." A Tiny Mix Tapes review agreed, stating that Panopticon "doesn't outshine Oceanic". Detailing this further, a Punknews reviewer noted: “the only flaw that I found in this otherwise exemplary recording was the less engrossing overall structure of the record; while Oceanic was [...] novel like in its structure with each chapter forming an overall arc, Panopticon is more like a series of short stories – disconnected, perhaps – but clearly penned by the same hand.” Others disagreed; Pitchfork's Brandon Stosuy held it to be a “stronger record” than Oceanic. Isis' next album, 2006's In the Absence of Truth, was met rather less fondly by both critics and the band themselves.

Reviewers agreed that “those with long attention spans will find [the album] utterly rewarding”; as a Punknews review expounds, "this record demands a great deal from the listener – attention and patience, certainly – those who give it a chance will find a band that is truly special, and manages to consistently exceed expectations." Similarly focusing on the length of the tracks, Brandon Stosuy of Pitchfork Media branded the record "stellar classical music". This contributed to “the record [being] imparted with a completely new melodic sense [making the album] their most friendly and accessible work to date”.

Nick Green highlighted "Wills Dissolve" as a standout track, whilst Drowned in Sound's Mike Diver selected "Backlit" and "Altered Course" as “two of the most emotionally engaging rock songs of a decade, or more”. Chamy deemed "Altered Course" “a masterfully constructed glacial flow, with Aaron Harris' heavy drumming keeping the mast pointed through the crushing turbulence”. Opener "So Did We" was deemed, throughout the entire Isis back catalog, “second only in visceral satisfaction to [Celestial's] 'Celestial (The Tower)'”. Dissecting that track further, the Punknews review found that "[t]he structure of repeating themes with an underlying 'storyline' is more like the classical Aristotelean narrative than a song; with no conventional verses, choruses or anything else familiar to be found."

The album also received a mixed review from Pat Long of Uncut, who summarized the album as "Red-eyed ambient metal droning" and questioned the relationship between its themes of surveillance and the nature of the mostly instrumental music itself, despite concluding that "those with long attention spans will find [this album] utterly rewarding." Mike Diver of Drowned in Sound was unequivocal in his assessment, stating: "[t]hat this is the metal record of the year is indisputable". Decibel went on to rank Panopticon as the 33rd best album of the decade, while Sputnikmusic ranked it the 74th best, the latter's Channing Freeman writing that the album "was free of the gimmicks that plague the genre, and even though countless other bands would beat their formula to death, Panopticon still stands head and shoulders above other albums of its kind."

== Track listing ==
All tracks are written by Isis.

Panopticon track listing
No.	Title	Length
1.	"So Did We"	7:31
2.	"Backlit"	7:43
3.	"In Fiction"	8:58
4.	"Wills Dissolve"	6:47
5.	"Syndic Calls"	9:39
6.	"Altered Course" (instrumental; featuring Justin Chancellor)	9:58
7.	"Grinning Mouths"	8:27
Total length:		59:03

- A remastered version of Panopticon, mixed by Mika Jussila and released on April 29, 2014, contains extended outros to "In Fiction" and "Wills Dissolve", increasing the album's length to 59:14.

== Personnel ==
Isis

- Jeff Caxide – bass guitar
- Aaron Harris – drums
- Michael Gallagher – guitar
- Bryant Clifford Meyer – electronics, guitar
- Aaron Turner – vocals, guitar, photography, design

Guests

- Justin Chancellor – additional sounds and bass guitar on "Altered Course"

Technical

- Matt Bayles – audio engineering, mixing, production
- Bill Dooley – mastering
- Greg Moss – live sound
