= Celestial (Isis album) =

Studio album by Isis
- Released: April 3, 2000
- Recorded: January–February 2000
- Studios: The Outpost; Stoughton, Massachusetts
- Genres: Post-metal; sludge metal
- Length: 51:58
- Labels: Escape Artist (EA07.0); Hydra Head (HH666-59); Ipecac (reissue) (IPC-145)
- Producers: Isis; Matt Bayles

Isis chronology
Sawblade EP (1999)	Celestial (2000)	SGNL>05 (2001)

Re-release cover
- The cover of Ipecac Recordings' 2013 re-release

Celestial is the debut studio album by American post-metal band Isis, released in 2000 by Escape Artist and Hydra Head Records. It is their third "official" solo release and first full length.

A year later, Isis released SGNL>05, an EP designed to act as an extension to Celestial; its tracks were all directly culled from the Celestial recording sessions. Frontman Aaron Turner describes them as being “part of the same whole”, separated from each other because releasing a double album for the group's first full-length may have been overbearing for listeners.

In addition to the regular CD and vinyl LP editions, Celestial is available in a double release, coupled with its sister EP, SGNL>05. On June 5, 2013, it was announced that Celestial would be re-issued by Ipecac Recordings with new artwork from Turner, as well as the audio having been recently remastered by James Plotkin.

== Themes ==
Turner has acknowledged that the album deals with the erosion of privacy as technology advances, in a similar vein to 2004's Panopticon; however, he states that the theme is dealt with in a “more primitive way” on Celestial. Towers are described as ‘thematic’ material by Decibel's Joe Gross.

== Reception ==
Professional ratings
Review scores
Source	Rating
AllMusic	4/5 stars
Collector's Guide to Heavy Metal	7/10
Exclaim!	8/10
The Line of Best Fit	8.5/10
Metal Hammer	4/5 stars
Mondo Sonoro	9/10
OndaRock	6.5/10
PopMatters	7/10
Stylus Magazine	A

Celestial was named the 53rd-finest metal record of the decade by Decibel, stating that "it's seen as a transitional record between the band's early work and the post-metal benchmarks such as Oceanic, but Celestial holds up in ways different from their later work [...] the elements of the greatness are present, but rawer, more direct." Rock Sound placed it at #3 in their rundown of their top albums of 2001 and Metal Hammer named it one of the 20 best metal albums of 2000. In 2011, William York, writing for AllMusic, described the album as Isis' best, and argues that the record needs to be “given time” – that it eventually develops an “almost epic feel”.

== Track listing ==
All tracks are written by Isis.

Celestial track listing
No.	Title	Length
1.	"SGNL>01"	0:55
2.	"Celestial (The Tower)"	9:42
3.	"Glisten"	6:35
4.	"Swarm Reigns (Down)"	6:02
5.	"SGNL>02"	0:51
6.	"Deconstructing Towers"	7:30
7.	"SGNL>03"	0:35
8.	"Collapse and Crush"	5:55
9.	"C.F.T. (New Circuitry and Continued Evolution)"	5:43
10.	"Gentle Time"	7:02
11.	"SGNL>04 (End Transmission)"	1:07
Total length:		51:58

== Personnel ==
All personnel credits for Celestial are adapted from the album's liner notes.

Isis

- Jeff Caxide – bass, production
- Aaron Harris – drums, production
- Michael Gallagher – guitar, production
- Bryant Clifford Meyer – electronics, guitar, production, vocals on "Gentle Time"
- Aaron Turner – vocals, guitar, production, art and graphic construction

Other personnel

- Matt Bayles – production, recording, mixing
- Dave Merullo – mastering, audio editing
- Jason Hellmann – video stills
