= Aaron Harris =

American musician and composer (born 1977)

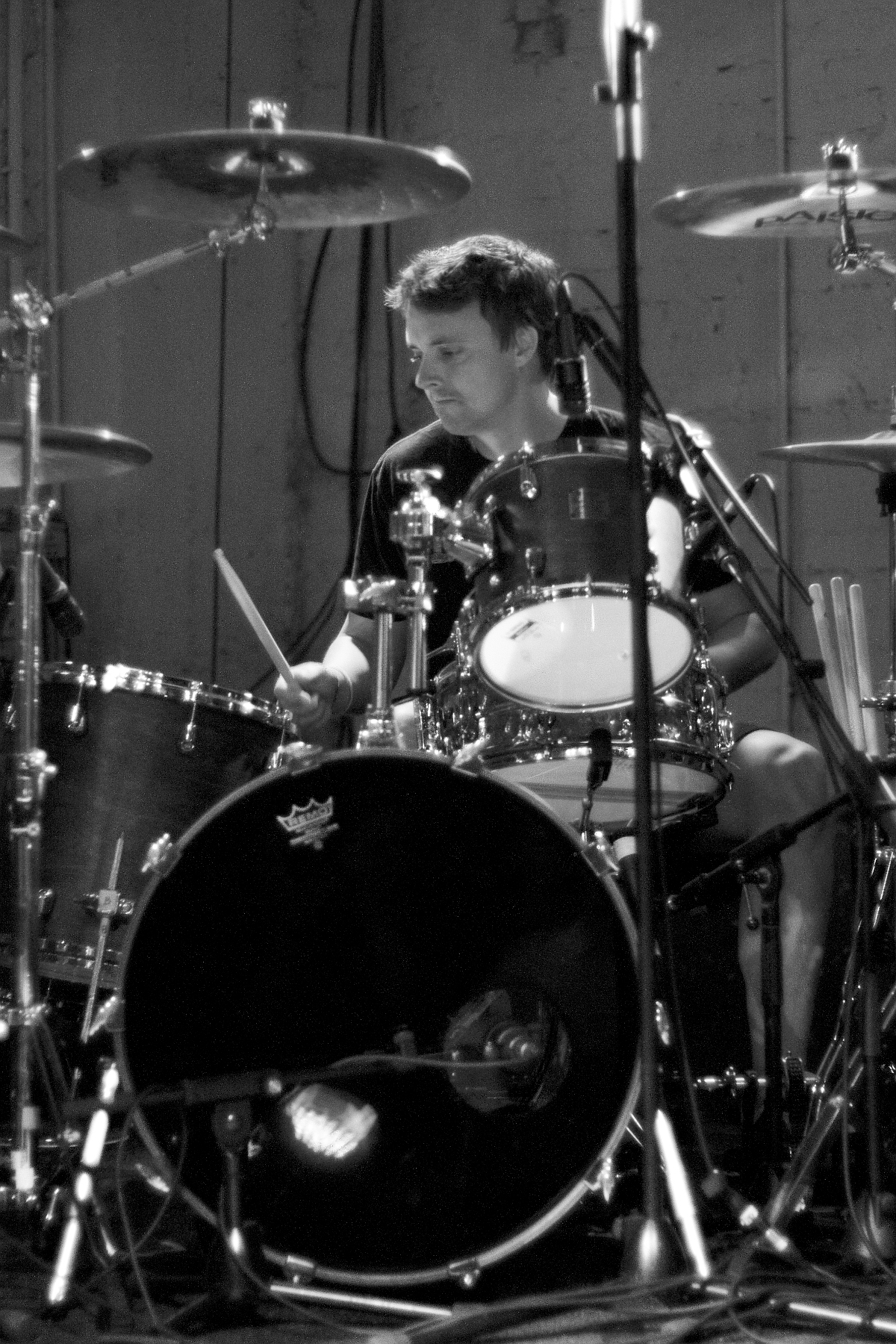
- Harris, drumming for Isis in 2009

Background information
- Born: November 11, 1977 (age 48); Maine, U.S.
- Genres: Post-metal, experimental, post-rock, progressive metal, sludge metal, avant-garde doom
- Occupations: Musician, Producer, drum tech
- Instrument: Drums
- Years active: 1994–present
- Label: Ipecac Recordings
- Website: aaronharris-audio.com

Aaron Harris (born November 11, 1977) is an American musician and composer, best known for his career as the drummer for Los Angeles–based post-metal band Isis. He was with the band from its inception in 1997 to its dissolution in 2010. Since Isis' demise, Harris has become increasingly involved in his career as a composer and producer. His composing work has appeared in projects for A24, Warner Bros., Universal, Disney, Lionsgate, Netflix, NBC, Red Bull and Samsung, among others. As a producer Harris has also worked on records for Palms, Puscifer, Team Sleep, Pelican, Zozobra, Spotlights, Huey, Jakob, The Jezabels and more.

== Life and career ==
His early experience in drumming came from his father, who is also a drummer. Harris would play along to Led Zeppelin, Pink Floyd, Emerson, Lake & Palmer and The Police, and has reached his current level of proficiency without any lessons or formal training. Melvins and Neurosis are also direct influences on his and Isis' sound. He cites Bill Bruford as an influence on his later material, having been introduced to his work through Danny Carey.

Harris's first band was named Loga, which he joined whilst in high school. He was given a cassette of Melvins by the band members and asked to emulate the style of their drummer, Dale Crover, whose work Harris said "changed my life [...] it really shaped me into a whole new drummer."

In October 2006 Harris began endorsing Paiste cymbals. In 2009, Harris also signed an endorsement deal with Sonor drums. He is also sponsored by Evans Drumheads and Vater. Harris is endorsed by Vater drumsticks, and Heil microphones.

In April 2012 it was announced that Harris had joined Chino Moreno of Deftones, along with former bandmates Jeff Caxide and Clifford Meyer, in a side project by the name of Palms. Their first album was originally slated for release in 2012 on Ipecac Records,. It was released on June 25, 2013.

Following his time in Isis and Palms, Harris began composing music for films, television shows and trailers. At Methodic Doubt Music, he has worked on the custom score or sound design for such titles as Jessica Jones, Us, Hereditary and True Detective. In February 2019, Harris released his debut solo album titled Dark Energy through Methodic Doubt. The album is intended to be used in films and trailers and was self-described as a "collection of tracks and sound design ideal for horror, thriller and suspense."

== Discography ==
=== Solo ===
- Dark Energy (2019)

=== With Isis ===
- Mosquito Control (1998)
- Red Sea (1999)
- Sawblade (1999)
- Isis / Pig Destroyer (2000) (Split with Pig Destroyer)
- Celestial (2000)
- SGNL>05 (2001)
- Oceanic (2002)
- Panopticon (2004)
- Oceanic: Remixes & Reinterpretations (2004)
- In the Fishtank 14 (2006) (Split with Aereogramme)
- In the Absence of Truth (2006)
- Wavering Radiant (2009)

=== With Zozobra ===
- Bird of Prey (2008)

=== With Palms ===
- Palms (2013)

== Production and recording discography ==
Year	Artist	Album title	Role
2008	Zozobra	Bird of Prey	Production, engineering and mixing
2011	Lesser Key	Lesser Key	Tracking and mixing
—	Aloke Dutta	Spondaic Oblation	Recording
2011	Crone	Endless Midnight	Mixing
2011	Blood, Sweat and Vinyl: DIY in the 21st Century [film]		Live audio
2017	Spotlights	Seismic	Production and engineering
