= Jeff Caxide =

American bassist

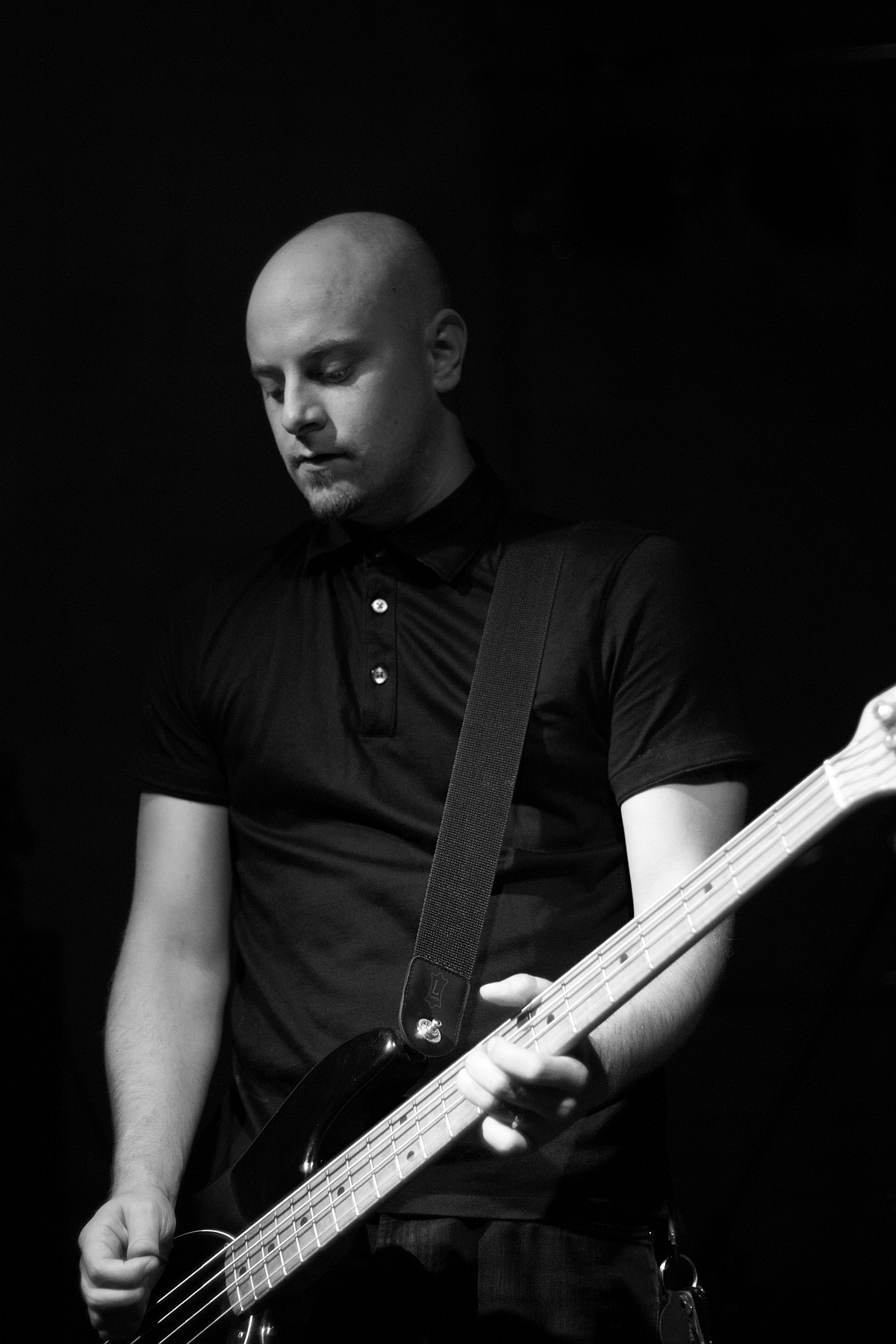
- Caxide playing live with Isis in Stuttgart in 2009

Background information
- Also known as: Crone
- Born: September 13, 1976 (age 50); Connecticut, United States
- Genres: Metalcore; post-metal
- Instruments: Bass; guitar
- Years active: 1994–present
- Labels: Hydra Head; Ipecac
- Member of: Palms
- Formerly of: Cable; House of Low Culture; Isis; Red Sparowes; Spylacopa

Jeff Caxide (born September 13, 1976) is an American bassist, best known for his time with post-metal band Isis, of which he was a founding member and present until its dissolution in 2010. He was also a founding member of Red Sparowes, but left after the release of their first full-length. He also contributed to side-project Spylacopa. Prior to his time in Isis, he was a touring member of the Boston metalcore band 454 Big Block. He also helped found Connecticut-based metalcore band Cable, for whom he played bass. His stay with the band as a musician was brief, but he did return in order to produce 1999's Gutter Queen.

After Isis' dissolution, Caxide went on to create Endless Midnight, an ambient solo album, under the moniker Crone. Mixed by former Isis bandmate Aaron Harris, it was released in 2011 by Waylon Recordings. Brooklyn Vegan made a track, "The Silver Hammer", available for streaming on June 28, 2011 and Noisecreep premiered "What You Dream Of" on July 18.

In April 2012 it was announced that Caxide had joined Chino Moreno of Deftones, along with former bandmates Aaron Harris and Clifford Meyer, in a band by the name of Palms. Their self-titled debut album was released in June 2013.

He lists Pink Floyd, Swans, The Cure and Mogwai as influences.

He plays Music Man Stingray and Sage basses. His effects include: BOSS TU-2, BOSS DD-5, BOSS RV-3, BOSS PS-3, BOSS BF-3, BOSS GEB-7, Fulltone Bass-Drive.

== Discography ==
=== With Isis ===
- Mosquito Control (1998)
- Red Sea (1999)
- Sawblade (1999)
- Isis / Pig Destroyer (2000) (Split with Pig Destroyer)
- Celestial (2000)
- SGNL>05 (2001)
- Oceanic (2002)
- Panopticon (2004)
- Oceanic: Remixes & Reinterpretations (2004)
- In the Fishtank 14 (2006) (with Aereogramme)
- In the Absence of Truth (2006)
- Wavering Radiant (2009)

=== With Red Sparowes ===
- At the Soundless Dawn (2005)

=== With House of Low Culture ===
- Edward's Lament (2003)

=== With Spylacopa ===
- Spylacopa [EP] (2008)

=== As Crone ===
- Endless Midnight (2011)
- Call A Priest/Ice On Wings (2012) Split 7" with Empty Flowers. Crone Remix of Ice On Wings

=== With Palms ===
- Palms (2013)
