= Michael Gallagher (guitarist) =

American guitarist

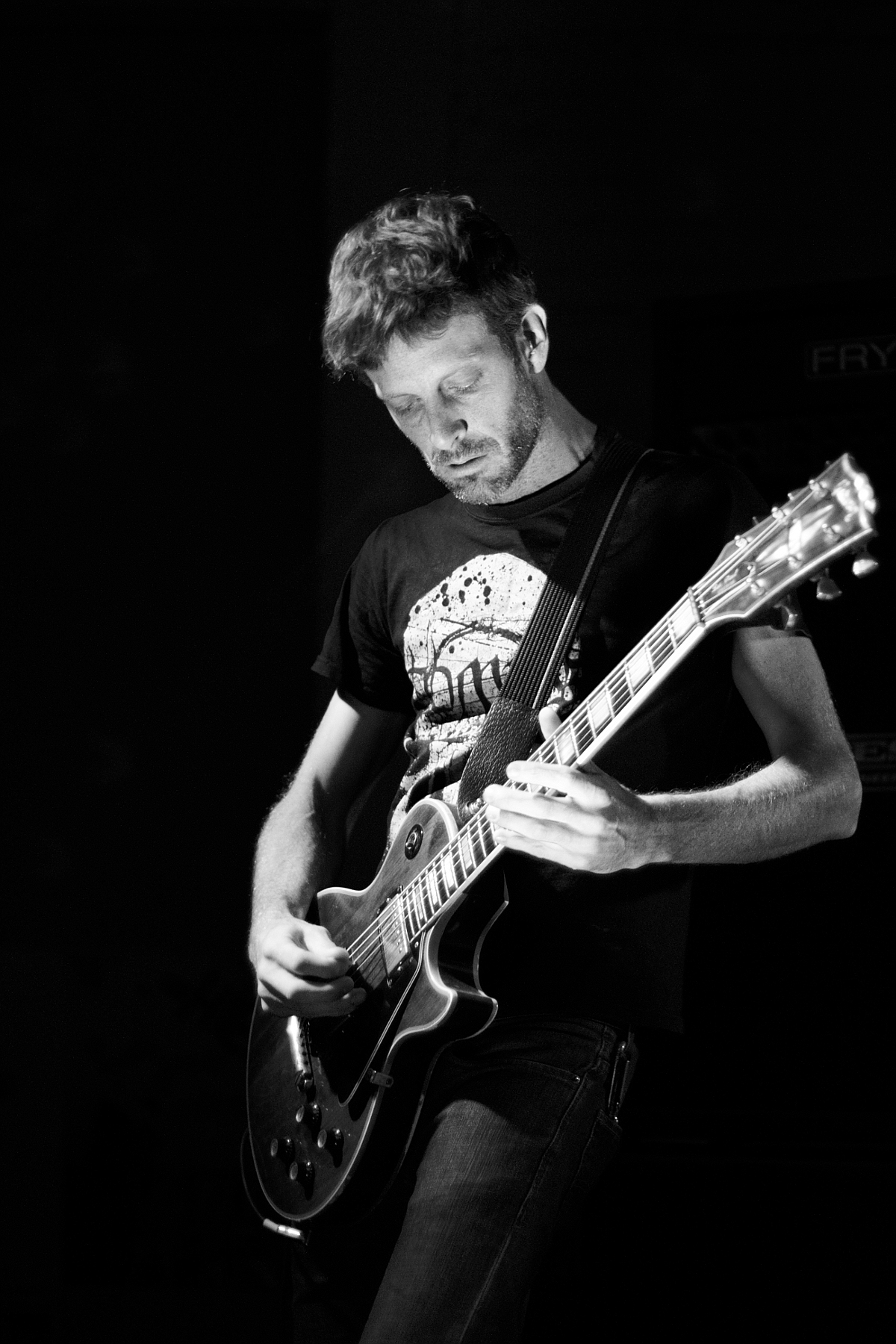

Background information
- Born: Massachusetts, United States
- Genres: Post-metal, experimental, post-rock, progressive metal, sludge metal, avant-garde doom
- Instrument: Guitar
- Years active: 1994 – present
- Labels: Hydra Head Records, Ipecac Recordings

Michael Gallagher is an American guitarist, best known for his work with post-metal band Isis. He joined them in 1999 for their debut LP Celestial, having previously been a member of Cast Iron Hike. He has an ambient project known as MGR (Mustard Gas & Roses); under this moniker he has released two albums and scored one film.

He plays a '78 Les Paul Custom, which he bought on eBay, through a Fryette Sig:x Amplifier. While playing in Isis he normally tuned his guitar down to (B-F#-B-E-G#-B), like his bandmate Aaron Turner.

== Discography ==
=== With Cast Iron Hike ===
- Watch it Burn (1997)
- Cast Iron Hike (1998)

=== With Isis ===
- Sawblade (1999)
- Isis / Pig Destroyer (2000) (Split with Pig Destroyer)
- Celestial (2000)
- SGNL>05 (2001)
- Oceanic (2002)
- Panopticon (2004)
- Oceanic: Remixes & Reinterpretations (2004)
- In the Fishtank 14 (2006) (Split with Aereogramme)
- In the Absence of Truth (2006)
- Wavering Radiant (2009)

=== As MGR ===
- Nova Lux (2006)
- Improptu (2007)
- Wavering on the Cresting Heft (2007)
- 22nd of May [OST] (2010)
- Becoming (2016)
- Glacier's Wake (2024)
