= Bryant Clifford Meyer =

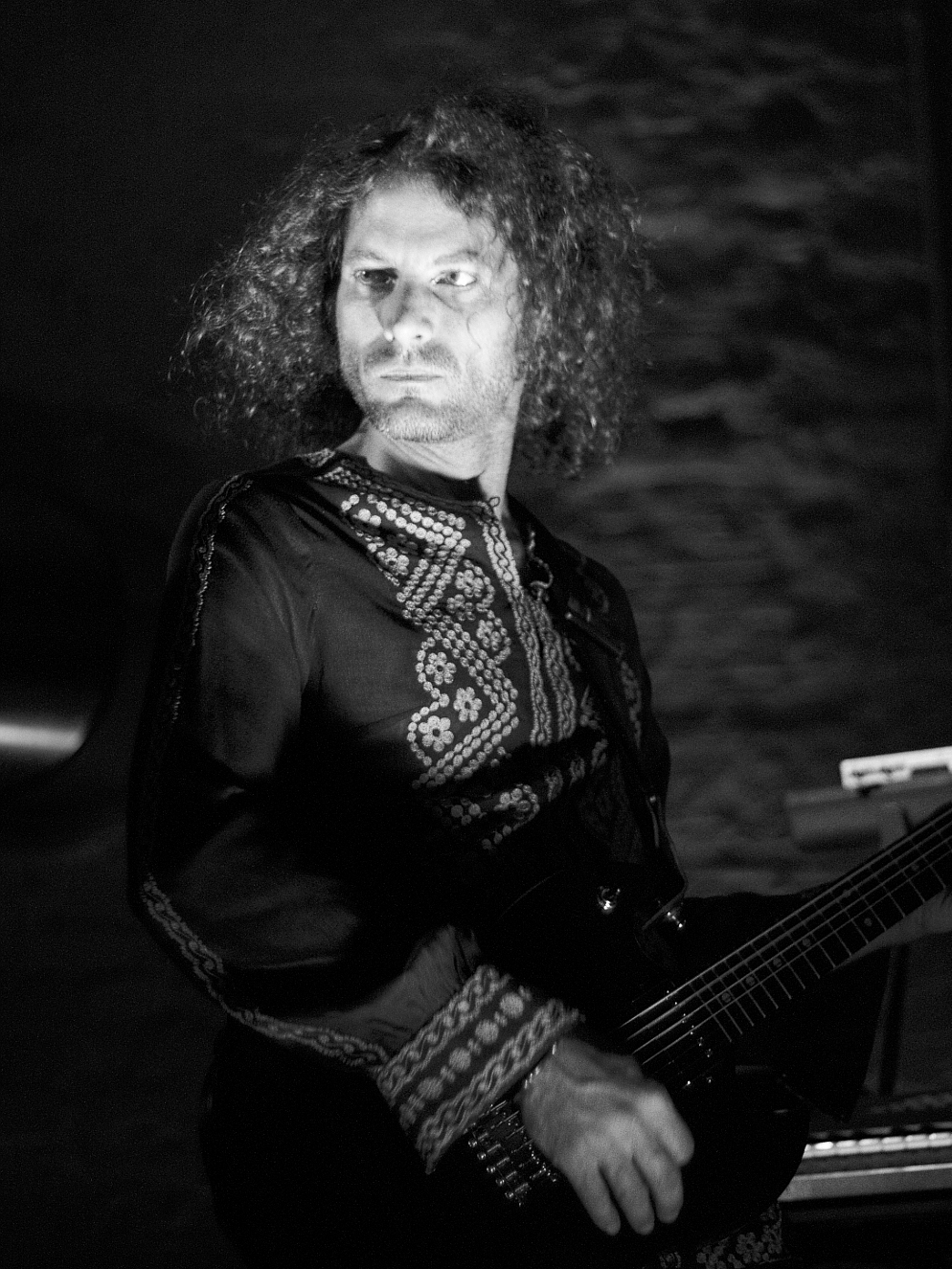
- Meyer in 2009

Background information
- Born: April 10, 1973 (age 53); Cleveland, Ohio, U.S.
- Genres: Extreme metal, experimental, punk rock, alternative rock
- Instruments: Guitar, keyboards
- Years active: 1994–present
- Labels: Hydra Head Records, Ipecac Recordings, Conspiracy Records, Robotic Empire

Bryant Clifford Meyer (sometimes credited as Clifford Meyer, BC Meyer, Cliff Meyer or Bryant C Meyer) is a keyboardist, guitarist and vocalist, (Note: He sings on "Hym", from Oceanic, and "Gentle Time", from Celestial.) best known for his tenure with Los Angeles, California-based post-metal band Isis. He was with the band since its debut full-length, Celestial, in 2000. Previously, he was a formative member of Boston-based rock band The Gersch. He is also a member of post-rock side projects Red Sparowes, Windmills by the Ocean and a solo project named Taiga.

In April 2012 it was announced that Meyer had joined Chino Moreno of Deftones, along with former bandmates Aaron Harris and Jeff Caxide, in a side project by the name of Palms. Their first album was originally slated for release in 2012, but eventually was put out by Ipecac Recordings in 2013.

== Discography ==
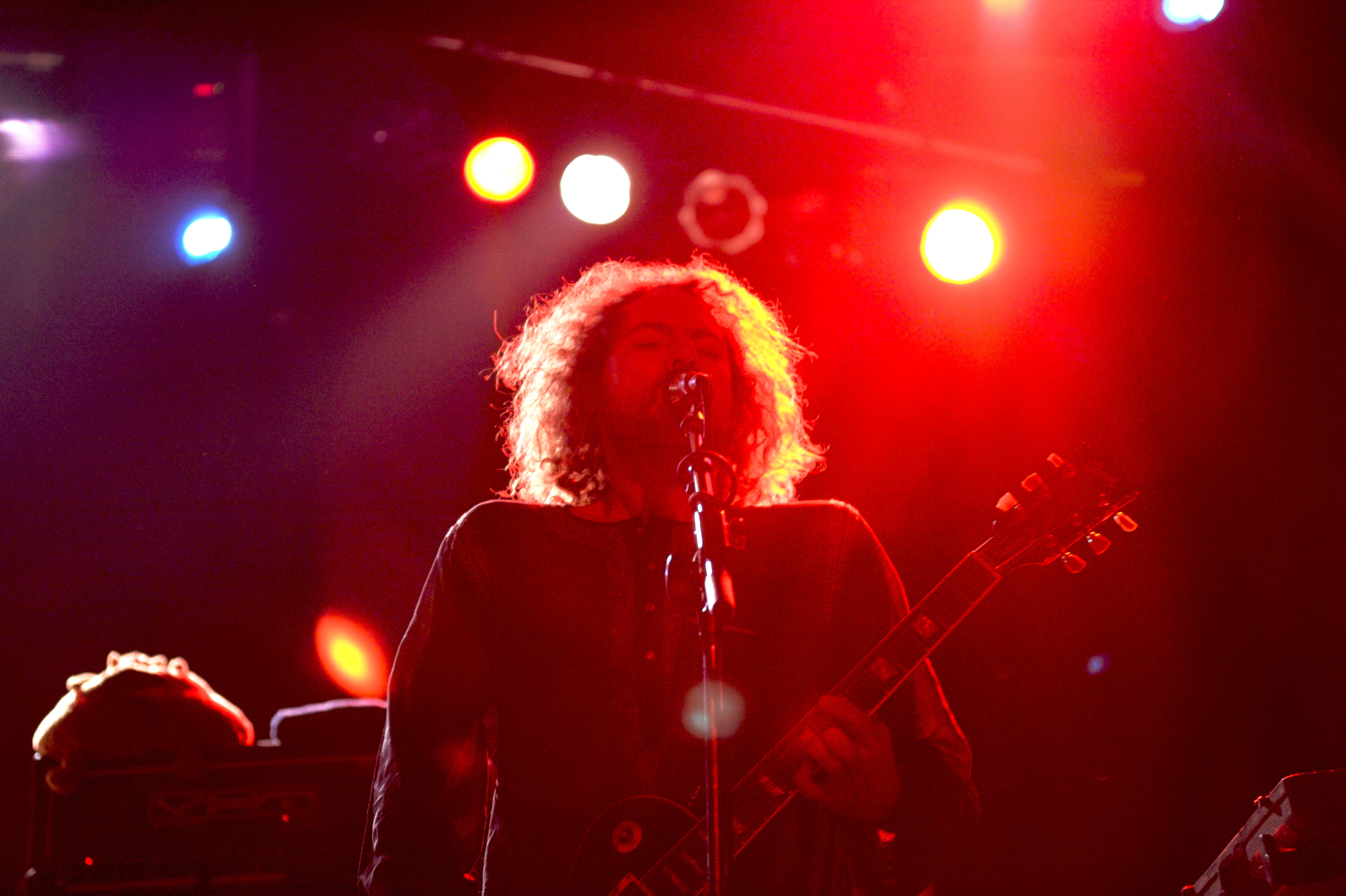
Meyer singing live during a performance of "Gentle Time", from Isis 2000's Celestial.

=== With Isis ===
- Celestial (2000), Escape Artist Records
- SGNL›05 (2001), Neurot Recordings
- Oceanic (2002), Ipecac Recordings
- Panopticon (2004), Ipecac Recordings
- In the Fishtank 14 (2006) (Collaboration with Aereogramme), Konkurrent
- In the Absence of Truth (2006), Ipecac Recordings
- Wavering Radiant (2009), Ipecac Recordings

=== With Red Sparowes ===
- At the Soundless Dawn (2005), Neurot Recordings
- Every Red Heart Shines Toward the Red Sun (2006), Neurot Recordings
- Aphorisms (2008), Sargent House
- The Fear Is Excruciating, but Therein Lies the Answer (2010), Sargent House

=== With The Gersch ===
- Bloodbottom / Listwish (1997), Tortuga Recordings
- The Gersch (2006), Tortuga Recordings
- Live From The Fallout Shelter (2022), Graham F'ing Hick Productions

=== With Windmills by the Ocean ===
- Windmills by the Ocean (2006), Robotic Empire
- Windmills by the Ocean II (2011), Robotic Empire

=== With Taiga ===
- Hsheal (2008), Conspiracy Records
- Flora Chor (2010), Conspiracy Records

=== With Tombs ===
- Path of Totality (2011), Relapse Records (Note: Meyer provided synths for several of the tracks.)

=== With Palms ===
- Palms (2013)

== Notes and references ==
Footnotes

Citations
