= Brian Cook (bassist) =

American bass guitarist (born 1977)

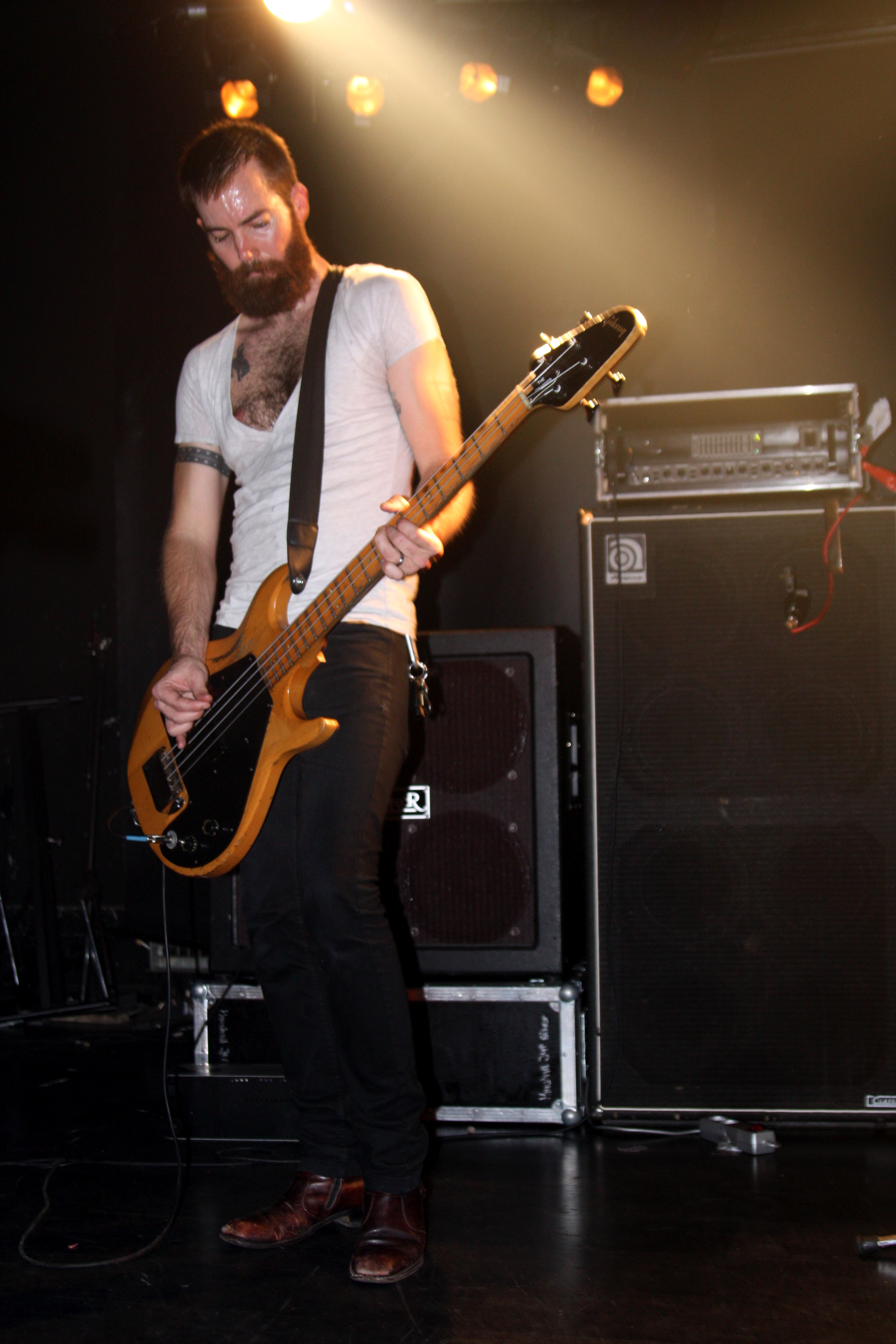

Background information
- Born: July 16, 1977 (age 49)
- Origin: Tacoma, Washington, U.S.
- Genres: Metalcore, mathcore, hardcore punk, post-hardcore, post-rock, post-metal, sludge metal
- Instruments: Bass guitar, guitar, keyboards
- Years active: 1993–present
- Labels: Hydra Head, Suicide Squeeze, Jade Tree, Sargent House
- Member of: Russian Circles, Sumac, Botch, Torment & Glory
- Formerly of: Roy, Onalaska, These Arms Are Snakes
- Spouse: Reno Tripiano

Brian Cook (born July 16, 1977) is an American bassist and musician currently in the bands Botch, Russian Circles and Sumac. He was also previously a full-time member of These Arms Are Snakes and Roy, and also a session musician for Mouth of the Architect. Cook is also a freelance journalist and has published a book titled The Second Chair Is Meant for You. He has also spoken openly about being gay in interviews and personal writings.

In August 2021, Cook released his first solo album titled We Left a Note with an Apology through Sargent House under the moniker Torment & Glory. The initial concept for the album dates back to the mid-2000s when he listened to Bruce Springsteen's 1982 studio album Nebraska on vinyl that was so covered in dust, the music was heavily distorted with occasional acoustic guitar music.

== Discography ==
=== As official member ===
==== Botch ====
- The Unifying Themes of Sex, Death and Religion (compilation) (1997)
- American Nervoso (1998)
- We Are the Romans (1999)
- An Anthology of Dead Ends (EP) (2002)
- 061502 (live album) (2006)

==== Onalaska ====
- To Sing for Nights (2002)

==== Roy ====
- Tacomatose (EP) (2003)
- Big City Sin and Small Town Redemption (2004)
- Killed John Train (2006)

==== These Arms Are Snakes ====
- This Is Meant to Hurt You (EP) (2003)
- Oxeneers or the Lion Sleeps When Its Antelope Go Home (2004)
- Like a Virgin (2005)
- Easter (2006)
- Tail Swallower and Dove (2008)

==== Russian Circles ====
- Station (2008)
- Geneva (2009)
- Empros (2011)
- Memorial (2013)
- Guidance (2016)
- Blood Year (2019)
- Gnosis (2022)
- Nine (2026)

==== Sumac ====
- The Deal (2015)
- What One Becomes (2016)
- American Dollar Bill – Keep Facing Sideways, You're Too Hideous to Look at Face On (2018)
- Love In Shadow (2018)
- Even for Just the Briefest Moment, Keep Charging This 'Expiation" Plug in to........Making it Slightly Better (2019)
- May You Be Held (2020)
- "Two Beasts" (single) (2020)
- Into This Juvenile Apocalypse Our Golden Blood to Pour Let Us Never (2022)
- The Healer (2024)
- The Film (2025)

==== Torment & Glory ====
- We Left a Note with an Apology (2021)

=== As session member ===
==== Mouth of the Architect ====
- The Ties That Blind (2006)

==== Mamiffer ====
- Hirror Enniffer (2008)
- Mare Decendrii (2011)
- Bless Them That Curse You (2012)

==== New Idea Society ====
- "Now is Here" / "Wave Goodbye" (2019)
