= Aaron Turner =

American musician (born 1977)

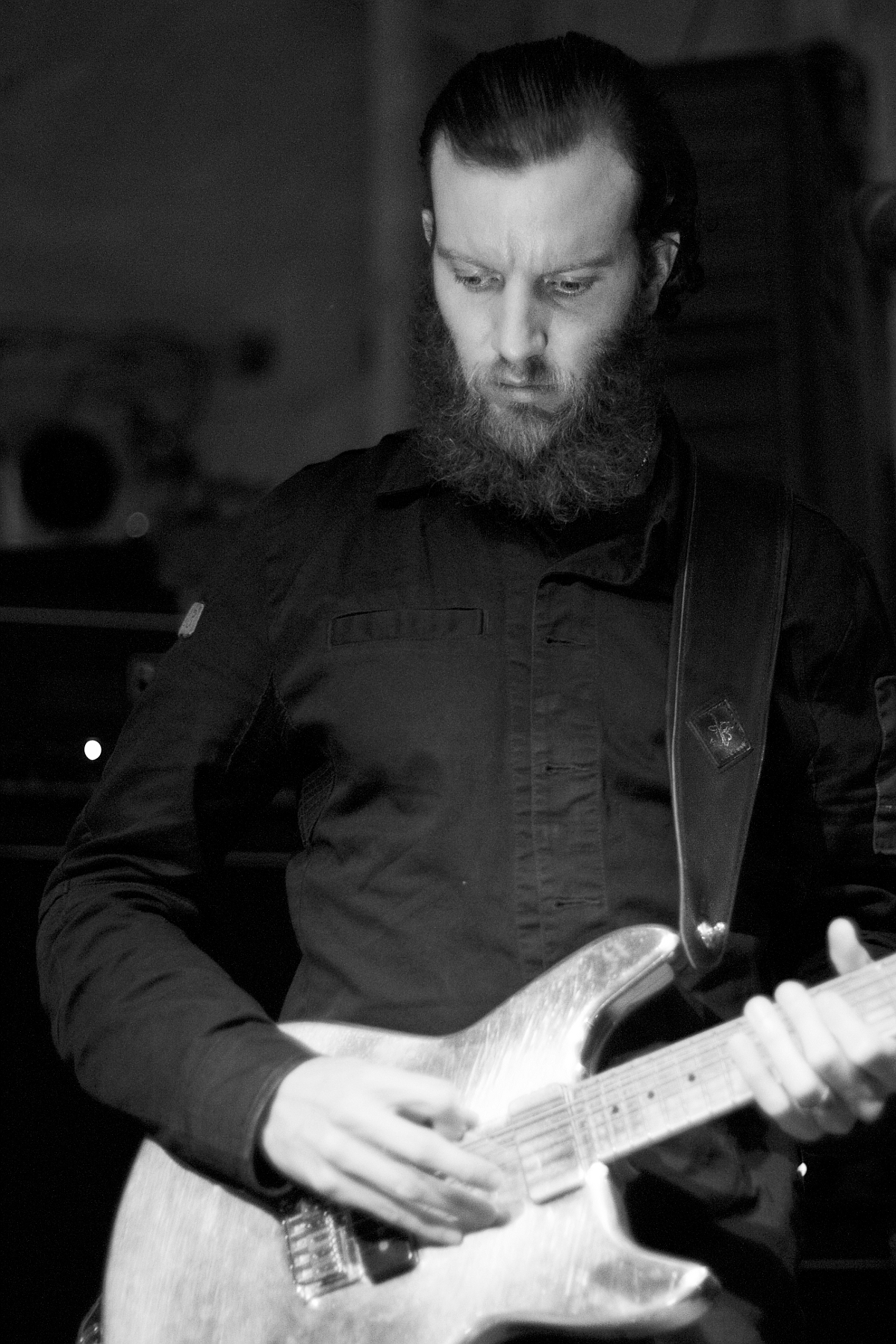
- Turner performing in 2009 with Isis in Stuttgart

Background information
- Born: Aaron Bradford Turner; November 5, 1977 (age 49); Springfield, Massachusetts, US
- Origin: Boston, Massachusetts, US
- Genres: Extreme metal, experimental, post-metal, avant-garde metal, ambient
- Instruments: Vocals, guitar
- Years active: 1995–present
- Labels: Hydra Head, Ipecac, Neurot, SIGE
- Member of: Neurosis, Sumac, Old Man Gloom, Mamiffer, Split Cranium, Greymachine, Jodis, House of Low Culture, Lotus Eaters
- Formerly of: Isis, Twilight, Unionsuit
- Website: AaronBTurner.blogspot.com

Aaron Turner (born November 5, 1977) is an American musician, singer, graphic artist, and founder of label Hydra Head Records. He is known for being the vocalist and guitarist for the post-metal band Isis from 1997 to 2010. In 2014, he formed the band Sumac. Turner joined the post-metal band Neurosis in 2024.

He has also participated in several other bands and projects such as Old Man Gloom, Lotus Eaters, Greymachine and Split Cranium, a collaboration with Jussi Lehtisalo of Finnish band Circle who toured with Isis in 2009.

Raised in New Mexico, Turner moved to the Boston area, where he attended art school and formed Isis and Hydra Head. In June 2003, Turner moved operations of both the band and label to Los Angeles, California. Turner now resides in Vashon, Washington, which is also the base of operations for Hydra Head and his various other activities.

In partnership with his wife Faith Coloccia, Turner founded another record label, SIGE, in March 2011. It has gone on to release material from his musical collaboration with Coloccia, Mamiffer. SIGE is distributed by The Business.

== Early life ==
Turner was born in Springfield, Massachusetts on November 5, 1977. At an early age, his family moved to New Mexico, where he was raised. His mother was a teacher "who taught a progressive curriculum" and his father an author, "mainly [of] non-fiction". Turner describes his upbringing, surrounded by his parents' writer, artist and photographer friends, as "creatively nurturing". At age 17, he started a company that sold rare punk rock records via mail-order. He later moved to Boston to attend art school at the School of the Museum of Fine Arts, and in 1995 began releasing music. By 1997, the Hydra Head label was becoming a respectable small record label. Turner describes his early industriousness as being motivated in part by boredom:

I grew up in New Mexico, and there wasn't a whole lot as far as youth culture is concerned. Especially when I started to get interested in straight edge and wasn't doing drugs anymore, there was really nothing for me to do. So that was like a big reason for me, I suppose, to become really productive. Also, I've never been a really social person. So there's not a lot of time taken up by my social life. And music has always been a very very big part of my life. I guess just a combination of those factors is why everything got started so early.

Around 1997–99, Turner was living with future Isis bassist and co-founder Jeff Caxide; until this point, he had been a member of the bands Union Suit and Hollomen. Isis was formed in 1997 out of a dissatisfaction with said bands' musical direction and Turner and Caxide's respective degrees of creative control.

== Equipment ==
Touring with Isis in 2007, Turner used two different guitars: a 1976 Fender Telecaster Custom (black), and a 1975 Fender Telecaster Deluxe (brown), played through various effects (his pedalboard layout changed every gig depending on what songs the band decided to play that night), a VHT/Fryette Pitbull Ultra Lead, and two 4x12 Sunn cabinets. He has also acquired a custom guitar from the Electrical Guitar Company (as did fellow Isis guitarist Michael Gallagher).

In the past, Turner has also used a Gibson Les Paul Standard, PRS CE24, and has played through Sunn, Mesa Boogie, and Mackie amplifiers.

When playing with Isis, Turner and his fellow guitarists usually tuned their instruments (low to high) B-F#-B-E-G#-B, to achieve a heavier sound. They also used other tunings, though less frequently, such as F# (octave below)-F#-B-E-G#-B.

In 2016, Turner described the live rig he used with SUMAC as consisting of two custom-built guitars from the Electrical Guitar Company. Both have lucite bodies and aluminum necks, and custom-wound wide frequency range pickups. The newer of the two—a prototype for a signature model—has a slightly flatter fingerboard radius than the older instrument. On a tour of the Eastern US, Turner was using an Orange Dual Dark 100 amplifier head with a slaved Fryette Two/Ninety/Two power amp. Both heads drove Orange and Marshall cabinets, though Turner claimed to have no strong preferences for particular speaker cabinets. While recording, Turner prefers to use a Fryette Pitbull Ultra Lead, an amp model he's used consistently since his work in Isis. Turner described using a variety of effects pedals in his live rig. Specifically, he runs a BOSS TU-3 Chromatic Tuner, a Death By Audio Apocalypse fuzz, a MASF fuzz, a Strymon BlueSky reverb (which he described as the one essential pedal in his rig), a TC Electronics Ditto Looper X2, and an EHX Forty-Five Thousand sampler (used to trigger preset samples during performance). Turner prefers a Heil PR20 vocal microphone. When playing with Sumac he uses two distinct tunings being A-F#-B-D-F#-B and A#-F-A#-D-F#-A#.

== Musical influences ==
Turner cites Pink Floyd, King Crimson, Godflesh, Neurosis, and Led Zeppelin as influences on Isis' sound. However, he points to the electronica, krautrock and hip hop genres as shaping the group's rhythmic focus and use of sampling, as well as their occasional digressions into ambient passages. He has also listed Melvins, Jimi Hendrix, Swans, Keiji Haino, Oxbow, Earth, and Coil as among his favorite artists, and has noted that Megadeth, Metallica, and Slayer were important to his early interests in the guitar. In addition, he has noted Black Sabbath as an influence during his formative years.

== Personal life ==
In mid-2009, Turner moved from Los Angeles – where both Isis and Hydra Head Records were based at the time – to Seattle with his then-girlfriend, Faith Coloccia. They wed in September of the same year.

Turner is also a graphic designer and a tattoo artist who works at the Dark Age Tattoo shop in Seattle.

== Discography ==
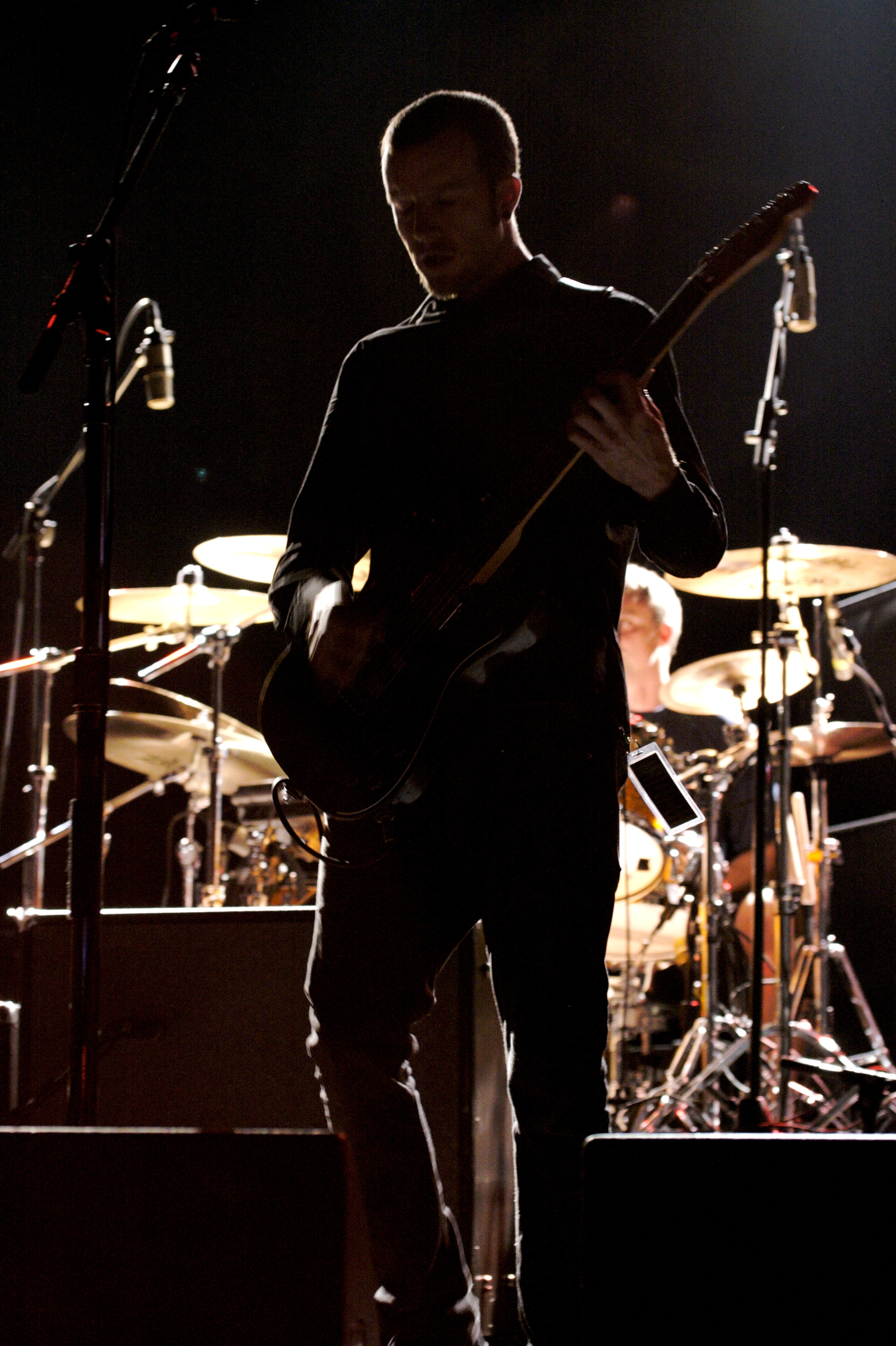
Turner performing with Isis in Colchester, UK in 2004.

=== Solo ===
- Interminable Conniption (2019), The Tapeworm / Sige
- Repression's Blossom (2019), Sige
- The Occupation of Selfishness (Single) (2021)
- To Speak (2022), Trost

=== With Daniel Menche ===
- NOX (2017), Sige

=== With Doolhof ===
- Doolhof (2020), Sige

=== With Drawing Voices ===
- Drawing Voices (2007), Hydra Head Records

=== With Greymachine ===
- "Vultures Descend" (2009), Hydra Head Records
- Disconnected (2009), Hydra Head Records

=== With Hollomen ===
- "Brand New Genius" [single] (1997), Hydra Head Records

=== With House of Low Culture ===
- Submarine Immersion Techniques Vol. 1 (2000), Activities
- Gettin' Sentimental EP (2002), Robotic Empire
- Edward's Lament (2003), Neurot Recordings
- Live from the House of Low Temperature! EP (2004), Hydra Head Records
- Chinatown Squalls EP (2007), En/Of
- Housing Tracts Compilation (2010), Sige
- Uncrossing / Ice Mole Split EP with Mamiffer (2010), Utech Records
- Lou Lou... In Tokyo Split with Mamiffer and Merzbow (2011), Sige
- Cloey / Spoiled Fruits of the Kingdom (Demo) Split EP with Mamiffer (2011), Sige
- Perverted Scripture / Silent Night Split EP with Mamiffer (2011), Sige
- Poisoned Soil (2011), Taiga Records/Sub Rosa
- Mamiffer + HOLC Split EP with Mamiffer (2013), Sige
- House of Low Culture / Caustic Touch / Daniel Menche / EMS Split (2017), Accident Prone
- Irretrievable (2020), Sige

=== With Isis ===
- Mosquito Control (1998), Escape Artist Records
- The Red Sea (1999), Second Nature Recordings
- Sawblade (1999), Tortuga Recordings
- Isis / Pig Destroyer (2000) (Split with Pig Destroyer), Relapse Records
- Celestial (2000), Escape Artist Records
- SGNL>05 (2001), Neurot Recordings
- Oceanic (2002), Ipecac Recordings
- Panopticon (2004), Ipecac Recordings
- In the Fishtank 14 (2006) collaboration with Aereogramme, Konkurrent
- In the Absence of Truth (2006), Ipecac Recordings
- Wavering Radiant (2009), Ipecac Recordings
- Melvins / Isis (2010) (Split with Melvins), Hydra Head Records

=== With Jodis ===
- Secret House (2009), Hydra Head Records
- Black Curtain (2012), Hydra Head Records

=== With Jon Mueller ===
- In the Falls (2021), Sige
- Now That You've Found It (2022), American Dreams Records

=== With Lotus Eaters ===
- Alienist on a Pale Horse [EP] (2001), Double H Noise Industries
- Mind Control for Infants (2002), Neurot Recordings
- Lotus Eaters [EP] (2002), Drone Records
- Wurmwulv (2007), Troubleman Unlimited Records

=== With Mamiffer ===
- Hirror Enniffer (2008), Hydra Head Records
- Uncrossing / Ice Mole Split EP with House of Low Culture (2010), Utech Records
- Iron Road II / Fake Witch Split 12" with Oakeater (2011), Sige
- Lou Lou... In Tokyo Split with House of Low Culture and Merzbow (2011), Sige
- Perverted Scripture / Silent Night Split EP with House of Low Culture (2011), Sige
- Mare Decendrii (2011), Sige
- Bless Them That Curse You Collaboration LP with Locrian (2011), Sige
- Mamiffer / Pyramids Split LP with Pyramids (2012), Hydra Head Records
- Enharmonic Intervals (for Paschen organ) Collaboration LP with Circle (2013), Sige
- Statu Nascendi (2014), Sige
- Crater Collaboration LP with Daniel Menche (2015), Sige
- The World Unseen (2016), Sige
- Recordings For Lilac III limited cassette (2017), The Tapeworm
- The Brilliant Tabernacle (2019), Sige
- Ae/Be EP, (2020), Sige
- Mettapatterning for Constellation, (2020), Sige

=== With Marshall Trammell ===
- Experimental Love I & II (2020), Sige

=== With Neurosis ===
- An Undying Love for a Burning World (2026), Neurot Recordings

=== With Old Man Gloom ===
- Meditations in B (1999), Tortuga Recordings
- Seminar II: The Holy Rites of Primitivism Regressionism (2001), Tortuga Recordings
- Seminar III: Zozobra (2001), Tortuga Recordings
- Christmas Eve I and II + 6 [EP] (2003), Tortuga Recordings
- Christmas (2004), Tortuga Recordings
- No (2012), Hydra Head Records
- The Ape of God (2014), Profound Lore
- Mickey Rookey Live at London (2016), Ektro Records
- Seminar IX: Darkness of Being (2020), Profound Lore
- Seminar VIII: Light of Meaning (2020), Profound Lore
- Willing Vessel / Storms in our Eyes [EP] (2020), Sige

=== With Pharaoh Overlord ===
- 6 (2020), Rocket Recordings
- Louhi (2025), Rocket Recordings

=== With Split Cranium ===
- Sceptres To Rust 7-inch (2012), Self Released
- Split Cranium (2012), Hydra Head
- I'm the Devil and I'm OK (2018), Ipecac Recordings

=== With Sumac ===
- The Deal (2015), Profound Lore
- What One Becomes (2016), Thrill Jockey
- Before You I Appear EP (2016), Thrill Jockey
- American Dollar Bill – Keep Facing Sideways, You're Too Hideous to Look at Face On with Keiji Haino (2018), Thrill Jockey
- Love in Shadow (2018), Thrill Jockey
- Even for Just the Briefest Moment Keep Charging This "Expiation" Plug in to Making It Slightly Better with Keiji Haino (2019), Trost
- May You Be Held (2020), Thrill Jockey
- Into This Juvenile Apocalypse Our Golden Blood to Pour Let Us Never with Keiji Haino (2022), Thrill Jockey
- The Healer (2024)
- The Film with Moor Mother (2025), Thrill Jockey

=== With Summer of Seventeen ===
- Summer of Seventeen (2020, Karlrecords)

=== With Tashi Dorji ===
- Turn!Turn!Turn (2019), Sige

=== With Thalassa ===
- Bonds of Prosperity (2017), Sige

=== With Twilight ===
- Monument to Time End (2010), Southern Lord Records

=== With Unionsuit ===
- Demo tape (1996), Hydra Head Records
- Accidents Happened [EP] (1997), Second Nature Recordings

=== As a guest contributor ===
- 27 – Let the Light in (2004), Hydra Head Records
  - Turner contributes vocals to the track "April".
- Boris – Heavy Rocks (2011), Sargent House
  - Turner contributes to the track "Aileron".
- Chelsea Wolfe – Hiss Spun (2017), Sargent House
  - Guest vocals on the track "Vex"
- Converge – Converge / Napalm Death, self-released
  - Guest on "Wolverine Blues" (originally performed by Entombed).
- Dekathlon – The Thin Road 7″ (2019), Ektro Records
  - Guest vocals and guitar
- Full of Hell – Trumpeting Ecstasy (2017), Profound Lore Records
  - Guest vocals on "Crawling Back To God"
- Lustmord – O T H E R (2008), Hydra Head Records
  - Turner contributes guitar to the track "Element".
- Pelican – What We All Come to Need (2009), Southern Lord Records
  - Turner contributes guest guitar to the title track.
- Puscifer – "V" Is for Viagra. The Remixes (2008), Puscifer Entertainment
  - Turner provides the track "Trekka (The Great Unwashed Mix)".
- Samuel Kerridge – The I is Nothing (2018), Downwards Records
  - guest on "Propagates of Desire".
- Ringfinger – Decimal (2007), Little Black Cloud Records
  - Turner contributes vocals and guitar to the track "Waving Good-Bye".
- Wolves in the Throne Room – Turner provides chants on "Subterranean Initiation" (2011)

== Artwork ==
Turner's artwork tends toward the abstract or surreal, often depicting strange or fantastic landscapes and structures. His work on album covers, concert posters, and other music-related graphics is distinct from typical work in heavy metal or rock graphic design. In part, this may be because of the way that Turner views his objectives in creating designs, which he has discussed on his blog in response to criticism of the clarity of text on one of his concert posters:

I also generally reject the idea that posters and album sleeves and T-shirts have to be marketing tools with overly obvious type/graphics, as opposed to more artistically oriented pieces that invoke the true spirit of the music they are intended to represent. if the bands being represented aren't writing 3 minute pop songs with inane choruses that beat the listener into submission, why should the representative graphics serve that purpose? i like to think the audience that follows these bands isn't the type of audience that requires overly simplified/commercial imagery and type in order to draw their attention to the "product". it is precisely the type of corporate design mentality as exemplified by the statement above that i have striven to avoid with what i do in the realm of music related graphics. we're not trying to sell our music to wal-mart shoppers, so if you expect our graphic personality to fall in line with what you were taught in design school about corporate branding and "truly effective" type and illustration techniques you shall be continually disappointed. clean type has its time and place, but this poster which is meant to showcase the personality of our label and by extension the show itself isn't it. music related design can be art simply beyond the idea of selling something...

In 2008, Turner's artwork was featured in a FIFTY24SF Gallery group show entitled Catalyst. Turner has created album covers and liner note artwork for a variety of artists and bands, many of whom are signed to Hydra Head Records or Tortuga Recordings.

- 27 – Let the Light In
- 5ive – 5ive, Telestic Disfracture
- Aereogramme – Seclusion
- Agoraphobic Nosebleed – PCP Torpedo, Frozen Corpse Stuffed with Dope
- A Life Once Lost – The Fourth Plague: Flies
- Beecher – Breaking the Fourth Wall
- Bloodlet – Entheogen
- Burst – Prey on Life
- Cable – Northern Failures
- Cave In – Antenna, Planets of Old, Jupiter, White Silence
- Cavity – Laid Insignificant
- Clouds – We Are Above You
- Coalesce – There is Nothing New Under the Sun
- Converge – Petitioning the Empty Sky, (Note: Turner provided two separate pieces of album art; for both the original 1996 release and the 2005 remaster.) When Forever Comes Crashing
- Craw – Bodies for Strontium 90
- The Dillinger Escape Plan – The Dillinger Escape Plan
- Drowningman – Drowningman Still Loves You
- The Dukes of Nothing – War & Wine
- Eugene Robinson – Fight
- Hematovore – Untitled
- The Hollomen – The Hollomen
- The Hope conspiracy – demo
- Isis – Mosquito Control, The Red Sea, Sawblade, Celestial, SGNL>05, Oceanic, Live.01, Panopticon, Live.02, Oceanic Remixes and Reinterpretations, Live.03, Live.04, Clearing the Eye, In the Absence of Truth, Shades of the Swarm, "Not in Rivers, but in Drops", Wavering Radiant, Isis / Melvins
- James Plotkin's Atomsmasher – Atomsmasher
- Jesu – Silver, Lifeline, Conqueror, Jesu, Why Are We Not Perfect?
- Jodis – Secret House
- Johnny Truant – The Repercussions of a Badly Planned Suicide
- KEN mode – Mongrel
- Kid Kilowatt – Guitar Method
- Knut – Terraformer, Wonder
- Mare – Self-Titled EP
- Milligram – Hello Motherfucker
- Mistle Thrush – Drunk with You
- Neurosis – Sovereign, Neurosis & Jarboe (remastered), An Undying Love for a Burning World
- Old Man Gloom – Meditations in B, Seminar II: The Holy Rites of Primitivism Regressionism, NO
- Panic – Dying For It
- Pelican – Australasia, The Fire in Our Throats Will Beckon the Thaw, City of Echoes
- Premonitions of War – Left in Kowloon
- Rosetta – The Galilean Satellites
- Torche – Meanderthal
- Tusk – Get Ready
- Xasthur – All Reflections Drained
- Zozobra – Harmonic Tremors, Bird of Prey
