= Bless Them That Curse You =

Studio album by Mamiffer + Locrian
- Released: March 6, 2012
- Studio: Electrical Audio, Studio Greg (both Chicago), House of Low Culture (Vashon, Washington) and AVAST! Studios (overdubs; Seattle)
- Genre: Avant-garde, experimental rock, art rock, drone metal
- Length: 51:36
- Language: English
- Label: Profound Lore Records, SIGE, Utech Records, Land of Decay
- Producer: Randall Dunn, Mamiffer and Locrian

Locrian chronology
The Clearing (2011)	Bless Them That Curse You (2012)	Locrian & Christoph Heemann (2012)

Mamiffer chronology
Mare Decendrii (2011)	Bless Them That Curse You (2012)	Statu Nascendi (2014)

Bless Them That Curse You is a collaborative album between Locrian and Mamiffer. The first single off the album, "In Fulminic Blaze", was released digitally on January 5, 2012.

== Background ==
In an interview with Invisible Oranges, André Foisy stated that Mamiffer’s Aaron Turner invited Locrian to play shows and collaborate after the Utech Records festival in June 2012. The groups found support for the collaborative project from the Canadian Profound Lore record label.

In the same interview, Locrian’s Steven Hess stated that “Profound Lore was nice enough to advance us the money and pay for the recording sessions. Then everything went perfectly – the timing for everyone to come here, the festival” and the shows that the groups played together afterwards in the U.S. and Canada.

Regarding the recording session and the planning for the album, Mamiffer’s Faith Coloccia, in an interview with NPR, stated that “Everything came together, in a kind of synchronicity kind of way. We found connections between seemingly disparate sounds and images, and unified them into harmonious relationships.”

== Reception ==
Upon its release, the album was met with generally favorable reviews. Eduardo Rivadavia of AllMusic described the collaboration as “powerful and seductive” and that “no song is safe from experiencing unexpected mutations or harboring antithetical sounds in both sublimely harmonious and intentionally disharmonic ways.” Alan Ranta of Exclaim described the album as a mix of tracks that “push towards the experimental side," and others that "drive towards post-rock and black metal.” PopMatters awarded the album an 8 out of 10 stars and described the album as having a “deeply meditative pulse” combining the “metallic drones, tender piano compositions, chorale vocals” of Mamiffer with Locrian’s mixture of “black metal, noise, drone, Krautrock, ambient and proto-electronica.” Creaig Dunton of Brainwashed described Bless Them That Curse You as “a dark, yet captivating set of tracks” which incorporate “bits of drone, black metal, post-rock, and gentle piano passages.”

Professional ratings
Review scores
Source	Rating
PopMatters	8/10
Tiny Mix Tapes	4.5/5
AllMusic	4/5
Spin	7/10
Brainwashed	favorable

== Track listing ==
No.	Title	Writer(s)	Length
1.	"In Fulminic Blaze"	Terence Hannum	9:02
2.	"Bless Them That Curse You"		6:03
3.	"Corpus Luteum"		5:54
4.	"Second Burial"		6:00
5.	"Lechatelierite"		5:40
6.	"Metis/Amaranthine/The Emperor"	Faith Coloccia (Metis), Terrence Hannum (Amaranthine), Aaron Turner (The Emperor)	18:59

== Personnel ==
Credits adapted from AllMusic.

Locrian

- André Foisy – acoustic guitar, electric guitar
- Terence Hannum – synthesizer, vocals, effects, Mellotron
- Steven Hess – drums, timpani, tape effects

Mammiffer

- Faith Coloccia – piano, vocals, tack piano, bass synth, tape samples
- Aaron Turner – electric guitar, vocals
- Alex Barnett – Mellotron, tack piano, synthesizer
- Brian Cook – bass
- Travis Rommereim – percussion

Production

- Randall Dunn – producer, overdub recording, mixing
- Greg Norman – recording engineer, horns on "Fulminic Blaze"
- Aaron Turner – additional recording
- Jason Ward – mastering
- Faith Coloccia – photography, art and design
