= The Healer (Sumac album) =

Studio album by Sumac
- Released: June 21, 2024
- Recorded: May–June 2023
- Studios: Studio Litho (Seattle, WA); HoLC (Vashon, WA)
- Genre: Avant-garde metal
- Length: 76:08
- Label: Thrill Jockey
- Producer: Scott Evans

Sumac chronology
Into This Juvenile Apocalypse Our Golden Blood to Pour Let Us Never (2022)	The Healer (2024)	The Film (2025)

The Healer is the fifth studio album by the American/Canadian metal band Sumac. The album was released on June 21, 2024, through Thrill Jockey.

== Music and lyrics ==
In a press release for the album, the band stated the four songs on The Healer, "embody the depth of the human experience, seeking to mirror humanity's endurance of 'mortal and spiritual challenges,' that grant greater capacity for understanding, empathy, and love on the other side." Sumac sees The Healer as the conclusion of an unofficial trilogy that started with Love in Shadow (2018) and continued with May You Be Held (2020).

== Promotion ==
Sumac promoted The Healer with an online stream of "Yellow Dawn" coinciding with the album's announcement in April 2024. In May 2024, director Damien Neva in collaboration with Roadburn Festival released a documentary titled Six Hours 42 Minutes with Sumac.

To support The Healer, Sumac will tour North America in June and July 2024 starting with a set at the Vancouver International Jazz Festival.

Sumac will follow up The Healer with a two-song remix EP titled The Keeper's Tongue in July 2024. The EP includes a remix of "World of Light" by Moor Mother, and a remix of "The Stone's Turn" by Raven Chacon.

== Reception ==
Professional ratings
Review scores
Source	Rating
AllMusic	3.5/5 stars
Pitchfork	8.4/10
PopMatters	9/10

The Healer was generally well received by music critics. Pitchfork gave the album an 8.4/10.0 rating, and awarded the album the title of "Best New Music". Patric Fallon of Pitchfork praised the album within Sumac's discography, stating: "If Love in Shadow searched ever more deeply for metal's untapped possibilities and May You Be Held confidently wrestled with its roiling unknown, then The Healer swallows its universe whole and reforms it anew. It's an album that uses the rejection of metal's well-trodden forms not as an endpoint but as a catalyst for bringing something else into being." Writing for PopMatters, Seth Troyer drew similar comparisons to the bands catalog, stating: "It feels like the culmination of a sort of trilogy for Sumac that began with 2018's Love In Shadow and continued with the equally stunning May You Be Held in 2020. [...] The results are overwhelming. You won't believe your ears." Writing for AllMusic, Paul Simpson said: "The Healer is an emotionally draining experience, like all of Sumac's other releases, but it reaches transcendence in a unique and powerful way."

== Track listing ==
All tracks are written by Sumac.

No.	Title	Length
1.	"World of Light"	25:53
2.	"Yellow Dawn"	12:49
3.	"New Rites"	12:51
4.	"The Stone's Turn"	24:35
Total length:		76:08

== Personnel ==
The Healer personnel adapted from vinyl liner notes.

Sumac

- Aaron Turner – guitar, vocals
- Nick Yacyshyn – drums, percussion
- Brian Cook – bass

Additional musicians

- Faith Coloccia – tapes on "World of Light" and organ on "Yellow Dawn"

Recording and production

- Scott Evans – engineering, mixing
- Aaron Turner – additional recording, art and design
- Matthew Barnhart – mastering
