= Faith Coloccia =

American artist and musician

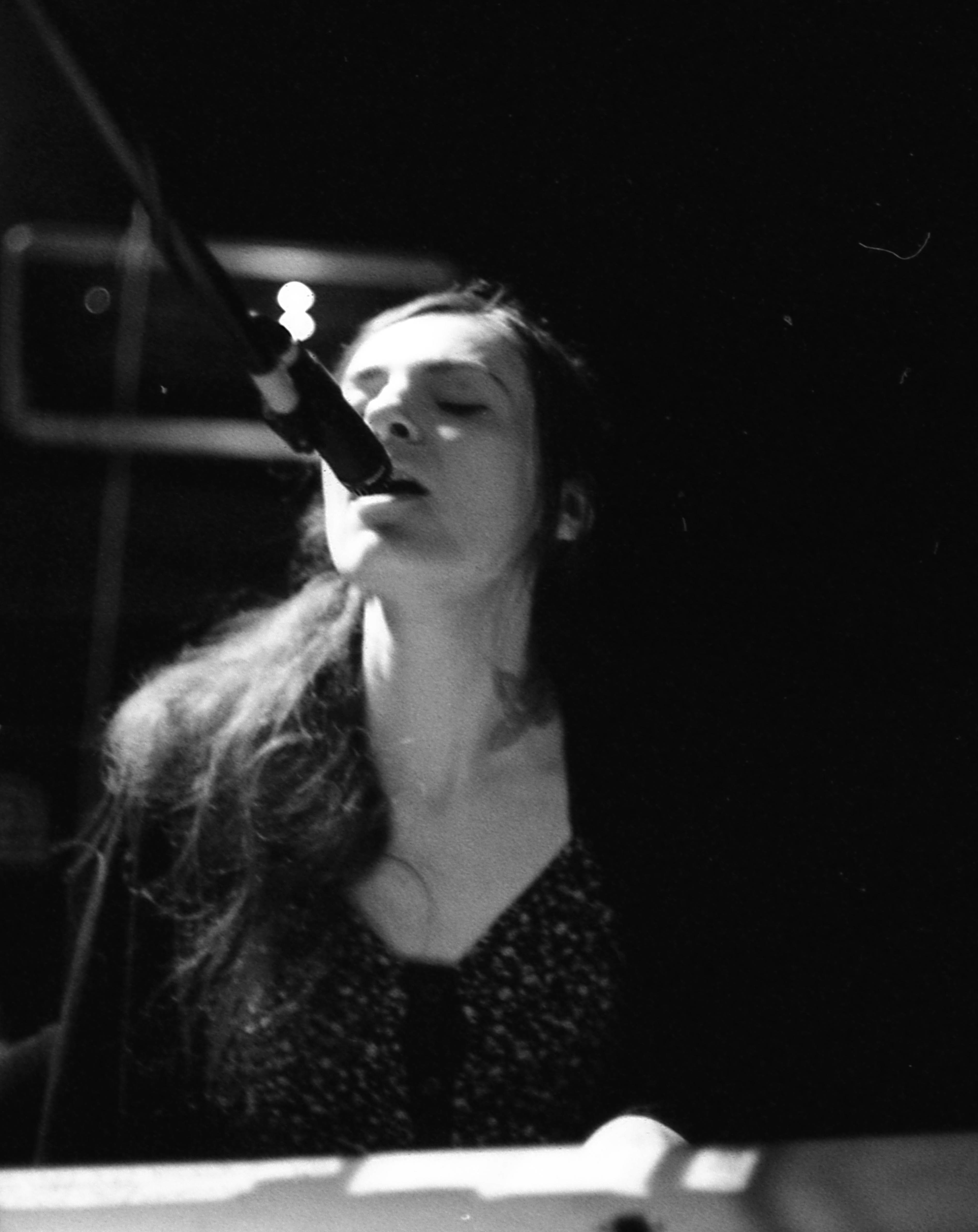

Background information
- Also known as: Mára
- Genres: Drone, dark ambient, post-rock
- Occupations: Artist, graphic designer, musician, singer, songwriter, record label owner
- Instruments: Piano, organ, keyboard, guitar
- Years active: 2003–present
- Labels: Hydra Head, SIGE, Blackest Ever Black

Faith Coloccia is an American artist and musician. She is most known as being the founding member and primary songwriter for the post-rock band Mamiffer. Coloccia has also been a member of Everlovely Lightningheart, Pyramids, House of Low Culture and Split Cranium. In 2009, she co-founded the independent record label SIGE Records with her husband Aaron Turner (Isis, Sumac).

== Music career ==
Faith Coloccia describes one of her first bands Everlovely Lightningheart as being a large experiment that extended beyond the writing sessions. In an interview, she said the project included everything "from my friendship with [band mate] Chris Badger, to the ways we lived our lives, how we talked, what we made, how we viewed the world, everything. It encompassed our whole lives and was very much based on chaos" and elaborated that the band "the project focused on improvisational abilities, chance, collaborations, freaking ourselves out, unlearning old patterns of thinking, and was barely contained."

After Everlovely Lightningheart disbanded, Coloccia took some of her unused ideas from the project and formed Mamiffer. The band started out as a collaborative project with a new cast of revolving guest musicians on each new album, but grew into a duo project between her and Turner with Coloccia remaining the primary songwriter and creative visionary. Coloccia has also been a part of several other bands. She briefly joined Turner's drone project House of Low Culture. She joined Rich Balling's (Rx Bandits, The Sound of Animals Fighting) collaborative project Pyramids. After guesting on Turner's crust punk band's self-titled debut album, Coloccia returned as an official member performing keyboard for their second album I'm The Devil And I'm OK in 2018.

In 2010, Coloccia formed the record label SIGE Records with Turner as a way to release albums they were directly or loosely related to. SIGE also grew out of an interest to maintain control over their releases, have their products hand-made when possible and cut out as many middlemen as possible in an album's creation process.

She released her first solo album (under the moniker Mára) titled Surfacing in December 2015.

== Artwork ==
Coloccia is a photographer, artist and graphic designer. As a child, she was surrounded and influenced by several creative types who drew her toward creating art. Her mother and her mother's friends were involved in theatre, her father was a carpenter, and her childhood babysitter's house that "was made into different worlds and lands, sculpted terrains, and imaginary places" also inspired her. Coloccia's interest in photography developed in part by her father and grandfather's interests in taking photos and flipping through issues of Rolling Stone and Martha Stewart Living magazines as a child. She majored in Fine Arts Photography at Otis College of Art & Design, where she met Chris Badger of Everlovely Lightningheart.

She has created artwork and designed the layout for dozens of albums for her own projects and others including: Knut's Wonder (2010), Helms Alee's Weatherhead (2011), and Old Man Gloom's No (2012) and The Ape of God / The Ape of God (2014).

== Discography ==
=== Everlovely Lightningheart ===
- Cusp (2006, Hydra Head)
- Sien Weal Tallion Rue (2009, Hydra Head)

=== Pyramids ===
- Pyramids with Nadja (collaboration with Nadja) (2009, Hydra Head)
- A Throne Without a King (split with Horseback) (2011, Hydra Head)

=== Mamiffer ===
- Hirror Enniffer (2008, Hydra Head)
- Mare Decendrii (2011, Conspiracy)
- Bless Them That Curse You (collaboration with Locrian) (2012, Profound Lore)
- Enharmonic Intervals (for Paschen Organ) (collaboration with Circle) (2013, Ektro)
- Statu Nascendi (2014, SIGE)
- Crater (collaboration with Daniel Menche) (2015, SIGE)
- The World Unseen (2016, SIGE)
- The Brilliant Tabernacle (2019, SIGE)

=== House of Low Culture ===
- Poisoned Soil (2011, Taiga)

=== Barnett + Coloccia ===
- Retrieval (2013, Blackest Ever Black)
- Weld (2015, Blackest Ever Black)
- VLF (2019, SIGE)

=== Baker / Coloccia / Mueller ===
- See Through (2019, Gizeh)

=== Mára (solo) ===
- Surfacing (2015, SIGE)

=== Split Cranium ===
- I'm The Devil And I'm OK (2018, Ipecac)

=== Faith Coloccia ===
- Stardust w/ Philip Jeck (2021, Touch)

=== As guest ===
| Year | Artist | Album | Music contributions |
|---|---|---|---|
| 2011 | Boris | Heavy Rocks | piano on "Aileron" |
| 2011 | Master Musicians of Bukkake | Totem Three | vocals on "Reign of Quantity and the Signs of the Times / Patriarch of the Iron Age" |
| 2011 | Wolves in the Throne Room | Celestial Lineage | vocals on "Subterranean Initiation" |
| 2012 | Jodis | Black Curtain | vocals on "Red Bough" |
| 2012 | William Fowler Collins | Tenebroso | piano on "Scythe" |
| 2012 | Split Cranium | Split Cranium | guitar and glass on "Black Binding Plague" |
| 2014 | Old Man Gloom | The Ape of God I | vocals on "Eden's Gates" |
| 2015 | Sumac | The Deal | piano on "Thorn in the Lion's Paw" |
| 2016 | Sumac | What One Becomes | organ on "Clutch of Oblivion" and "Blackout" |
| 2017 | Janne Westerlund | There's a Passage | vocals on "So Messed Up" |
| 2018 | Sumac | Love in Shadow | organ on "The Task" |
| 2019 | Janne Westerlund | Bell | vocals on "So Vast the Fields of Sorrow" |
| 2019 | Dekathlon | The Thin Road 7″ | vocals |
| 2020 | Old Man Gloom | Seminar IX: Darkness of Being | vocals and organ on "Death Rhymes" |
| 2020 | Sumac | May You Be Held | organ on "Laughter & Silence" |
| 2024 | Sumac | The Healer | tapes on "World of Light" and organ on "Yellow Dawn" |
