= Two Beasts =

Single by Sumac
- Released: December 7, 2020
- Recorded: February & March 2020
- Studio: The Unknown (Anacortes, Washington); House of Low Culture (Vashon, Washington)
- Length: 18:43
- Label: Sub Pop

"Two Beasts" is a song by the Canadian-American metal band Sumac. It was released as a single on December 7, 2020, through Sub Pop as a part of the 7" Sub Pop Singles Club Volume 5 and was also released digitally. Due to the length of the song and the physical limitations of a 7" record, the song was broken down into two parts for the physical release; one part for each side of the vinyl record.

Tom Breihan of Stereogum described the song as starting out with, "huge, crashing chords, and it returns to thunderous riffage whenever it feels right. But over the course of the song, the band also leans in improvisatory directions, toward drone or free jazz." Vince Bellino of Decibel described the song as creating a, "tense, anxious atmosphere with its noisy sludge and discordant guitars, Turner's vocals a roar over the music, but Sumac aren't afraid to play with the white space, letting notes ring out and playing with the white space in between them to amplify the power of the song." Aaron Grech of MXDWN.com described the song as a, "blend between long drawn out guitar chords and sections, blended in between quicker, more aggressive moments throughout the song. This mixture between aural atmospherics and aggressive metal really creates a sense of two beats, one with a sinister intention lurking underneath and another filled with pure vitriolic rage." Greg Kennelty of Metal Injection suggested the song was for anyone, "in the mood for sprawling, experimental metal that will absolutely crush your skull, then this one is for you." A staff member for BrooklynVegan compared the track to the band's fourth studio album, May You Be Held, stating that it, "incorporates towering sludge metal, textural ambience, white noise, and more."

== Track listing ==
7" vinyl

1. "Two Beasts" (excerpt)
2. "Two Beasts" (excerpt)

Digital

1. "Two Beasts" – 18:43
