= American Dollar Bill – Keep Facing Sideways, You're Too Hideous to Look at Face On =

2018 album

American Dollar Bill – Keep Facing Sideways, You're Too Hideous To Look at Face On

Studio album (collaboration) by Keiji Haino & Sumac
- Released: February 23, 2018
- Recorded: June 2017
- Studios: Gok Studio (Tokyo, Japan)
- Genres: Free improvisation, post-metal
- Length: 66:54
- Language: Japanese
- Label: Thrill Jockey
- Producer: Kondoh Yoshiaki

Keiji Haino chronology
Light Never Bright Enough (2017)	American Dollar Bill – Keep Facing Sideways, You're Too Hideous To Look at Face On (2018)

Sumac chronology
What One Becomes (2016)	American Dollar Bill – Keep Facing Sideways, You're Too Hideous To Look at Face On (2018)	Love in Shadow (2018)

American Dollar Bill – Keep Facing Sideways, You're Too Hideous to Look at Face On (Japanese: アメリカドル紙幣よ そのまま横を向いたままでいてくれ 正面からは見られたもんじゃないから, and occasionally shortened to just American Dollar Bill) is a collaborative album between Japanese free improvisation/noise music artist Keiji Haino and American post-metal band Sumac. Serving as Haino's 86th and Sumac's third studio album, American Dollar Bill was released on February 23, 2018 through Thrill Jockey.

== Background and production ==
Sumac frontman Aaron Turner first saw Keiji Haino perform live nearly 20 years before the recording sessions for American Dollar Bill – Keep Facing Sideways, You're Too Hideous to Look at Face On. Turner was a fan of Haino's music and personal image, and reached out to Haino after some of his friends encouraged him to email his manager. All members of Sumac entered the studio with Haino in June 2017 to record "a series of unrehearsed, completely non-premeditated sessions". By Haino's request, the group performed two improvised sessions: one practice session and a second, entirely different session that would become an album. They recorded over an hour's worth of music across three tracks (two of which were separated into two parts) that became American Dollar Bill.

== Reception ==
Professional ratings
Aggregate scores
Source	Rating
Metacritic	81/100
Review scores
Source	Rating
The 405	7/10
AllMusic	4.5/5 stars
No Ripcord	7/10
Pitchfork	7.3/10
PopMatters	7/10
Rolling Stone	4/5 stars

American Dollar Bill received widespread acclaim from critics. At Metacritic, which assigns a normalized rating out of 100 to reviews from mainstream publications, the album received an average score of 81, based on nine reviews. Aggregator Album of the Year gave the release a 75 out of 100 based on a critical consensus of 9 reviews. Spin listed the album on their "15 Experimental Albums We Loved in 2018" list.

== Track listing ==
Titles and lyrics by Keiji Haino. Title translations by Alan Cummings. Music by Haino and Sumac.

American Dollar Bill – Keep Facing Sideways, You're Too Hideous to Look at Face On track listing
No.	Title	Translated title	Length
1.	"アメリカドル紙幣よ そのまま横を向いたままでいてくれ 正面からは見られたもんじゃないから"	"American Dollar Bill – Keep Facing Sideways, You're Too Hideous to Look at Face On"	19:53
2.	"しまった （白いものを手繰り寄せていったら 何でも出来るようになってしまった 穴を開けてしまった 時間を閉じ込めてしまった 摩擦を起こさせてしまった 忠告を聞かなくなってしまった 誤りを片付けなくなってしまった 不可能を可能にしてしまった？ 悲しみを喜びに変えてしまった）"	"What Have I Done? (I Was Reeling in Something White and I Became Able to Do Anything I Made a Hole Imprisoned Time Within It Created Friction Stopped Listening to Warnings Ceased Fixing My Errors Made the Impossible Possible? Turned Sadness Into Joy) Pt. 1"	9:01
3.	"僕は137%以上の愛のジャンキーだ まだ足りない"	"I'm Over 137% a Love Junkie and Still It's Not Enough Pt. 1"	11:07
4.	"僕は137%以上の愛のジャンキーだ まだ足りない"	"I'm Over 137% a Love Junkie and Still It's Not Enough Pt. 2"	15:41
5.	"しまった （白いものを手繰り寄せていったら 何でも出来るようになってしまった 穴を開けてしまった 時間を閉じ込めてしまった 摩擦を起こさせてしまった 忠告を聞かなくなってしまった 誤りを片付けなくなってしまった 不可能を可能にしてしまった？ 悲しみを喜びに変えてしまった）"	"What Have I Done? (I Was Reeling in Something White and I Became Able to Do Anything I Made a Hole Imprisoned Time Within It Created Friction Stopped Listening to Warnings Ceased Fixing My Errors Made the Impossible Possible? Turned Sadness Into Joy) Pt. 2"	11:12

== Personnel ==
Album personnel adapted from CD liner notes.

=== Band ===
- Keiji Haino – guitar, vocals, flute
- Aaron Turner – guitar
- Nick Yacyshyn – drums
- Brian Cook – bass

=== Production ===
- Kondoh Yoshiaki – recording
- Kurt Ballou – mixing
- James Plotkin – additional mixing, track edits, mastering

=== Artwork and design ===
- Aaron Turner – artwork, design
- Faith Coloccia – design
- Takeshi – photographs
