= The Fourth Plague: Flies =

EP by A Life Once Lost
- Released: January 24, 2001
- Genre: Metalcore, mathcore
- Length: 12:31
- Label: Robotic Empire
- Producer: A Life Once Lost

A Life Once Lost chronology
Open Your Mouth for the Speechless... in Case of Those Appointed to Die (2000)	The Fourth Plague: Flies (2001)	A Great Artist (2003)

Alternative cover
- 7", released on Surprise Attack Records

Professional ratings
Review scores
Source	Rating
Exclaim!	(favorable)
Lambgoat	7/10

The Fourth Plague: Flies is an EP by American metal band A Life Once Lost, released in 2001.

== Track listing ==
1. "Chileab" – 1:59
2. "Our Second Home" – 2:19
3. "The Dead Sea" – 2:37
4. "Prepare Yourself for What Is About to Come" – 2:48
5. "The Tide" – 2:48

== Personnel ==
A Life Once Lost

- Robert Carpenter – guitars
- T.J. De Blois – drums
- Robert Meadows – vocals
- Douglas Sabolick – guitars, backing vocals
- Richard Arnold – bass

Production

- Vincent Ratti – engineering, mastering, mixing

Artwork

- Aaron Turner – artwork, package construction
