= The Deal (album) =

Studio album by Sumac
- Released: February 17, 2015
- Recorded: July–August 2014
- Studio: Studio Litho, Studio Soli
- Genre: Post-metal, sludge metal
- Length: 53:45
- Label: Profound Lore, SIGE
- Producer: Mell Dettmer

Sumac chronology
| The Deal (2015) | What One Becomes (2016) |

The Deal is the debut album by American post-metal band Sumac. It was released on digital and CD formats through Profound Lore Records and on vinyl LP via SIGE Records on February 17, 2015. The album was recorded at Aleph and Litho studios in Seattle, Washington between July and August 2014. The album was mixed at GodCity Studios in Salem, Massachusetts by Kurt Ballou. The artwork was a collaborative effort between Aaron Turner and Faith Coloccia.

== Background ==
In September 2014, shortly after the formation of the band, Sumac announced the track listing and expected February release of their debut album, through Profound Lore Records and SIGE Records, tentatively titled The Deal. The report was made based on an entry in Aaron Turner's official blog, which included the announcement and photos of the band recording. It was also reported that Mell Dettmer and Kurt Ballou recorded and mixed the album at Aleph and Litho studios in Seattle, Washington and GodCity Studios in Salem, Massachusetts, respectively, during July and August earlier that year. On November 21, 2014 the release date for the upcoming album was announced as February 3, 2015. Additionally, the album artwork was revealed crediting cover design to Aaron Turner and art credit to his wife, Faith Coloccia. In December 2014, Profound Lore announced the completion of the album along with an album teaser, confirming the track listing and release date. On December 18, 2014, Sumac debuted the track "Thorn in the Lion's Paw" via online streaming. The second track "Blight's End Angel" was released for online streaming the following month on January 26, 2015. Within the press release included the updated release date of February 17, 2015. In February 2015, six days before the album release, the full album was made available for online streaming.

== Reception ==
Professional ratings
Review scores
| Source | Rating |
|---|---|
| MetalSucks | 3.5/5 |
| Pitchfork | 7.4/10 |
| PopMatters | 7/10 stars |
| The Quietus | Positive |

Upon release, The Deal was mostly well received and garnered largely positive reviews by fans and critics alike. Dean Brown of The Quietus said of the album: "it's as good as you'd hope for from these guys." Commenting on the sound of the album, he noted that it featured characteristics of the "sturm und drang" of industrial metal, the "rhythmic battery" of noise-rock frenzied by the "expressive, crushing bass” of bassist Brian Cook. Brown described the songwriting as “cantankerous in its refusal to give the listener immediate gratification" favoring a "non-linear, more organic exploration of tonality, pressure and release, and devastating density." Brown describes an atmospheric "sense of unease... akin to the effects of a good horror soundtrack" that permeates the album. Brice Ezell of Pop Matters said the album "lands somewhere in between the music of Isis and Old Man Gloom" demonstrating "sludgy heaviness," "nonlinear song structure" and "no shortage of magnificent crescendos." He goes on to say that the "loose structure of the tracks" tend to serve as a "source of weakness," but ultimately defines the album as a "thrilling journey."

== Track listing ==
| No. | Title | Length |
|---|---|---|
| 1. | "Spectral Gold" | 3:18 |
| 2. | "Thorn in the Lion's Paw" | 8:54 |
| 3. | "Hollow King" | 12:21 |
| 4. | "Blight's End Angel" | 10:16 |
| 5. | "The Deal" | 13:41 |
| 6. | "Radiance of Being" | 5:15 |
| Total length: | | 53:45 |

Japanese edition bonus track
| No. | Title | Length |
|---|---|---|
| 7. | "Radiance II" | 6:56 |

== Personnel ==
The Deal personnel adapted from CD liner notes.

=== Sumac ===
- Brian Cook – bass
- Aaron Turner – guitar, vocals, design
- Nick Yacyshyn – drums

=== Additional musicians ===
- Faith Coloccia – piano on "Thorn in the Lion's Paw"

=== Production ===
- Kurt Ballou – mixing at God City
- Mell Dettmer – engineer at Studio Litho and Studio Soli
- Mika Jussila – mastering at Finnvox
- Aaron Turner – addition at recording at HOLC

=== Artwork ===
- Faith Coloccia – artwork, cover co-design, photography
- Aaron Tuner – design
