= Iron Gag =

Studio album by A Life Once Lost
- Released: September 18, 2007
- Genre: Groove metal
- Length: 41:14
- Label: Ferret
- Producer: Eric Rachel; Randy Blythe; A Life Once Lost

A Life Once Lost chronology
Hunter (2005)	Iron Gag (2007)	Ecstatic Trance (2012)

Professional ratings
Review scores
Source	Rating
Metal Temple	8/10 stars
Total-Guitar	5/5 stars

Iron Gag is the fourth studio album by American metalcore band A Life Once Lost. This album displays a much more groove metal oriented direction for the band.

== Track listing ==
No.	Title	Length
1.	"Firewater Joyride"	3:00
2.	"Detest" (featuring Devin Townsend)	3:15
3.	"The Wanderer"	5:18
4.	"Worship"	2:53
5.	"All Teeth" (featuring Anthony Green)	4:40
6.	"Meth Mouth"	2:53
7.	"Masks"	3:49
8.	"Pigeonholed" (featuring Randy Blythe)	4:38
9.	"Others Die"	3:33
10.	"Silence"	3:36
11.	"Ill Will"	3:39

Japanese edition bonus tracks
No.	Title	Length
12.	"Rehashed"	3:19
13.	"Vulture"	3:23
14.	"Pain & Panic"	3:29

== Personnel ==
- Robert Meadows – Vocals
- Robert Carpenter – Guitar
- Douglas Sabolick – Guitar
- Nick Frasca – Bass
- Justin Graves – Drums
- Randy Blythe – Vocal Producer
- Devin Townsend – Guitar Solo on "Detest"
- Anthony Green – Guest Vocalist on "All Teeth"
