= Sumac (band) =

American/Canadian post-metal band

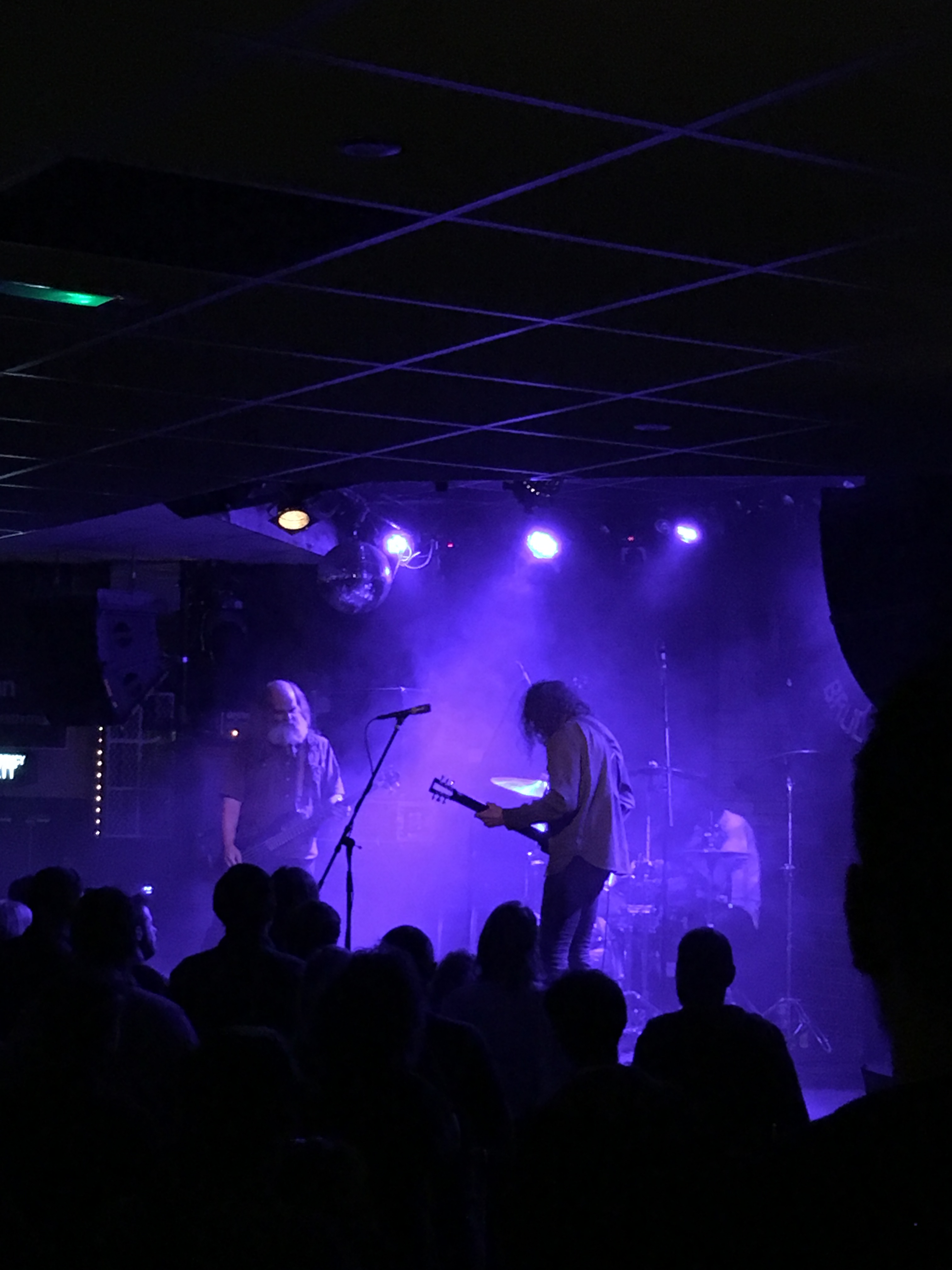
- Sumac performing at Brudenell Social Club, Leeds, UK, 2017

Background information
- Origin: Vancouver, British Columbia, Canada; Vashon, Washington, USA
- Genres: Post-metal, sludge metal
- Years active: 2014–present
- Labels: Profound Lore, Thrill Jockey, Sub Pop
- Members: Aaron Turner; Brian Cook; Nick Yacyshyn

Sumac (stylized as SUMAC) is an American/Canadian post-metal supergroup that formed in 2014. It features the Vancouver, British Columbia-based Nick Yacyshyn (Baptists), Seattle, Washington-based Brian Cook (Russian Circles, Botch, ex-These Arms Are Snakes) and Vashon, Washington-based Aaron Turner (Mamiffer, Old Man Gloom, ex-Isis). Sumac released its debut album The Deal through Profound Lore Records in 2015.

== History ==
Musician Aaron Turner started working on new material that would eventually become Sumac with the intention of writing some of the heaviest music he had ever created. After creating the skeletons of a handful of songs, he turned to Kurt Ballou of Converge and asked if he knew of a drummer that would fit well with the music he wrote. Ballou, who worked with the Canadian crust-punk band Baptists in April 2014 to record their second studio album Bloodmines, recommended Baptists drummer Nick Yacyshyn. Turner and Yacyshyn jammed together and clicked, and Yacyshyn commented that the music they were working on was, "a pretty dense, heavy experience and kind of out there, I'd say. I've never been in a band that sounds like this." Even though both members were a part of other projects at the time, Turner announced that Sumac would attempt to be a full-time band that would continue to write, record and tour, instead of being just a side band. After only playing together twice prior, Sumac performed their first show on stage in December 2014 opening for Deafheaven in Vancouver, British Columbia.

Sumac released its six-song debut album titled The Deal on February 17, 2015 through Profound Lore Records with Turner's own SIGE Records handling the vinyl pressing. Turner invited Brian Cook to be a session bassist for The Deal and "an auxiliary/intermittent member for live performances when possible," although he quickly became a full member of the band. The album was recorded by Mell Dettmer (Sunn O))), Earth) in Seattle, Washington and mastered by Ballou in Salem, Massachusetts. To promote the album, Sumac released the tracks "Thorn in the Lion's Paw" and "Blight's End Angel" for online streaming prior to its release. The band embarked on a short North American tour in support of The Deal in March 2015.

In February 2016, one year after the band released its debut album, Sumac announced they had signed to Thrill Jockey for the release of their second studio album. The new album, titled What One Becomes, was released on June 10, 2016 and is said to examine Turner's "internal and personal struggles with anxiety." On December 9, 2016 the band released 4-track EP titled Before You I Appear which featured remixes of songs from What One Becomes by such artists as Samuel Kerridge, Bleed Turquoise, Endon and Kevin Drumm.

In November 2017, Sumac announced the release of a collaborative album with Japanese multi-instrumentalist Keiji Haino titled American Dollar Bill – Keep Facing Sideways, You're Too Hideous to Look at Face On. The album was recorded in summer 2017 in Tokyo’s Goksound recording studio as "a series of unrehearsed, completely non-premeditated sessions" and was released on February 23, 2018.

A live album recorded at Brian Turner’s WFMU radio show was released on February 2, 2018 through SIGE Records as cassette edition limited to 200 copies.

In June 2018 the band announced their third album Love in Shadow to be released on September 21, 2018 through Thrill Jockey.

Sumac released its second collaboration with Keiji Haino titled Even for Just the Briefest Moment Keep Charging This "Expiation" Plug in to Making It Slightly Better through Trost Records. The CD version was released in June 2019 and the vinyl edition in July 2019.

In 2025, Sumac released a collaborative album with musician Moor Mother, titled The Film.

== Personnel ==
- Aaron Turner – guitars, vocals
- Nick Yacyshyn – drums (Baptists)
- Brian Cook – bass

Live members

- Joe Preston – bass (on select shows when Cook is touring with Russian Circles)
- Don McGreevy

== Discography ==
- The Deal (2015, Profound Lore)
- What One Becomes (2016, Thrill Jockey)
- Love in Shadow (2018, Thrill Jockey)
- May You Be Held (2020, Thrill Jockey)
- The Healer (2024, Thrill Jockey)

=== With Keiji Haino ===
- American Dollar Bill – Keep Facing Sideways, You're Too Hideous to Look at Face On (2018, Thrill Jockey)
- Even for Just the Briefest Moment Keep Charging This "Expiation" Plug in to Making It Slightly Better (2019, Trost)
- Into This Juvenile Apocalypse Our Golden Blood to Pour Let Us Never (2022, Thrill Jockey)

=== With Moor Mother ===
- The Film (2025, Thrill Jockey)

=== Live albums ===
- WFMU Live cassette (2018, SIGE)
- St Vitus 09/07/2018 (2020, SIGE)

=== Remixes ===
- Before You I Appear EP (2016, Thrill Jockey)
- The Keeper's Tongue EP (2024, Thrill Jockey)

=== Singles ===
- "Two Beasts" (2020, Sub Pop)
