= Mamiffer =

American post-rock band

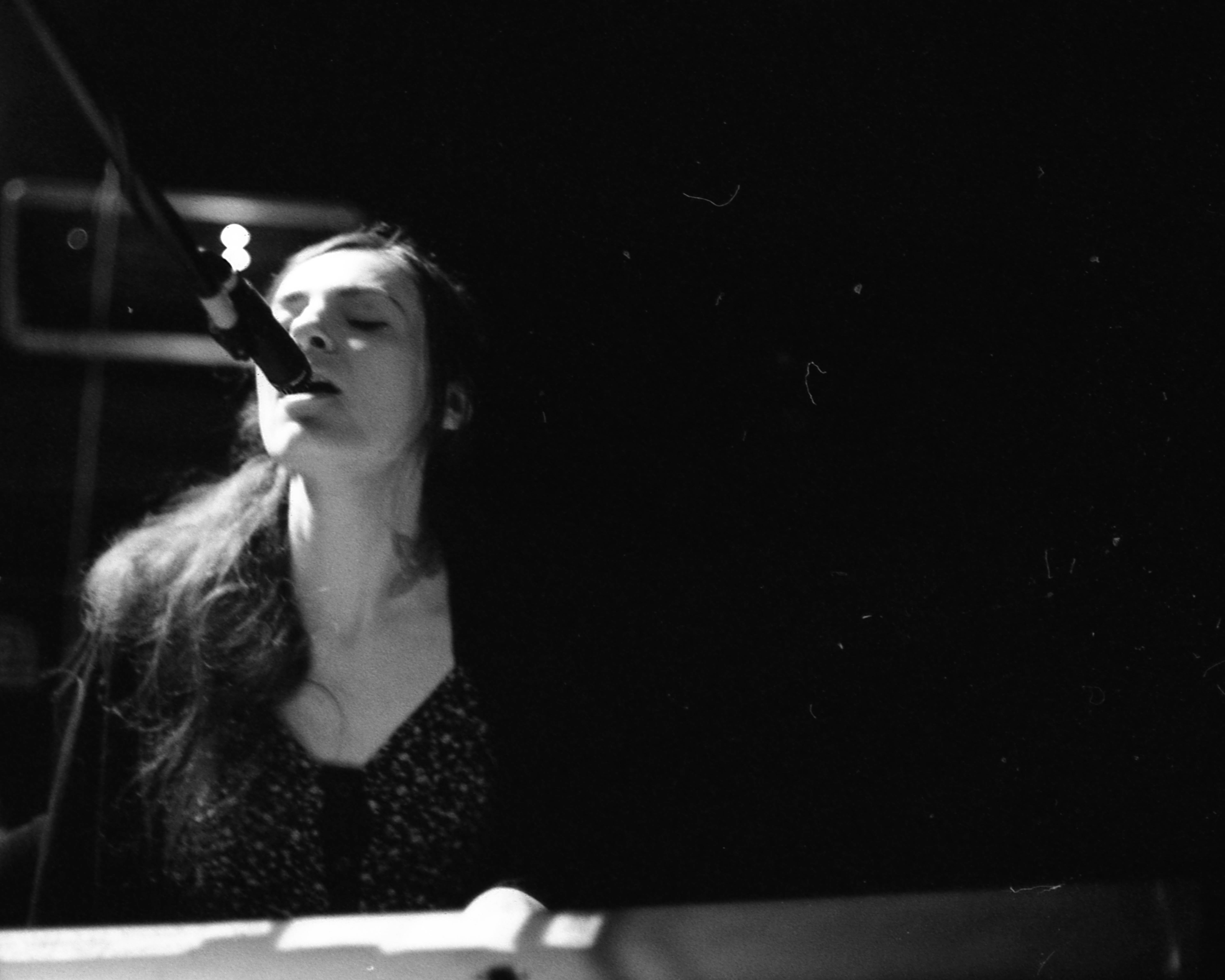
- Faith Coloccia performing in 2015

Background information
- Origin: Seattle, Washington, U.S.
- Genres: Post-rock, ambient, experimental rock, drone
- Years active: 2007–present
- Labels: Hydra Head, Profound Lore, SIGE
- Members: Faith Coloccia; Aaron Turner

Mamiffer is an American band based in Seattle, Washington. It started out as a solo project for former Pyramids and Everlovely Lightningheart member Faith Coloccia that later saw several session musicians and collaborators, most consistently Aaron Turner of Isis fame and who would later become Coloccia's husband. Turner and Coloccia also perform in House of Low Culture together. Mamiffer has released several albums, splits and collaborations through various record labels, most prominently through Turner's now-defunct Hydra Head Records and Turner and Coloccia's own SIGE Records. The band is known for its collaborations, including albums recorded with Locrian, Circle and Daniel Menche; and working with session/guest artists from bands including members of These Arms Are Snakes, Helms Alee, Sunn O))) and Wolves in the Throne Room.

== History ==
The genesis of Mamiffer was born out of creative ideas from Faith Coloccia's then-defunct band Everlovely Lightningheart. Coloccia invited Aaron Turner to participate, but later grew to become "a more permanent member." Coloccia and Turner would also later begin dating and eventually got married.

Mamiffer released its debut album Hirror Enniffer on September 23, 2008, through Turner's Hydra Head Records. The album featured numerous session musicians, including members of Seattle post-hardcore band These Arms Are Snakes (Chris Common, Brian Cook and Ryan Frederiksen) and the Seattle sludge metal band Helms Alee (Hozoji Matheson-Margullis and Ben Verellen) in addition to Turner. Hirror Enniffer was well received by music critics. Tom Forget of AllMusic said: "Rather than being played, their instrumental compositions seem to unfold, revealing their mysteries at a pace that requires patience," while Cosmo Lee of Pitchfork Media said: "The record doesn't mandate how to listen to it. Played loud, its distorted bass could blow heads off. Played softly, its piano makes a fine background."

Three years after the release of its debut album, Mamiffer released its second full-length album titled Mare Decendrii in 2011 through Conspiracy Records. Like its predecessor, Mare Decendrii features several guest and session musicians, including members of Melvins, Earth, Circle, Sunn O))) and Wolves in the Throne Room. This album was quickly followed up by the critically acclaimed Bless Them That Curse You—a collaboration album between Chicago drone act Locrian, released on July 9, 2012, through Profound Lore Records. Coloccia said the recording process, despite so many musicians between two cities, was surprisingly easy. She elaborated: "We found connections between seemingly disparate sounds and images, and unified them into harmonious relationships. With the artwork, it was great to collapse personal narrative, and meaning into something made for the specific purpose of packaging the recording, and keeping in mind the aesthetics and feelings that both bands have created." Eduardo Rivadavia of AllMusic gave Bless Them That Curse You four-out-of-five stars, stating the album, "could be said to muster an unsettling new age for the dark age, and it's ultimately that passion for contrasting sounds and viewpoints that makes this collaboration so powerful and seductive." Craig Hayes of PopMatters gave the album eight-out-of-ten stars, stating: "Bless Them That Curse You illustrates the full potential of two idiosyncratic and hugely creative entities working together harmoniously—seeking out the ties that bind." In September/October 2013, Mamiffer toured North America with French shoegaze band Alcest and British prog rock band Anathema.

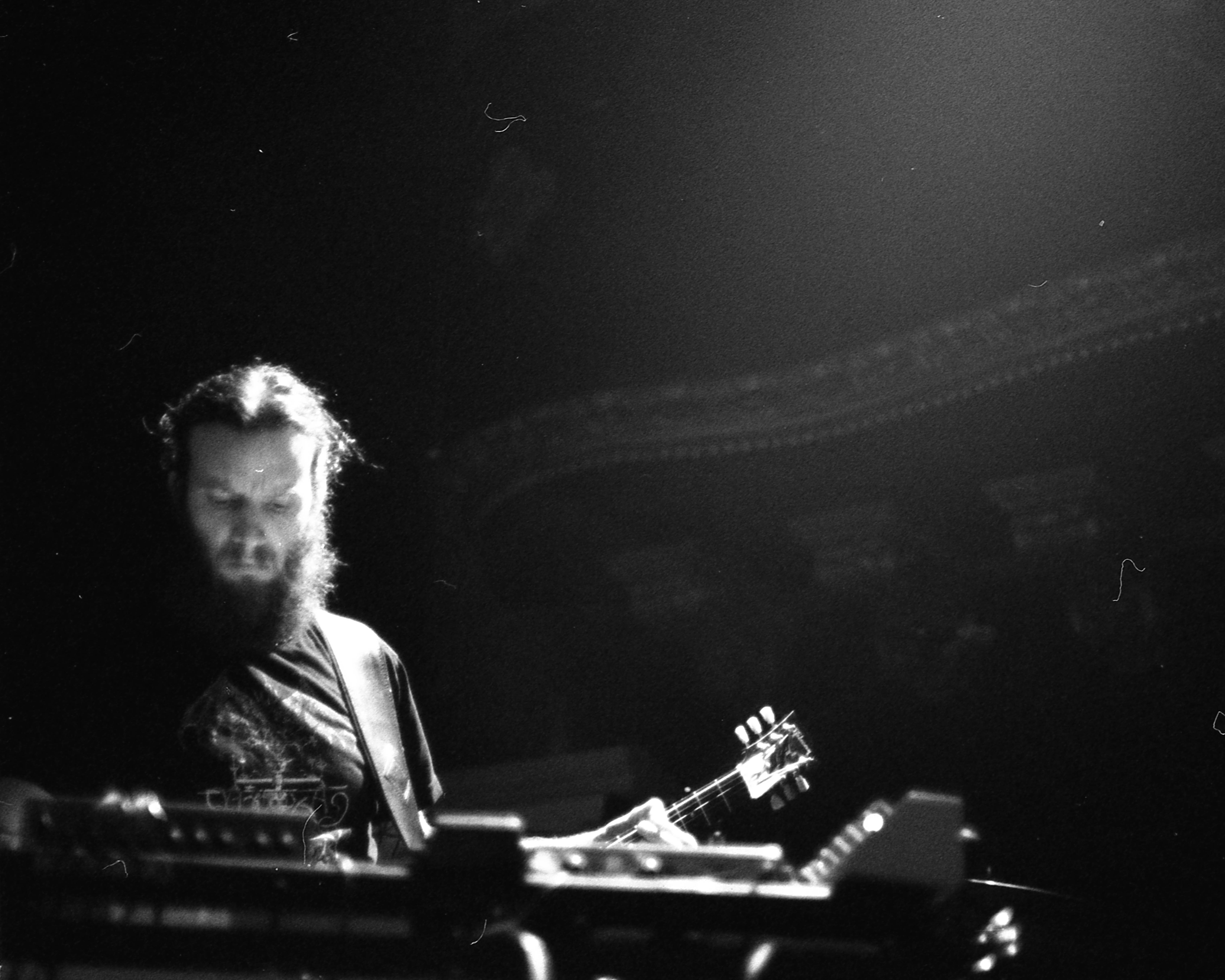
Aaron Turner performing in 2015

In 2014, Italian fashion designer Prada reached out to Mamiffer through SIGE requesting permission to use their song "Flower of the Field" in a commercial featuring Ethan Hawke. The band used the money it received from this deal to fund the recording of a new album. On November 18, 2014, Mamiffer released its third non-collaborative studio album, Statu Nascendi. At the time of its release, the album was described as a "warm-up" release for a more ambitious upcoming album. A year later, on November 3, 2015, Mamiffer released a collaborative album between Portland, Oregon noise artist Daniel Menche titled Crater. Turner and Coloccia previously worked together with Menche on various remixes and videos, and decided to make an album together. Crater also saw the group collecting field recordings, which had Turner, Coloccia and Menche enjoying themselves while "hiking and exploring nature" together. Pitchfork included Crater on is Best Experimental Albums of 2015 list.

Mamiffer released The World Unseen on April 1, 2016, through SIGE. The band began writing songs for The World Unseen as early as 2011 and recorded it between 2013 and 2014. Coloccia described the album as thematically feeling incomplete and imperfect and that it is "an exploration of subconscious and psychic bonds between the past and present, and the ways in which the musical devices of repetition and incantation create hands across the chasm that divide the human from the divine."

In November 2017 it was announced that Mamiffer will release a compilation of samples they used throughout the years at live shows and on studio albums titled Recordings For Lilac III. The album would be released as cassette edition limited to 150 copies only through The Tapeworm label. The compilation is put together semi-chronologically with the earliest materials going back to 2008 and is set to be shipped in December 2017.

== Discography ==
=== Studio albums ===
- Hirror Enniffer (2008, Hydra Head)
- Mare Decendrii (2011, Conspiracy)
- Statu Nascendi (2014, SIGE)
- The World Unseen (2016, SIGE)
- The Brilliant Tabernacle (2019, SIGE)
- Ae/Be EP, (2020, SIGE)
- Mettapatterning for Constellation (2020, SIGE)

=== Compilation albums ===
- Recordings For Lilac III (2017, Tapeworm)

=== Collaboration albums ===
- Bless Them That Curse You (collaboration with Locrian) (2012, Profound Lore)
- Enharmonic Intervals (for Paschen Organ) (collaboration with Circle) (2013, Ektro)
- Crater (collaboration with Daniel Menche) (2015, SIGE)

=== Split releases ===
- Mamiffer / House of Low Culture (split with House of Low Culture) (2010, Utech)
- Mamiffer / Oakeater (split with Oakeater) (2010, SIGE)
- Mamiffer / Demian Johnston (split with Demian Johnston) (2011, Hydra Head)
- House of Low Culture / Mamiffer (split with House of Low Culture) (2011, SIGE)
- Mamiffer / Pyramids (split with Pyramids) (2012, Hydra Head)

=== Live albums ===
- Lou Lou... in Tokyo (split with Merzbow and House of Low Culture) (2011, SIGE)

=== Music videos ===
- "Parthenogenesis" (2016)
