= Crater (Daniel Menche and Mamiffer album) =

Studio album (collaboration) by Daniel Menche & Mamiffer
- Released: November 13, 2015
- Recorded: 2010, 2013, 2014
- Studio: London Bridge Studio (Lynnwood, WA); Studio Litho (Seattle, WA); House of Low Culture (Vashon, WA)
- Genre: Dark ambient, noise
- Length: 68:34
- Label: SIGE

Daniel Menche chronology
Catalepsy (2015)	Crater (2015)	Cave Canem (2016)

Mamiffer chronology
Statu Nascendi (2014)	Crater (2015)	The World Unseen (2016)

Crater is a collaborative studio album between American drone/noise artist Daniel Menche and the American post-rock band Mamiffer. The album was released on November 13, 2015, through SIGE Records, an independent label founded by Aaron Turner and Faith Coloccia of Mamiffer. Crater was created over the course of four years and was inspired by hikes through the Pacific Northwest. On those hikes, Turner, Coloccia and Menche collected field recordings of nature, which make up a portion of the music on Crater. About the collecting of these recordings, Turner said: "the process of making many field recordings together for this record while hiking and exploring nature, was a lot of fun—our mutual obsession with field recordings is one of the things that drew us together in the first place. The enjoyment of each others company in the process of making something together added a lot of meaning to the music itself, and made it all much more like play than work."

Music critics generally praised Crater. In his eight-out-of-ten rating for Scene Point Blank, music critic Spyros Stasis wrote: "Crater is a case of a multidimensional offering. The tracks progress and evolve, attaining different characteristics as time passes. The mysterious tones of 'Aluvial,' the hypnotic sound of 'Husk,' the pitch black darkness of 'Breccia,' the peaceful moments of 'Exuviae' and the melodic interludes of 'Calyx' and 'Maar' are just some of the elements that Daniel Menche & Mamiffer awaken through the seventy minutes of Crater." Pitchfork ranked the album at number 12 on its "The Best Experimental Albums of 2015" list. In his description of the album, Pitchfork staff writer Grayson Haver Currin wrote: "[Daniel Menche's] pace has slowed during the last few years, but his new collaboration with Faith Coloccia and Aaron Turner, or Mamiffer, makes up for the lost time. A half-decade in development, the six-track Crater is a vivid exploration of uncanny sonic phenomena."

== Track listing ==
All music composed by Mamiffer and Daniel Menche. Arrangements by Menche.

1. "Calyx" – 6:19
2. "Husk" – 14:12
3. "Alluvial" – 16:15
4. "Breccia" – 16:19
5. "Exuviae" – 11:25
6. "Maar" – 4:04

== Personnel ==
=== Music ===
- Daniel Menche – arrangements, field recordings, electronics, drones, noise
- Faith Coloccia – piano, organ, vocals, field recordings
- Aaron Turner – guitar, electronics

=== Production ===
- Randall Dunn – guitar and piano recording
- Daniel Menche – additional guitar and vocal recording, mixing

=== Artwork ===
- Faith Coloccia – photography, illustrations, design
- Daniel Menche – photography
