= Light Never Bright Enough =

Live album by Keiji Haino and John Butcher
- Released: 2017
- Recorded: July 9, 2016
- Venue: Cafe Oto, London
- Genre: Free improvisation, Noise music
- Label: Otoroku; ROKU018

Keiji Haino chronology
Only Wanting to Melt Beautifully Away… (2014)	Light Never Bright Enough (2017)	American Dollar Bill – Keep Facing Sideways, You're Too Hideous to Look at Face On (2018)

Light Never Bright Enough is a live album by guitarist Keiji Haino and saxophonist John Butcher. It was recorded on July 9, 2016, at Cafe Oto in London, and was released in 2017 by the Otoroku label.

== Reception ==
Professional ratings
Review scores
Source	Rating
The Free Jazz Collective	4/5 stars
The Free Jazz Collective	5/5 stars

In an article for All About Jazz, John Eyles wrote: "Across five varied and contrasting tracks, the two manage to negotiate and arrive at common ground that does not require either of them to abandon or compromise their individual style."

Writing for The Free Jazz Collective, Daniel Böker stated: "This album... is a great document of two musicians being on par with each other. Both engage fully in the set and still I find it recognizable what Haino doesn't do: He doesn't scream at the top of his lungs, he doesn't take the leading role." FJC's Eyal Hareuveni noted that the musicians focus on "expanding the vocabularies and the sonic scopes of their respective instruments beyond any conventions of genre or style, and in a completely personal and uncompromising manners."

Ken Waxman of JazzWord commented: "Often appearing to play both his saxophones at once, perhaps through feedback, Butcher is able to give as good as he gets from Haino's collection of multi-layered flanges... more of a stand-off than a K.O. for either side."

A writer for Downtown Music Gallery called the album "an uncompromising milieu of swirling sound played out as a total union of these two legendary performers," and remarked: "Haino's blues drenched guitar entices skittering notes from Butcher's sax playing as numerous sonic clues unravel over the course of this unique and compelling journey."

== Track listing ==
1. "I" – 6:30
2. "II" – 6:49
3. "III" – 17:43
4. "IV" – 6:18
5. "V" – 16:57

== Personnel ==
- Keiji Haino – voice, guitar, flutes
- John Butcher – saxophones, feedback
