= Into This Juvenile Apocalypse Our Golden Blood to Pour Let Us Never =

Live album by Keiji Haino & Sumac
- Released: October 7, 2022
- Recorded: May 21, 2019
- Venues: Astoria Hotel (Vancouver, BC)
- Genres: Free improvisation, avant-garde metal
- Length: 58:27
- Label: Thrill Jockey

Keiji Haino & Sumac chronology
May You Be Held (2020)	Into This Juvenile Apocalypse Our Golden Blood to Pour Let Us Never (2022)	The Healer (2024)

Into This Juvenile Apocalypse Our Golden Blood to Pour Let Us Never (often shortened to just Into This Juvenile Apocalypse) is a live album collaboration between the Japanese improv musician Keiji Haino and the American/Canadian metal band Sumac. The album was released on October 7, 2022, through Thrill Jockey, and follows Haino and Sumac's two previous collaborations, Even for Just the Briefest Moment Keep Charging This 'Expiation' Plug in to Making It Slightly Better (2019) and American Dollar Bill – Keep Facing Sideways, You're Too Hideous to Look at Face On (2018).

== Recording ==
The album was recorded live in front of an audience in Vancouver's historic Astoria Hotel as a one-off performance during Haino's 2019 North American tour. As a work of free improvisation music, the four-piece unit went on stage without any planning of what they would perform. In a press release for the album described the recording as, "a musical unit bouncing unfiltered ideas off of one another, mining a trove of textures and timbres from their armory to buoy and bolster these living and breathing pieces. Like so many albums documenting free music, the thrill here is in the tight rope walk, the wavering moments of uncertainty, and the ecstatic moments of shared brilliance."

== Release ==
The group announced the album in July 2022. To promote the album, Thrill Jockey released the track "A Shredded Coiled Cable Within This Cable Sincerity Could Not Be Contained" for online streaming in September 2022.

== Reception ==
Into This Juvenile Apocalypse was generally well received by music critics. Writing for AllMusic, Paul Simpson gave the album a four-out-of-five-star review, concluding: "The entire recording has a more controlled sense of tension and release than the artists' previous collaborations, and both its sprawling valleys and electrifying peaks are equally mesmerizing." Writing for The Quietus, Daryl Worthington's review of Into This Juvenile Apocalypse stated: "The noise rock embodiment of precarity, perhaps, fraying at the edges, almost breaking, but somehow just about managing to stay above water. It only adds to the sense of an existential wrestling match that seeps through the album. These are themes which have long been present in Haino's music. Working with Sumac gives them unnerving clarity." Writing for Treblezine, Langdon Hickman described the album as, "a record that lives up to any given avant-rock or avant-metal great, even by these esteemed players' own robust back catalogs, while also being a record of their furthest mastery of the bleeding edge of jazz and this type of hardcore, prog and metal to date."

== Track listing ==
1. "When Logic Rises Morality Falls Logic and Morality in Japanese are but One Character Different" – 12:11
2. "A Shredded Coiled Cable Within This Cable Sincerity Could Not Be Contained" – 9:29
3. "Into This Juvenile Apocalypse Our Golden Blood to Pour Let Us Never" – 11:47
4. "Because the Evidence of a Fact is Valued over the Fact Itself Truth??? Becomes Fractured" – 12:13
5. "That Fuzz Pedal You Planted in Your Throat, Its Screw has Started to Come Loose Your Next Effects Pedal is up to You Do You Have it Ready?" – 7:10
6. "That 'Regularity' of Yours, Can You Throw it Further Than Me? And I Don't Mean 'Discarding' It" – 5:37
