= Hunter (A Life Once Lost album) =

Studio album by A Life Once Lost
- Released: June 28, 2005
- Recorded: 2005
- Studio: Millbrook Sound (Millbrook, New York); Red Clay (New York City, New York)
- Genre: Metalcore, groove metal
- Length: 36:00
- Label: Ferret
- Producer: Rob Caggiano; Eddie Wohl

A Life Once Lost chronology
A Great Artist (2003)	Hunter (2005)	Iron Gag (2007)

Alternative cover
- Deluxe edition cover

Professional ratings
Review scores
Source	Rating
Allmusic	link
Cosmos Gaming	link
Metal Temple	7/10 stars

Hunter is the third studio album by American metalcore band A Life Once Lost. It was released on June 28, 2005, by Ferret Music. It is the band's most successful album to date, peaking at number 28 on Billboard's Top Heatseekers chart. A deluxe edition of the album was released on June 27, 2006, including a bonus DVD.

== Track listing ==
No.	Title	Length
1.	"Rehashed"	3:19
2.	"Needleman"	3:21
3.	"Vulture" (featuring Randy Blythe of Lamb of God)	3:23
4.	"Pain & Panic"	3:29
5.	"Hunter"	4:05
6.	"Grotesque"	2:55
7.	"Salai"	2:35
8.	"A Rush & Siege"	3:56
9.	"I Give In"	2:40
10.	"Ghosting"	3:09
11.	"With Pitiless Blows"	3:11
Total length:		36:00

Deluxe edition bonus DVD (music videos)

1. With Pitiless Blows
2. Hunter
3. Vulture
4. Rehashed
5. Surreal Atrocities

The Japanese edition (+DVD) also contains a bonus track.

== Personnel ==
Band members

- Robert Meadows – lead vocals
- Robert Carpenter – guitar, keyboard
- Douglas Sabolick – guitar
- Nicholas Frasca – bass, Vocals
- Justin Graves – drums

Production

- Produced by Rob Caggiano and Eddie Wohl (Scrap 60Productions)
- Mixed by Paul Orofino
- Mastered by U.E. Nastasi, at Sterling Sound, New York, New York
- Additional vocal production by Randy Blythe
- Management by John Daley (ESU Management)
- Booking by Nick Storch (Face The Music Touring)
- Public relations by Maria Ferrero (Adrenaline PR ASCAP)
- Art direction and design by Paul A. Romano (workhardened.com)
