= The World Unseen (album) =

Studio album by Mamiffer
- Released: April 1, 2016
- Recorded: 2013–2014 at Studio Litho and Avast! Studio in Seattle, Washington
- Genre: Post-rock, ambient, experimental rock, drone
- Length: 47:43
- Label: SIGE
- Producer: Randall Dunn

Mamiffer chronology
Crater (2015)	The World Unseen (2016)

The World Unseen is the fourth studio album by American post-rock band Mamiffer. The album was announced in December 2015 streamed in late March 2016, and released through SIGE Records on April 1, 2016. The album was recorded mixed and produced by Randall Dunn at Avast! Studios in Seattle with final mastering by Jason Ward.

== Reception ==
Professional ratings
Review scores
Source	Rating
Crack Magazine	8/10
Echoes and Dust	favorable
The Monolith	favorable

The album gained generally positive reviews upon release. Thomas Howells of Crack Magazine called The World Unseen a "wholly affective—and deeply satisfying—sonic experience." Dylan Schink said the album was "incredibly rich... expertly put together to create a deeply rewarding and unforgettable experience."

== Track listing ==
All compositions written by Faith Coloccia. Lyrics by Coloccia and Aaron Turner.

1. "By the Light of My Body" – 2:37
2. "Flower of the Field II" – 3:46
3. "13 Burning Stars" – 4:54
4. "Mara" – 5:37
5. "Domestication of the Ewe I (Est Ovum)" – 10:02
6. "Domestication of the Ewe II (Höhle)" – 5:41
7. "Domestication of the Ewe III (Divine Virus)" – 11:14
8. "Parthenogenesis" – 4:02

=== Japanese edition bonus disc ===
1. "Aušrinė" – 2:42
2. "We Are United In Spirit, We Will Be Happy Forever" – 4:45
3. "Mercy II" – 7:05

== Personnel ==
=== Mamiffer ===
- Faith Coloccia – piano, vocals, choral arrangement, organ, Wurlitzer organ, bass synthesizer, noise, tapes, effects, sound collage
- Aaron Turner – guitar, effects, loops, feedback, noise, sound collage

=== Additional musicians ===
- Eyvind Kang – viola, string arrangement
- Geneviève Beaulieu – additional vocals on track 6
- Joe Preston – bass on track 6

=== Production ===
- Randall Dunn – producer, mixing, engineering
- Jason Ward – mastering
- Faith Coloccia – artwork, design
