= A Great Artist =

Studio album by A Life Once Lost
- Released: June 17, 2003
- Genre: Metalcore, groove metal
- Length: 33:51
- Label: Ferret
- Producer: A Life Once Lost

A Life Once Lost chronology
The Fourth Plague: Flies (2001)	A Great Artist (2003)	Hunter (2005)

Professional ratings
Review scores
Source	Rating
AllMusic	2/5 stars

A Great Artist is the second studio album by American metalcore band A Life Once Lost. Originally released on June 17, 2003, by Ferret Music, it was reissued on LP in 2004 by Deathwish.

== Track listing ==
No.	Title	Length
1.	"Surreal Atrocities"	3:04
2.	"Cavil"	3:38
3.	"The Change Came Suddenly"	4:09
4.	"Nevermore Will I Have an Understanding..."	5:22
5.	"...in Anything Under the Sun"	2:27
6.	"Maudlin"	3:04
7.	"Pious"	4:35
8.	"The Wicked Will Rot"	3:41
9.	"Overwhelming"	3:51

== Personnel ==
- Jacob Bannon – Design, Illustrations
- Robert Meadows -vocals
- Robert Carpenter - guitars
- Douglas Sabolick - Guitars, Backing Vocals
- Nick Frasca – Bass
- Justin Graves – Drums
- Andrew Frankle – Engineer
- Eric Rachel – Mixing
- Alan Douches – Mastering
