= Open Your Mouth for the Speechless... in Case of Those Appointed to Die =

Studio album by A Life Once Lost
- Released: May 2000
- Recorded: April 2000
- Genre: Metalcore, mathcore
- Length: 31:15
- Label: Robotic Empire
- Producer: A Life Once Lost

A Life Once Lost chronology
Open Your Mouth for the Speechless... in Case of Those Appointed to Die (2000)	The Fourth Plague: Flies (2001)

Professional ratings
Review scores
Source	Rating
AllMusic	3.5/5 stars

Open Your Mouth for the Speechless... in Case of Those Appointed to Die is the debut album by American metal band A Life Once Lost. The 2004 reissue of this album, originally released in 2000 in a limited edition, features an improved remix and remastering, all-new artwork, and a trio of bonus tracks, two early demos of songs from this album's follow-up and a more recent live recording. This album is noticeably heavier than ALOL's newer recordings. There is a demo recording floating around P2P networks and the internet of the track "A Falls River Farewell". It includes backing vocals from Anthony Green and is 5:31 in length, as compared to the album version of "A Falls River Farewell".

== Track listing ==
No.	Title	Length
1.	"Joan Said Please"	4:17
2.	"This Is What She Calls Home"	3:27
3.	"The Introduction"	1:29
4.	"Almost Perfect But I Failed"	2:43
5.	"Gentle & Elegant"	5:00
6.	"A Falls River Farewell"	3:20
7.	"Everything Becomes Still"	4:18
8.	"Just Before His Crucifixion"	2:43
9.	"Why Do You Make Me Bleed"	3:58

== Personnel ==
- Richard Arnold – bass
- Robert Carpenter – guitar
- T.J. De Blois – drums
- Justin Graves – drums
- John Hiltz – engineering
- Scott Hull – mastering
- Robert Meadows – vocals
- Vincent Ratti – engineer, mixing
- Bill Sullivan – keyboards
- Vadim Taver – guitar
- Adam Wentworth – design, layout design
