= The Great Bailout =

2024 studio album by Moor Mother

Studio album by Moor Mother
- Released: March 8, 2024
- Genre: Experimental
- Length: 42:34
- Label: Anti-
- Producer: Ambrose Akinmusire; Angel Bat Dawid; Aaron Dilloway; Lonnie Holley; Vijay Iyer; Mary Lattimore; Moor Mother; Maja S. K. Ratkje; Sistazz of the Nitty Gritty; C. Spencer Yeh

Moor Mother chronology
Jazz Codes (2022)	The Great Bailout (2024)	The Film (2025)

The Great Bailout is a studio album by American poet and musician Moor Mother. It was released on March 8, 2024, through the record label Anti-.

== Content ==
The Great Bailout is an experimental album that discusses themes of colonialism and slavery in the United Kingdom. In particular, the album examines the Slavery Abolition Act 1833, which provided financial compensation to former slave owners but did not provide any such reparations to the newly emancipated people themselves. The record's first song, "Guilty", has been described as a particularly direct response to the financial provisions of the Slavery Abolition Act. "Guilty" introduces the "eerie, cinematic" tone of the album and features a layered sound that incorporates string, horn, and vocal parts; the track includes a vocal performance from Lonnie Holley and harp playing from Mary Lattimore.

"All the Money" is an illbient-inspired track that interrogates the means by which the British Empire funded its achievements. On "God Save the Queen", Moor Mother uses sarcastic veneration of the British royal family to critique the ongoing value placed on royalty. The song is built on an instrumental produced by Alex "justmadnice" Farr, which has been described as "deranged anthem-turned-trap" built on "blaring trumpets". "Compensated Emancipation" contrasts gospel- and blues-inspired vocals by Kyle Kidd against a droning, industrial backdrop. Kyle Kidd also contributes vocal performances on "Liverpool Wins", a track that explores how racial discrimination remained embedded in British society even after the abolition of slavery. Additionally, "Liverpool Wins" compares the athletic rivalries between cities to the economic rivalries of competing port cities during the slave trade. The song has been described as a "maniacal"-sounding track that utilizes spoken word delivery rather than "traditional" singing; this characterization was also applied to "Death by Longitude", on which Moor Mother interrogates the Slavery Abolition Act in "aggressive, head-on verses". The album's penultimate song, "South Sea", utilizes the imagery of slave ships to examine historical suffering. It features vocals from the Sistazz of the Nitty Gritty, which have been variously described as singing or moaning, and additional vocal elements such as breaths and gasps.

In an interview with The Guardian, Moor Mother explained why she focused so closely on British history despite being American herself:

I'm not removed from the UK. As an African, our story runs all through the UK. I'm just following the threads. Where we've been. What has happened to us. How we overcome it.

== Critical reception ==
Professional ratings
Aggregate scores
Source	Rating
Metacritic	84/100
Review scores
Source	Rating
AllMusic	4/5 stars
Beats Per Minute	84%
Exclaim!	9/10
The Line of Best Fit	8/10
Pitchfork	7.8/10

At Metacritic, which assigns a weighted average score out of 100 to reviews from mainstream critics, The Great Bailout received an average score of 84 based on 12 reviews, indicating "universal acclaim".

The Great Bailout received particular praise for its thematic focus, which led reviewers to describe it as a challenging album that would nevertheless reward attentive listening. Spencer Nafekh-Blanchette of Exclaim! characterized the project as Moor Mother's "most ambitious undertaking yet", and John Amen of Beats Per Minute described it as a confrontational, "unwaveringly polemical" album. Pitchfork's Boutanya Chokrane stated that, by focusing on slavery within the British Empire, The Great Bailout drew attention to a narrative often overlooked by American audiences. Moor Mother's lyrics have been described as "vivid", "visceral", and "thought-provoking"; critics observed that her delivery utilized "unfathomable sorrow and controlled fury", as well as "bone-chilling solemnity".

The production of The Great Bailout was appraised as being "dense" and "disorienting", with its major elements including "drum machines, jazz horns, and queasy electronic tones". Paul Simpson of AllMusic found the album's sound to be less accessible than Moor Mother's previous two projects. The contrast between the featured artists and the overall bleak mood of the album received critical praise: reviewers characterized the guest artists' contributions as "an act of communal empowerment" that brought "new life" to the album. Lonnie Holley attained particular acclaim for his vocal performance on "Guilty", which Amen argued was potentially his "most heartrending" work. Mary Lattimore's harp performance on the same song was described as showing "masterful" skill.

Elements of "All the Money" and "South Sea" were compared to the films of Jordan Peele.

== Track listing ==
All tracks are written by Moor Mother.

The Great Bailout – Standard edition
No.	Title	Producer(s)	Length
1.	"Guilty" (featuring Lonnie Holley and Raia Was)	Moor Mother; Lonnie Holley; Mary Lattimore	9:54
2.	"All the Money" (featuring Alya Al Sultani)	Moor Mother; Vijay Iyer	4:12
3.	"God Save the Queen" (featuring Sovei)	Moor Mother; Ambrose Akinmusire	3:46
4.	"Compensated Emancipation" (featuring Kyle Kidd)	Moor Mother; C. Spencer Yeh	4:17
5.	"Death by Longitude"	Moor Mother; Maja S. K. Ratkje	5:01
6.	"My Souls Been Anchored"	Moor Mother	1:13
7.	"Liverpool Wins" (featuring Kyle Kidd)	Moor Mother; Aaron Dilloway	4:18
8.	"South Sea" (featuring Sistazz of the Nitty Gritty)	Moor Mother; Angel Bat Dawid; Sistazz of the Nitty Gritty	9:00
9.	"Spem in Alium"	Moor Mother	0:53
Total length:			42:34

The Great Bailout – Deluxe edition
No.	Title	Producer(s)	Length
10.	"God Save the Queen (Movement 1)"	Moor Mother	14:55
11.	"My Soul's Been Anchored (Movement 2)"	Moor Mother	14:54
12.	"Liverpool Wins (Movement 3)"	Moor Mother	20:25
Total length:			92:48

== Personnel ==
- Moor Mother – vocals, recording, arrangement, executive production, samples on "My Souls Been Anchored"
- Alex Nagle – mastering
- Joe Baldacci – mixing
- Sydney Cain – artwork
- Trevor Hernandez – layout
- Jacknife Lee – Lonnie Holley recording on "Guilty"
- Olof Melander – samples on "My Souls Been Anchored"
- Saint Abdullah – samples on "My Souls Been Anchored"
- Uèle Lamore – arrangement on "God Save the Queen (Movement 1)", "My Soul's Been Anchored (Movement 2)", and "Liverpool Wins (Movement 3)"
- Ric Elsworth – percussion on "God Save the Queen (Movement 1)", "My Soul's Been Anchored (Movement 2)", and "Liverpool Wins (Movement 3)"
- Katherine Tinker – piano on "God Save the Queen (Movement 1)", "My Soul's Been Anchored (Movement 2)", and "Liverpool Wins (Movement 3)"
- Alison D'Souza – viola on "God Save the Queen (Movement 1)", "My Soul's Been Anchored (Movement 2)", and "Liverpool Wins (Movement 3)"
- Galya Bisengalieva – violin on "God Save the Queen (Movement 1)", "My Soul's Been Anchored (Movement 2)", and "Liverpool Wins (Movement 3)"
