= Love in Shadow =

Studio album by Sumac
- Released: September 21, 2018
- Recorded: September 2017
- Studio: Robert Lang (Shoreline, Washington)
- Genre: Post-metal; sludge metal
- Length: 66:09
- Label: Thrill Jockey
- Producer: Kurt Ballou; Aaron Turner

Sumac chronology
| American Dollar Bill – Keep Facing Sideways, You're Too Hideous to Look at Face On (2018) | Love in Shadow (2018) | May You Be Held (2019) |

Love in Shadow is the third studio album by American post-metal band Sumac. It was released on September 21, 2018 through Thrill Jockey. Like the band's experimental collaboration with Keiji Haino earlier in 2018, much of the album was recorded improvisationally. Love in Shadow was followed by a tour of the United States in early 2019.

== Critical reception ==
Professional ratings
Aggregate scores
| Source | Rating |
|---|---|
| Metacritic | 78/100 |
Review scores
| Source | Rating |
| AllMusic | 3.5/5 stars |
| Pitchfork | 7.8/10 |
| PopMatters | 9/10 |
| Rolling Stone | 3.5/5 stars |
| Sputnikmusic | 3.6/5 |

Love in Shadow was met with mostly positive reception. The album received an average score of 78/100 from 6 reviews on Metacritic, indicating "generally favorable reviews". Paul Simpson of AllMusic described the album as "a bracing expression of visceral emotions that refuses to go the easiest, most comforting route, as well as the most focused Sumac album yet". Both Chrostopher R. Weingarten of Rolling Stone and Spyros Stasis of PopMatters wrote that Love in Shadow broke new ground, and Pitchfork's Grayson Haver Currin said that Sumac turned "from good to staggering" on the album. Sputnikmusic called the album "startlingly unique" and "the most dynamic and interesting album that Aaron Turner has ever created", but wrote that some of the new ideas were jarring and out of place.

=== Accolades ===
Accolades for Love in Shadow
| Year | Publication | Accolade | Rank | Ref. |
|---|---|---|---|---|
| 2018 | Loudwire | "The 30 Best Metal Albums of 2018" | 20 | |
| 2018 | PopMatters | "The Best Metal of 2018" | 2 | |
| 2018 | Treble | "The Top 25 Metal Albums of 2018" | 4 | |
| 2018 | Treble | "Top 50 Albums of 2018" | 21 | |

Along with the accolades above, Love in Shadow appeared on several Metal Hammer staff members' top lists and as an honorable mention on The A.V. Club's top metal albums list.

== Track listing ==
Love in Shadow track listing
| No. | Title | Length |
|---|---|---|
| 1. | "The Task" | 21:32 |
| 2. | "Attis' Blade" | 15:45 |
| 3. | "Arcing Silver" | 12:02 |
| 4. | "Ecstasy of Unbecoming" | 16:50 |
| Total length: | | 66:09 |

== Personnel ==
Credits adapted from Love in Shadow liner notes

Sumac

- Aaron Turner – guitar, vocals, artwork, design, production
- Nick Yacyshyn – drums
- Brian Cook – bass

Additional personnel

- Kurt Ballou – production, engineering, mixing
- Audrey Lowell – assistive engineering
- James Plotkin – mastering
- Faith Coloccia – organ (track 1)

== Chart performance ==
Chart performance for Love in Shadow
| Chart (2018) | Peak position |
|---|---|
| US Heatseekers Albums (Billboard) | 11 |
| US Independent Albums (Billboard) | 33 |
