= Statu Nascendi =

Studio album by Mamiffer
- Released: November 18, 2014
- Recorded: November 16, 2013 at Avast Studios in Seattle, Washington
- Genre: Post-rock, ambient, experimental rock, drone
- Length: 36:57
- Label: SIGE, Daymare
- Producer: Mamiffer, Randall Dunn

Mamiffer chronology
Enharmonic Intervals (for Paschen Organ) (2013)	Statu Nascendi (2014)	Crater (2015)

Statu Nascendi is the third studio album by American post-rock band Mamiffer. It was released through SIGE Records on November 18, 2014. The album was recorded and mixed live on November 16, 2013, then subsequently produced by Randall Dunn at Avast Studios in Seattle.

== Music and recording ==
Unlike previous efforts, Statu Nascendi features no use of drums and fewer distorted guitars. Faith Coloccia described the sound of the album as "compositionally […] simple" and "repetitive," a trait she defines as a "spiritual presence evoked through a use of minimalism and repetition." She credited this evolution in sound, in part, to a tour the previous year where the band was limited in budget, transportation and member availability. Coloccia described this as the "strengths of limitation" found throughout the album.

Turner said that the decision to live record and mix the album was a direct intention to "recreate the live feeling of our set as accurately as we could—a direct translation of the energy and emotion of the live set—something that's sometimes lost in longer, more elaborate recording sessions."

== Reception ==
Professional ratings
Review scores
Source	Rating
Brainwashed	favorable
CVLT Nation	favorable
Exclaim!	7/10
Scene Point Blank	8.2/10 stars

Upon its release, the album was met with generally favorable reviews. Chris Bilton of Exclaim! described the album as a "mix of ethereal piano and organ, post-rock guitar and crystalline vocals" and an "elemental incarnation, devoid of traditional rock signifiers.' Creaig Dunton of Brainwashed described Statu Nascendi as "a powerful work that strips the Mamiffer sound down to its organic core."

== Track listing ==
1. "Caelestis Partus" – 6:16
2. "Enantiodromia" – 16:14
3. "Mercy" – 6:40
4. "Flower of the Field" – 7:47

== Personnel ==
=== Mamiffer ===
- Faith Coloccia – organ, piano, vocals
- Aaron Turner – guitars

=== Production ===
- Faith Coloccia – artwork, photography, design
- James Plotkin – mastering
- Joseph Anderko – cover photograph
- Randall Dunn – engineering, mixing, producer
