= Mare Decendrii =

Studio album by Mamiffer
- Released: March 15, 2011
- Recorded: September 2009 to September 2010 at Studio Litho, Aleph Studio and London Bridge in Seattle
- Genre: Post-rock
- Length: 60:41
- Label: SIGE, Conspiracy
- Producer: Randall Dunn, Mamiffer

Mamiffer chronology
Mamiffer / Oakeater (2010)	Mare Decendrii (2011)	Mamiffer / Demian Johnston (2011)

Mare Decendrii is the second studio album by American post-rock band Mamiffer. It was released through SIGE records on March 15, 2011. The album was recorded at Studio Litho, Aleph Studio and London Bridge Studio in Seattle and mixed by Randall Dunn and Mell Dettmer. The album was mastered and produced by Mell Dettmer and Randall Dunn, respectively.

== Release ==
Mare Decendrii was released via SIGE Records (CD) and Conspiracy Records (LP) on March 15, 2011. The album was the first to be released through SIGE records, a label founded by Turner and Coloccia specifically for projects they are directly involved in. Turner stated: "We feel that in many circumstances artists lose control of and perspective on the albums they release, and the SIGE was created in part to avoid this problem. We also both enjoy the process of making records from recording to design, all the way down to hand assembly. To have a label that operates in a more intimate a creatively focused way is a very gratifying and important endeavor for both of us."

== Reception ==
Professional ratings
Review scores
Source	Rating
Babyblaue Seiten	12/15
Blow the Scene	8.8/10
Brainwashed	favorable
The Inarguable	favorable
Invisible Oranges	favorable
Sea of Tranquility	4/5 stars

Upon release the album gained generally favorable reviews. Invisible Oranges' Alee Karim described the album as “some of the most beautiful instrumental music I’ve heard in forever” admitting that prior to listening he lacked a “strong impression” of the band. Commenting on the production he stated that the “artsy and introspective moments sit nicely next to the more bombastic ones” defining the album as “the soundtrack for an Andrei Tarkovsky film with a Michael Bay budget.” Adam Rauf of Blow the Scene summarized the album as “a pensive and complex … with tons of layers and subtleties" as well as "a phenomenal effort with plenty of substance.” Eclectic music website Brainwashed described Mare Decendrii as “moody and complex” an album that “doesn’t fit into any specific genre” with a “cinematic feeling that conjures up a lot of feelings and images”. The Inarguable summed up the album as “an ethereal, otherworldly journey through distant lands, physical, Earthly or not.”

== Track listing ==
Lyrics by Aaron Turner and Faith Coloccia.

1. "As Freedom Rings"– 13:50
2. "We Speak in the Dark" – 20:48
3. "Blanket of Ash" – 5:25
4. "Eating Our Bodies" – 12:32
5. "Iron Water" – 8:06

=== Japanese edition bonus track ===
6. "Dead Settlers" – 15:29

== Personnel ==
Mamiffer

- Faith Coloccia – piano, vocals, bass synthesizer, prepared piano, auxiliary percussion, tape samples
- Aaron Turner – guitar, vocals, effects

Additional musicians

- Don McGreevy – drums, tubular bells, auxiliary percussion
- Brian Cook – bass
- Eyvind Kang – string arrangement, viola, violin
- Timba Harris – viola, violin
- Moriah Neils – double bass
- Mika Rättö, Jussi Lehtisalo, Parvaneh Daneshvar, Jessika Kenney, Sera Timms, Joe Preston – additional vocals
- Aaron Harris, Travis Rommereim, Randall Dunn – additional auxiliary percussion

Production

- Randall Dunn – producer, engineering, mixing
- Mamiffer – co-producer
- Mell Dettmer – assistant engineer, mixing assistant, mastering
- Shawn Simmons – assistant engineer
- Giséle Vienne – photography
- Faith Coloccia – paintings, photography, design
- Aaron Turner – design assistance
