= The Film (Sumac and Moor Mother album) =

Studio album by Sumac and Moor Mother
- Released: April 25, 2025
- Recorded: December 2023 – October 2024
- Studio: Studio Litho (Seattle); Antisleep Audio (Oakland); Chicago Mastering (Chicago)
- Length: 56:59
- Label: Thrill Jockey
- Producer: Sumac; Moor Mother

Sumac chronology
| The Healer (2024) | The Film (2025) |

Moor Mother chronology
| The Great Bailout (2024) | The Film (2025) |

Singles from The Film
- 1. "Scene 1" Released: January 21, 2025

The Film is a collaborative studio album by American-Canadian post-metal band Sumac and American musician Moor Mother. It was released on April 25, 2025, by Thrill Jockey in LP, CD and digital formats.

Consisting of eight tracks with a total runtime of approximately fifty-seven minutes, The Film is the second collaboration by the band and Moor Mother, following a remix by Moor Mother of Sumac's "World of Light", which was included on the band's 2024 EP, The Keeper's Tongue. The lead single of the album, "Scene 1", was released on January 21, 2025.

== Reception ==
Professional ratings
Aggregate scores
| Source | Rating |
|---|---|
| AnyDecentMusic? | 7.9/10 |
| Metacritic | 82/100 |
Review scores
| Source | Rating |
| AllMusic | 4/5 stars |
| Beats Per Minute | 87% |
| Exclaim! | 8/10 |
| Mojo | 4/5 stars |
| Paste | 7.5/10 |
| The Skinny | 4/5 stars |
| Sputnikmusic | 4.6/5 |
| Uncut | 7/10 |

The Film was given a rating of four out of five stars by online database website AllMusic, which described it as "a powerful work from two unstoppable creative forces on the same wavelength."

Nick Hasted of Uncut assigned the album a rating of seven out of ten and remarked, "Where Moor Mother's usual free jazz band Irreversible Entanglements give warm instrumental life to poems which are ultimately hopeful for change, Sumac offer grinding feedback symphonies."

Paste rated the album 7.5 out of ten and noted, "The Film is presented less as a collection of songs but as a series of spiritually linked exercises that whip up tensions and reveal obscured truths with force and clarity." Mojo's Andy Cowan gave it a rating of four stars, stating "The take-no-shit insurgency of her scathing poetry (often riffs around a repeated phrase) is matched by Sumac's physicality, fashioning some of the most minimal yet complex, heavy but refined music going." Exclaim! referred to the album as "a genre-defying work", rating it eight out of ten. British magazine The Skinny gave the album a rating of four stars and described it as reading "more like Moor Mother overdubbing someone else's album rather than a synthesis of styles."

Beats Per Minute assigned the album a score of "87 percent" and stated, "With The Film, Sumac and Moor Mother have taken an unprecedented approach, reexamining Afrofuturism through a deliciously dissonant and catastrophic lens, resulting in one of the year's most essential listens." Sputnikmusic's Miloslaw Rugallini rated it 4.6 out of five, commenting that "The Film is that rare kind of collaborative effort that sees both parties' voices enhanced into something distinct, marked by careful restraint and caustic volatility."

The Quietus described it as a "Free Metal apocalypse, unshackled from the confines of structure, hooks, riffs, melody, rhythm, or song," and BrooklynVegan remarked, "The combination of Sumac's gargantuan instrumentals, Moor Mother's desperate calls for action, and the occasional roar of Sumac (and former Isis) vocalist Aaron Turner makes for an experience that constantly marches to the beat of its own thrilling drum."

== Track listing ==
All lyrics are written by Moor Mother; all music is composed by Sumac and Moor Mother.

The Film track listing
| No. | Title | Length |
|---|---|---|
| 1. | "Scene 1" | 4:50 |
| 2. | "Scene 2: The Run" | 12:30 |
| 3. | "Hard Truth" | 1:49 |
| 4. | "Scene 3" | 7:01 |
| 5. | "Scene 4" | 4:13 |
| 6. | "Camera" | 8:43 |
| 7. | "The Truth Is Out There" | 1:16 |
| 8. | "Scene 5: Breathing Fire" | 16:37 |
| Total length: | | 56:59 |

== Personnel ==
Credits for The Film adapted from Bandcamp.

- Moor Mother – vocals, synths, effects, lyrics
- Nick Yacyshyn – drums, percussion, synths
- Aaron Turner – guitar, vocals, electronics, cover art
- Brian Cook – bass
- Kyle Kidd – additional vocals (4)
- Sovei – additional vocals (5)
- Candice Hoyes – additional vocals (3)
- Scott Evans – engineering, mixing
