= House of Low Culture =

Musical project

- Origin: Los Angeles, California
- Genres: Drone metal, dark ambient, experimental
- Years active: 2000–present
- Labels: Neurot Records; Crowd Control Records; Robotic Empire
- Members: Aaron Turner; Faith Coloccia
- Past members: Jeff Caxide; Jay Randall; Stephen O'Malley; Luke Scarola

House of Low Culture is an American musical project which is fronted by Aaron Turner, and included other members of the band Isis. The ensemble also includes Stephen O'Malley from Sunn O))) and Luke Scarola from Old Man Gloom. House of Low Culture is named after a song by Isis from their Sawblade EP.

== Line-up ==
=== Current members ===
- Aaron Turner – guitars, electronics (2000–present)
- Faith Coloccia - piano, synthesizer, organ (2010–present)
- Kevin Micka - zither, electronics (2020–present)

=== Former members ===
- Jeff Caxide – bass
- Jay Randall – electronics
- Stephen O'Malley – guitars
- Luke Scarola – electronics

== Discography ==
- Submarine Immersion Techniques Vol. 1 (album, 2000)
- Gettin' Sentimental (album, 2002)
- Edward's Lament (album, 2003)
- Live from the House of Low Temperature! (live album, 2004)
- Housing Tracts (compilation album, 2010)
- Poisoned Soil (album, 2011)
- Chinatown Squalls (album, 2013)
- Irretrievable (album, 2020)
