= Daniel Menche =

American experimental musician

- Menche in 2011

Background information
- Born: December 4, 1969 (age 56); Portland, Oregon, USA
- Origin: Portland, USA
- Genres: Noise, drone, field recordings
- Occupation: Musician
- Years active: 1989–present
- Labels: Soleilmoon, Alien8, Editions Mego, Sige
- Website: danielmenche.blogspot.com

Daniel Menche (born December 4, 1969) is an American experimental musician and multidisciplinary artist from Portland, Oregon. Since 1989 he has recorded many albums that are categorized as electro-acoustic, noise music, dark ambient music, abstract, avant-garde, experimental, field recordings, drone, minimalist music, percussion and soundtrack film music.

His music has a range minimalist quiet to densely loud. The sound sources of his music are wide ranging and diverse. They include manipulation of acoustic and electronic instruments, field recordings such as storms and nature sounds, feedback noise, electric Rhodes pianos, pipe organs, brass horns, granular synthesis, effects pedals, vocal choirs, prepared guitar and cellos. The core instrumentation is and continues to be far ranging. Recordings are created with analog and digital technology.

== Career ==
Daniel Menche has performed hundreds of concerts since 1991. Countries that he has performed in are: USA, Canada, UK, Japan, Australia, New Zealand, Germany, France, Poland, Switzerland, Sweden, Norway, Italy, Belgium, Portugal, Mexico and Spain. Multimedia art and music festivals specializing in experimental music and video art have showcased Menche’s work since 1995.

Daniel Menche has collaborated with many artists in recording and performance such as: Mamiffer, Aaron Turner, KK Null, Zbigniew Karkowski, Anla Courtis, Damion Romero, Andrew Liles, Kiyoshi Mizutani, Kevin Drumm, Mike Shiflet, John Weise, Joe Preston, John Haughm, Arcn Templ. Menche has also contributed vocals to Sunn O))) song "Hunting & Gathering (Cydonia)" on the Monoliths & Dimensions album.

Since 2008 Daniel Menche has created abstract video art with mostly his own music as the soundtrack. The style of his videos can be described as stop motion photo animation. Black and white photos of nature are animated in a dense and abstract manner. Menche has created music videos with other musical artists such as: Mamiffer, Mara, Nordra, William Fowler Collins and Oakeater, Atriarch and John Haughm. Menche’s videos were presented at the 2012 MUTEK festival at Montreal, Canada.

Daniel Menche’s music has been used for several short movie soundtracks. They include:

- Maudite Poutine (2016) by Karl Lemieux,
- The Reed Trains (2009) by Amir Husak,
- Dirt (1998) and Soulmate (2000) by Chel White,
- Hope and Prey (2004) by Vanessa Renwick

BEAST is a band that was formed in 2013 by Daniel Menche along with various other guest musicians (Joe Preston, John Haughm, Jason Walton). It is a rhythmic noise band that has themes of animalism and is focused on polyrhythmic beat patterns. BEAST is a strictly an online digital only music entity without any physical media releases. His pet Chihuahua dog "Arrow" contributes vocals. Menche manipulated his dog’s noises to be mixed with the drum beats. Arrow has become a cult icon in the social media world for his involvement with BEAST and he was profiled in SPIN magazine for the "Pet Sounds" segment. In 2017 BEAST was featured in an online Adult Swim compilation called NOISE.

Daniel Menche has appeared four times as a guest in the studio at WFMU radio.

Daniel Menche has never received any music training or composition schooling. He is regarded as a self-taught artist.

In 1980 to 1985 Daniel Menche was a successful juggler. He occasionally appeared on children's television shows such as Bumpity. He frequently juggled as a street artist and at children's theaters throughout Portland, Oregon.

Since 2007 Daniel Menche has been employed as a school librarian and is a literacy advocate for children.

== Selected discography ==
- 1993 – Incineration (Soleilmoon)
- 1994 – Static Burn (Soleilmoon)
- 1995 – Legions in the Walls (Trente Oiseaux)
- 1997 – Field of Skin (Soleilmoon)
- 1997 – Screaming Caress (Side Effects)
- 1998 – "Scourge" That's Her Name! (G.M.B.H.)
- 1998 – Vent (Or)
- 2001 – October's Larynx (Alluvial)
- 2002 – The Face of Vehemence (Ground Fault)
- 2003 – Beautiful Blood (Alien8)
- 2003 – Garden (with Kiyoshi Mizutani) (Auscultare Research)
- 2003 – Invoker (Antifrost)
- 2004 – Eye on the Steel (Substractif)
- 2004 – Skadha (Antifrost)
- 2004 – Song of Jike (with Kiyoshi Mizutani) (Niko)
- 2005 – Flaming Tongues (Blossoming Noise)
- 2005 – Scattered Remains: Early Rarities (Soleilmoon)
- 2005 – Sirocco (Important Records)
- 2005 – Together We Shall Melt Mountains with Our Blood (Waystyx)
- 2006 – Wings on Fire (Tantric Harmonies)
- 2006 – Beast Resonator (Roggbif)
- 2006 – Jugularis (Important)
- 2006 – Creatures of Cadence (Crouton)
- 2007 – Deluge and Sunder (Beta-lactam Ring)
- 2006 – Concussions (Asphodel)
- 2006 – Kanticle (Ferns)
- 2007 – Raijin (with KK Null) (Asphodel)
- 2007 – Animality (emd.pl)
- 2007 – Wolf's Milk (Utech)
- 2007 – Glass Forest (Important)
- 2007 – Bleeding Heavens (Blossoming Noise)
- 2007 – Gauntlet (with Kevin Drumm) (Edition Mego)
- 2008 – Glass Forest (Important)
- 2008 – Body Melt (Important)
- 2008 – Progeny of Flies (with Andrew Liles) (Beta-lactam Ring)
- 2008 – Cerberic Doxology (with Joe Preston) (Anthem Records)
- 2008 – Unleash (with Zbigniew Karkowski) (Alien8)
- 2009 – Odradek (Beta-lactam Ring)
- 2009 – Kataract (Edition Mego)
- 2009 – Stalemate (with Mike Shiflet) (Sonoris)
- 2010 – Raw Fall (The Tapeworm)
- 2010 – Blood of the Land (Ferns)
- 2010 – Terre Paroxysm (Utech)
- 2011 – Feral (Sub Rosa)
- 2011 – Yagua Ovy (with Anla Courtis) (MIE Music)
- 2012 – Guts (Edition Mego)
- 2013 – Marriage of Metals (Edition Mego)
- 2013 – Vilke (SIGE)
- 2015 – Catalepsy (self-released)
- 2015 – Crater (with Mamiffer) (SIGE)
- 2016 – Cave Canem (self-released)
- 2016 – Sleeper (self-released)
- 2016 – Raw Cello Sessions (self-released)
- 2017 – Slumber (self-released)
- 2017 – Nox (with Aaron Turner) (SIGE)
