= A Life Once Lost =

American metal band

- Also known as: ALOL
- Origin: Philadelphia, Pennsylvania, U.S.
- Genres: Metalcore; groove metal; djent
- Years active: 1999–2013
- Labels: Ferret Music; Deathwish Inc.; Robotic Empire; Season of Mist
- Past members: Robert Meadows; Douglas Sabolick; Jordan Crouse; Nick Frasca; Nick Hale; Mike Sabolick; Richard Arnold; Taylor Moyer; Alin Ashraf; Justin Graves; T.J. deBlois; Vadim Taver; Robert Carpenter

A Life Once Lost was an American metal band from Philadelphia, Pennsylvania.

== History ==
A Life Once Lost formed in 1999 in a suburb of Philadelphia, Pennsylvania. After the release of their first album, Open Your Mouth for the Speechless... in Case of Those Appointed to Die, on Robotic Empire, they toured with Canadian band The End. After a second release on Deathwish Inc., A Life Once Lost released their third album, Hunter, on Ferret Music in 2005. The group supported the release by touring with Throwdown, Zao, As I Lay Dying, Lamb of God, Clutch, Opeth, and Strapping Young Lad, and took Part in the Ozzfest 2006.

In September 2007, the album Iron Gag was released, featuring musical guests Devin Townsend of Strapping Young Lad, Anthony Green of Circa Survive, and Randy Blythe of Lamb of God. The band supported the album with tours alongside High on Fire, The Dillinger Escape Plan, Saviours, Suicide Silence, and Job for a Cowboy.

The band toured Europe twice in 2008 alongside Himsa and War from a Harlots Mouth, respectively. In 2008, the band headed to Scandinavia and later performed two shows in Russia. In April 2009 the band headed to Alaska for three performances. In May 2009, the band embarked on the You've Got Mail Tour with Thy Will Be Done as direct support.

In March 2012, the band began recording a fifth studio album with producer Andreas Magnusson. Titled Ecstatic Trance, it was released on October 23, 2012. The band toured throughout the fall of 2012 to support the album as an opener for Revocation, along with Canadian band KEN mode.

The band announced their breakup on July 12, 2013.

== Members ==
=== Final lineup ===
- Robert Meadows – vocals (1999–2013)
- Douglas Sabolick – guitar, backing vocals (1999–2013)
- Jordan Crouse – drums (2011–2013)
- John Roth – guitar, backing vocals (2012–2013)
- Chris Weyh – bass (2012–2013)

=== Past members ===
- T.J. deBlois – drums (1999–2002; died 2023)
- Justin Graves – drums (2002–2011)
- Nick Frasca – bass (2003–2007)
- Robert Carpenter – guitar (2001–2011)
- Vadim Taver – guitar (1999–2001)
- Richard Arnold – bass (1999–2001)
- Taylor Moyer – guitar (2011–2012)
- Nick Hale – bass
- Mike Sabolick – bass
- Alin Ashraf – bass guitar

== Discography ==
Studio albums

- Open Your Mouth for the Speechless... in Case of Those Appointed to Die (2000)
- A Great Artist (2003)
- Hunter (2005)
- Iron Gag (2007)
- Ecstatic Trance (2012)

Extended plays

- The Fourth Plague: Flies (2001)
