= Astoria Hotel (Vancouver) =

Historic hotel in Canada, 1913 to 1950

Coordinates: 49°16′53″N 123°05′17″W

The Astoria Hotel is a historic hotel turned into single-room occupancy accommodations located at 769 East Hastings Street in the Downtown Eastside neighborhood of Vancouver, Canada. The hotel was opened in 1913 as the Toronto House Apartments before becoming the Astoria Hotel in 1950. The main floor of the hotel serves as a bar and events space. The hotel is currently owned by the Sahota family.

== History ==
The Astoria, originally the Toronto House Apartments, was built by Robert Aubrey Wallace, a developer from Ontario. The architects of the building were Braunton and Leibert. Upon opening in March 1913, the Toronto House had 87 rooms for rent. After opening, Wallace managed the apartments for a number of years. In June 1933, the apartments came under new management. Wallace remained the owner of the property until his death in 1950. Many of the early occupants of the hotel were working class, such as dock workers at Ballantyne Pier and loggers.

In 1950, operations of the apartments were taken over by Alex Bayer and William Sawchuk, who ran the previous incarnation of the Astoria on West Hastings. The apartments were transitioned into a hotel, and the name of the building was changed to the Astoria Hotel. The number of rooms were increased to 88. The newly renovated space featured the newly installed neon sign, two beverage rooms (split into a women's section and a man's section), air conditioning, heating, a walk in cooler, and a 50-car parking lot. The capacity of the main floor totaled to 400.

In December 1961, a fire damaged portions of the basement and the back of the ground floor of the hotel. Guests were evacuated but no injuries were reported.

In 1977, the Astoria Boxing Club (established 1966) moved operations to the hotel. The club practiced in the basement of the hotel until they moved to the North Burnaby Inn in 1998. The club aimed to help troubled and underprivileged youth from the nearby neighborhood, which was experiencing an economic downturn during the 1970s and 1980s. A number of members found success, such as boxers Dale Walters and Manuel Sobral.

In 1984, Nolan Fisher bought the hotel. During Expo 86, Fisher guaranteed that rents of long-term guests would not be raised despite the influx of visitors to the city. At that time, the Astoria had 40 long-term residents who paid $220 monthly (equivalent to $596 in 2025). Many long-term residents were elderly and disabled.

By 1999, the ownership of the hotel was transferred to the Sahota family, which marked a rapid decline in the conditions in the hotel.

In 2005, the hotel, along with other single-room occupancy hotels the Lucky Lodge and Gastown Hotels, were subject to an undercover 10 week police sting. The investigation found evidence of drug dealing, welfare fraud, and possession of stolen goods. Living conditions in the rooms were also found to be sub-standard.

In 2019, the estimated value of the hotel was $8.7 million. By 2021, the value had dropped to $7.9 million.

== Events space ==
In recent years the Astoria Hotel has been home to a number of reoccurring events, such as Coffin Club, The Dark Eighties, and an amateur strip night named Rent Cheque.

== Incidents ==
In March 1953, a 28-year-old woman named Olga Rutkowski committed suicide by jumping off the third floor of the hotel.

In 1957, a 51-year-old man named Walter Alexander Mascotte shot himself with a .22 rifle in his room at the Astoria.

In March 1968, a man was found hanging from a doorknob in his room at the hotel.

On June 2, 1975, a 61-year-old man named Kelso Dickie died from burns he suffered after his mattress caught on fire in his room.

In November 1986, two men named John Wilfred Dyck and Matthew William Wilson died after the fire escape they were standing on collapsed. The two fell from the third floor to the alley behind the hotel and were instantly killed. Their deaths were ruled to be accidental as the two were heavily intoxicated on Chinese cooking wine.

On September 23, 1993, a 34-year-old man named Stephen Horvath was stabbed to death in the lobby of the hotel. He was taken to Vancouver General Hospital but later died of his wounds. A resident of the hotel named Juan Carlos Gonzales-Mejia, originally from Guatemala was charged with second degree murder.

During the 1990s, Robert Pickton was a regular of several Downtown Eastside bars, including the Astoria. Some reports state that one of his victims, Georgina Papin, was last seen at the hotel with Pickton in March 1999. She was not listed as missing by the Vancouver Police Department until 2001. In 2002, her remains were found on Pickton's farm.

While standing outside of the hotel on August 31, 1998, a 49-year-old man named Raul Melgar was struck twice in the chest by a man wielding a piece of lumber. He was taken to Vancouver General Hospital for treatment but died of his injuries a day later. Melgar was a resident of the hotel and was originally from El Salvador. Despite multiple witnesses, police struggled to identify his attacker.

On February 6, 2018, a 51-year-old Coquitlam man named Martin James MacDonald was found unconscious in a bus stop outside of the hotel. He died four days later, on February 10, from wounds he had sustained during a physical altercation. 46-year-old Patrick Shayne Leeson of New Aiyansh, British Columbia was later arrested for his murder.

On September 16, 2020, two people were found unresponsive in a room at the Astoria. One of the victims was pronounced dead at the scene, while another was taken to the hospital and later died. The deaths were being investigated as a homicide.

On February 17, 2022, an explosion occurred on the 2nd floor of the hotel. The fire resulted in one injury, and the subsequent fire was contained to one unit.

== Popular culture ==
The Astoria has been featured in a number of movies and TV shows:

- Charmed
- Deadpool
- Deadpool 2
- Dirk Gently's Holistic Detective Agency
- The Flash
- iZombie
- Madeline
- The Recruit
- So Help Me Todd
- Supernatural

== See also ==
- Downtown Eastside
