= Electrical Guitar Company =

American guitar manufacturer

- Industry: Musical instruments
- Founded: 2004?
- Founder: Kevin Burkett
- Headquarters: Irondale, Alabama, United States
- Key people: Kevin Burkett
- Products: Electric guitars, basses
- Website: electricalguitarcompany.com

The Electrical Guitar Company (also EGC) is a United States–based manufacturer of all-aluminium and aluminium-neck electric guitars and bass guitars. Operated by machinist and luthier Kevin Burkett, it produces limited run and custom designed instruments. Originally located in Pensacola, Florida, as of 2020 the company headquarters is Irondale, Alabama. The aluminium-necks, bodies and pickups are all manufactured by EGC, with remaining items being sourced from high-quality manufacturers such as Grover, Gotoh and Switchcraft. The aluminium necks are machined from Alcoa T6061.

Early versions of the EGC "Standard" model started appearing around 2004, with later models appending numbers after the style. Series 1, 2, 3, etc. EGC is also known for notable artist signature models.

The company also builds reissues of Travis Bean guitars and basses under the Travis Bean Designs imprint.
