= May You Be Held =

Studio album by Sumac
- Released: October 2, 2020
- Recorded: 2017–2019
- Studio: The Unknown (Anacortes, Washington); HoLC (Vashon, Washington); Robert Lang (Shoreline, Washington)
- Genre: Post-metal
- Length: 59:44
- Label: Thrill Jockey
- Producer: Matt Bayles

Sumac chronology
Love in Shadow (2018)	May You Be Held (2020)	Into This Juvenile Apocalypse Our Golden Blood to Pour Let Us Never (2022)

May You Be Held is the fourth studio album by Canadian-American metal band Sumac. The album was released on October 2, 2020 through Thrill Jockey, pushed back from its original release date of September 18. To promote the album, Sumac released the track "The Iron Chair" for online streaming in July 2020. Sumac asked Thrill Jockey to refrain from posting the album to the music streaming platform Spotify due to what the band referred to as CEO Daniel Ek's "pretty repugnant statements" made earlier in 2020 about artists not performing well on the site.

May You Be Held was recorded over three years (2017–2019) and recorded at three different recordings studios, primarily in Washington state. Kurt Ballou (Converge) who produced Sumac's What One Becomes (2016) and Love in Shadow (2018) returned to mix the album, while it was recorded by Matt Bayles (Isis, Botch).

== Track listing ==
May You Be Held track listing
No.	Title	Length
1.	"A Prayer for Your Path"	5:38
2.	"May You Be Held"	19:52
3.	"The Iron Chair"	8:16
4.	"Consumed"	16:58
5.	"Laughter & Silence"	9:00
Total length:		59:44

== Personnel ==
Sumac

- Brian Cook – bass
- Aaron Turner – guitars, vocals
- Nick Yacyshyn – drums, percussion

Additional musicians

- Faith Coloccia – organ on "Laughter and Silence"

Production

- Kurt Ballou – mixing, additional recording
- Matt Bayles – recording
- Matt Colton – mastering
- Aaron Turner – additional recording
- Nicholas Wilbur – assistant engineering

Artwork

- Aaron Turner – artwork, design
