= Hirror Enniffer =

Studio album by Mamiffer
- Released: September 23, 2008
- Genre: Post-rock, ambient, experimental rock, drone
- Length: 34:34
- Label: Hydra Head
- Producer: Chris Common

Mamiffer chronology
Hirror Enniffer (2008)	Mamiffer / House of Low Culture (2010)

Hirror Enniffer is the first studio album by American post-rock band Mamiffer. It was released through Hydra Head Records on September 23, 2008. The album was recorded, mixed and produced by Chris Common with mastering by Ed Brooks at RFI Mastering in Seattle.

Professional ratings
Review scores
Source	Rating
Exclaim!	mixed
Pitchfork	7.5/10
The Stranger	3/5 stars

== Track listing ==
1. "This Land" – 6:15
2. "Death Shawl" – 4:10
3. "Annwn" – 5:43
4. "Black Running Water" – 6:14
5. "Suckling a Dead Litter" – 7:37
6. "Cyhraeth" – 4:35

== Personnel ==
=== Mamiffer ===
- Faith Coloccia– piano, vocals, glockenspiel, melodica, bells, mellotron, electric piano, percussion (jars, chains), synthesizer, loops, organ, acoustic guitar
- Aaron Turner – guitar, acoustic guitar, bass

=== Additional musicians ===
- Chris Common – percussion, drums, bells, effects
- Brian Cook – bass
- Annie Hozoji Matheson-Margullis – cello, additional vocals
- Ryan Frederiksen – guitar
- Kelly Akashi – additional vocals
- Sarine Ashjian – additional vocals
- Will Adams – additional vocals

=== Production ===
- Ed Brooks – mastering
- Chris Common – engineering, producer, mixing
