= What One Becomes =

Studio album by Sumac
- Released: June 10, 2016
- Recorded: November 2015
- Studio: The Unknown in Anacortes, Washington
- Genre: Post-metal, sludge metal
- Length: 58:44
- Label: Thrill Jockey
- Producer: Kurt Ballou

Sumac chronology
The Deal (2015)	What One Becomes (2016)	American Dollar Bill – Keep Facing Sideways, You're Too Hideous to Look at Face On (2018)

Singles from Sumac
- 1. "Rigid Man" Released: March 31, 2016

What One Becomes is the second studio album by American post-metal band Sumac. It was released on June 10, 2016 through Thrill Jockey. The album was recorded at The Unknown studio in Anacortes then mixed and produced by Kurt Ballou at GodCity Studio in Salem.

== Background ==
In November 2015, it was announced that the band was in at Phil Elverum’s co-owned studio The Unknown tracking the follow-up to their 2015 debut, The Deal. Reports also confirmed that Kurt Ballou (Converge) would be reprising his role as mixer as well as taking on production and engineering duties for the album. On March 18, 2016 an album teaser was released that featured footage of the recording process along with a brief flash of the words "what one becomes". Three days later the forthcoming album's title was confirmed as What One Becomes alongside premiere single “Rigid Man” as well as the track list and release date.

== Concept ==
In a press release the band offered an explanation, in part, to the theme of the album guitarist Aaron Turner stated: "Much of it has to do with questioning fabricated structures of identity and what it means when those structures are destabilized by contact with the outside. That has been a unnerving process to undergo, but also fruitful in terms of discovering the path to individuation and realized connection with the self. Another facet of experience I'm working to convey is about living with the sustained presence of anxiety, and avoiding reliance on musical devices of cathartic release to provide escape from this condition."

== Critical reception ==
Professional ratings
Aggregate scores
Source	Rating
Metacritic	74/100
Review scores
Source	Rating
AllMusic	3.5/5 stars
The A.V. Club	A
Exclaim!	7/10
Metal Hammer	3.5/5 stars
Metal Injection	8/10
MetalSucks	4.5/5 stars
Pitchfork	7.8/10
PopMatters	5/10 stars
Revolver	4/5

What One Becomes was met with very positive reviews from music critics. At Metacritic (a review aggregator site which assigns a normalized rating out of 100 from music critics), based on 10 critics, the album has received a score of 74/100, which indicates "generally favorable reviews". The A.V. Club wrote that "It’s hard to imagine a better metal record coming out this year", praising the performances of Turner, Yacyshyn, and Cook. "What One Becomes shows Cook and Turner again occupying highly coveted space on the zenith of aggressive music—this time alongside Yacyshyn, the percussive mastermind. It’s hard to imagine a better metal record coming out this year." Pitchfork praised the album for breaking new ground, writing that the album "feels more improvisatory than most of any of the members’ prior works (especially bassist Brian Cook, better known for his work in modern prog-metal heroes Russian Circles), and that makes it alien to most metal. Sumac are pushing metal in a direction so uncomfortable it may cease to be metal, into an openness that isn't about saying “FUCK YOU!” the loudest. The result is some of his most exciting work since Isis disbanded."

== Track listing ==
No.	Title	Length
1.	"Image of Control"	9:57
2.	"Rigid Man"	10:35
3.	"Clutch of Oblivion"	10:59
4.	"Blackout"	17:25
5.	"Will to Reach"	9:48

=== Japanese edition bonus track ===
6. "Rigid Man in Vain" (Kevin Drumm remix) – 7:55

=== Spotify track listing ===
1. "Image of Control (I)" – 3:58
2. "Image of Control (II)" – 6:00
3. "Rigid Man (I)" – 5:24
4. "Rigid Man (II)" – 5:11
5. "Clutch of Oblivion (I)" – 5:39
6. "Clutch of Oblivion (II)" – 5:21
7. "Blackout (I)" – 9:57
8. "Blackout (II)" – 6:54
9. "Blackout (III)" – 0:35
10. "Will to Reach" – 9:49

== Personnel ==
Sumac

- Aaron Turner – guitar, vocals
- Nick Yacyshyn – drums
- Brian Cook – bass

Technical personnel

- Kurt Ballou – production, engineering, mixing

== Charts ==
Chart (2016)	Peak position
US Heatseekers Albums (Billboard)	10
