= PSOTY discography =

Band discography

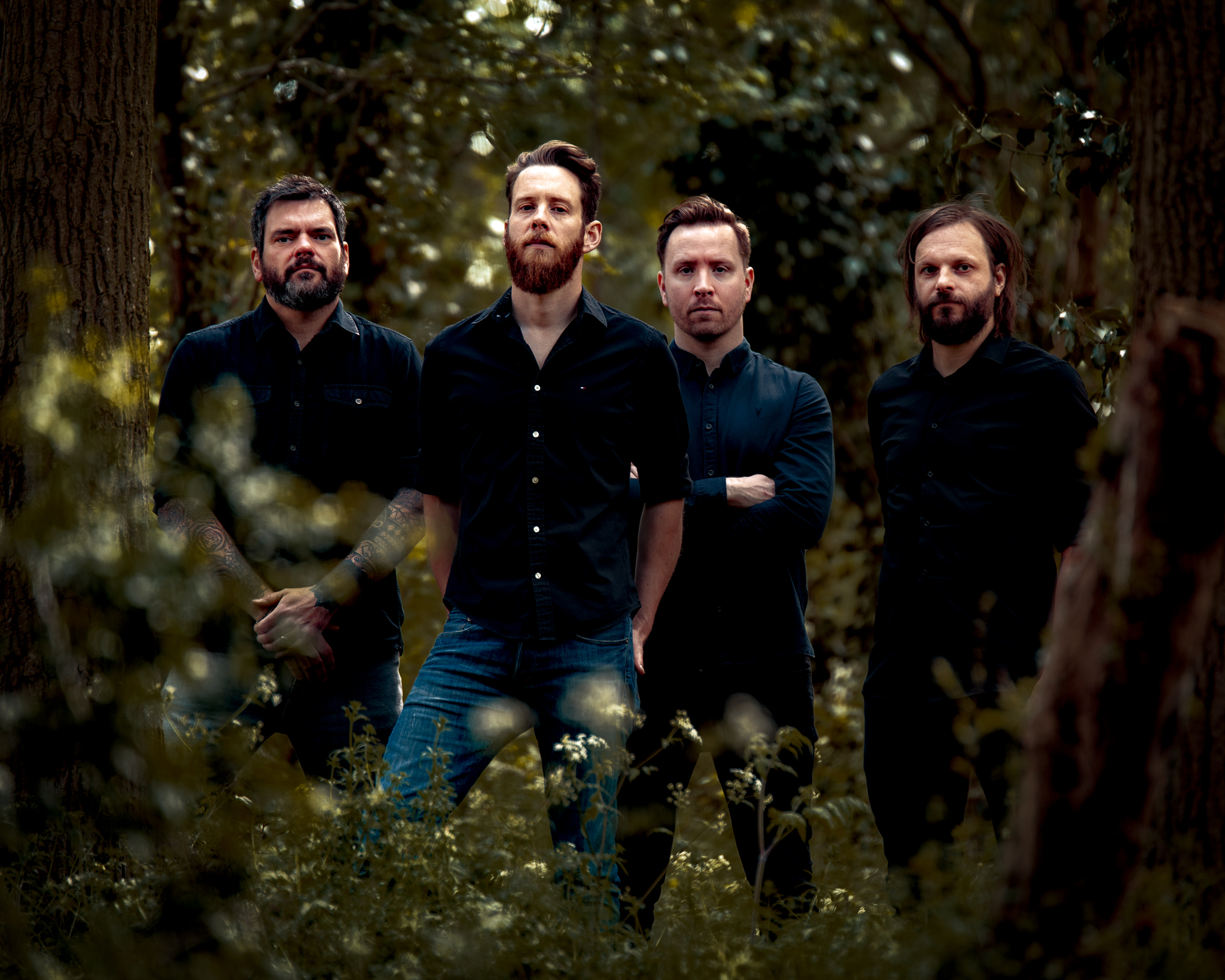
- PSOTY in 2019
- Studio albums: 2
- EPs: 3
- Singles: 3
- Music videos: 1

The discography of English post-metal/post-rock band PSOTY (originally named Pet Slimmers of the Year) includes two studio albums, three extended plays, three singles, and one music video. The band recorded two demo songs, "Urquidez" in March 2008, and "Everything I Have Ever Done Has Led Me to This Point" in April 2008, which were later combined on the self-released EP, Why Won't You Die. Another stand-alone track, "Brujas", was recorded in September 2008, and later appeared exclusively on the Canadian record label Abridged Pause Recordings' Various Artists compilation, Diluvian Temperals, on 24 August 2009.

Pet Slimmers of the Year recorded three songs for its eponymous EP, Pet Slimmers of the Year, in October 2008, which was released digitally via the British netlabel Lost Children Net Label on 15 January 2009. In May 2009, the band began demoing material for its follow-up EP; one of these recordings, "Untitled", later appeared exclusively on Abridged Pause Recordings' Various Artists compilation Billowing Tempestus in April 2016. Pet Slimmers of the Year recorded five songs for its next EP, ...And the Sky Fell, in January and February 2010; the release was issued via Lost Children Net Label on 27 June 2010. Both Lost Children Net Label EPs were later re-issued on CD and digitally by the band.

In April 2012, Pet Slimmers of the Year recorded the single "Days Since I Disappeared", and a music video was later filmed for the song in November 2012; the single was released after considerable delay via British management company-turned record label, Anchor Music, on 26 August 2013. The song appeared on the band's debut full-length album, Fragments of Uniforms (the rest of which was recorded in June 2013), which was first released as a limited edition CD through Anchor Music on 31 October 2013, before the band was signed with the British record label Candlelight Records in January 2014. "Days Since I Disappeared" was re-issued via Candlelight Records on 13 January 2014, while Fragments of Uniforms was re-issued via Candlelight Records on CD and digitally on 14 April 2014, and a coloured double-LP version followed on Back on Black Records on 23 June 2014. Candlelight Records also included "Days Since I Disappeared" on its Various Artists compilation Candlelight Records Presents: Legion III, released on 28 April 2014.

In January 2016, PSOTY joined the Finish record label Spinefarm Records and the Dutch-American corporation Universal Music Group's roster, and followed up with its sophomore full-length album, Sunless, which was recorded in February and March 2019, and released on CD, double-LP and digitally on 13 September 2019. The album was preceded by the singles "Oil Blood", released on 26 July 2019, and "King of Ephyra", released a week ahead of the album, on 6 September 2019.

== Albums ==
=== Studio albums ===
Title	Album details
Fragments of Uniforms	Released: 31 October 2013; Label: Anchor / Candlelight / Back on Black
Sunless	Released: 13 September 2019; Label: Candlelight / Spinefarm / Universal

== Extended plays ==
Title	EP details
Why Won't You Die	Released: April 2008; Label: self-released
Pet Slimmers of the Year	Released: 15 January 2009; Label: Lost Children
...And the Sky Fell	Released: 27 June 2010; Label: Lost Children

== Singles ==
Title	Single details
"Days Since I Disappeared"	Released: 26 August 2013; Label: Anchor / Candlelight
"Oil Blood"	Released: 26 July 2019; Label: Candlelight / Spinefarm / Universal
"King of Ephyra"	Released: 6 September 2019; Label: Candlelight / Spinefarm / Universal

== Videos ==
=== Music videos ===
List of music videos, with directors, showing date released along with albums
Title	Date	Director(s)	Album
"Days Since I Disappeared"	23 August 2013	Phil Berridge	Fragments of Uniforms

== Other appearances ==
=== Various Artists compilations ===
Song	Date	Various Artists Album	Label	Original Album
"Brujas"	24 August 2009	Abridged Pause Recordings Presents: Diluvian Temperals	Abridged Pause	exclusive
"One Down"	March 2010	Rowdy Farrago Presents: This Is Peterborough Too!	Rowdy Farrago	Pet Slimmers of the Year
"One Down"	10 October 2010	Bezdna Radio Essentials 018	Silent Flow	Pet Slimmers of the Year
"Moravka"	January 2011	Rowdy Farrago Presents: This Is Peterborough Thrice	Rowdy Farrago	...And the Sky Fell
"World Without Stars"	5 May 2011	Bezdna Radio Essentials 022	Silent Flow	Pet Slimmers of the Year
"Days Since I Disappeared"	28 April 2014	Candlelight Records Presents: Legion III	Candlelight	Fragments of Uniforms
"Untitled"	April 2016	Abridged Pause Recordings Presents: Billowing Tempestus	Abridged Pause	exclusive
