= After the Ceiling Cracked =

Box set by Pelican
- Released: 2008
- Recorded: 2003–2006
- Genre: Post-metal
- Label: Hydra Head Records
- Producer: Mike Ward

Pelican chronology
Pink Mammoth (2007)	After the Ceiling Cracked (2008)	Ephemeral (2009)

After the Ceiling Cracked is a multi-format set by American post-metal band Pelican. It features Pelican's London live set from December 20, 2005, interviews and live bonus material shot at various stops on the band's past US tours, a video for “Autumn Into Summer,” and an extensive photo gallery.

Live material from Scala was shot by British-based outfit Muckspreader Productions. Also included is a 3" audio CD containing two versions of the song “Pink Mammoth” (a major key reworking of the Untitled EP track “Mammoth”) — one of which features all the members of Seattle group These Arms Are Snakes — and “End of Seasons,” a Prefuse 73 remix medley of “Aurora Borealis,” and the untitled track from The Fire in Our Throats Will Beckon the Thaw.

== Track listing ==
DVD Content: Live from Scala, King's Cross, London, December 20, 2005:

1. March Into the Sea
2. Autumn Into Summer
3. NightEndDay
4. Last Day of Winter
5. Aurora Borealis
6. Sirius
7. Australasia

Live Footage Collection 2003-2006:

1. "Sirius" (interview w/ Larry and Laurent) "NightEndDay" and "City of Echoes" live from Neumo's Crystal Ball, Seattle, WA 06/03/06
2. "Pink Mammoth" and extra footage live from The Troubadour, Los Angeles 05/29/06
3. "Last Day of Winter" live from Nanci Raygun, Richmond, VA 05/12/06
4. "GW" live from Sabalas, Portland, OR 08/13/05
5. "Mammoth," Drought," and "Red Ran Amber" live from The Nyabinghi, Youngstown, OH 05/30/04
6. "Forecast for Today" and "The Woods" live from The Nyabinghi, Youngstown, OH 10/11/03
7. "Autumn Into Summer" music video

Photo and art gallery:

1. Photos and posters from all eras of the band

3" CD Content:

1. Pink Mammoth
2. End of Seasons (Prefuse 73 Remix)
3. These Arms are Pink Mammoths (the song "Pink Mammoth" featuring These Arms Are Snakes for additional musical support)
