= Deny the Absolute =

Single by Pelican

from the album Forever Becoming
- A-side: "Deny the Absolute"
- B-side: "The Truce"
- Released: August 20, 2013
- Genre: Post-metal
- Label: Mylene Sheath (Sheath045)
- Songwriters: Trevor de Brauw, Bryan Herweg, Larry Herweg, Dallas Thomas

"Deny the Absolute" is a song by American post-metal band Pelican and originates from the group's 2013 studio album Forever Becoming. Prior to the release of Forever Becoming, an alternate version of "Deny the Absolute" was released in two formats on August 20, 2013. The first was a 7" vinyl-only single released through The Mylene Sheath featuring the B-side "The Truce," and the second was an iTunes-only compilation EP released through Southern Lord Recordings featuring tracks from Pelican's previous Southern Lord releases such as What We All Come to Need, Ephemeral and a music video for "Lathe Biosas" from Ataraxia/Taraxis directed by Diona Mavis.

The alternate version of "Deny the Absolute" was generally well received by music critics. Kevin McFarland of The A.V. Club wrote that the song is, "five and a half minutes of relentlessly thundering forward momentum—assisted by some of the most delicate double-bass drumming you'll ever hear—and yet more proof that pelicans are awesomely terrifying animals that should be feared by all." Jayson Greene of Pitchfork wrote that the song is, "one of the most fevered churns they've managed in years, with maligned drummer Larry's hard, effective fills pushing the song forward like a thumb jabbed in your back. Like the best Pelican, it seems to form its own words as you listen." Gregory Adams of Exclaim! wrote that, "While the track immediately steamrolls into an ecstatic post-metal clatter of drum bursts and detuned, interlocking melodies, a deft and damaging midsection locks into a murky, trilled-out groove."

== Track listing ==
7" single
No.	Title	Length
1.	"Deny the Absolute" (Alternate Version)	5:33
2.	"The Truce"	3:16

iTunes EP
No.	Title	Length
1.	"Deny the Absolute"	5:33
2.	"Strung Up from the Sky"	5:12
3.	"The Creeper"	6:10
4.	"Ephemeral"	5:23
5.	"Lathe Biosas" (Music Video)	6:27
