= PSOTY =

English post-metal/post-rock band

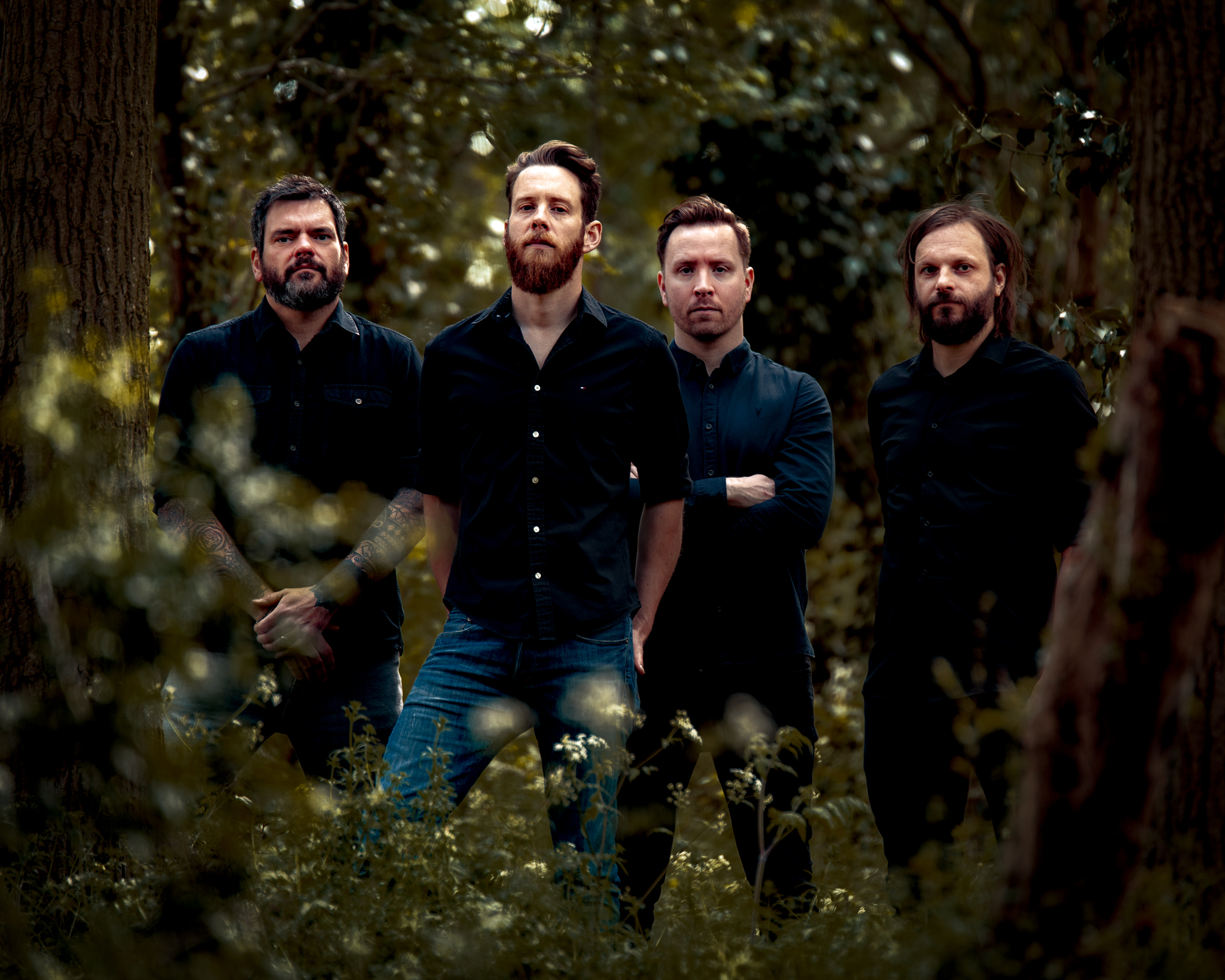
- PSOTY in April 2019. From left to right: Steve McKenna, Dale Vinten, Scott Gowan and Adrian Lawson.

Background information
- Also known as: P S O T Y; Pet Slimmers of the Year
- Origin: Peterborough, Cambridgeshire, England
- Genres: Post-metal; post-rock
- Works: PSOTY discography
- Years active: 2008–present (on hiatus since 2019)
- Labels: Abridged Pause; Anchor; Back on Black; Candlelight; Lost Children; Rowdy Farrago; Silent Flow; Spinefarm; Universal
- Members: Scott Gowan; Steve McKenna; Dale Vinten; Adrian Lawson

PSOTY (originally known as Pet Slimmers of the Year) are an English post-metal/post-rock band from Peterborough, Cambridgeshire. The musical group was founded in January 2008, by guitarist and vocalist Scott Gowan, bass guitarist Steve McKenna, and drummer Dale Vinten, who had previously played together in the progressive/post-rock band A Thousand Fires. Second guitarist Adrian Lawson joined the band in October 2016. The band took its name from an annual award listed in the Schott's Almanac reference book. In August 2014, the band's named was shortened to the acronym PSOTY, taken from the initials of Pet Slimmers of the Year.

After recording a couple of demos (later released as the EP Why Won't You Die), the band released its eponymous EP in January 2009, followed by the ...And the Sky Fell EP in June 2010, both on the British netlabel Lost Children Net Label. Both Lost Children Net Label EPs were later re-issued on CDs by the band. Pet Slimmers of the Year contributed the exclusive song "Brujas" to the Canadian record label Abridged Pause Recordings' Various Artists compilation Diluvian Temperals, which was released in August 2009. The band later contributed another exclusive song, "Untitled," to Abridged Pause Recordings' Various Artists compilation Billowing Tempestus.

In August 2013, Pet Slimmers of the Year released the single "Days Since I Disappeared" through Anchor Music, on the strength of which the band was signed to a three-album deal by British extreme metal record label Candlelight Records. The song later appeared on the record label's Various Artists compilation Candlelight Records Presents: Legion III, released in April 2014. The band's debut full-length album, Fragments of Uniforms, was first released as a limited edition CD through Anchor Music in October 2013, before it was officially released via Candlelight Records on CD and digitally in April 2014. A coloured double-LP version followed on Back on Black Records in June 2014.

In 2016, PSTOY joined the Spinefarm Records and Universal Music Group roster, and followed up with its sophomore full-length album, Sunless, released on CD, double-LP and digitally in September 2019. The album was preceded by the singles "Oil Blood", released in July 2019, and "King of Ephyra", released a week ahead of the album in September 2019.

Due to the band members living in various countries of Europe at the time Sunless was released (and during its composition), and with the outbreak of the COVID-19 pandemic shortly afterward, PSOTY was unable to tour and only played a single concert to promote the album. The album-release show was held at the Nambucca in London on 7 December 2019. It remains the band's most recent live event, and the band has been put on hold since then.

== Members ==
- Scott Gowan - guitar, vocals (2008–present)
- Steve McKenna - bass guitar (2008–present)
- Dale Vinten - drums (2008–present)
- Adrian Lawson - guitar (2016–present)

== Discography ==
Studio albums

- Fragments of Uniforms (Anchor/Candlelight/Back on Black, 2013)
- Sunless (Candlelight/Spinefarm/Universal, 2019)

EPs

- Why Won't You Die (self-released, 2008)
- Pet Slimmers of the Year (Lost Children, 2009)
- ...And the Sky Fell (Lost Children, 2010)
