= Pink Mammoth (EP) =

EP by Pelican
- Released: September 11, 2007
- Recorded: 2006
- Genre: Post-metal
- Length: 15:01
- Label: Hydra Head Records (HH666-113)

Pelican chronology
City of Echoes (2007)	Pink Mammoth (2007)	After the Ceiling Cracked (2008)

Pink Mammoth is the third EP by American post-metal band Pelican, released in 2007 by Hydra Head Records.

The title track is a major key version of "Mammoth" from Pelican's debut EP, and the b-side "End of Seasons" is a remix/mashup from Prefuse 73 of "Aurora Borealis" and the untitled track from The Fire in Our Throats Will Beckon the Thaw.

== Track listing ==
1. "Pink Mammoth" – 6:28
2. "End of Seasons (Prefuse 73 remix)" – 8:33
