= Nighttime Stories =

2019 studio album by Pelican

Studio album by Pelican
- Released: June 7, 2019
- Studio: Electrical Audio and Decade Music Studios in Chicago, Illinois
- Genre: Post-metal
- Length: 44:29
- Label: Southern Lord (LORD270)

Pelican chronology
The Cliff (2015)	Nighttime Stories (2019)	Flickering Resonance (2025)

Singles from Nighttime Stories
- 1. "Midnight and Mescaline" Released: 11 April 2019

Nighttime Stories is the sixth studio album by American post-metal band Pelican. The album was released on June 7, 2019, through Southern Lord Records. In April 2019, Pelican released the song "Midnight and Mescaline" as a digital and 7-inch single.

== Background ==
The band members lived in Chicago and Los Angeles at this time which required scheduling of group performances. Among various methods used in writing the music on the album the band used the online file storage hosting service Dropbox to store song ideas and guitar riffs. Using this method for a long period of time led guitarist Trevor de Brauw to think that he was left out of the writing process for the track "Full Moon, Black Water" which was arranged by guitarist Dallas Thomas and drummer Larry Herweg into a complete song. He later learned that some of the riffs were written by him and stored in the bands dropbox account and were used by Thomas to compose the song.

De Brauw and Herweg were in an experimental grind band Tusk which the band used as an inspiration for the style of playing used on Nighttime Stories after their former bandmember Jody Minnoch suddenly died from an undiagnosed heart condition. This led them to reviewing the music of Tusk and using its influence within the context of Pelican's current lineup. They wrote more extreme grind passages using metal and punk's, "discordant and aggressive playing style". An example being the track "Midnight and Mescaline" which de Brauw described as using D.C. hardcore drum patterns and rhythms. The single also contained the unreleased B-side track "Darkness on the Stairs" which was also officially released on the album "B-Sides and Other Rarities" with all sales going to the charity Color of Change.

Going through their fallen bandmates notes and looking for song title ideas they used one passage which became the name of the track "It Stared at Me" which was described by de Brau as being musically inspired by John Carpenter’s ambient styled In the Mouth of Madness soundtrack consisting of "laid back" drum beats layered with "slide guitar and the electric piano". Nighttime Stories which became the album title and title track was also from their former bandmate as it was going to be used as the title of a future Tusk album.

Although the band stopped using Pelican as their primary source of income Nighttime Stories resulted in their first charting album on the Rock and Metal albums chart. After founding guitarist Laurent Schroeder-Lebec left the band Dallas Thomas joined as a touring guitarist. He made his first sole written Pelican contribution on the Nighttime Stories album starting with the first track, "W.S.T". This was also using the theme of the band deriving inspiration from lost associates with "W.S.T" being "a tribute to his late father".

== Equipment ==
Explaining the importance of using loud volume music equipment de Brauw shared how "a lot of the old Pelican records were written on acoustic guitar" and that "now I find trying to write songs on acoustic or even low volume electric to be stifling. I think I'm so used to Pelican as a live entity I need to feel that volume to drive the riffs." Thomas added that "volume and dynamics play a big part" in writing and recording the bands current music. In addition to the louder live performance level volume to achieve the bands heavy sound they also use lower guitar tunings including the B tuning and heavier string gauges in the range of .013–.056. Thomas spoke of a variation of the B tuning stating "sometimes Bryan will write songs in a drop B tuning, but if he doesn't play guitar we'll just transpose it to B standard to not bore the crowd with extra tuning, but it does result in some awkward fingerings".

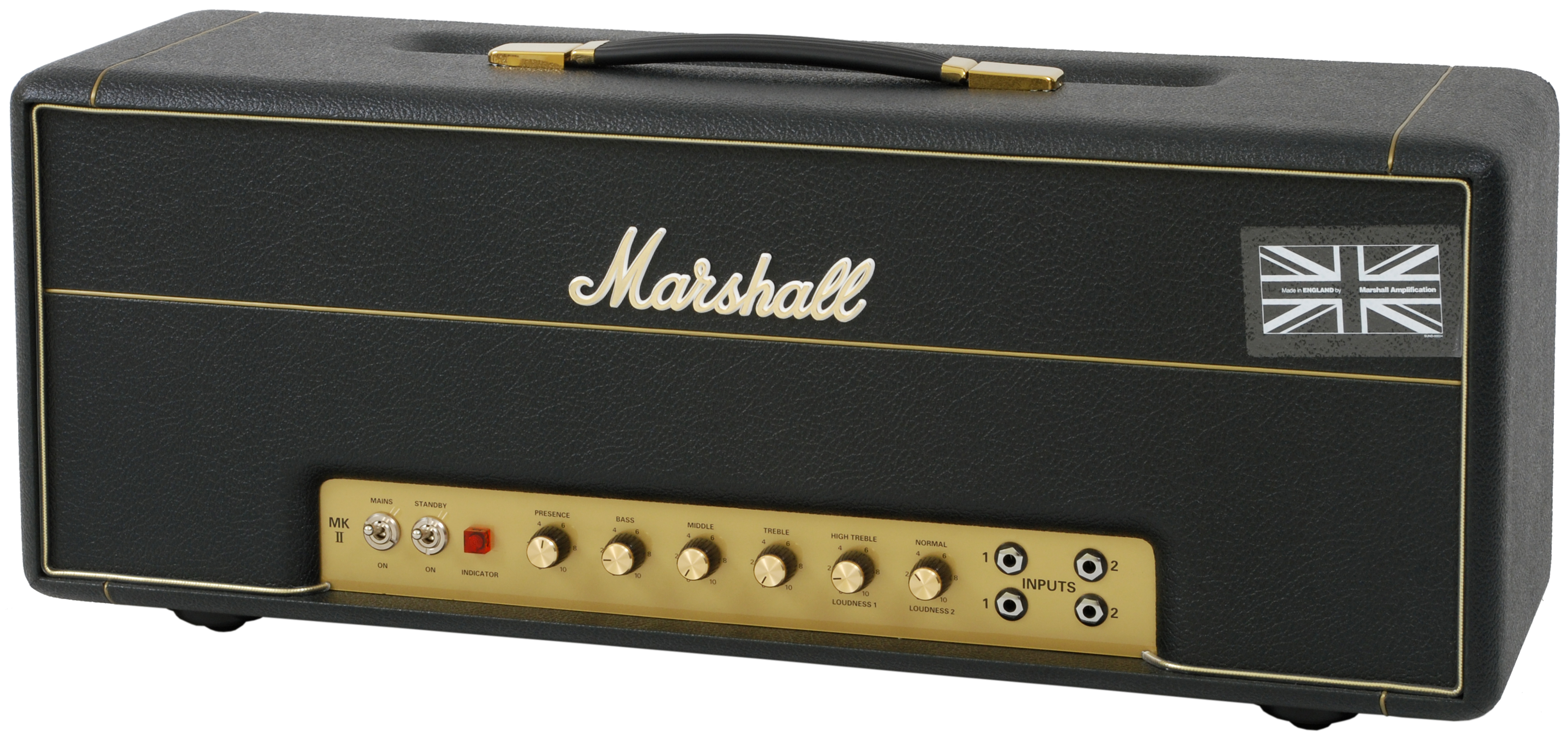
A Marshall Plexi guitar amp

In an interview about musical gear used live at the time and to record the album Dallas Thomas said his main guitar amp was a Marshall Plexi 100W Reissue that formerly belonged to Peter Frampton and a Soldano or Bogner overdrive and distortion pedal. For guitars he used a custom made guitar which combined "three of his favorite Gibsons into one guitar. The creation is an SG body, Les Paul Custom neck, and a Flying V headstock." This was made by guitar luthier Dave Johnson through his guitar company Scale Model Guitars. The guitar was previously used on Forever Becoming, and the live albums Arktika and Live at Dunk! Fest 2016. It produced its sound through a single ceramic passive guitar pickup with 11k output and a 250k potentiometer. The track "W.S.T" was recorded with his father's Yamaha acoustic guitar.

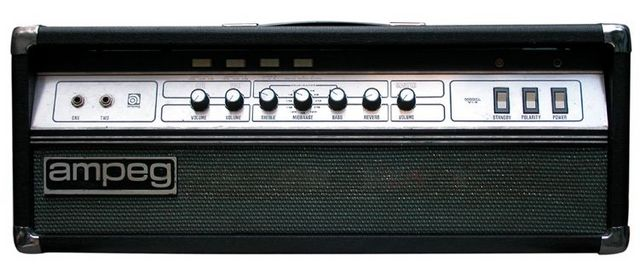
The Ampeg V4 guitar amp

Trevor de Brauw used his historically main guitar being a circa 1971 to 1972 era Gibson SG. Commenting on its longevity and continued use he said "I've been playing the same 1972 Gibson SG since day one in this band. I'll probably play it until it gives out on me." His amplification consisted of an Ampeg V4 through an Emperor 4x12 cabinet. Slightly changing his tones he has begun to use a Pro Co RAT distortion pedal since, "up until very recently I only used tube distortion from my amp".

== Artwork, packaging ==
For the Artwork the band wanted it to represent the origins of the inspiration for the album which was detailed in an interview about it with V13.net. It started out with landscape photography from Andrew Weiss. This was in continuation of the bands artwork creation method which would be to select photographs that they preselect and then use a graphic designer to make the album artwork using them as subject matter. As with their first three albums they used Aaron Turner. They chose these artists because they both had "highly contrasted and eerie" styles of work at the time and "Aaron did the artwork for all three Tusk albums, so it seemed fitting to get him involved in this in terms of tying that thematic continuity." Although they said there was no "specific meaning" behind the artwork they did make "a point to get Aaron the music so he could listen to it and get a sense of the feeling of the album while he worked on the artwork."

== Touring ==
Pelican toured in 2019 to support the album including dates in the United States, Canada, the United Kingdom, and various mainland European countries. In the U.S. they toured with the band Cloakroom. They also toured with Slow Crush for their UK dates.

== Critical reception ==
Professional ratings
Aggregate scores
Source	Rating
Metacritic	82/100
Review scores
Source	Rating
AllMusic	4/5 stars
Chicago Tribune	3.5/4 stars
Decibel	Positive
Exclaim!	8/10
NPR	Positive

Nighttime Stories was met with critical acclaim. The album received an average score of 82/100 from 8 reviews on Metacritic, indicating "universal acclaim". Loudwire said the album was a "bit more direct and hard-hitting than some of their other works". Trevor de Brauw agreed with that observation in that "a lot of the chord voicings and the way the songs are structured are very discordant, and maybe more menacing and negative sounding than Pelican has been in the past."

"Midnight and Mescaline" was the first single released from the album on 11 April 2019. Rolling Stone described it as an almost five minute long song consisting of a beginning part "with a barrage of heavy riffs that run ragged over the ceaseless pummel of the drums". After it seems to reach an end in silence it continues with a different theme "allowing a guttural bass line to take hold and lead the track through an extended breakdown."

The track "Cold Hope" started as a chord progression written by Thomas. De Brauw used this as an example of how once the song was worked on with the other members it showed that, "Pelican is more than a mass of riffs, it’s really made up of the distinct musical interplay of four very unique musicians". Kerrang! noted the track as being a heavier than usual composition from the band consisting of "more psychedelic riffs that keep the track fresh as it progresses." Inspiration for the final part of "Cold Hope" and the middle section of "Abyssal Plain" was taken from Thomas and Herweg's appreciation of Afro Beat and Fela Kuti who would play complex repeating rhythm passages which they used as a songwriting technique to see "how much mileage they could get out of one part or riff just using repetition." In an interview question about the track with Kerrang! de Brauw said about the bands initial performing the song together that, "we jammed the end-section for about 10 or 12 minutes, and then it was just a case of, how do we scale this back and get it under control?"

In addition to releasing the track as a single they coincided it with a craft beer release of the same name produced by the Chicago-based Metropolitan Brewing brewery. Pelican's reasoning of working with the brewery was that they both had the same artistic goals of creating limited amounts of quality creations. "Metropolitan's brewing output is limited due to the fact that they only brew lagers, which take much longer to brew than ales and therefore tie up the capacity of their equipment," as opposed to mass production and producing "things that might be more immediately profitable." Favorable receptions were given for both the song and the lager with the song being referred to as an "icy crusher" by Consequence of Sound. In review of the beer the Chicago Reader wrote that it "tastes as lush as a cinnamon bun at first, but it finishes dry and mineral, which keeps it from fatiguing your palate."

In contrast to the more complex song structures the album also contained tracks that were shorter with a distinct catchiness found in the bass and drum focused "Midnight And Mescaline" and musical funk passages in "Abyssal Plain". NPR in review of the album brought out the vocal emulation of the longest track of the album, "Full Moon, Black Water" as "it's as lyrical in its own way as any singer-songwriter confessional - only in Pelican's case, screeches of feedback and electronically-treated textures take the place of cries and whispers". AllMusic also agreed with the track capturing all the themes explored on the album with it being its "funereal best, administering sonic hospice to a world that's grown too tired to claw its way out of the abyss".

== Track listing ==
No.	Title	Length
1.	"WST"	3:11
2.	"Midnight and Mescaline"	4:56
3.	"Abyssal Plain"	4:48
4.	"Cold Hope"	6:57
5.	"It Stared at Me"	3:22
6.	"Nighttime Stories"	6:35
7.	"Arteries of Blacktop"	6:33
8.	"Full Moon, Black Water"	8:01
Total length:		44:29

== Personnel ==
Credits adapted from Nighttime Stories liner notes

Pelican

- Trevor de Brauw – guitar
- Bryan Herweg – bass
- Larry Herweg – drums
- Dallas Thomas – guitar

Additional personnel

- Aaron Turner – artwork and layout
- Andrew Weiss – photography
- Ed Brooks – mastering
- Matt Bayles – mixing
- Sanford Parker – recording

== Charts ==
Chart (2019)	Peak position
UK Rock & Metal Albums (OCC)	37
