= The Cliff (EP) =

EP by Pelican
- Released: February 24, 2015
- Studio: Electrical Audio (Chicago, Illinois); Infrasonic Sound (Los Angeles, California)
- Genre: Post-metal
- Length: 24:40
- Label: Southern Lord Records (LORD205)
- Producer: Sanford Parker, Aaron Harris

Pelican chronology
Forever Becoming (2013)	The Cliff (2015)	Nighttime Stories (2019)

The Cliff is the sixth EP by American post-metal band Pelican, released through Southern Lord Records on February 24, 2015. Despite Pelican being a predominantly instrumental band, two of the EP's four tracks feature vocals.

The Cliff was released digitally, as a standard 12-inch vinyl, and as an orange vinyl limited to 1,000 copies.

== Content ==
The Cliff features three altered versions of its title track, which originated from Pelican's 2013 studio album, Forever Becoming. The first of these versions is "The Cliff" with vocals by Allen Epley, who had previously provided his voice on the closing track of Pelican's 2009 album, What We All Come to Need. The second track is a remix by Godflesh frontman and Pelican inspiration Justin Broadrick. Jeremy Ulrey of Metal Injection said about this remix, "Broadrick in particular makes the song his own, stripping out the vocals and leaving behind a skeletal drone that sounds like a dead ringer for his own act, Jesu." The third song is a remix of "The Cliff" by Aaron Harris and Bryant Clifford Meyer of Palms. The EP's closing track is a Pelican original entitled "The Wait".

== Critical reception ==
Professional ratings
Review scores
Source	Rating
Drowned in Sound	7/10
Metal Injection	Average
Pitchfork	6.7/10
Under the Radar	7.5/10 stars

The Cliff was met with somewhat positive reception. Zoe Camp of Pitchfork considered the EP an interesting experiment that hinted at a more melodic, vocally-driven Pelican. Writing for Metal Injection, Jeremy Ulrey said, "it's a fairly disposable addition to the catalog. The key selling point of this release is the original studio mix of "The Cliff", with the remainder of the EP being non-essential lagniappe. Which is kind of what EPs have historically been anyway." Joseph Rowan of Drowned in Sound said that The Cliff may only be for devoted listeners, but that it was a worthwhile experiment that should please fans. Under the Radar's John Srebalus wrote, "The Cliff works as an expertly curated maxi-single, but also as a top-to-bottom journey in inspiration, purpose, and emotional resonance."

== Track listing ==
No.	Title	Length
1.	"The Cliff" (Vocal version)	4:03
2.	"The Cliff" (Justin Broadrick remix)	8:27
3.	"The Cliff" (Palms remix)	6:08
4.	"The Wait"	6:01
Total length:		24:40

== Personnel ==
Credits adapted from liners notes.

Pelican

- Trevor de Brauw – guitar
- Dallas Thomas – guitar
- Bryan Herweg – bass
- Larry Herweg – drums

Additional musicians

- Allen Epley – vocals (1, 3)
- Justin Broadrick – remixing (2)
- Aaron Harris – remixing (3), drums (4)
- Bryant Clifford Meyer – remixing (3)
- Sanford Parker – guitars (4)

Technical personnel

- Gregoir Yechen – assistant engineering
- Jon San Paolo – assistant engineering
- Mika Jussila – mastering
- Andrew Weiss – photography
- Chris Common – mixing, recording
