= Flickering Resonance =

2025 studio album by Pelican

Studio album by Pelican
- Released: May 16, 2025
- Studios: Narwhal Studios in Chicago, Illinois
- Genre: Post-metal
- Length: 51:12
- Label: Run for Cover

Pelican chronology
| Nighttime Stories (2019) | Flickering Resonance (2025) | Ascending (2026) |

Singles from Flickering Resonance
- 1. "Cascading Crescent" Released: February 12, 2025; 2. "Indelible" Released: March 18, 2025; 3. "Pining For Ever" Released: April 22, 2025; 4. "Gulch" Released: May 13, 2025

Flickering Resonance is the seventh studio album by American post-metal band Pelican. The album was released on May 16, 2025 through Run for Cover Records.

== Background ==
In 2022, guitarist Dallas Thomas left the band and Pelican announced founding guitarist Laurent Schroeder-Lebec would return for live performances later in the year. Thus, Flickering Resonance marks Pelican's first studio album to include Schroeder-Lebec since 2009's What We All Come to Need and first release since 2012's Ataraxia/Taraxis. On February 12, 2025, Pelican announced that their seventh studio album, entitled Flickering Resonance, would be released on May 16 and also released the album's first single "Cascading Crescent". On March 18, 2025, the band released the second single "Indelible", followed by "Pining For Ever" on April 22 and "Gulch" on May 13.

== Touring ==
Pelican toured in 2025 to support the album including dates in the United States, Canada, Germany, the Netherlands, United Kingdom, and France. In the first leg of the tour in March, they toured with the band Russian Circles. They also toured with Porcelain for their July dates.

== Track listing ==
| No. | Title | Length |
|---|---|---|
| 1. | "Gulch" | 2:47 |
| 2. | "Evergreen" | 6:06 |
| 3. | "Indelible" | 7:06 |
| 4. | "Specific Resonance" | 8:22 |
| 5. | "Cascading Crescent" | 4:24 |
| 6. | "Pining For Ever" | 7:00 |
| 7. | "Flickering Stillness" | 7:00 |
| 8. | "Wandering Mind" | 8:07 |
| Total length: | | 51:12 |

== Personnel ==
Credits adapted from Flickering Resonance liner notes

Pelican

- Trevor de Brauw – guitar
- Bryan Herweg – bass
- Larry Herweg – drums
- Laurent Schroeder-Lebec – guitar

Additional personnel

- Sanford Parker – recording
- Scott Evans – mixing
- Matthew Barnhart – mastering
- Christian Degn Petersen – artwork
