= Sunless (album) =

2019 studio album by PSOTY

Studio album by PSOTY
- Released: 13 September 2019
- Recorded: 25 February 2019 – March 2019
- Studio: Bandit Studios, Cotswold, Gloucestershire, England
- Genre: Post-metal; post-rock
- Length: 55:27
- Label: Candlelight; Spinefarm; Universal
- Producer: Jonny Renshaw

PSOTY chronology
Fragments of Uniforms (2013)	Sunless (2019)

Singles from Sunless
- 1. "Oil Blood" Released: 26 July 2019; 2. "King of Ephyra" Released: 6 September 2019

Sunless is the second full-length album by English post-metal/post-rock band PSOTY. It was co-released by Candlelight Records, Spinefarm Records, and Universal Music Group on 13 September 2019, on compact disc, double 12-inch vinyl, and digitally. The album features the singles "Oil Blood", which was released on 26 July 2019, and "King of Ephyra", which was released a week ahead of the album on 6 September 2019.

The album was written and recorded with guitarist and vocalist Scott Gowan, bass guitarist Steve McKenna, drummer Dale Vinten, and guitarist Adrian Lawson. Sunless was tracked during February and March 2019, with producer Jonny Renshaw at Bandit Studios, where the band had also recorded its debut full-length, Fragments of Uniforms, six years prior.

It is the band's first release under its abbreviated name, PSOTY, as it was officially shortened from Pet Slimmers of the Year in August 2014. It is also the band's first release as a four-piece, as second guitarist Adrian Lawson joined the line-up in October 2016.

Due to its members living in various countries of Europe at the time of the album's release (and during its composition), and with the outbreak of the COVID-19 pandemic shortly afterward, PSOTY was unable to tour and only played a single concert to promote Sunless. The album-release show was held at the Nambucca in London on 7 December 2019; as of 2024, it remains the band's most recent live event.

== Background ==
=== Writing and recording ===
Following the re-release of the band's debut full-length album, Fragments of Uniforms, via English record label Candlelight Records in April 2014, Pet Slimmers of the Year slowly began composing new material for its follow-up release. In August 2014, the band's name was shortened to the acronym PSOTY, as the group felt it had outgrown its comical origin.

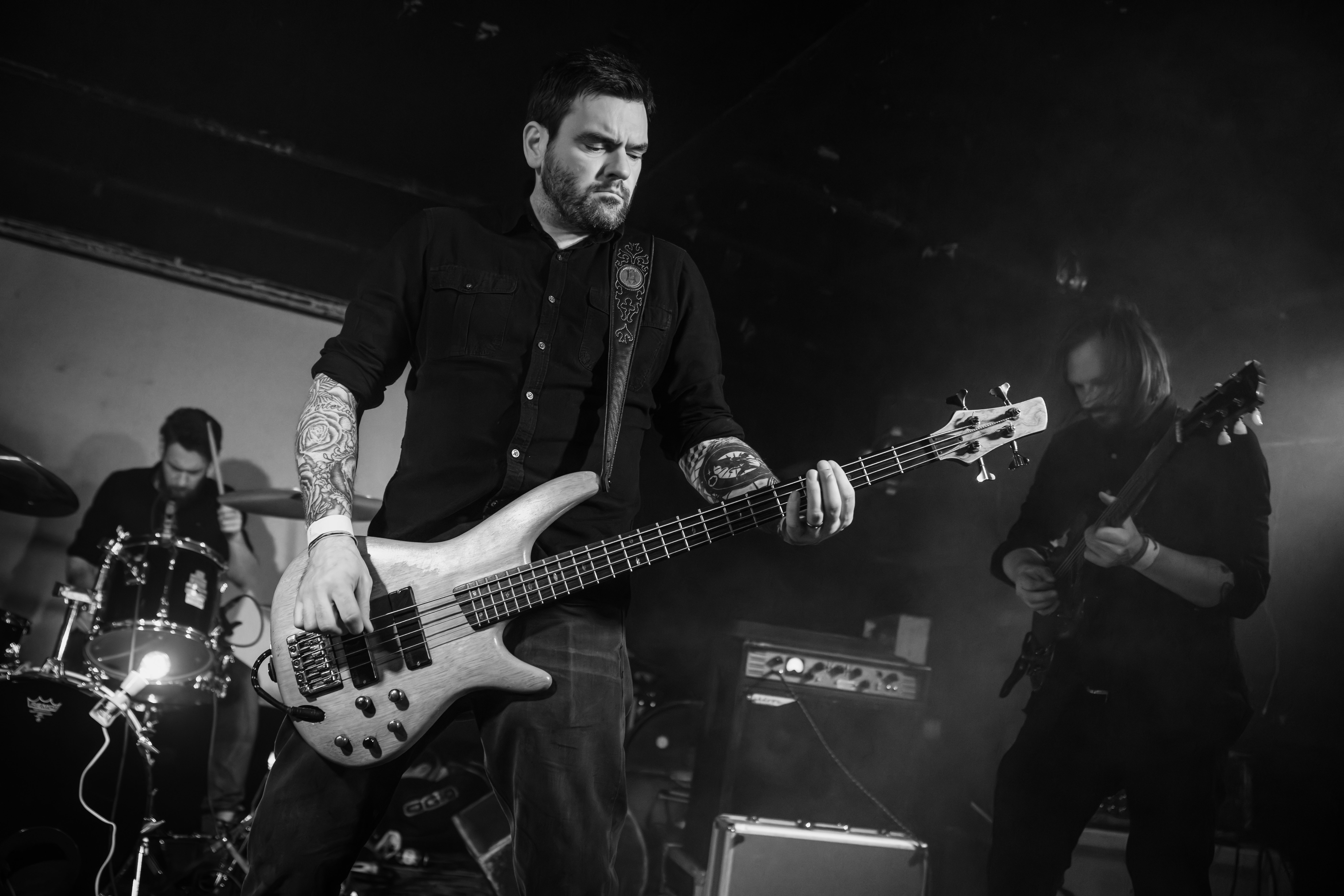
PSOTY performing at the 9 Years of Chaos Festival at Electrowerkz in London, England on 2 February 2019. From left to right: Dale Vinten, Steve McKenna, and Adrian Lawson.

In January 2016, the band joined the Finnish record label Spinefarm Records and the Dutch-American corporation Universal Music Group roster, when Candlelight Records' assets were purchased by Spinefarm Music Group. That same month, PSOTY announced that it was working on a new extended play, which it hoped to release before the end of the year. However, Candlelight Records and Spinefarm Records insisted that the band instead focus on writing another full-length album. The band later said of the song "Oil Blood": "This was the first track we wrote for this record. We originally demoed this in 2016 and, once we’d got the vocals in place, we felt that this had to be the opening track for the record. Little did we know at the time that it would set the tone for entire album and push us forward in the direction we wanted to go with our sound."

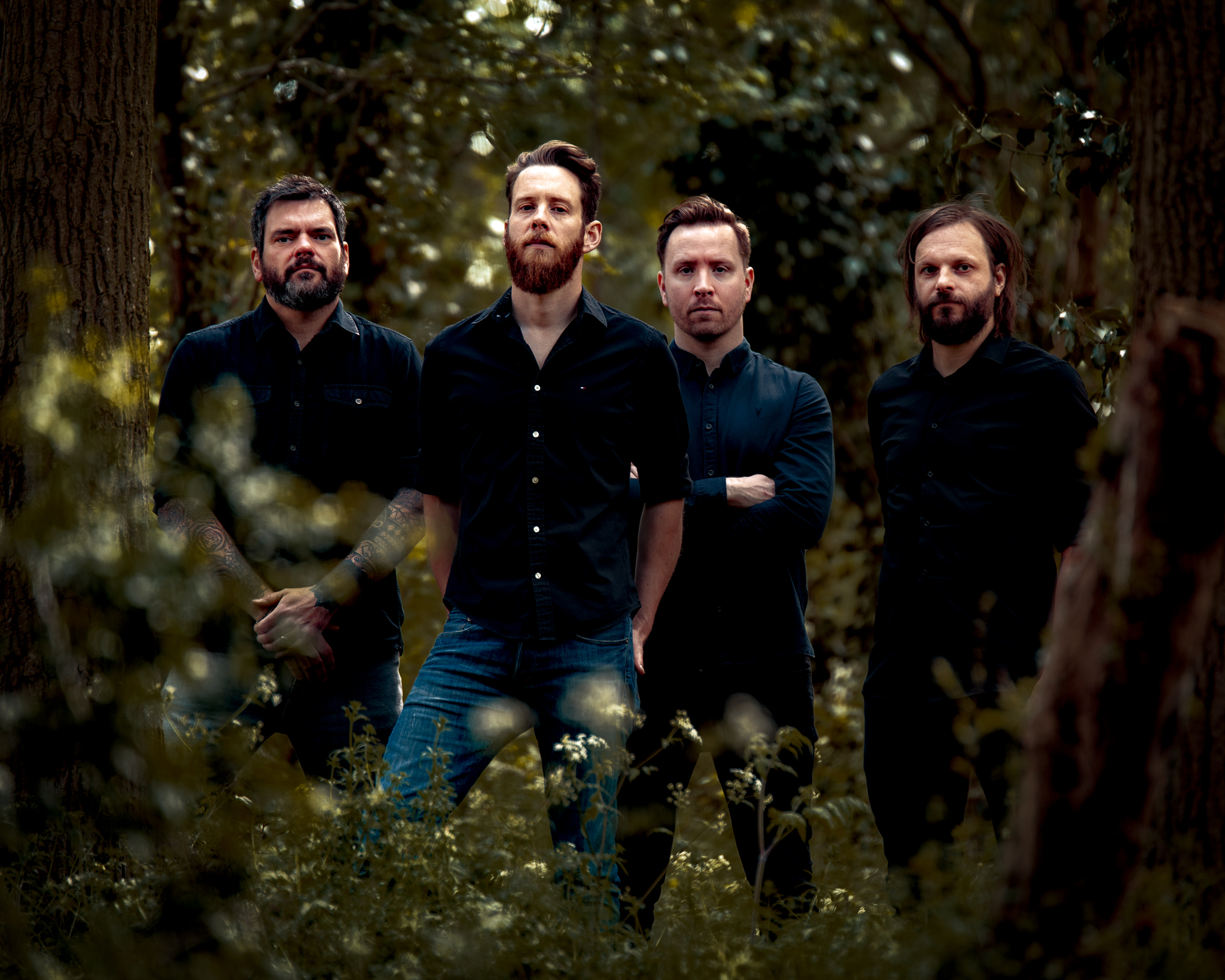
Publicity picture of PSOTY taken on 25 April 2019, in promotion of Sunless. From left to right: Steve McKenna, Dale Vinten, Scott Gowan, and Adrian Lawson.

In October 2016, the band recruited second guitarist Adrian Lawson, a resident of Mansfield, England. The other three founding members, vocalist and guitarist Scott Gowan, bass guitarist Steve McKenna, and drummer Dale Vinten, all originally resided in Peterborough, England, but Gowan had since relocated to London, England. Vinten would eventually move to Neuilly-le-Vendi, France, which factored in the extended delay of members getting together to complete the album.

By October 2018, the band had demoed all of its material and a two-week session was booked at Bandit Studios in Cotswold, England, where PSOTY had recorded Fragments of Uniforms six years prior. Starting 25 February 2019, and into early March, the band recorded eight songs for its sophomore full-length album, Sunless. As with Fragments of Uniforms, PSOTY described Sunless as a concept album: "There is an overarching theme – We took a mythological angle and played on a couple of concepts to relate to the human existence we’re all party to – Struggle, greed, failure, self-doubt." Immediately prior to entering the studio, PSOTY played its first show in nearly two years, on 2 February 2019, as part of the 9 Years of Chaos Festival, held at the Electrowerkz in London.

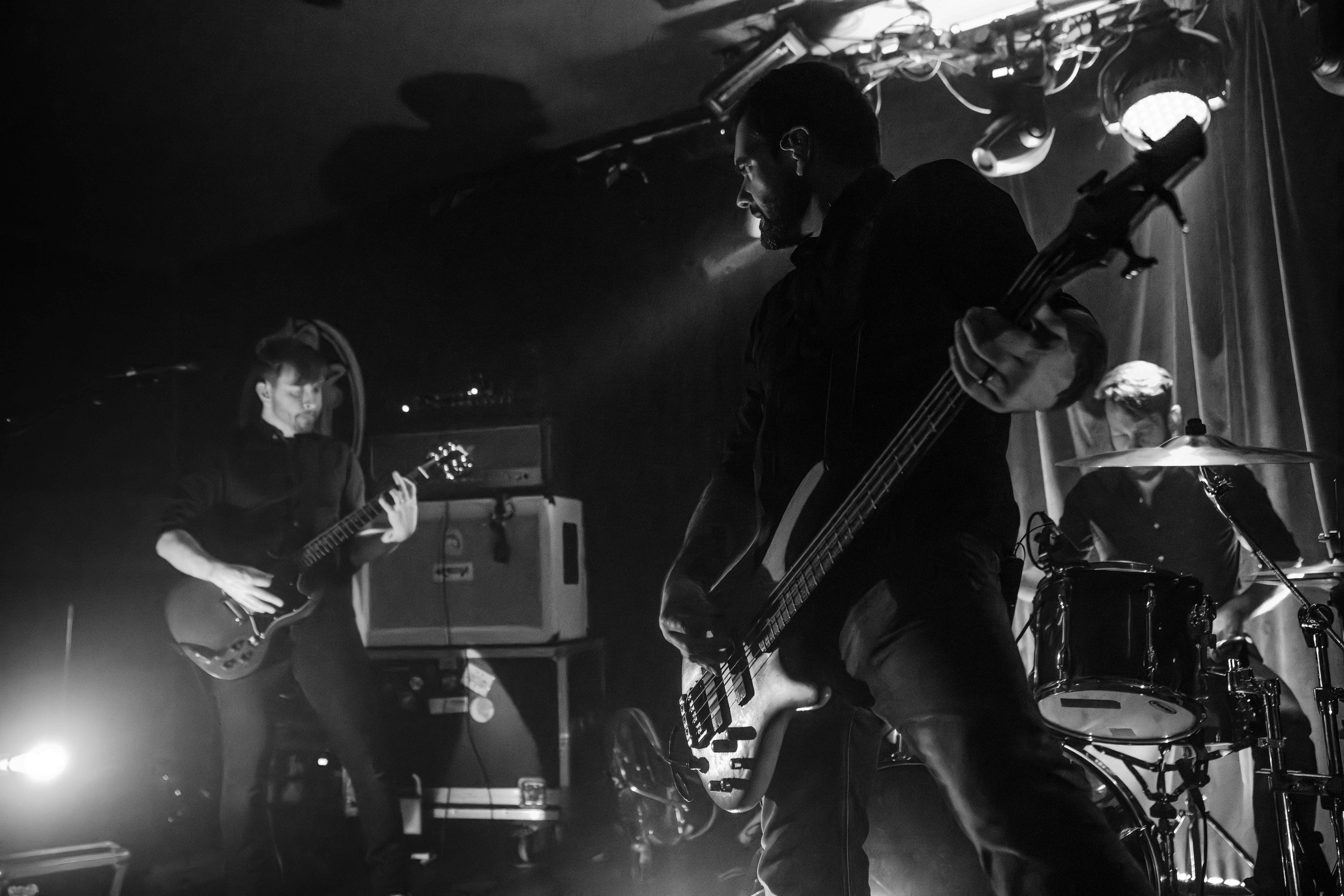
PSOTY performing at Nambucca in London, England on 7 December 2019. From left to right: Scott Gowan, Steve McKenna, and Dale Vinten.

=== Release and promotion ===
Sunless was revealed to the press on 26 July 2019, simultaneously with the release of the lead single "Oil Blood". A second single, "King of Ephyra", was released a week ahead of the album on 6 September 2019. Sunless was released on compact disc, double-12-inch vinyl and digitally on 13 September 2019. The band again commissioned designer Asim Salman, who had worked on Fragments of Uniforms, to design the album's artwork and layout.

PSOTY announced a desire to tour in promotion of the release, but due to its members living in various countries of Europe at the time, and with the outbreak of the COVID-19 pandemic shortly afterward, the band was unable to do so and only played a single concert to promote Sunless. The album-release show was held at the Nambucca in London on 7 December 2019; as of 2024, it remains the band's most recent live event.

== Critical reception and recognition ==
Professional ratings
Review scores
Source	Rating
Ave Noctum	8/10 stars
Blabbermouth	7.5/10 stars
Distorted Sound	8/10 stars
Guitar Noodle	9.5/10 stars
Metal Hammer	7/10 stars
Metal Heads Forever	7/10 stars
PlanetMosh	5/5 stars
Rock Hard	6/10 stars

PSOTY and Sunless received overall positive reception upon release. Musik3000 included the album in its list Top 3 Albums of the Week in September 2019, while No Clean Singing included it on its list Best British of 2019 in October 2019. Echoes and Dust ranked Sunless No. 7 on its year-end list Records of the Year 2019, New Noise Magazine ranked it No. 9 on its year-end list Best of 2019, and Moderate Rock ranked it No. 10 on its year-end list Albums of the Year – 2019.

Stylistically, the album was categorized as more post-metal and less post-rock than the band's earlier releases, which had been described as having an equal mix of both genres. Mark Smith of Guitar Noodle opined "Post metal? Post rock? I don’t know, they don’t seem to fit neatly into a single genre." Matt Speer of Ear Nutrition wrote that the band's earlier albums had a "symbiotic relationship" between the genres and were mostly instrumental, and he stated that Sunless "follows none of these rules and polarizes the band’s sound", calling it "stripped down and cumbersome in more traditional post-metal sonic-mass". Dom Lawson of Blabbermouth saw the album as a shift from "riff-driven slow-build with a side order of post-rock's prettiness" to something "less abstract and far more direct". Lawson credited the band with "blurring lines between micro-subgenres with the zeal of true explorers".

Several journalists also labeled the band as progressive metal, with others leaning towards sludge metal, doom metal, funeral doom metal, alternative metal, and space metal. The album's cleaner sections were also identified as ambient, ethereal, and dark post-rock.

When compared to other band's music, critics most often conjured the names of Isis, Neurosis, Tool, Deftones, Palms, and Baroness. Similarities were also drawn to Pink Floyd, Pelican, Opeth, Mogwai, Martin Grech, Herod, Black Peaks, Cave In, Devil Sold His Soul, Callisto, Cloudkicker, Tesseract, Oh Hiroshima, Red Sparowes, Leprous, Muse, Dead Letter Circus, Karnivool, Russian Circles, Cult of Luna, Between the Buried and Me, Devin Townsend Project, Junius, Thrice, Nordic Giants, Bossk, Amenra, Cocteau Twins, Mithras, and Dumbsaint.

Simon T. Diplock of New Noise Magazine called it "a post-metal treasure that’s a rare balance of power and emotion, depth and darkness". Nick Griffiths of Ave Noctum praised the album's scope and production, and Carl Fisher of Games, Brrraaains & a Head-Banging Life commended its scope and depth. In his review, Nick Cusworth of Heavy Blog Is Heavy called the band underrated after a decade of quality output.

Maria Tricker of Distorted Sounds considered the band promising since its debut album, and she said they "have outdone themselves with Sunless, a post-metal beauty". Mark Martins of Echoes and Dust also described the album as a genre-bender and said it "shows us a band at their peak of creativity". Stephen Hill of Metal Hammer felt the band was starting to perform at the level of its influences, heading toward "post-metal nirvana".

Shaun Milligan of Everything Is Noise appreciated individual tracks, though he felt the album "far best digested as a whole". Nedim Hassan of Get into This urged audiences to listen to it repeatedly, calling it a "mesmeric, panoramic experience". Islander of No Clean Singing approved of the album being "an atypical example of post-metal" and labeled it a "real gem" in an "often overcrowded and oversubscribed" sub-genre.

== Track listing ==
Credits are adapted from the album's liner notes. All music by Gowan, McKenna, Vinten, and Lawson.

Sunless track listing
No.	Title	Length
1.	"Oil Blood"	8:02
2.	"The Yawning Void"	7:06
3.	"Watcher of the Abyss"	10:14
4.	"Acheron"	3:21
5.	"Queen of Hades"	7:59
6.	"Charon"	2:24
7.	"King of Ephyra"	8:12
8.	"Obscura"	8:09
Total length:		55:27

== Personnel ==
Credits are adapted from the album's liner notes.

PSOTY

- Scott Gowan – vocals, guitar
- Steve McKenna – bass guitar
- Dale Vinten – drums
- Adrian Lawson – guitar

Production

- Jonny Renshaw – recording engineer, mixer, producer and mastering engineer at Bandit Studios
- Asim Salman – artwork and layout
- Darren Toms – A&R at Candlelight Records

== Release history ==
Release formats for Sunless
Region	Date	Label	Format	Catalog
Worldwide	13 September 2019	Candlelight Records / Spinefarm Records / Universal Music Group	Digital	CANDLE788147
Worldwide	13 September 2019	Candlelight Records / Spinefarm Records / Universal Music Group	Double LP	CANDLE788148
Worldwide	13 September 2019	Candlelight Records / Spinefarm Records / Universal Music Group	CD	CANDLE788149
