= Fragments of Uniforms =

2013 studio album by Pet Slimmers of the Year

Studio album by Pet Slimmers of the Year
- Released: 31 October 2013
- Recorded: April 2012, June 2013
- Studio: Bandit Studios, Cotswold, Gloucestershire, England
- Genre: Post-metal; post-rock
- Length: 50:18
- Label: Anchor; Back on Black; Candlelight
- Producer: Jonny Renshaw

Pet Slimmers of the Year chronology
...And the Sky Fell (2010)	Fragments of Uniforms (2013)	Sunless (2019)

Singles from Fragments of Uniforms
- 1. "Days Since I Disappeared" Released: 26 August 2013

Fragments of Uniforms is the debut full-length album by English post-metal/post-rock band Pet Slimmers of the Year. It was originally released by Anchor Music on compact disc on 31 October 2013; it was later re-issued by Candlelight Records on compact disc and digitally on 14 April 2014 (in the United Kingdom and Europe), and on 6 May 2014 (in North America); and by Back on Black Records on double 12-inch vinyl on 23 June 2014.

The album was written and recorded with guitarist and vocalist Scott Gowan, bass guitarist Steve McKenna, and drummer Dale Vinten, and tracked during two sessions in 2012 and 2013, with producer Jonny Renshaw at Bandit Studios. It is the band's final release under its original name, Pet Slimmers of the Year, as it would be officially abbreviated to PSOTY in August 2014. It is also the band's final release as a three-piece, as second guitarist Adrian Lawson joined the line-up in October 2016.

The album features the single "Days Since I Disappeared", which was first issued by Anchor Music on 26 August 2013, and later re-issued by Candlelight Records on 13 January 2014. Other songs, like "Churning of the Sea of Milk" and "Mare Imbrium", were used in digital promotions, but had no music videos. In promotion of the release, Pet Slimmers of the Year performed at such music festivals as Candlefest (held at the Camden Underworld), and ArcTanGent Festival.

== Background ==
=== Writing and recording ===
Early in 2012, Pet Slimmers of the Year signed with Adam Mortaro's music management company, Adequate Management. The band was at the time already working on a five-song extended play, which it hoped to release later in 2012. Mortaro pushed the band to write additional material, schedule time at more professional recording studio facilities, and book larger shows to showcase the music.

In April 2012, the band entered Bandit Studios in Cotswold, Gloucestershire to record the song "Days Since I Disappeared" with record producer Jonny Renshaw (of the bands Mahumodo and Devil Sold His Soul). Although the song was scheduled to appear on the forthcoming extended play, Mortaro felt that it would be beneficial to issue it as a lead single, months ahead of the release, which had by then gotten pushed back to early 2013.

The music video for "Days Since I Disappeared" was filmed on 10 November 2012, by director-producer Phil Berridge through his Creative Junkie Media productions company. The short film featured the band's friend and frequent graphic design collaborator, Vincent Drummond, playing the lead role of a German Schutzstaffel officer lost in the woods during World War II. "Days Since I Disappeared" had originally been scheduled for release as a single in mid-2012, but it was continuously delayed while the band focused on writing enough content to upgrade the extended play into a full-length album. Pet Slimmers of the Year ultimately crafted what they described as a "semi-concept album around being lost at sea."

In early 2013, Adequate Management was renamed Anchor Music, when Mortaro started releasing music through the company. Pet Slimmers of the Year eventually returned to Bandit Studios in June 2013, to record seven more songs for its upgraded full-length album. Its title, Fragments of Uniforms, was originally the name of an unreleased song written and demoed during the album session, which itself was inspired from Manic Street Preachers lyrics. With the album coming to completion, Anchor Music finally released "Days Since I Disappeared" as a digital single on 26 August 2013. The music video premiered three days earlier, online via Blank TV, on 23 August 2013.

=== Release and promotion ===
On 10 September 2013, the band ran a poll through its Facebook page, allowing fans to vote on which song would next be unveiled ahead of the album's release. The band offered the choice between "Churning of the Sea of Milk", "Gathering Half the Deep and Full of Voices", or "La Tormenta". On 20 October 2013, the band offered "Churning of the Sea of Milk" as a streaming exclusive to its fans via SoundCloud and YouTube.

Fragments of Uniforms was released as a digipak compact disc, limited to only 50 copies, via Anchor Music on 31 October 2013. The following night, on 1 November 2013, the band played an album-release show, opening for Year of No Light and The Mire, at The Black Heart in Camden Town, London. At the show, the band was approached by Darren Toms, an A&R representative of English extreme metal record label Candlelight Records.

After a couple months of negotiations, the news of the band's signing to Candlelight Records was officially announced to the press on 13 January 2014; "Days Since I Disappeared" was simultaneously re-issued by the record label. The single premiered on BBC Radio 1's programme Rock Show (hosted by Daniel P. Carter) on 18 February 2014, and was later included on Candlelight Records' Various Artists compilation Candlelight Records Presents: Legion III, released on 28 April 2014. On 3 April 2014, the song "Mare Imbrum" was premiered exclusively on New Noise Magazine

The digipak compact disc and digital re-issues of Fragments of Uniforms via Candlelight Records were scheduled for release on 14 April 2014 in the United Kingdom and Europe (distributed via Plastic Head Distribution), and 22 April 2014 in North America (distributed via ManicMusic). However, the North American release date was pushed back to 6 May 2014. The album was also issued as a deluxe transparent red double 12-inch vinyl via Back on Black Records, originally scheduled for 26 May 2014, but delayed until 23 June 2014.

== Critical reception and recognition ==
Professional ratings
Review scores
Source	Rating
Amps and Green Screens	9/10 stars
Ave Noctum	8/10 stars
Bleeding 4 Metal	8/10 stars
Metal.de	7/10 stars
Metal.it	8/10 stars
Metal Hammer	3.5/5 stars
Metal Mouth	Positive
Metal Storm	9/10 stars
Power Metal.de	8.5/10 stars
Sludge Worm	10/10 stars
Terrorizer	Positive

Pet Slimmers of the Year and Fragments of Uniforms received overall positive reception upon release. Metal.it named it Album of the Month for April 2014, while Brain Trust Music included it in its list Top 10 of 2014. It was also singled out in Metal Ireland's best-of-the-year list, Writer's Picks 2014. Candlelight Records was also complimented for signing a band of a genre outside of its usual black and death metal roster. Eric Reese of Amps and Green Screens wrote "This is a band that music enthusiasts of any genre can get hooked on to."

Andy Seibt of Sludge Worm gave the release a 10/10 rating, writing "Complex guitar melodies are woven into a dense construct of emotion, sound and reverie. Driving bass runs secure the underground and are supported by soulful and accentuated drumming. Each instrument contributes its part to the soundscape, adding further nuances to the strong compositions at the most appropriate moments." A critic for Metal Storm rated the album 9/10, and wrote "Their sound ranges from inspired melodic riffs to smooth and glacial clean sections, to a downright sludgy, black abyss. Soft and melancholic guitar passages aid reverbed and textured grunge/alternative sequences that create a truly breathtaking atmosphere. Spacious and cinematic to the end."

Stylistically, the band was universally described as having an even mix of post-metal, and post-rock. Many critics also described the band's genre as sludge metal, doom metal, atmospheric metal, and progressive metal. Some also heard elements of groove metal, post-hardcore, and alternative rock.

J. D. Anderson of Teeth of the Divine stated "Pet Slimmers of the Year have released one of the best post-rock/metal albums I’ve heard in a long time, and it’s thanks in part to incorporation of elements not commonly found in post-rock: clean vocals, a sincere sense of melancholy usually reserved for gothic rock, and a thorough understanding of what makes the post-rock conventions work." Justin Collins of Metal Bandcamp also wrote "The band plays some of the best instrumental rock/metal I've heard in a while. The instrumental parts lean toward the sweeping and majestic, and the vocals are very good, managing to be emotive without being at all saccharine." José Carlos Santos of Terrorizer wrote "Fragments of Uniforms is a powerful work that demands more than idle contemplation: it demands total attention." Madam X of Angry Metal Guy offered "Fragments of Uniforms has the depth and clarity of a modern band, attention to detail and texture and a dynamic range neatly within the range of popular music." Nora-Leonie Mai of Bleeding 4 Metal wrote "Fragments of Uniforms is that kind of post-something, meandering between dreamy guitar layers and groovy basslines – a body of water that initially glitters harmlessly on the surface, only to then, after letting yourself sink in for minutes, washes over you with full heaviness until it pulls you to the bottom. It's an all-round success."

Writing for Metal Hammer, Toby Cook offered "While sticking fairly rigidly to the tried and tested loud/quiet, thunderous/elegant dynamics of the genre, then, here PSOTY have nonetheless created the sort of flowing, textured and oddly unpretentious journey that you hoped that that Palms record would sound like." Andrew Rawlinson of Echoes and Dust wrote "A band that favours creating atmosphere and intensity via cycled patterns and subtlety over using a sledgehammer as any outright heaviness is used sparingly for increased effectiveness to deliver a master class of the genre. Superb production job done by Jonny Renshaw that ensures all the intricacies and developments ring out crystal clear." Ruth Booth of Thrash Hits wrote "There’s a brooding, dream-like quality to Fragments of Uniforms, yet at the same time, it’s inextricably rooted in something more familiar. It’s an emotional hinterland of destinies unfulfilled, and big wild wastes of the night."

Gary Trueman of Metal Mouth opined "With the new album Fragments of Uniforms seeing the Cambridge crew as a more complete and polished unit, I can only wonder at how long it will take before they’re playing the big summer festivals and moving in more exulted circles. The progress they’ve made in just a year or so is staggering. The sound they now produce is mesmerizing, like a musical landscape painted by one of the masters." Thomas Becker of Power Metal.de wrote "The band has a feeling for what is important in their music, they know the rules inside out and always make the right change at exactly the right time, hit the right notes and choose the right volume." Tania Giménez of Queens of Steel thought "Fragments of Uniforms is an emotional journey made with passion and soul. It's well thought out, it's clever, and the composition is sublime, but honest and visceral." Richard Holmes of Rush on Rock wrote "You’ll find some true gems on this debut: the glistening dreamscape of "Tides", is one; the heavier, harder hitting "Mare Imbrium" another." Writing for Sea of Tranquility, Kim Jensen offered "Slow in pace and dark in atmosphere, the tunes on the album build on soft, but melancholic, clean-guitarred passages which are intertwined with crushingly heavy and doom-laden sludgy sections"

Pet Slimmers of the Year's music was often compared to that of Isis. Christian Flack of Metal.de wrote "Pet Slimmers of the Year do an impressive job as the successor to Isis. Fragments of Uniforms is an all-round successful, atmospherically dense album that should convince fans of the deceased US band.", while Simon Clark of The Monolith wrote "The legacy of the sadly defunct post-metal titans Isis unmistakably hangs over Fragments of Uniforms, but PSOTY are far from being a copycat outfit. Their sound feels more like what Isis might be doing now had they not split up and instead continued down the mellower path seen on Wavering Radiant." David Cleland of Metal Irelands also concluded: "The musicianship is solid and understated, weaving soundscapes to draw the listener in with slowly hypnotic rhythms and melodic depth, building all the while to satisfying crescendos. Album closer "La Tormenta" really gives a flavour of what PSOTY are all about – the drums firing on all cylinders, a fantastic & brief vocal performance with an exemplary display of the palette of sounds on offer, rounded out with a crushing end section. Though, in a world without Isis these guys could find their niche – and in some respects the band could pick up where Isis left off, post Wavering Radiant." Jan Müller of Metal1 also wrote "With Fragments of Uniforms Pet Slimmers of the Year present a thoroughly ambitious album that doesn't have to hide from its idols (Neurosis, Cult of Luna and above all Isis) and very obviously doesn't do so."

John Skibeat of Ave Noctum opined "You’d imagine that Pet Slimmers of the Year would have been gracing a major label a lot sooner than January of this year [2014]. Fragments of Uniforms is a work that combines the abundant colours and rich vastness of Pelican’s layering and the melancholic tones and industrial fervour of Russian Circles. Honestly, the album sounds more like finding the middle ground between the twin majesties of Isis and Junius. The flow of the album is exceptional. Fragments of Uniforms is a magnificent, mouthwatering long-player and I for one will be desperate to see how this all translates to the live arena."

Other frequent comparisons were drawn to Cult of Luna, Pelican, and Russian Circles. Some critics also felt the band reminded them of Explosions in the Sky, Junius, Rosetta, Anathema, Porcupine Tree, Neurosis, and Katatonia. The band was also said to have elements of Mogwai, Agalloch, Red Sparowes, Year of No Light, Devin Townsend Project, If These Trees Could Talk, The Ocean, Palms, Oceansize, *shels, Winterfylleth, My Dying Bride, Tool, Crowbar, The Gathering, Pink Floyd, My Bloody Valentine, Latitudes, T.R.A.M., Omega Massif, Stand-Up Guy, and Frames.

== Track listing ==
Credits are adapted from the album's liner notes. All music by Gowan, McKenna and Vinten.

Fragments of Uniforms track listing
No.	Title	Length
1.	"Arterias"	7:27
2.	"Gathering Half the Deep and Full of Voices"	8:29
3.	"Tides"	4:29
4.	"Mare Imbrium"	6:48
5.	"Churning of the Sea of Milk"	5:55
6.	"Days Since I Disappeared"	6:24
7.	"Fragments"	3:22
8.	"La Tormenta"	6:55
Total length:		50:18

== Personnel ==
Credits are adapted from the album's liner notes.

Pet Slimmers of the Year

- Scott Gowan – vocals, guitar
- Steve McKenna – bass guitar
- Dale Vinten – drums

Production

- Jonny Renshaw – recording engineer, mixer, producer and mastering engineer at Bandit Studios
- Asim Salman – artwork and layout
- Darren Toms – A&R at Candlelight Records

== Release history ==
Release formats for Fragments of Uniforms
Region	Date	Label	Format	Catalog
United Kingdom	31 October 2013	Anchor Music	CD	ANCMUS002CD
United Kingdom / Europe	14 April 2014	Candlelight Records	CD	CANDLE449CD
United Kingdom / Europe	14 April 2014	Candlelight Records	Digital	CANDLE449
United States / Canada	6 May 2014	Candlelight Records	CD	CANDLE449CD
United States / Canada	6 May 2014	Candlelight Records	Digital	CANDLE449
United Kingdom	23 June 2014	Back on Black Records	Double LP	BOBV398LP
