= Final Breath =

Final Breath may refer to:

- "Final Breath", a 2022 song by Meghan Trainor from Takin' It Back
- "Final Breath", a 2018 song by Paloma Faith from The Architect
- "Final Breath", a 2009 song by Pelican from What We All Come to Need
