= City of Echoes =

2007 studio album by Pelican

Studio album by Pelican
- Released: June 5, 2007
- Recorded: December 13, 2006, at Electrical Audio, Chicago, Illinois
- Genre: Post-metal, post-rock
- Length: 42:28
- Label: Hydra Head Records (HH666-124)
- Producer: Andrew Schneider

Pelican chronology
The Fire in Our Throats Will Beckon the Thaw (2005)	City of Echoes (2007)	Pink Mammoth (EP) (2007)

City of Echoes is the third studio album by American post-metal band Pelican, released in June 2007 on Hydra Head Records. The album's thematic center is one of globalization; critics received this intention with varying degrees of enthusiasm.

City of Echoes was leaked onto the Internet in early 2007. Five color variations were released for the album's vinyl format. This includes black, silver, translucent blue, clear and black "splatter," and light pink and black "splatter" record designs.

== Theme ==
Guitarist Trevor de Brauw stated that "City of Echoes is moulded by the experience of touring—the title sort of refers to the feeling you get that, although you go to a lot of different places, one of the effects of globalisation is that you see so many similarities from city to city." Speaking on, the band talks about how "you start to see the spread of the Western world, and you think of current events and raging wars for oil, and you start to get hit with how wrong it is to see the golden arches everywhere".

On a more literal level, Laurent Lebec states that "I had no idea where we were going with the music when we started doing these songs [...] [t]he changes were pretty subconscious at first, then looking back we realized what was happening and we just went with it." He continues to add "when we were touring for our last album, The Fire in Our Throats Will Beckon the Thaw, even if we had a 75-minute-long set, we could only play five songs because they were all so long, and that can be tiring for an audience." They are also intent on making it clear that the album is not simply negative in message. "The title also pays tribute to how amazing touring most often feels. It's also a tribute to the joy that burns inside when you reach a place and people who don't speak your language are rooting for your songs and welcoming you into their unique environment".

== Music videos ==
Due in part to the album's shorter song lengths, City of Echoes marks the music video debut of Pelican. Its first release, premiered on May 15, 2008 through the Headbangers Blog, would be for "Dead Between the Walls." Directed by David Kleiler, it was intended as an homage to Kyuss’ "Green Machine" video with "sand, fast cars, blistering colors, and just a focus on rockin’." It features the band performing in a sunny California desert and humorously plays on the concept of their purely instrumental band; as the video reaches the end, a bearded man with a microphone approaches the group and, to his disappointment, stands ready to sing just as the song ends. "Dead Between the Walls" found moderate airplay on Headbangers Ball in 2008.

"Lost in the Headlights" would make for a second video and storyline sequel of sorts to its predecessor. It was shot on the rooftops of downtown LA at night and in the Angeles National Forest by Kenneth Thomas' Scrouge Productions. The video begins with the same bearded man, regarded as "some jackass taking up precious screen time," watching the end of the previous video on a household TV set. Visibly annoyed, he grabs his microphone stand and again begins searching for Pelican. The man searches throughout the video and indeed finds the group but never manages to perform with them. This video debuted on November 13, 2008 on the Headbangers Blog and made its on-air premiere two nights later on Headbangers Ball.

== Reception ==
Professional ratings
Review scores
Source	Rating
Alarm	(Positive)
AllMusic	4/5 stars
Decibel	(Positive)
Pitchfork	(4.4/10)
Spin	3.5/5 stars
Stylus	B−
Terrorizer	8.5/10 stars

Reviews for City of Echoes were mixed but generally positive. Guitarist Laurent Schroeder-Lebec has described it as their "pop album," in reference to the fact that it classifies as their most accessible to a mainstream audience. As such, it can be differentiated from earlier material as it consists of "shorter songs and expanded catchiness." Tom Lynch of Newcity Chicago describes is as a "colossal departure, a seemingly blatant shun of everything that came before. But not necessarily in a bad way". To that end, it has been praised as a rarity, as an instrumental album "you actually want to listen to over and over again". A Spin review attributed this to a "maturer" approach, "with the title track and the strongly melodic "Bliss in Concrete" achieving in five- or six-minute mini epics what used to take the band twice the time and effort."

The album's message was one decrying globalization, yet some critics were disappointed with the results. Joe McLaughlin notes: "when Pelican claim the record focuses on the 'homogenous effects of globalization', I think I am excused in wanting a touch more than an intricate guitar riff and a thumping bass line to ponder over [...] I struggle to gain a tangible meaning solely from crashing cymbals underpinning distorted guitars."

Much criticism has been leveled at the drumming of Larry Herweg, with Grayson Currin writing for Pitchfork Media that he "has consistently prevented his Chicago-based instrumental four-piece from being as transcendent as they've long been touted," and that on this album "it's worse than it's ever been, largely because it now seems that the excellent and consistently developing guitar duo of Laurent Schroeder-Lebec and Trevor de Brauw are better than they've ever been." Pelican themselves are aware of this ubiquitous criticism. Guitarist Trevor de Brauw states in a Decibel feature that "on the first two records, Pelican was a guitar band. On this one, we’re an actual band, which makes a world of difference to me", and that "some people think of instrumental music as music where the players need to be shredding constantly. That was never the direction of Pelican—we never wanted to be like Don Caballero or Hella." An AllMusic review posits that on this release "Herweg is allowed a far greater range of expression, and actually plays against the beat in places, seeming to be out of time, while creating a new space for the guitars to enter in terms of tempo and texture."

Decibel placed the album at number thirteen in its list of the top 40 albums of 2007.

== Track listing ==
All songs written by Pelican.

No.	Title	Length
1.	"Bliss in Concrete"	5:30
2.	"City of Echoes"	7:06
3.	"Spaceship Broken - Parts Needed"	6:04
4.	"Winds with Hands"	3:57
5.	"Dead Between the Walls"	5:06
6.	"Lost in the Headlights"	4:10
7.	"Far from Fields"	5:18
8.	"A Delicate Sense of Balance"	5:24

== Personnel ==
Band members

- Trevor de Brauw – guitar
- Bryan Herweg – bass
- Larry Herweg – drums
- Laurent Schroeder-Lebec – guitar

Other personnel

- John Golden – mastering
- Robin Laananen – photography
- Aaron Turner – album art and design
- Andrew Schneider – production
- Will Duncan – production and recording assistance
- Greg Norman – production and recording assistance
- Jon São Paulo – production and recording assistance
- Stephen Sowley – production and recording assistance
- Jeff Spatafora – production and recording assistance
- Rob Vestor – production and recording assistance

== Chart positions ==
Chart (2007)	Peak position
US Heatseekers Albums (Billboard)	9
US Independent Albums (Billboard)	40
