= March into the Sea =

EP by Pelican
- Released: April 12, 2005
- Recorded: 2004
- Studio: Electrical Audio, Chicago
- Genre: Post-metal
- Length: 32:50
- Label: Hydra Head Records (HH666-84)

Pelican chronology
Australasia (2003)	March into the Sea (2005)	The Fire in Our Throats Will Beckon the Thaw (2005)

Professional ratings
Review scores
Source	Rating
AllMusic	3.5/5 stars

March into the Sea is the second EP by American post-metal band Pelican, released in 2005 by Hydra Head Records. The title track is the original version of the shortened song "March to the Sea" from their 2005 album The Fire in Our Throats Will Beckon the Thaw, which was released just a month and a half later. The second track is a Justin Broadrick remix of "Angel Tears", a song from their 2003 debut full-length Australasia.

== Track listing ==
1. "March into the Sea" – 20:28
2. "Angel Tears" (J. K. Broadrick remix) – 12:22

== Personnel ==
Band members

- Trevor de Brauw – guitar
- Bryan Herweg – bass
- Larry Herweg – drums
- Laurent Schroeder-Lebec – guitar

Other personnel

- Chris de Brauw – flute
- Greg Norman – mixing
- Nick Zampiello – mastering
- Nathan Baker – photography
- Paul Jeffrey – layout
