= ...And the Sky Fell =

2010 extended play by Pet Slimmers of the Year

- ...And the Sky Fell original release on Lost Children Net Label cover art.

EP by Pet Slimmers of the Year
- Released: 27 June 2010
- Recorded: January 2010 – February 2010
- Studio: Jigsaw Studio, Market Deeping, Lincolnshire, England
- Genre: Post-metal; post-rock
- Length: 39:26
- Label: Lost Children
- Producer: Tom Savage

Pet Slimmers of the Year chronology
Pet Slimmers of the Year (2009)	...And the Sky Fell (2010)	Fragments of Uniforms (2013)

2011 band reissue cover
- ...And the Sky Fell band-released re-issue cover art.

...And the Sky Fell is the second extended play by English post-metal/post-rock band Pet Slimmers of the Year. It was first released digitally by Lost Children Net Label on 27 June 2010. It was later re-issued by the band with new artwork, first on compact disc on 23 February 2011, and then digitally on 11 May 2012.

The extended play was written and recorded with guitarist and vocalist Scott Gowan, bass guitarist Steve McKenna, and drummer Dale Vinten. It was tracked during January and February 2010, with producer Tom Savage at Jigsaw Studio, where the band had also recorded its debut extended play, Pet Slimmers of the Year, in 2008.

It is the band's first release to feature vocals, as all of its earlier material was fully instrumental. It is also the band's second and final release via British netlabel Lost Children Net Label, as Pet Slimmers of the Year would gather the attention of Anchor Music and Candlelight Records for its debut full-length album, Fragments of Uniforms.

== Background ==
=== Writing and recording ===
In January and February 2010, Pet Slimmers of the Year spent time at Jigsaw Studio in Market Deeping, Lincolnshire, recording five new songs with record producer Tom Savage. The band had previously recorded with Savage at his studio numerous times, including the session that yielded its eponymous extended play, Pet Slimmers of the Year, in late 2008.

The group was then a trio comprising bass guitarist Steve McKenna, drummer Dale Vinten, and guitarist Scott Gowan, the latter of which expanded his role by providing vocals for the first time on two songs: "Moravka" and "I Am the Ocean". In an interview with The Sludgelord in 2012, the band described the introduction of vocals to its music as:

"Actually two of the tracks on ...And the Sky Fell feature some vocal lines. These are faint and prop the tracks up with a little extra melody. We intend to keep the balance of instrumentals and vocals at this level because it's how we like to hear things. We're never going to become a band with a front man."

Pet Slimmers of the Year had composed and demoed eight to nine songs for the release during 2009, but only five were kept to fit within ...And the Sky Fell's concept and mood. The band conceptualized ...And the Sky Fell around water and the ocean, a theme it would continue to explore on its follow-up release, Fragments of Uniforms, which tells a story of being lost at sea. One of the songs dropped from ...And the Sky Fell was named "Untitled" and later appeared on Abridged Pause Recordings' Various Artists compilation, Billowing Tempestus, in 2016 (originally planned for release in 2012). When reflecting on the release's selection of songs with Abridged Pause Blog in 2016, Gowan explained:

"We wrote and recorded ["Untitled"] during the ...And the Sky Fell sessions. We had about eight or nine tracks that we thought were studio ready, but once they were recorded, we felt that a couple didn't fit and/or felt like they needed something else. This one in particular just didn't fit the record's theme. To be honest, we thought it was a little too cheery for ...And the Sky Fell. We're cheery people but we don't make cheery music."

=== Release and promotion ===
...And the Sky Fell was first released digitally on 27 June 2010, by British netlabel Lost Children Net Label, which had previously released the band's eponymous extended play in 2009. The release was given away for free download via the Internet Archive and the record label's website.

On 23 February 2011, the band self-released a compact disc version of ...And the Sky Fell, packaged in a jewel case. Only 200 copies were pressed, most of which were sold at local shows. The physical re-issue included all-new artwork and an expanded layout. Whereas the original digital issue via Lost Children Net Label only included an x-ray image of a human body as cover art (designed by McKenna), the band-released version featured a landscape water colour painting of an octopus by Vincent Drummond. Gowan detailed the process of the new artwork:

"The artwork for ...And the Sky Fell was done by our good friend Vincent Drummond, aka The Sleepwalker. We had an idea of what we wanted and Vince tirelessly hand water coloured the whole thing. Even the font for the title was scanned out of old books and put together letter by letter. We appreciate that kind of detail. I still think it's an impressive piece of art."

On 11 May 2012, five months after signing with Adam Mortaro's British music management company, Adequate Management, Pet Slimmers of the Year re-issued ...And the Sky Fell digitally with the new artwork. The re-issue was part of a promotional campaign by Adequate Management, which also saw the band's eponymous extended play receive renewed exposure. When speaking with The Sludgelord about giving the music away for free on Bandcamp, the Internet Archive and various blogs (rather than selling it via iTunes), the band explained:

"The industry has changed, and people paying for music isn't really feasible anymore. In this genre, you just want people to hear it so if that means giving our EPs away for free, then so be it. Particularly in this genre, bloggers more often help you rather than hinder. We're always grateful when anyone likes what we do enough to post/re-post it and share it with others; the more people that hear it the better, and blogging sites are a good medium to enable this to happen.

However, the band-released digital re-issues of Pet Slimmers of the Year and ...And the Sky Fell included slightly different versions of the songs from the ones originally released via Lost Children Net Label. Unintentionally, the band uploaded earlier masters of the songs (instead of the final masters), which were lacking certain samples, had different transitions between songs, or had unwanted silence. The differences were more drastic on Pet Slimmers of the Year, but on ...And the Sky Fell, the only difference was an accidental 17 seconds of silence at the end of "I Am the Ocean". Gowan later revealed:

"I think most of the differences [on Pet Slimmers of the Year] came from the transitions between the tracks. The samples weren't added until later and I think the wrong version was used for the digital release on our Bandcamp page. Both the CD and the original digital version should be the same. It wasn't until someone else pointed it out that we knew they were missing from the digital reissue."

In 2019, the band modified the artwork of both its eponymous extended play and ...And the Sky Fell for the name to read "PSOTY" instead of "Pet Slimmers of the Year".

== Critical reception and recognition ==
Professional ratings
Review scores
Source	Rating
Bahgheera's Orbit	Positive
Critical Masses	Positive
Hevy Petal	Positive
Schallgrenzen	Positive
TheSirensSound	Positive
TuxProject	Positive
Ziklibrenbib	Positive

Pet Slimmers of the Year and ...And the Sky Fell received generally positive reception upon release. TheSirensSound stated: "You are not going to believe this but a year ago when I posted their self-titled EP, I said exactly the same thing that I'm saying now: Definitely one of this week's top 10." Mark Martins of Echoes and Dust later expressed during a review of Sunless "Don't pass on their first two EPs entitled Pet Slimmers of the Year and ...And the Sky Fell. They are criminally underrated."

Ryan Masteller of Critical Masses offered: "Pet Slimmers of the Year pummel us right out of the gate with crushing mondo riffage. After the opening barrage, the instruments spread out and breathe, expanding the tightness of the heavy grooves to a more oceanic feel. When it peaks, it rocks with kinetic fury; in the valleys, it's calm and restrained, reflecting a shimmering blue expanse. They've got me hooked." The webzine Bahgheera's Orbit wrote: "How can I describe this release, other than to say it rocks? It is nothing but a pure heavy metal implosion, and more creative rock guitar and thunderous drum work combine for a beautifully artistic music experience to finish up. This release is top notch."

Peter A. Rehbein of Schallgrenzen opined "Over a year ago, Pet Slimmers of the Year received top marks three times for their debut EP. Nothing has changed for the trio, who offer a fine instrumental mix of post-metal and post-rock; the new EP, ...And the Sky Fell, definitely belongs to the better half of these genres. Elegant flanks and massive musical sliding tackle." Vincent Bouteloup of Ziklibrenbib provided: "Pet Slimmers of the Year's compositions superimpose melodic passages and incisive break-downs with high decibels."

Critics generally described Pet Slimmers of the Year and the music on ...And the Sky Fell as an equal mix of post-metal and post-rock, with some also categorizing it as sludge metal, and progressive metal. The band was often compared to their contemporaries like Isis, Red Sparrowes, Cave In, Baroness, Explosions in the Sky, God Is an Astronaut, Nihiling, and Tool.

== Track listing ==
Credits are adapted from the album's liner notes. All music by Gowan, McKenna and Vinten.

... And the Sky Fell track listing
No.	Title	Length
1.	"Moravka"	6:18
2.	"The Faith of Our Hate (Heaven's Gate Part One)"	9:43
3.	"Weir"	8:34
4.	"...And the Sky Fell"	2:32
5.	"I Am the Ocean"	12:19
Total length:		39:26

== Personnel ==
Credits are adapted from the album's liner notes.

Pet Slimmers of the Year

- Scott Gowan – vocals, guitar
- Steve McKenna – bass guitar
- Dale Vinten – drums

Production

- Tom Savage – recording engineer, mixer and producer at Jigsaw Studio
- Steve McKenna – artwork and layout (original version)
- Vincent Drummond – artwork and layout (re-issue version)

== Release history ==
Release formats for ...And the Sky Fell
Region	Date	Label	Format	Catalog
United Kingdom	27 June 2010	Lost Children Net Label	Digital	LostChildren083
United Kingdom	23 February 2011	self-released	CD	
United Kingdom	11 May 2012	self-released	Digital	
