= Forever Becoming =

2013 studio album by Pelican

- The 2019 Remix artwork features a gold border instead of white

Studio album by Pelican
- Released: October 15, 2013
- Studio: Electrical Audio Studios
- Genre: Post-metal
- Length: 50:12
- Label: Southern Lord (LORD182)
- Producer: Chris Common

Pelican chronology
Ataraxia/Taraxis (2012)	Forever Becoming (2013)	The Cliff (2015)

Forever Becoming is the fifth studio album by American post-metal band Pelican. The album was released on October 15, 2013 through Southern Lord Records. Forever Becoming marks Pelican's first release to not include founding guitarist Laurent Schroeder-Lebec.

Prior to the album's release, Pelican released an online stream of "Immutable Dusk" in July, 2013. "Deny the Absolute" was released as a stand-alone single in August, 2013, and later as a music video in December, 2014. An online stream of "The Cliff" was released in September, 2013, and was followed by The Cliff as a separate EP in 2015.

== Background and composition ==
Forever Becoming is the first Pelican album since its inception in 2001 to not feature founding guitarist Laurent Schroeder-Lebec. He withdrew from touring with Pelican in 2010, told his fellow band members that his "heart wasn't fully in it" following the recording of the 2012 EP Ataraxia/Taraxis, and publicly announced his departure two months after the release of the EP in June 2012. Schroeder-Lebec left to spend more time with his family. Pelican originally planned to carry on as a three-piece band, but then-touring guitarist Dallas Thomas of The Swan King became a full-time member and ended up contributing to the writing process of Forever Becoming. On working with Thomas, guitarist Trevor de Brauw said, "[Bassist Bryan Herweg] and I are more freewheeling. We don't have every detail worked out, whereas [Dallas Thomas] is very meticulous and really likes to have things thought out. Having that balance means we're not going to veer too far in either direction."

On the sound of Forever Becoming, de Brauw described it as being "a lot darker, depressive, and angry," which he attributed to the "nervous headspace" caused by continuing on without Schroeder-Lebec. The increased aggression of the album drew positive reactions from critics. While songs on some of Pelican's more recent albums experimented with a traditional or pop structures, the songs on Forever Becoming were designed to feature a narrative or journey, with songs intentionally ending very differently from where they began.

Forever Becoming was produced by Chris Common, formerly of These Arms Are Snakes, who also previously produced Pelican's 2009 studio album, What We All Come to Need.

== 2019 Remix ==
In February 2019, Pelican and Southern Lord announced a deluxe vinyl reissue of Forever Becoming. In a statement from Southern Lord, the label stated that the band was satisfied with the original recordings, but the post-production mixing and mastering was done in a makeshift studio that was set up in "less-than-ideal circumstances" that was said to have "varnished the incredible tones generated during tracking". The original producer Chris Common returned to remix and remaster the album at his own studio. Southern Lord said he brought "a new level of low-end depth, atmospheric clarity, and tight, punchy heaviness to the album." All streaming sites updated their version of Forever Becoming to the 2019 Remix version. In addition refreshed audio, the 2019 reissue also features the formerly Japan-only bonus track "Bardo" and the version of "The Cliff" from The Cliff EP with Allen Epley providing vocals (in addition to the original version).

== Critical reception ==
Professional ratings
Aggregate scores
Source	Rating
Metacritic	74/100
Review scores
Source	Rating
AllMusic	4/5 stars
Alternative Press	4/5 stars
The A.V. Club	A−
Consequence of Sound	C+
Pitchfork	7.2/10 stars
PopMatters	5/10 stars

Forever Becoming was met with positive reception. The album received an average score of 74/100 from 10 reviews on Metacritic, indicating "generally favorable reviews". Gregory Heaney of AllMusic wrote, "it seems the change in membership has reinvigorated them, providing their songs with a sense of stability that shines through on an album that easily ranks as some of the band's most exciting work in recent years." Writing for The A.V. Club, Jason Heller praised Forever Becoming, saying that "by stepping back and taking stock, Pelican has reconnected with what made it a pioneer in the first place: force, vision, and soul." Pitchfork writer Colin St. John said lauded the album's heightened aggression, saying the unusual heaviness proves that the band still has life left. However, not all critics were impressed by the efforts of this new version of Pelican; in a more middling review, PopMatters writer Brice Ezell (who had praised the band's previous EP) criticized Forever Becoming for regressing in quality and style.

== Track listing ==
No.	Title	Length
1.	"Terminal"	3:27
2.	"Deny the Absolute"	5:35
3.	"The Tundra"	5:13
4.	"Immutable Dusk"	7:01
5.	"Threnody"	8:07
6.	"The Cliff"	4:06
7.	"Vestiges"	7:15
8.	"Perpetual Dawn"	9:28
Total length:		50:12

Japanese bonus tracks
No.	Title	Length
1.	"Bardo"	3:38
2.	"Deny the Absolute" (7" Version)	5:35
3.	"The Truce" (7" Version)	3:16
Total length:		12:29

2019 Remix
No.	Title	Length
1.	"Terminal"	3:26
2.	"Deny the Absolute"	5:34
3.	"The Tundra"	5:14
4.	"Immutable Dusk"	7:02
5.	"Threnody"	8:09
6.	"The Cliff"	4:05
7.	"Vestiges"	7:17
8.	"Bardo"	2:58
9.	"Perpetual Dawn"	9:38
10.	"The Cliff" (feat. Allen Epley)	4:07
Total length:		57:30

== Personnel ==
Forever Becoming personnel according to liner notes.

Pelican

- Bryan Herweg
- Larry Herweg
- Trevor Shelley de Brauw
- Dallas Thomas

Additional musicians

- Chris Common – mellotron on "Threnody," additional drums on "The Tundra" and piano on "Perpetual Dawn"
- Bruce Lamont – baritone sax on "Terminal"

Production and recording

- Chris Common – recording, mixing
- Joe Lambert – mastering
- Jon San Paolo – assistant engineering
- Gregoire Yechen – assistant engineering

Art and design

- Stephen O'Malley – collage design
- Andrew Weiss – photography

== Chart positions ==
Chart (2013)	Peak position
US Top Hard Rock Albums (Billboard)	21
US Heatseekers Albums (Billboard)	7
US Indie Store Album Sales (Billboard)	22
