= Palms (band) =

American metal supergroup

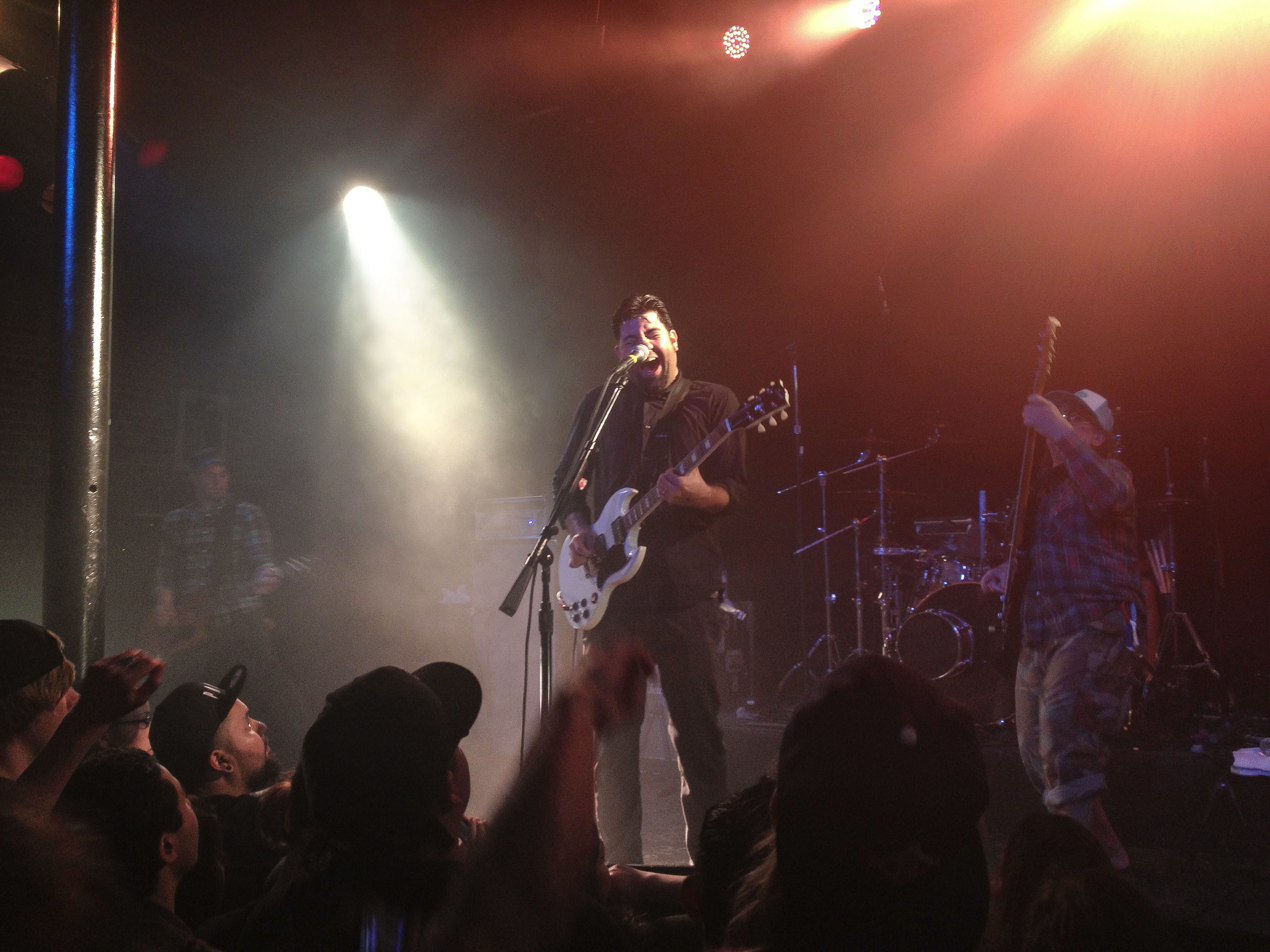
- Palms performing in 2013. From left to right: Caxide, Moreno and Meyer.

Background information
- Genres: Post-metal, post-rock, shoegaze, alternative rock
- Years active: 2011–present
- Label: Ipecac
- Spinoff of: Deftones; Isis
- Members: Aaron Harris; Jeff Caxide; Chino Moreno; Bryant Clifford Meyer
- Website: palmsband.com

Palms is an American post-metal supergroup that formed in 2011. The group features Deftones' vocalist Chino Moreno and three members of the post-metal band Isis: bassist Jeff Caxide, drummer Aaron Harris and guitarist Bryant Clifford Meyer.

== History ==
After the demise of Isis in 2010, Caxide, Harris and Meyer decided they wanted to continue making music together. Moreno, a longtime Isis fan, joined later, saying, "I've always dug the moods these dudes convey with their sound. I am excited to combine my sense of creativity with theirs, and to have fun doing so".

Palms also proved to be an outlet for Caxide, Harris and Meyer to expand their sound beyond what Isis was. Caxide said, "I think a lot of people are expecting this to sound like Isis with Chino singing. That's not what this is, because that's not exciting". The former Isis members intentionally strayed away from the compositional methods of their former band. Caxide said, "When we were writing these songs, I was coming up with ideas that I would never have presented to Isis. I don't want to call this 'pop music,' but it's more in that vein than anything I've ever done".

The group's self-titled debut album, which was originally expected to be released in 2012, was released on June 25, 2013 by Ipecac Recordings—a label that was co-founded by Mike Patton (Faith No More, Mr. Bungle) and released many of Isis' albums. Harris recorded and mixed the album. Harris recorded his drum tracks at Joe Barresi's (Queens of the Stone Age, Melvins) House of Compression studio, and Moreno recorded his vocals at Harris' home studio. In July 2013, Palms performed four shows in California in support of their debut album.

Palms released a music video for "Future Warrior" in September 2013, directed by Jon Mancinetti.

On May 27, 2014, a remix of Antarctic Handshake by iconAclass/deadverse was released by Ipecac Recordings. On June 27, the band announced a 2014 fall tour of the Southwest.

== Members ==
Current members

- Jeff Caxide – bass (2011–present), guitar (2013–present)
- Aaron Harris – drums (2011–present)
- Bryant Clifford Meyer – guitars (2011–present), keyboards (2011–2013)
- Chino Moreno – vocals (2011–present), guitar (2013–present)

Touring members

- Chuck Doom – keyboards, bass (2013–2014)

== Discography ==
=== Studio albums ===
- Palms (2013, Ipecac Recordings)

=== Singles ===
- "Antarctic Handshake" (IconAclass/deadverse Remix) (2014, Ipecac Recordings)
- "Opening Titles" / "End Credits" (2023, Ipecac Recordings)

=== Music videos ===
- "Future Warrior"
- "Mission Sunset"

=== Compilation contributions ===
- Puscifer – The Weaver (Virtual Vacuum Remix) (2013, Puscifer Entertainment)
- Pelican – The Cliff (Palms Remix) (2015, Southern Lord)
