= Australasia (album) =

Studio album by Pelican
- Released: November 4, 2003
- Recorded: 2003
- Studio: Volume Studios, Chicago
- Genre: Post-metal
- Length: 50:18
- Label: Hydra Head Records (HH666-75)
- Producer: Sanford Parker, Pelican

Pelican chronology
Pelican (2001)	Australasia (2003)	March into the Sea (2005)

Professional ratings
Review scores
Source	Rating
AllMusic	4/5 stars
Stylus	A−
Tiny Mix Tapes	4/5

Australasia is the debut studio album by American post-metal band Pelican. It was released November 4, 2003 on Hydra Head Records.

Guitarist Trevor de Brauw has noted that because of budget restrictions, the Australasia sessions had to be rushed. The studio was also under construction during recording and had a few impediments. Despite this, critical reception has been largely positive.

The track "Drought" was used in the 2009 war film The Messenger.

== Track listing ==
All tracks written by Pelican.

No.	Title	Length
1.	"NightEndDay"	11:15
2.	"Drought"	8:24
3.	"Angel Tears"	10:59
4.	"GW"	3:34
5.	"Untitled"	5:20
6.	"Australasia"	10:49
Total length:		50:18

=== Vinyl version ===
Side A
No.	Title	Length
1.	"NightEndDay"	11:15

Side B
No.	Title	Length
1.	"Drought"	8:24
2.	"GW"	3:34

Side C
No.	Title	Length
1.	"Angel Tears"	10:59
2.	"Untitled"	5:20

Side D
No.	Title	Length
1.	"Australasia"	10:49

== Personnel ==
Band members

- Trevor de Brauw – guitar
- Bryan Herweg – bass, cover and insert photography
- Larry Herweg – drums
- Laurent Schroeder-Lebec – guitar

Other personnel

- Andrew Furse – singing saw on the untitled track
- Jason Hellman – album artwork and design
- Sanford Parker – production and mixing
- Aaron Turner – album artwork and design
- Gregory White – cover and insert photography
- Nick Zampiello – mastering
