= Ataraxia/Taraxis =

EP by Pelican
- Released: April 10, 2012
- Studio: Engine Studios (Brooklyn, New York); Infrasonic Sound (Los Angeles, California)
- Genre: Post-metal
- Length: 18:03
- Label: Southern Lord Records (LORD155)
- Producer: Sanford Parker; Aaron Harris; Kemble Walters

Pelican chronology
What We All Come to Need (2009)	Ataraxia/Taraxis (2012)	Forever Becoming (2013)

Ataraxia/Taraxis is the fifth EP by American post-metal band Pelican, released through Southern Lord Records on April 10, 2012. Ataraxia/Taraxis was Pelican's final release to include founding guitarist Laurent Schroeder-Lebec until 2025's Flickering Resonance.

== Background and composition ==
In 2010, two years prior to the release of the Ataraxia/Taraxis EP, founding member and guitarist Laurent Schroeder-Lebec retired from touring with Pelican. In an official press release, it was clarified that the parting was amicable, and that he chose to focus on his family and career instead of the band. After concluding recording of Ataraxia/Taraxis, Schroeder-Lebec admitted that his "heart wasn't fully in" preparation for the next full-length album, and he removed himself from the composing process.

Pelican's goal with Ataraxia/Taraxis was to capture all major sides of the band's sound, "melodic rock, smokey doom, ambient soundscape, acoustic desert-folk, and minimalist electronics." Aaron Harris of fellow post-metal outfit Isis aided in recording percussion for the EP.

A music video for "Lathe Biosas" was released on August 20, 2013. A brief clip of the EP's first track, "Ataraxia", serves as the introduction to the video, which goes on to intersperse acted scenes with live performances.

== Critical reception ==
Professional ratings
Aggregate scores
Source	Rating
Metacritic	74/100
Review scores
Source	Rating
Alternative Press	4/5 stars
Consequence of Sound	C+
Drowned in Sound	8/10 stars
Exclaim!	8/10 stars
Metal Injection	(positive)
PopMatters	7/10 stars
Thrash Hits	5.5/6 stars

Ataraxia/Taraxis was met with positive reception. The EP received an average score of 74/100 from 7 reviews on Metacritic, indicating "generally favorable reviews". Alternative Press reviewer Jason Pettigrew called the EP "ambitious" and "essential". Denise Falzon of Exclaim! wrote, "Each song on Ataraxia/Taraxis is diverse, with moments of melodious prog-rock, powerful riffs and hazy ambience; however, there's also cohesion to the EP that makes it feel expansive and utterly epic." Writing for Drowned in Sound, Michael Brown said the EP "reinstates Pelican at the top of the instrumental food chain and, if they continue like this, they show no sign of coming down." Brice Ezell of PopMatters called moments of the EP disappointing, but also wrote that as a whole, it is excellent and never boring.

== Track listing ==
No.	Title	Length
1.	"Ataraxia"	3:21
2.	"Lathe Biosas"	4:46
3.	"Parasite Colony"	4:41
4.	"Taraxis"	5:14
Total length:		18:03

Japanese bonus tracks
No.	Title	Length
5.	"An Inch Above Sand" (Live)	3:58
6.	"The Creeper" (Live)	6:10
7.	"What We All Come to Need" (Demo)	5:22
Total length:		33:33

== Personnel ==
Pelican

- Trevor de Brauw – guitar
- Bryan Herweg – bass
- Larry Herweg – drums
- Laurent Schroeder-Lebec – guitar

Additional personnel

- Aaron Harris – recording
- Aaron D.C. Edge – layout
- Collin Jordan – mastering
- Sanford Parker – mixing, recording
- Andrew Weiss – photography
- Eric Palmquist – drum assistance

== Chart positions ==
Chart (2012)	Peak position
US Heatseekers Albums (Billboard)	23
