= The Fire in Our Throats Will Beckon the Thaw =

2005 studio album by Pelican

Studio album by Pelican
- Released: May 22, 2005
- Recorded: February 2005, at Electrical Audio, Chicago, Illinois
- Genre: Post-metal
- Length: 58:44
- Label: Hydra Head Records (HH666-91)
- Producer: Greg Norman, Pelican

Pelican chronology
March into the Sea (2005)	The Fire in Our Throats Will Beckon the Thaw (2005)	City of Echoes (2007)

The Fire in Our Throats Will Beckon the Thaw is the second studio album by American post-metal band Pelican. It was released May 22, 2005 on Hydra Head Records. Regarding the lengthy and unusual name of the album, guitarist Trevor de Brauw joked, "The title is meant to confuse people. The original title was going to be Black Doom on Tuesday."

According to de Brauw, various influences came into making the album, including early industrial, hardcore, other metal influences, and has also noted the high quality of the studio and exceptional amount of time the group had to finish the album compared to that of their previous effort, Australasia. As the band is very environmentally conscious, The Fire... has a nature-driven theme with song titles such as "Last Day of Winter", "Autumn into Summer" and "Aurora Borealis". It also marks the introduction of acoustic guitar to Pelican's catalog of full-length albums.

"March to the Sea" found substantial airplay on the satellite radio station Hard Attack. An extended version of the track, entitled "March into the Sea", was released on the group's similarly titled EP only a few months prior. This version has a less refined sound and runs nearly twice as long at 20:28. De Brauw considers the EP version a "teaser single before the record came out, as well as a collector's item for completionists."

== Reception ==
Professional ratings
Review scores
Source	Rating
Alarm	(Positive)
AllMusic	4/5 stars
Blabbermouth.net	8/10 stars
Blender	3/5 stars
Decibel	10/10 stars
Pitchfork	7/10
Stylus	(B+)

The Fire... was met with overall positive reception. Decibel Magazine chose it as #1 on their Top Albums of 2005 list, while Terrorizer ranked it at #35. Critics have cited its atmospheric and compositional excellence as well as the cohesiveness of the album as a whole. With the exception of tracks like "March to the Sea" and "Red Ran Amber," The Fire... is also noted as deemphasizing the heaviness found on Australasia while significantly expanding the group's style in favor of complex, layered melody. This attribute has been loathed by some fans of Pelican's previous work but largely seen as maturation. Many critics have expressed difficulty in labeling the album within a particular genre, but despite the range of influences involved in its creation, have often compared it to doom metal, post-rock, and groups like Isis.

Scott Alisoglu of Blabbermouth.net wrote, "The music of The Fire in our Throats... not only conjures visions of earth's explosive creation, but also the blending of pristine beauty with nature's unforgiving wrath. It's powerful stuff", and regarding its heaviness, added, "The one constant here is compositional excellence. Make no mistake though, The Fire in our Throats... is a heavy rock album. The band just paints with more colors and uses a bigger canvas on this one."

Andrew Bonazelli of Decibel, in reviewing Isis's 2004 Panopticon, compared the two albums and described their shared tone as "triumphant".

== Track listing ==
No.	Title	Length
1.	"Last Day of Winter"	9:37
2.	"Autumn into Summer"	10:44
3.	"March to the Sea"	11:38
4.	"•"	4:44
5.	"Red Ran Amber"	11:20
6.	"Aurora Borealis"	4:55
7.	"Sirius"	5:47
Total length:		58:44

== Personnel ==
Band members

- Trevor de Brauw – guitar
- Bryan Herweg – bass
- Larry Herweg – drums
- Laurent Schroeder-Lebec – guitar

Other personnel

- John Golden – mastering
- Jason Hellmann – photography
- Greg Norman – mixing and recording
- Aaron Turner – album artwork and construction
- Rob Vester – mixing and recording assistance

== Chart positions ==
Chart (2005)	Peak position
US Heatseekers Albums (Billboard)	44
