= Pelican (EP) =

EP by Pelican
- Released: 2001
- Recorded: 2001
- Studio: Seraph Studios
- Genre: Post-metal
- Length: 29:25
- Label: Hydra Head Records (HH666-68)
- Producer: Sanford Parker

Pelican chronology
Pelican (2001)	Australasia (2003)

Pelican (or Untitled) is the first EP by American post-metal band Pelican. It was originally released in 2001 as a demo album, before the band signed to Hydra Head Records, who re-released it in 2003. "Mammoth" was extended and re-released as "Pink Mammoth" on the band's Pink Mammoth EP.

== Track listing ==
All songs written by Pelican.

1. "Pulse" – 4:01
2. "Mammoth" – 4:57
3. "Forecast for Today" – 7:29
4. "The Woods" – 12:58

== Personnel ==
Band members

- Trevor de Brauw – guitar
- Bryan Herweg – bass
- Larry Herweg – drums
- Laurent Schroeder-Lebec – guitar

Other personnel

- Andrew Furse – photography
- Jason Hellman – album artwork and design
- Peter Nilges – photocopy manipulation
- Sanford Parker – production
- Aaron Turner – album artwork and design
- Douglas Ward – mastering
