= Ephemeral (EP) =

EP by Pelican
- Released: June 6, 2009
- Recorded: February 2009, Red Room Studios, Seattle, Wa.
- Genre: Post-metal
- Length: 20:46
- Label: Southern Lord Records (LORD105)
- Producer: Chris Common, Ed Brooks

Pelican chronology
PLCN/TAAS (2008)	Ephemeral (2009)	What We All Come to Need (2009)

Professional ratings
Review scores
Source	Rating
Alternative Press	4/5 stars

Ephemeral is the fourth EP by American post-metal band Pelican. It was their first recording to be released after signing with Southern Lord Records. The album consists of two previously unreleased songs in addition to a cover of "Geometry of Murder" by Earth featuring Earth guitarist Dylan Carlson.

The album was released on vinyl, and in CD format, although the CDs were limited to only 1,000 copies, and were sold only on Pelican's tour with Isis. After the tour, the remainder of the CDs were sold through Pelican's Web store, and through that of Southern Lord Records. Pelican announced through their myspace page that on the CD, the order of the first two songs had been reversed, although on the packaging, the order remained the same. On 24 October 2009, Pelican announced through their Facebook account that they would be re-printing the CD, in new packaging, and limited to 500 copies. The re-issue would only be available on their October/November 2009 tour.

The title track later appeared on What We All Come to Need, released a few months after.

== Track listing ==
1. "Embedding the Moss" – 7:46
2. "Ephemeral" – 5:25
3. "Geometry of Murder (Earth cover)" – 7:38

== Personnel ==
=== Band members ===
- Trevor de Brauw – guitar
- Bryan Herweg – bass
- Larry Herweg – drums
- Laurent Schroeder-Lebec – guitar

=== Other personnel ===
- Dylan Carlson – Guest guitar on "Geometry of Murder"
- Chris Common – Engineering and Mixing
- Ed Brooks – Mastering
