= Nambucca (venue) =

Live music venue in London

Coordinates: 51°33′39″N 0°7′25″W

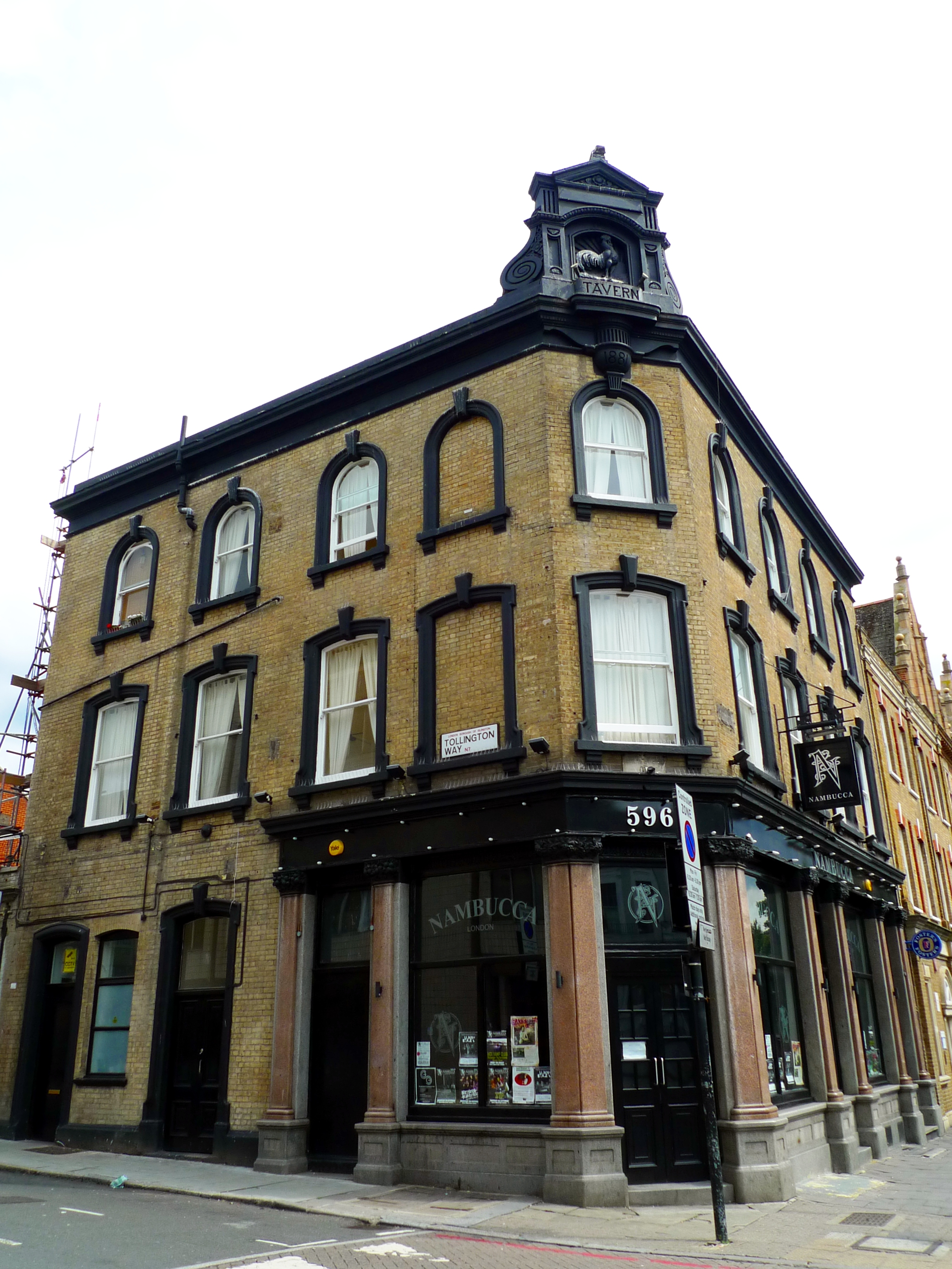
Nambucca

Nambucca is a live music venue in Holloway Road in London. Since being rebuilt following a fire it now houses two distinct areas in a big open plan venue - a front bar area and a rear dancefloor and gig area. It is popular with up-and-coming bands and hosts music and entertainment events on a nightly basis.

In the mid-part of the 2000s Nambucca provided a platform for many of the forerunners of the London nu-folk scene, with artists such as Frank Turner, Marcus Mumford, Beans on Toast and Laura Marling performing there regularly. It also was a staple of the burgeoning indie-scene led by The Libertines and many successful bands performed early gigs there including The Holloways who were actually formed at the venue and played their first gig there.

On 17 December 2008 a fire at the venue caused major destruction and it was almost two years before it reopened.

On 31 October 2014, after another closure, an extensive refurbishment and a change of ownership, the bar reopened once again. Many long-running and successful events have now found a new home at the venue in its latest incarnation.

Following refurbishment, Nambucca became a 300-capacity music venue, with the re-positioning of the stage to the back of the room as opposed to its former position at the left-hand side of the venue, allowing a clear view for all gig-goers. The venue had a 30-channel Soundtrack Si-Compact mixing desk and PA system. Since its reopening in 2014 it has hosted gigs by artists such as Wolf Alice, The Wombats, Fat White Family, John Power (Cast, The La's) The Rifles (band), The Enemy (UK rock band) and many more and housed the popular This Feeling and Some Weird Sin clubnights.

In April 2022, Nambucca announced it would be closing again, with no plans to reopen.

In October 2024 Nambucca re-opened under new management.

In 2026, Nambucca upgraded its productions facilities and reestablished itself as a music venue. In March 2026, Bombay Bicycle Club played 2 sold out dates at the venue to commemorate 20 years of being a band. The venue is currently equipped with an A&H SQ7 Mixing Desk and the first permanent UK install of a NEXO Alpha+ PA system.
