= Pelican (band) =

American post-metal band

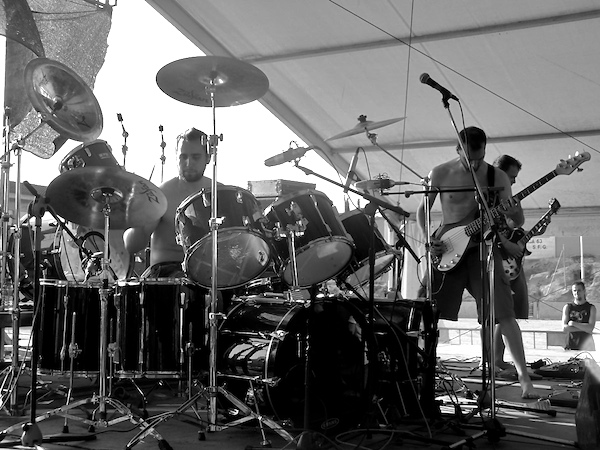
- Pelican performing at Sant Feliu Fest in 2004

Background information
- Origin: Chicago, Illinois, U.S.
- Genres: Post-metal, doom metal
- Years active: 2001–present
- Labels: Thrill Jockey; Southern Lord; Hydra Head; The Mylene Sheath; Run for Cover
- Spinoffs: Tusk
- Members: Trevor Shelley de Brauw; Laurent Schroeder-Lebec; Bryan Herweg; Larry Herweg
- Past members: Dallas Thomas
- Website: www.pelicansong.com

Pelican is an American post-metal band from Chicago, Illinois. Established in 2001, the band is known for their heavy, atmospheric and almost entirely instrumental style. They have released seven studio albums and six EPs.

== History and style ==
The band is known for dense combinations of different melodies and extended track lengths. It may be classified as stoner rock, doom metal, or post-rock.

Pelican were first affiliated with Hydra Head Records but by 2009 signed with Southern Lord Records roster. Pelican toured with Wolves in the Throne Room to support their first EP for Southern Lord, Ephemeral, released on June 6, 2009. What We All Come to Need was released on October 27, 2009. Greg Anderson and Aaron Turner both appeared on the album. In celebration of the new album, the "Pelican Burger" was served at Kuma's Corner for one night.

In 2012, Pelican announced a new EP, Ataraxia/Taraxis. In April 2012, they began a European tour, playing in England, Italy, Germany, Finland, the Dunk Festival in Belgium and the Roadburn Festival in the Netherlands. The support bands for this tour included Bo Ningen and Tacoma Narrows Bridge Disaster in the UK, and Tombs in continental Europe.

In June 2012, the band announced an amicable split with guitarist and founding member Laurent Schroeder-Lebec. Schroeder-Lebec had not been touring with the band for the prior two years, with Dallas Thomas of The Swan King performing live in his stead, but not participating in the writing process. On October 15, 2013, Pelican released its fifth studio album and first without Schroeder-Lebec, Forever Becoming.

Pelican announced three new upcoming releases in February 2019, the first of which was a remixing/remastering of Forever Becoming. While Pelican was satisfied with the original recordings, Chris Common mixed the tracks in a makeshift studio with "less-than-ideal circumstances" that "varnished the incredible tones generated during tracking". Southern Lord described the deluxe reissue as bringing "a new level of low-end depth, atmospheric clarity, and tight, punchy heaviness to the album". Pelican also announced a new album was coming in 2019, and slated a single from that album "Midnight and Mescaline"/"Darkness on the Stairs" for release on Record Store Day. Months later in April 2019, Pelican released the track "Midnight and Mescaline" for online streaming and formally announced that their sixth studio album was titled Nighttime Stories and would be released on June 7, 2019 through Southern Lord.

In 2022, guitarist Dallas Thomas left the band and Pelican announced founding guitarist Laurent Schroeder-Lebec would return for live performances later in the year. With this news, Pelican also announced the band's first three albums would receive deluxe remasters with additional bonus tracks though Thrill Jockey.

Larry Herweg, Trevor de Brauw, and Laurent Schroeder-Lebec are also members of the band Tusk.

== Popular culture ==
The song "Ephemeral", from the album What We All Come to Need, appears in the end credits of the 2013 horror video game Dead Space 3.

== Genre ==
Regarding the band's genre, de Brauw said, "I think people use genres and tags to serve a purpose – it gives people a frame of reference to understand music by – but I don't think any artist feels comfortable being tagged as anything. I have an affinity for metal, but I don't think of Pelican as a metal band. So when people call us 'instrumetal', or post-metal, or metalcore or whatever, I can see why they say that, but it's not something that I feel a close connection with. I feel we're part of a community with some bands – Mono are good friends of ours, but I don't feel that we're that similar musically. Their music is more similar to classical music, whereas I feel ours has more in common with punk and hardcore. I feel like we're part of a trajectory of Midwest bands that kind of blend aggression with a pop sensibility, so while it's easy to classify us with instrumental bands, we're not instrumental by design. We just didn't know how to put vocals in our music and for it to sound right. When you start a band, you don't have it in mind to be an instrumental band – these things are afterthoughts when your music's out there."

Speaking on the plethora of labels used to describe Pelican's genre, bassist Bryan Herweg states that "it's flattering, really", and that "I take that as nobody being able to classify what we're doing. I really don't want to be fixed in one genre."

As for the instrumental nature of the band, Herweg states that "I think there are limitations that come with having a vocalist. If we had some big burly man in front screaming, we'd be classified as metal. If we had some scrawny guy we'd be emo. As it is, no one can pin us down."

Touring has evolved the band's style from "drawn-out... slow-building" to "more direct and faster, and straight to the point" material to provide more energy on stage.

== Personnel ==
Current

- Trevor de Brauw – guitar (2001–present)
- Bryan Herweg – bass (2001–present)
- Larry Herweg – drums (2001–present)
- Laurent Schroeder-Lebec – guitar (2001–2012, 2022–present)

Former

- Dallas Thomas – guitar (2012–2020; touring musician 2011–2012)

== Discography ==
Studio albums

- Australasia (2003)
- The Fire in Our Throats Will Beckon the Thaw (2005)
- City of Echoes (2007)
- What We All Come to Need (2009)
- Forever Becoming (2013)
- Nighttime Stories (2019)
- Flickering Resonance (2025)

EPs

- Pelican (2001)
- March into the Sea (2005)
- Pink Mammoth (2007)
- Ephemeral (2009)
- Ataraxia/Taraxis (2012)
- The Cliff (2015)
- Ascending (2026)

Live albums

- Arktika (Live from Russia) (2014)
- Live at Empty Bottle December 15, 2015 (2016)
- Live in Wroclaw, November 23 2007 (2016)
- Live at Dunk!Fest 2016 (2016)
- Live at the Grog Shop (2020)

Compilations

- The Wooden Box (2010)
- B-Sides and Other Rarities (2020)

Splits

- Pelican / Scissorfight / The Austerity Program (2003)
- Pelican / Playing Enemy (2005)
- Pelican / Mono (2005)
- These Arms Are Snakes / Pelican (2008)
- Young Widows / Pelican (2009)

Singles and music videos

- "Autumn into Summer" (2005)
- "Dead Between the Walls" (2007)
- "Lost in the Headlights" (2008)
- "Final Breath" (2010)
- "Lathe Biosas" (2012)
- "Deny the Absolute" (2013)
- "Midnight and Mescaline" / "Darkness on the Stairs" (2019)
- "For Your Entertainment" / "Gasoline" (2023)
- "Adrift" / "Tending the Embers" (2024)

DVDs

- Live in Chicago 06/11/03 (2005)

Multi-format sets

- After the Ceiling Cracked (2008)

Other appearances

- Metal Swim – Adult Swim compilation album (2010)
