= What We All Come to Need =

2009 studio album by Pelican

Studio album by Pelican
- Released: October 27, 2009
- Recorded: July 2009
- Studio: Robert Lang (Shoreline, Washington); Red Room Studio (Seattle, Washington)
- Genre: Post-metal
- Length: 51:35
- Label: Southern Lord
- Producer: Chris Common

Pelican chronology
Ephemeral (2009)	What We All Come to Need (2009)	Ataraxia/Taraxis (2012)

What We All Come to Need is the fourth studio album by American post-metal band Pelican. The album was released on October 27, 2009 through Southern Lord Records and was the band's first for the label after leaving Hydra Head Records earlier in 2009.

A music video for "Final Breath" released on December 22, 2009, directed by Matt Santoro.

== Background and composition ==
In late 2008, Pelican recognized a decline in group morale and in concert attendance, so the band considered slowing touring. However, they were already signed up for a tour in mid-2009 prior to the recording of What We All Come to Need, leading to some frustration in the members who wanted to not burn out.

"By the end of the year we had way overextended ourselves from the point of what we wanted to do. We didn’t know that we wanted to pump the brakes going into the making of that album, but we were not doing it actively and ended up burning ourselves out in the process. So by the time we got to the studio, we were very well-rehearsed because of the touring, but that burned-out feeling was really setting in."

—Trevor de Brauw on the band's dwindling enthusiasm.

The album was recorded in three weeks during the summer of 2009 with a generous recording budget from Southern Lord Records, the group's new label after leaving Hydra Head Records. The inspiration of a new setting and label, though, wasn't enough to offset the band's fatigue. According to guitarist Trevor de Brauw, the tour leading up to What We All Come to Need, the recording of the album, and the tour following the album made up Pelican's darkest times. De Brauw's mother was sick, the band had been on the road extensively, and morale was generally low. As such, What We All Come to Need eschews some of the joyous aspects of Pelican's music, adopting a dark tone that would be further explored in the band's followup album, Forever Becoming (2013).

"Ephemeral"
"Ephemeral" showcases the album's mixture of melody and post-metal distortion.

Pelican enlisted several guest musicians to contribute to the album, including guitarists Greg Anderson of Sunn O))) and Aaron Turner of Isis, and, most notably, vocalist Allen Epley of The Life and Times and Shiner. Epley sang on the closing song "Final Breath", which made this album the first studio album from Pelican to feature a track with vocals. Bassist Bryan Herweg wrote "Final Breath", and from the beginning he conceptualized the song as having vocals. De Brauw described hearing the full version of the song for the first time as "a real positive moment in all the darkness." The song "Ephemeral" previously appeared on the EP of the same name, while the song "An Inch Above Sand", appearing originally as "Inch Above Sand" on Pelican's split with Young Widows, was re-recorded for the album.

Musically, What We All Come to Need is a predominantly instrumental post-metal album. Some publications saw it as Pelican's most accessible release to date, and the album was praised for conveying a sort of silent narrative. Much of the music is melodic, but the guitars are weighty and downtuned, providing the slow and distorted riffs that define post-metal.

== Release ==
Professional ratings
Aggregate scores
Source	Rating
Metacritic	79/100
Review scores
Source	Rating
AllMusic	4.5/5 stars
Alternative Press	4/5 stars
Beyond Race	(lukewarm)
Lambgoat	8/10
Pitchfork	5.5/10
PopMatters	9/10 stars
Rock Sound	8/10

What We All Come to Need was released on October 27, 2009. In celebration of the album's release, Kuma’s Corner, a Chicago-based restaurant two blocks from guitarist Laurent Schroeder-Lebec's home, offered a custom burger known as the Pelican burger. The one-night-only dish consisted of a ten-ounce Kobe beef patty, with pan-seared scallops and lardons, in a garlic white-wine sauce on top of a Parmesan crisp, and served with white wine–garlic aioli. Ironically, both Schroeder-Lebec and Trevor de Brauw are vegans and therefore could not eat the specialized dish.

The song "Ephemeral" appeared in the end credits of the 2013 horror video game Dead Space 3.

=== Critical reception ===
What We All Come to Need was met with mostly positive reception. The album received an average score of 79/100 from 10 reviews on Metacritic, indicating "generally favorable reviews". AllMusic reviewer Thom Jurek praised the album, writing, "This is still insanely large-sounding music, and is heavy in the extreme, but its new tenets give listeners more to hold on (and perhaps dream on) than simply low-tuned, ponderous riffing." Rock Sound writer Mike Kemp called the album Pelican's best work yet. Writing for PopMatters, Andrew Dietzel said, "[the album] is balance and perspective before death, and Pelican provides that with perfect precision." In a more lukewarm review, Pitchfork writer Cosmo Lee criticized how the album was instrumental, saying that the band was held back by not incorporating a vocalist.

== Track listing ==
All tracks are written by Pelican.

No.	Title	Length
1.	"Glimmer"	7:31
2.	"The Creeper"	7:20
3.	"Ephemeral"	5:09
4.	"Specks of Light"	7:46
5.	"Strung Up from the Sky"	5:12
6.	"An Inch Above Sand"	4:14
7.	"What We All Come to Need"	6:47
8.	"Final Breath"	7:29
Total length:		51:35

== Personnel ==
All credits adapted from liner notes of the album.

Pelican

- Trevor de Brauw – guitar
- Bryan Herweg – bass
- Larry Herweg – drums
- Laurent Schroeder-Lebec – guitar

Additional musicians

- Greg Anderson – guest guitar (2)
- Allen Epley – vocals (8)
- Aaron Turner – guest guitar (7)
- Ben Verellen – guest bass (1)

Technical personnel

- Ed Brooks – mastering
- Chris Common – production, engineering and mixing
- Layne McKay – engineering assistance
- Derek Moree – engineering assistance

Art and design

- Seldon Hunt – photo montage and cover design
- Andrew Weiss – original photography

== Chart performance ==
Chart (2009)	Peak position
US Billboard Independent Albums	44
US Billboard Heatseekers	13
