= Knut (band) =

Swiss mathcore/sludge metal band

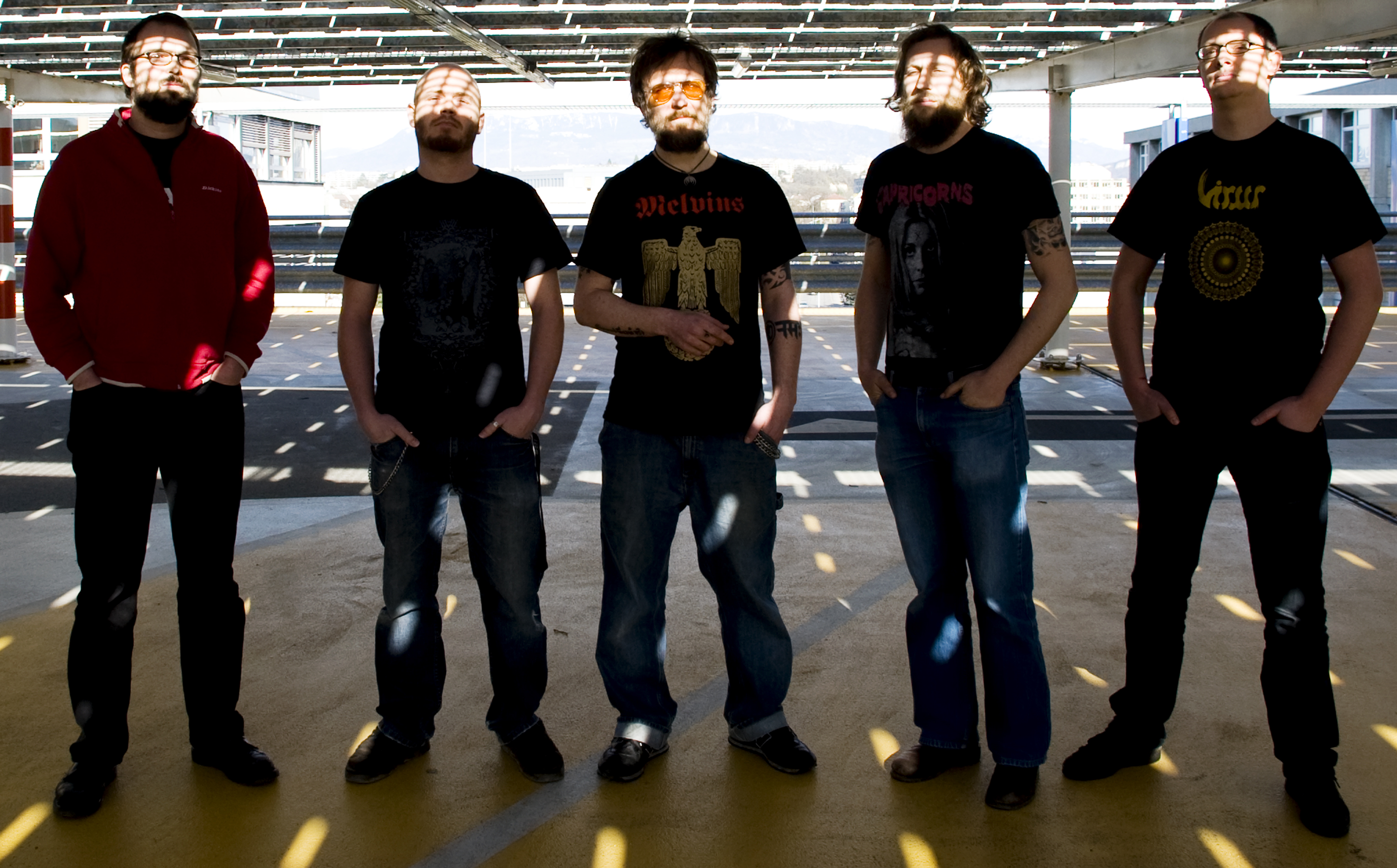
- 2010 promotional photo in Geneva

Background information
- Origin: Geneva, Switzerland
- Genres: Mathcore, sludge metal
- Years active: 1994–2012
- Labels: Hydra Head, Conspiracy, Snuff, Division, Head, Hummus
- Past members: Didier Séverin (deceased); Roderic Mounir; Jerome Doudet; Tim Robert-Charrue; Christian Valleise Thierry Van Osselt; Philippe Hess; Jeremy Tavernier; Gabriel Farine; Jerome Pellegrini; Thomas Guillanton
- Website: Knut on Facebook

Knut (Russian word for "whip", pronounced "cnoot") were a Swiss mathcore/sludge metal band from Geneva, formed in 1994.

== History ==
The band started by playing in the local underground squat scene, publishing a couple of seven-inch releases as well as their first CD in 1997, titled Leftovers. This early material was put out on Snuff Records, which was run by Roderic Mounir and Didier Séverin. In 1998, Knut released their first full-length, Bastardiser, which showcased a sharper and more focused aggression, combining heavily distorted guitars, odd-time signatures, use of discordance and repetition, and harsh vocals.

The band started touring Europe and shared the stage with bands like Zeni Geva, The Young Gods, Blockheads, Voivod and Neurosis. The year 1999 would prove crucial for Knut, with tours alongside Converge and Botch, both of whom had released records on the Hydra Head imprint. They brought Knut to the attention of label owners Aaron Turner and Mark Thompson, who quickly decided to reissue Bastardiser in the United States and invited them to tour. In August 2001, Knut completed an extensive trek on US soil opening for Isis, playing alongside Thrones, Converge, Keelhaul, Pelican, Premonitions of War, Anodyne, The Cancer Conspiracy, ending at New York's infamous CBGB club.

In 2002, Challenger was released. Recorded at Serge Morattel's Rec Studio in Geneva, the album exceeded all expectations by pushing the envelope of heaviness, dynamics, atmosphere and chaos simultaneously. It ended in Terrorizer Magazine's end of year list next to Isis, Mastodon, The Dillinger Escape Plan, Queens of the Stone Age and Meshuggah. Knut kept touring as much as they could, but never as a full-time activity. In 2004, the band took a break while planning their next moves, writing the follow-up to Challenger and working on an experimental remix album, Alter, with contributions from Justin Broadrick, Mick Harris, Dalek, Francisco López, and Asmus Tietchens. Terraformer was recorded in late 2004 in Geneva, engineered by their friend Jerome Pellegrini (former Nostromo guitarist, now in Mumakil). Originally meant to be a demo of the album, the session proved satisfactory enough for a proper release.

In May 2005, Roderic joined Jesu for a European tour, filling in on drums for Ted Parsons. Before the release of Terraformer, Phil Hess quit the band. Jeremy Tavernier took over guitar duties (as, in fact, he had done on most of Terraformer) while Jerome Doudet joined on bass, quickly followed by Tim Robert-Charrue on second guitar. After several European tours in 2006, including the UK with Taint and an appearance at Hellfest alongside Opeth, Nile, Ringworm, Capricorns and Celtic Frost, Jeremy decided to leave and concentrate on his grindcore band Mumakil. Christian Valleise took his spot and Knut quickly hit the road, including Eastern Europe with fellow Swiss noise act Monno. In 2008–2009 the band played a number of shows, refining their new formula and taking time to write what would become their fifth studio album.

In 2010, they released their first new studio album in more than five years. Not content to simply recreate the sound of their past albums, Knut strove to reinvent themselves in Wonder by incorporating new melodic elements and psychedelic ambience into their songs. Festivals and tours followed, including Europe with Keelhaul, and Russia for the first time. But in January 2012, Knut announced that they were on "indefinite hiatus".

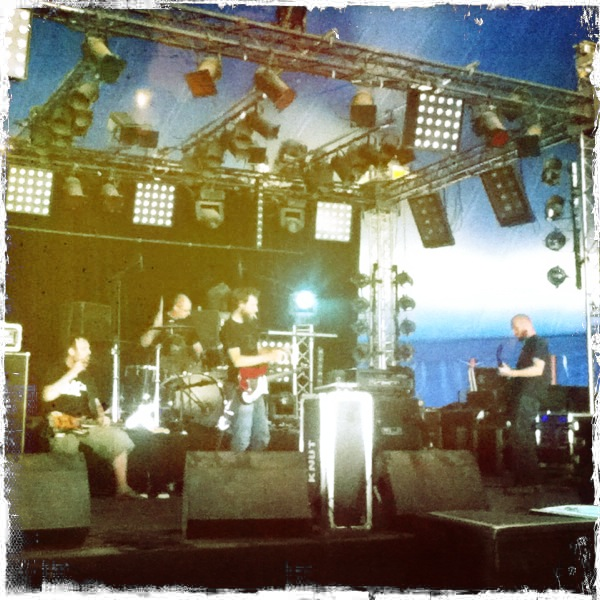
Knut performing in 2011

In December 2013, the band briefly reconvened at Serge Morattel's Rec Studio for a cover of Godflesh's "Merciless" song, featuring Franz Treichler of The Young Gods on vocals. The track would open a tribute album titled Fathers Of Our Flesh – Tribute to Godflesh, released in 2014 by Italian label Fobofile Productions and featuring Nadja, Eagle Twin, Author & Punisher, Transitional, Omega Massif, Gnaw and more.

Several vinyl reissues carried out the Knut legacy. In 2019, French imprint Head Records reissued Bastardiser on vinyl, freshly remastered by Lad Agabekov from Nostromo, using the original Snuff Records artwork. An essay detailing those recording sessions was written and uploaded with vintage pictures by the band. In 2020, Swiss label Hummus Records gave Knut's first CD Leftovers its first-ever vinyl release, complete with reworked layout and once again a remaster by Lad Agabekov. Terraformer followed in April 2021.

Former Knut members have carried out various musical endeavours. Roderic Mounir, Tim Robert-Charrue and Christian Valleise started a metallic noise act named Brutalist (2014–2018) with fellow Genevan guitarist Adriano Perlini. A five-track recording was uploaded in 2019. Didier Séverin, for his part, actively explored the dark tones of electronic drone with his strom|morts trio, resulting in a number of recorded collaborations.

Séverin died on 23 March 2022, ceasing any hopes for the band to reform.

On 24 March 2023, Didier's friends marked the first anniversary of his passing by holding an event at L'Usine, Geneva's main underground venue where he worked for a while a longtime ago. Called Didzfest, it featured bands that were close to Knut (Nostromo, Impure Wilhelmina, HEX, TERM) as well as his latest drone band strom|morts performing as a two-piece, plus three noise/drone/ambient projects (POL, Solastalgia, The Dead Travel Fast). Former Knut members played a short instrumental set with longtime brothers Jimbob Isaac (former Taint, Hark, now Silverburn mainman) and Panos Agoros (Dephosphorus) holding the mic on a couple of songs.

== Members ==
=== Final lineup ===
- Didier Séverin – vocals, electronics (1994–2012) (died 2022)
- Roderic Mounir – drums, additional guitars (1994–2012)
- Jerome Doudet – bass, additional electronics (2005–2012)
- Tim Robert-Charrue – guitar (2006–2012)
- Christian Valleise – guitar (2007–2012)

=== Former members ===
- Thierry Van Osselt – bass (1994–1998)
- Philippe Hess – guitar (1994–2005)
- Jeremy Tavernier – bass (1998–2005), guitar (2005–2006)
- Gabriel Farine – bass (1998)
- Jerome Pellegrini – bass (1998)
- Thomas Guillanton – guitar (2003)

== Discography ==
- Knut 7" (1994, self-released, 200 copies, hand-numbered)
- Split 7" with Ishma (1996, Bone Tone Records)
- Leftovers MCD (1997, Snuff Records / 2003, Ronald Reagan Records / 2020, Hummus Records, vinyl)
- Bastardiser (1998, Snuff Records / 1999, Chrome St. Magnus Records, vinyl / 2019, Head Records, vinyl)
- Split 7" with Tantrum (1998, Snuff Records/Vicious Circle)
- Ordeal 7" (1999, Snuff Records/Molaire Industries)
- DIY MCD (1999, self-released)
- Live split 10" with Botch and Ananda (2000, Mosh Bart Industries)
- Knut CDEP (2001, Hydra Head Records)
- Challenger (2002, Hydra Head Records / 2010, Division Records, gatefold cover, orange vinyl)
- Terraformer (2005, CD on Hydra Head Records, vinyl on Conspiracy Records / 2021, Hummus Records, vinyl)
- Alter anniversary remix album (2006, Hydra Head Records)
- Wonder (2010, Hydra Head Records/Conspiracy Records)
