= Wonder (Knut album) =

Studio album by Knut
- Released: 2010
- Genre: Post-hardcore, mathcore, sludge metal, noise rock, math rock, experimental rock
- Length: 40:00
- Label: Hydra Head Records

Knut chronology
Terraformer (2005)	Wonder (2010)

Wonder is the fourth and final album by Swiss band Knut, released in 2010 on Hydra Head Records. It was their first new studio album in more than five years. Not content to simply recreate the sound of their past albums, Knut strove to reinvent themselves in Wonder by incorporating new melodic elements and psychedelic ambience into their songs. Festivals and tours followed, including Europe with Keelhaul, and Russia for the first time. However, in January 2012, Knut announced that they were on "indefinite hiatus". Subsequently the death of frontman Didier Séverin in 2022 ended any possibility of a reunion, making Wonder the last studio recording by Knut.

== Track listing ==
1. "Leet" – 3:20
2. "Damned Extroverts" – 1:55
3. "Suckers" – 2:12
4. "Calamity" – 1:43
5. "Ultralight Backpacking" – 6:42
6. "Segue 1" – 1:40
7. "Fast Forward Bastard" – 3:20
8. "Lemmings" – 1:53
9. "If We Can't Fly There, We'll Take the Boat" – 6:33
10. "Segue 2" – 2:12
11. "Wonder / Daily Grind" – 8:30

== Personnel ==
- Didier Severin – vocals/electronics
- Jerome Doudet – bass
- Tim Robert-Charrue – guitar
- Roderic Mounir – drums/guitar
- Christian Valleise - guitar
