= Keelhaul =

Keelhaul may refer to:

- Keelhauling, a form of corporal punishment used against sailors
- Operation Keelhaul, a 1946–1947 Allied operation to identify and repatriate Soviet military collaborators
- Keelhaul (band), American band from Ohio
- Keel-Haul (G.I. Joe), a character in the fictional G.I. Joe universe
