= Temporal (Isis album) =

Compilation album by Isis
- Released: November 6, 2012
- Recorded: 1999–2010
- Length: 111:49 + DVD
- Labels: Ipecac; Daymare

Isis chronology
Live VI (2012)	Temporal (2012)	Live VII (2017)

Professional ratings
Aggregate scores
Source	Rating
Metacritic	77/100
Review scores
Source	Rating
AllMusic	4/5 stars
Pitchfork	6.7/10
Revolver	3.5/5

Temporal is a compilation album by the American post-metal band Isis, containing various demo recordings, rare and unreleased tracks, and remixes from throughout the band's history. It was released on November 6, 2012, by Ipecac Recordings.

== Content ==
Temporal includes demos and alternate versions of songs from Oceanic, Panopticon, In the Absence of Truth, and Wavering Radiant. Also featured are songs from the Melvins / Isis split and the Sawblade EP. "Temporal" was originally used in a promotional video for Wavering Radiant. "Grey Divide", recorded in 2001, was previously unreleased. A DVD included with the compilation collects all five of the band's music videos.

== Track listing ==
Disc one
No.	Title	Length
1.	"Threshold of Transformation (demo)"	9:38
2.	"Ghost Key (alternate demo version)"	8:34
3.	"Wills Dissolve (alternate demo version)"	6:56
4.	"Carry (demo)"	6:30
5.	"False Light (demo)"	7:44
6.	"Grey Divide (demo)"	16:34

Disc two
No.	Title	Length
1.	"Streetcleaner" (Godflesh cover from Sawblade EP, 1999)	5:42
2.	"Hand of Doom" (Black Sabbath cover from Sawblade EP, 1999)	8:36
3.	"Not In Rivers, But In Drops (Melvins / Lustmord remix)" (from "Holy Tears" single, 2008)	5:30
4.	"Holy Tears (Thomas Dimuzio remix)" (from "Not In Rivers, But In Drops" single, 2008)	12:14
5.	"Temporal"	2:03
6.	"Way Through Woven Branches" (from Melvins / Isis split, 2010)	6:24
7.	"Pliable Foe" (from Melvins / Isis split, 2010)	7:43
8.	"20 Minutes / 40 Years (acoustic version)"	7:40

Digital bonus tracks / Disc three (Daymare release)
No.	Title	Length
1.	"From Sinking (demo)"	8:32
2.	"Syndic Calls (demo)"	9:28
3.	"In Fiction (demo)"	8:29
4.	"20 Minutes / 40 Years (demo)"	6:53
5.	"Hall of the Dead (demo)"	6:44

DVD
No.	Title	Length
1.	"In Fiction" (video)	5:34
2.	"Not In Rivers, But In Drops" (video)	7:49
3.	"Holy Tears" (video)	7:07
4.	"20 Minutes / 40 Years" (video)	7:31
5.	"Pliable Foe" (video)	7:47

== Personnel ==
Isis

- Jeff Caxide – bass
- Aaron Harris – drums, audio recording, mixing
- Michael Gallagher – guitar, photography
- Bryant Clifford Meyer – electronics, audio recording
- Aaron Turner – guitar, vocals, album art, design, photography
- Jay Randall – electronics and vocals on "Streetcleaner"

Technical

- James Plotkin – mastering
