= KEN Mode =

Canadian rock/metal band

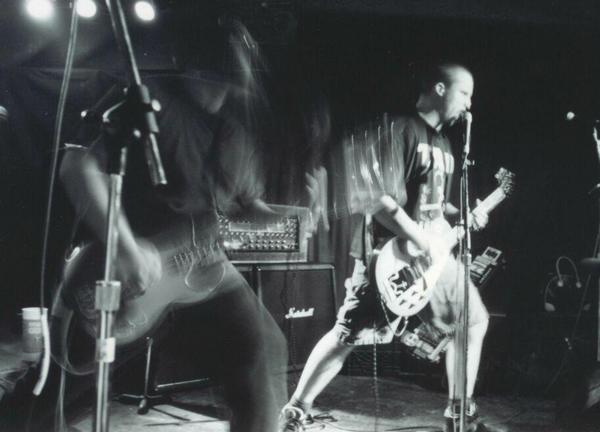
- KEN Mode performing circa 2002

Background information
- Origin: Winnipeg, Manitoba, Canada
- Genres: Noise rock; sludge metal; post-hardcore; metalcore
- Years active: 1999–present
- Labels: Season of Mist, Escape Artist, Arctodus, No List, Profound Lore, Init, Throatruiner
- Members: Jesse Matthewson; Shane Matthewson; Scott Hamilton; Kathryn Kerr
- Past members: Darryl Laxdal; Drew Johnston; Jahmeel Russell; Chad Tremblay; Thérèse Lanz; Andrew LaCour
- Website: www.ken-mode.com

KEN Mode (stylized as KEN mode; "KEN" being an acronym for "Kill Everyone Now") is a Canadian noise rock band from Winnipeg, Manitoba, that was formed in September 1999.

== History ==
Formed by brothers Jesse (guitar/vocals) and Shane Matthewson (drums) and long-time friend Darryl Laxdal (bass), the group released several demos from 1999 to 2003, leading to the release of their debut full length Mongrel on Escape Artist Records.

Several tours followed with the likes of Relapse Records' The End, Sulaco and American Heritage in addition to regional dates with Mastodon, Burnt By The Sun, Anodyne, Pelican, Harkonen, Breather Resist, The Dream is Dead, Psyopus, Daughters, and Buried Inside across the Midwestern and East Coast United States, and throughout Canada. In 2004, Laxdal left the band, only to rejoin in 2005 to finish the band's follow-up record Reprisal, released in 2006 on CD by Escape Artist Records, and on double-LP by No List Records. After the recording of Reprisal, Laxdal and the band parted ways again. Picking up bass duties after Laxdal's departure was Drew Johnston (guitarist in Electro Quarterstaff) who also played with Jesse, Shane and Darryl in Hide Your Daughters.

In October 2006, the band took part in the "Exclaim! Magazine Aggressive Tendencies Tour" with Pelican and Daughters across Canada. Bass duties were handled by former Kittens and Projektor member Jahmeel Russell who played with Jesse, Shane, and Drew in Hide Your Daughters.

KEN Mode went on to work with Jahmeel for the band's third full-length, Mennonite, which was released in July 2008 on CD by Jesse Matthewson's own label, Arctodus Records, and on 3x7" vinyl by No List Records.

Prior to releasing Mennonite, Chad Tremblay joined the band as their fourth bassist in two years. The band embarked on a European tour with Welsh rockers Taint. Tremblay went go on to direct the band's debut music video for the song "Extending Common Courtesy Throughout The Evening" from their Mennonite album.

In 2010, the band announced that Profound Lore Records will release its fourth full-length album, titled Venerable, to be recorded August 2010 with Kurt Ballou of Converge. They also announced several North American tours with Gaza, Engineer, Rosetta, Buried Inside, Wolvhammer, Clinging To The Trees Of A Forest Fire, and others. Venerable was released March 15, 2011, surrounded by an 8-week North American tour, joining forces with the likes of Black Breath, Fuck the Facts, and Khann. An unrelenting tour schedule followed for the bulk of 2011 and beginning of 2012: June 2011 in the US with Deafheaven; June 19, 2011, the band played the Hellfest Open Air festival in Clisson France; July and August 2011 in the Midwestern US and Eastern Canada with the Great Sabatini; September and October 2011 in the US with the Atlas Moth and an extensive European run with Kylesa and Circle Takes The Square in January and February 2012.

On March 31, 2012, Venerable won the inaugural Heavy Metal/Hard Music Album of the Year Juno Award in Canada. Venerable was also nominated for Rock Album of the Year by the Western Canadian Music Awards.

In addition to the non-stop touring cycle for Venerable, KEN Mode went through three bassists before finally enlisting former Khann guitarist and songwriter Andrew LaCour, who toured with the band from July 2011 onward, and contribute to the writing of their fifth album, Entrench.

November 2012 saw the band sign a worldwide deal with Season of Mist Records to release its fifth album, who they spent September and October recording and mixing with Matt Bayles. Entrench was released in March 2013. In June 2013, the album was longlisted for the 2013 Polaris Music Prize and was nominated for the Heavy Metal/Hard Music Album of the Year Juno Award, their second album nominated since the award's inception in 2012.

Their 2023 album Void was a longlisted nominee for the 2024 Polaris Music Prize.

== Members ==
=== Current members ===
- Jesse Matthewson − guitars, lead vocals (1999−present), bass, piano (2012−present)
- Shane Matthewson − drums (1999−present)
- Scott Hamilton − bass, backing vocals (2014−present)
- Kathryn Kerr − saxophone, synth, piano, percussion, backing vocals (2021−present)

=== Former members ===
- Darryl Laxdal − bass, backing vocals (1999−2004, 2005)
- Drew Johnston − bass (2006)
- Jahmeel Russell − bass (2006−2007)
- Chad Tremblay − bass, backing vocals (2007−2010)
- Thérèse Lanz − bass (2010−2011)
- Andrew LaCour − bass, backing vocals (2011−2014)

== Discography ==
- Mongrel (2003)
- Reprisal (2006)
- Mennonite (2008)
- Venerable (2011)
- Entrench (2013)
- Success (2015)
- Nerve EP (2016)
- Loved (2018)
- Null (2022)
- Void (2023)

== Awards and nominations ==
Year	Award	Category	Work	Result	Ref
2024	Juno Award	Heavy Metal Album of the Year	Void	Nominated	
2019	Juno Award	Heavy Metal Album of the Year	Loved	Nominated	
2016	Juno Award	Heavy Metal Album of the Year	Success	Nominated	
2014	Juno Award	Heavy Metal Album of the Year	Entrench	Nominated	
2012	Juno Award	Heavy Metal Album of the Year	Venerable	Won	
