= Init Records =

- Founded: 2001
- Founder: Steven Williams
- Distributor(s): MVD, Cobraside Distribution
- Country of origin: United States
- Location: Minneapolis, Minnesota
- Official website: www.initrecords.net

Init Records (often stylized as INIT) is an American independent record label founded in January 2001 in Mankato, Minnesota by Steven Williams. In May 2003 the label relocated to Sioux Falls, South Dakota. In May 2013 the label relocated to Minneapolis/Saint Paul. Since its foundation the label has been solely owned and run by Williams, as a one-man operation, strongly influenced by DIY ethics of punk subculture and with an "emphasis to release aesthetically pleasing records from hardworking bands." An example of DIY ethics that the label applies in its releases is the use of recycled material, such as paper and plastic whenever and wherever possible.

== Artists ==
- The Abandoned Hearts Club
- Amenra
- Anodyne
- The Assailant
- Back When
- Battlefields
- The Black Soul Choir aka The Falling; McDaniel, Malina, and Pace
- The Blinding Light
- Building Better Bombs
- Buried Inside
- Caligari
- Calling Gina Clark
- Castle
- Chibalo
- The City Is The Tower
- Cougar Den
- Dispensing Of False Halos
- Enkephalin
- Examination Of The...
- Eyes Of Verotika
- Forstella Ford
- The Fortune Healers
- Hammerlord
- Hewhocorrupts
- The Howling Wind
- Hennes Siste Høst
- Hive Destruction
- In the face of war
- KEN mode
- Kidcrash
- Kite Flying Society
- Mahkato
- Melt-Banana
- Meth And Goats
- P.O.S
- Phoenix Bodies
- Raein
- Red Knife Lottery
- Ricky Fitts
- The Setup
- Since By Man
- Sinking Steps...Rising Eyes
- Sleeping In Gethsemane
- Souvenir's Young America
- The Spirit Of Versailles
- Sugartown Cabaret
- Swing By Seven
- Ten Grand
- Thou
- Tora! Tora! Torrance!
- Tornavalanche
- Towers
- Tyranny Of Shaw
- The Vidablue (Renamed as "Ten Grand" - see above)
- William Elliott Whitmore
- Woman Is the Earth
- Wolvhammer

== Discography ==
- INIT-80 For Want Of - Smoke CD (2013)
- INIT-79 Year of No Light - Vampyr CD (2013)
- INIT-78 Roman Ships - Death & The Lover CD (2013)
- INIT-77 The Atlas Moth/Wolvhammer - split 7-inch (2013)
- INIT-76 Amenra - Live CD (2012)
- INIT-75 The Blue Letter - Love Is Not Control CD (2012)
- INIT-74 Sinking Steps...Rising Eyes - Two Songs 7-inch (2011)
- INIT-73 Battlefields - Agassiz CD (2011)
- INIT-72 Kidcrash - Naps 12-inch (2011)
- INIT-71 The Fortune Healers - Hey, Providence CD (2011)
- INIT-70 Amenra/Hive Destruction - split 10-inch (2011)
- INIT-69 William Elliott Whitmore/P.O.S - split 7-inch (2011)
- INIT-68 KEN mode - Venerable LP (2011)
- INIT-67 Hive Destruction - Secretvm/Veritas CD (2011)
- INIT-66 Sugartown Cabaret - Beyond Foams CD (2010)
- INIT-65 Thou/The City Is The Tower - Dwell In The Darkness Of Thought And Drink The Poison Of Life (split) LP (2010)
- INIT-63 Wolvhammer - Black Marketeers Of World War III CD (2010)
- INIT-62 Hammerlord - Wolves At War's End CD (2010)
- INIT-60 Souvenir's Young America - The Name Of The Snake CD/LP (2010)
- INIT-59 Buried Inside - Chronoclast LP (2010)
- INIT-58 Kidcrash - Snacks CD/LP (2009)
- INIT-57 Melt-Banana - initial t. 3"CD/7" (2009)
- INIT-56 In the face of war - Everything You've Heard Is True CD (2009)
- INIT-55 Sleeping In Gethsemane - Burrows CD (2009)
- INIT-54 The Blinding Light - Junebug CD (2009)
- INIT-53 Towers - Full Circle CD/LP (2009)
- INIT-52 Chibalo - Chibalo LP (2010)
- INIT-51 Amenra - Mass III-II + Mass IIII 2×CD (2009)
- INIT-50 Hammerlord - Hammerlord CD (2008)
- INIT-49 Cougar Den - Keepondrifter CD/LP (2008)
- INIT-48 The Howling Wind - A Tyrannical Deposit In The Doctrine Of The Soul 7-inch picture disc (2009)
- INIT-47 Red Knife Lottery - Hip Bruisers 7-inch (2008)
- INIT-46 Battlefields - Entourage Of The Archaic CD/LP (2007)
- INIT-45 Kidcrash - Jokes CD (2007)
- INIT-44 Phoenix Bodies - Too Much Information CD+DVD (2007)
- INIT-43 Hennes Siste Høst - Høst CD (2007)
- INIT-42 Building Better Bombs - Freak Out Squares CD/LP (2007)
- INIT-41 Hewhocorrupts - The Discographer 2×LP (2007)
- INIT-40 Battlefields - Stained With The Blood of An Empire CD (2006)
- INIT-39 Back When - In The Presence CD (2006)
- INIT-38 Tornavalanche - No Money, No Problems LP (2006)
- INIT-36 Castle - Electric Wolves CD (2006)
- INIT-35 The Assailant - Nurse EP 7-inch picture disc (2006)
- INIT-34 Since By Man - Pictures From The Hotel Apocalypse LP (2005)
- INIT-33 Ricky Fitts - Wizard Lisp CD (2005)
- INIT-32 The Spirit Of Versailles - Live On WNYU 7-inch (2005)
- INIT-31 In the face of war - Summer Demo 2004 7-inch (2005)
- INIT-30 Phoenix Bodies/Raein - Split 7-inch (2005)
- INIT-29 Kite Flying Society - A Discography CD (2006)
- INIT-28 Examination Of The... - The Lady In The Radiator LP (2005)
- INIT-26 Back When/The Setup - Split 7-inch (2005)
- INIT-24 Back When - Swords Against The Father 7-inch (2004)
- INIT-23 In the face of war - Live Forever Or Die Trying CD (2004)
- INIT-22 Ricky Fitts/Eyes Of Verotika - Split 7-inch (2005)
- INIT-21 Sinking Steps...Rising Eyes - The 2002 EP 7-inch (2004)
- INIT-20 Dispensing Of False Halos - Growing Up, Giving In CD (2004)
- INIT-19 Phoenix Bodies/Tyranny Of Shaw - Split 7-inch (2004)
- INIT-18 Sinking Steps...Rising Eyes - Majestic Blue CD (2004)
- INIT-17 The Abandoned Hearts Club - The Initial Confessions Of... CD/7" (2004)
- INIT-16 Dispensing Of False Halos/Calling Gina Clark - Split 7-inch (2003)
- INIT-15 Anodyne - Salo CD (2003)
- INIT-14 The Spirit Of Versailles - Discography 2×CD (2003)
- INIT-13 Enkephalin/Phoenix Bodies - Split CD/LP (2003)
- INIT-12 Tora! Tora! Torrance!/Swing By Seven - Split 7-inch (2003)
- INIT-11 Dispensing Of False Halos - Dispensing Of False Halos 7-inch (2003)
- INIT-10 The Black Soul Choir - Cardinal CD (2003)
- INIT-09 Dispensing Of False Halos - With Prayers And A Scalpel CD (2003)
- INIT-08 Ten Grand/Meth And Goats - Split 7-inch (2004)
- INIT-07 The Blinding Light - Glass Bullet 7-inch (2002)
- INIT-06 Caligari - Caligari CD (2002)
- INIT-05 Forstella Ford - Insincerity Down To An Artform LP (2002)
- INIT-04 Mahkato - Fighting The Urge To Start Fires CD/7" (2002)
- INIT-03 The Spirit Of Versailles/Caligari - Split 7-inch (2001)
- INIT-02 The Vidablue - What I Should Have Said Volume One CD (2001)

== See also ==
- List of record labels
