= Sawblade EP =

Sawblade EP may refer to

- Sawblade (Isis EP)
- Sawblade (Gangrene EP)
