= Terraformer (Knut album) =

Studio album by Knut
- Released: 2005
- Genre: Mathcore, sludge metal
- Length: 44:00
- Label: Hydra Head Records (HH666-107)

Knut chronology
Challenger (2002)	Terraformer (2005)	Wonder (2010)

Terraformer is the third album by Swiss band Knut, released in 2005 on Hydra Head Records.

== Track listing ==
1. "7.08"– 1:32
2. "WYRIWYS" – 4:48
3. "Kyoto" – 4:19
4. "Torvalds" – 3:03
5. "Seattle" – 1:50
6. "Bollingen" – 1:51
7. "Solar Flare" – 7:30
8. "Fallujah" – 2:10
9. "Genoa" – 1:43
10. "Davos" – 2:28
11. "Evian" – 7:12
12. "Fibonacci Unfolds" – 6:27

== Personnel ==
- Didier Severin – vocals/electronics
- Jeremy Tavernier – bass/guitar
- Roderic Mounir – drums/guitar
- Philippe Hess - guitar
