= Entrench (album) =

Studio album by KEN mode
- Released: March 19, 2013
- Genre: Noise rock, sludge metal, post-hardcore
- Length: 46:47
- Label: Season of Mist
- Producer: Matt Bayles

KEN mode chronology
Venerable (2011)	Entrench (2013)	Success (2015)

Professional ratings
Review scores
Source	Rating
Allmusic	4/5 stars
Decibel Magazine	8/10 stars
Exclaim! Magazine	9/10 stars
Metal Injection	9/10 stars
Pitchfork	(8.2/10)
Pop Matters	8/10 stars
Sputnikmusic	4/5 stars

Entrench is the fifth studio album by the Canadian rock band KEN mode. The album was released on March 19, 2013 through Season of Mist. Producer of this album is Matt Bayles.

The album was named a longlisted nominee for the 2013 Polaris Music Prize on June 13, 2013.

== Track listing ==
No.	Title	Length
1.	"Counter Culture Complex"	3:19
2.	"No; I'm in Control"	3:30
3.	"Your Heartwarming Story Makes Me Sick"	2:43
4.	"The Terror Pulse"	4:51
5.	"The Promises of God"	3:31
6.	"Romeo Must Never Know"	7:16
7.	"Secret Vasectomy"	2:29
8.	"Figure Your Life Out"	5:24
9.	"Daeodon"	4:56
10.	"Why Don't You Just Quit?"	2:58
11.	"Monomyth"	5:50

== Personnel ==
Band

- Jesse Matthewson - guitars, vocals, bass, piano, microkorg
- Shane Matthewson - drums
- Andrew LaCour - bass, vocals

Additional musicians

- Tim Singer (Deadguy, Kiss It Goodbye) – guest vocals on "No, I'm in Control"
- Dave Verellen (Botch, Narrows) – guest vocals on "The Promises of God"

Artwork and design

- Ben "Lil Duncan" Bonner – sculpture
- Ryan Klatt – photography
- Randy Ortiz – layout
