= Challenger (Knut album) =

Studio album by Knut
- Released: March 19, 2002
- Genres: Mathcore, sludge metal
- Length: 51:34
- Labels: Hydra Head Records (HH666-62)

Knut chronology
Bastardiser (1997)	Challenger (2002)	Terraformer (2005)

Challenger is the second album by Swiss band Knut.

== Reception ==
Professional ratings
Review scores
Source	Rating
Sputnikmusic	4.5/5 stars
Lambgoat	9/10 stars

== Track listing ==
1. "Whacked Out" – 5:25
2. "Repressed" – 2:15
3. "El Niño" – 5:19
4. "Bite the Bullet" – 2:21
5. "Neon Guide" – 4:55
6. "H/Armless" – 3:51
7. "58.788" – 4:35
8. "Ice Will" – 3:02
9. "March" – 19:51

== Personnel ==
- Didier Séverin – vocals
- Phillipe Hess – guitar
- Jeremy Tavernier – bass
- Roderic Mounir – drums
