= Venerable (album) =

Studio album by KEN mode
- Released: 15 March 2011
- Recorded: August 19–28, 2010
- Studio: Godcity Studios (Salem, Massachusetts)
- Genre: Noise rock, sludge metal, post-hardcore
- Length: 42:44
- Label: Profound Lore, Init Records
- Producer: Kurt Ballou

KEN mode chronology
Mennonite (2008)	Venerable (2011)	Entrench (2013)

Venerable is the fourth studio album by Canadian noise rock band KEN mode, released on 15 March 2011 through Profound Lore on compact disc and Init Records on vinyl. Venerable won in the Metal/Hard Music Album of the Year category at the 2012 Juno Awards.

== Critical reception ==
=== Accolades ===
Publication	Country	Accolade	Year	Rank
Exclaim!	Canada	Top 10 Metal Albums of the Year	2011	1
Hellbound.ca!	Canada	Top 20 Albums of the Year	2011	7

Professional ratings
Review scores
Source	Rating
Allmusic	4/5 stars
PopMatters	7/10
Rock Sound	8/10
BW&BK	8.5/10
Exclaim!	Favorable
Revolver	3/5 stars

== Track listing ==
All lyrics written by Jesse Matthewson, all music written by KEN mode except "Flight of the Echo Hawk" co-written by KEN mode and Jahmeel Russell.

1. "Book of Muscle" – 3:28
2. "Obeying the Iron Will..." – 4:26
3. "Batholith" – 3:33
4. "The Irate Jumbuck" – 7:26
5. "A Wicked Pike" – 2:51
6. "Flight of the Echo Hawk" – 3:39
7. "Never Was" – 8:16
8. "The Ugliest Happy You've Ever Seen" – 3:03
9. "Terrify the Animals" – 2:58
10. "Mako Shark" – 2:58

== Personnel ==
Venerable album personnel adapted from CD liner notes.

KEN mode

- Jesse Matthewson – guitar, vocals
- Shane Matthewson – drums
- Chad Tremblay – bass, vocals

Additional musicians

- Kurt Ballou – slide guitar on "Terrify the Animals"
- Jahmeel Russell – composing on "Flight of the Echo Hawk"

Production

- Kurt Ballou – engineer, mixing
- Alan Douches – mastering

Artwork and design

- Julie Anne Mann – artwork
- Josh Graham – design, layout
- Aaron Turner – KEN mode logo
