= Woman Is the Earth =

American black metal band

- Origin: Black Hills, South Dakota, USA
- Genres: Black metal
- Years active: 2007–present
- Labels: Eisenwald; Init
- Members: Jon Martin; Andy Martin; Jarrod Hattervig

Woman Is the Earth is an American black metal band from Black Hills, South Dakota.

== History ==
Woman Is the Earth was formed in Black Hills in South Dakota in 2007 by vocalist/guitarist Jarrod Hattervig, second guitarist Andy Martin and drummer Jon Martin. Two years after formation the band released their debut album Of Dirt which they produced and published at own costs. Three years after the release of their debut album, the band recorded and published their second album This Place Contains My SpiritISOLATION: INTERVIEW MIT JOHANNES SCHMID, ALBERT RÖHL</ref>

In 2014 and 2016 Woman Is the Earth released their third and fourth full-length studio album Depths and Torch of Our Final Night which were both published via Init Records. In 2021 the band published their fifth album Dust of Forever via Init Records.

== Musical style ==
The band's music is described as atmospheric black metal with influences from other musical genres like post-rock without being a clone of bands like Wolves in the Throne Room. The musicians themselves declare being part of the "Cascadian black metal" scene. The musicians roots' are in the punk and grindcore. Next to Wolves in the Throne Room the band gets musical inspiration from bands like Skagos and Alda. The length of the bands songs ranges between six and ten minutes.

== Discography ==
- 2009: Of Dirt (Album, Self-published)
- 2012: This Place That Contains My Spirit (Album, Self-published, re-released in 2014 via Eisenwald Tonschmiede, Vinyl: Wolfrune Worxxx)
- 2014: Depths (Album, Init Records)
- 2016: Torch of Our Final Night (Album, Init Records)
- 2017: Thaw (EP, Init Records)
- 2021: Dust of Forever (Album, Init Records)
