= Live VI =

Live album by Isis
- Released: February 14, 2012
- Recorded: November 16, 2007
- Genres: Post-metal, Sludge metal
- Length: 74:40
- Label: Self-released
- Producer: Isis

Isis chronology
Melvins / Isis (2010)	Live VI (2012)	Temporal (2012)

Live VI is the sixth live release by post-metal band Isis, recorded at the Hawthorne Theatre in Portland, Oregon on November 16, 2007. It was released as a digital download on February 14, 2012, and on limited-edition vinyl through the band's online store. It is notable for being the first album announced and released by the band since their 2010 dissolution (Melvins / Isis was announced before their breakup and released afterwards).

The recording boasts the best sound quality among Isis' live releases, having been recorded and mixed by drummer Aaron Harris and mastered by James Plotkin. Live VI is also notable for being the most diverse live recording by Isis, featuring material from six different albums (including early EP's Mosquito Control and The Red Sea).

The band had hinted at a release for months through their Facebook page, with Live VI being the fulfillment of that promise.

== Track listing ==
All tracks are written by Isis.

No.	Title	Length
1.	"Hive Destruction"	5:41
2.	"So Did We"	8:32
3.	"Not In Rivers, But In Drops"	8:03
4.	"Gentle Time"	6:51
5.	"In Fiction"	11:12
6.	"Holy Tears"	7:07
7.	"Weight (feat. Ayal, Maria)"	13:42
8.	"Red Sea"	7:39
9.	"Carry"	5:53

== Personnel ==
- Aaron Turner – vocals, guitar
- Jeff Caxide – bass guitar
- Michael Gallagher – guitar
- Aaron Harris – drums
- Bryant Clifford Meyer – keyboards and guitar
- Maria Christopher – guitar on "Weight", vocals on "Weight" and "Carry"
- Ayal Naor – vocals on "Weight"
- Mixed by Aaron Harris at Vista studios, Los Angeles, CA, 2011
- Mastering by James Plotkin, 2011
