= Bastardiser =

Studio album by Knut
- Released: April 17, 1998
- Recorded: 1997
- Genre: Mathcore
- Length: 35:21
- Labels: Hydra Head Records (HH666-51)

Knut chronology
Leftovers (1997)	Bastardiser (1998)	Challenger (2002)

Professional ratings
Review scores
Source	Rating
Rock Sound	4/5 stars

Bastardiser is the first full-length album by Swiss mathcore band Knut, released in Europe in 1998.

== Track listing ==
1. "Crawling on All Fours" – 3:19
2. "Engine" – 4:14
3. "The Whip" – 3:01
4. "High-Low" – 3:00
5. "Merge" – 4:16
6. "Wiped Out" – 2:24
7. "Descent" – 4:18
8. "Crouch" – 10:49
