= Void (KEN Mode album) =

Studio album by KEN Mode
- Released: September 22, 2023
- Length: 39:46
- Label: Artoffact

KEN Mode chronology
Null (2022)	Void (2023)

Void is the ninth studio album by Canadian noise rock band KEN Mode. It was released on September 22, 2023, by Artoffact Records.

== Background ==
On June 2, 2023, KEN Mode announced the release of their ninth studio album, along with the single "The Shrike". Speaking of the album, lead vocalist Jesse Mathewson said:

"This album is the companion piece to 2022's NULL album. Both were written and produced at the same time, throughout the pandemic, and recorded by Andrew Schneider in the fall of 2021. The two-album arc was written with the intention of being two separate works that could be coupled together to make one full album."

== Critical reception ==
Professional ratings
Aggregate scores
Source	Rating
Metacritic	80/100
Review scores
Source	Rating
Beats Per Minute	70%
Distorted Sound	8/10
Exclaim!	8/10
Kerrang!	4/5 stars

Void was met with "generally favorable" reviews from critics. At Metacritic, which assigns a weighted average rating out of 100 to reviews from mainstream publications, this release received an average score of 80, based on 4 reviews.

At Exclaim!, writer Marko Djurjic wrote: "Void solidifies KEN Mode as one of Canada's most important heavy acts, a band that doesn't just rely on brute force to affect its audience."

== Track listing ==
Void track listing
No.	Title	Length
1.	"The Shrike"	4:10
2.	"Painless"	2:31
3.	"These Wires"	7:54
4.	"We’re Small Enough"	4:16
5.	"I Cannot"	3:50
6.	"A Reluctance of Being"	6:56
7.	"He Was a Good Man, He Was a Taxpayer"	5:05
8.	"Not Today, Old Friend"	5:03
