= Live VII =

Live album by Isis
- Released: March 31, 2017
- Recorded: February 25, 2010
- Venues: Corner Hotel, Melbourne, Australia
- Genres: Post-metal, sludge metal
- Length: 78:28
- Label: Ipecac Recordings
- Producer: Isis

Isis chronology
Temporal (2012)	Live VII (2017)

Live VII is the seventh live album by post-metal band Isis, recorded at the Corner Hotel in Melbourne, Australia, on February 25, 2010. It was released as a digital download on March 31, 2017, and on limited-edition CD and vinyl through Ipecac. Live VII features material from Wavering Radiant, as well as select highlights from each of the band's other studio albums.

== Track listing ==
All tracks are written by Isis.

No.	Title	Length
1.	"Hall of the Dead"	7:50
2.	"Hand of the Host"	10:02
3.	"Holy Tears"	7:32
4.	"20 Minutes / 40 Years"	7:23
5.	"Ghost Key"	8:30
6.	"Wills Dissolve"	6:22
7.	"Threshold of Transformation"	10:14
8.	"Carry"	5:15
9.	"Celestial (The Tower)"	15:20

== Personnel ==
- Aaron Turner – vocals, guitar
- Jeff Caxide – bass guitar
- Michael Gallagher – guitar
- Aaron Harris – drums
- Bryant Clifford Meyer – keyboards and guitar
- Mixed by Aaron Harris at Vista studios, Los Angeles, CA, 2016
- Mastering by James Plotkin, 2016

== Reception ==
Live VII received positive reviews upon release. James Weiskittel of Soundblab gave the album a rating of 8/10, and stated "...for the overall sound of this release, there is just enough ambiance to let you know this is a live record, but otherwise, the quality of these recordings far exceeds your typical ‘from the mixing board’ affair … Live VII represents Isis at their peak; a potent reminder to fans that when the band decided to walk away, they did so at the top of their game."

Morgan Y Evans, writing for Metal Riot, gave the album 5 stars and said "the Wavering Radiant stuff sounds positively alive on this release, the band’s excitement from this era palpable. The watery grandeur of the hypnotic opening to 'Ghost Key' is breathtaking and the rhythmic guitar parts really cut through on this version as the song progresses. The brief post-huge crescendo quiet ending of 'Threshold Of Transformation' is another stunning section … all in all this gets very high marks because it is not only so cool to hear more organic versions of 'Hall of the Dead' and a fit to exploding 'Holy Tears', but the simple breadth of what the band accomplishes and the ground covered here is far beyond the reach of most groups."

In a review from the Outlaws of the Sun blog, Gavin Brown wrote "[Isis] were certainly equally at home on stage as they were in the studio and this live concert (sic), recorded in Melbourne in 2010, proves this beyond a shadow of a doubt … the sound is crystal clear and shows a band, despite being close to their splitting up, sounding absolutely immense with their sprawling sonic tales and as impressive as they are on record." Brown also stated that "The nine songs that they play here are epically recreated and demonstrates just how powerful [of] a live band they were..."

Victoria Anderson of Ghost Cult Magazine gave Live VII a rating of 8.5/10, and said "Much like all ISIS live outings when they were active, each song flows effortlessly into the next creating a tapestry of mind altering realities … You come away from the album exhausted and pure. Live VII is an experience that you will not soon forget."
