= Sincebyman =

American rock band

- Origin: Milwaukee, Wisconsin, U.S.
- Genres: Hardcore punk, mathcore, post-hardcore, sasscore
- Years active: 1999–2008
- Label: Revelation Records
- Members: Sam Macon; Brad Clifford; Kevin Herwig; Eric Alonso; Jon Kraft

Sincebyman was a five-piece American band from Milwaukee, Wisconsin, founded in 1999. Their debut full-length album, We Sing the Body Electric, was released on February 4, 2003. This was followed by A Love Hate Relationship (Revelation Records, 2004), a 4-song EP, and Pictures from the Hotel Apocalypse (Revelation Records, 2005), their final full length on Revelation Records. Following Pictures from the Hotel Apocalypse, their contract with Revelation ended and the band was supposedly writing songs for a new album. On March 9, 2008, they disbanded according to a MySpace bulletin from the band. Their last show was in their hometown of Milwaukee on April 26, 2008.

During their career, the band shared the stage with the likes of The Dillinger Escape Plan, The Rapture, International Noise Conspiracy, The Locust, Underøath, Glass Candy, Isis, The Fall of Troy, Bear vs. Shark, The Bled, Protest the Hero, As Cities Burn, Fear Before the March of Flames, Poison the Well, and Andrew W.K.

Sincebyman's name comes from the title of the 46th Movement of Händel's Messiah: "Since by Man came Death".

== Band members ==
Current

- Sam Macon – vocals
- Brad Clifford – guitar
- Kevin Herwig – guitar
- Eric Alonso – bass
- Jon Kraft – drums

Former

- Justin Kay – guitar
- Bryan Jerabek – bass
- Reed Schuster – bass
- Kenny – bass
- Andy Menchal – bass (one show only @ Milwaukee Metalfest)

== Discography ==
=== Albums ===
- We Sing the Body Electric (Revelation Records, 2003)
- Pictures from the Hotel Apocalypse (Revelation Records, 2005)

=== EPs ===
- A Love Hate Relationship (Revelation Records, 2004)

=== Split albums ===
- With Arms Still Empty/Since By Man – A Split (Kill You for a Dollar, 2000)
- Seven Days of Samsara/Since By Man – Why Don't You Set This on Fire (Harmless Records, 2000)

=== 7 inch ===
- Start Kit to Promote the Destruction of Adulthood (World Wont Listen, 2001)
