= Buried Inside =

Canadian rock band

- Origin: Ottawa, Ontario, Canada
- Genres: Metalcore, post-hardcore, post-metal, progressive metal, hardcore punk
- Years active: 1997–2010
- Labels: Relapse
- Past members: Mike Godbout; Steve Martin; Emmanuel Sayer; Nick Shaw; Andrew Tweedy; Matias Palacios-Hardy
- Website: buriedinside.com

Buried Inside was a Canadian band from Ottawa, Ontario.

== History ==
Buried Inside was formed in 1997, influenced by early metalcore and hardcore punk bands Acme, One Eyed God Prophecy, Drift, and Union of Uranus. Tweedy and Martin had previously played together in the mathcore band Kenobi.

Their sound included distorted vocals, creatively timed drumming, heavy use of octave double stops (which created a melodic effect), and occasional sampling of gloomy film dialogue or instruments such as the cello. After releasing two independent albums, in 2005 they signed to Relapse Records and put out their "concept" album, Chronoclast. That year the band toured North America with Eye-HateGod and Byzantine. In 2006, guitarist Tweedy released a solo extended play, Glass Fingers, on Translation Loss Records.

In 2009 they released their fourth album, Spoils of Failure. They played their final show on November 13, 2010.

== Members ==
=== Final line-up ===
- Andrew Tweedy – guitar, vocals
- Nick Shaw – vocals
- Mike Godbout – drums
- Steve Martin – bass, vocals

=== Past members ===
- Matias Palacios-Hardy – guitar (1997–2005, 2009–2010)
- Emmanuel Sayer – guitar (2005–2009)

== Discography ==
- In and of the Self (1999, Matlock Records)
- Suspect Symmetry (2001, Cyclop Media)
- Chronoclast (2005, Relapse Records, Init records)
- Spoils of Failure (2009, Relapse Records)
