= Dephosphorus =

Greek extreme metal band

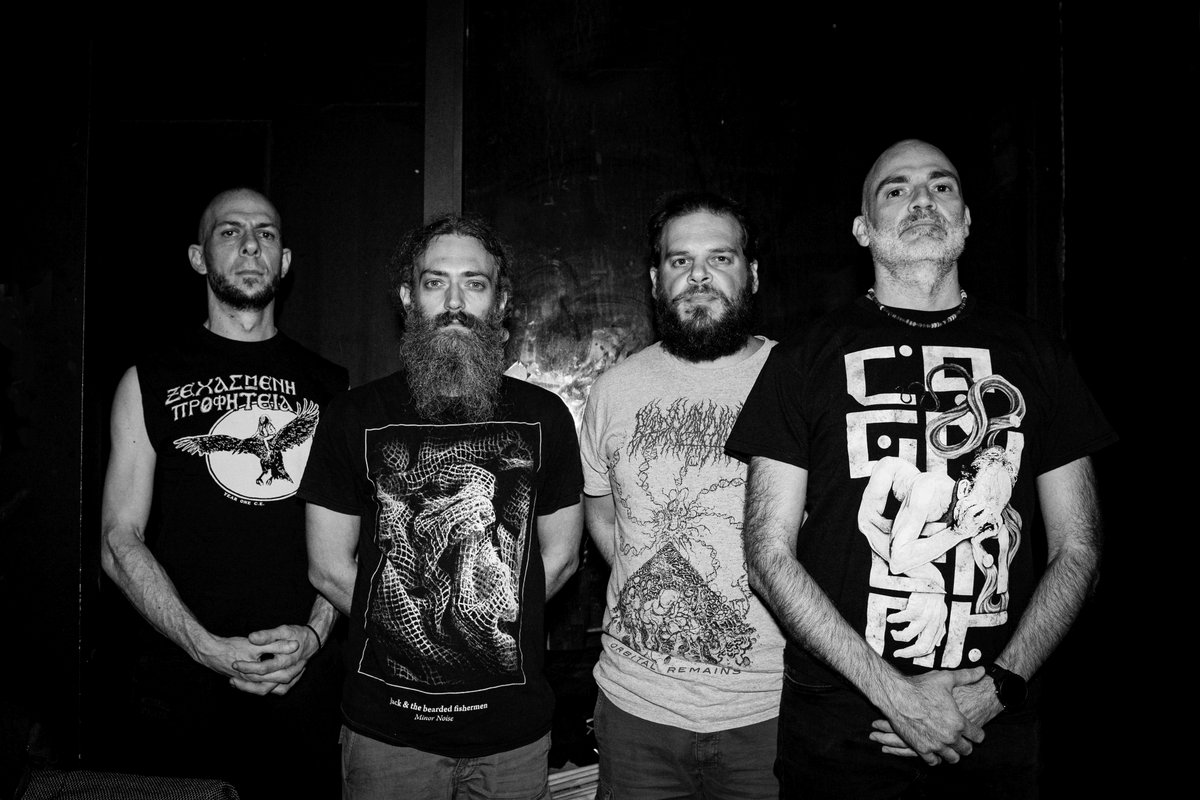
- Dephosphorus. From left to right: John Votsis, Costas Ragiadakos, Thanos Mantas, Panos Agoros

Background information
- Origin: Athens, Greece
- Genres: Death metal, black metal, grindcore
- Years active: 2008–present
- Labels: 7 Degrees; Selfmadegod
- Members: Thanos Mantas; Panos Agoros; John Votsis; Costas Ragiadakos
- Website: dephosphorus.com

Dephosphorus is a Greek extreme metal band from Athens, formed in 2008. The band describes its musical style as "Astrogrind", a fusion of grindcore, death metal, black metal, sludge metal, noise rock, post-hardcore, and electronic music.

Lyrically, the band draw on themes from astronomy, cosmology and science fiction, exploring concepts such as humanity’s place in the universe and cycles of destruction and renewal.

Since their formation, Dephosphorus have released five studio albums, which received positive critical reception.

== History ==
Dephosphorus was founded in 2008 in Athens by guitarist Thanos Mantas and vocalist Panos Agoros. The band’s name is derived from a science fiction-inspired concept of a cosmic entity exploring the universe in search of meaning, reflecting their early thematic focus on astronomy and speculative fiction. Early recordings were produced in collaboration with other members of the Athens underground metal scene. The band released their debut EP, Axiom in 2011, through 7 Degrees Records. The album was noted in the underground metal press for its unique blend of grindcore intensity with atmospheric and space-themed concepts.

Dephosphorus' first full-length album, Night Sky Transform, was released in 2012. The band's sound was developed from pure grindcore to a mix of grindcore, death and black metal. The album was also praised for its vocals, as it included tracks with clean vocals, chants, and semi-singing, making it better all around than Axiom.

Throughout the 2010s, the group became noted for their splits with acts such as Wake (2012), Great Falls (2012), and Haapoja (2015). They also participated in Monomaniac's compilation LP in 2013, and in Discharge's Hear Nothing See Nothing Say Nothing multi-band cover album in 2014. Their second album, Ravenous Solemnity, was released in 2014, and it was praised for their musical approach where "punk meets metal, black meets death, grind meets doom", as well for its smart musical composition. Mantas stated that his sounds for this album were influenced by Sweden, as it awakes grim and stark feelings inside one, and vocally he was influenced by rebetiko. Agoros stated that the 2008 financial crisis impact on Greece and Greece's organised religion shaped the album's lyrical theme.

Dephosphorus' third full-length album, Impossible Orbits, was released in 2017. Despite the album and the tracks' short duration - 9 tracks that add up to just 30 minutes - the album is solid and heavy, and appears darker and more ominous than their previous works. It has been noted that Agoros' vocals in Impossible Orbits, which are more angst and pain driven than guttural, act as something different and "fresh" to the norm.

In 2020, Dephosphorus released their fourth full-length album, Sublimation, which was inspired by Iain Banks' concept of sublimation, describing the transcendence of advanced civilisations into higher forms of existence beyond the material universe. The album continues with their usual musical composition, though being musically darker, and lyrical themes, and, while musically it is not as intense as their previous one, it is praised as reaching the next step to their sound.

Dephosphorus' fifth album, Planetoktonos, was released in 2025. The album’s themes draw on concepts of cosmic destruction and renewal, as well as humanity’s place within the biosphere, and were partly inspired by the science fiction series The Expanse. It received positive reviews from an extent coverage by music critics, overall described as an intense, refined, and expansive take on grindcore. Mystification Zine praised the album's “transformative interpretation” of grindcore, noting its increased focus and intensity compared to Sublimation. PopMatters highlighted its fusion of “cosmic assault” with atmospheric electronics, while TEN KILLERS described it as “furious” and consistent across its nine tracks. Deadly Storm Zine emphasized its science fiction–inspired themes, calling it a “death black grindcore journey through a dark and mysterious universe”. The Razor's Edge and Wonderbox Metal commended the band's dynamic songwriting and inventive blend of aggression with psychedelic elements. Additional coverage from MangoWave Magazine and Metal Shock Finland positioned the release as Dephosphorus’ most ambitious work to date, balancing brutality with conceptual depth. The album’s artwork depicts a biomechanical spacecraft of extraterrestrial origin capable of planetary destruction, developed in collaboration with artist Giannis Tsioukas. The cover of Planetoktonos was selected in a top-5 album covers for 2025 by Scene Point Blank.

Despite being primarily active within the Greek underground metal scene, the band has also developed an international audience through online platforms and releases.

== Musical style and influences ==
=== Sound ===
Dephosphorus’ music is commonly described as astrogrind, a fusion of grindcore, death metal, black metal, sludge metal, noise rock, and post-hardcore, reflecting the band’s eclectic musical background. Their sound combines fast-paced rhythms, aggressive guitar riffs, and a mixture of guttural, semi-clean, and chant-like vocals, creating a dynamic and layered listening experience.

The band has also incorporated electronic elements into their recordings, treating them as a structural component of their sound and atmosphere. The band uses the term "astrogrind" to describe their style, emphasizing the fusion of extreme metal with cosmic and philosophical themes.

Critics have highlighted the band's complex song structures, noting that their compositions often merge the intensity of extreme metal with atmospheric and experimental passages. Reviewers have also remarked on the band's ability to balance brutality with conceptual depth, incorporating both raw aggression and moments of melodic or psychedelic ambiance.

=== Lyrics ===
Lyrically, Dephosphorus draws inspiration from astronomy, cosmology, and science fiction, which incorporate speculative ideas about space exploration and the future of humanity.. They are particularly influenced by the works of Isaac Asimov and Jules Verne. The band’s songwriting process typically begins with guitarist Thanos Mantas developing riffs and demo structures, which are later expanded collaboratively during rehearsals to include rhythm, bass, vocals, and electronic elements. Their songs explore sociopolitical and existential themes, including opposition to organized religion and commentary on human society. Their work also reflects an interest in humanity’s place in the universe and broader critiques of contemporary civilization through a cosmic perspective.

=== Influences ===
The band's musical influences are broad, ranging from classic extreme metal acts to underground experimental artists. Their compositions often emphasize contrasting textures, blending the harshness of black and death metal with more atmospheric and ethereal elements. They mentioned they are influenced by bands such as Integrity, Catharsis, Gehenna, Ringworm, Darkside, Nasum, Voivod, Leviathan and the Belgian H8000 scene. While Dephosphorus is an extreme metal band, Mantas has stated that he was also musical influenced by rebetiko, which has subtly added to the band's sound.

== Discography ==
=== Studio albums ===
- Night Sky Transformation (2012)
- Ravenous Solemnity (2014)
- Impossible Orbits (2017)
- Sublimation (2020)
- Planetoktonos (2025)

=== Live albums ===
- Astralaudioviolence (Live at Temple) (2018)

=== Compilation appearances ===
- Monomaniac vol.2 & 3 (2013)
- Hear Nothing See Nothing Say Nothing: The CVLT Nation Sessions (2014)

=== EPs ===
- Axiom (2011)

=== Split albums ===
- Dephosphorus / Wake (2012)
- Dephosphorus / Great Falls (2012)
- Haapoja / Dephosphorus (2015)

== Members ==
- Thanos Mantas (ex-Sbloccare, ex-Straighthate, ΝΑΦΘΑLYN, Voidhead) - guitar (2008 - )
- Panos Agoros (ex-Straighthate, Kommpound, ex-Amnis Nihili) - vocals (2008 - )
- John Votsis - drums (2013 - )
- Costas Ragiadakos (Decipher, ex-Abyssus, ex-Fated Circle) - bass (2016 - )
