= Anodyne (band) =

- Origin: United States
- Genres: Sludge metal, Mathcore
- Years active: 1997–2005
- Labels: Level Plane Records; Init Records; Escape Artist Records
- Members: Mike Hill; Joshua Scott; Joel Stallings
- Past members: Thos Niles; Mike Davis; Ayal Naor; Ira Bronson; Dave Witte

Anodyne was an American hardcore band active from 1997 to 2005. Their music was characterized by chaotic song structures coupled with layers of feedback and noise similar to bands like Kiss It Goodbye, Today is the Day and Black Flag. The lyrics were broodingly introspective and emotional. The band went through several lineup changes before arriving at the definitive line up of Mike Hill, Joshua Scott, and Joel Stallings. Drummer Joel Stallings is notable for introducing blast beats to the band’s sound, which were often employed later in the band's existence. Anodyne was affiliated with a number of independent record labels including Escape Artist, Level Plane, and Chainsaw Safety. They completed several US tours and one European Tour. Members went on to perform in Versoma, Tombs and Defeatist.

== Discography ==
=== Albums ===
- Quiet Wars CD (1999, Escape Artist Records)
- The Outer Dark CD/LP (2002, Escape Artist Records)
- Lifetime Of Gray Skies CD/LP (2004, Level Plane Records)
- The First Four Years CD (2004, Blackbox Recordings)

=== EPs ===
- Anodyne 7" (1998, Reproductive Records)
- Red Was Her Favorite Color 7" (2001, Happy Couples Never Last)
- Berkowitz 7" (2001, Alone Records)
- Anodyne/Keelhaul 7" (2002, Chainsaw Safety Records)
- Salo 10" (2003, Insolito Recordings)
- Salo CD (2003, Init Records)
- Anodyne/Defcon 4 7" (2003, Ammonia Records)
