= Melvins / Isis =

EP by Melvins and Isis
- Released: July 13, 2010
- Genres: Heavy metal, rock
- Length: 24:47
- Labels: Hydra Head Records (12") (HH666-214)

Isis chronology
Wavering Radiant (2009)	Melvins / Isis (2010)	Live VI (2012)

Melvins chronology
The Bride Screamed Murder (2010)	Melvins / Isis (2010)	Sugar Daddy Live (2011)

Reverse side
- The reverse side, titling the release Isis / Melvins

The Melvins and Isis released a split EP on Hydra Head Records in 2010, with each band contributing two tracks. Isis' "Way Through Woven Branches" had previously only been available as a bonus track on the Japanese edition of their last full-length, Wavering Radiant, whilst "Pliable Foe" was exclusive to this release. Both tracks were recorded during the Wavering Radiant sessions. Meanwhile, the Melvins tracks are reworked from their release The Bride Screamed Murder, described as displaying the "dadaist/trickster tendencies of the band which has frustrated and delighted fans in equal measure since (very nearly) the beginning of their existence". The album was released July 13, 2010 on CD format, with vinyl copies available a week earlier from Vacation Vinyl in Los Angeles.

Pitchfork's Jess Harvell was unimpressed by Isis′ contribution to the split, stating that “Isis seem to be building to something on these songs, but the climaxes are so restrained you can almost miss them if you're not paying close enough attention [...] I kept hoping Isis would finally let loose, offer a little chaos. After all, the best part of Mogwai's "Like Herod" isn't the clockwork precision; it's the freak out.” As for the Melvins side, she deemed it “more of the same, but here I don't mean that in a disparaging way at all”, and found that “the grooves, especially on "I'll Finish You Off", have the same punchy dynamics the Isis tunes lack.”

Isis frontman and owner of Hydra Head Records, Aaron Turner, documented the design process of the album art on his personal blog.

The split was released after Isis had announced their imminent dissolution. Melvins subsequently supported Isis for several dates on their farewell tour.

Professional ratings
Review scores
Source	Rating
Decibel	8/10
Pitchfork	6.0/10

== Track listing ==
Side A
No.	Title	Artist	Length
1.	"Pig House (Alt. Version)"	Melvins	5:53
2.	"I'll Finish You Off (Alt. Version)"	Melvins	4:44

Side B
No.	Title	Artist	Length
1.	"Way Through Woven Branches"	Isis	6:27
2.	"The Pliable Foe"	Isis	7:43
