= Isis (band) =

American post-metal band

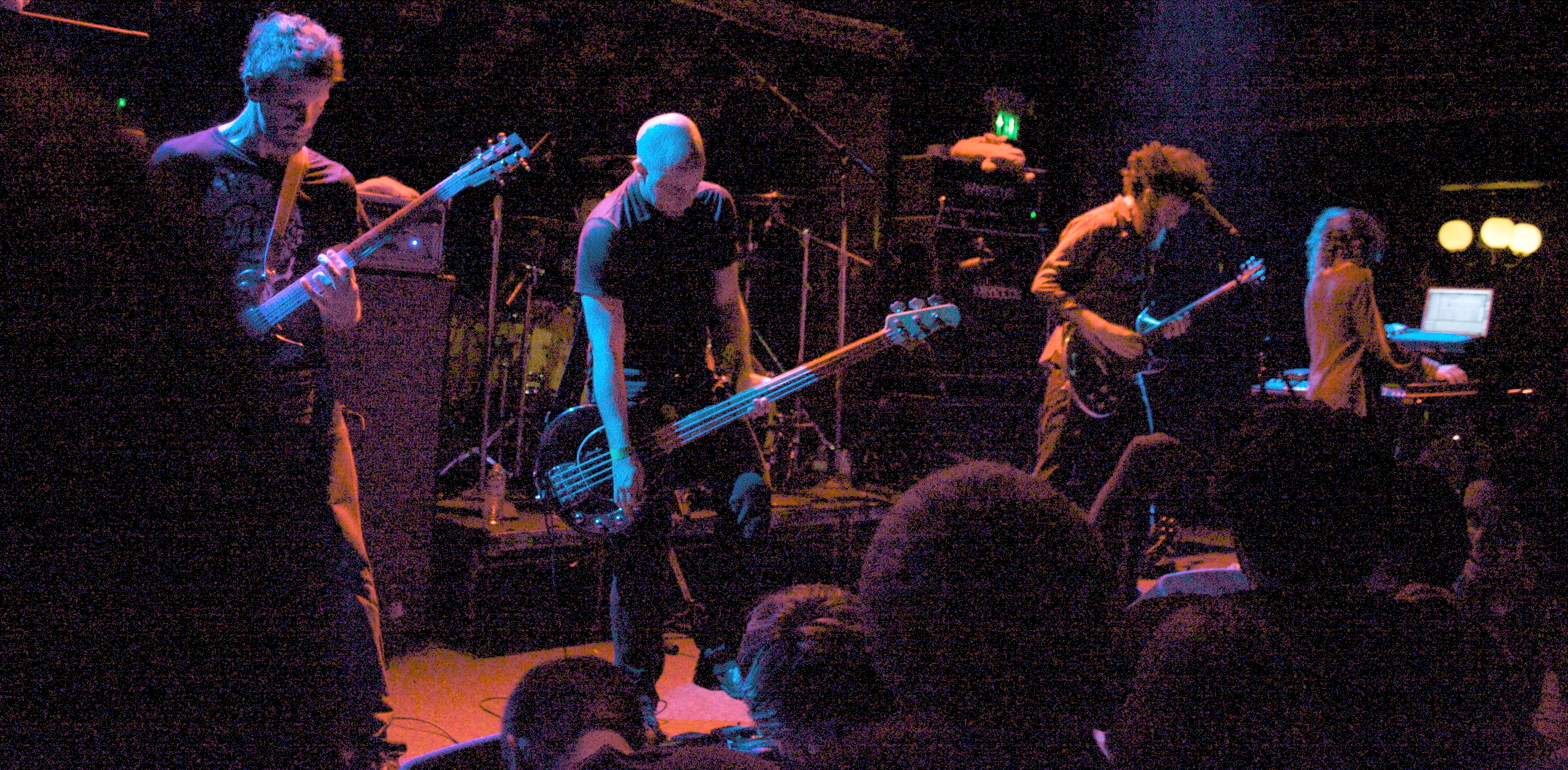
- Isis in 2009. From left to right: Michael Gallagher, Jeff Caxide, Aaron Turner, and Bryant Clifford Meyer (with Aaron Harris in the background).

Background information
- Also known as: Celestial (2018)
- Origin: Boston, Massachusetts, U.S.
- Genres: Post-metal; sludge metal; progressive metal
- Years active: 1997–2010; 2018
- Labels: Robotic Empire; Ipecac; Neurot; Tortuga; Second Nature; Escape Artist; Hydra Head
- Spinoffs: House of Low Culture; Palms
- Past members: Aaron Turner; Jeff Caxide; Aaron Harris; Michael Gallagher; Bryant Clifford Meyer; Chris Mereschuk; Randy Larsen; Jay Randall
- Website: isistheband.com

Isis (sometimes stylized in all uppercase) was an American post-metal band from Boston, Massachusetts, that was active from 1997 to 2010. After some early personnel changes, the band's lineup of guitarist Aaron Turner, bassist Jeff Caxide, drummer Aaron Harris, guitarist Michael Gallagher, and keyboardist Bryant Clifford Meyer remained consistent for all five studio albums.

With roots in hardcore punk and doom metal, Isis borrowed from and helped to evolve the post-metal sound pioneered by bands such as Neurosis and Godflesh, characterized by lengthy songs focusing on repetition and evolution of structure. Much of their material was released through Ipecac Recordings and Robotic Empire. Isis disbanded in June 2010, just before the release of a split EP with the Melvins. They reformed in 2018 as Celestial for a one-off show to pay tribute to the late Cave In bassist Caleb Scofield.

Music critics consider Isis influential pioneers in the post-metal genre. Oceanic was named one of the best albums of 2002 by Pitchfork and one of the best metal albums of all time by Rolling Stone.

== History ==
=== Formation and early releases (1997–2000) ===
Isis began in the autumn of 1997 in Boston, Massachusetts, following several sessions of experimentation by Aaron Turner (guitar/vocals), Jeff Caxide (bass guitar), Aaron Harris (drums), and Chris Mereschuk (electronics/vocals). As Turner stated, "Isis formed as a result of the dissatisfaction with past bands of the founding members. None of us were happy with what we were doing musically at the time, two of us lived together, [and] we had similar tastes and similar record collections." After a few months of rehearsal, on March 14, 1998, the band performed their first live show at Cabaret Underworld in Montreal, Canada. Shortly thereafter, they recorded a demo at Salad Days Studios that was engineered by Mike Hill. The demo was released on cassette tape by Turner's own record label, Hydra Head Records, in the spring of 1998. Randy Larsen (of Cable) joined Isis as a second guitarist, but his stint in the group was brief, and he left following their East Coast summer tour with Cable.

In August 1998, Isis recorded their debut extended play, Mosquito Control, at God City Studios with Kurt Ballou. Mereschuk left the band shortly after, and they recruited Michael Gallagher (formerly of Cast Iron Hike) and Jay Randall (of Agoraphobic Nosebleed) into the lineup. Mosquito Control was released in October 1998 by Escape Artist Records and supported by tours with Converge, Cavity, Ire, and Anodyne. In February 1999, Isis returned to God City to record another EP, The Red Sea, which was released by Second Nature Recordings. Jay Randall departed the band, and multi-instrumentalist Bryant Clifford Meyer (formerly of The Gersch) joined ahead of a spring/summer 1999 tour with Cave In. After writing material for their first full-length, they embarked on a late 1999 tour with Neurosis and Candiria. During these shows, Isis sold the Sawblade EP, a handmade CD-R attached to a full-sized metallic saw blade. Hydra Head made 200 numbered copies, which were sold at a limit of 15 per night, with leftovers given to friends of the band as a year-end "thank you" gift. Tortuga Recordings later pressed 250 vinyl copies, available via mail order and during Isis' summer 2000 tour with The Dillinger Escape Plan and Candiria.

=== Celestial and SGNL>05 (2000–2002) ===
In January 2000, Isis began recording their debut full-length, Celestial, at The Outpost in Stoughton, Massachusetts. The album was engineered and mixed by Matt Bayles, who would produce the bulk of their material going forward. The recording lineup of Turner, Caxide, Harris, Gallagher, and Meyer remained until Isis' dissolution in 2010. Celestial was released on April 3, 2000, through Escape Artist. Metal Hammer named it one of the 20 best metal albums of 2000, while Rock Sound placed it 3rd in their rundown of the top albums of 2001. It was later named the 53rd-finest metal record of the decade by Decibel. In July 2000, Relapse Records issued a split 7-inch EP by Isis and Pig Destroyer. Isis contributed a cover version of the Godflesh song "Streetcleaner" that had also appeared on their Sawblade EP. That summer, they toured the United States with The Dillinger Escape Plan and Candiria, performing at Hellfest and the inaugural edition of Furnace Fest.

Isis followed up Celestial with SGNL›05, an EP composed of material that was recorded during the same studio sessions. Aaron Turner described it as a "continuation" of Celestial, and "an expansion upon some of the ideas presented therein." The CD edition was released in March 2001 by Neurot Recordings, with vinyl copies available later that year through Tortuga. Around this time, Isis toured with Keelhaul, Eyehategod, and later Napalm Death. SGNL›05 initiated Isis' relationship with Godflesh member Justin Broadrick, who created a remix of the title track from Celestial. The updated song is included on the EP. Following SGNL›05, Isis felt a need to expand its ambit, both artistically and in terms of distributive reach. They were fans of the Melvins, so their label – Mike Patton's Ipecac Recordings – was put forward as an ideal candidate. Turner's friend James Plotkin was already working with the label, and he showed some material to Patton, who, unknown to the band, was already a fan. Isis signed with Ipecac, which went on to issue the band's subsequent studio albums.

=== Oceanic, remixes and Live series (2002–2004) ===
Whereas Celestial was deeply rooted in heavy metal and hardcore, the band's next full-length, Oceanic, saw them acquire characteristics comparable to post-rock and ambient music, aiding in the birth of the post-metal genre. Oceanic was recorded in the spring of 2002 at Fort Apache Studios and New Alliance in Massachusetts. While much of the album retained the band's "metallic" intensity, the departure in sound saw them appeal to a wider audience. As a result, Oceanic is considered a turning point in the history of the band. Aaron Turner himself describes it as their "quintessential album". Oceanic was released on September 16, 2002, by Ipecac, with vinyl copies available courtesy of Escape Artist. It was their most successful release at the time, receiving 'album of the year' accolades from Rock Sound and Terrorizer, and a fourth-place ranking in Decibel's "Top 100 Albums of the Decade" special issue. The distinctive tone of material since and including Oceanic had an impact on avant-garde metal, helping to develop the sound of several contemporaries. Cult of Luna, Pelican, Tides, Rosetta, and Russian Circles have all cited Isis as an influence. This underground success attracted the attention of the likes of Mogwai, who went on to tour with Isis.

In 2003, Isis relocated from Boston to Los Angeles, California, for business-related reasons. In December, a series of live albums was announced, the first of which features a set performed in San Francisco during a tour with Mogwai. Isis would self-release their live albums on CD, while vinyl versions saw limited releases through various record labels. The first two installments of the series, Live I and Live II, were both released in 2004. That same year, Robotic Empire released a series of four vinyl EPs titled Oceanic Remixes Volumes I–IV, which featured reinterpretations of songs from Oceanic by various artists. Contributors include Mike Patton, Justin Broadrick, Tim Hecker, and Venetian Snares. Aaron Turner has stated that he was surprised by the response of the collaborators; having expected half of those contacted by the band to respond, all but two provided material for the series. The content from these EPs, along with an additional track by Tim Hecker, was compiled into a double album, Oceanic Remixes/Reinterpretations, which was released by Hydra Head.

=== Panopticon and collaborations (2004–2006) ===
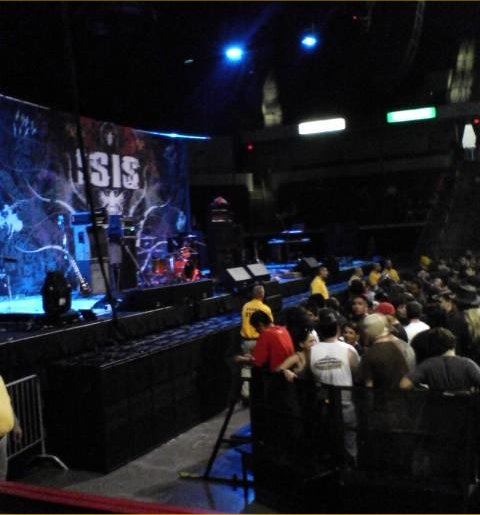
An Isis stage during the tour for Panopticon

Isis' third studio album, Panopticon, was recorded and mixed at Los Angeles' Paramount Studios in June and July 2004. It features a guest appearance from Justin Chancellor of Tool. According to bassist Jeff Caxide, the writing process was different from that of previous Isis albums, as “everyone wrote a lot on this record. There is not one song that could be credited to one person.” Panopticon was released in CD format on October 19, 2004, by Ipecac, with vinyl releases handled by Robotic Empire in the United States and Trust No One in Europe. It was well received, with Rock Sound naming it 'album of the year'. It also reached No. 47 on Billboard's Top Independent Albums chart, the band's first entry into any mainstream music charts. Reacting to the impact of Oceanic and Panopticon, Revolver named Isis the twelfth-heaviest band of all time in December 2004. A music video for the track "In Fiction" was directed by Josh Graham and shot during late 2004. Isis toured extensively, with dates in the United States, Australia, Europe, and a spate in Japan with Converge and Mastodon. They also performed a free concert at the Los Angeles Museum of Contemporary Art to support an exhibition of 1950s and 60s minimalist art.

In 2005, Isis released Live III and made an appearance on the Melvins tribute album We Reach: The Music of the Melvins. Issued by Fractured Transmitter, the album features tracks from the likes of High on Fire, Pig Destroyer, Eyehategod, and Mastodon. Isis contributed a cover version of the song "Boris", which was made in collaboration with Agoraphobic Nosebleed. After releasing a fourth live album, on July 23, 2006, Isis performed Oceanic at KOKO in London as part of the All Tomorrow's Parties-curated Don't Look Back series. In September 2006, Ipecac released Clearing the Eye, a DVD documenting Isis' live performances throughout the world over a five year period. That same month, a collaboration with Aereogramme titled In the Fishtank 14 was released as part of a project of Dutch record label Konkurrent. The EP was recorded largely over three days in July 2005 at E-Sound Studio in Weesp, Netherlands. Rock Sound ranked it as the 39th best album of 2006 in its yearly rundown.

=== In the Absence of Truth (2006–2008) ===
The band's fourth full-length album, In the Absence of Truth, was recorded and mixed at Bomb Shelter Studios in Los Angeles. The process began in June, and its completion was announced through a blog post on July 8, 2006. The album was released on October 31, 2006, with CD copies available through Ipecac. The vinyl releases were handled by Robotic Empire and Conspiracy Records. In the Absence of Truth saw the emergence of a more melodic sound, and leanings away from previous "drone" inclinations towards more traditional metal elements. During the writing and recording stages, some band members were based in New York City and others in Los Angeles. Aaron Turner later confessed that the album "suffered" due to this situation. Jeff Caxide and Aaron Harris also expressed dissatisfaction with the finished product. Despite this, In the Absence of Truth earned positive reviews, receiving a 70% score on Metacritic. Rock Sound named it the 3rd best album of the year, while Decibel placed it 13th in its top albums of 2006. It was also their most commercially successful release to date, peaking at No. 6 on the Billboard Heatseekers charts.

Isis was the opening act for Tool on the late 2006 North American tour in support of their new album, 10,000 Days. This led to increased exposure for the band, with Turner stating, "We never imagined that Isis would become as successful or as popular as it has." He expressed some discomfort with fame, and confessed, "[Fans] taking a deeply personal interest in who I am, it fucking freaks me out. And I really do feel like sometimes when I get approached, I'm retreating into my shell." In celebration of Isis' tenth anniversary, the songs "Holy Tears" and "Not in Rivers, But in Drops" were both released as singles. Each single contains a studio recording, a live rendition, a remix, and a music video. Additionally, Robotic Empire and Conspiracy Records jointly released a twelve LP box set called Shades of the Swarm. Limited to 600 copies on heavyweight 180-gram vinyl, the set comprises the band's discography, with the exception of live albums and collaborations.

=== Wavering Radiant and disbandment (2008–2010) ===
For their fifth album, Wavering Radiant, Isis chose to work with producer Joe Barresi. The band's previous full-lengths had been produced by Matt Bayles, but it was decided that a change was needed. Although the professional parting of ways was peaceable, working with Bayles had become, in the words of Aaron Harris, "routine" and "old hat". Barresi was selected due to his work with bands such as Tool, Queens of the Stone Age, and Melvins. Recording and mixing took place at JHOC beginning in November 2008, with additional tracking at Sound City Studios. The involvement of Tool's Adam Jones as a guest musician was revealed along with the album's official announcement. Wavering Radiant was released by Ipecac on limited vinyl on April 21, 2009, and in CD format on May 5. European distribution was undertaken by Conspiracy, while a special Japanese edition was handled by Daymare Recordings. Critical appraisal was largely positive; it went on to place well on a handful of best-of lists at the close of the year, and Isis was named "Best Underground Metal Act" at Revolver's Golden Gods awards ceremony. Commercially, Wavering Radiant was their most successful release ever, breaching the Billboard 200 and gaining international chart presence.

Following the album's release, a music video for "20 Minutes/40 Years" was directed by Matthew Santoro. Live V was also released, featuring a 2006 performance of Oceanic that was recorded at KOKO in London. Isis embarked on a 2009 tour of North America, supported by Pelican and Tombs, and a tour of Europe, supported variously by Keelhaul, Dälek, and Circle. They then traveled to Australia, New Zealand, and Japan with Baroness before returning to the United States for shows with Melvins, Jakob, and Cave In. Isis also made appearances at Bonnaroo festival in Manchester, Tennessee, and Soundwave Festival in Australia. On May 18, 2010, Isis announced the decision to break up following their tour. Their final show took place on June 23, 2010, in Montreal, the location of the band's very first show twelve years earlier. Isis collectively stated they have "done everything we wanted to do, said everything we wanted to say," and as part of an agreement made by the band at its formation, they did not wish to "push past the point of a dignified death."

=== Post-breakup ===
In the wake of Isis' dissolution, a split EP with the Melvins was released by Hydra Head. It features two songs from the Wavering Radiant sessions: the Japanese bonus track "Way Through Woven Branches", and the unreleased song "The Pliable Foe". Hydra Head also announced that the entire series of Live albums would see digital releases from May to July 2011. That same year, Jeff Caxide, Aaron Harris, and Bryant Clifford Meyer joined forces with Chino Moreno of Deftones to form a new band called Palms. The resulting self-titled debut album was released on June 25, 2013.

On February 14, 2012, Isis released Live VI, a multitrack recording from their tenth anniversary tour. On November 6, 2012, Ipecac issued a compilation double album titled Temporal, containing unreleased demo recordings and rare tracks from throughout the band's history. Isis also shared a new music video for "Pliable Foe", which was directed by Kenneth Thomas. In 2013, it was announced that a remastered version of Celestial would be released by Ipecac with new artwork from Aaron Turner. This was followed in 2014 with remastered editions of Panopticon and Oceanic. In August 2014, Isis changed their name on Facebook to "Isis the band" to avoid any confusion with the Islamic State.

On March 31, 2017, Live VII was released, featuring a set recorded during the 2010 Soundwave Festival in Australia. Hydra Head reissued Mosquito Control for its 20th anniversary with new artwork from Aaron Turner. A remastered edition of The Red Sea was also released with updated artwork from Turner. In 2018, Isis reunited under the name "Celestial" for a one-off benefit show to honor former Cave In bassist Caleb Scofield, who died in a road accident several months earlier. The concert took place on October 13, 2018, at the Wiltern Theatre in Los Angeles. Cave In, Pelican, 27, and Old Man Gloom also performed at the event, which was streamed live.

== Musical style and influences ==
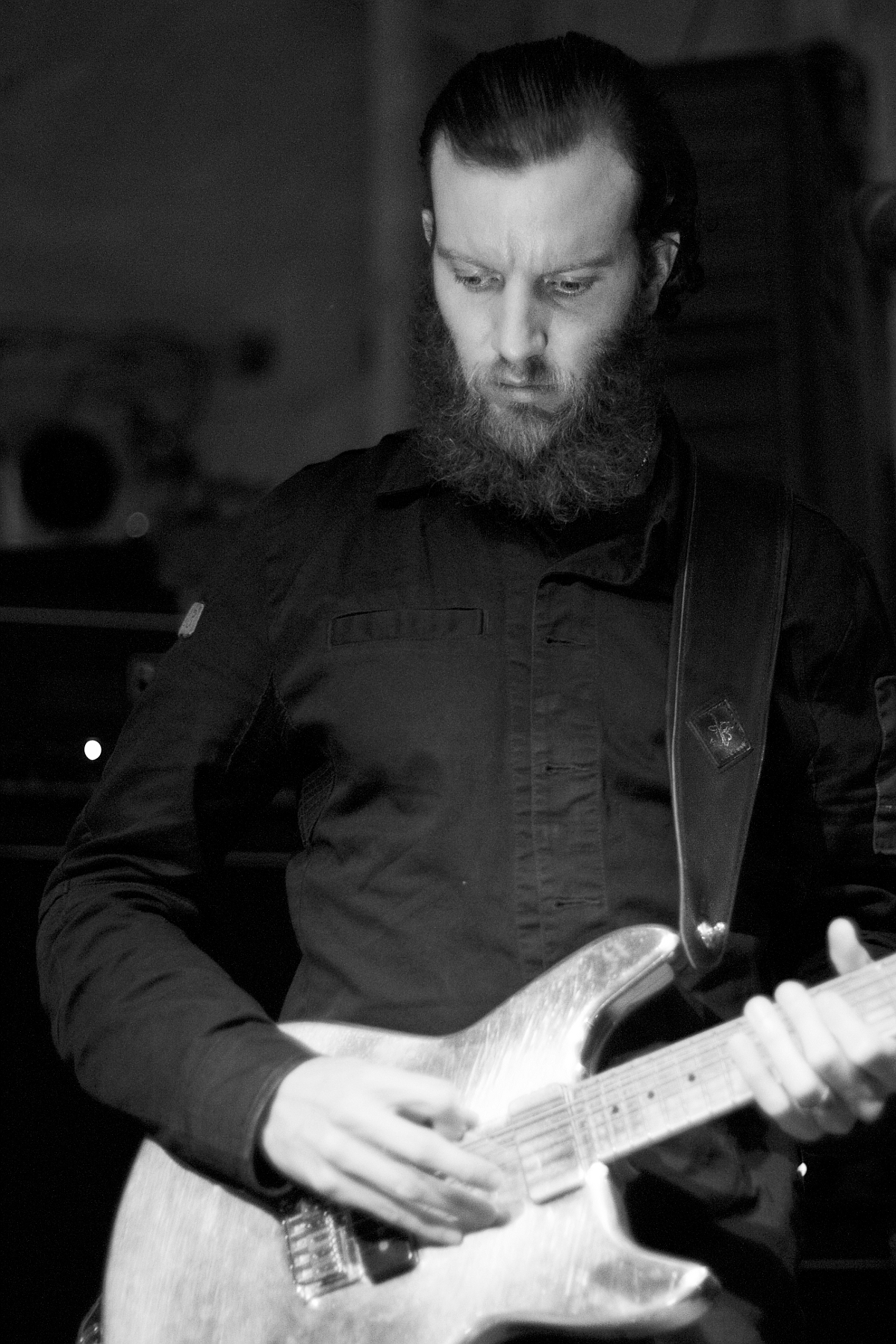
Isis frontman Aaron Turner

According to Taylor Markarian of Loudwire, "ISIS tend to focus more on letting the instrumentals tread winding pathways than attacking with straightforward riffs and vocals." Turner cites Swans, Melvins, Tool, Godflesh, and Neurosis as influences to Isis' sound, saying "those bands laid the groundwork for us [...] we're part of a recognizable lineage." Early releases were derided as imitative of Neurosis, and he admits that the comparisons weren't "completely unjustified". However, material since (and including) Oceanic has not been so often likened to Neurosis; in fact, it has become the case that it is Isis who are being imitated in a burgeoning post-metal scene.

In terms of categorization, Isis have been described as post-rock, a genre which leans away from the traditional elements of choruses, verses, repetitive vocals, or fast riffing – the latter of which Turner describes as "guitar theatrics". Post-rock arguably tends to have an essentially halcyon sound, one which rarely uses vocals and typically is devoid of distorted guitars. Isis, however, have origins in hardcore punk and metal, and use aggressive vocal styles similar to hardcore. Their music includes elements of hardcore, drone, ambient music, and post-rock, among others. Revolver critic Dan Epstein noted, "though [Isis were] originally lumped in with the hardcore and doom metal scenes, the band has long since transcended the musical boundaries of those genres." However, their ongoing acceptance within the pantheon of hardcore music is attested to by Converge's Jacob Bannon, who has gone on record saying, "if I wanna [sic] listen to emotional music which I guess is contemporary [...] I'll listen to Isis or something like that – something that is emotional, powerful music."

Turner, when asked to define Isis, described their sound as "avant-garde, drone-oriented rock, but that doesn't completely cover the bases". At the same time, he is reticent about settling on one label exclusively, and steers away from the use of specific genre labels – "heavy, atmospheric, droning, post-epic, post-metal, shoegazer blah blah blah." When asked how he reacts to being asked to define Isis' sound, he admits "I never know what to say. I'm almost afraid of perpetuating a new tag." Likewise, he also describes their music using a slightly more open-ended tag: as "thinking man's metal". This tag refers to the intellectual elements behind the music, as opposed to exclusively aural ones.

Due to the difficulty in pigeonholing, some fans and critics label Isis as post-metal. This genre is accepted to contain similar-sounding contemporaries such as Pelican, Cult of Luna, and Callisto. Isis are often credited with the formulation of the genre with the release of Oceanic. In addition to the aforementioned, they have also been described as sludge metal, progressive metal, and even metalcore. Isis did not write their music for mainstream appeal, according to guitarist Michael Gallagher: "... we've never tried to be on the radio, and we've never tried to please others. We've simply done whatever we've wanted to do, and we've all decided to be happy with the results."

== Equipment ==
Circa 2005, Aaron Turner and Michael Gallagher were both using Gibson Les Paul guitars with Mesa/Boogie V-Twin preamps and a Mackie power amp. By 2009, Isis used "Evans drum heads, Vater drumsticks, Paiste cymbals, Electrical Guitar guitars, VHT amplifiers, Aguilar amplifiers, D'Addario strings, [and] GHS strings."

== Conceptual elements ==
Aaron Turner has gone on record saying, "I like the idea of preserving at least a little shred of mystery and making the band to be more an entity – without hopefully sounding too pretentious – as a work of art [than a traditional rock band]". Turner has also said in an interview in New Zealand music magazine Rip It Up that "we don't want to hand-feed everything to the listener. We just want to have a sense of mystery". There is a definite attitude that art and music are interchangeable and synonymous to the band; he feels that "the songwriting and the artwork come from the same place." This logic relates to visual and aural aspects as well as overt intellectualization, through literary references and driving philosophies. Books such as Don Quixote, House of Leaves, Labyrinths, and the philosophies of Jeremy Bentham have all played a role in shaping the themes of Isis' releases.

There is an overt intention of progressing heavy music present in Isis' output; a desire to further the intellectual cause that pushes them forward. This is evident within the clear progression of their sound from release to release, their influence on heavy music, and their acceptance in art circles where other metal bands are not so readily embraced. Their stated goal is "not to break away from the scene that [they] came from, but to expand upon it." Publications such as Terrorizer attest to how Turner has completed his goal, explaining that "Aaron Turner has loosened hardcore from its geographical roots, and in the process created an intimate, yet immeasurable vision all of his own". Turner has complained that "metal in general has long been unjustly maligned as solely the province of knuckle-dragging meatheads [...] That said, there's never been a group of musicians like there is now, who are helping to advance the form."

=== Lyrical themes ===
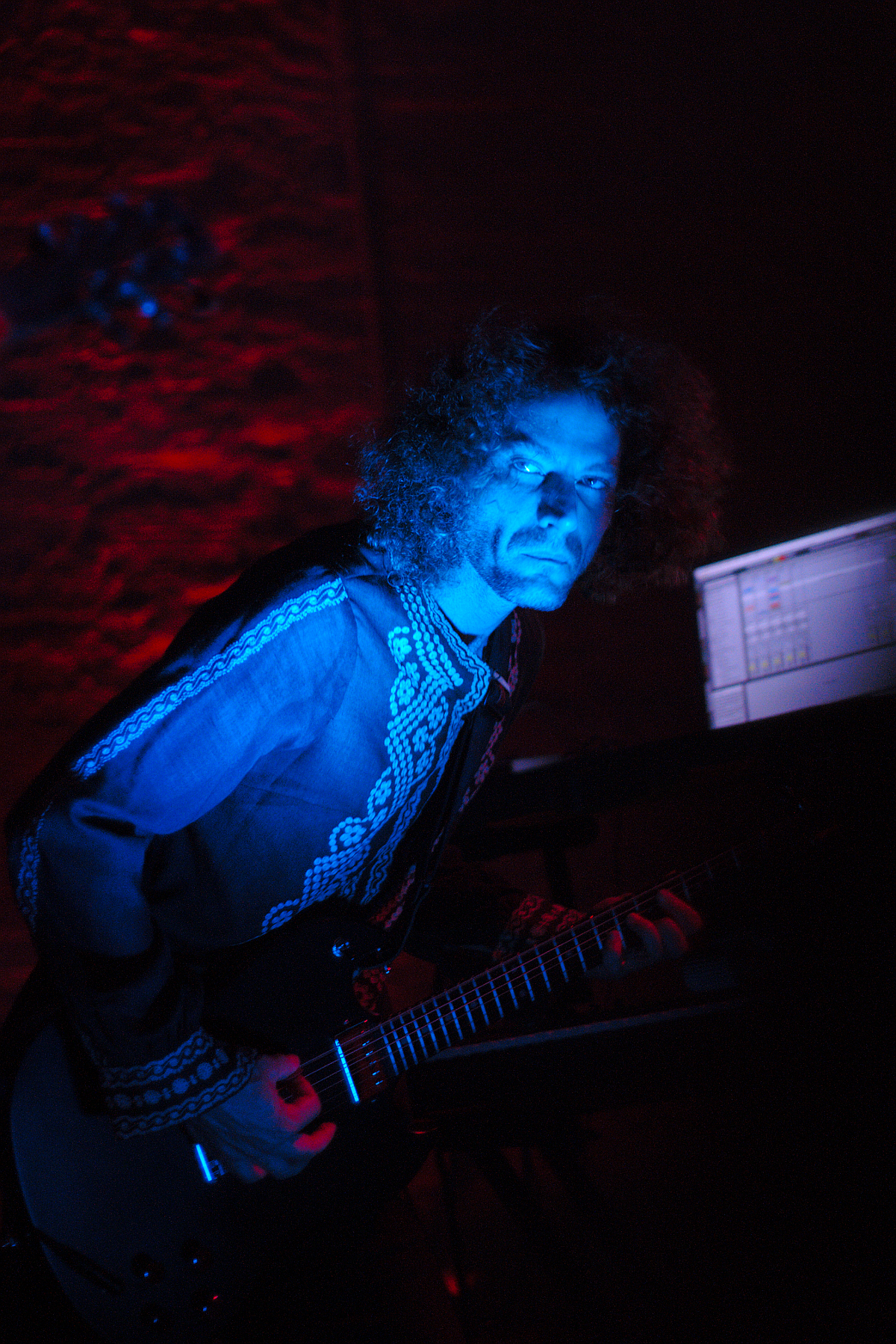
Bryant Clifford Meyer

Most of Isis' releases revolve around a theme. While each release has its own unique theme, many of the major releases interconnect. Turner has stated, "we wanted to have albums that weren't just grab-bags of songs but rather a cohesive experience from beginning to end, from the music to the lyrics to the layout of the record."

No Isis album contains an explicit diegesis, or story arc, instead focusing on themes rather than stories. As such, releases are defined by some as "pseudo-concept albums". The band see lyrics as important, but at the same time, Turner does not feel it necessary to enunciate every word. Instead, any connections made are mainly conjecture, and the formation of a theme takes into account the album artwork, previous albums, track titles, and the use of metaphor as much as lyricism. Oceanic tells a convoluted tale involving love, incest, and suicide by drowning. This relates to the theme of an all-powerful female, present lyrically in every album except Panopticon. Turner does not explicitly acknowledge an "overtly feminine theme"; however, he does state, "I just think it's interesting to include that as part of what we do, simply because metal, especially, is considered to be this very male-oriented, testosterone-driven art form, and I feel like it's important to recognize the other side of our nature. As manly as we might or might not be, we have to acknowledge that there is a feminine part of our persona, and that the world isn't made up of absolutes. To achieve balance, you have to recognize every facet of yourself and everyone else around you." Turner notes that certain threads do reappear between albums. "There are certain themes which reoccur in my work just because of what I'm interested in and what is aesthetically pleasing for me," he says. "The idea of futuristic utopias and dystopias is probably something that does consciously and subconsciously return time and time again [...] and sometimes I just can't help the fact that these themes creep into my work whether it's conscious or not." The other two ongoing motifs in the lyrics and artwork are that of towers and mosquitos.

Panopticon was an overtly political release, and arguably the clearest statement made within their music yet. It displayed fears of surveillance and of tacit governmental influence; its namesake, the panopticon, was Jeremy Bentham's concept for a prison system in which all the prisoners can be viewed by one guard in a central tower, without knowing whether they are being observed or not. Bentham described the Panopticon as "a new mode of obtaining power of mind over mind, in a quantity hitherto without example." Quizzed on government conspiracies, Turner states, "I do believe that each and every day our government and the huge corporate entities of this country lie to us about numerous subjects. In this respect we are all victims of a huge conspiracy – most of those in power are only concerned with the advancement of their agendas and have no qualms about deceiving and hurting the American people."

After frequently explaining concepts and story outlines to interviewers and fans, Turner chose to keep the thematic basis of In the Absence of Truth quiet. "Through explaining the last two albums time and time again, I just started to become weary of the topic, and I started to feel like I was losing my connection to the music and the lyrics simply from having repeated it so many times [...] I feel there's a lot of emphasis these days placed on explaining everything in such a fashion that there's really nothing left for the listener or reader to explore themselves. It's all spelled out. So it's interesting to leave some of that stuff open-ended so they have to do a little bit of legwork themselves." He was similarly reticent about revealing much that went into Wavering Radiant, beyond noting that Carl Jung's theories and dreams served as inspiration.

== Band members ==
Final lineup

- Aaron Turner – vocals, guitars (1997–2010)
- Jeff Caxide – bass (1997–2010)
- Aaron Harris – drums (1997–2010)
- Michael Gallagher – guitars (1998–2010)
- Bryant Clifford Meyer – electronics, guitars, vocals (1999–2010)

Early members

- Chris Mereschuk – electronics, vocals (1997–1998)
- Randy Larsen – guitars, vocals (1998)
- Jay Randall – electronics, vocals (1998–1999)

Timeline

== Discography ==
Studio albums

- Celestial (2000)
- Oceanic (2002)
- Panopticon (2004)
- In the Absence of Truth (2006)
- Wavering Radiant (2009)
