= Keelhaul (band) =

American metal band

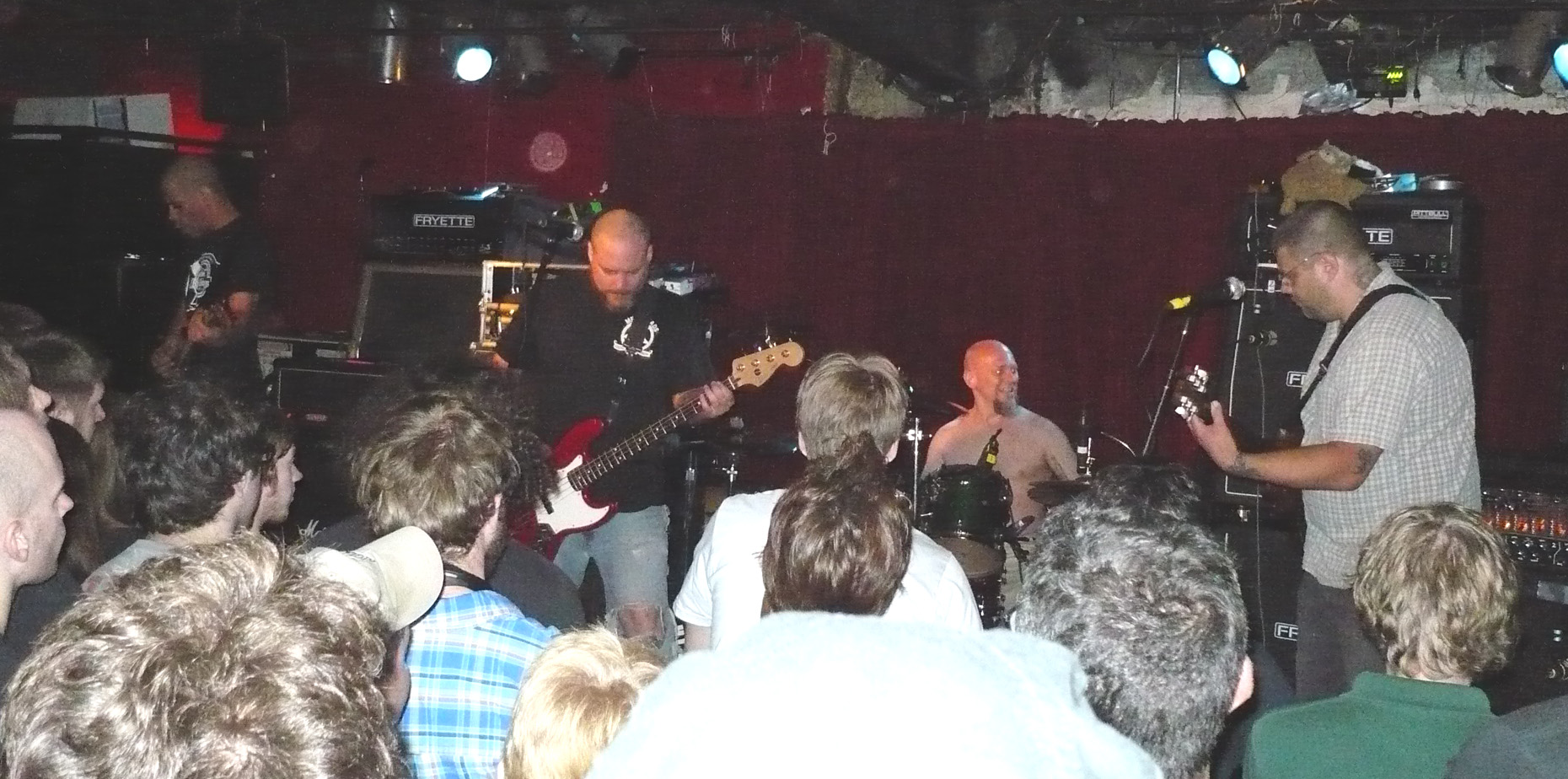
- Keelhaul performing in 2009

Background information
- Origin: Cleveland, Ohio, U.S.
- Genres: Sludge metal, mathcore
- Years active: 1998–present
- Labels: Hydra Head
- Members: Chris Smith; Aaron Dallison; Dana Embrose; Will Scharf
- Website: keelhaul.info

Keelhaul is a four-piece progressive mathcore/sludge metal band from Cleveland, Ohio. The members are Aaron Dallison (bass, vocals), Dana Embrose (guitar), Will Scharf (drums), and Chris Smith (guitar, vocals).

The band formed in 1998. They toured Europe in April 2004 and subsequently went on a lengthy break. With no tours or new music recorded, Keelhaul entered the studio in December 2008 with producer Andrew Schneider to record their new album, Keelhaul's Triumphant Return to Obscurity. In the same month, the band resumed live activity with two shows, one in Philadelphia and the other in New York. In 2009, they played support to Isis for the Wavering Radiant tour (which took in dates across Europe), filling the bill with Finnish band Circle.

== Members ==
- Chris Smith (Integrity, Terminal Lovers, False Hope) – guitar, vocals
- Aaron Dallison (Escalation Anger, Ringworm, Abdullah, State of conviction, Axioma) – bass, vocals
- Dana Embrose (Groin, La Gritona, Suicide King, False Hope) – guitar
- Will Scharf (Craw) – drums

Guest musicians

- Bryant Clifford Meyer of Isis and Red Sparowes appears on the song "Randall" from the Subject to Change Without Notice album.

== Discography ==
- Keelhaul – (CD 1998, Cambodia Recordings)
- Keelhaul – (CD 1999, Escape Artist Records)
- Keelhaul – (LP 1999, Hydra Head Records), available as a picture disc
- Ornamental Iron – (LP 7" 2000, Hydra Head Records)
- Keelhaul II – (CD 2001, Hydra Head Records)
- Keelhaul II – (LP 2001, Escape Artist Records), available as a picture disc
- Anodyne – Keelhaul – (Split 7" LP 2002, Chainsaw Safety Records)
- Subject to Change Without Notice – (CD 2003, Hydra Head Records)
- Subject to Change Without Notice – (LP 2003, Escape Artist Records), available as a picture disc
- You Waited Five Years for This? – (EP 7" 2009, Hydra Head Records)
- Keelhaul's Triumphant Return to Obscurity – (2xLP 2009, Hydra Head Records)
- Keelhaul's Triumphant Return to Obscurity – (CD 2009, Hydra Head Records)
